= 2012 United States House of Representatives elections in Texas =

- November 6, 2012

All 36 Texas seats to the United States House of Representatives
- Turnout: 7,993,851 - 58%
| | Majority party | Minority party |
|---|---|---|
| Party | Republican | Democratic |
| Seats before | 23 | 9 |
| Seats won | 24 | 12 |
| Seat change | ▲1 | ▲3 |
| Popular vote | 4,429,270 | 2,949,900 |
| Percentage | 57.79% | 38.49% |
| Swing | ▼6.6% | ▲7.9% |
Republican
40–50%
50–60%
60–70%
70–80%
80–90%
90>%
Democratic
40–50%
50–60%
60–70%
70–80%
80–90%
90>%
Democratic
Hold
Gain
Republican
Hold
Gain
Republican
40–50%
50–60%
60–70%
70–80%
80–90%
90>%
Democratic
40–50%
50–60%
60–70%
70–80%
80–90%
90>%

The 2012 United States House of Representatives elections in Texas were held on Tuesday, November 6, 2012, to elect the 36 U.S. representatives from the state of Texas—an increase of four seats in reapportionment following the 2010 United States census. The elections coincided with the elections of other federal and state offices, including a quadrennial presidential election and an election for the U.S. Senate. The primary election had been scheduled to be held on March 6, 2012, with a runoff election on May 22; because of problems arising from redistricting, the primary was postponed to May 29, and the run-off to July 31.

With 58% of voting age people turning out, all existing seats were held by their respective parties with one exception, the Democrats picking up the 23rd District. Of the four new seats, two were won by the Republican Party for a total of 24 seats, and two were won by the Democratic Party for a total of 12 seats.

== Redistricting ==
In March 2011, The Texas Tribune conducted a poll of Texas "insiders" which found 54 percent to believe three of the state's four new congressional districts would be drawn to favor the Republican Party, with one district drawn to favor the Democratic Party; while 37 percent of those polled felt two districts would favor Republicans while two would favor Democrats. In April, Republican U.S. Representative Lamar Smith argued that the seats should be evenly split between the parties in order to reflect Texas's growing Hispanic population and abide by the Voting Rights Act. Joe Barton, also a Republican U.S. Representative, disagreed, arguing that three or four of the districts should favor Republicans.

Also in April, the Mexican American Legislative Caucus filed a lawsuit against Governor Rick Perry and the state of Texas, seeking to halt redistricting based on census data which allegedly failed to count up to 250,000 Hispanic residents of colonias. Later in April, Democratic U.S. Representative Lloyd Doggett released a map which he alleged had been submitted by Republican members of Congress to leaders of the Texas Legislature. The map would divide Travis County between four districts, three of which would favor Republicans and one of which would favor Democrats.

In May, state representative Burt Solomons, a Republican, expressed concern that the legislature would not produce a congressional redistricting map by May 30, when it was scheduled to adjourn, and that a special session would be necessary. State senator Kel Seliger, the chair of the Senate's Select Committee on Redistricting, also downplayed the likelihood that redistricting legislation would be passed but emphasized the importance of creating a "credible instrument for the court to consider." Joe Barton later filed a lawsuit in response to perceived "inaction" by the legislature on redistricting. On May 25, Seliger confirmed that the legislature would not pass redistricting legislation, and that a congressional map would be drawn either by a federal court or in a special session. The same day, Rick Perry reiterated his position that the Legislature rather than the courts should draw the map, and three days later said he would call a special session on the condition that legislators decide on a map in advance.

On May 30, Perry called a special session. On May 31, the first day of the special session, redistricting was added to the list of matters to be addressed and Seliger and Solomons released a proposed congressional map. In Seliger and Solomons' map, African Americans and Hispanic Americans form majorities in two of the new districts, while the other two new districts gave Perry more than 56 per cent of their vote in the 2010 gubernatorial election. The districts represented by Doggett and Republicans Quico Canseco and Blake Farenthold would be made more favorable to Republicans. Democratic state representative Marc Veasey and Nina Perales of the Mexican American Legal Defense and Educational Fund criticized the plan, which they said failed to increase the number of minority opportunity districts. Democratic U.S. Representative Gene Green filed a lawsuit against the map, alleging that it would neglect Hispanic population growth primarily in Harris County. On June 2, Solomons acknowledged that the map was likely to undergo significant changes.

A new map was proposed by Seliger on June 2, under which Republican U.S. Representative Ron Paul's district would be significantly modified and a district which linked urban Houston to rural East Texas counties would be redrawn. The map was passed by the State Senate's redistricting committee, and by the full Senate on party lines on June 6. A slightly different map from that passed by the Senate was passed by the House of Representatives' Redistricting Committee. The House map would lower the Hispanic population of Canseco's district by concentrating Hispanics in Democrat Charlie Gonzalez's district. The map was passed by the full House of Representatives on June 14. On June 20, the Senate voted to accept the House's amendments. The map was signed into law by Perry on July 18.

On September 13, the Civil Rights Division of the U.S. Department of Justice said that, based on a preliminary investigation, the map appeared to have been "adopted, at least in part, for the purpose of diminishing the ability of citizens of the United States, on account of race, color, or membership in a language minority group, to elect their preferred candidates of choice to Congress" and would have a discriminatory effect.

On November 8, a federal court refused to approve the Legislature's proposed map, thereby necessitating lengthy legal proceedings and the implementation of an interim map for the 2012 elections, to be drawn by a panel of federal judges. On November 23, a panel of three federal judges drew a map in which three of the four new districts would favor Democrats. However, three days later, Greg Abbott, the Texas Attorney General, announced that the state would file for an emergency stay from the U.S. Supreme Court. On December 9, the Supreme Court blocked the use of the map drawn by federal judges. This was expected to necessitate delaying the state's filing deadline and primary elections.

On January 20, 2012, the Supreme Court rejected the map drawn by the federal court, holding that the court had not paid enough attention to the maps drawn by the legislature, and sent the case back to the lower court.

== Overview ==
2012 United States House of Representatives elections in Texas
| Party | Votes | Percentage | Seats before | Seats after | +/– |
|---|---|---|---|---|---|
| Republican | 4,429,270 | 57.79% | 23 | 24 | +1 |
| Democratic | 2,949,900 | 38.49% | 9 | 12 | +3 |
| Libertarian | 246,587 | 3.22% | 0 | 0 | - |
| Green | 32,872 | 0.43% | 0 | 0 | - |
| Independent | 5,354 | 0.07% | 0 | 0 | - |
| Write-In | 255 | 0.00% | 0 | 0 | - |
| Totals | 7,664,208 | 100.00% | 32 | 36 | +4 |

== District 1 ==
2012 Texas's 1st congressional district election
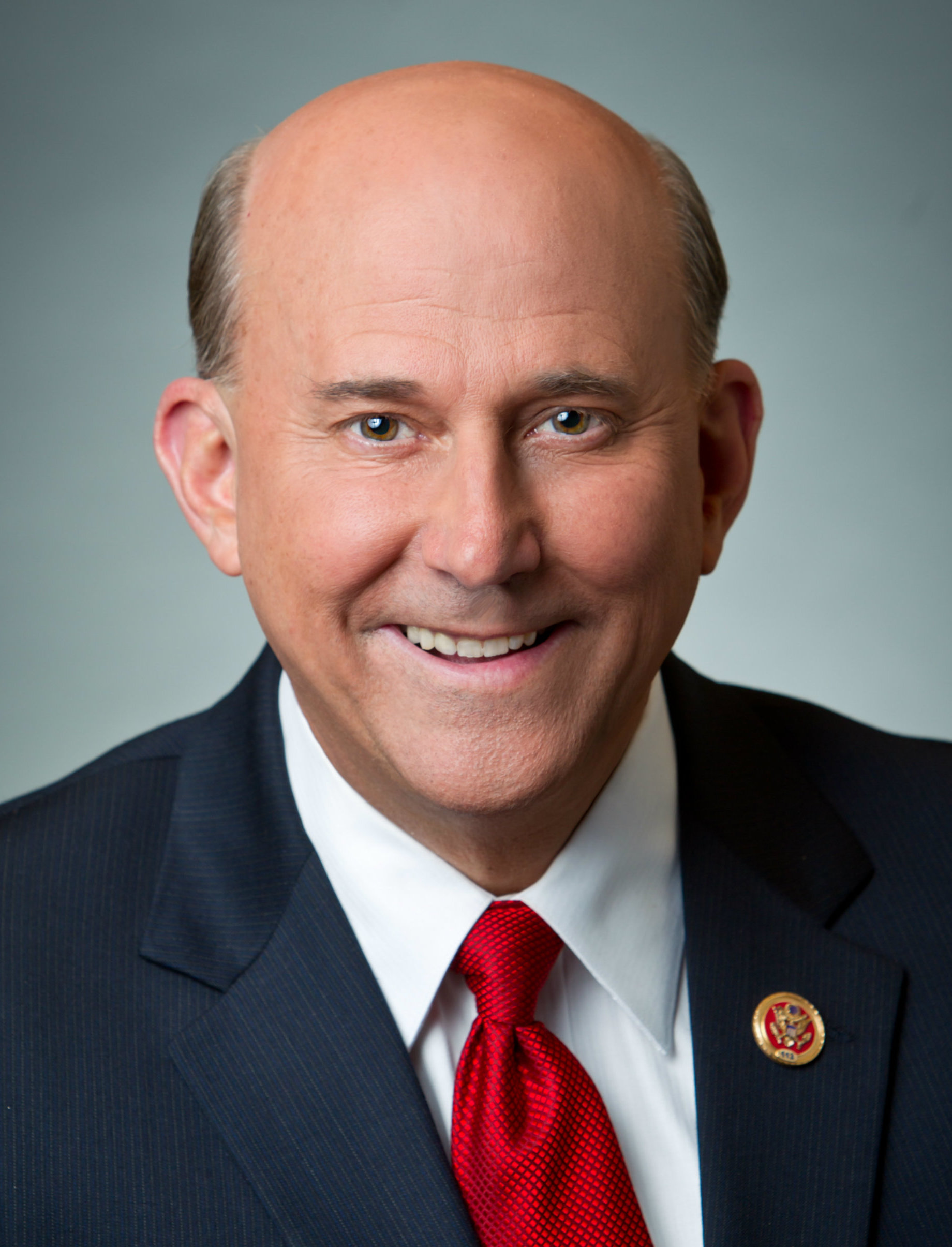

| Nominee | Louie Gohmert | Shirley McKellar |
| Party | Republican | Democratic |
| Popular vote | 173,322 | 62,222 |
| Percentage | 71.4% | 26.9% |
- County results Gohmert: 60–70% 70–80%
U.S. Representative before election
Louie Gohmert
Republican
Elected U.S. Representative
Louie Gohmert
Republican

Republican Louie Gohmert, who had represented Texas's 1st congressional district since 2005, ran for re-election.

=== Republican primary ===
==== Candidates ====
===== Nominee =====
- Louie Gohmert, incumbent U.S. Representative

==== Results ====
Republican Party primary results
| Party | Candidate | Votes | % |
|---|---|---|---|
| Republican | Louie Gohmert (incumbent) | 67,705 | 100.0 |
| Total votes | | 67,705 | 100.0 |

=== Democratic primary ===
==== Candidates ====
===== Nominee =====
- Shirley McKellar, Army veteran and non-profit businesswoman

==== Results ====
Democratic Party primary results
| Party | Candidate | Votes | % |
|---|---|---|---|
| Democratic | Shirley McKellar | 8,207 | 100.0 |
| Total votes | | 8,207 | 100.0 |

=== Libertarian primary ===
==== Candidates ====
===== Nominee =====
- Clark Patterson, photographer

=== General election ===
==== Predictions ====
| Source | Ranking | As of |
|---|---|---|
| The Cook Political Report | Safe R | November 5, 2012 |
| Rothenberg | Safe R | November 2, 2012 |
| Roll Call | Safe R | November 4, 2012 |
| Sabato's Crystal Ball | Safe R | November 5, 2012 |
| NY Times | Safe R | November 4, 2012 |
| RCP | Safe R | November 4, 2012 |
| The Hill | Safe R | November 4, 2012 |

==== Results ====
Texas 1st congressional district, 2012
| Party | Candidate | Votes | % |
|---|---|---|---|
| Republican | Louie Gohmert (incumbent) | 178,322 | 71.43 |
| Democratic | Shirley J. McKellar | 67,222 | 26.93 |
| Libertarian | Clark Patterson | 4,114 | 1.65 |
| Total votes | | 249,658 | 100.0 |
| Republican hold | | | |

== District 2 ==
2012 Texas's 2nd congressional district election
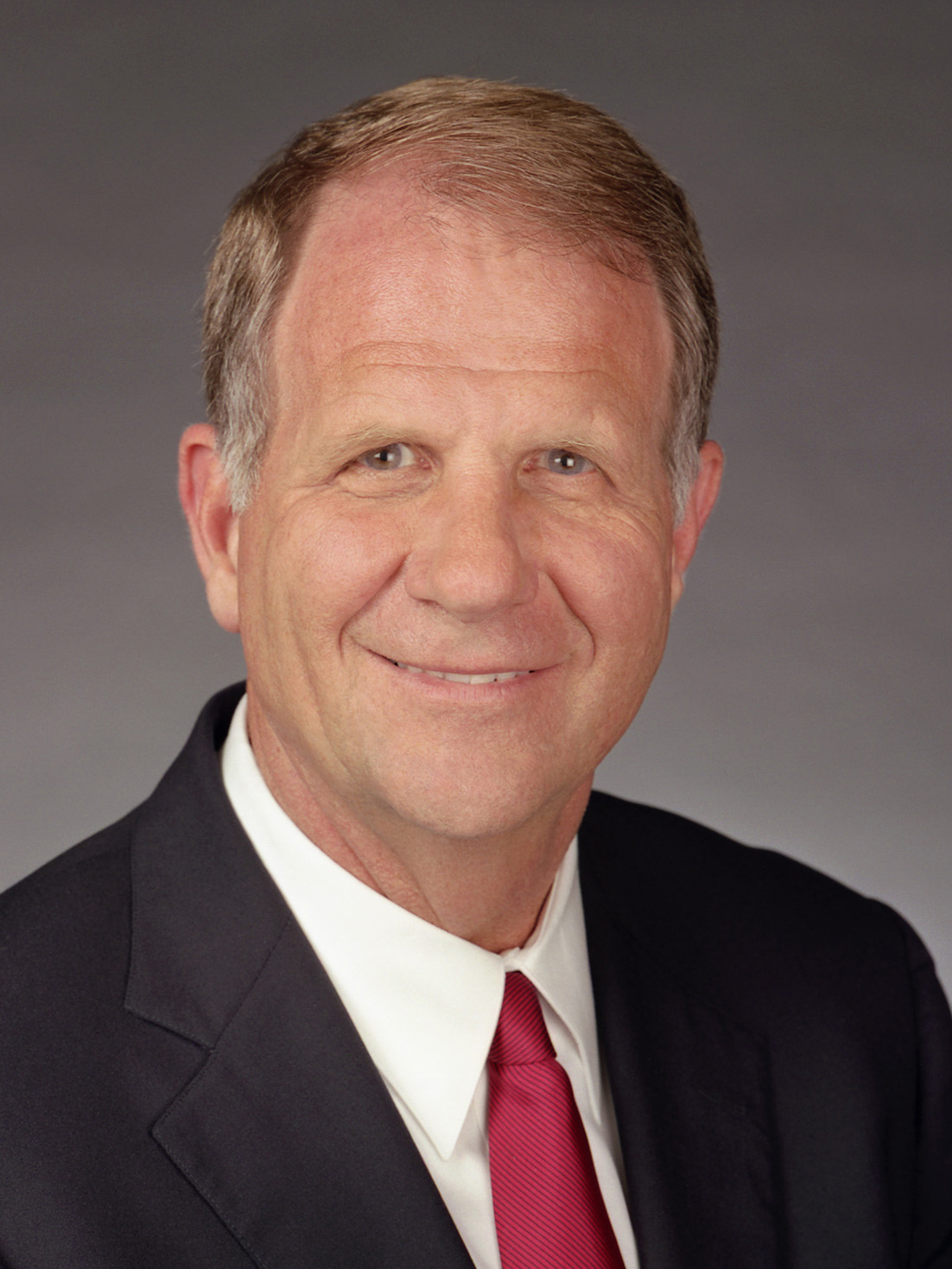

| Nominee | Ted Poe | Jim Dougherty |
| Party | Republican | Democratic |
| Popular vote | 159,664 | 80,512 |
| Percentage | 64.8% | 32.7% |
- County results Poe: 60–70%
U.S. Representative before election
Ted Poe
Republican
Elected U.S. Representative
Ted Poe
Republican

Republican Ted Poe, who had represented Texas's 2nd congressional district since 2005, ran for re-election.

=== Republican primary ===
==== Candidates ====
===== Nominee =====
- Ted Poe, incumbent U.S. Representative

==== Results ====
Republican Party primary results
| Party | Candidate | Votes | % |
|---|---|---|---|
| Republican | Ted Poe (incumbent) | 39,336 | 100.0 |
| Total votes | | 39,336 | 100.0 |

=== Democratic primary ===
==== Candidates ====
===== Nominee =====
- Jim Dougherty, attorney and CPA

==== Results ====
Democratic Party primary results
| Party | Candidate | Votes | % |
|---|---|---|---|
| Democratic | Jim Dougherty | 6,676 | 100.0 |
| Total votes | | 6,676 | 100.0 |

=== Libertarian primary ===
==== Candidates ====
===== Nominee =====
- Kenneth Duncan

=== Green primary ===
==== Candidates ====
===== Nominee =====
- Mark Roberts, teacher

=== General election ===
==== Predictions ====
| Source | Ranking | As of |
|---|---|---|
| The Cook Political Report | Safe R | November 5, 2012 |
| Rothenberg | Safe R | November 2, 2012 |
| Roll Call | Safe R | November 4, 2012 |
| Sabato's Crystal Ball | Safe R | November 5, 2012 |
| NY Times | Safe R | November 4, 2012 |
| RCP | Safe R | November 4, 2012 |
| The Hill | Safe R | November 4, 2012 |

==== Results ====
Texas 2nd congressional district, 2012
| Party | Candidate | Votes | % |
|---|---|---|---|
| Republican | Ted Poe (incumbent) | 159,664 | 64.82 |
| Democratic | Jim Dougherty | 80,512 | 32.68 |
| Libertarian | Kenneth Duncan | 4,140 | 1.68 |
| Green | Mark A. Roberts | 2,012 | 0.82 |
| Total votes | | 246,328 | 100.0 |
| Republican hold | | | |

== District 3 ==
2012 Texas's 3rd congressional district election
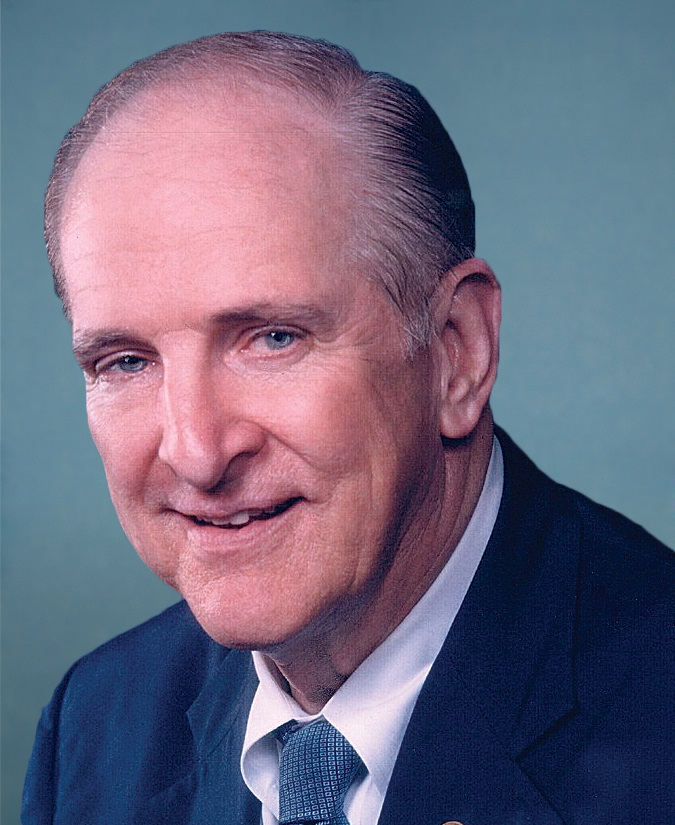
| Nominee | Sam Johnson |
| Party | Republican |
| Popular vote | 187,180 |
| Percentage | 100.0% |
U.S. Representative before election
Sam Johnson
Republican
Elected U.S. Representative
Sam Johnson
Republican

Republican Sam Johnson, who had represented Texas's 3rd congressional district since 1991, ran for re-election.

=== Republican primary ===
==== Candidates ====
===== Nominee =====
- Sam Johnson, incumbent U.S. Representative

===== Eliminated in primary =====
- Josh Caesar, software engineer
- Harry Pierce, Air Force veteran

==== Results ====
Republican Party primary results
| Party | Candidate | Votes | % |
|---|---|---|---|
| Republican | Sam Johnson (incumbent) | 33,592 | 83.06 |
| Republican | Harry Pierce | 4,848 | 11.98 |
| Republican | Josh Caesar | 2,002 | 4.95 |
| Total votes | | 40,442 | 100.0 |

=== General election ===
==== Predictions ====
| Source | Ranking | As of |
|---|---|---|
| The Cook Political Report | Safe R | November 5, 2012 |
| Rothenberg | Safe R | November 2, 2012 |
| Roll Call | Safe R | November 4, 2012 |
| Sabato's Crystal Ball | Safe R | November 5, 2012 |
| NY Times | Safe R | November 4, 2012 |
| RCP | Safe R | November 4, 2012 |
| The Hill | Safe R | November 4, 2012 |

==== Results ====
Texas 3rd congressional district, 2012
| Party | Candidate | Votes | % |
|---|---|---|---|
| Republican | Sam Johnson (incumbent) | 187,180 | 100.00 |
| Total votes | | 187,180 | 100.0 |
| Republican hold | | | |

== District 4 ==
2012 Texas's 4th congressional district election
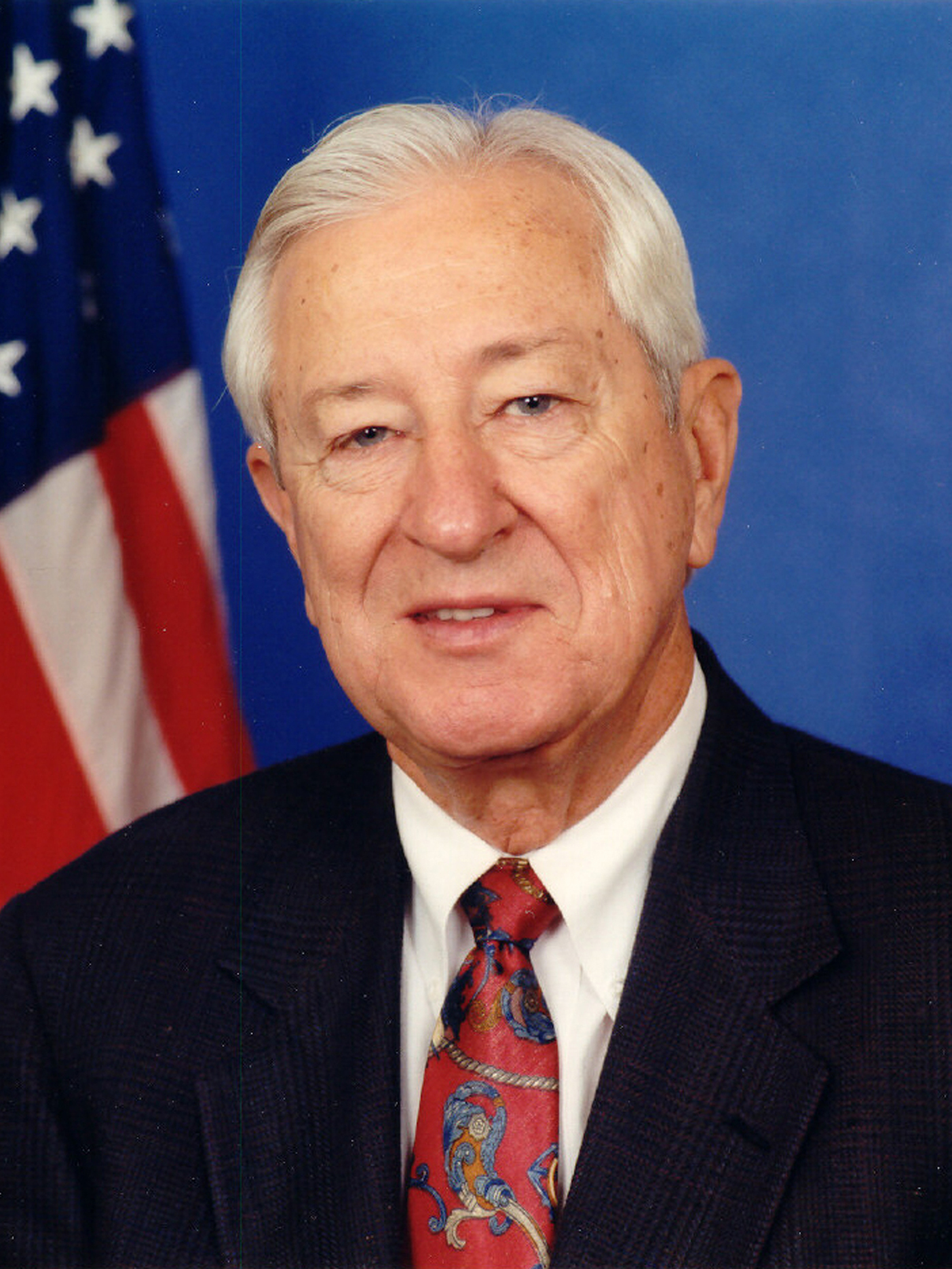

| Nominee | Ralph Hall | VaLinda Hathcox |
| Party | Republican | Democratic |
| Popular vote | 182,679 | 60,214 |
| Percentage | 73.0% | 24.1% |
- County results Hall: 60–70% 70–80%
U.S. Representative before election
Ralph Hall
Republican
Elected U.S. Representative
Ralph Hall
Republican

Republican Ralph Hall, who had represented Texas's 4th congressional district since 1981 (as a Democrat from 1981 to 2004), sought re-election.

=== Republican primary ===
There was speculation that Hall might retire due to his age - he was 89 years old - and a closer than usual primary in 2010 (though he still won with 57% of the vote). Hall faced two opponents in his party's May primary: businessman and 2010 primary candidate Steve Clark, and businessman Lou Gigliotti.

==== Candidates ====
===== Nominee =====
- Ralph Hall, incumbent U.S. Representative

===== Eliminated in primary =====
- Steve Clark, businessman and candidate for this seat in 2010
- Lou Gigliotti, businessman

===== Withdrawn =====
- John Cooper

==== Results ====
Republican Party primary results
| Party | Candidate | Votes | % |
|---|---|---|---|
| Republican | Ralph Hall (incumbent) | 38,202 | 58.4 |
| Republican | Steve Clark | 13,719 | 21.0 |
| Republican | Lou Gigliotti | 13,532 | 20.7 |
| Total votes | | 65,453 | 100.0 |

=== Democratic primary ===
==== Candidates ====
===== Nominee =====
- VaLinda Hathcox, attorney and nominee for this seat in 2010

==== Results ====
Democratic Party primary results
| Party | Candidate | Votes | % |
|---|---|---|---|
| Democratic | VaLinda Hathcox | 7,389 | 100.0 |
| Total votes | | 7,389 | 100.0 |

=== Libertarian primary ===
==== Candidates ====
===== Nominee =====
- Thomas Griffing

=== General election ===
==== Endorsements ====
Ralph Hall (R)

Newspapers

- Dallas Morning News

==== Predictions ====
| Source | Ranking | As of |
|---|---|---|
| The Cook Political Report | Safe R | November 5, 2012 |
| Rothenberg | Safe R | November 2, 2012 |
| Roll Call | Safe R | November 4, 2012 |
| Sabato's Crystal Ball | Safe R | November 5, 2012 |
| NY Times | Safe R | November 4, 2012 |
| RCP | Safe R | November 4, 2012 |
| The Hill | Safe R | November 4, 2012 |

==== Results ====
Texas 4th congressional district, 2012
| Party | Candidate | Votes | % |
|---|---|---|---|
| Republican | Ralph Hall (incumbent) | 182,679 | 72.97 |
| Democratic | VaLinda Hathcox | 60,214 | 24.05 |
| Libertarian | Thomas Griffing | 7,262 | 2.90 |
| Write-In | Fred Rostek | 188 | 0.08 |
| Total votes | | 250,343 | 100.0 |
| Republican hold | | | |

== District 5 ==
2012 Texas's 5th congressional district election
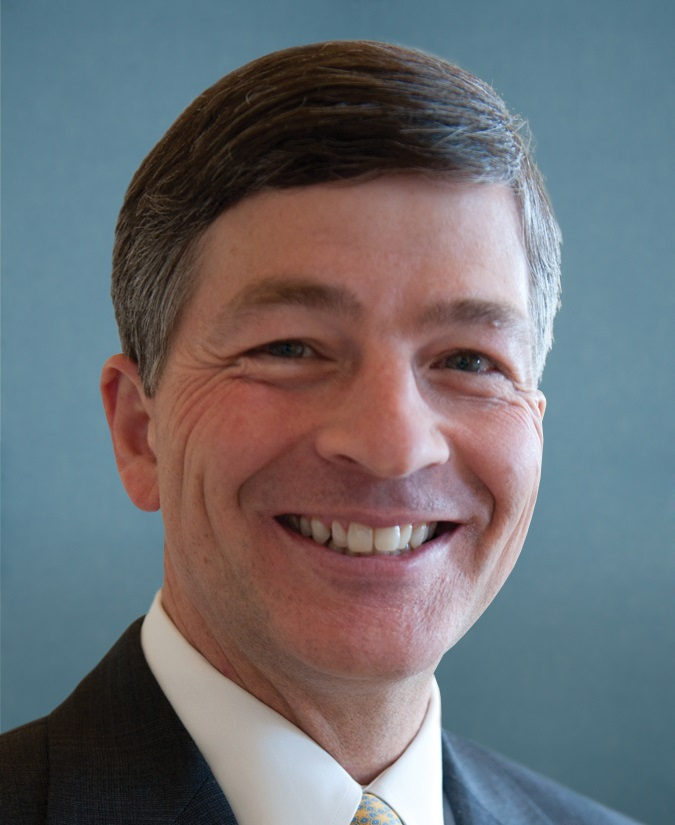

| Nominee | Jeb Hensarling | Linda Mrosko |
| Party | Republican | Democratic |
| Popular vote | 134,091 | 69,178 |
| Percentage | 64.4% | 33.2% |
- County results Hensarling: 60–70% 70–80%
U.S. Representative before election
Jeb Hensarling
Republican
Elected U.S. Representative
Jeb Hensarling
Republican

Republican Jeb Hensarling, who had represented Texas's 5th congressional district since 2003, ran for re-election.

=== Republican primary ===
==== Candidates ====
===== Nominee =====
- Jeb Hensarling, incumbent U.S. Representative

==== Results ====
Republican Party primary results
| Party | Candidate | Votes | % |
|---|---|---|---|
| Republican | Jeb Hensarling (incumbent) | 41,348 | 100.0 |
| Total votes | | 41,348 | 100.0 |

=== Democratic primary ===
==== Candidates ====
===== Nominee =====
- Linda Mrosko, legal assistant

===== Eliminated in primary =====
- Tom Berry, U.S. Navy veteran, retired train conductor, nominee for Illinois 6th in 1994 & 2002 and nominee for this seat in 2010
- Pat Wallace

==== Results ====
Democratic Party primary results
| Party | Candidate | Votes | % |
|---|---|---|---|
| Democratic | Linda Mrosko | 2,778 | 39.15 |
| Democratic | Tom Berry | 2,219 | 31.27 |
| Democratic | Pat Wallace | 2,097 | 29.56 |
| Total votes | | 7,094 | 100.00 |
Runoff election
| Democratic | Linda Mrosko | 1,848 | 60.82 |
| Democratic | Tom Berry | 1,190 | 39.18 |
| Total votes | | 3,038 | 100.00 |

=== Libertarian primary ===
==== Candidates ====
===== Nominee =====
- Ken Ashby, teacher, engineer and nominee for this seat in 2010

=== General election ===
==== Endorsements ====
Jeb Hensarling (R)

Newspapers

- Dallas Morning News

==== Predictions ====
| Source | Ranking | As of |
|---|---|---|
| The Cook Political Report | Safe R | November 5, 2012 |
| Rothenberg | Safe R | November 2, 2012 |
| Roll Call | Safe R | November 4, 2012 |
| Sabato's Crystal Ball | Safe R | November 5, 2012 |
| NY Times | Safe R | November 4, 2012 |
| RCP | Safe R | November 4, 2012 |
| The Hill | Safe R | November 4, 2012 |

==== Results ====
Texas 5th congressional district, 2012
| Party | Candidate | Votes | % |
|---|---|---|---|
| Republican | Jeb Hensarling (incumbent) | 134,091 | 64.40 |
| Democratic | Linda Mrosko | 69,178 | 33.22 |
| Libertarian | Ken Ashby | 4,961 | 2.38 |
| Total votes | | 208,230 | 100.0 |
| Republican hold | | | |

== District 6 ==
2012 Texas's 6th congressional district election
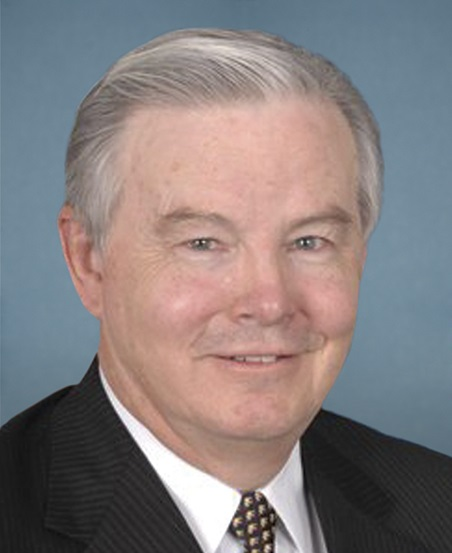

| Nominee | Joe Barton | Kenneth Sanders |
| Party | Republican | Democratic |
| Popular vote | 145,019 | 98,053 |
| Percentage | 58.0% | 39.2% |
- County results Barton: 50–60% 70–80%
U.S. Representative before election
Joe Barton
Republican
Elected U.S. Representative
Joe Barton
Republican

Republican Joe Barton, who had represented Texas's 6th congressional district since 1985, ran for re-election.

=== Republican primary ===
==== Candidates ====
===== Nominee =====
- Joe Barton, incumbent U.S. Representative

===== Eliminated in primary =====
- Joe Chow, former mayor of Addison
- Itamar Gelbman, Israeli-American security consultant
- Frank Kuchar, accountant

==== Results ====
Republican Party primary results
| Party | Candidate | Votes | % |
|---|---|---|---|
| Republican | Joe Barton (incumbent) | 26,192 | 63.22 |
| Republican | Joe Chow | 8,154 | 19.68 |
| Republican | Frank C. Kuchar | 4,725 | 11.40 |
| Republican | Itamar Gelbman | 2,356 | 5.68 |
| Total votes | | 41,427 | 100 |

=== Democratic primary ===
==== Candidates ====
===== Nominee =====
- Kenneth Sanders, manufacturing consultant

===== Eliminated in primary =====
- Brianna Hinojosa-Flores, attorney
- Don Jaquess, businessman

===== Withdrawn =====
- David Alameel, dentist and horse racing advocate (running in the 33rd)

===== Declined =====
- Chet Edwards, former U.S. Representative
- Chris Turner, former state representative
- Allen Vaught, former state representative

==== Results ====
Democratic Party primary results
| Party | Candidate | Votes | % |
|---|---|---|---|
| Democratic | Kenneth Sanders | 6,609 | 61.25 |
| Democratic | Brianna Hinojosa-Flores | 3,483 | 32.27 |
| Democratic | Don Jaquess | 698 | 6.46 |
| Total votes | | 10,790 | 100 |

=== Libertarian primary ===
==== Candidates ====
===== Nominee =====
- Hugh Chavin, construction manager and former U.S. Air Force staff sergeant

=== Green primary ===
==== Candidates ====
===== Nominee =====
- Brandon Parmer

=== General election ===
==== Endorsements ====
Joe Barton (R)

Newspapers

- Dallas Morning News

==== Predictions ====
| Source | Ranking | As of |
|---|---|---|
| The Cook Political Report | Safe R | November 5, 2012 |
| Rothenberg | Safe R | November 2, 2012 |
| Roll Call | Safe R | November 4, 2012 |
| Sabato's Crystal Ball | Safe R | November 5, 2012 |
| NY Times | Safe R | November 4, 2012 |
| RCP | Safe R | November 4, 2012 |
| The Hill | Safe R | November 4, 2012 |

==== Results ====
Texas 6th congressional district, 2012
| Party | Candidate | Votes | % |
|---|---|---|---|
| Republican | Joe Barton (incumbent) | 145,019 | 58.02 |
| Democratic | Kenneth Sanders | 98,053 | 39.23 |
| Libertarian | Hugh Chavin | 4,847 | 1.94 |
| Green | Brandon Parmer | 2,017 | 0.81 |
| Total votes | | 249,936 | 100.0 |
| Republican hold | | | |

== District 7 ==
2012 Texas's 7th congressional district election
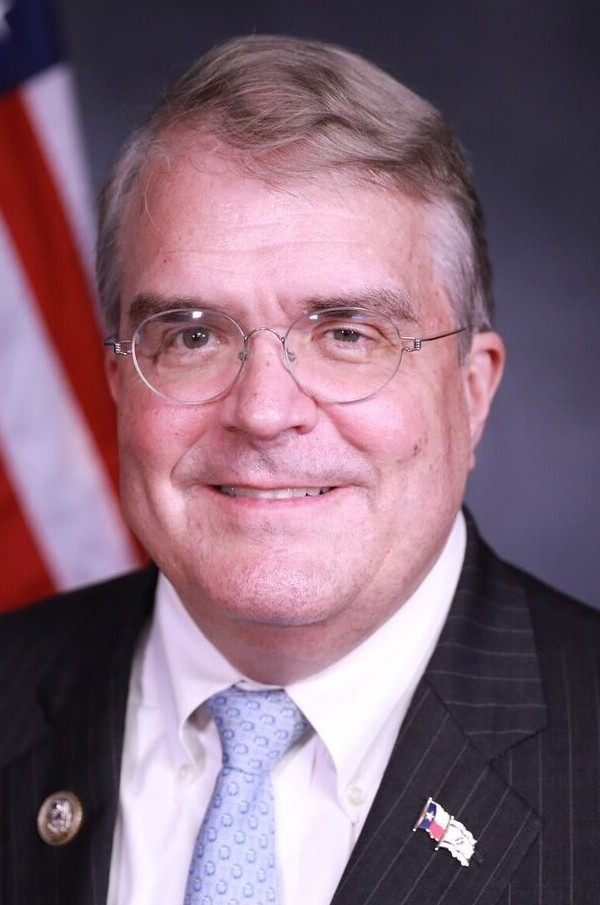

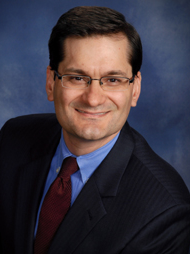
| Nominee | John Culberson | James Cargas |
| Party | Republican | Democratic |
| Popular vote | 142,793 | 85,553 |
| Percentage | 60.8% | 36.4% |
- County results Culberson: 60–70%
U.S. Representative before election
John Culberson
Republican
Elected U.S. Representative
John Culberson
Republican

Republican John Culberson, who had represented Texas's 7th congressional district since 2003, ran for re-election.

=== Republican primary ===
==== Candidates ====
===== Nominee =====
- John Culberson, incumbent U.S. Representative

===== Eliminated in primary =====
- Bill Tofte

==== Results ====
Republican Party primary results
| Party | Candidate | Votes | % |
|---|---|---|---|
| Republican | John Culberson (incumbent) | 37,590 | 86.3 |
| Republican | Bill Tofte | 5,971 | 13.7 |
| Total votes | | 43,561 | 100.0 |

=== Democratic primary ===
==== Candidates ====
===== Nominee =====
- James Cargas, energy lawyer for the City of Houston

===== Eliminated in primary =====
- Phillip Andrews, accountant and nominee for the State House in 2010
- Lissa Squiers, activist

==== Results ====
Democratic Party primary results
| Party | Candidate | Votes | % |
|---|---|---|---|
| Democratic | Lissa Squiers | 2,848 | 39.9 |
| Democratic | James Cargas | 2,410 | 33.8 |
| Democratic | Phillip Andrews | 1,876 | 26.3 |
| Total votes | | 7,134 | 100.0 |
Runoff election
| Democratic | James Cargas | 2,121 | 57.9 |
| Democratic | Lissa Squiers | 1,545 | 42.1 |
| Total votes | | 3,666 | 100.00 |

=== Libertarian primary ===
==== Candidates ====
===== Nominee =====
- Drew Parks

=== Green primary ===
==== Candidates ====
===== Nominee =====
- Lance Findley

=== General election ===
==== Predictions ====
| Source | Ranking | As of |
|---|---|---|
| The Cook Political Report | Safe R | November 5, 2012 |
| Rothenberg | Safe R | November 2, 2012 |
| Roll Call | Safe R | November 4, 2012 |
| Sabato's Crystal Ball | Safe R | November 5, 2012 |
| NY Times | Safe R | November 4, 2012 |
| RCP | Safe R | November 4, 2012 |
| The Hill | Safe R | November 4, 2012 |

==== Results ====
Texas 7th congressional district, 2012
| Party | Candidate | Votes | % |
|---|---|---|---|
| Republican | John Culberson (incumbent) | 142,793 | 60.81 |
| Democratic | James Cargas | 85,553 | 36.43 |
| Libertarian | Drew Parks | 4,669 | 1.99 |
| Green | Lance Findley | 1,822 | 0.78 |
| Total votes | | 234,837 | 100.0 |
| Republican hold | | | |

== District 8 ==
2012 Texas's 8th congressional district election
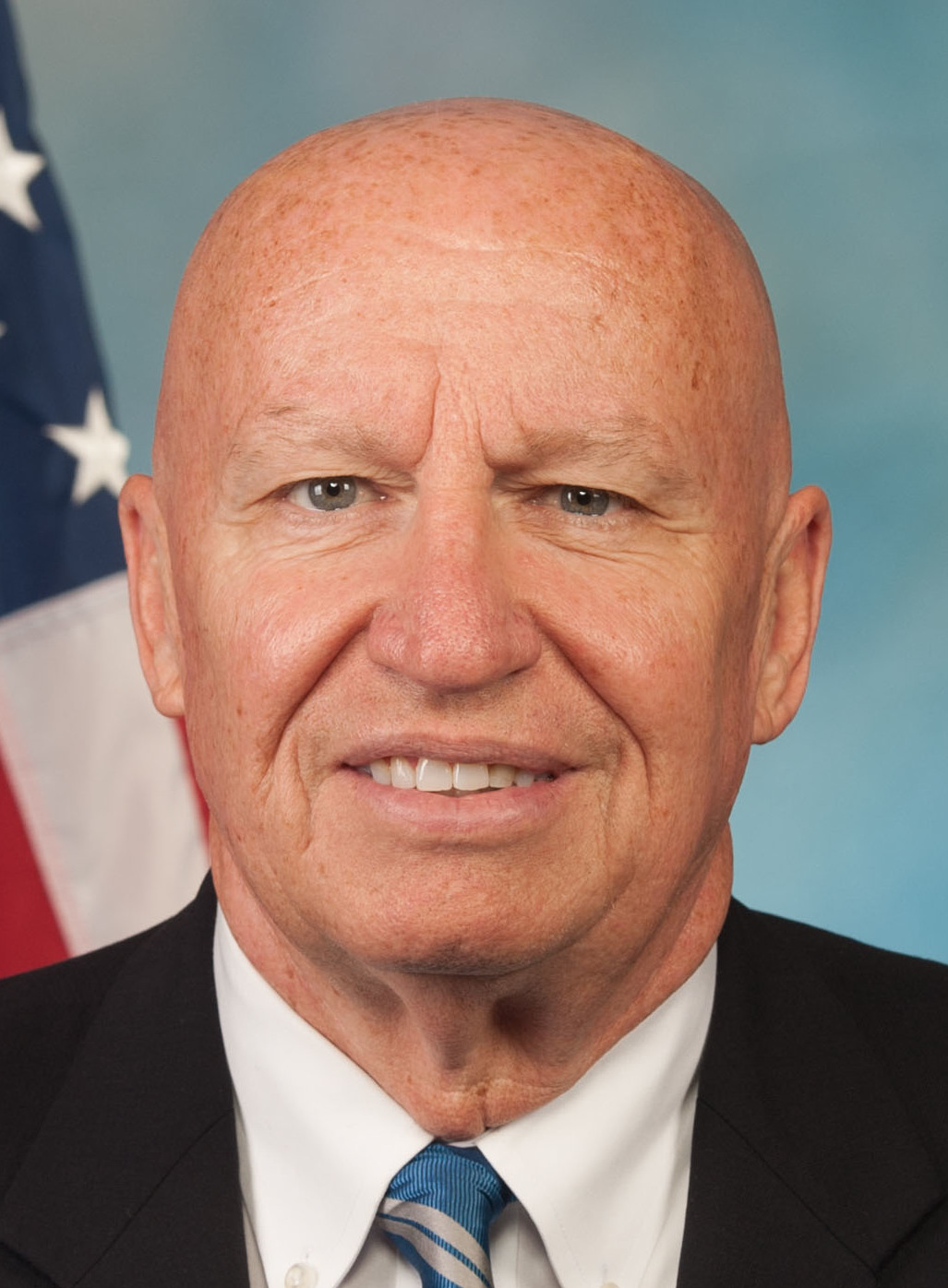

| Nominee | Kevin Brady | Neil Burns |
| Party | Republican | Democratic |
| Popular vote | 194,043 | 51,051 |
| Percentage | 77.3% | 20.3% |
- County results Brady: 60–70% 70–80% 80–90%
U.S. Representative before election
Kevin Brady
Republican
Elected U.S. Representative
Kevin Brady
Republican

Republican Kevin Brady, who had represented Texas's 8th congressional district since 1997, ran for re-election.

=== Republican primary ===
==== Candidates ====
===== Nominee =====
- Kevin Brady, incumbent U.S. Representative

===== Eliminated in primary =====
- Larry Youngblood, computer consultant

===== Withdrawn =====
- Chris Irish, health care consultant for Pfizer and founder of the North Houston Tea Party Patriots

===== Declined =====
- Scott Baker, businessman

==== Results ====
Republican Party primary results
| Party | Candidate | Votes | % |
|---|---|---|---|
| Republican | Kevin Brady (incumbent) | 48,366 | 76.1 |
| Republican | Larry Youngblood | 15,181 | 23.9 |
| Total votes | | 63,547 | 100.0 |

=== Democratic primary ===
==== Candidates ====
===== Nominee =====
- Neil Burns, former executive at the Shell Oil Company

===== Declined =====
- James Wright, retiree from New Caney and nominee for this seat in 2004 and 2006

==== Results ====
Democratic Party primary results
| Party | Candidate | Votes | % |
|---|---|---|---|
| Democratic | Neil Burns | 5,789 | 100.0 |
| Total votes | | 5,789 | 100.0 |

=== Libertarian primary ===
==== Candidates ====
===== Nominee =====
- Roy Hall

=== General election ===
==== Predictions ====
| Source | Ranking | As of |
|---|---|---|
| The Cook Political Report | Safe R | November 5, 2012 |
| Rothenberg | Safe R | November 2, 2012 |
| Roll Call | Safe R | November 4, 2012 |
| Sabato's Crystal Ball | Safe R | November 5, 2012 |
| NY Times | Safe R | November 4, 2012 |
| RCP | Safe R | November 4, 2012 |
| The Hill | Safe R | November 4, 2012 |

==== Results ====
Texas 8th congressional district, 2012
| Party | Candidate | Votes | % |
|---|---|---|---|
| Republican | Kevin Brady (incumbent) | 194,043 | 77.29 |
| Democratic | Neil Burns | 51,051 | 20.33 |
| Libertarian | Roy Hall | 5,958 | 2.37 |
| Total votes | | 251,052 | 100.0 |
| Republican hold | | | |

== District 9 ==
2012 Texas's 9th congressional district election
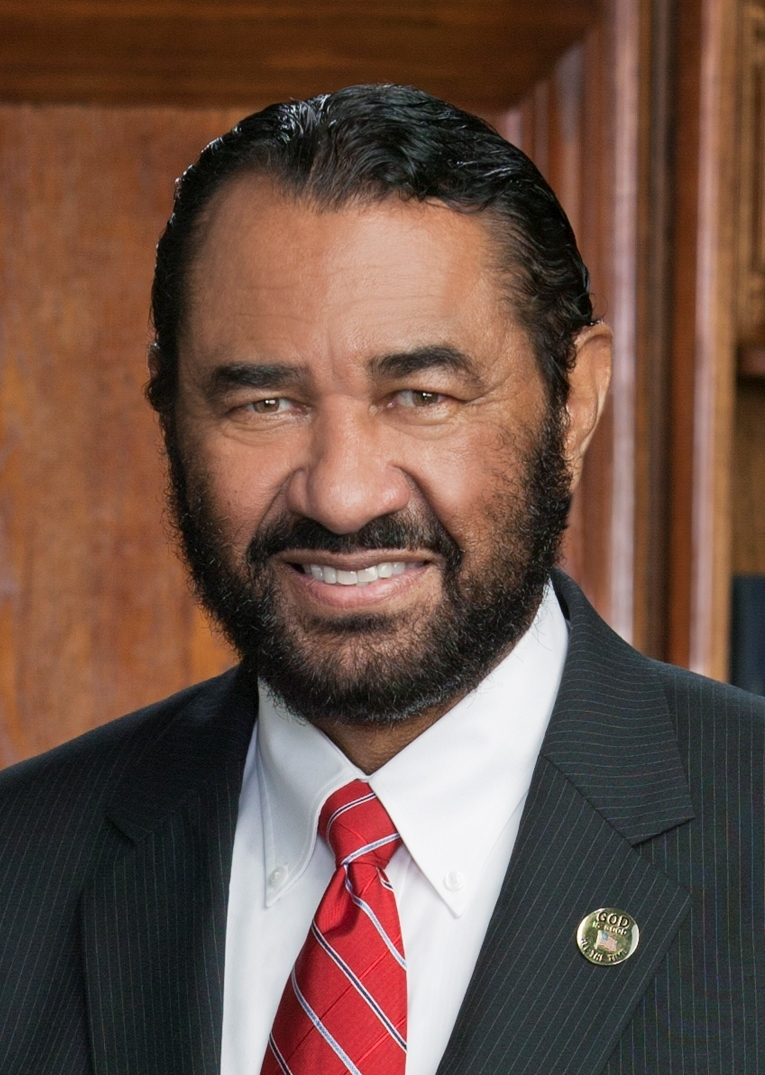

| Nominee | Al Green | Steve Mueller |
| Party | Democratic | Republican |
| Popular vote | 144,075 | 36,139 |
| Percentage | 78.5% | 19.7% |
- County results Green: 70–80%
U.S. Representative before election
Al Green
Democratic
Elected U.S. Representative
Al Green
Democratic

Democrat Al Green, who had represented Texas's 9th congressional district since 2005, ran for re-election.

=== Democratic primary ===
==== Candidates ====
===== Nominee =====
- Al Green, incumbent U.S. Representative

==== Results ====
Democratic Party primary results
| Party | Candidate | Votes | % |
|---|---|---|---|
| Democratic | Al Green (incumbent) | 20,917 | 100.0 |
| Total votes | | 20,917 | 100.0 |

=== Republican primary ===
==== Candidates ====
===== Nominee =====
- Steve Mueller, business analyst, activist and nominee for this seat in 2010

==== Results ====
Republican Party primary results
| Party | Candidate | Votes | % |
|---|---|---|---|
| Republican | Steve Mueller | 7,255 | 100.0 |
| Total votes | | 7,255 | 100.0 |

=== Libertarian primary ===
==== Candidates ====
===== Nominee =====
- John Wieder, clergy member

=== Green primary ===
==== Candidates ====
===== Nominee =====
- Vanessa Foster

=== General election ===
==== Predictions ====
| Source | Ranking | As of |
|---|---|---|
| The Cook Political Report | Safe D | November 5, 2012 |
| Rothenberg | Safe D | November 2, 2012 |
| Roll Call | Safe D | November 4, 2012 |
| Sabato's Crystal Ball | Safe D | November 5, 2012 |
| NY Times | Safe D | November 4, 2012 |
| RCP | Safe D | November 4, 2012 |
| The Hill | Safe D | November 4, 2012 |

==== Results ====
Texas 9th congressional district, 2012
| Party | Candidate | Votes | % |
|---|---|---|---|
| Democratic | Al Green (incumbent) | 144,075 | 78.49 |
| Republican | Steve Mueller | 36,139 | 19.69 |
| Green | Vanessa Foster | 1,743 | 0.95 |
| Libertarian | John Wieder | 1,609 | 0.88 |
| Total votes | | 183,566 | 100.0 |
| Democratic hold | | | |

== District 10 ==
2012 Texas's 10th congressional district election
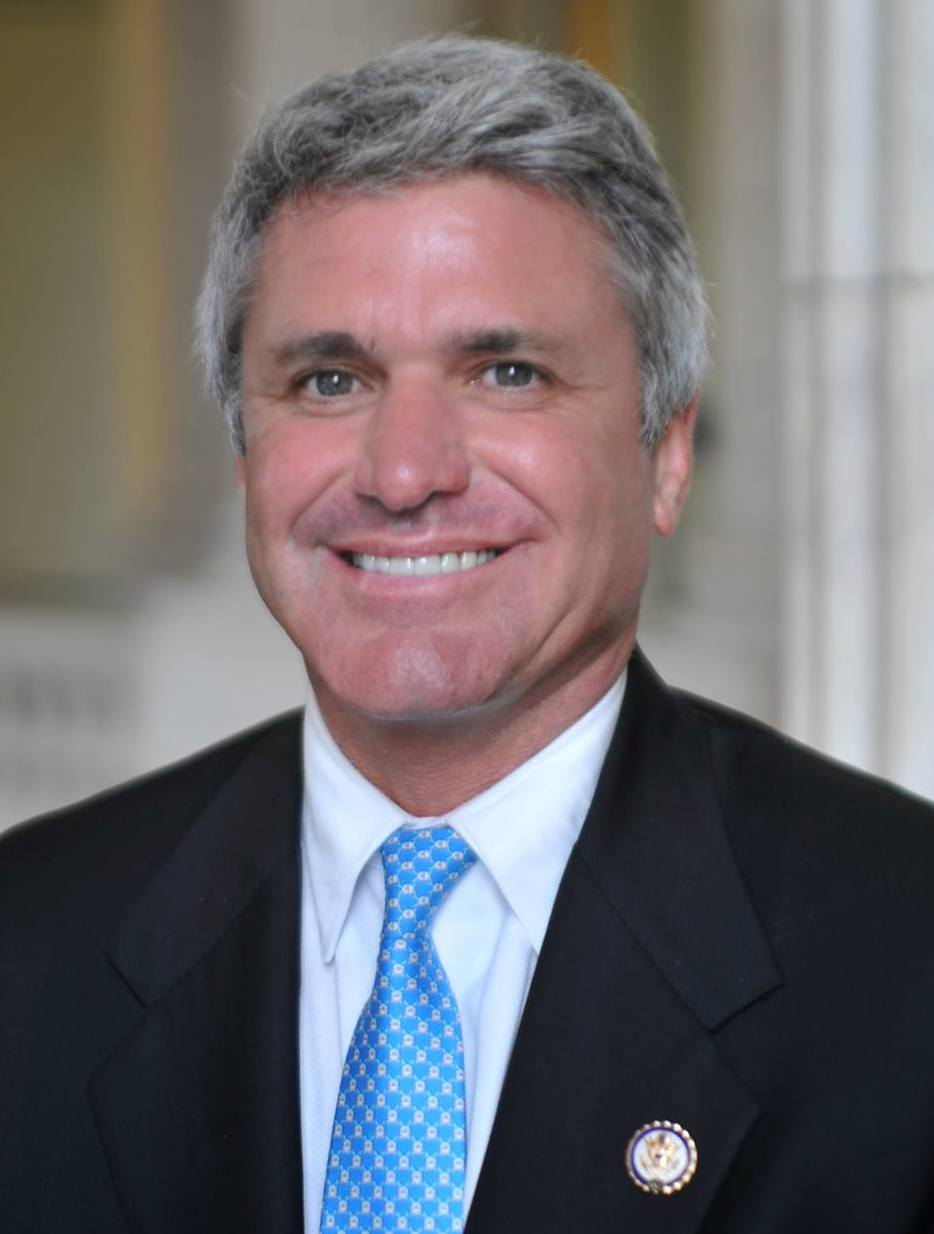

| Nominee | Michael McCaul | Tawana Walter-Cadien |
| Party | Republican | Democratic |
| Popular vote | 159,783 | 95,710 |
| Percentage | 60.5% | 36.3% |
- County results Mccaul: 50–60% 60–70% 70–80% 80–90% Cadien: 50–60%
U.S. Representative before election
Michael McCaul
Republican
Elected U.S. Representative
Michael McCaul
Republican

Republican Michael McCaul, who had represented Texas's 10th congressional district since 2005, ran for re-election. He did not seek the open U.S. Senate seat.

=== Republican primary ===
==== Candidates ====
===== Nominee =====
- Michael McCaul, incumbent U.S. Representative

===== Eliminated in primary =====
- Eddie Traylor, pilot

==== Results ====
Republican Party primary results
| Party | Candidate | Votes | % |
|---|---|---|---|
| Republican | Michael McCaul (incumbent) | 39,543 | 83.8 |
| Republican | Eddie Traylor | 7,664 | 16.2 |
| Total votes | | 47,207 | 100.0 |

=== Democratic primary ===
==== Candidates ====
===== Nominee =====
- Tawana Walter-Cadien, consultant, registered nurse, MMA surgery supervisor and quality assurance director

===== Eliminated in primary =====
- William Miller Jr.

===== Withdrawn =====
- Dan Grant, foreign policy expert and candidate for this seat in 2008

===== Declined =====
- Larry Joe Doherty, attorney, TV show host and nominee for this seat in 2008
- Michael Peter Skelly, entrepreneur and nominee for the 7th district in 2008

==== Results ====
Democratic Party primary results
| Party | Candidate | Votes | % |
|---|---|---|---|
| Democratic | Tawana Walter-Cadien | 8,061 | 56.65 |
| Democratic | William E. Miller, Jr. | 6,169 | 43.35 |
| Total votes | | 14,230 | 100.0 |

=== Libertarian primary ===
==== Candidates ====
===== Nominee =====
- Richard Priest

=== General election ===
==== Endorsements ====
Tawana Walter-Cadien (D)

Newspapers

- The Austin Chronicle

==== Predictions ====
| Source | Ranking | As of |
|---|---|---|
| The Cook Political Report | Safe R | November 5, 2012 |
| Rothenberg | Safe R | November 2, 2012 |
| Roll Call | Safe R | November 4, 2012 |
| Sabato's Crystal Ball | Safe R | November 5, 2012 |
| NY Times | Safe R | November 4, 2012 |
| RCP | Safe R | November 4, 2012 |
| The Hill | Likely R | November 4, 2012 |

==== Results ====
Texas 10th congressional district, 2012
| Party | Candidate | Votes | % |
|---|---|---|---|
| Republican | Michael McCaul (incumbent) | 159,783 | 60.52 |
| Democratic | Tawana Walter-Cadien | 95,710 | 36.25 |
| Libertarian | Richard Priest | 8,526 | 3.23 |
| Total votes | | 264,019 | 100.0 |
| Republican hold | | | |

== District 11 ==
2012 Texas's 11th congressional district election
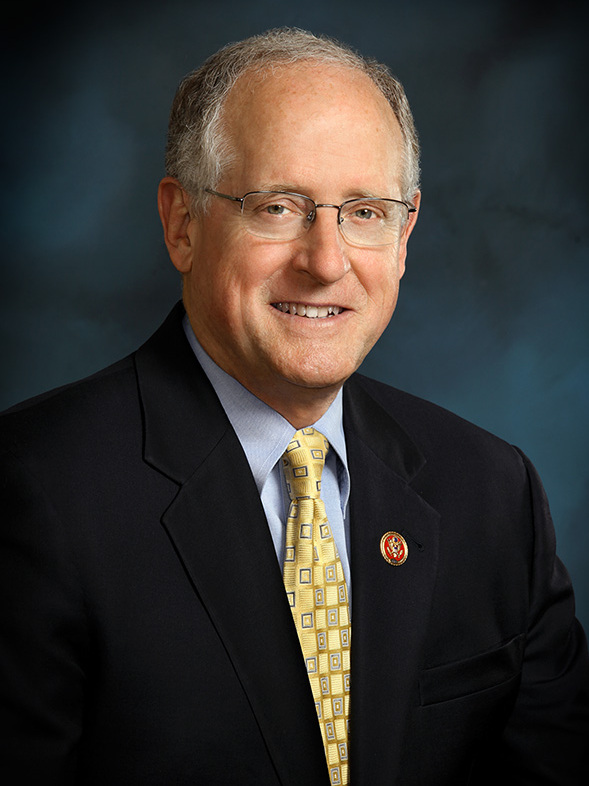

| Nominee | Mike Conaway | Jim Riley |
| Party | Republican | Democratic |
| Popular vote | 177,742 | 41,970 |
| Percentage | 78.6% | 18.6% |
- County results Conaway: 70–80% 80–90% 90–100%
U.S. Representative before election
Mike Conaway
Republican
Elected U.S. Representative
Mike Conaway
Republican

Republican Mike Conaway, who had represented Texas's 11th congressional district since 2005, ran for re-election.

=== Republican primary ===
==== Candidates ====
===== Nominee =====
- Mike Conaway, incumbent U.S. Representative

===== Eliminated in primary =====
- Wade Brown, real estate investor
- Chris Younts, insurance agent and co-founder of the San Angelo Tea Party

==== Results ====
Republican Party primary results
| Party | Candidate | Votes | % |
|---|---|---|---|
| Republican | Mike Conaway (incumbent) | 48,581 | 70.4 |
| Republican | Chris Younts | 12,917 | 18.7 |
| Republican | Wade Brown | 7,547 | 10.9 |
| Total votes | | 69,045 | 100.0 |

=== Democratic primary ===
==== Candidates ====
===== Nominee =====
- Jim Riley, businessman

==== Results ====
Democratic Party primary results
| Party | Candidate | Votes | % |
|---|---|---|---|
| Democratic | Jim Riley | 4,322 | 100.0 |
| Total votes | | 4,322 | 100.0 |

=== Libertarian primary ===
==== Candidates ====
===== Nominee =====
- Scott Ballard

=== General election ===
==== Predictions ====
| Source | Ranking | As of |
|---|---|---|
| The Cook Political Report | Safe R | November 5, 2012 |
| Rothenberg | Safe R | November 2, 2012 |
| Roll Call | Safe R | November 4, 2012 |
| Sabato's Crystal Ball | Safe R | November 5, 2012 |
| NY Times | Safe R | November 4, 2012 |
| RCP | Safe R | November 4, 2012 |
| The Hill | Safe R | November 4, 2012 |

==== Results ====
Texas 11th congressional district, 2012
| Party | Candidate | Votes | % |
|---|---|---|---|
| Republican | Mike Conaway (incumbent) | 177,742 | 78.64 |
| Democratic | Jim Riley | 41,970 | 18.57 |
| Libertarian | Scott J. Ballard | 6,311 | 2.79 |
| Total votes | | 226,023 | 100.0 |
| Republican hold | | | |

== District 12 ==
2012 Texas's 12th congressional district election
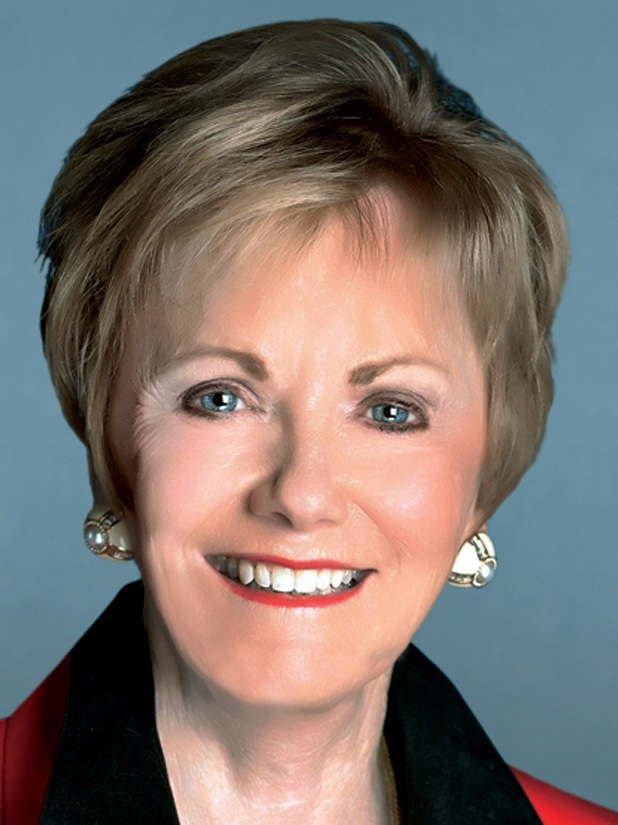

| Nominee | Kay Granger | Dave Robinson |
| Party | Republican | Democratic |
| Popular vote | 175,649 | 66,080 |
| Percentage | 70.9% | 26.7% |
- County results Granger: 60–70% 70–80%
U.S. Representative before election
Kay Granger
Republican
Elected U.S. Representative
Kay Granger
Republican

Republican Kay Granger, who had represented Texas's 12th congressional district since 1997, ran for re-election.

=== Republican primary ===
==== Candidates ====
===== Nominee =====
- Kay Granger, incumbent U.S. Representative

===== Eliminated in primary =====
- Bill Lawrence, former mayor of Highland Village

==== Results ====
Republican Party primary results
| Party | Candidate | Votes | % |
|---|---|---|---|
| Republican | Kay Granger (incumbent) | 34,828 | 80.2 |
| Republican | Bill Lawrence | 8,611 | 19.8 |
| Total votes | | 43,439 | 100.0 |

=== Democratic primary ===
==== Candidates ====
===== Nominee =====
- Dave Robinson, retired schoolteacher and veteran

==== Results ====
Democratic Party primary results
| Party | Candidate | Votes | % |
|---|---|---|---|
| Democratic | Dave Robinson | 6,530 | 100.0 |
| Total votes | | 6,530 | 100.0 |

=== Libertarian primary ===
==== Candidates ====
===== Nominee =====
- Matthew Solodow, senior project manager

=== General election ===
==== Endorsements ====
Kay Granger (R)

Organizations

- Maggie's List

==== Predictions ====
| Source | Ranking | As of |
|---|---|---|
| The Cook Political Report | Safe R | November 5, 2012 |
| Rothenberg | Safe R | November 2, 2012 |
| Roll Call | Safe R | November 4, 2012 |
| Sabato's Crystal Ball | Safe R | November 5, 2012 |
| NY Times | Safe R | November 4, 2012 |
| RCP | Safe R | November 4, 2012 |
| The Hill | Safe R | November 4, 2012 |

==== Results ====
Texas 12th congressional district, 2012
| Party | Candidate | Votes | % |
|---|---|---|---|
| Republican | Kay Granger (incumbent) | 175,649 | 70.91 |
| Democratic | Dave Robinson | 66,080 | 26.68 |
| Libertarian | Matthew Solodow | 5,983 | 2.42 |
| Total votes | | 247,712 | 100.0 |
| Republican hold | | | |

== District 13 ==
2012 Texas's 13th congressional district election
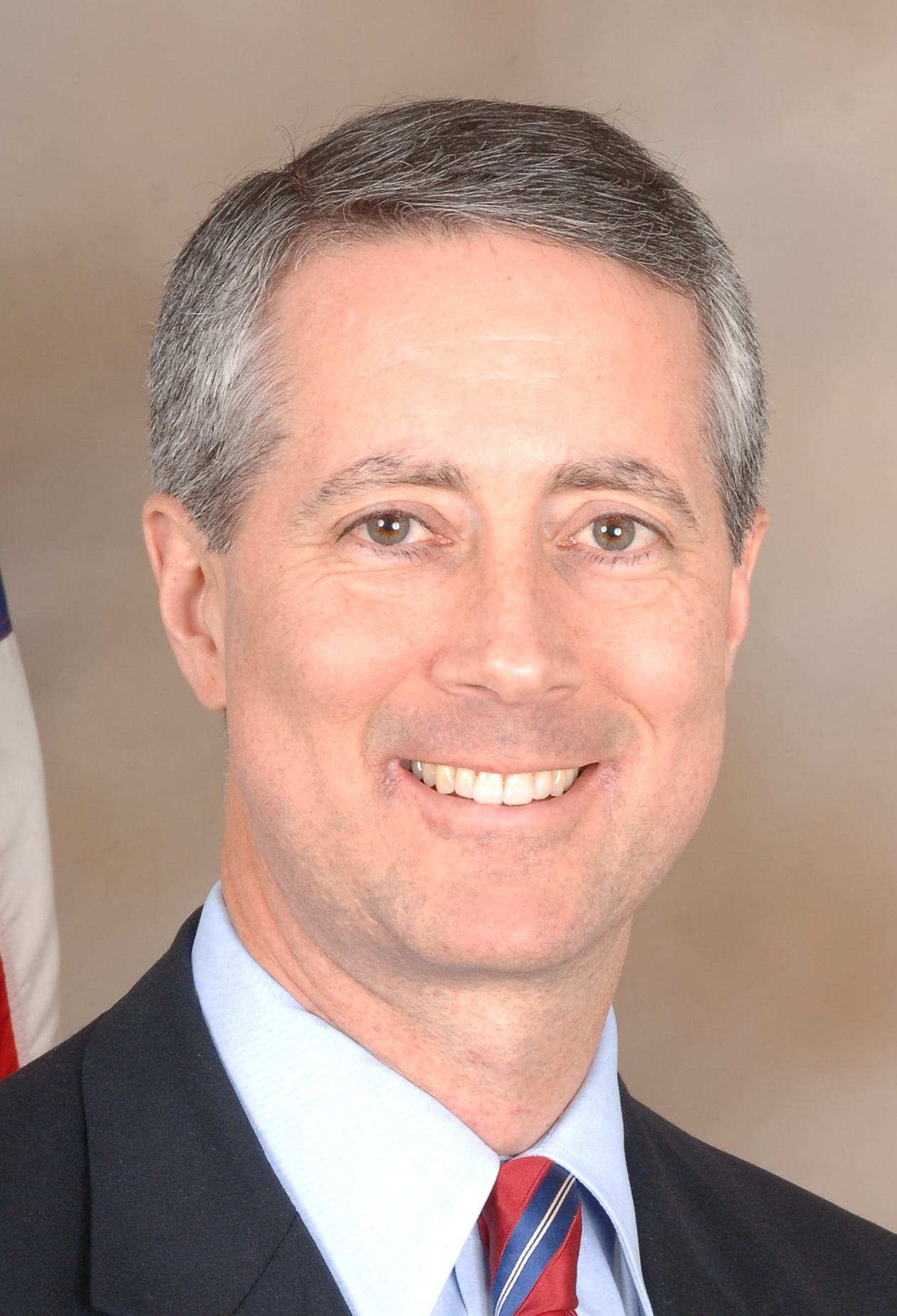

| Nominee | Mac Thornberry | John Robert Deek |
| Party | Republican | Libertarian |
| Popular vote | 187,775 | 12,701 |
| Percentage | 91.0% | 6.2% |
- County results Thornberry: 70–80% 80–90%
U.S. Representative before election
Mac Thornberry
Republican
Elected U.S. Representative
Mac Thornberry
Republican

Republican Mac Thornberry, who had represented Texas's 13th congressional district since 1995, sought re-election.

=== Republican primary ===
==== Candidates ====
===== Nominee =====
- Mac Thornberry, incumbent U.S. Representative

===== Eliminated in primary =====
- Pam Barlow, veterinarian

==== Results ====
Republican Party primary results
| Party | Candidate | Votes | % |
|---|---|---|---|
| Republican | Mac Thornberry (incumbent) | 47,051 | 77.5 |
| Republican | Pam Barlow | 13,637 | 22.5 |
| Total votes | | 60,688 | 100.0 |

=== Democratic primary ===
No Democrats filed.

=== Libertarian primary ===
==== Candidates ====
===== Nominee =====
- John Deek

=== Green primary ===
==== Candidates ====
===== Nominee =====
- Keith Houston

=== General election ===
==== Predictions ====
| Source | Ranking | As of |
|---|---|---|
| The Cook Political Report | Safe R | November 5, 2012 |
| Rothenberg | Safe R | November 2, 2012 |
| Roll Call | Safe R | November 4, 2012 |
| Sabato's Crystal Ball | Safe R | November 5, 2012 |
| NY Times | Safe R | November 4, 2012 |
| RCP | Safe R | November 4, 2012 |
| The Hill | Safe R | November 4, 2012 |

==== Results ====
Texas 13th congressional district, 2012
| Party | Candidate | Votes | % |
|---|---|---|---|
| Republican | Mac Thornberry (incumbent) | 187,775 | 90.98 |
| Libertarian | John Robert Deek | 12,701 | 6.15 |
| Green | Keith F. Houston | 5,912 | 2.86 |
| Total votes | | 206,388 | 100.0 |
| Republican hold | | | |

== District 14 ==
2012 Texas's 14th congressional district election
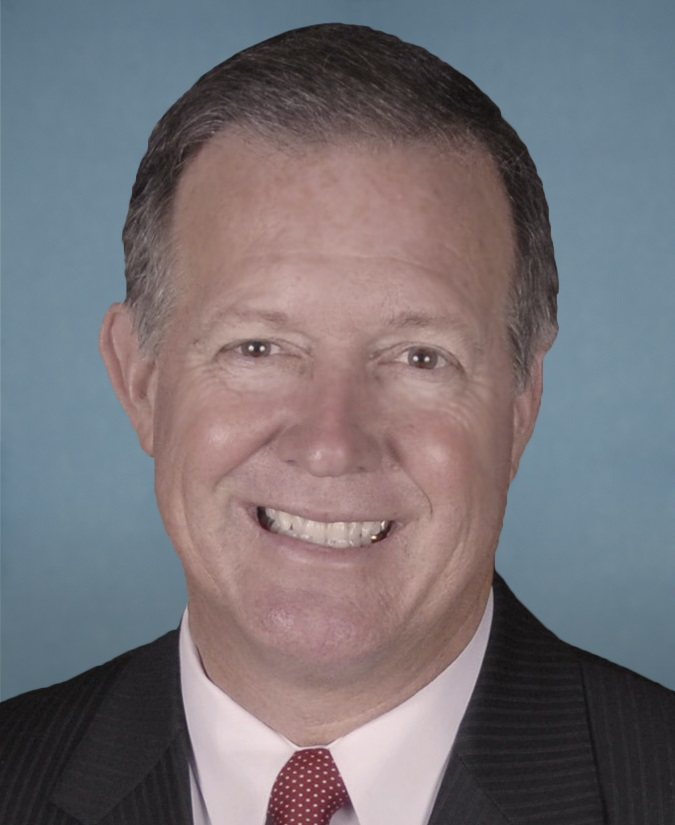

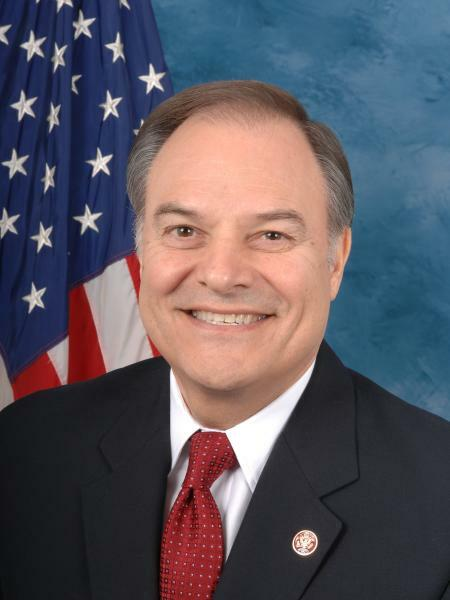
| Nominee | Randy Weber | Nick Lampson |
| Party | Republican | Democratic |
| Popular vote | 131,460 | 109,697 |
| Percentage | 53.5% | 44.6% |
- County results Weber: 50–60% 60–70% Lampson: 50–60% No Votes
U.S. Representative before election
Ron Paul
Republican
Elected U.S. Representative
Randy Weber
Republican

Republican Ron Paul, who had represented Texas's 14th congressional district since 1997 and ran for the Republican 2012 presidential nomination, did not seek re-election to the House of Representatives.

=== Republican primary ===
==== Candidates ====
===== Nominee =====
- Randy Weber, state representative

===== Eliminated in primary =====
- Tim Day, retired businessman and filmmaker
- John Gay, former Spring Independent School District administrator
- Robert Gonzalez, chair of the Clear Lake Tea Party
- George Harper, Tea Party activist and civil designer in the petro-chemical industry
- Felicia Harris, Pearland City Councilmember
- Mark Mansius, engineer
- Jay Old, attorney
- Michael J. Truncale, attorney and regent of the Texas State University System

===== Withdrawn =====
- John Faulk
- Paul Hawes

===== Declined =====
- Dennis Bonnen, state representative
- John Manlove, former mayor of Pasadena
- Debra Medina, political activist and candidate for Governor in 2010
- Steve Stockman, former U.S. Representative (running in the 36th)
- Larry Taylor, state representative

==== Endorsements ====
Felicia Harris

Organizations

- Susan B. Anthony List

==== Results ====
Texas's 14th congressional district – Republican primary, 2012
| Party | Candidate | Votes | % |
|---|---|---|---|
| Republican | Randy Weber | 12,088 | 27.60 |
| Republican | Felicia Harris | 8,287 | 18.92 |
| Republican | Michael J. Truncale | 6,212 | 14.18 |
| Republican | Jay Old | 6,143 | 14.02 |
| Republican | Robert Gonzalez | 4,302 | 9.82 |
| Republican | Bill Sargent | 3,328 | 7.60 |
| Republican | John Gay | 2,075 | 4.74 |
| Republican | George Harper | 813 | 1.86 |
| Republican | Mark A. Mansius | 554 | 1.26 |
| Total votes | | 43,802 | 100.00 |
| Plurality | | 3,801 | 8.68 |
Runoff election
| Republican | Randy Weber | 23,212 | 62.77 |
| Republican | Felicia Harris | 13,765 | 37.23 |
| Total votes | | 36,977 | 100.00 |
| Majority | | 9,447 | 25.54 |

=== Democratic primary ===
==== Candidates ====
===== Nominee =====
- Nick Lampson, former U.S. Representative

===== Eliminated in primary =====
- Linda Dailey, veteran

===== Declined =====
- Joe Jaworski, Mayor of Galveston

==== Results ====
Democratic Party primary results
| Party | Candidate | Votes | % |
|---|---|---|---|
| Democratic | Nick Lampson | 18,500 | 83.2 |
| Democratic | Linda Dailey | 3,724 | 16.8 |
| Total votes | | 22,224 | 100.0 |

=== Libertarian primary ===
==== Candidates ====
===== Nominee =====
- Zach Grady

===== Eliminated in primary =====
- Eugene Flynn, lawyer
- Amy Jacobellis, real estate agent
- Bob Smither, engineering consultant

=== Green primary ===
==== Candidates ====
===== Nominee =====
- Rhett Rosenquest Smith

=== General election ===
==== Endorsements ====
Randy Weber (R)

Organizations

- National Republican Congressional Committee "Young Guns" Program
Nick Lampson (D)

Organizations

- Blue Dog Coalition
- Democratic Congressional Campaign Committee "Red to Blue" Program

Newspapers

- Houston Chronicle

==== Polling ====
| Poll source | Date(s) administered | Sample size | Margin of error | Randy Weber (R) | Nick Lampson (D) | Undecided |
|---|---|---|---|---|---|---|
| Anzalone-Liszt (D-Lampson) | August 14–19, 2012 | 500 (LV) | ± 4.4% | 46% | 43% | 11% |
| Anzalone-Liszt (D-Lampson) | May 14–17, 2012 | 502 (LV) | ± 4.4% | 40% | 44% | 16% |

==== Predictions ====
| Source | Ranking | As of |
|---|---|---|
| The Cook Political Report | Lean R | November 5, 2012 |
| Rothenberg | Lean R | November 2, 2012 |
| Roll Call | Lean R | November 4, 2012 |
| Sabato's Crystal Ball | Likely R | November 5, 2012 |
| NY Times | Safe R | November 4, 2012 |
| RCP | Lean R | November 4, 2012 |
| The Hill | Lean R | November 4, 2012 |

==== Results ====
Texas 14th congressional district, 2012
| Party | Candidate | Votes | % |
|---|---|---|---|
| Republican | Randy Weber | 131,460 | 53.47 |
| Democratic | Nick Lampson | 109,697 | 44.62 |
| Libertarian | Zach Grady | 3,619 | 1.47 |
| Green | Rhett Rosenquest Smith | 1,063 | 0.43 |
| Total votes | | 245,839 | 100.0 |
| Republican hold | | | |

== District 15 ==
2012 Texas's 15th congressional district election

| Nominee | Rubén Hinojosa | Dale Brueggemann |
| Party | Democratic | Republican |
| Popular vote | 89,296 | 54,056 |
| Percentage | 60.9% | 36.9% |
- County results Brueggemann: 50–60% 60–70% 70–80% Hinojosa: 70–80% 80–90%
U.S. Representative before election
Rubén Hinojosa
Democratic
Elected U.S. Representative
Rubén Hinojosa
Democratic

Democrat Rubén Hinojosa, who had represented Texas's 15th congressional district since 1997, ran for re-election.

=== Democratic primary ===
==== Candidates ====
===== Nominee =====
- Rubén Hinojosa, incumbent U.S. Representative

===== Eliminated in primary =====
- David Cantu, farmer and rancher
- Jane Cross, businesswoman
- Johnny Partain
- Ruben Ramirez, attorney and educator

==== Results ====
Democratic Party primary results
| Party | Candidate | Votes | % |
|---|---|---|---|
| Democratic | Rubén Hinojosa (incumbent) | 29,397 | 71.2 |
| Democratic | David Cantu | 5,008 | 12.1 |
| Democratic | Jane Cross | 4,208 | 10.2 |
| Democratic | Ruben Ramon Ramirez | 2,012 | 4.9 |
| Democratic | Johnny Partain | 687 | 1.7 |
| Total votes | | 41,312 | 100.0 |

=== Republican primary ===
==== Candidates ====
===== Nominee =====
- Dale Brueggemann, businessman

===== Eliminated in primary =====
- Rebecca Cervera
- Jim Kuiken, Marine Corps veteran
- Eddie Zamora, sales consultant

==== Results ====
Republican Party primary results
| Party | Candidate | Votes | % |
|---|---|---|---|
| Republican | Eddie Zamora | 4,749 | 33.1 |
| Republican | Dale Brueggemann | 4,551 | 31.7 |
| Republican | Rebecca Cervera | 2,942 | 20.5 |
| Republican | Jim Kuiken | 2,124 | 14.8 |
| Total votes | | 14,366 | 100.0 |
Runoff election
| Republican | Dale Brueggemann | 6,403 | 57.3 |
| Republican | Eddie Zamora | 4,771 | 42.7 |
| Total votes | | 11,174 | 100.0 |

=== Libertarian primary ===
==== Candidates ====
===== Nominee =====
- Ron Finch

=== General election ===
==== Forum ====
2012 Texas's 15th congressional district candidate forum
| No. | Date | Host | Moderator | Link | Democratic | Republican |
| Key: P Participant A Absent N Not invited I Invited W Withdrawn | | | | | | |
| Key: P Participant A Absent N Not invited I Invited W Withdrawn | | | | | Rubén Hinojosa | Dale Brueggemann |
|---|---|---|---|---|---|---|
| 1 | Oct. 23, 2012 | KURV; KVEO-TV; Rio Grande Guardian | Sergio Sanchez; Steve Taylor; Ryan Wolf | (Note: Video contains both debates. The 34th district debate starts at 31:04) | P | P |

==== Predictions ====
| Source | Ranking | As of |
|---|---|---|
| The Cook Political Report | Safe D | November 5, 2012 |
| Rothenberg | Safe D | November 2, 2012 |
| Roll Call | Safe D | November 4, 2012 |
| Sabato's Crystal Ball | Safe D | November 5, 2012 |
| NY Times | Safe D | November 4, 2012 |
| RCP | Safe D | November 4, 2012 |
| The Hill | Safe D | November 4, 2012 |

==== Results ====
Texas 15th congressional district, 2012
| Party | Candidate | Votes | % |
|---|---|---|---|
| Democratic | Rubén Hinojosa (incumbent) | 89,296 | 60.89 |
| Republican | Dale Brueggemann | 54,056 | 36.86 |
| Libertarian | Ron Finch | 3,309 | 2.26 |
| Total votes | | 146,661 | 100.0 |
| Democratic hold | | | |

== District 16 ==
2012 Texas's 16th congressional district election
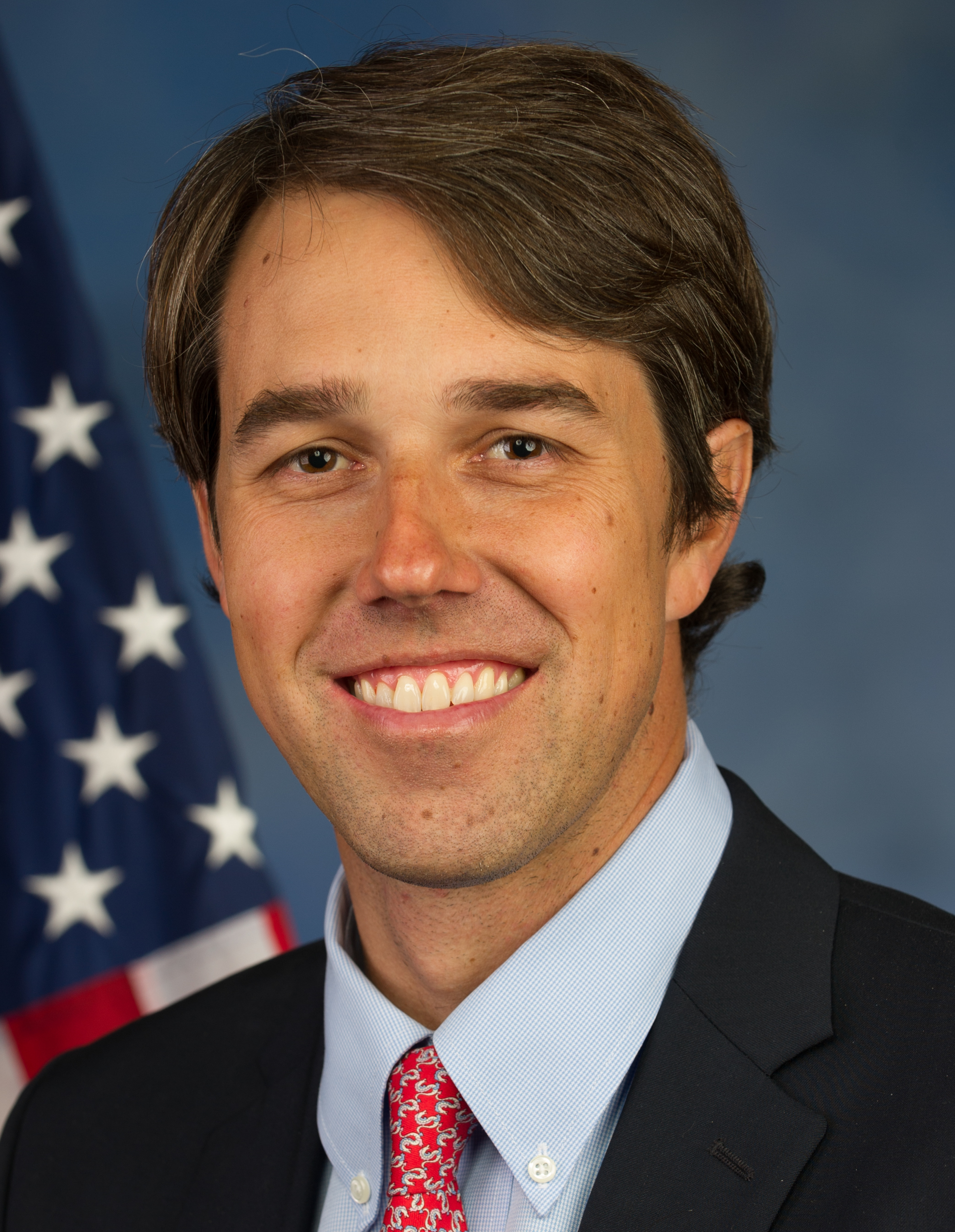

| Nominee | Beto O'Rourke | Barbara Carrasco |
| Party | Democratic | Republican |
| Popular vote | 101,403 | 51,043 |
| Percentage | 65.4% | 32.9% |
- County results O'rourke: 60–70%
U.S. Representative before election
Silvestre Reyes
Democratic
Elected U.S. Representative
Beto O'Rourke
Democratic

Democrat Silvestre Reyes, who had represented Texas's 16th congressional district since 1997, ran for re-election.

=== Democratic primary ===
==== Candidates ====
===== Nominee =====
- Beto O'Rourke, former El Paso city council member

===== Eliminated in primary =====
- Paul Johnson Jr.
- Ben Mendoza
- Silvestre Reyes, incumbent U.S. Representative
- Jerome Tilghman

==== Results ====
Democratic primary results
| Party | Candidate | Votes | % |
|---|---|---|---|
| Democratic | Beto O'Rourke | 23,261 | 50.5 |
| Democratic | Silvestre Reyes (incumbent) | 20,440 | 44.4 |
| Democratic | Jerome Tilghman | 1,270 | 2.8 |
| Democratic | Ben E. (Buddy) Mendoza | 701 | 1.5 |
| Democratic | Paul Johnson, Jr. | 419 | 0.9 |
| Total votes | | 46,091 | 100.0 |

=== Republican primary ===
==== Candidates ====
===== Nominee =====
- Barbara Carrasco, small business owner

===== Eliminated in primary =====
- Corey Dean Roen, Army lieutenant colonel and business owner

==== Results ====
Republican Party primary results
| Party | Candidate | Votes | % |
|---|---|---|---|
| Republican | Barbara Carrasco | 5,268 | 58.9 |
| Republican | Corey Dean Roen | 3,681 | 41.1 |
| Total votes | | 8,949 | 100.0 |

=== Libertarian primary ===
==== Candidates ====
===== Nominee =====
- Junart Sodoy

=== General election ===
==== Predictions ====
| Source | Ranking | As of |
|---|---|---|
| The Cook Political Report | Safe D | November 5, 2012 |
| Rothenberg | Safe D | November 2, 2012 |
| Roll Call | Safe D | November 4, 2012 |
| Sabato's Crystal Ball | Safe D | November 5, 2012 |
| NY Times | Safe D | November 4, 2012 |
| RCP | Safe D | November 4, 2012 |
| The Hill | Safe D | November 4, 2012 |

==== Results ====
Texas 16th congressional district, 2012
| Party | Candidate | Votes | % |
|---|---|---|---|
| Democratic | Beto O'Rourke | 101,403 | 65.42 |
| Republican | Barbara Carrasco | 51,043 | 32.93 |
| Libertarian | Junart Sodoy | 2,559 | 1.65 |
| Total votes | | 155,005 | 100.0 |
| Democratic hold | | | |

== District 17 ==
2012 Texas's 17th congressional district election
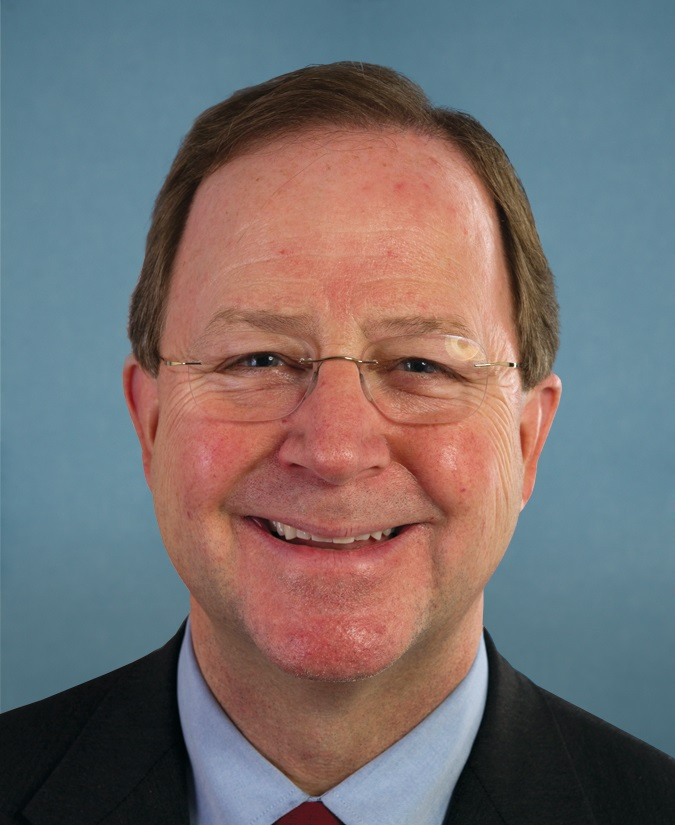

| Nominee | Bill Flores | Ben Easton |
| Party | Republican | Libertarian |
| Popular vote | 143,284 | 35,978 |
| Percentage | 79.9% | 20.1% |
- County results Flores: 50–60% 70–80% 80–90% >90%
U.S. Representative before election
Bill Flores
Republican
Elected U.S. Representative
Bill Flores
Republican

Republican Bill Flores, who was elected to represent Texas's 17th congressional district in 2010, ran for reelection.

=== Republican primary ===
==== Candidates ====
===== Nominee =====
- Bill Flores, incumbent U.S. Representative

===== Eliminated in primary =====
- George Hindman, business owner

==== Results ====
Republican Party primary results
| Party | Candidate | Votes | % |
|---|---|---|---|
| Republican | Bill Flores (incumbent) | 41,449 | 82.5 |
| Republican | George W. Hindman | 8,790 | 17.5 |
| Total votes | | 50,239 | 100.0 |

=== Democratic primary ===
No Democrats filed.

=== Libertarian primary ===
==== Candidates ====
===== Nominee =====
- Ben Easton, former teacher and freelance author

=== General election ===
==== Endorsements ====
Ben Easton (L)

Newspapers

- The Austin Chronicle

==== Predictions ====
| Source | Ranking | As of |
|---|---|---|
| The Cook Political Report | Safe R | November 5, 2012 |
| Rothenberg | Safe R | November 2, 2012 |
| Roll Call | Safe R | November 4, 2012 |
| Sabato's Crystal Ball | Safe R | November 5, 2012 |
| NY Times | Safe R | November 4, 2012 |
| RCP | Safe R | November 4, 2012 |
| The Hill | Safe R | November 4, 2012 |

==== Results ====
Texas 17th congressional district, 2012
| Party | Candidate | Votes | % |
|---|---|---|---|
| Republican | Bill Flores (incumbent) | 143,284 | 79.93 |
| Libertarian | Ben Easton | 35,978 | 20.07 |
| Total votes | | 179,262 | 100.0 |
| Republican hold | | | |

== District 18 ==
2012 Texas's 18th congressional district election
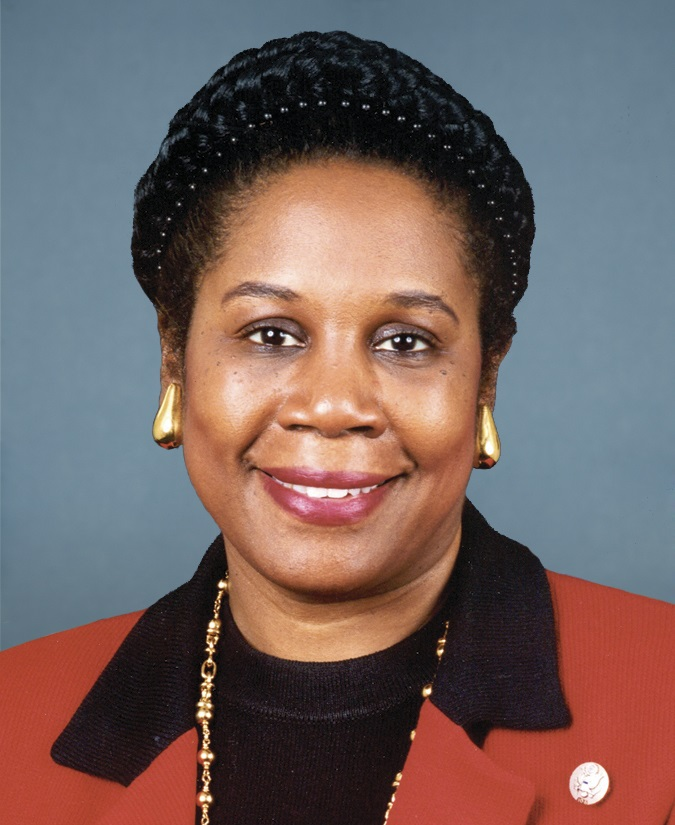

| Nominee | Sheila Jackson Lee | Sean Seibert |
| Party | Democratic | Republican |
| Popular vote | 146,223 | 44,015 |
| Percentage | 75.0% | 22.6% |
- County results Lee: 70–80%
U.S. Representative before election
Sheila Jackson Lee
Democratic
Elected U.S. Representative
Sheila Jackson Lee
Democratic

Democrat Sheila Jackson Lee, who had represented Texas's 18th congressional district since 1995, ran for reelection.

=== Democratic primary ===
==== Candidates ====
===== Nominee =====
- Sheila Jackson Lee, incumbent U.S. Representative

==== Results ====
Democratic Party primary results
| Party | Candidate | Votes | % |
|---|---|---|---|
| Democratic | Sheila Jackson Lee (incumbent) | 21,171 | 100.0 |
| Total votes | | 21,171 | 100.0 |

=== Republican primary ===
==== Candidates ====
===== Nominee =====
- Sean Seibert, Afghanistan veteran

==== Results ====
Republican Party primary results
| Party | Candidate | Votes | % |
|---|---|---|---|
| Republican | Sean Seibert | 7,493 | 100.0 |
| Total votes | | 7,493 | 100.0 |

=== Libertarian primary ===
==== Candidates ====
===== Nominee =====
- Christopher Barber

=== General election ===
==== Endorsements ====
Sean Seibert (R)

Organizations

- National Republican Congressional Committee "On the Radar" Program

==== Predictions ====
| Source | Ranking | As of |
|---|---|---|
| The Cook Political Report | Safe D | November 5, 2012 |
| Rothenberg | Safe D | November 2, 2012 |
| Roll Call | Safe D | November 4, 2012 |
| Sabato's Crystal Ball | Safe D | November 5, 2012 |
| NY Times | Safe D | November 4, 2012 |
| RCP | Safe D | November 4, 2012 |
| The Hill | Safe D | November 4, 2012 |

==== Results ====
Texas 18th congressional district, 2012
| Party | Candidate | Votes | % |
|---|---|---|---|
| Democratic | Sheila Jackson Lee (incumbent) | 146,223 | 75.01 |
| Republican | Sean Seibert | 44,015 | 22.58 |
| Libertarian | Christopher Barber | 4,694 | 2.41 |
| Total votes | | 194,932 | 100.0 |
| Democratic hold | | | |

== District 19 ==
2012 Texas's 19th congressional district election
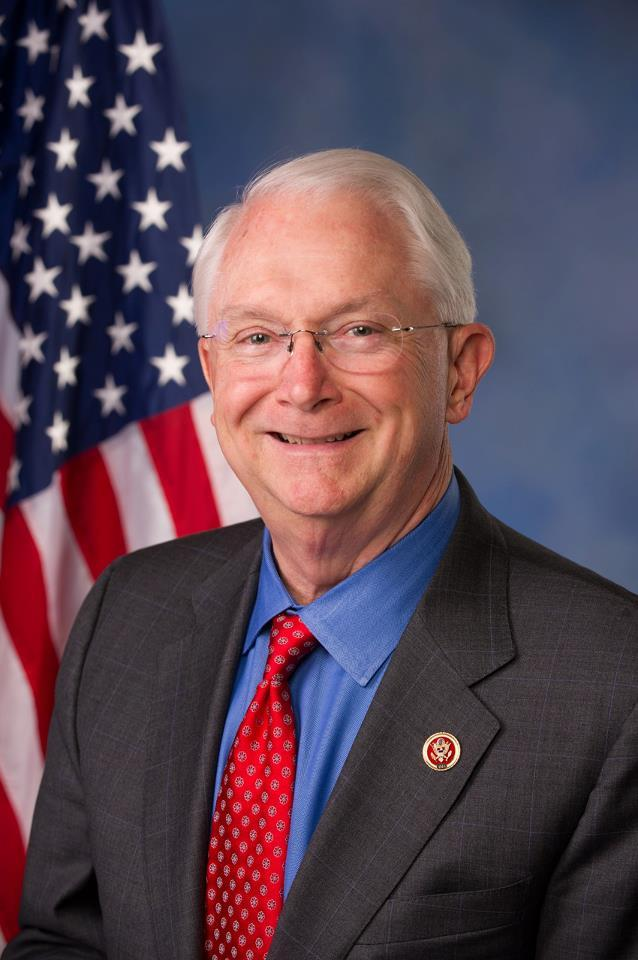

| Nominee | Randy Neugebauer | Richard (Chip) Peterson |
| Party | Republican | Libertarian |
| Popular vote | 163,239 | 28,824 |
| Percentage | 85.0% | 15.0% |
- County results Neugebauer: 80–90% 90–100%
U.S. Representative before election
Randy Neugebauer
Republican
Elected U.S. Representative
Randy Neugebauer
Republican

Republican Randy Neugebauer, who had represented Texas's 19th congressional district since 2003, ran for reelection.

=== Republican primary ===
Neugebauer, considered perhaps the most conservative of all House members, faced opposition in his primary from Chris Winn, the former Lubbock County GOP chairman.

==== Candidates ====
===== Nominee =====
- Randy Neugebauer, incumbent U.S. Representative

===== Eliminated in primary =====
- Chris Winn, former chair of Lubbock County Republican Party

==== Results ====
Republican Party primary results
| Party | Candidate | Votes | % |
|---|---|---|---|
| Republican | Randy Neugebauer (incumbent) | 45,444 | 74.3 |
| Republican | Chris Winn | 15,707 | 25.7 |
| Total votes | | 61,151 | 100.0 |

=== Libertarian primary ===
==== Candidates ====
===== Nominee =====
- Richard Peterson, professor emeritus at Texas Tech University

=== General election ===
==== Predictions ====
| Source | Ranking | As of |
|---|---|---|
| The Cook Political Report | Safe R | November 5, 2012 |
| Rothenberg | Safe R | November 2, 2012 |
| Roll Call | Safe R | November 4, 2012 |
| Sabato's Crystal Ball | Safe R | November 5, 2012 |
| NY Times | Safe R | November 4, 2012 |
| RCP | Safe R | November 4, 2012 |
| The Hill | Safe R | November 4, 2012 |

==== Results ====
Texas 19th congressional district, 2012
| Party | Candidate | Votes | % |
|---|---|---|---|
| Republican | Randy Neugebauer (incumbent) | 163,239 | 84.99 |
| Libertarian | Richard (Chip) Peterson | 28,824 | 15.01 |
| Total votes | | 192,063 | 100.0 |
| Republican hold | | | |

== District 20 ==
2012 Texas's 20th congressional district election
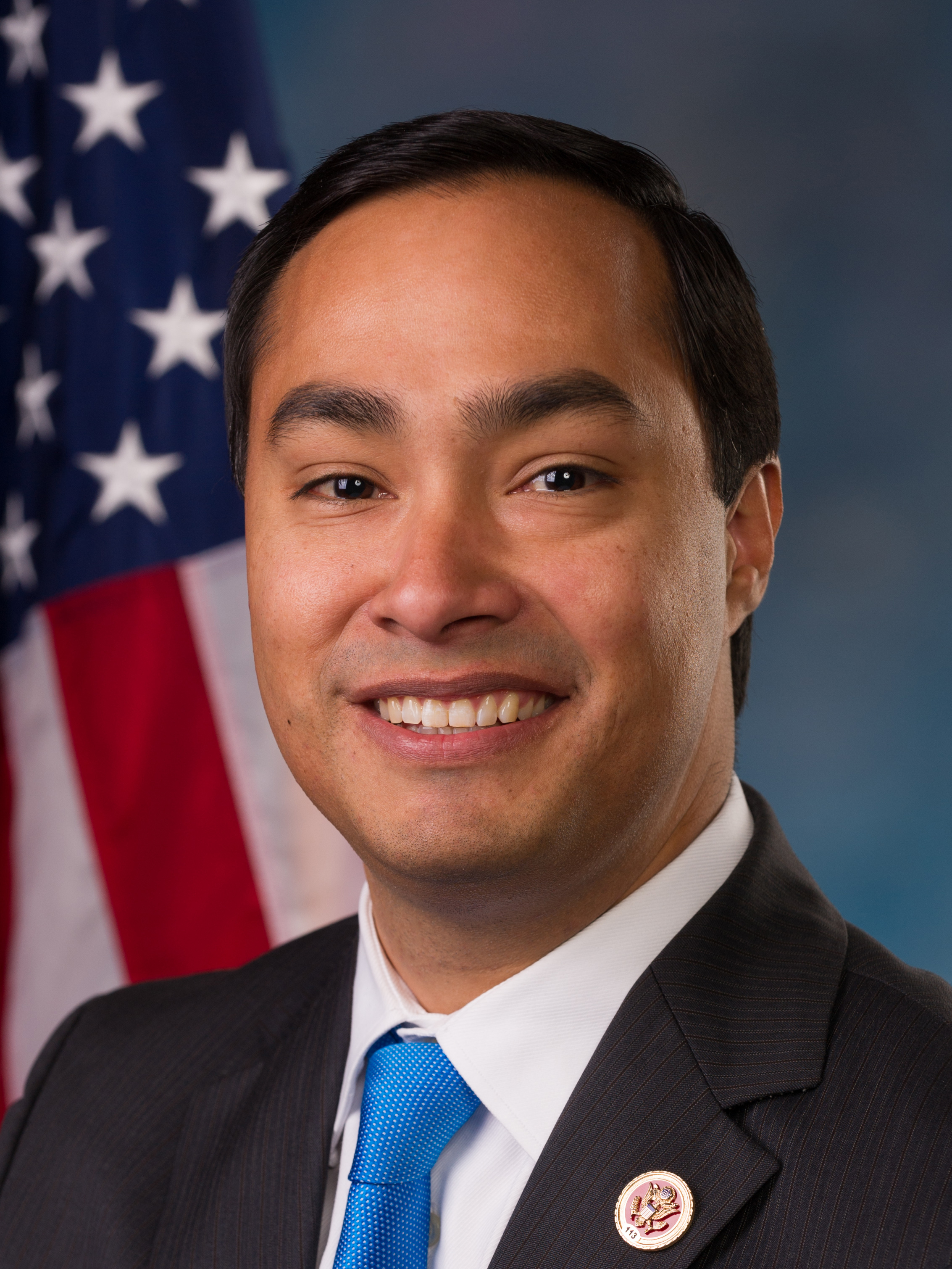

| Nominee | Joaquín Castro | David Rosa |
| Party | Democratic | Republican |
| Popular vote | 119,032 | 62,376 |
| Percentage | 63.9% | 33.5% |
- County results Castro: 60–70%
U.S. Representative before election
Charlie Gonzalez
Democratic
Elected U.S. Representative
Joaquín Castro
Democratic

Democrat Charlie Gonzalez, who had represented Texas's 20th congressional district since 1999, retired rather than run for re-election.

=== Democratic primary ===
==== Candidates ====
===== Nominee =====
- Joaquín Castro, state representative

===== Withdrawn =====
- Ezra Johnson, attorney

===== Declined =====
- Charlie Gonzalez, incumbent U.S. Representative

==== Results ====
Democratic Party primary results
| Party | Candidate | Votes | % |
|---|---|---|---|
| Democratic | Joaquín Castro | 16,562 | 100.0 |
| Total votes | | 16,562 | 100.0 |

=== Republican primary ===
==== Candidates ====
===== Nominee =====
- David Rosa, independent insurance agent

==== Results ====
Republican Party primary results
| Party | Candidate | Votes | % |
|---|---|---|---|
| Republican | David Rosa | 9,582 | 100.0 |
| Total votes | | 9,582 | 100.0 |

=== Libertarian primary ===
==== Candidates ====
===== Nominee =====
- A. E. Potts

=== Green primary ===
==== Candidates ====
===== Nominee =====
- Antonio Diaz, small business owner

=== General election ===
==== Endorsements ====
Joaquín Castro (D)

Organizations

- Democratic Congressional Campaign Committee "Majority Makers" Program

==== Predictions ====
| Source | Ranking | As of |
|---|---|---|
| The Cook Political Report | Safe D | November 5, 2012 |
| Rothenberg | Safe D | November 2, 2012 |
| Roll Call | Safe D | November 4, 2012 |
| Sabato's Crystal Ball | Safe D | November 5, 2012 |
| NY Times | Safe D | November 4, 2012 |
| RCP | Safe D | November 4, 2012 |
| The Hill | Safe D | November 4, 2012 |

==== Results ====
Texas 20th congressional district, 2012
| Party | Candidate | Votes | % |
|---|---|---|---|
| Democratic | Joaquín Castro | 119,032 | 63.93 |
| Republican | David Rosa | 62,376 | 33.50 |
| Libertarian | A. E. (Tracy) Potts | 3,143 | 1.69 |
| Green | Antonio Diaz | 1,626 | 0.87 |
| Total votes | | 186,177 | 100.0 |
| Democratic hold | | | |

== District 21 ==
2012 Texas's 21st congressional district election
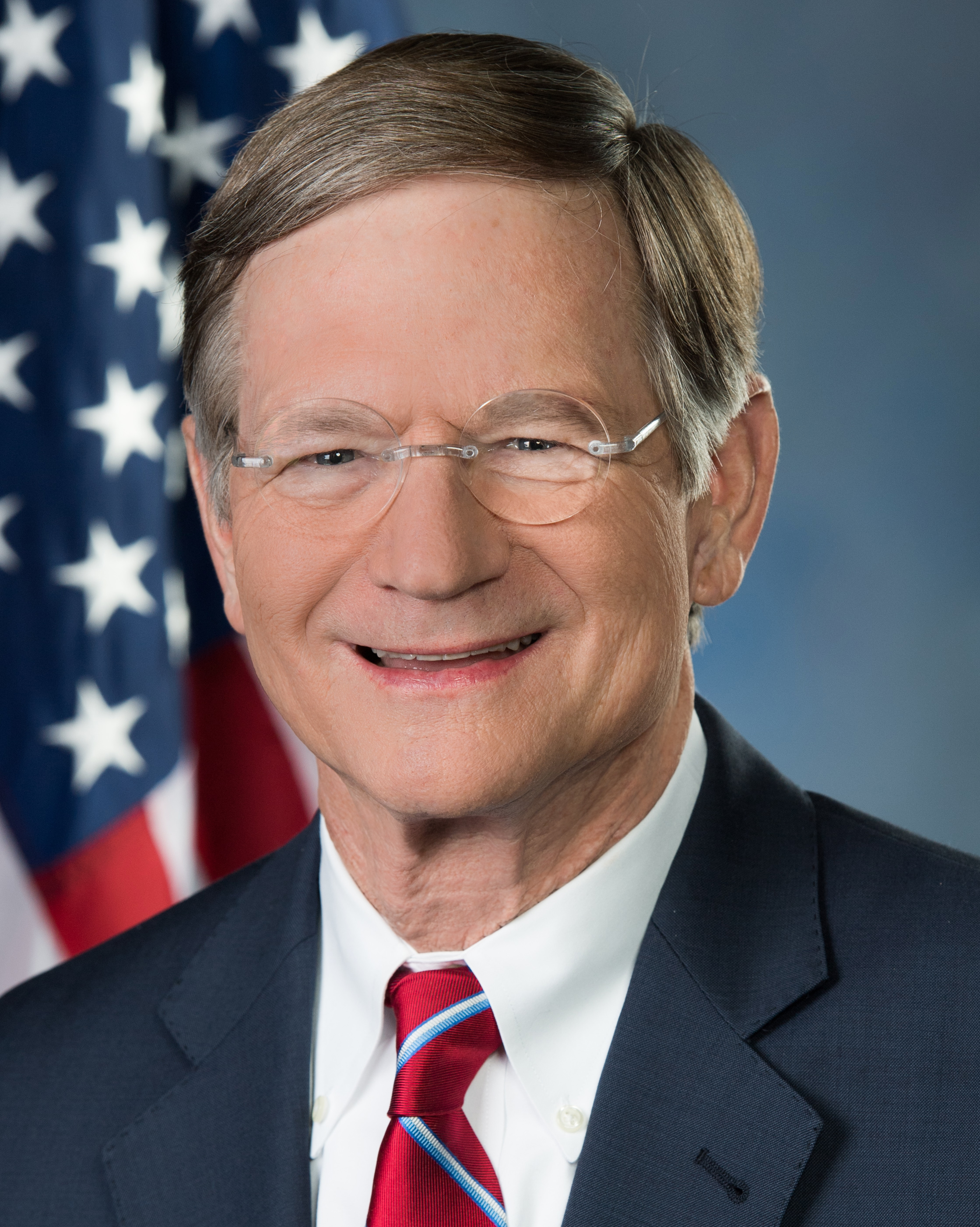

| Nominee | Lamar Smith | Candace Duvál |
| Party | Republican | Democratic |
| Popular vote | 187,015 | 109,326 |
| Percentage | 60.5% | 35.4% |
- County results Smith: 50–60% 60–70% 70–80% 80–90% Duval: 60–70%
U.S. Representative before election
Lamar Smith
Republican
Elected U.S. Representative
Lamar Smith
Republican

Republican Lamar Smith, who had represented Texas's 21st congressional district since 1987, ran for re-election.

=== Republican primary ===
==== Candidates ====
===== Nominee =====
- Lamar Smith, incumbent U.S. Representative

===== Eliminated in primary =====
- Richard Mack, former sheriff of Graham County, Arizona
- Richard Morgan, software developer

==== Results ====
Republican Party primary results
| Party | Candidate | Votes | % |
|---|---|---|---|
| Republican | Lamar Smith (incumbent) | 52,404 | 76.6 |
| Republican | Richard Mack | 10,111 | 14.8 |
| Republican | Richard Morgan | 5,868 | 8.6 |
| Total votes | | 68,383 | 100.0 |

=== Democratic primary ===
==== Candidates ====
===== Nominee =====
- Candace Duvál, business owner

===== Eliminated in primary =====
- Daniel Boone, small business owner

==== Results ====
Democratic Party primary results
| Party | Candidate | Votes | % |
|---|---|---|---|
| Democratic | Candace Duvál | 9,522 | 61.1 |
| Democratic | Daniel Boone | 6,070 | 38.9 |
| Total votes | | 15,592 | 100.0 |

=== Libertarian primary ===
==== Candidates ====
===== Nominee =====
- John-Henry Liberty

=== Green primary ===
==== Candidates ====
===== Withdrawn =====
- Fidel Castillo
- Bill Stout

=== General election ===
==== Endorsements ====
Candace Duvál (D)

Newspapers

- The Austin Chronicle

==== Predictions ====
| Source | Ranking | As of |
|---|---|---|
| The Cook Political Report | Safe R | November 5, 2012 |
| Rothenberg | Safe R | November 2, 2012 |
| Roll Call | Safe R | November 4, 2012 |
| Sabato's Crystal Ball | Safe R | November 5, 2012 |
| NY Times | Safe R | November 4, 2012 |
| RCP | Safe R | November 4, 2012 |
| The Hill | Safe R | November 4, 2012 |

==== Results ====
Texas 21st congressional district, 2012
| Party | Candidate | Votes | % |
|---|---|---|---|
| Republican | Lamar Smith (incumbent) | 187,015 | 60.55 |
| Democratic | Candace Duvál | 109,326 | 35.40 |
| Libertarian | John-Henry Liberty | 12,524 | 4.05 |
| Total votes | | 308,865 | 100.0 |
| Republican hold | | | |

== District 22 ==
2012 Texas's 22nd congressional district election
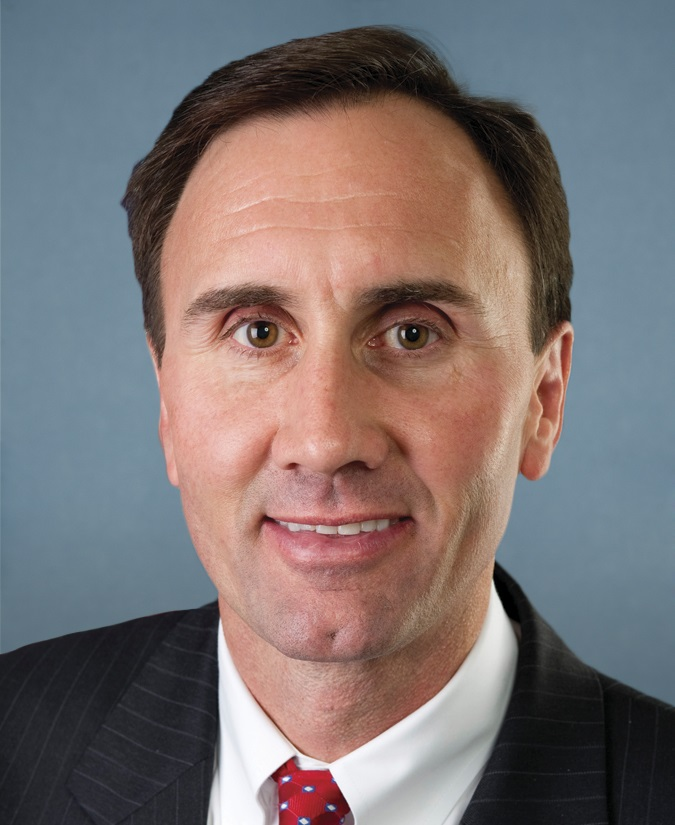

| Nominee | Pete Olson | Kesha Rogers |
| Party | Republican | Democratic |
| Popular vote | 160,668 | 80,203 |
| Percentage | 68.9% | 31.1% |
- County results Olson: 50–60% 60–70%
U.S. Representative before election
Pete Olson
Republican
Elected U.S. Representative
Pete Olson
Republican

Republican incumbent Pete Olson, who had represented Texas's 22nd congressional district since 2009, ran for re-election.

=== Republican primary ===
==== Candidates ====
===== Nominee =====
- Pete Olson, incumbent U.S. Representative

===== Eliminated in primary =====
- Barbara Carlson, conservative newspaper columnist

==== Results ====
Republican Party primary results
| Party | Candidate | Votes | % |
|---|---|---|---|
| Republican | Pete Olson (incumbent) | 35,838 | 76.5 |
| Republican | Barbara Carlson | 11,019 | 23.5 |
| Total votes | | 46,857 | 100.0 |

=== Democratic primary ===
==== Candidates ====
===== Nominee =====
- Kesha Rogers, LaRouche movement activist and nominee for this seat in 2010

===== Eliminated in primary =====
- KP George, financial planner

===== Withdrawn =====
- Doug Blatt, candidate for this seat in 2010

==== Results ====
Democratic Party primary results
| Party | Candidate | Votes | % |
|---|---|---|---|
| Democratic | Kesha Rogers | 3,666 | 50.7 |
| Democratic | KP George | 3,563 | 49.3 |
| Total votes | | 7,229 | 100.0 |

=== Libertarian primary ===
- Steven Susman

=== Green primary ===
- Don Cook

=== General election ===
==== Campaign ====
Rogers was disavowed by some local Democrats for her controversial platform, which included impeaching President Obama and colonizing outer space. She was frequently seen on the campaign trail singing, "Twenty-fifth Amendment now--he is nuts! Obama is nuts!" referring to LaRouche's call to have Obama removed from office on the grounds of insanity.

==== Predictions ====
| Source | Ranking | As of |
|---|---|---|
| The Cook Political Report | Safe R | November 5, 2012 |
| Rothenberg | Safe R | November 2, 2012 |
| Roll Call | Safe R | November 4, 2012 |
| Sabato's Crystal Ball | Safe R | November 5, 2012 |
| NY Times | Safe R | November 4, 2012 |
| RCP | Safe R | November 4, 2012 |
| The Hill | Safe R | November 4, 2012 |

==== Results ====
Texas 22nd congressional district, 2012
| Party | Candidate | Votes | % |
|---|---|---|---|
| Republican | Pete Olson (incumbent) | 160,668 | 64.03 |
| Democratic | Kesha Rogers | 80,203 | 31.96 |
| Libertarian | Steven Susman | 5,986 | 2.39 |
| Green | Don Cook | 4,054 | 1.62 |
| Total votes | | 250,911 | 100.0 |
| Republican hold | | | |

== District 23 ==
2012 Texas's 23rd congressional district election
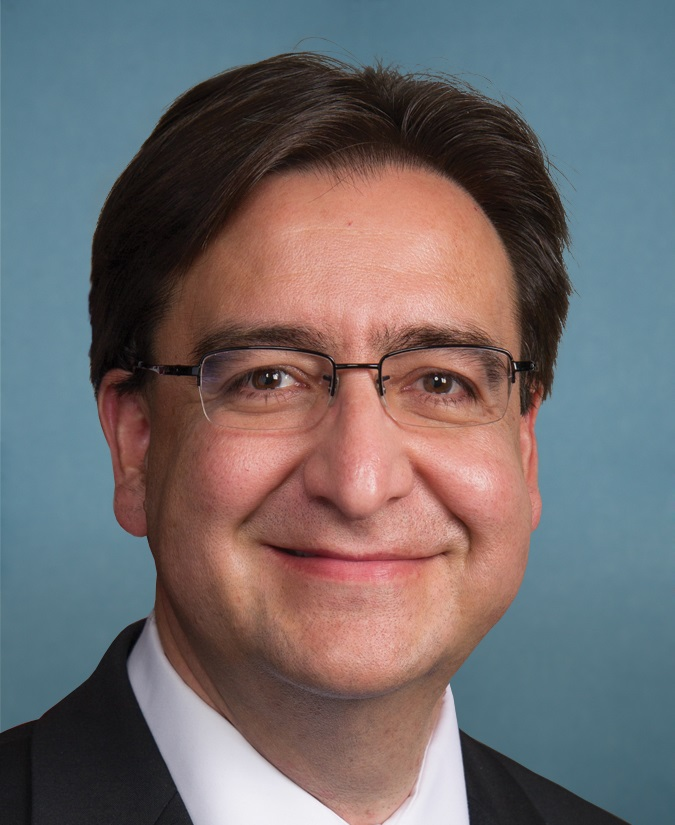

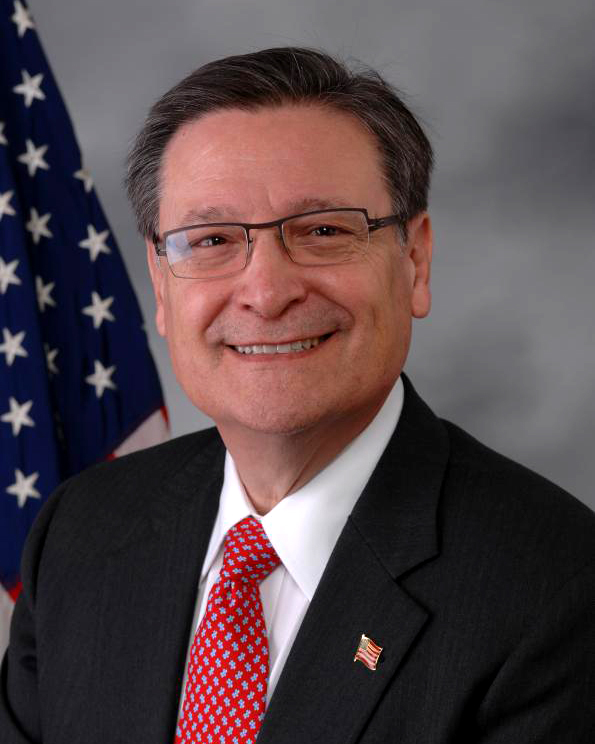
| Nominee | Pete Gallego | Quico Canseco |
| Party | Democratic | Republican |
| Popular vote | 96,676 | 87,547 |
| Percentage | 50.3% | 45.6% |
- County results Gallego: 40–50% 50–60% 60–70% 70–80% 80–90% Canseco: 50–60% 60–70% 70–80%
U.S. Representative before election
Quico Canseco
Republican
Elected U.S. Representative
Pete Gallego
Democratic

Republican Quico Canseco, who had represented Texas's 23rd congressional district since 2011, ran for re-election.

=== Republican primary ===
==== Candidates ====
===== Nominee =====
- Quico Canseco, incumbent U.S. Representative

==== Results ====
Republican Party primary results
| Party | Candidate | Votes | % |
|---|---|---|---|
| Republican | Quico Canseco (incumbent) | 17,438 | 100.0 |
| Total votes | | 17,438 | 100.0 |

=== Democratic primary ===
Former U.S. Representative Ciro Rodriguez, who represented the 23rd district from 2007 until 2011, had initially planned to seek the Democratic nomination in the 23rd district; however, in November 2011, he announced he would instead run in the new 35th district, and later said he would run in whichever district contained his home (which transpired to be the 22nd).

==== Candidates ====
===== Nominee =====
- Pete Gallego, state representative

===== Eliminated in primary =====
- John Bustamante, lawyer and the son of former U.S. Representative Albert Bustamante
- Ciro Rodriguez, former U.S. Representative

===== Declined =====
- Manny Pelaez, employment law attorney and trustee of VIA Metropolitan Transit

==== Results ====
Gallego won the primary run-off against Rodriguez.

Democratic Party primary results
| Party | Candidate | Votes | % |
|---|---|---|---|
| Democratic | Ciro Rodriguez | 18,237 | 46.0 |
| Democratic | Pete Gallego | 16,202 | 40.8 |
| Democratic | John Bustamante | 5,240 | 13.2 |
| Total votes | | 39,679 | 100.0 |
Runoff election
| Democratic | Pete Gallego | 15,815 | 54.8 |
| Democratic | Ciro Rodriguez | 13,038 | 45.2 |
| Total votes | | 28,853 | 100.0 |

=== Libertarian primary ===
==== Candidates ====
===== Nominee =====
- Jeffrey Blunt, engineer

=== Green primary ===
==== Candidates ====
===== Nominee =====
- Ed Scharf, retired federal employee

=== General election ===
==== Endorsements ====
Quico Canseco (R)

Organizations

- National Republican Congressional Committee "Patriot" Program
Pete Gallego (D)

Organizations

- Blue Dog Coalition
- Democratic Congressional Campaign Committee "Red to Blue" Program

==== Polling ====
| Poll source | Date(s) administered | Sample size | Margin of error | Quico Canseco (R) | Pete Gallego (D) | Other | Undecided |
|---|---|---|---|---|---|---|---|
| OnMessage (R-Canseco) | September 23–25, 2012 | 400 (LV) | ± 4.9% | 47% | 37% | 8% | 8% |
| Anzalone-Liszt (D-LCV)/Sierra Club) | September 12–17, 2012 | 500 (LV) | ± 4.4% | 38% | 43% | – | 19% |

==== Predictions ====
| Source | Ranking | As of |
|---|---|---|
| The Cook Political Report | Tossup | November 5, 2012 |
| Rothenberg | Tilt R | November 2, 2012 |
| Roll Call | Tossup | November 4, 2012 |
| Sabato's Crystal Ball | Lean D (flip) | November 5, 2012 |
| NY Times | Lean R | November 4, 2012 |
| RCP | Tossup | November 4, 2012 |
| The Hill | Tossup | November 4, 2012 |

==== Results ====
Texas 23rd congressional district, 2012
| Party | Candidate | Votes | % |
|---|---|---|---|
| Democratic | Pete Gallego | 96,676 | 50.31 |
| Republican | Quico Canseco (incumbent) | 87,547 | 45.56 |
| Libertarian | Jeffrey C. Blunt | 5,841 | 3.04 |
| Green | Ed Scharf | 2,105 | 1.10 |
| Total votes | | 192,169 | 100.0 |
| Democratic gain from Republican | | | |

== District 24 ==
2012 Texas's 24th congressional district election
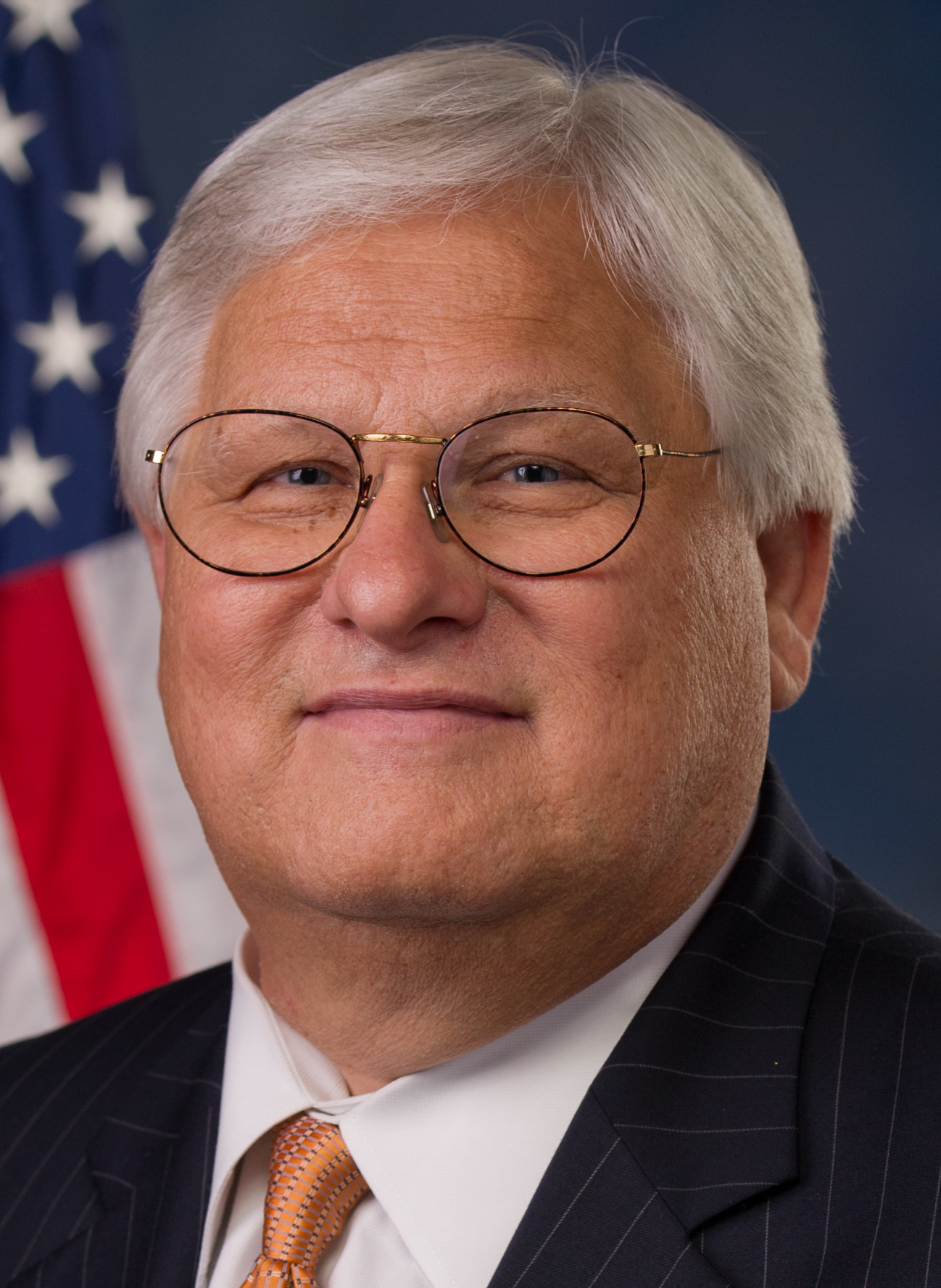

| Nominee | Kenny Marchant | Tim Rusk |
| Party | Republican | Democratic |
| Popular vote | 148,586 | 87,645 |
| Percentage | 61.0% | 36.0% |
- County results Marchant: 50–60% 60–70%
U.S. Representative before election
Kenny Marchant
Republican
Elected U.S. Representative
Kenny Marchant
Republican

Republican Kenny Marchant, who had represented Texas's 24th congressional district since 2005, ran for re-election.

=== Republican primary ===
==== Candidates ====
===== Nominee =====
- Kenny Marchant, incumbent U.S. Representative

===== Eliminated in primary =====
- Grant Stinchfield, former television reporter for KXAS-TV

==== Results ====
Republican Party primary results
| Party | Candidate | Votes | % |
|---|---|---|---|
| Republican | Kenny Marchant (incumbent) | 27,926 | 67.9 |
| Republican | Grant Stinchfield | 13,184 | 32.1 |
| Total votes | | 41,110 | 100.0 |

=== Democratic primary ===
On March 5, 2012, Patrick McGehearty, a computer scientist, dropped out of the Democratic primary to support his wife through a medical problem. McGehearty endorsed Tim Rusk, an attorney from Euless.

==== Candidates ====
===== Nominee =====
- Tim Rusk, attorney

===== Withdrawn =====
- Patrick McGehearty, computer scientist

==== Results ====
Democratic Party primary results
| Party | Candidate | Votes | % |
|---|---|---|---|
| Democratic | Tim Rusk | 5,267 | 100.0 |
| Total votes | | 5,267 | 100.0 |

=== Libertarian primary ===
==== Candidates ====
===== Nominee =====
- John Stathas

=== General election ===
==== Endorsements ====
Kenny Marchant (R)

Newspapers

- Dallas Morning News

==== Predictions ====
| Source | Ranking | As of |
|---|---|---|
| The Cook Political Report | Safe R | November 5, 2012 |
| Rothenberg | Safe R | November 2, 2012 |
| Roll Call | Safe R | November 4, 2012 |
| Sabato's Crystal Ball | Safe R | November 5, 2012 |
| NY Times | Safe R | November 4, 2012 |
| RCP | Safe R | November 4, 2012 |
| The Hill | Safe R | November 4, 2012 |

==== Results ====
Texas 24th congressional district, 2012
| Party | Candidate | Votes | % |
|---|---|---|---|
| Republican | Kenny Marchant (incumbent) | 148,586 | 61.02 |
| Democratic | Tim Rusk | 87,645 | 36.00 |
| Libertarian | John Stathas | 7,258 | 2.98 |
| Total votes | | 243,489 | 100.0 |
| Republican hold | | | |

== District 25 ==
2012 Texas's 25th congressional district election
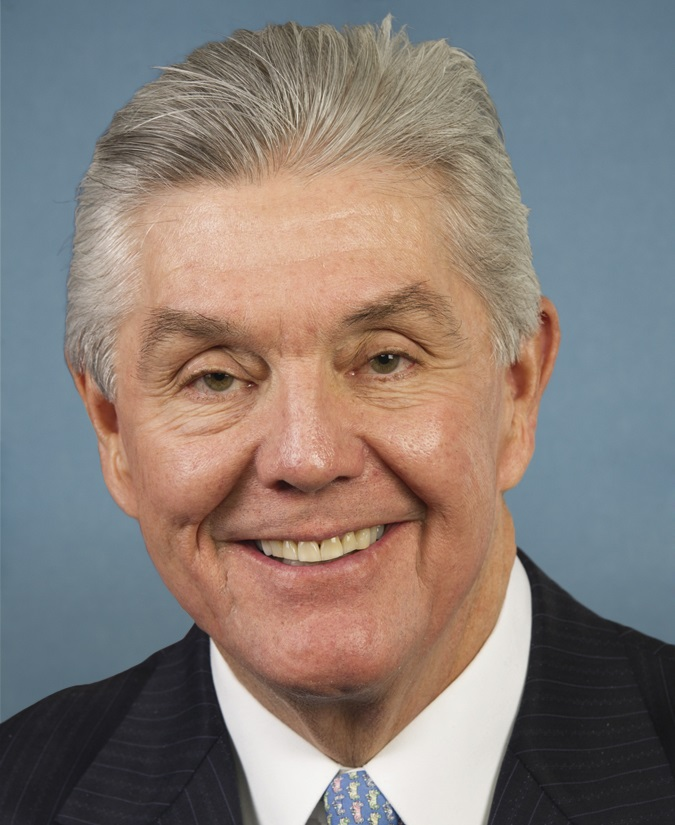

| Nominee | Roger Williams | Elaine Henderson |
| Party | Republican | Democratic |
| Popular vote | 154,245 | 98,827 |
| Percentage | 58.4% | 37.4% |
- County results Williams: 60–70% 70–80% 80–90% Henderson: 50–60% 60–70%
U.S. Representative before election
None
(new district)
Elected U.S. Representative
Roger Williams
Republican

Democrat Lloyd Doggett, who had represented Texas's 25th congressional district since 2005, had intended to seek re-election in the new 35th district; however, the November 2011 interim map would allow him to instead run in the 25th district. In the event, he ran in the 35th district, as the final version of the 25th was almost entirely a new, and much more Republican leaning seat.

=== Republican primary ===
==== Candidates ====
===== Nominee =====
- Roger Williams, former Secretary of State of Texas

===== Eliminated in primary =====
- Ernie Beltz Jr., former federal agency program manager, former business owner, and ex-marine
- Bill Burch, thead of the Grass Roots Institute of Texas
- Dianne Costa, former mayor of Highland Village
- James Dillon
- Dave Garrison, former Halliburton and USAA executive
- Justin Hewlett, Mayor of Cleburne
- Charles Holcomb, U.S. Air Force reservist
- Brian Matthews, businessman and former actor
- Wes Riddle, businessman
- Chad Wilbanks, former executive director of the Texas Republican Party;
- Michael Williams, former Railroad Commissioner

===== Withdrawn =====
- Ralph Pruyn, businessman

===== Declined =====
- Donna Campbell, ophthalmologist and nominee for this seat in 2010
- Jason Isaac, state representative
- Sid Miller, state representative

==== Results ====
Republican Party primary results
| Party | Candidate | Votes | % |
|---|---|---|---|
| Republican | Roger Williams | 12,894 | 25.1 |
| Republican | Wes Riddle | 7,481 | 14.6 |
| Republican | Justin Hewlett | 6,178 | 12.0 |
| Republican | Dave Garrison | 6,133 | 12.0 |
| Republican | Michael Williams | 5,392 | 10.5 |
| Republican | Dianne Costa | 4,810 | 9.4 |
| Republican | Brian Matthews | 1,824 | 3.6 |
| Republican | Charlie Holcomb | 1,690 | 3.3 |
| Republican | Chad Wilbanks | 1,593 | 3.1 |
| Republican | Bill Burch | 1,575 | 3.1 |
| Republican | James Dillon | 1,174 | 2.3 |
| Republican | Ernie Beltz, Jr. | 596 | 1.2 |
| Total votes | | 51,340 | 100.0 |
Runoff election
| Republican | Roger Williams | 26,495 | 58.0 |
| Republican | Wes Riddle | 19,210 | 42.0 |
| Total votes | | 45,705 | 100.0 |

=== Democratic primary ===
==== Candidates ====
===== Nominee =====
- Elaine Henderson, retired airport operations supervisor

===== Declined =====
- Lloyd Doggett, incumbent U.S. Representative (running in the 35th)

==== Results ====
Democratic Party primary results
| Party | Candidate | Votes | % |
|---|---|---|---|
| Democratic | Elaine Henderson | 13,465 | 100.0 |
| Total votes | | 13,465 | 100.0 |

=== Libertarian primary ===
==== Candidates ====
===== Nominee =====
- Betsy Dewey

=== General election ===
==== Endorsements ====
Roger Williams (R)

Organizations

- National Republican Congressional Committee "Vanguard" Program
Elaine Henderson (D)

Newspapers

- The Austin Chronicle

==== Predictions ====
| Source | Ranking | As of |
|---|---|---|
| The Cook Political Report | Safe R | November 5, 2012 |
| Rothenberg | Safe R | November 2, 2012 |
| Roll Call | Safe R | November 4, 2012 |
| Sabato's Crystal Ball | Safe R | November 5, 2012 |
| NY Times | Safe R | November 4, 2012 |
| RCP | Safe R | November 4, 2012 |
| The Hill | Safe R | November 4, 2012 |

==== Results ====
Texas 25th congressional district, 2012
| Party | Candidate | Votes | % |
|---|---|---|---|
| Republican | Roger Williams | 154,245 | 58.44 |
| Democratic | Elaine M. Henderson | 98,827 | 37.44 |
| Libertarian | Betsy Dewey | 10,860 | 4.11 |
| Total votes | | 263,932 | 100.0 |
| Republican win (new seat) | | | |

== District 26 ==
2012 Texas's 26th congressional district election
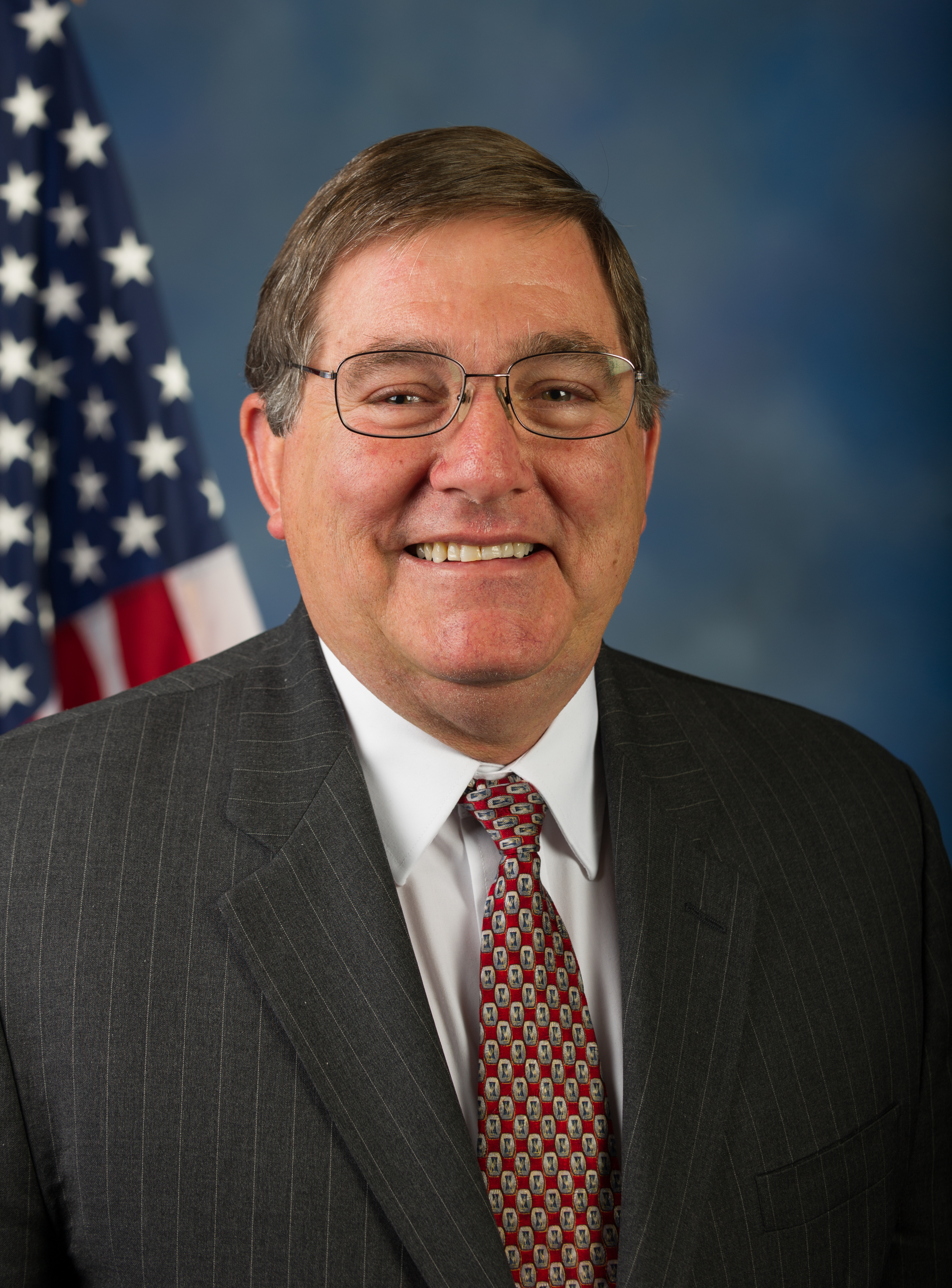

| Nominee | Michael Burgess | David Sanchez |
| Party | Republican | Democratic |
| Popular vote | 176,642 | 74,237 |
| Percentage | 68.3% | 28.7% |
- County results Burgess: 60–70% 70–80%
U.S. Representative before election
Michael Burgess
Republican
Elected U.S. Representative
Michael Burgess
Republican

Republican Michael Burgess, who had represented Texas's 26th congressional district since 2003, ran for re-election.

=== Republican primary ===
==== Candidates ====
===== Nominee =====
- Michael Burgess, incumbent U.S. Representative

==== Results ====
Republican Party primary results
| Party | Candidate | Votes | % |
|---|---|---|---|
| Republican | Michael Burgess (incumbent) | 33,605 | 100.0 |
| Total votes | | 33,605 | 100.0 |

=== Democratic primary ===
==== Candidates ====
===== Nominee =====
- David Sanchez, former Diversity Chair of the Denton County Democratic Party

==== Results ====
Democratic Party primary results
| Party | Candidate | Votes | % |
|---|---|---|---|
| Democratic | David Sanchez | 3,682 | 100.0 |
| Total votes | | 3,682 | 100.0 |

=== Libertarian primary ===
==== Candidates ====
===== Nominee =====
- Mark Boler, computer scientist

=== General election ===
==== Endorsements ====
Michael Burgess (R)

Newspapers

- Dallas Morning News

==== Predictions ====
| Source | Ranking | As of |
|---|---|---|
| The Cook Political Report | Safe R | November 5, 2012 |
| Rothenberg | Safe R | November 2, 2012 |
| Roll Call | Safe R | November 4, 2012 |
| Sabato's Crystal Ball | Safe R | November 5, 2012 |
| NY Times | Safe R | November 4, 2012 |
| RCP | Safe R | November 4, 2012 |
| The Hill | Safe R | November 4, 2012 |

==== Results ====
Texas 26th congressional district, 2012
| Party | Candidate | Votes | % |
|---|---|---|---|
| Republican | Michael Burgess (incumbent) | 176,642 | 68.27 |
| Democratic | David Sanchez | 74,237 | 28.69 |
| Libertarian | Mark Boler | 7,844 | 3.03 |
| Total votes | | 258,723 | 100.0 |
| Republican hold | | | |

== District 27 ==
2012 Texas's 27th congressional district election
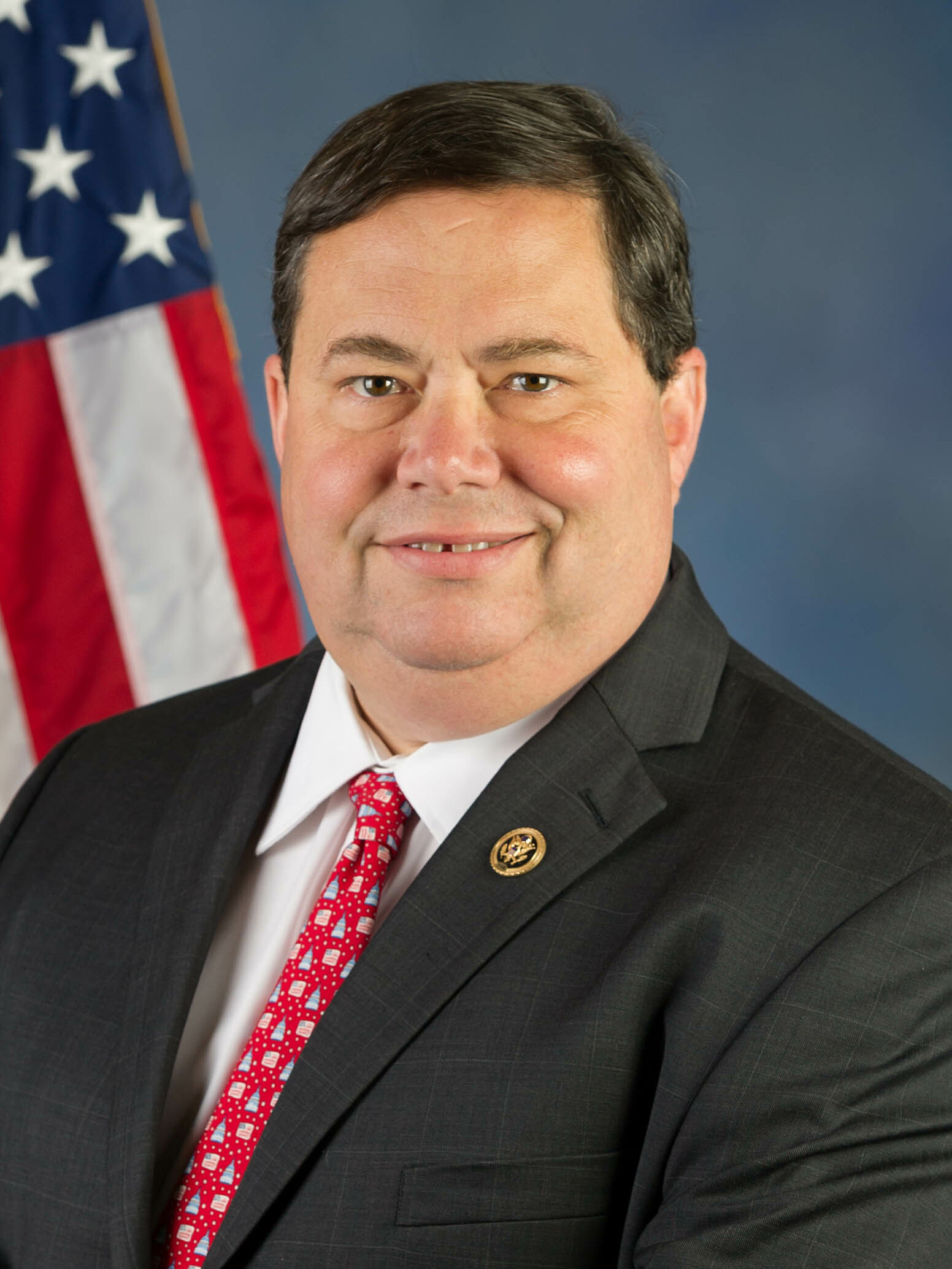

| Nominee | Blake Farenthold | Rose Meza Harrison |
| Party | Republican | Democratic |
| Popular vote | 120,684 | 83,395 |
| Percentage | 56.8% | 39.2% |
- County results Farenthold: 40–50% 50–60% 60–70% 70–80%
U.S. Representative before election
Blake Farenthold
Republican
Elected U.S. Representative
Blake Farenthold
Republican

Republican Blake Farenthold, who had represented Texas's 27th congressional district since 2011, ran for re-election in the redrawn 27th district, having considered running in the new 34th district.

=== Republican primary ===
==== Candidates ====
===== Nominee =====
- Blake Farenthold, incumbent U.S. Representative

===== Eliminated in primary =====
- John Grunwald, accountant
- Don Al Middlebrook, business owner
- Trey Roberts, attorney

===== Declined =====
- Todd Hunter, state representatives
- Raul Torres, state representatives

==== Results ====
Republican Party primary results
| Party | Candidate | Votes | % |
|---|---|---|---|
| Republican | Blake Farenthold (incumbent) | 28,058 | 70.8 |
| Republican | Trey Roberts | 4,653 | 11.7 |
| Republican | Don Al Middlebrook | 3,676 | 9.3 |
| Republican | John Grunwald | 3,256 | 8.2 |
| Total votes | | 39,643 | 100.0 |

=== Democratic primary ===
==== Candidates ====
===== Nominee =====
- Rose Meza Harrison, former chair of the Nueces County Democratic Party

===== Eliminated in primary =====
- Murphy Alade Junaid
- Ronnie McDonald, former judge for the Bastrop County Court
- Jerry Trevino, attorney and business owner

===== Declined =====
- Solomon Ortiz, former U.S. Representative
- Filemon Vela Jr., attorney (running in the 34th)

==== Results ====
Democratic Party primary results
| Party | Candidate | Votes | % |
|---|---|---|---|
| Democratic | Jerry Trevino | 8,231 | 39.8 |
| Democratic | Rose Meza Harrison | 6,354 | 30.7 |
| Democratic | Ronnie McDonald | 5,682 | 27.5 |
| Democratic | Murphy Alade Junaid | 432 | 2.1 |
| Total votes | | 20,699 | 100.0 |
Runoff election
| Democratic | Rose Meza Harrison | 7,024 | 60.6 |
| Democratic | Jerry Trevino | 4,565 | 39.4 |
| Total votes | | 11,589 | 100.00 |

=== Libertarian primary ===
==== Candidates ====
===== Nominee =====
- Corrie Byrd, assistant manager at Walmart

=== Independents ===
Businessman Bret Baldwin, a conservative Republican from Victoria, ran as an independent.

=== General election ===
==== Predictions ====
| Source | Ranking | As of |
|---|---|---|
| The Cook Political Report | Safe R | November 5, 2012 |
| Rothenberg | Safe R | November 2, 2012 |
| Roll Call | Safe R | November 4, 2012 |
| Sabato's Crystal Ball | Safe R | November 5, 2012 |
| NY Times | Safe R | November 4, 2012 |
| RCP | Safe R | November 4, 2012 |
| The Hill | Safe R | November 4, 2012 |

==== Results ====
Texas 27th congressional district, 2012
| Party | Candidate | Votes | % |
|---|---|---|---|
| Republican | Blake Farenthold (incumbent) | 120,684 | 56.75 |
| Democratic | Rose Meza Harrison | 83,395 | 39.22 |
| Independent | Bret Baldwin | 5,354 | 2.52 |
| Libertarian | Corrie Byrd | 3,218 | 1.51 |
| Total votes | | 212,651 | 100.0 |
| Republican hold | | | |

== District 28 ==
2012 Texas's 28th congressional district election
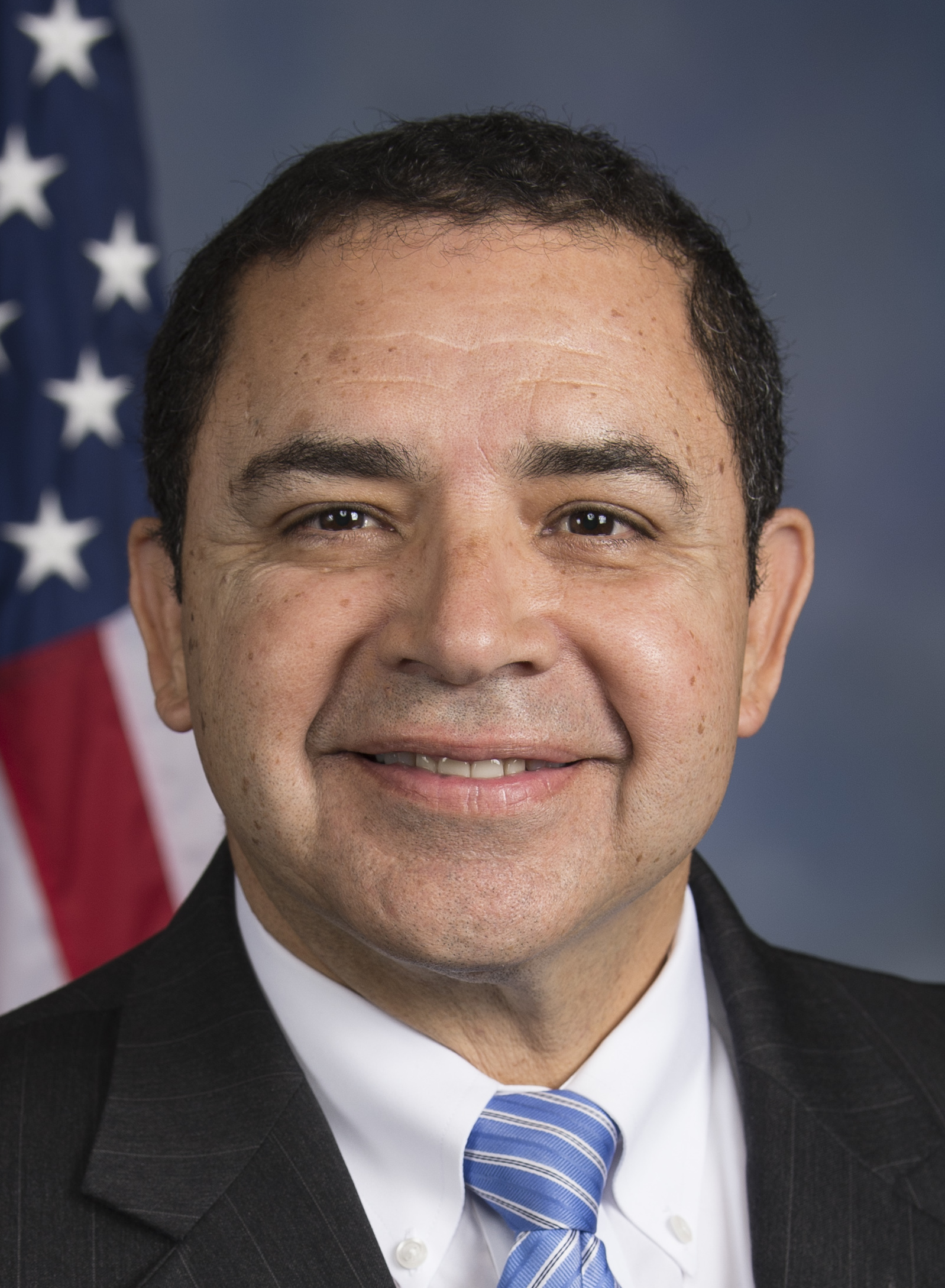

| Nominee | Henry Cuellar | William R. Hayward |
| Party | Democratic | Republican |
| Popular vote | 112,456 | 49,309 |
| Percentage | 67.9% | 29.8% |
- County results Cuellar: 50–60% 70–80% 80–90% >90% Hayward: 50–60%
U.S. Representative before election
Henry Cuellar
Democratic
Elected U.S. Representative
Henry Cuellar
Democratic

Democrat Henry Cuellar, who had represented Texas's 28th congressional district since 2005, ran for re-election.

Guadalupe County, a Republican stronghold, was removed from the reconfigured District 28. Cuellar lost four counties and was held to 56 percent of the general election vote in 2010, when he defeated the Republican Bryan Keith Underwood.

=== Democratic primary ===
==== Candidates ====
===== Nominee =====
- Henry Cuellar, incumbent U.S. Representative

==== Results ====
Democratic Party primary results
| Party | Candidate | Votes | % |
|---|---|---|---|
| Democratic | Henry Cuellar (incumbent) | 35,350 | 100.0 |
| Total votes | | 35,350 | 100.0 |

=== Republican primary ===
==== Candidates ====
===== Nominee =====
- William Hayward, ostrich rancher

==== Results ====
Republican Party primary results
| Party | Candidate | Votes | % |
|---|---|---|---|
| Republican | William Hayward | 9,710 | 100.0 |
| Total votes | | 9,710 | 100.0 |

=== Libertarian primary ===
==== Candidates ====
===== Nominee =====
- Patrick Hisel, physician, nominee for the 12th District in 2010

=== Green primary ===
==== Candidates ====
===== Nominee =====
- Michael D. Cary

=== General election ===
==== Endorsements ====
Henry Cuellar (D)

Organizations

- Blue Dog Coalition

==== Predictions ====
| Source | Ranking | As of |
|---|---|---|
| The Cook Political Report | Safe D | November 5, 2012 |
| Rothenberg | Safe D | November 2, 2012 |
| Roll Call | Safe D | November 4, 2012 |
| Sabato's Crystal Ball | Safe D | November 5, 2012 |
| NY Times | Safe D | November 4, 2012 |
| RCP | Safe D | November 4, 2012 |
| The Hill | Safe D | November 4, 2012 |

==== Results ====
Texas 28th congressional district, 2012
| Party | Candidate | Votes | % |
|---|---|---|---|
| Democratic | Henry Cuellar (incumbent) | 112,456 | 67.89 |
| Republican | William R. Hayward | 49,309 | 29.77 |
| Libertarian | Patrick Hisel | 2,473 | 1.49 |
| Green | Michael D. Cary | 1,407 | 0.85 |
| Total votes | | 165,645 | 100.0 |
| Democratic hold | | | |

== District 29 ==
2012 Texas's 29th congressional district election
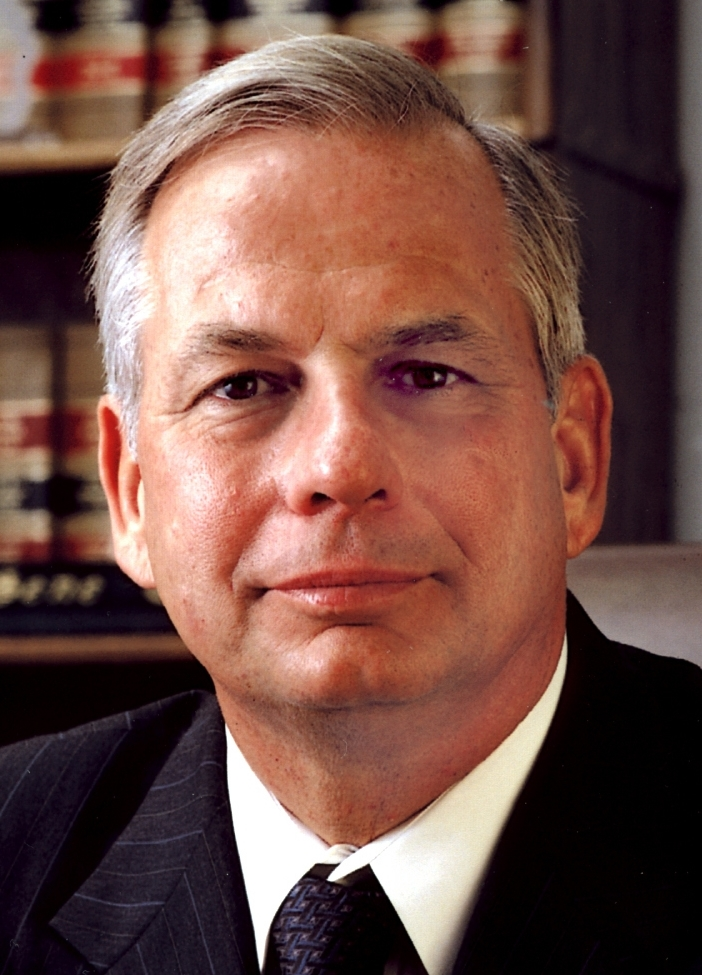

| Nominee | Gene Green | James Stanczak |
| Party | Democratic | Libertarian |
| Popular vote | 86,053 | 4,996 |
| Percentage | 90.0% | 5.2% |
- County results Green: 90–100%
U.S. Representative before election
Gene Green
Democratic
Elected U.S. Representative
Gene Green
Democratic

Democrat Gene Green, who had represented Texas's 29th congressional district since 1993, ran for re-election.

=== Democratic primary ===
==== Candidates ====
===== Nominee =====
- Gene Green, incumbent U.S. Representative

==== Results ====
Democratic Party primary results
| Party | Candidate | Votes | % |
|---|---|---|---|
| Democratic | Gene Green (incumbent) | 10,667 | 100.0 |
| Total votes | | 10,667 | 100.0 |

=== Republican primary ===
No Republicans filed.

=== Libertarian primary ===
==== Candidates ====
===== Nominee =====
- James Stanczak

=== Green primary ===
==== Candidates ====
===== Nominee =====
- Maria Selva

=== General election ===
==== Predictions ====
| Source | Ranking | As of |
|---|---|---|
| The Cook Political Report | Safe D | November 5, 2012 |
| Rothenberg | Safe D | November 2, 2012 |
| Roll Call | Safe D | November 4, 2012 |
| Sabato's Crystal Ball | Safe D | November 5, 2012 |
| NY Times | Safe D | November 4, 2012 |
| RCP | Safe D | November 4, 2012 |
| The Hill | Safe D | November 4, 2012 |

==== Results ====
Texas 29th congressional district, 2012
| Party | Candidate | Votes | % |
|---|---|---|---|
| Democratic | Gene Green (incumbent) | 86,053 | 90.00 |
| Libertarian | James Stanczak | 4,996 | 5.23 |
| Green | Maria Selva | 4,562 | 4.77 |
| Total votes | | 95,611 | 100.0 |
| Democratic hold | | | |

== District 30 ==
2012 Texas's 30th congressional district election
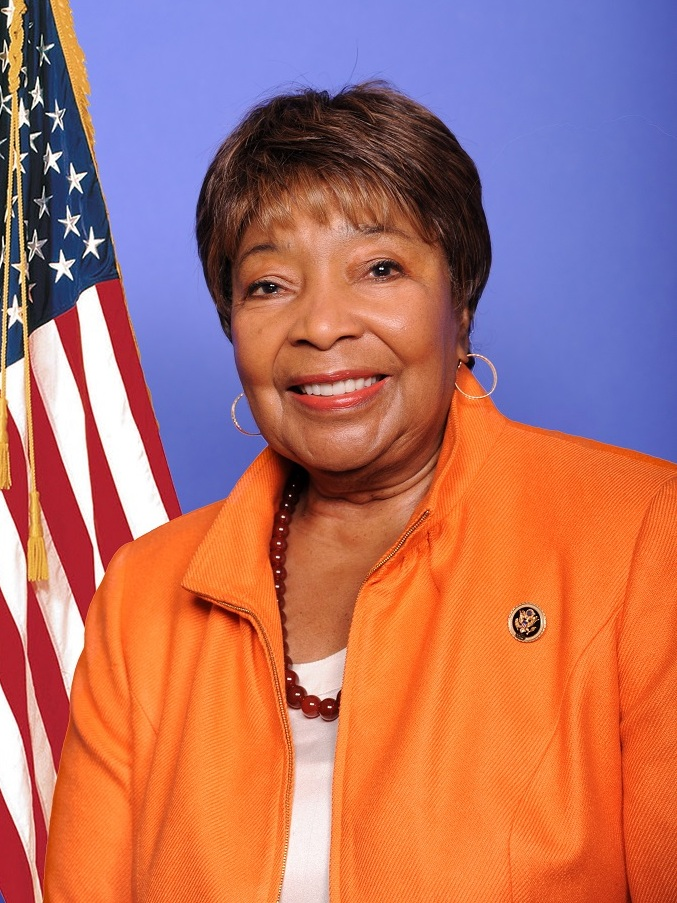

| Nominee | Eddie Bernice Johnson | Travis Washington Jr. |
| Party | Democratic | Republican |
| Popular vote | 171,059 | 41,222 |
| Percentage | 78.8% | 19.0% |
- County results Johnson: 70–80%
U.S. Representative before election
Eddie Bernice Johnson
Democratic
Elected U.S. Representative
Eddie Bernice Johnson
Democratic

Democrat Eddie Bernice Johnson, who had represented Texas's 30th congressional district since 1993, ran for re-election.

=== Democratic primary ===
==== Candidates ====
===== Nominee =====
- Eddie Bernice Johnson, incumbent U.S. Representative

===== Eliminated in primary =====
- Barbara Mallory Caraway, state representative
- Taj Clayton, lawyer

==== Results ====
Democratic Party primary results
| Party | Candidate | Votes | % |
|---|---|---|---|
| Democratic | Eddie Bernice Johnson (incumbent) | 23,346 | 70.1 |
| Democratic | Barbara Mallory Caraway | 5,996 | 18.0 |
| Democratic | Taj Clayton | 3,981 | 12.0 |
| Total votes | | 33,323 | 100.0 |

=== Republican primary ===
==== Candidates ====
===== Nominee =====
- Travis Washington Jr., U.S. Air Force veteran

==== Results ====
Republican Party primary results
| Party | Candidate | Votes | % |
|---|---|---|---|
| Republican | Travis Washington, Jr. | 6,260 | 100.0 |
| Total votes | | 6,260 | 100.0 |

=== Libertarian primary ===
==== Candidates ====
===== Nominee =====
- Ed Rankin, leadership development consultant

=== General election ===
==== Endorsements ====
Eddie Bernice Johnson (D)

Newspapers

- Dallas Morning News

==== Predictions ====
| Source | Ranking | As of |
|---|---|---|
| The Cook Political Report | Safe D | November 5, 2012 |
| Rothenberg | Safe D | November 2, 2012 |
| Roll Call | Safe D | November 4, 2012 |
| Sabato's Crystal Ball | Safe D | November 5, 2012 |
| NY Times | Safe D | November 4, 2012 |
| RCP | Safe D | November 4, 2012 |
| The Hill | Safe D | November 4, 2012 |

==== Results ====
Texas 30th congressional district, 2012
| Party | Candidate | Votes | % |
|---|---|---|---|
| Democratic | Eddie Bernice Johnson (incumbent) | 171,059 | 78.82 |
| Republican | Travis Washington Jr. | 41,222 | 19.00 |
| Libertarian | Ed Rankin | 4,733 | 2.18 |
| Total votes | | 217,014 | 100.0 |
| Democratic hold | | | |

== District 31 ==
2012 Texas's 31st congressional district election
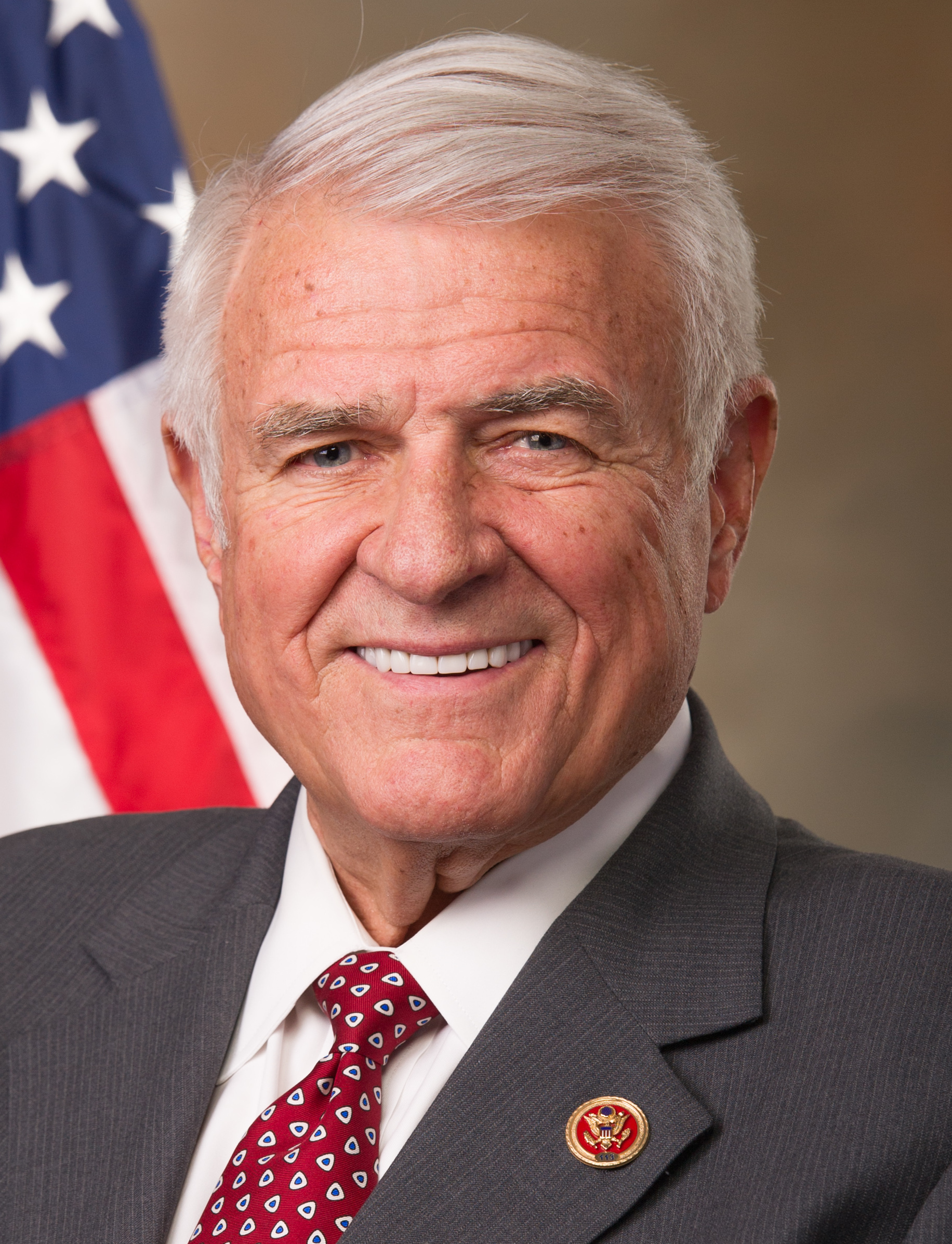

| Nominee | John R. Carter | Stephen M. Wyman |
| Party | Republican | Democratic |
| Popular vote | 145,348 | 82,977 |
| Percentage | 61.3% | 35.0% |
- County results Carter: 60–70%
U.S. Representative before election
John R. Carter
Republican
Elected U.S. Representative
John R. Carter
Republican

Republican John Carter, who had represented Texas's 31st congressional district since 2003, ran for re-election.

=== Republican primary ===
==== Candidates ====
===== Nominee =====
- John Carter, incumbent U.S. Representative

===== Eliminated in primary =====
- Eric Klingemann, small business owner

==== Results ====
Republican Party primary results
| Party | Candidate | Votes | % |
|---|---|---|---|
| Republican | John Carter (incumbent) | 32,917 | 76.0 |
| Republican | Eric Klingemann | 10,400 | 24.0 |
| Total votes | | 43,317 | 100.0 |

=== Democratic primary ===
==== Candidates ====
===== Nominee =====
- Stephen Wyman, technician

==== Results ====
Democratic Party primary results
| Party | Candidate | Votes | % |
|---|---|---|---|
| Democratic | Stephen Wyman | 5,864 | 100.0 |
| Total votes | | 5,864 | 100.0 |

=== Libertarian primary ===
==== Candidates ====
===== Nominee =====
- Ethan Garofolo

=== General election ===
==== Predictions ====
| Source | Ranking | As of |
|---|---|---|
| The Cook Political Report | Safe R | November 5, 2012 |
| Rothenberg | Safe R | November 2, 2012 |
| Roll Call | Safe R | November 4, 2012 |
| Sabato's Crystal Ball | Safe R | November 5, 2012 |
| NY Times | Safe R | November 4, 2012 |
| RCP | Safe R | November 4, 2012 |
| The Hill | Safe R | November 4, 2012 |

==== Results ====
Texas 31st congressional district, 2012
| Party | Candidate | Votes | % |
|---|---|---|---|
| Republican | John R. Carter (incumbent) | 145,348 | 61.28 |
| Democratic | Stephen M. Wyman | 82,977 | 34.98 |
| Libertarian | Ethan Garofolo | 8,862 | 3.74 |
| Total votes | | 237,187 | 100.0 |
| Republican hold | | | |

== District 32 ==
2012 Texas's 32nd congressional district election
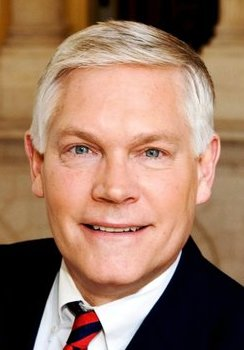

| Nominee | Pete Sessions | Katherine Savers McGovern |
| Party | Republican | Democratic |
| Popular vote | 146,653 | 99,288 |
| Percentage | 58.3% | 39.5% |
- County results Sessions: 50–60% 60–70%
U.S. Representative before election
Pete Sessions
Republican
Elected U.S. Representative
Pete Sessions
Republican

Republican Pete Sessions had represented Texas's 32nd congressional district since 2002, and had represented District 5 from 1996 to 2002. He ran for re-election.

=== Republican primary ===
==== Candidates ====
===== Nominee =====
- Pete Sessions, incumbent U.S. Representative

==== Results ====
Republican Party primary results
| Party | Candidate | Votes | % |
|---|---|---|---|
| Republican | Pete Sessions (incumbent) | 29,523 | 100.0 |
| Total votes | | 29,523 | 100.0 |

=== Democratic primary ===
==== Candidates ====
===== Nominee =====
- Katherine Savers McGovern, former Assistant United States Attorney, Northern District of Texas, Dallas Division

===== Eliminated in primary =====
- Walter Hofheinz, attorney

==== Results ====
Democratic Party primary results
| Party | Candidate | Votes | % |
|---|---|---|---|
| Democratic | Katherine Savers McGovern | 7,301 | 84.2 |
| Democratic | Walter Hofheinz | 1,370 | 15.8 |
| Total votes | | 8,671 | 100.0 |

=== Libertarian primary ===
==== Candidates ====
===== Nominee =====
- Seth Hollist, political columnist

=== General election ===
==== Endorsements ====
Pete Sessions (R)

Newspapers

- Dallas Morning News

==== Predictions ====
| Source | Ranking | As of |
|---|---|---|
| The Cook Political Report | Safe R | November 5, 2012 |
| Rothenberg | Safe R | November 2, 2012 |
| Roll Call | Safe R | November 4, 2012 |
| Sabato's Crystal Ball | Safe R | November 5, 2012 |
| NY Times | Safe R | November 4, 2012 |
| RCP | Safe R | November 4, 2012 |
| The Hill | Safe R | November 4, 2012 |

==== Results ====
Texas 32nd congressional district, 2012
| Party | Candidate | Votes | % |
|---|---|---|---|
| Republican | Pete Sessions (incumbent) | 146,653 | 58.28 |
| Democratic | Katherine Savers McGovern | 99,288 | 39.46 |
| Libertarian | Seth Hollist | 5,695 | 2.26 |
| Total votes | | 251,636 | 100.0 |
| Republican hold | | | |

== District 33 ==
2012 Texas's 33rd congressional district election
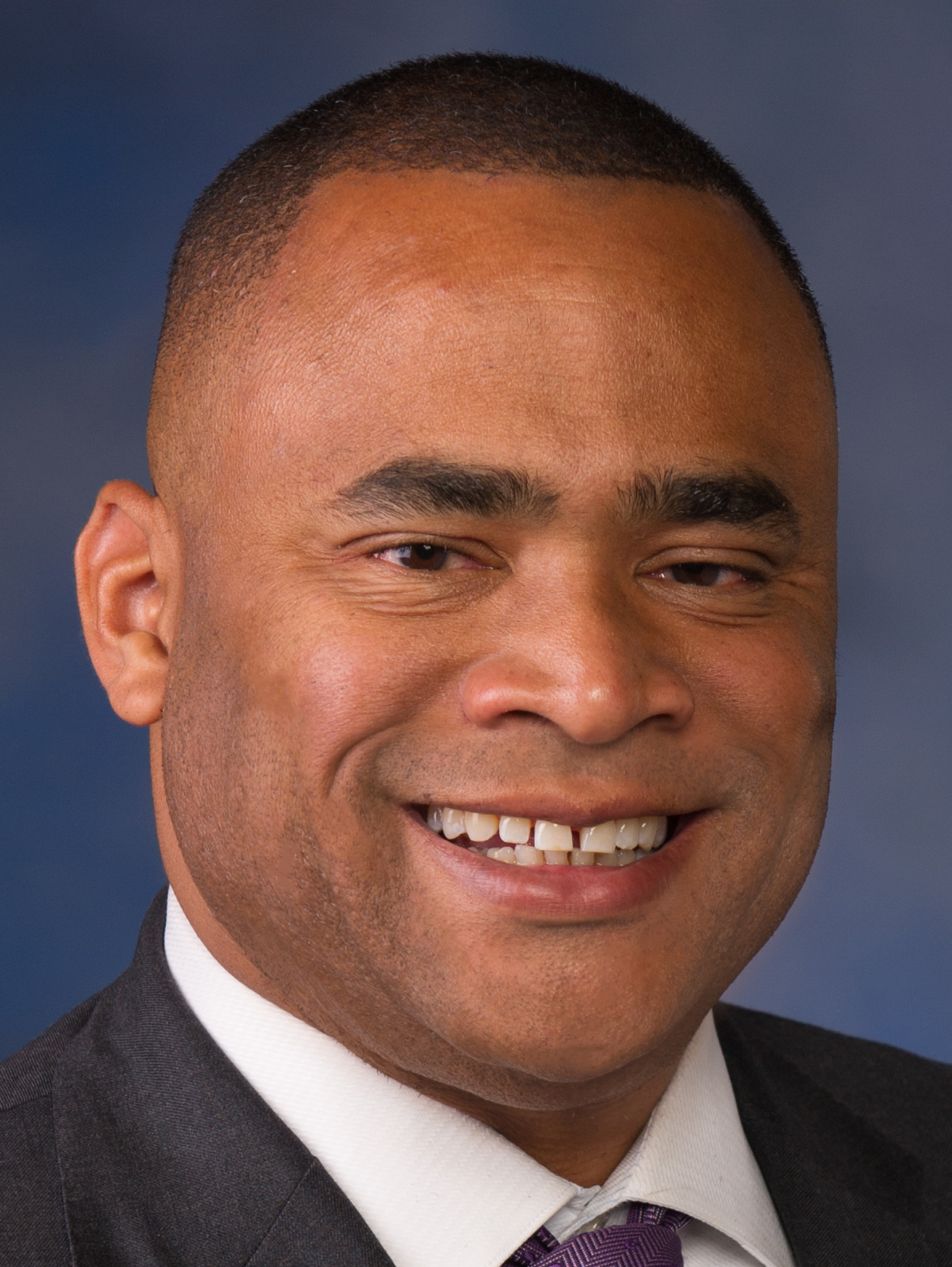

| Nominee | Marc Veasey | Chuck Bradley |
| Party | Democratic | Republican |
| Popular vote | 85,114 | 30,252 |
| Percentage | 72.5% | 25.8% |
- County results Veasey: 60–70% 70–80%
U.S. Representative before election
(None)
New district
Elected U.S. Representative
Marc Veasey
Democratic

The new Texas's 33rd Congressional District includes parts of Dallas County and Tarrant County. In Dallas County, the district covers parts of Dallas, Irving, and Grand Prairie, and all of Cockrell Hill. In Tarrant County, the district includes parts of Arlington, Forest Hill, Fort Worth, Grand Prairie, Haltom City, Saginaw and Sansom Park, and all of Everman. It was expected to be a safe seat for the Democrats.

=== Democratic primary ===
==== Candidates ====
===== Nominee =====
- Marc Veasey, state representative

===== Eliminated in primary =====
- David Alameel, dentist and businessman
- Chrysta Castañeda, attorney
- Domingo García, former state representative
- Kathleen Hicks, Fort Worth City Council member
- J.R. Molina, attorney
- Carlos Quintanilla, business owner and activist
- Jason Roberts, founder of the National Better Block
- Steve Salazar, former Dallas City Council member
- Kyev Tatum, community activist and head of the Tarrant County chapter of the Southern Christian Leadership Conference
- Manuel Valdez, justice of the peace

===== Withdrawn =====
- David De La Paz, businessman

===== Declined =====
- Art Brender, attorney and former chair of the Tarrant County Democratic Party

==== Results ====
Democratic Party primary results
| Party | Candidate | Votes | % |
|---|---|---|---|
| Democratic | Marc Veasey | 6,938 | 36.77 |
| Democratic | Domingo Garcia | 4,715 | 24.98 |
| Democratic | Kathleen Hicks | 2,372 | 12.57 |
| Democratic | David Alameel | 2,064 | 10.93 |
| Democratic | Manuel Valdez | 884 | 4.68 |
| Democratic | Steve Salazar | 482 | 2.55 |
| Democratic | Chrysta Castañeda | 395 | 2.09 |
| Democratic | Jason E. Roberts | 342 | 1.81 |
| Democratic | Carlos Quintanilla | 286 | 1.51 |
| Democratic | Kyev P. Tatum, Sr. | 201 | 1.06 |
| Democratic | J. R. Molina | 189 | 1.00 |
| Total votes | | 18,868 | 100.00 |
Runoff election
| Democratic | Marc Veasey | 10,766 | 52.72 |
| Democratic | Domingo Garcia | 9,653 | 47.27 |
| Total votes | | 20,419 | 100.00 |

=== Republican primary ===
Though his hometown of Arlington is contained entirely within the 33rd district, Republican Joe Barton, who had represented the 6th district since 1985, ran again in the 6th district. During redistricting, Republicans Bill Lawrence, former mayor of Highland Village, former Secretary of State Roger Williams and former Railroad Commissioner Michael L. Williams had all at one point considered running in a district numbered the 33rd. After the district map was finalized, Lawrence ran for the 12th district, and Roger Williams and Michael Williams both switched to the 25th.

==== Candidates ====
===== Nominee =====
- Chuck Bradley, retired businessman

===== Eliminated in primary =====
- Charles King, SMU graduate and car wash manager

===== Withdrawn =====
- Al Lee, retired systems consultant
- Monte Mitchell

==== Results ====
Republican Party primary results
| Party | Candidate | Votes | % |
|---|---|---|---|
| Republican | Chuck Bradley | 3,706 | 63.78 |
| Republican | Charles King | 2,104 | 36.21 |
| Total votes | | 5,810 | 100.00 |

=== Green primary ===
==== Candidates ====
===== Nominee =====
- Ed Lindsay

=== General election ===
==== Endorsements ====
Marc Veasey (D)

Newspapers

- Dallas Morning News

==== Predictions ====
| Source | Ranking | As of |
|---|---|---|
| The Cook Political Report | Safe D (flip) | November 5, 2012 |
| Rothenberg | Safe D (flip) | November 2, 2012 |
| Roll Call | Safe D (flip) | November 4, 2012 |
| Sabato's Crystal Ball | Safe D (flip) | November 5, 2012 |
| NY Times | Safe D (flip) | November 4, 2012 |
| RCP | Safe D (flip) | November 4, 2012 |
| The Hill | Safe D (flip) | November 4, 2012 |

==== Results ====
Texas 33rd congressional district, 2012
| Party | Candidate | Votes | % |
|---|---|---|---|
| Democratic | Marc Veasey | 85,114 | 72.51 |
| Republican | Chuck Bradley | 30,252 | 25.77 |
| Green | Ed Lindsay | 2,009 | 1.71 |
| Total votes | | 117,375 | 100.0 |
| Democratic win (new seat) | | | |

== District 34 ==
2012 Texas's 34th congressional district election
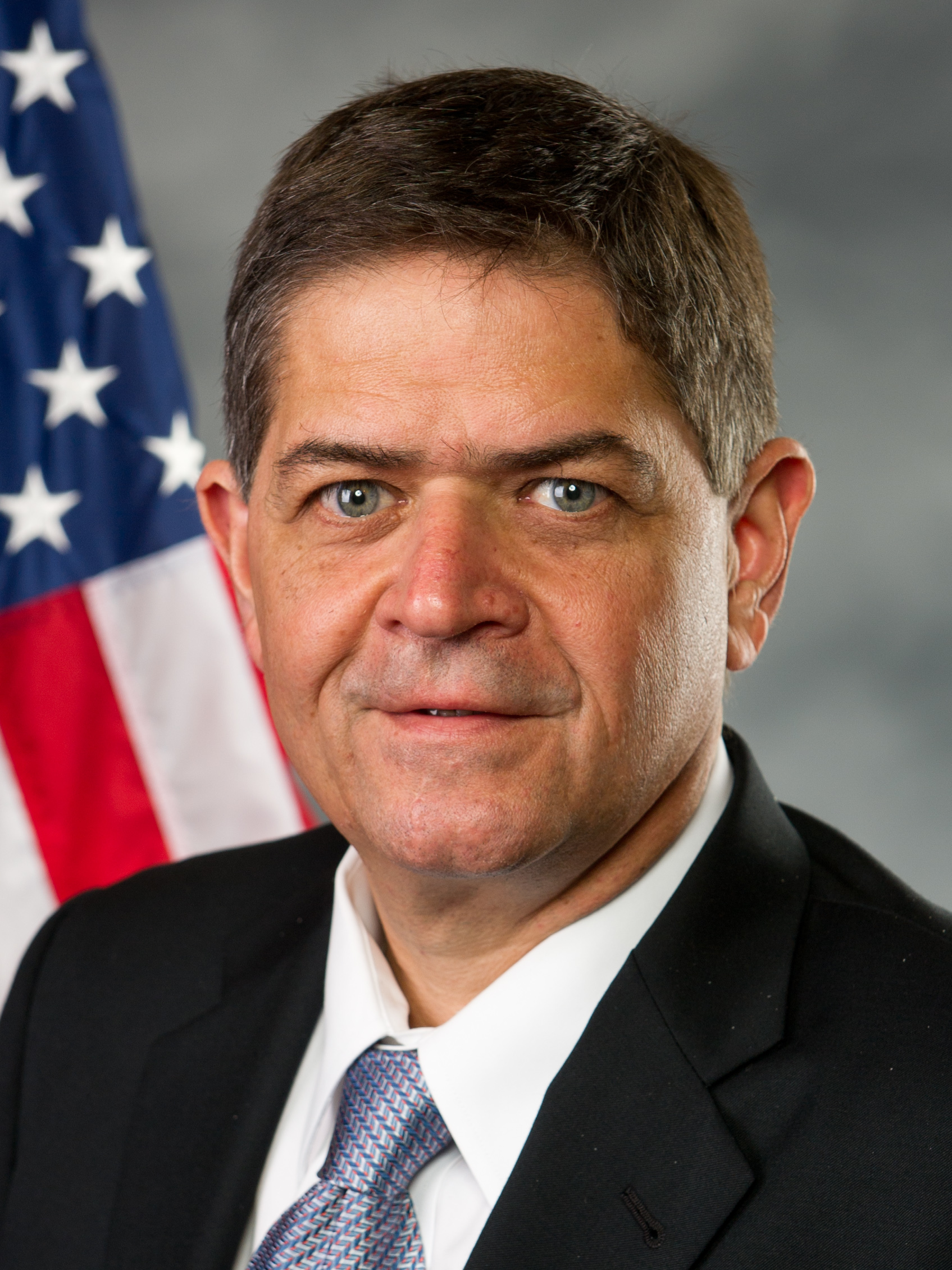

| Nominee | Filemon Vela Jr. | Jessica Puente Bradshaw |
| Party | Democratic | Republican |
| Popular vote | 89,606 | 52,448 |
| Percentage | 61.9% | 36.2% |
- County results Vela: 50–60% 60–70% 70–80% Bradshaw: 50–60% 60–70% 70–80%
U.S. Representative before election
(None)
New District
Elected U.S. Representative
Filemon Vela Jr.
Democratic

The 34th is a newly numbered district. Half of the voters came from the 27th district once held by both Solomon Ortiz and Blake Farenthold, and most of the remainder came from the 15th. It contains all of Cameron, Willacy, Kleberg, Kenedy, Jim Wells, Bee, Goliad and DeWitt counties, and parts of Gonzales, San Patricio and Hidalgo counties. It is 73.1% Hispanic by citizen voting population, and voted for President Obama 60–39 in 2008.

=== Democratic primary ===
==== Candidates ====
===== Nominee =====
- Filemon Vela Jr., attorney

===== Eliminated in primary =====
- Elmo Aycock, U.S. Marine
- Denise Saenz Blanchard, former Chief of Staff to Solomon Ortiz
- Ramiro Garza Jr., former Edinburg City Manager
- Juan Angel Guerra, attorney
- Salomon Torres, former district director for Rubén Hinojosa
- Anthony Troiani, Brownsville City Commissioner
- Armando Villalobos, Cameron County District Attorney

==== Results ====
Vela and Blanchard advanced to the July 31 runoff, with Vela easily winning.

Democratic Party primary results
| Party | Candidate | Votes | % |
|---|---|---|---|
| Democratic | Filemon Vela Jr. | 18,233 | 40.5 |
| Democratic | Denise Blanchard | 5,810 | 12.9 |
| Democratic | Ramiro Garza Jr. | 5,575 | 12.4 |
| Democratic | Salomon Torres | 4,745 | 10.5 |
| Democratic | Armando Villalobos | 3,926 | 8.7 |
| Democratic | Anthony Troiani | 3,638 | 8.1 |
| Democratic | Juan Angel Guerra | 2,200 | 4.9 |
| Democratic | Elmo Aycock | 935 | 2.1 |
| Total votes | | 45,062 | 100.0 |
Runoff election
| Democratic | Filemon Vela Jr. | 15,628 | 66.6 |
| Democratic | Denise Blanchard | 7,824 | 33.4 |
| Total votes | | 23,452 | 100.0 |

=== Republican primary ===
==== Candidates ====
===== Nominee =====
- Jessica Bradshaw, political news commentator

===== Eliminated in primary =====
- Adela Garza, small business owner
- Paul Harding, attorney

===== Withdrawn =====
- Marc Young

==== Results ====
Garza and Bradshaw advanced to the July 31 runoff.

Republican Party primary results
| Party | Candidate | Votes | % |
|---|---|---|---|
| Republican | Adela Garza | 4,632 | 36.3 |
| Republican | Jessica Bradshaw | 4,409 | 34.6 |
| Republican | Paul Haring | 3,710 | 29.1 |
| Total votes | | 12,751 | 100.0 |
Runoff election
| Republican | Jessica Bradshaw | 5,309 | 55.3 |
| Republican | Adela Garza | 4,287 | 44.7 |
| Total votes | | 9,596 | 100.0 |

=== Libertarian primary ===
==== Candidates ====
===== Nominee =====
- Steven Shanklin

=== General election ===
==== Forum ====
2012 Texas's 34th congressional district candidate forum
| No. | Date | Host | Moderator | Link | Democratic | Republican |
| Key: P Participant A Absent N Not invited I Invited W Withdrawn | | | | | | |
| Key: P Participant A Absent N Not invited I Invited W Withdrawn | | | | | Filemon Vela Jr. | Jessica Bradshaw |
|---|---|---|---|---|---|---|
| 1 | Oct. 23, 2012 | KURV; KVEO-TV; Rio Grande Guardian | Sergio Sanchez; Steve Taylor; Ryan Wolf | | P | P |

==== Endorsements ====
Filemon Vela Jr. (D)

Organizations

- Democratic Congressional Campaign Committee "Majority Makers" Program

==== Predictions ====
| Source | Ranking | As of |
|---|---|---|
| The Cook Political Report | Safe D (flip) | November 5, 2012 |
| Rothenberg | Safe D (flip) | November 2, 2012 |
| Roll Call | Safe D (flip) | November 4, 2012 |
| Sabato's Crystal Ball | Safe D (flip) | November 5, 2012 |
| NY Times | Safe D (flip) | November 4, 2012 |
| RCP | Safe D (flip) | November 4, 2012 |
| The Hill | Likely D (flip) | November 4, 2012 |

==== Results ====
Texas 34th congressional district, 2012
| Party | Candidate | Votes | % |
|---|---|---|---|
| Democratic | Filemon Vela Jr. | 89,606 | 61.89 |
| Republican | Jessica Puente Bradshaw | 52,448 | 36.23 |
| Libertarian | Steven (Ziggy) Shanklin | 2,724 | 1.88 |
| Total votes | | 144,778 | 100.0 |
| Democratic win (new seat) | | | |

== District 35 ==
2012 Texas's 35th congressional district election
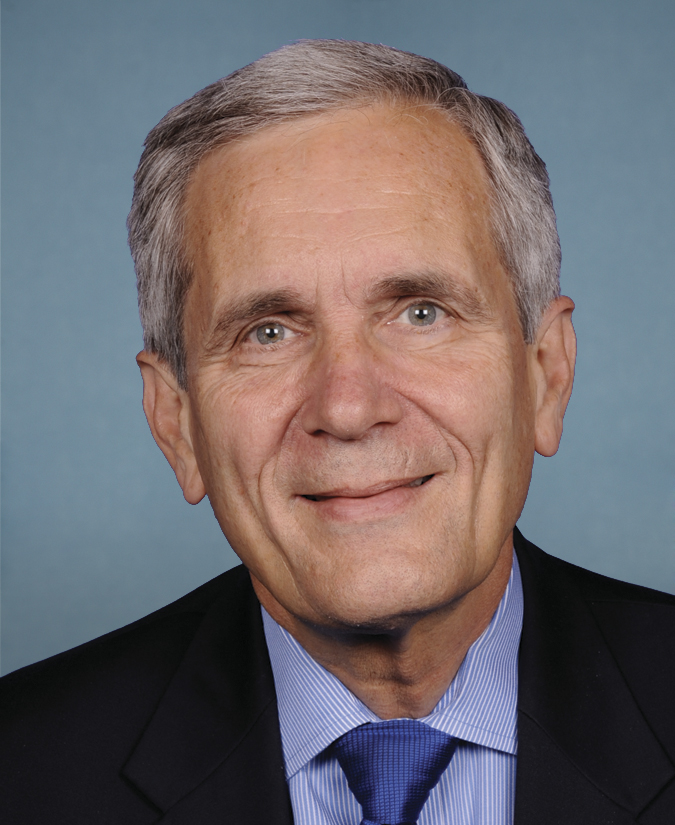

| Nominee | Lloyd Doggett | Susan Narvaiz |
| Party | Democratic | Republican |
| Popular vote | 105,626 | 52,894 |
| Percentage | 64.0% | 32.0% |
- County results Doggett: 50–60% 60–70% 70–80% Narvaiz: 60–70%
U.S. Representative before election
Lloyd Doggett
Democratic
Elected U.S. Representative
Lloyd Doggett
Democratic

Texas's 35th Congressional District includes parts of the San Antonio metropolitan area, including portions of Bexar County, thin strips of Comal and Hays, and all of Caldwell and Atascosa counties, as well as portions of southern and eastern Austin in Travis County largely from the 25th.

Democratic U.S. Representative Lloyd Doggett, who had represented Texas's 25th congressional district since 2005, ran for re-election in the 35th district.

=== Democratic primary ===
==== Candidates ====
===== Nominee =====
- Lloyd Doggett, incumbent U.S. Representative

===== Eliminated in primary =====
- Maria Luisa Alvarado, retired United States Air Force master sergeant and nominee for lieutenant governor in 2006
- Sylvia Romo, Bexar County tax collector

===== Withdrawn =====
- Patrick Shearer

===== Declined =====
- Joaquín Castro, state representative (running in the 20th district)
- Richard Perez, former San Antonio City Council member
- Ciro Rodriguez, former U.S. Representative

==== Results ====
Democratic Party primary results
| Party | Candidate | Votes | % |
|---|---|---|---|
| Democratic | Lloyd Doggett (incumbent) | 14,559 | 73.3 |
| Democratic | Sylvia Romo | 4,212 | 21.2 |
| Democratic | Maria Alvarado | 1,105 | 5.6 |
| Total votes | | 19,876 | 100.0 |

=== Republican primary ===
==== Candidates ====
===== Nominee =====
- Susan Narvaiz, former mayor of San Marcos

===== Eliminated in primary =====
- Rob Roark, conservative activist
- John Yoggerst

==== Results ====
In the Republican primary, conducted May 29, 2012, Narvaiz won and avoided a runoff by obtaining 51.78% of the votes cast.

Republican Party primary results
| Party | Candidate | Votes | % |
|---|---|---|---|
| Republican | Susan Narvaiz | 6,040 | 51.8 |
| Republican | Rob Roark | 3,454 | 29.6 |
| Republican | John Yoggerst | 2,171 | 18.6 |
| Total votes | | 11,665 | 100.0 |

=== Libertarian primary ===
==== Candidates ====
===== Nominee =====
- Ross Leone

=== Green primary ===
==== Candidates ====
===== Nominee =====
- Meghan Owen, activist, musician, engineer, former military contractor and HVAC technician

=== General election ===
==== Endorsements ====
Lloyd Doggett (D)

Newspapers

- The Austin Chronicle

==== Predictions ====
| Source | Ranking | As of |
|---|---|---|
| The Cook Political Report | Safe D (flip) | November 5, 2012 |
| Rothenberg | Safe D (flip) | November 2, 2012 |
| Roll Call | Safe D (flip) | November 4, 2012 |
| Sabato's Crystal Ball | Safe D (flip) | November 5, 2012 |
| NY Times | Safe D (flip) | November 4, 2012 |
| RCP | Safe D (flip) | November 4, 2012 |
| The Hill | Safe D (flip) | November 4, 2012 |

==== Results ====
Texas 35th congressional district, 2012
| Party | Candidate | Votes | % |
|---|---|---|---|
| Democratic | Lloyd Doggett (incumbent) | 105,626 | 63.95 |
| Republican | Susan Narvaiz | 52,894 | 32.02 |
| Libertarian | Ross Lynn Leone | 4,082 | 2.47 |
| Green | Meghan Owen | 2,540 | 1.54 |
| Total votes | | 165,179 | 100.0 |
| Democratic hold | | | |

== District 36 ==
2012 Texas's 36th congressional district election
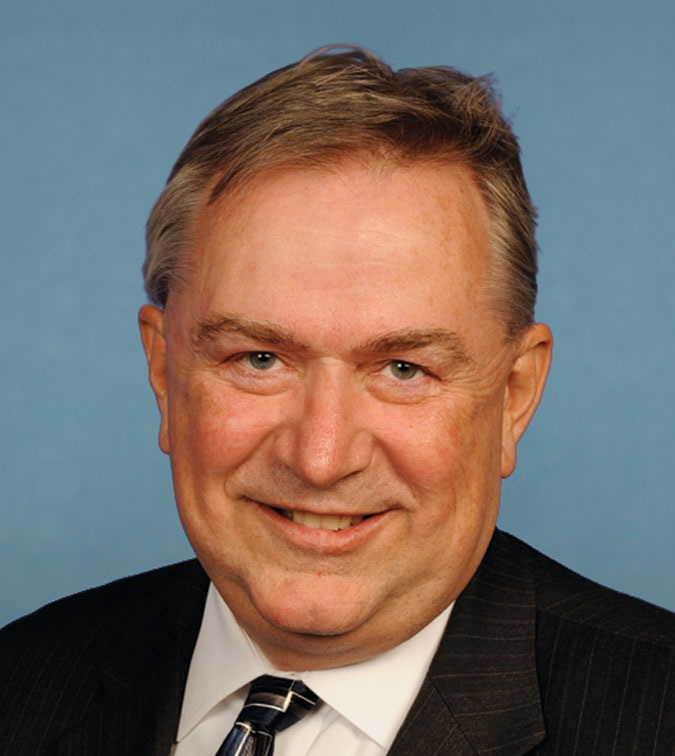

| Nominee | Steve Stockman | Max Martin |
| Party | Republican | Democratic |
| Popular vote | 165,405 | 62,143 |
| Percentage | 70.7% | 26.6% |
- County results Stockman: 60–70% 70–80% 80–90%
U.S. Representative before election
(None)
New District
Elected U.S. Representative
Steve Stockman
Republican

Texas's 36th congressional district is one of four new districts, including all or part of Chambers County, Hardin County, Harris County, Jasper County, Liberty County, Newton County, Orange County, Polk County and Tyler County.

=== Republican primary ===
==== Candidates ====
===== Nominee =====
- Steve Stockman, former U.S. Representative

===== Eliminated in primary =====
- Keith Casey
- Jerry Doyle
- Jim Engstrand, U.S. Army Reserve colonel and small business owner
- Ky Griffin, funeral director and small business owner
- Mike Jackson, state senator
- Charles Meyer, attorney
- Kim Morrell, former Seabrook City Council member and small business owner
- Lois Dickson Myers, real estate broker
- Stephen Takach, financial advisor
- Daniel Whitton
- Tim Wintill

===== Declined =====
- Brian Babin, dentist and nominee for the 2nd district in 1996 and 1998
- Travis Bryan, precinct chair and former Texas State Guard soldier
- John Manlove, Mayor of Pasadena
- James White, state representative

==== Results ====
Republican Party primary results
| Party | Candidate | Votes | % |
|---|---|---|---|
| Republican | Stephen Takach | 12,208 | 22.4 |
| Republican | Steve Stockman | 11,858 | 21.8 |
| Republican | Mike Jackson | 10,786 | 19.8 |
| Republican | Jim Engstrand | 5,114 | 9.4 |
| Republican | Ky Griffin | 4,025 | 7.4 |
| Republican | Charles Meyer | 2,156 | 4.0 |
| Republican | Kim Morrell | 1,930 | 3.6 |
| Republican | Lois Myers | 1,558 | 2.9 |
| Republican | Jerry Doyle | 1,479 | 2.7 |
| Republican | Keith Casey | 1,225 | 2.3 |
| Republican | Daniel Whitton | 1,110 | 2.0 |
| Republican | Tim Wintill | 984 | 1.8 |
| Total votes | | 54,433 | 100.0 |
Runoff election
| Republican | Steve Stockman | 21,472 | 55.3 |
| Republican | Stephen Takach | 17,378 | 44.7 |
| Total votes | | 38,850 | 100.0 |

=== Democratic primary ===
==== Candidates ====
===== Nominee =====
- Max Martin, businessman and pilot

==== Results ====
Democratic Party primary results
| Party | Candidate | Votes | % |
|---|---|---|---|
| Democratic | Max Martin | 9,869 | 100.0 |
| Total votes | | 9,869 | 100.0 |

=== Libertarian primary ===
==== Candidates ====
===== Nominee =====
- Michael Cole, educator

=== General election ===
==== Endorsements ====
Steve Stockman (R)

Organizations

- National Republican Congressional Committee "Vanguard" Program
Max Martin (D)

Newspapers

- Houston Chronicle

==== Predictions ====
| Source | Ranking | As of |
|---|---|---|
| The Cook Political Report | Safe R (flip) | November 5, 2012 |
| Rothenberg | Safe R (flip) | November 2, 2012 |
| Roll Call | Safe R (flip) | November 4, 2012 |
| Sabato's Crystal Ball | Safe R (flip) | November 5, 2012 |
| NY Times | Safe R (flip) | November 4, 2012 |
| RCP | Safe R (flip) | November 4, 2012 |
| The Hill | Safe R (flip) | November 4, 2012 |

==== Results ====
Texas 36th congressional district 2012
| Party | Candidate | Votes | % |
|---|---|---|---|
| Republican | Steve Stockman | 165,405 | 70.74 |
| Democratic | Max Martin | 62,143 | 26.58 |
| Libertarian | Michael K. Cole | 6,284 | 2.69 |
| Total votes | | 233,832 | 100.0 |
| Republican win (new seat) | | | |
