= 2010 United States House of Representatives elections in Texas =

- November 2, 2010

All 32 Texas seats to the United States House of Representatives
- Turnout: 4,745,613 - 25%
	Majority party	Minority party
Party	Republican	Democratic
Seats before	20	12
Seats won	23	9
Seat change	▲3	▼3
Popular vote	3,058,228	1,450,197
Percentage	64.4%	30.6%
Swing	▲8.6%	▼9.0%

Republican
40–50%
50–60%
60–70%
70–80%
80–90%
90–100%
Democratic
50–60%
60–70%
70–80%
80–90%

The 2010 U.S. congressional elections in Texas were held on November 2, 2010, to determine who will represent the state of Texas in the United States House of Representatives. Representatives are elected for two-year terms; those elected served in the 112th Congress from January 2011 until January 2013.

With 27% of the voting age public turning out, the Republican Party won 23 seats and the Democratic Party won 9 seats. Three house seats changed parties this election, with the 17th, 23rd, and 27th districts all flipping from Democratic to Republican seats.

== Overview ==
Results of the 2010 United States House of Representatives elections in Texas by district:

District	Republican		Democratic		Others		Total		Result
District	Votes	%	Votes	%	Votes	%	Votes	%	Result
District 1	129,398	89.73%	0	0.00%	14,811	10.27%	144,209	100%	Republican hold
District 2	130,020	88.61%	0	0.00%	16,711	11.39%	146,731	100%	Republican hold
District 3	101,180	66.28%	47,848	31.34%	3,624	2.37%	152,652	100%	Republican hold
District 4	136,338	73.19%	40,975	22.00%	8,973	4.82%	186,286	100%	Republican hold
District 5	106,742	70.53%	41,649	27.52%	2,958	1.95%	151,349	100%	Republican hold
District 6	107,140	65.91%	50,717	31.20%	4,700	2.89%	162,557	100%	Republican hold
District 7	143,655	81.45%	0	0.00%	32,723	18.55%	176,378	100%	Republican hold
District 8	161,417	80.27%	34,694	17.25%	4,988	2.48%	201,099	100%	Republican hold
District 9	24,201	22.88%	80,107	75.74%	1,459	1.38%	105,767	100%	Democratic hold
District 10	144,980	64.67%	74,086	33.05%	5,105	2.28%	224,171	100%	Republican hold
District 11	125,581	80.84%	23,989	15.44%	5,770	3.71%	155,340	100%	Republican hold
District 12	109,882	71.86%	38,434	25.13%	4,601	3.01%	152,917	100%	Republican hold
District 13	113,201	87.05%	0	0.00%	16,842	12.95%	130,043	100%	Republican hold
District 14	140,623	75.99%	44,431	24.01%	0	0.00%	185,054	100%	Republican hold
District 15	39,964	41.59%	53,546	55.73%	2,570	2.67%	96,080	100%	Democratic hold
District 16	31,051	36.58%	49,301	58.07%	4,540	5.35%	84,892	100%	Democratic hold
District 17	106,696	61.80%	63,138	36.57%	2,808	1.63%	172,642	100%	Republican gain
District 18	33,067	27.26%	85,108	70.15%	3,146	2.59%	121,321	100%	Democratic hold
District 19	106,059	77.78%	25,984	19.06%	4,315	3.16%	136,358	100%	Republican hold
District 20	31,757	34.45%	58,645	63.62%	1,783	1.93%	92,185	100%	Democratic hold
District 21	162,924	68.88%	65,927	27.87%	7,694	3.25%	236,545	100%	Republican hold
District 22	140,537	67.49%	62,082	29.82%	5,604	2.69%	208,223	100%	Republican hold
District 23	74,853	49.40%	67,348	44.44%	9,333	6.16%	151,534	100%	Republican gain
District 24	100,078	81.57%	0	0.00%	22,609	18.43%	122,687	100%	Republican hold
District 25	84,849	44.84%	99,967	52.82%	4,431	2.34%	189,247	100%	Democratic hold
District 26	120,984	67.05%	55,385	30.70%	4,062	2.25%	180,431	100%	Republican hold
District 27	50,976	47.85%	50,179	47.10%	5,376	5.05%	106,531	100%	Republican gain
District 28	46,740	41.96%	62,773	56.35%	1,889	1.70%	111,402	100%	Democratic hold
District 29	22,825	34.09%	43,257	64.61%	866	1.29%	66,948	100%	Democratic hold
District 30	24,668	21.64%	86,322	75.74%	2,988	2.62%	113,978	100%	Democratic hold
District 31	126,384	82.54%	0	0.00%	26,735	17.46%	153,119	100%	Republican hold
District 32	79,433	62.61%	44,258	34.88%	3,178	2.50%	126,869	100%	Republican hold
Total	3,058,203	64.44%	1,450,150	30.56%	237,192	5.00%	4,745,545	100%	

== District 1 ==
2010 Texas's 1st congressional district election
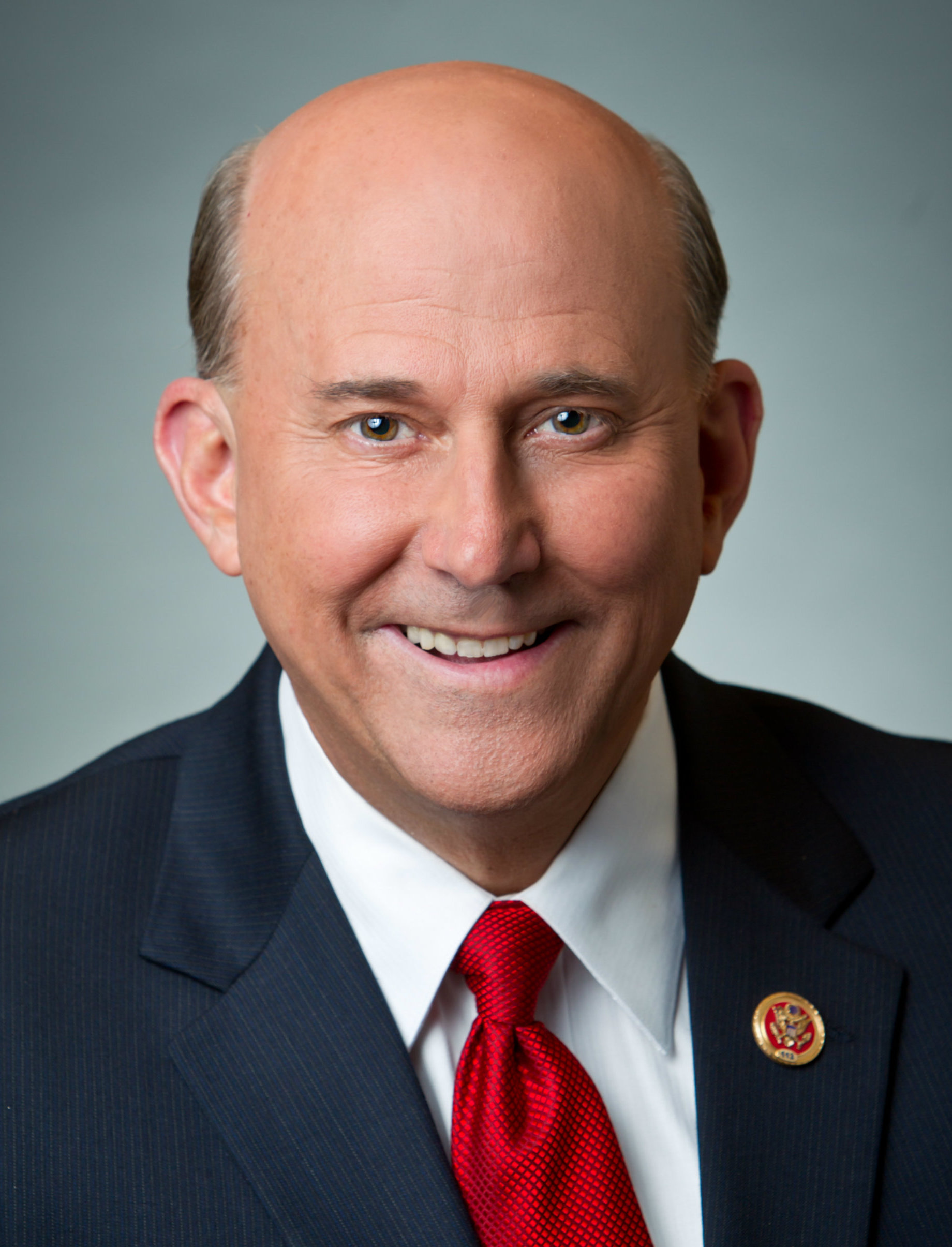

Nominee	Louie Gohmert	Charles F. Parkes, III
Party	Republican	Libertarian
Popular vote	129,398	14,811
Percentage	89.7%	10.3%
- County results Gohmert: 80–90% 90–100%
U.S. Representative before election
Louie Gohmert
Republican
Elected U.S. Representative
Louie Gohmert
Republican

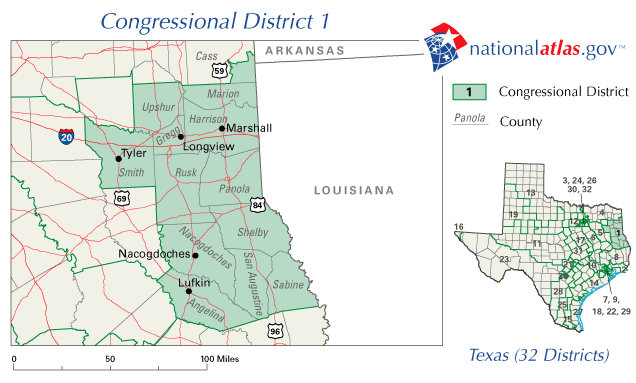

Republican incumbent Louie Gohmert ran for reelection.

Predictions

Source	Ranking	As of
The Cook Political Report	Safe R	November 1, 2010
Rothenberg	Safe R	November 1, 2010
Sabato's Crystal Ball	Safe R	November 1, 2010
RCP	Safe R	November 1, 2010
CQ Politics	Safe R	October 28, 2010
New York Times	Safe R	November 1, 2010
FiveThirtyEight	Safe R	November 1, 2010

General election results

Texas's 1st congressional district, 2010
Party	Candidate	Votes	%
Republican	Louie Gohmert	129,398	89.73
Libertarian	Charles F. Parkes, III	14,811	10.27
Total votes		144,209	100
Republican hold			

== District 2 ==
2010 Texas's 2nd congressional district election
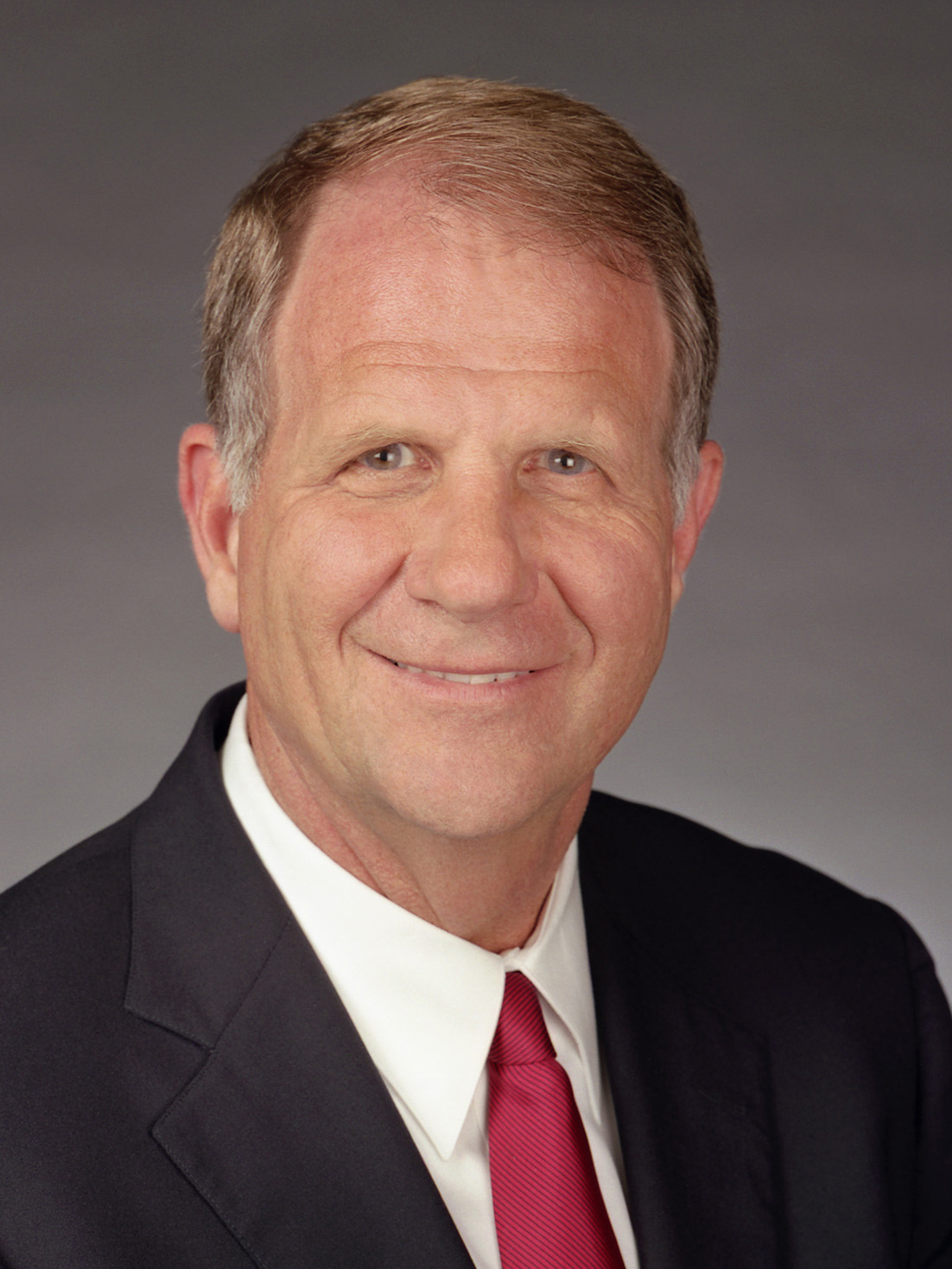

Nominee	Ted Poe	David W. Smith
Party	Republican	Libertarian
Popular vote	130,020	16,711
Percentage	88.6%	11.4%
- County results Poe: 80–90% 90–100%
U.S. Representative before election
Ted Poe
Republican
Elected U.S. Representative
Ted Poe
Republican

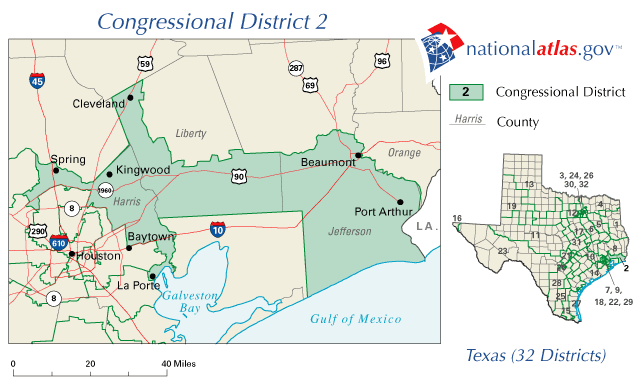

Republican incumbent Ted Poe ran for reelection.

Predictions

Source	Ranking	As of
The Cook Political Report	Safe R	November 1, 2010
Rothenberg	Safe R	November 1, 2010
Sabato's Crystal Ball	Safe R	November 1, 2010
RCP	Safe R	November 1, 2010
CQ Politics	Safe R	October 28, 2010
New York Times	Safe R	November 1, 2010
FiveThirtyEight	Safe R	November 1, 2010

General election results

Texas's 2nd congressional district, 2010
Party	Candidate	Votes	%
Republican	Ted Poe	130,020	88.61
Libertarian	David W. Smith	16,711	11.39
Total votes		146,731	100
Republican hold			

== District 3 ==
2010 Texas's 3rd congressional district election
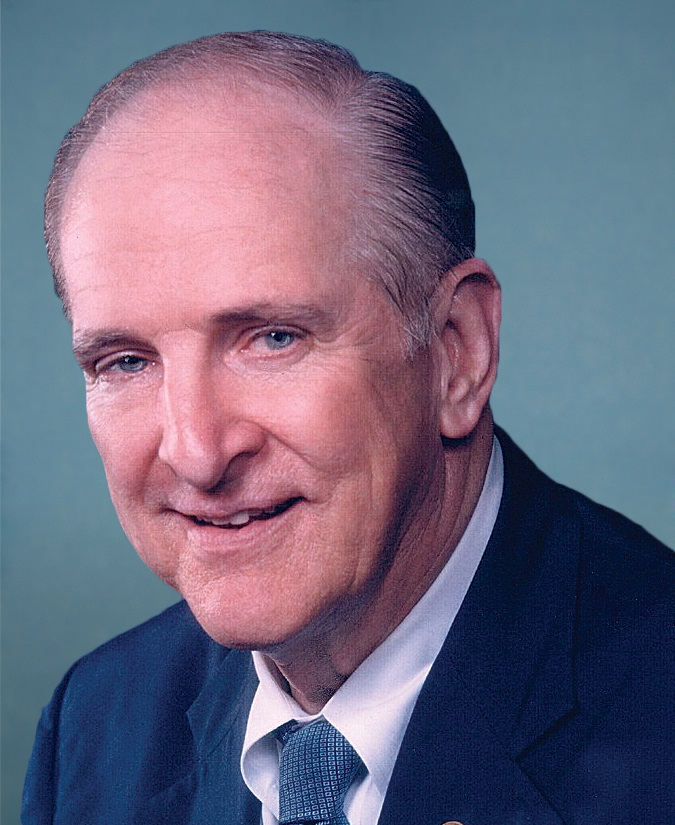

Nominee	Sam Johnson	John Lingenfelder
Party	Republican	Democratic
Popular vote	101,180	47,848
Percentage	66.3%	31.3%
- County results Johnson: 50–60% 60–70%
U.S. Representative before election
Sam Johnson
Republican
Elected U.S. Representative
Sam Johnson
Republican

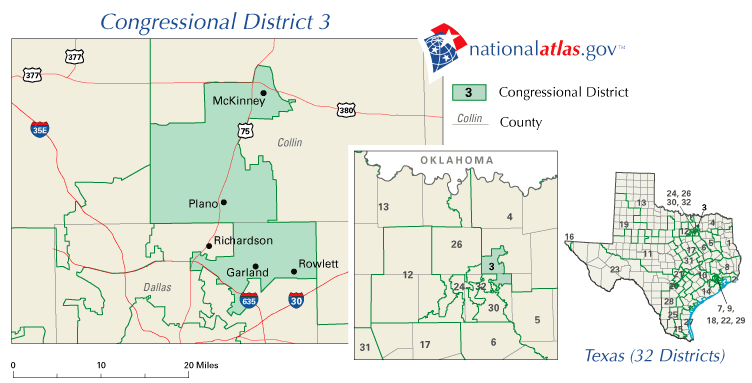

Republican candidate Sam Johnson had been the incumbent since 1991. In 2010, Johnson faced Independent Emma Berry, Democrat John Lingenfelder and Libertarian Christopher J. Claytor.

Predictions

Source	Ranking	As of
The Cook Political Report	Safe R	November 1, 2010
Rothenberg	Safe R	November 1, 2010
Sabato's Crystal Ball	Safe R	November 1, 2010
RCP	Safe R	November 1, 2010
CQ Politics	Safe R	October 28, 2010
New York Times	Safe R	November 1, 2010
FiveThirtyEight	Safe R	November 1, 2010

General election results

Texas's 3rd congressional district, 2010
Party	Candidate	Votes	%
Republican	Sam Johnson	101,180	66.28
Democratic	John Lingenfelder	47,848	31.34
Libertarian	Christopher J. Claytor	3,602	2.36
Write-in	Harry Pierce	22	0.01
Total votes		152,652	100
Republican hold			

== District 4 ==
2010 Texas's 4th congressional district election
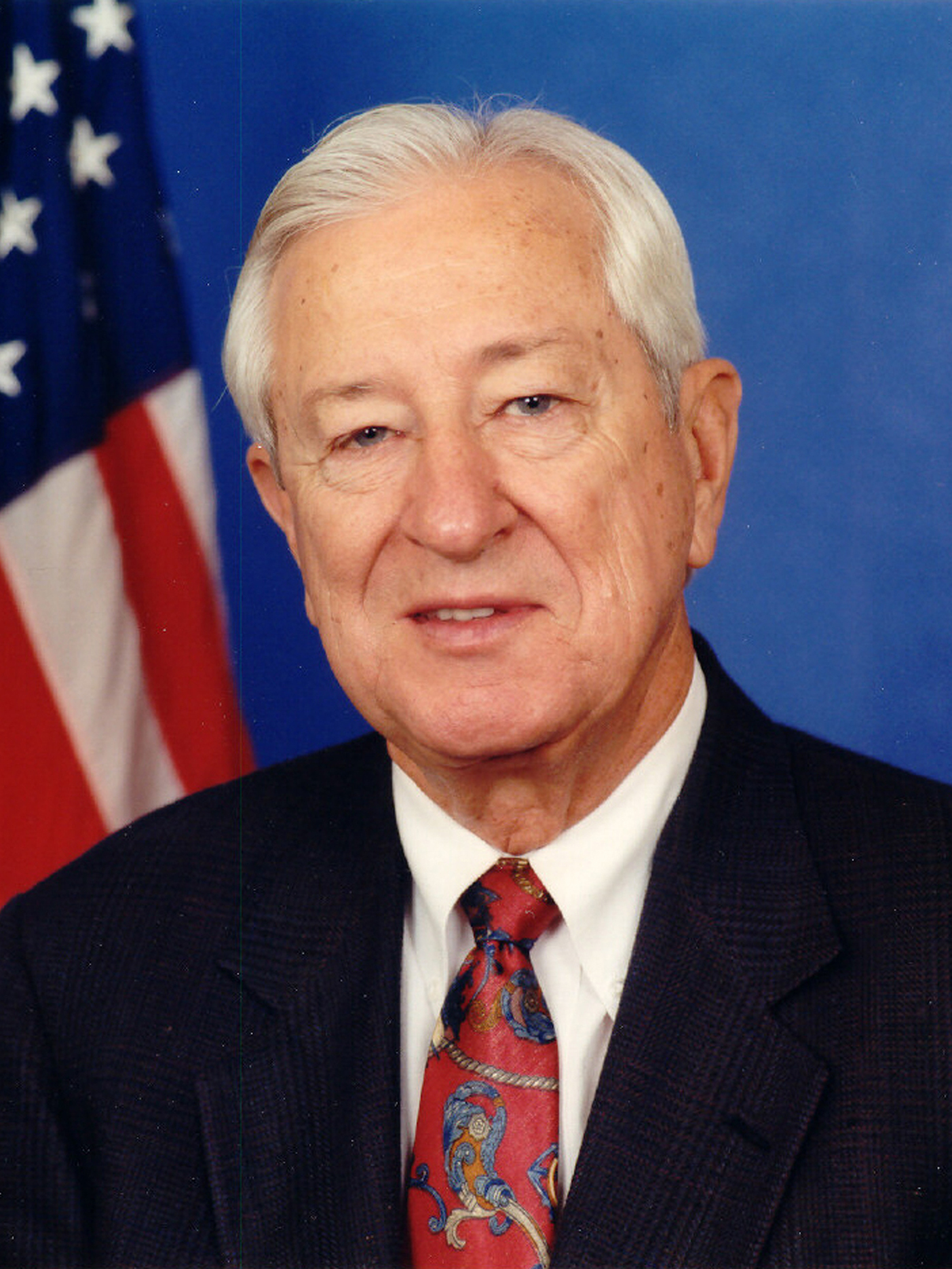

Nominee	Ralph M. Hall	VaLinda Hathcox
Party	Republican	Democratic
Popular vote	136,338	40,975
Percentage	73.2%	22.0%
- County results Hall: 50–60% 60–70% 70–80% 80–90%
U.S. Representative before election
Ralph M. Hall
Republican
Elected U.S. Representative
Ralph M. Hall
Republican

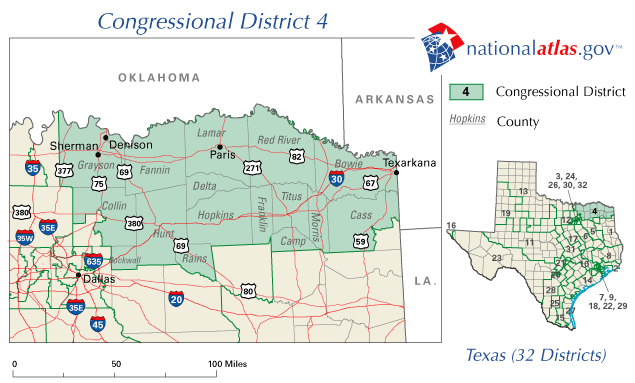

Republican Ralph Hall, at the time the oldest living member of the House of Representatives, had represented the district since 1980. In 2008, Hall won re-election with 68.8%. In 2010, he won the primary with 57% of the vote, and faced a re-election campaign against Democratic attorney VaLinda Hathcox.

Predictions

Source	Ranking	As of
The Cook Political Report	Safe R	November 1, 2010
Rothenberg	Safe R	November 1, 2010
Sabato's Crystal Ball	Safe R	November 1, 2010
RCP	Safe R	November 1, 2010
CQ Politics	Safe R	October 28, 2010
New York Times	Safe R	November 1, 2010
FiveThirtyEight	Safe R	November 1, 2010

General election results

Texas's 4th congressional district, 2010
Party	Candidate	Votes	%
Republican	Ralph M. Hall	136,338	73.19
Democratic	VaLinda Hathcox	40,975	22.00
Libertarian	Jim D. Prindle	4,729	2.54
Independent	Shane Shepard	4,244	2.28
Total votes		186,286	100
Republican hold			

== District 5 ==
2010 Texas's 5th congressional district election
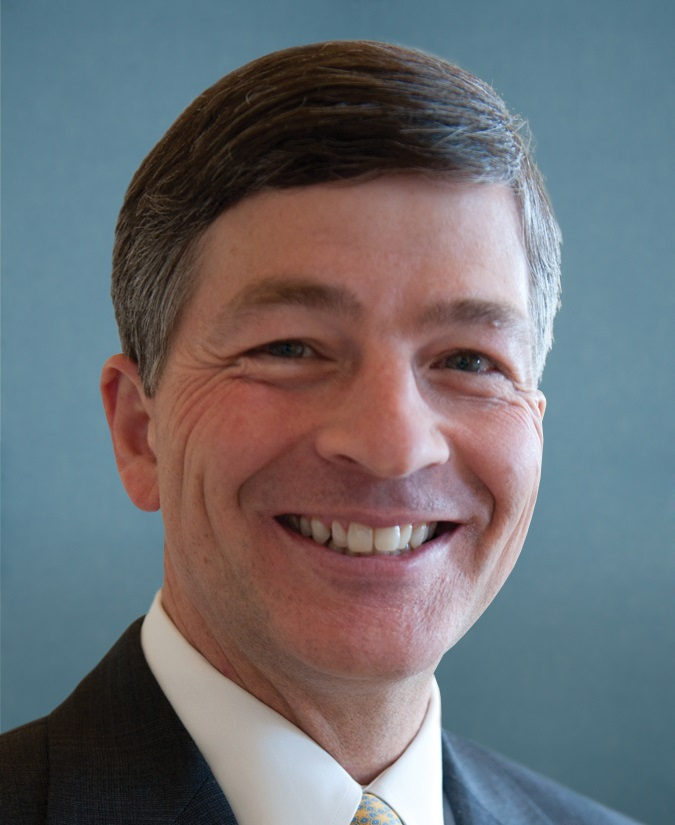

Nominee	Jeb Hensarling	Tom Berry
Party	Republican	Democratic
Popular vote	106,742	41,649
Percentage	70.5%	27.5%
- County results Hensarling: 60–70% 70–80% 80–90%
U.S. Representative before election
Kay Bailey Hutchison
Republican
Elected U.S. Representative
Jeb Hensarling
Republican

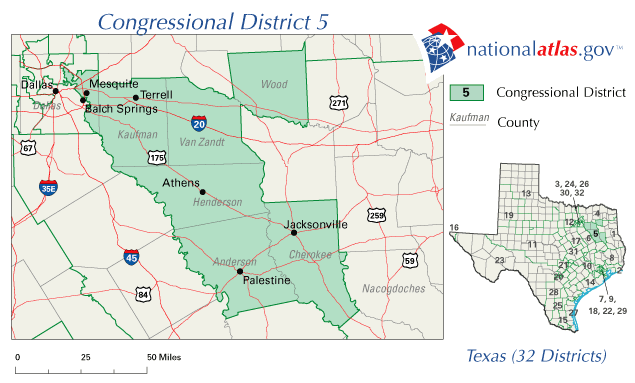

Republican Jeb Hensarling was first elected in 2002 to a heavily Republican district. A favorite among fiscal conservatives in Texas, Hensarling was considered a potential challenger for the U.S. Senate in 2012 when the incumbent Republican Kay Bailey Hutchison retired. In 2008, Hensarling was re-elected with 83.6% of the vote. In 2010, he went unopposed in the primary and faced Democratic activist Tom Berry in the general election.

Predictions

Source	Ranking	As of
The Cook Political Report	Safe R	November 1, 2010
Rothenberg	Safe R	November 1, 2010
Sabato's Crystal Ball	Safe R	November 1, 2010
RCP	Safe R	November 1, 2010
CQ Politics	Safe R	October 28, 2010
New York Times	Safe R	November 1, 2010
FiveThirtyEight	Safe R	November 1, 2010

General election results

Texas's 5th congressional district, 2010
Party	Candidate	Votes	%
Republican	Jeb Hensarling	106,742	70.53
Democratic	Tom Berry	41,649	27.52
Libertarian	Ken Ashby	2,958	1.95
Total votes		151,349	100
Republican hold			

== District 6 ==
2010 Texas's 6th congressional district election
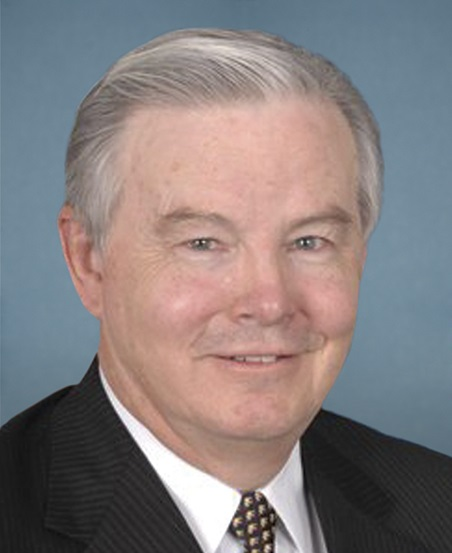

Nominee	Joe L. Barton	David E. Cozad
Party	Republican	Democratic
Popular vote	107,140	50,717
Percentage	65.9%	31.2%
- County results Barton: 60–70% 70–80% 80–90%
U.S. Representative before election
Joe Barton
Republican
Elected U.S. Representative
Joe L. Barton
Republican

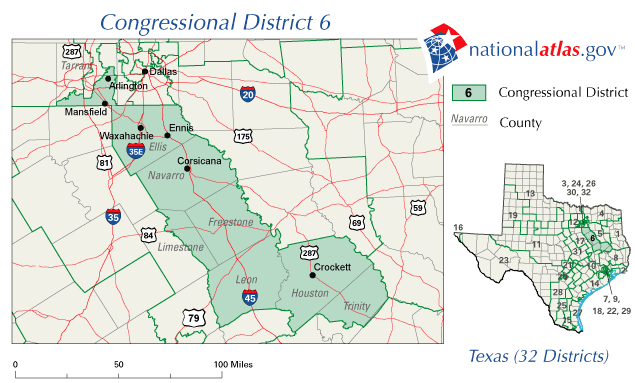

Twelve-term Republican Joe Barton was the chair of the House Energy and Commerce Committee until Democrats took over the House in 2006. In 2008, Barton won re-election with 62.0%. He faced Democratic activist David Cozad in the general election.

Predictions

Source	Ranking	As of
The Cook Political Report	Safe R	November 1, 2010
Rothenberg	Safe R	November 1, 2010
Sabato's Crystal Ball	Safe R	November 1, 2010
RCP	Safe R	November 1, 2010
CQ Politics	Safe R	October 28, 2010
New York Times	Safe R	November 1, 2010
FiveThirtyEight	Safe R	November 1, 2010

General election results

Texas's 6th congressional district, 2010
Party	Candidate	Votes	%
Republican	Joe L. Barton	107,140	65.91
Democratic	David E. Cozad	50,717	31.20
Libertarian	Byron Severns	4,700	2.89
Total votes		162,557	100
Republican hold			

== District 7 ==
2010 Texas's 7th congressional district election
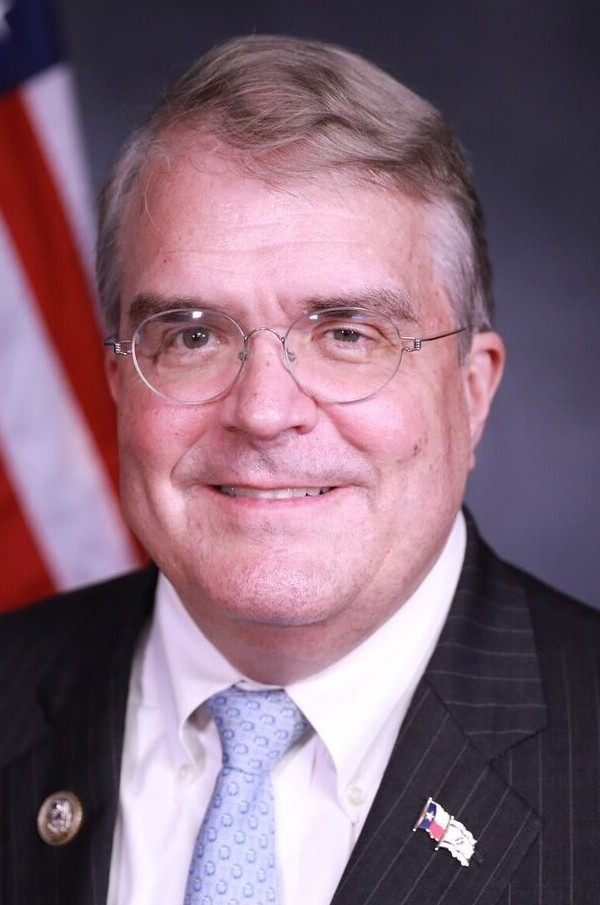

Nominee	John Culberson	Bob Townsend
Party	Republican	Libertarian
Popular vote	143,655	31,704
Percentage	81.5%	18.0%
- County results Culberson: 80–90%
U.S. Representative before election
John Culberson
Republican
Elected U.S. Representative
John Culberson
Republican

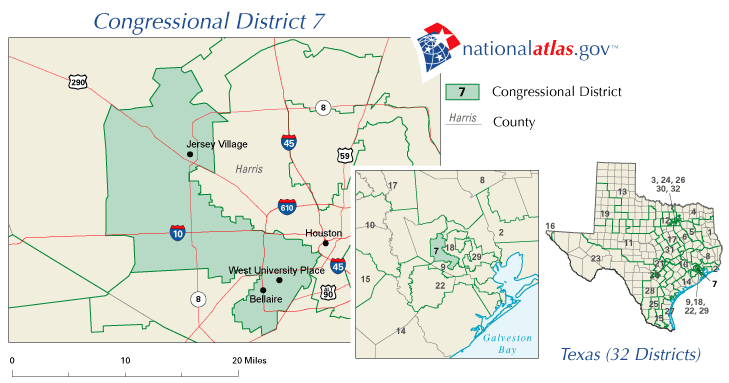

Republican John Culberson was unopposed in the general election.

Predictions

Source	Ranking	As of
The Cook Political Report	Safe R	November 1, 2010
Rothenberg	Safe R	November 1, 2010
Sabato's Crystal Ball	Safe R	November 1, 2010
RCP	Safe R	November 1, 2010
CQ Politics	Safe R	October 28, 2010
New York Times	Safe R	November 1, 2010
FiveThirtyEight	Safe R	November 1, 2010

General election results

Texas's 7th congressional district, 2010
Party	Candidate	Votes	%
Republican	John Culberson	143,655	81.45
Libertarian	Bob Townsend	31,704	17.98
Write-in	Lissa Squiers	1,019	0.58
Total votes		176,378	100
Republican hold			

== District 8 ==
2010 Texas's 8th congressional district election
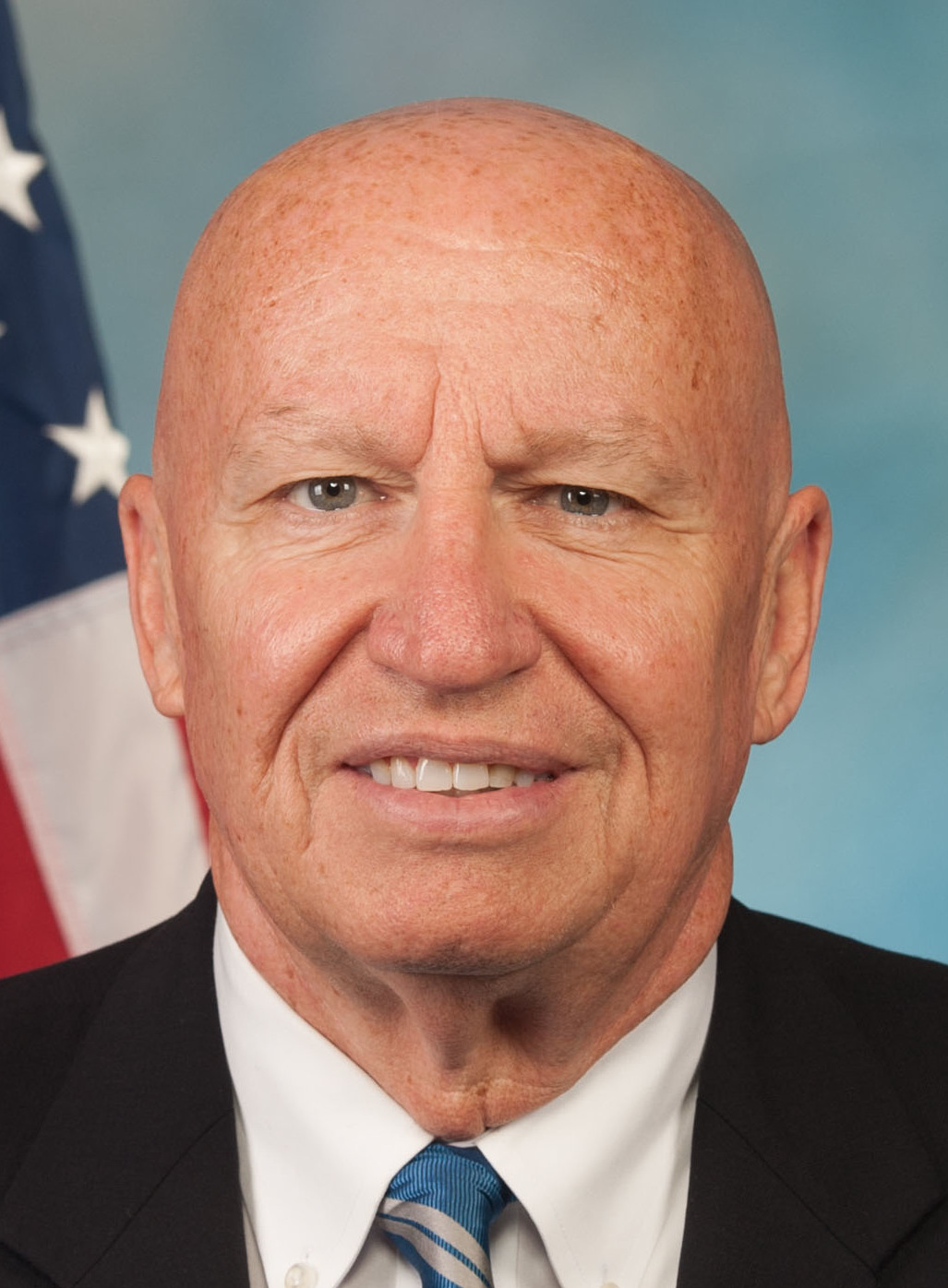

Nominee	Kevin Brady	Kent Hargett
Party	Republican	Democratic
Popular vote	161,417	34,694
Percentage	80.3%	17.3%
- County results Brady: 60–70% 70–80% 80–90% 90–100%
U.S. Representative before election
Kevin Brady
Republican
Elected U.S. Representative
Kevin Brady
Republican

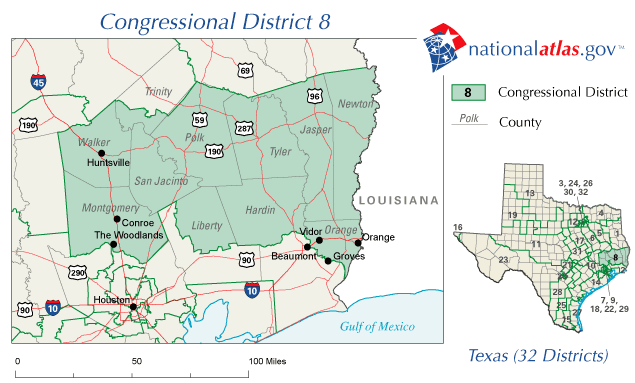

Republican Kevin Brady represented a strongly GOP district. He won re-election in 2008 with 72.6%. In 2010, he faced Libertarian Bruce West, a design engineer and 2-time Democratic congressional candidate Kent Hargett in the general election.

Predictions

Source	Ranking	As of
The Cook Political Report	Safe R	November 1, 2010
Rothenberg	Safe R	November 1, 2010
Sabato's Crystal Ball	Safe R	November 1, 2010
RCP	Safe R	November 1, 2010
CQ Politics	Safe R	October 28, 2010
New York Times	Safe R	November 1, 2010
FiveThirtyEight	Safe R	November 1, 2010

General election results

Texas's 8th congressional district, 2010
Party	Candidate	Votes	%
Republican	Kevin Brady	161,417	80.27
Democratic	Kent Hargett	34,694	17.25
Libertarian	Bruce West	4,988	2.48
Total votes		201,099	100
Republican hold			

== District 9 ==
2010 Texas's 9th congressional district election
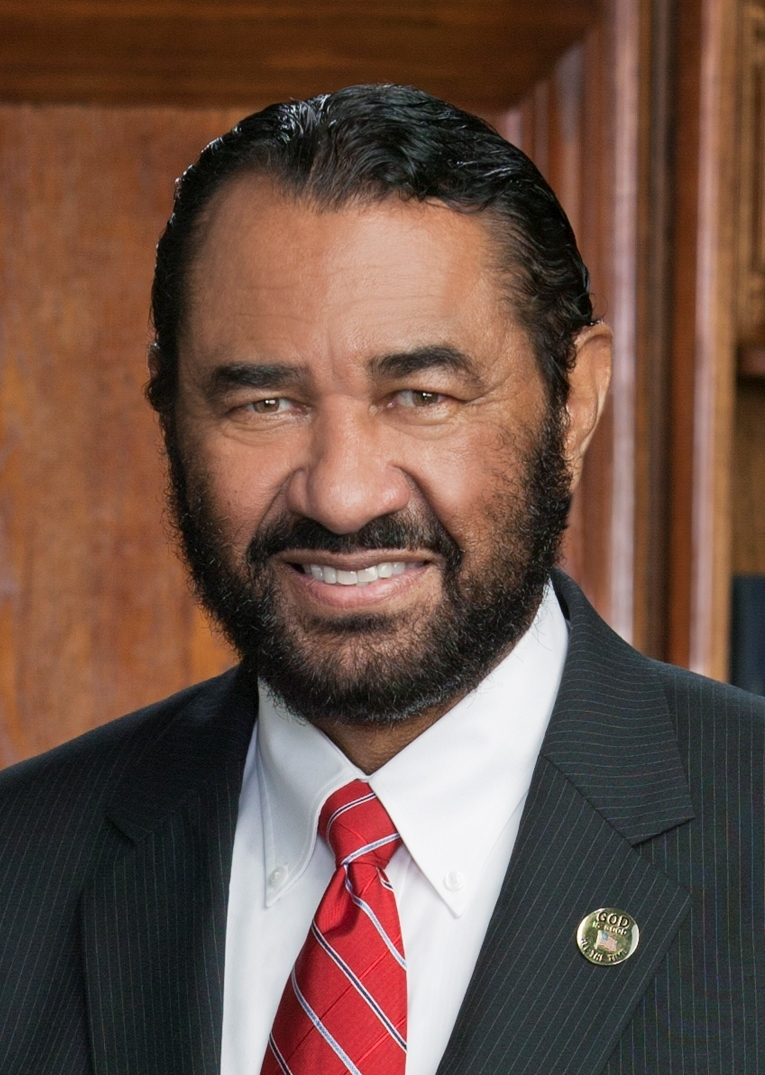

Nominee	Al Green	Steve Mueller
Party	Democratic	Republican
Popular vote	80,107	24,201
Percentage	75.7%	22.9%
- County results Green: 70–80% 80–90%
U.S. Representative before election
Al Green
Democratic
Elected U.S. Representative
Al Green
Democratic

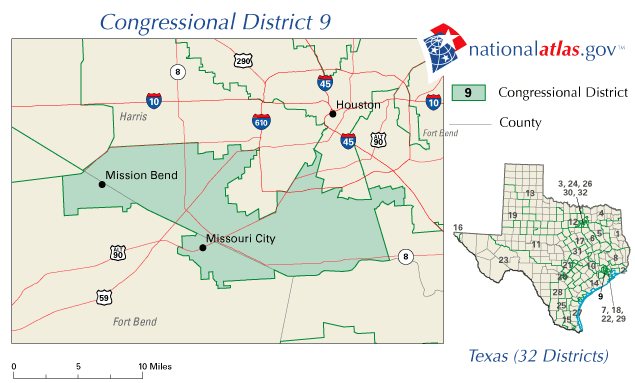

Democrat Al Green was re-elected with 94% in 2008. Republican activist Steve Mueller faced Green in the general election.

Predictions

Source	Ranking	As of
The Cook Political Report	Safe D	November 1, 2010
Rothenberg	Safe D	November 1, 2010
Sabato's Crystal Ball	Safe D	November 1, 2010
RCP	Safe D	November 1, 2010
CQ Politics	Safe D	October 28, 2010
New York Times	Safe D	November 1, 2010
FiveThirtyEight	Safe D	November 1, 2010

General election results

Texas's 9th congressional district, 2010
Party	Candidate	Votes	%
Democratic	Al Green	80,107	75.74
Republican	Steve Mueller	24,201	22.88
Libertarian	Michael W. Hope	1,459	1.38
Total votes		105,767	100
Democratic hold			

== District 10 ==
2010 Texas's 10th congressional district election
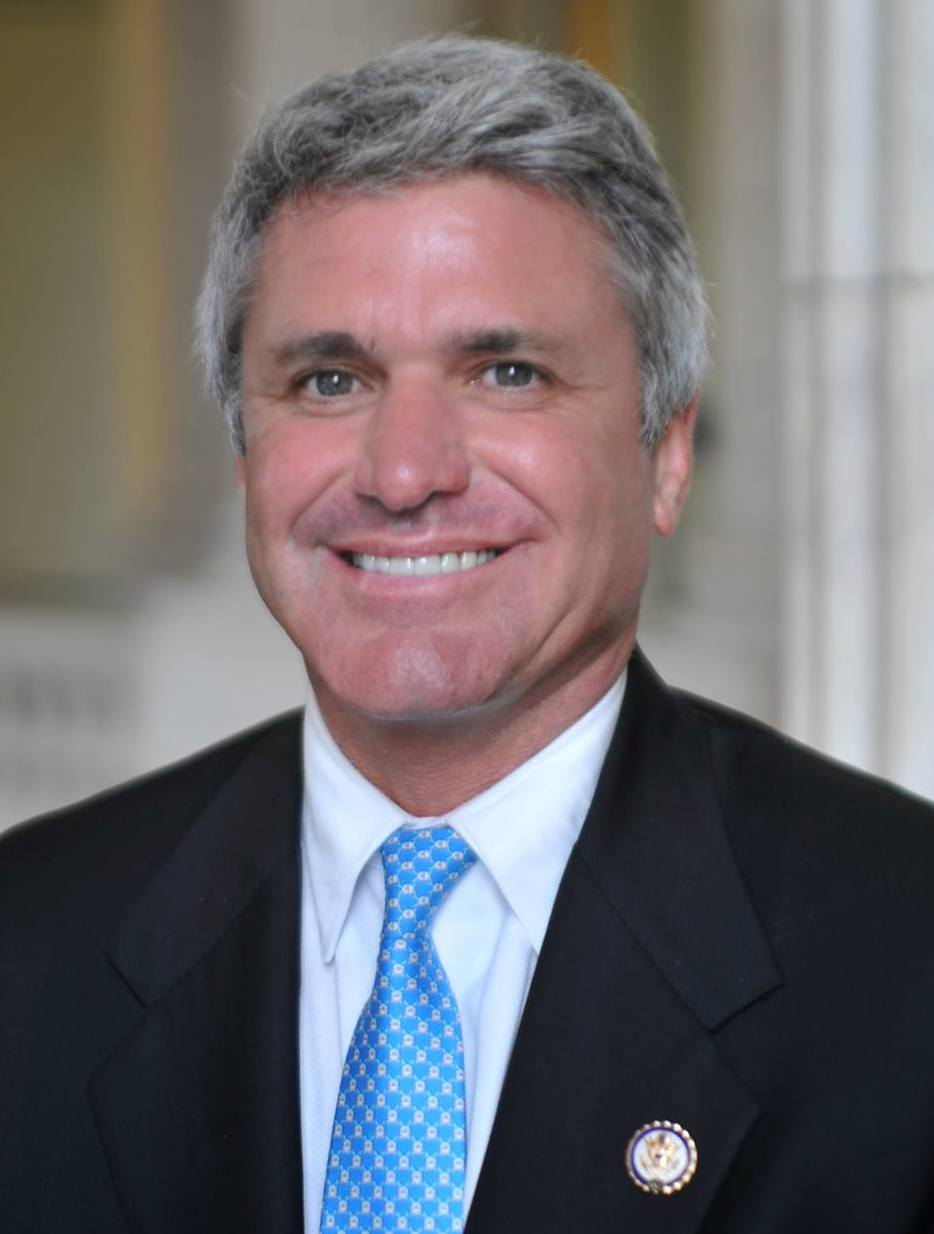

Nominee	Michael McCaul	Ted Ankrum
Party	Republican	Democratic
Popular vote	144,980	74,086
Percentage	64.7%	33.0%
- County results Mccaul: 50–60% 60–70% 70–80% 80–90% Ankrum: 50–60%
U.S. Representative before election
Michael McCaul
Republican
Elected U.S. Representative
Michael McCaul
Republican

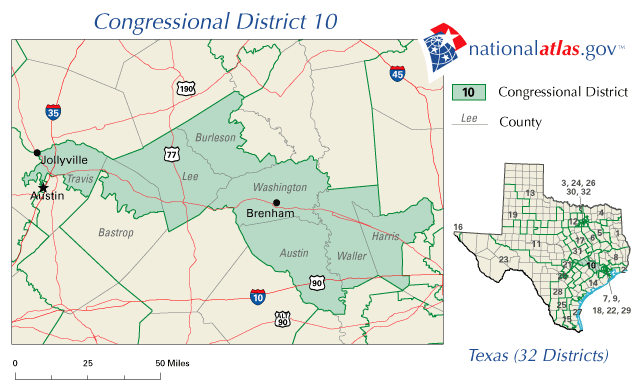

Republican Michael McCaul ran for reelection in 2010. He defeated Democratic nominee, war veteran Ted Ankrum in the general election.

Predictions

Source	Ranking	As of
The Cook Political Report	Safe R	November 1, 2010
Rothenberg	Safe R	November 1, 2010
Sabato's Crystal Ball	Safe R	November 1, 2010
RCP	Safe R	November 1, 2010
CQ Politics	Safe R	October 28, 2010
New York Times	Safe R	November 1, 2010
FiveThirtyEight	Safe R	November 1, 2010

General election results

Texas's 10th congressional district, 2010
Party	Candidate	Votes	%
Republican	Michael McCaul	144,980	64.67
Democratic	Ted Ankrum	74,086	33.05
Libertarian	Jeremiah "JP" Perkins	5,105	2.28
Total votes		224,171	100
Republican hold			

== District 11 ==
2010 Texas's 11th congressional district election
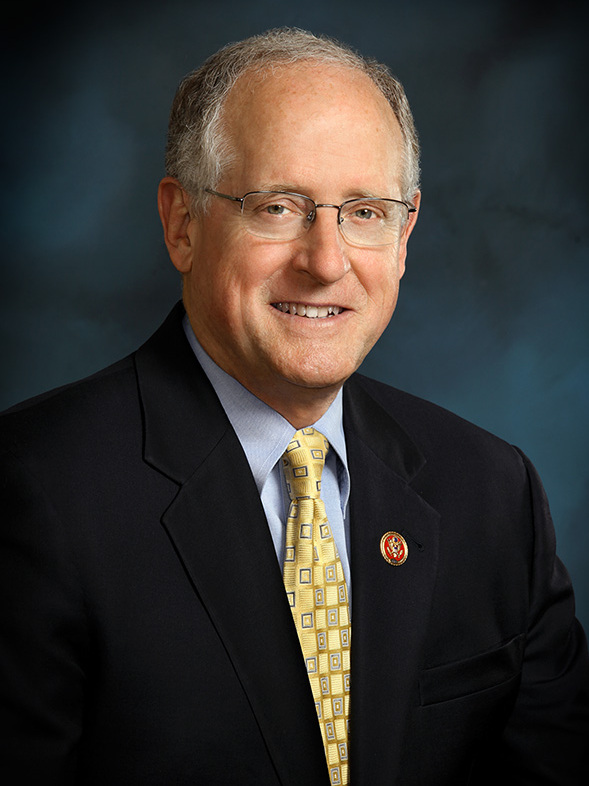

Nominee	Mike Conaway	James Quillian
Party	Republican	Democratic
Popular vote	125,581	23,989
Percentage	80.8%	15.4%
- County results Conaway: 60–70% 70–80% 80–90% 90–100%
U.S. Representative before election
Mike Conaway
Republican
Elected U.S. Representative
Mike Conaway
Republican

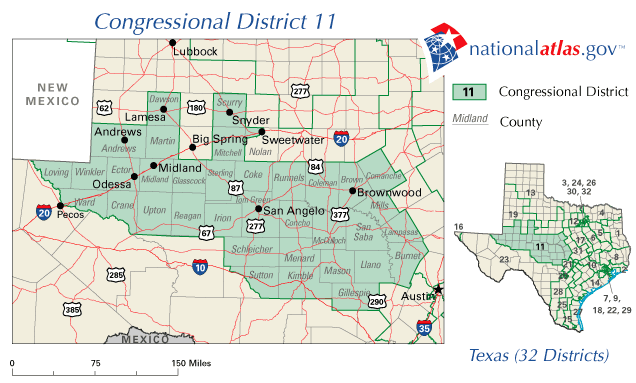

Republican Mike Conaway represented George W. Bush’s strongest district in the 2004 election. He won 77% of the vote in 2004 and was one of only a handful of Republicans who ran unopposed in 2006. In 2008, he won re-election with 88.3%. In 2010, he faced Democratic activist James Quillian in the general election.

Predictions

Source	Ranking	As of
The Cook Political Report	Safe R	November 1, 2010
Rothenberg	Safe R	November 1, 2010
Sabato's Crystal Ball	Safe R	November 1, 2010
RCP	Safe R	November 1, 2010
CQ Politics	Safe R	October 28, 2010
New York Times	Safe R	November 1, 2010
FiveThirtyEight	Safe R	November 1, 2010

General election results

Texas's 11th congressional district, 2010
Party	Candidate	Votes	%
Republican	Mike Conaway	125,581	80.84
Democratic	James Quillian	23,989	15.44
Libertarian	James A. Powell	4,321	2.78
Green	Jim Howe	1,449	0.93
Total votes		155,340	100
Republican hold			

== District 12 ==
2010 Texas's 12th congressional district election
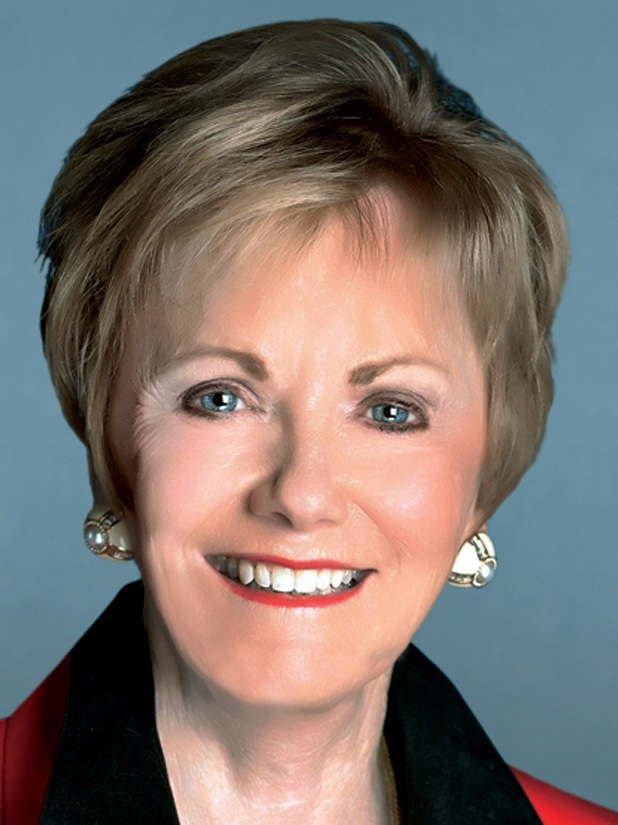

Nominee	Kay Granger	Tracey Smith
Party	Republican	Democratic
Popular vote	109,882	38,434
Percentage	71.9%	25.1%
- County results Granger: 60–70% 80–90%
U.S. Representative before election
Kay Granger
Republican
Elected U.S. Representative
Kay Granger
Republican

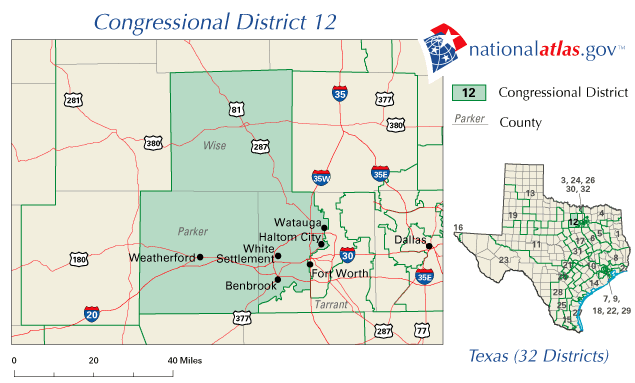

Republican Kay Granger won re-election in 2008 with 67.6%. In 2010, she won the primary with 70%, and faced Democratic activist Tracey Smith in the general election.

Predictions

Source	Ranking	As of
The Cook Political Report	Safe R	November 1, 2010
Rothenberg	Safe R	November 1, 2010
Sabato's Crystal Ball	Safe R	November 1, 2010
RCP	Safe R	November 1, 2010
CQ Politics	Safe R	October 28, 2010
New York Times	Safe R	November 1, 2010
FiveThirtyEight	Safe R	November 1, 2010

General election results

Texas's 12th congressional district, 2010
Party	Candidate	Votes	%
Republican	Kay Granger	109,882	71.86
Democratic	Tracey Smith	38,434	25.13
Libertarian	Matthew Solodow	4,601	3.01
Total votes		152,917	100
Republican hold			

== District 13 ==
2010 Texas's 13th congressional district election
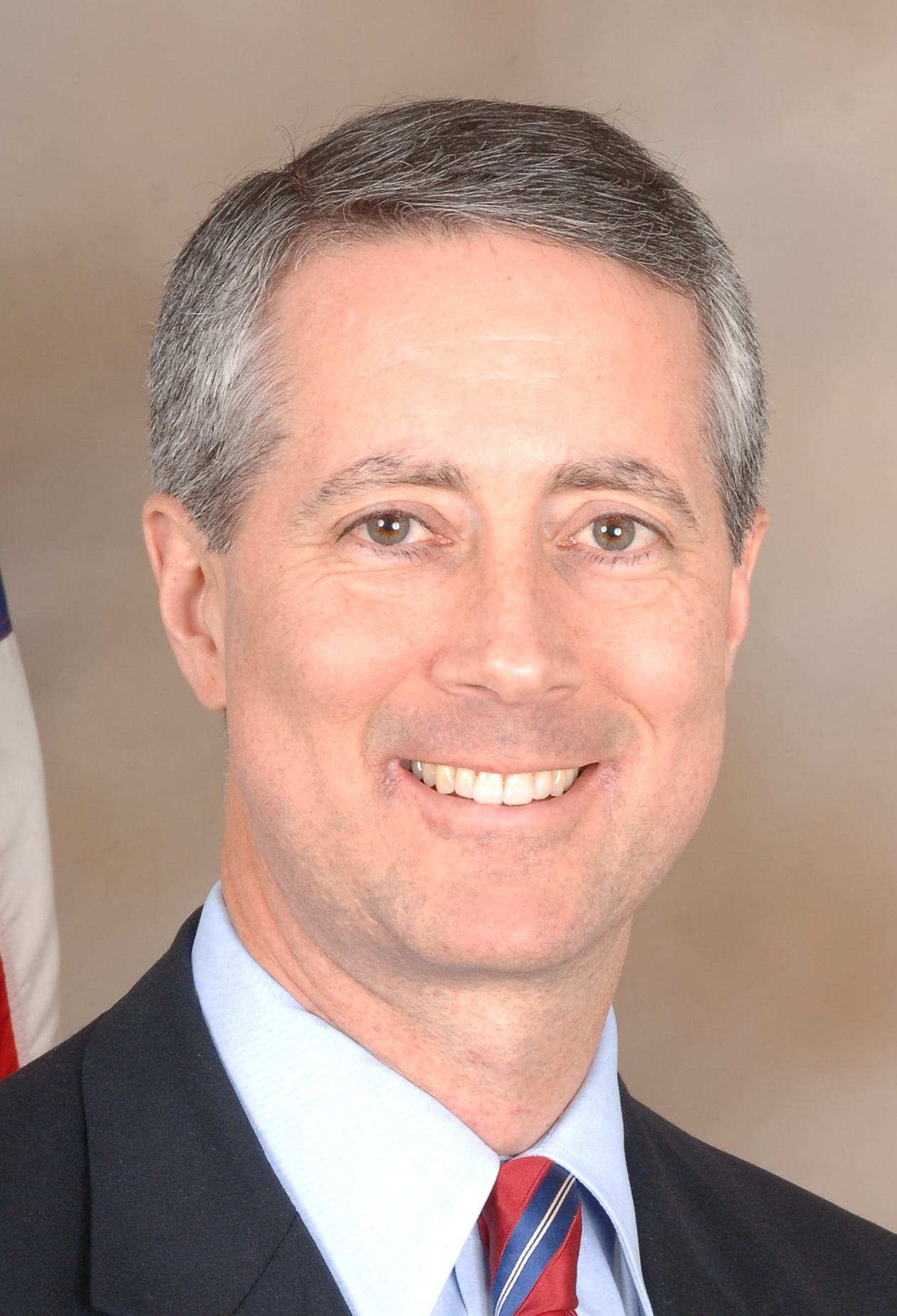

Nominee	Mac Thornberry	Keith Dyer
Party	Republican	Independent
Popular vote	113,201	11,192
Percentage	87.0%	8.6%
- County results Thornberry: 80–90% 90–100%
U.S. Representative before election
Mac Thornberry
Republican
Elected U.S. Representative
Mac Thornberry
Republican

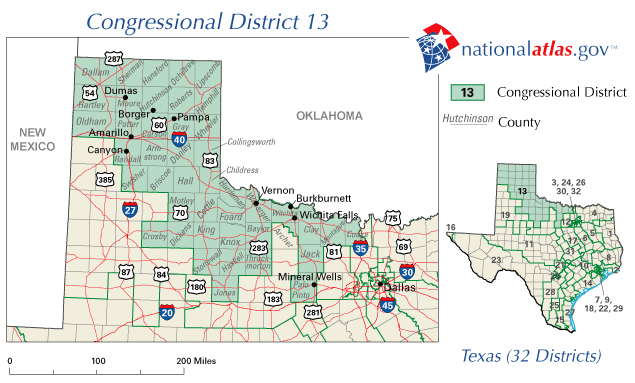

Republican Mac Thornberry ran for re-election.

Predictions

Source	Ranking	As of
The Cook Political Report	Safe R	November 1, 2010
Rothenberg	Safe R	November 1, 2010
Sabato's Crystal Ball	Safe R	November 1, 2010
RCP	Safe R	November 1, 2010
CQ Politics	Safe R	October 28, 2010
New York Times	Safe R	November 1, 2010
FiveThirtyEight	Safe R	November 1, 2010

General election results

Texas's 13th congressional district, 2010
Party	Candidate	Votes	%
Republican	Mac Thornberry	113,201	87.05
Independent	Keith Dyer	11,192	8.61
Libertarian	John T. Burwell Jr.	5,650	4.34
Total votes		130,043	100
Republican hold			

== District 14 ==
2010 Texas's 14th congressional district election
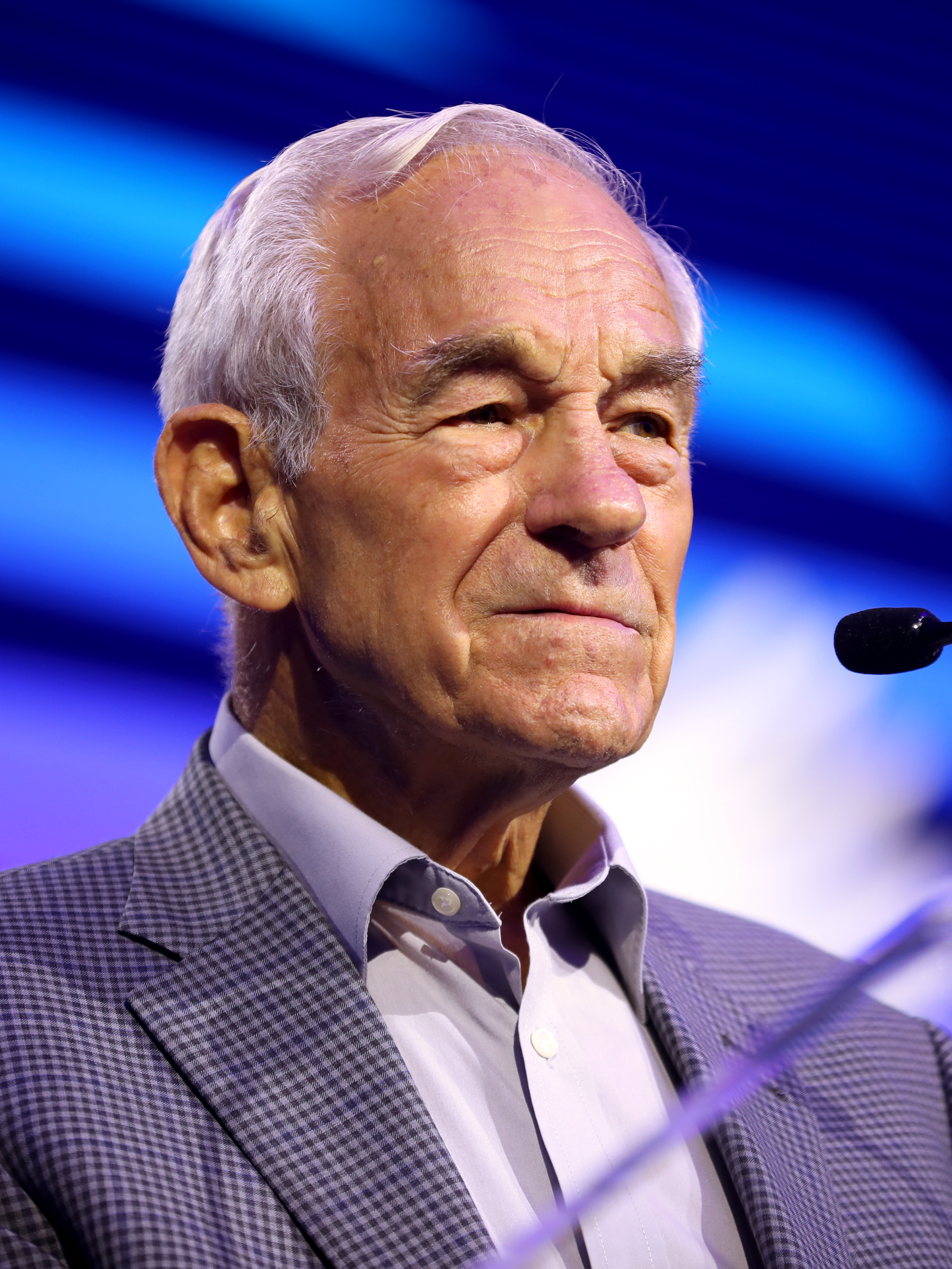

Nominee	Ron Paul	Robert Pruett
Party	Republican	Democratic
Popular vote	140,623	44,431
Percentage	76.0%	24.0%
- County results Paul: 70–80% 80–90%
U.S. Representative before election
Ron Paul
Republican
Elected U.S. Representative
Ron Paul
Republican

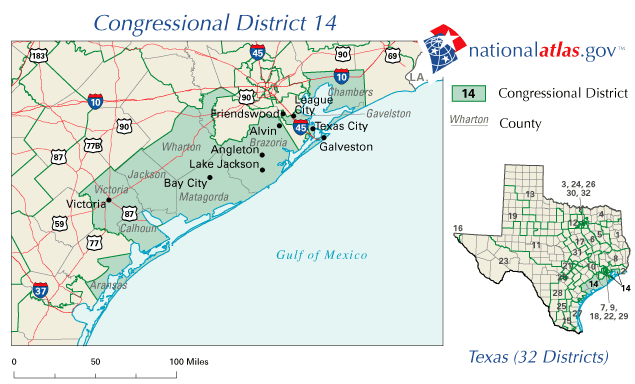

Republican Ron Paul is best known for his strong libertarian views. In 2010, he won the primary with 80% of the vote. In the Democratic primary, Robert Pruett won the run off election with just 52% of the vote, and faced Paul in the general election.

Predictions

Source	Ranking	As of
The Cook Political Report	Safe R	November 1, 2010
Rothenberg	Safe R	November 1, 2010
Sabato's Crystal Ball	Safe R	November 1, 2010
RCP	Safe R	November 1, 2010
CQ Politics	Safe R	October 28, 2010
New York Times	Safe R	November 1, 2010
FiveThirtyEight	Safe R	November 1, 2010

General election results

Texas's 14th congressional district, 2010
Party	Candidate	Votes	%
Republican	Ron Paul	140,623	75.99
Democratic	Robert Pruett	44,431	24.01
Total votes		185,054	100
Republican hold			

Campaign finance report

Candidate (party)	Receipts	Disbursements	Cash on hand	Debt
Ron Paul (R)	$851,353	$1,154,112	$2,197,619	$0
Robert Pruett (D)	$19,421	$18,255	$1,166	$4,531
Eugene Flynn (L)	Unreported			

== District 15 ==
2010 Texas's 15th congressional district election

Nominee	Ruben Hinojosa	Eddie Zamora
Party	Democratic	Republican
Popular vote	53,546	39,964
Percentage	55.7%	41.6%
- County results Zamora: 50–60% 60–70% 70–80% Hinojosa: 50–60% 60–70% 70–80%
U.S. Representative before election
Rubén Hinojosa
Democratic
Elected U.S. Representative
Ruben Hinojosa
Democratic

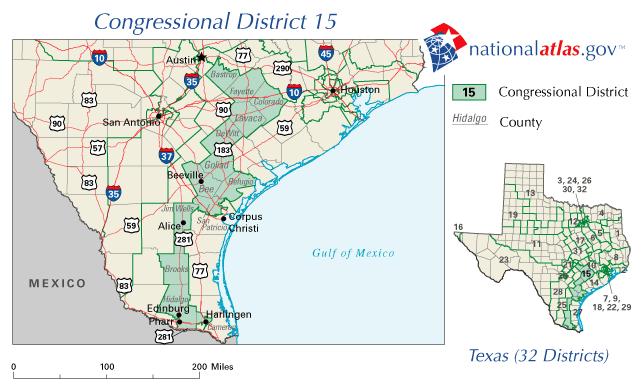

Democrat Rubén Hinojosa was re-elected with 62% in 2004 and 66% in 2008. In 2010, the Republican primary had a run off between Eddie Zamora and Paul Haring. Zamora won the run off with 57% of the vote and faced Hinojosa in the general election.

Predictions

Source	Ranking	As of
The Cook Political Report	Safe D	November 1, 2010
Rothenberg	Safe D	November 1, 2010
Sabato's Crystal Ball	Safe D	November 1, 2010
RCP	Likely D	November 1, 2010
CQ Politics	Safe D	October 28, 2010
New York Times	Safe D	November 1, 2010
FiveThirtyEight	Safe D	November 1, 2010

General election results

Texas's 15th congressional district, 2010
Party	Candidate	Votes	%
Democratic	Ruben Hinojosa	53,546	55.73
Republican	Eddie Zamora	39,964	41.59
Libertarian	Aaron I. Cohn	2,570	2.67
Total votes		96,080	100
Democratic hold			

== District 16 ==
2010 Texas's 16th congressional district election
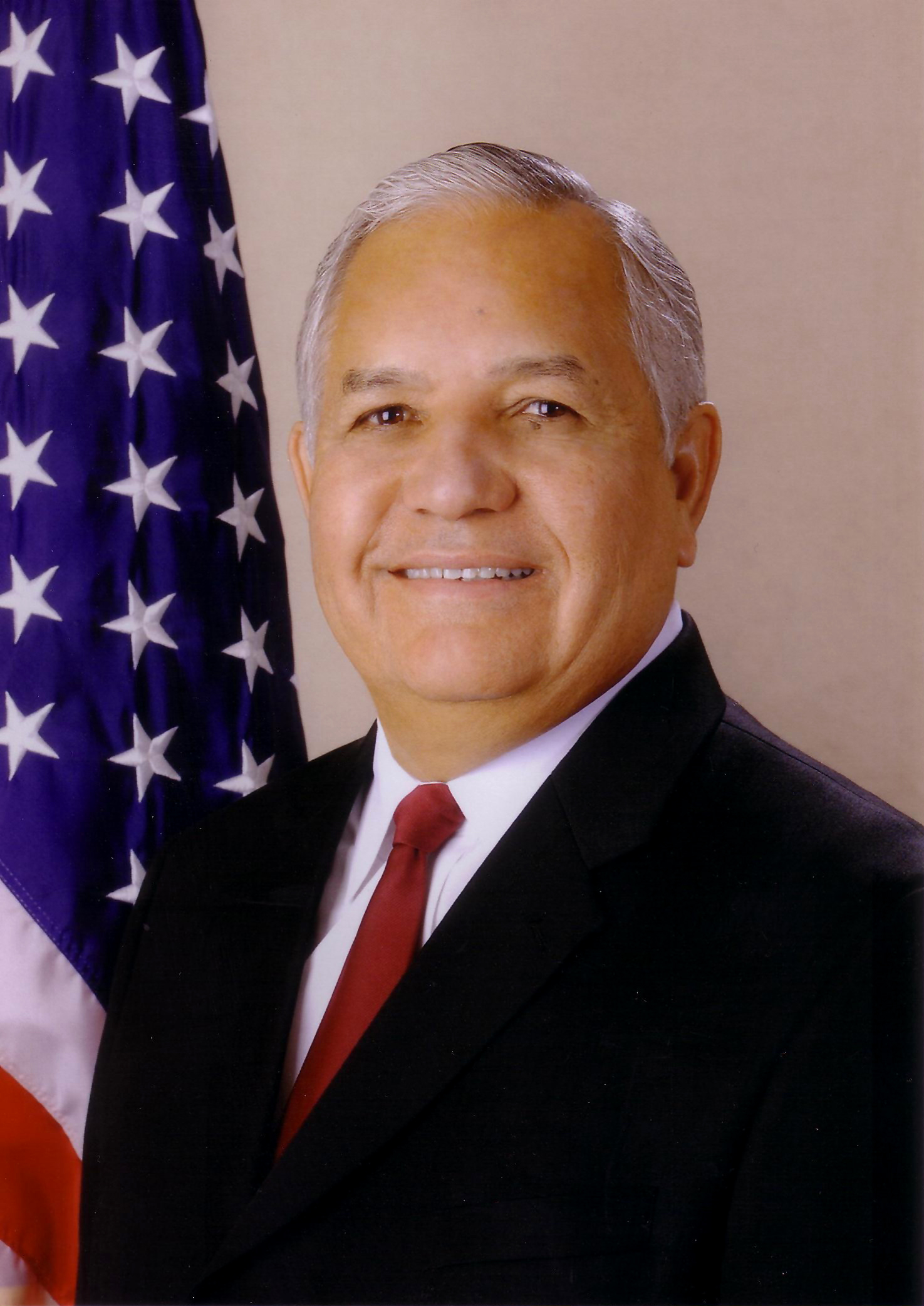

Nominee	Silvestre Reyes	Tim Besco	Bill Collins
Party	Democratic	Republican	Libertarian
Popular vote	49,301	31,051	4,319
Percentage	58.1%	36.6%	5.1%
- County results Reyes: 50–60%
U.S. Representative before election
Silvestre Reyes
Democratic
Elected U.S. Representative
Silvestre Reyes
Democratic

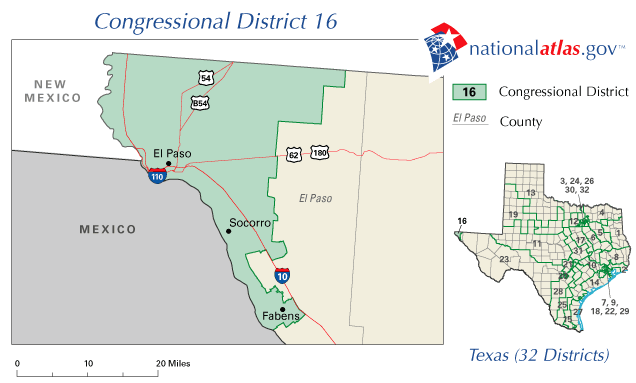

Democrat Silvestre Reyes was the Chairman of the Permanent Select Committee on Intelligence. Reyes won re-election in 2008 with 82%. In 2010, he faced Republican navy veteran Tim Besco.

Predictions

Source	Ranking	As of
The Cook Political Report	Safe D	November 1, 2010
Rothenberg	Safe D	November 1, 2010
Sabato's Crystal Ball	Safe D	November 1, 2010
RCP	Safe D	November 1, 2010
CQ Politics	Safe D	October 28, 2010
New York Times	Safe D	November 1, 2010
FiveThirtyEight	Safe D	November 1, 2010

General election results

Texas's 16th congressional district, 2010
Party	Candidate	Votes	%
Democratic	Silvestre Reyes	49,301	58.07
Republican	Tim Besco	31,051	36.58
Libertarian	Bill Collins	4,319	5.09
Write-in	Tim Collins	221	0.26
Total votes		84,892	100
Democratic hold			

== District 17 ==
2010 Texas's 17th congressional district election
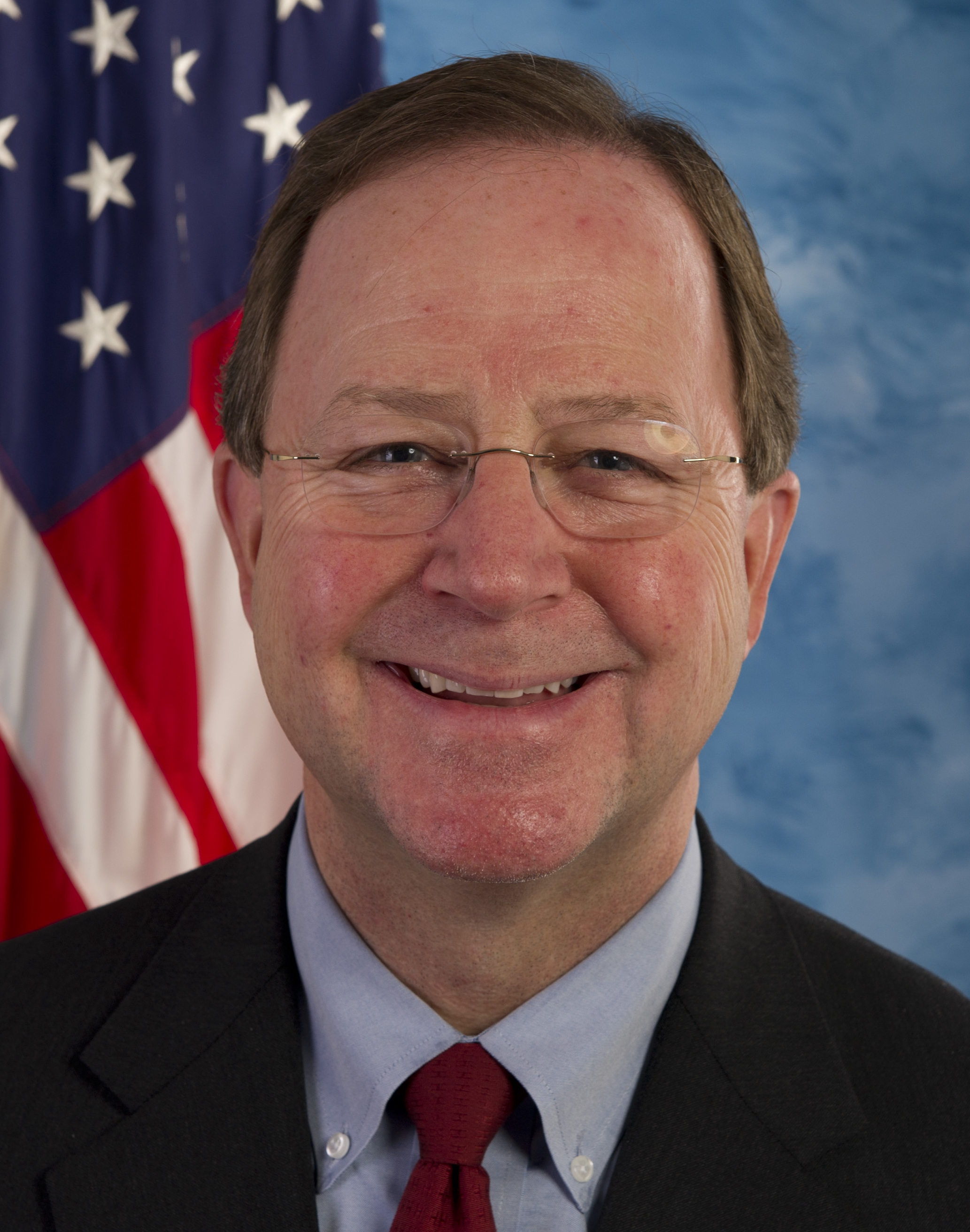

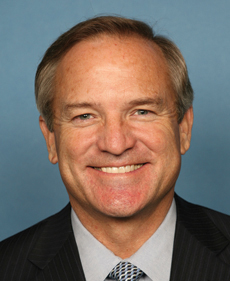
Nominee	Bill Flores	Chet Edwards
Party	Republican	Democratic
Popular vote	106,696	63,138
Percentage	61.8%	36.6%
- County results Flores: 50–60% 60–70% 70–80% Edwards: 50–60%
U.S. Representative before election
Chet Edwards
Democratic
Elected U.S. Representative
Pete Flores
Republican

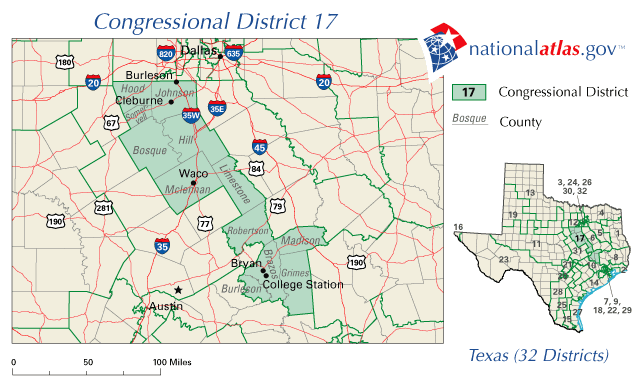

Democratic incumbent Chet Edwards was challenged by Republican nominee Bill Flores and Libertarian nominee Richard B. Kelly.

In 2008, Edwards was reelected with 53% to Republican small business owner Rob Curnock, who was overwhelmingly outspent. Edwards was a moderate Democrat, who represented one of the most conservative districts in the nation. In 2010, he went uncontested in the Democratic primary. In the Republican primary, Curnock qualified for a run off election against Flores. Flores won the run off with 64% of the vote.

Endorsements

The Dallas Morning News and the Fort Worth Star-Telegram both endorsed Edwards prior to the 2010 general election.

Polling

Poll source	Dates administered	Chet Edwards (D)	Bill Flores (R)
OnMessage, Inc.	May, 2010	41%	53%
Bennett, Petts & Normington	October 4–5, 2010	42%	46%
Penn, Schoen & Berland	October 19–21, 2010	40%	52%

Predictions

Source	Ranking	As of
The Cook Political Report	Lean R (flip)	November 1, 2010
Rothenberg	Likely R (flip)	November 1, 2010
Sabato's Crystal Ball	Lean R (flip)	November 1, 2010
RCP	Likely R (flip)	November 1, 2010
CQ Politics	Likely R (flip)	October 28, 2010
New York Times	Lean R (flip)	November 1, 2010
FiveThirtyEight	Safe R (flip)	November 1, 2010

General election results Edwards's loss was the largest margin of defeat for an incumbent Democrat in the 2010 cycle.

Texas's 17th congressional district, 2010
Party	Candidate	Votes	%
Republican	Bill Flores	106,696	61.80
Democratic	Chet Edwards	63,138	36.57
Libertarian	Richard B. Kelly	2,808	1.63
Total votes		172,642	100
Republican gain from Democratic			

== District 18 ==
2010 Texas's 18th congressional district election
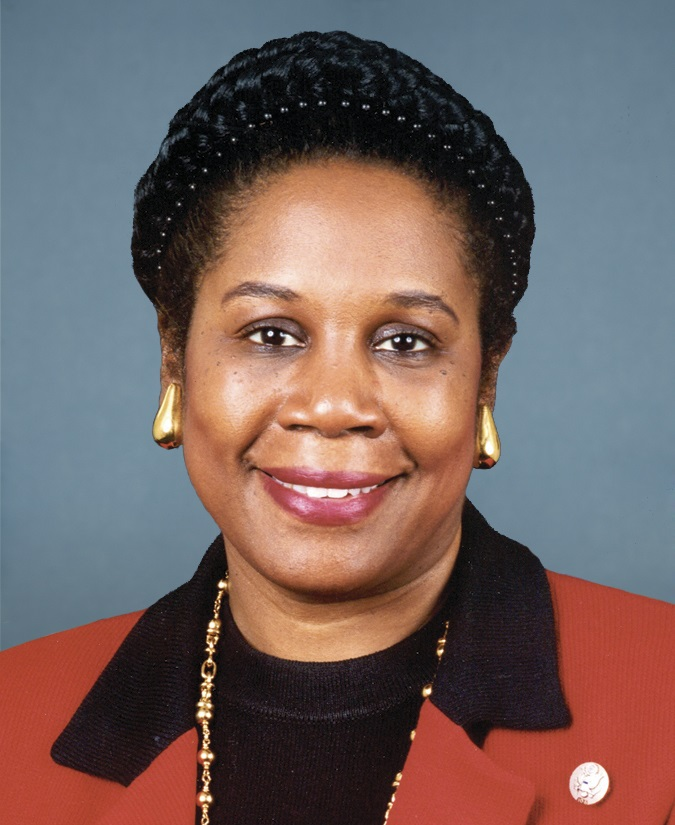

Nominee	Sheila Jackson Lee	John Faulk
Party	Democratic	Republican
Popular vote	85,108	33,067
Percentage	70.2%	27.3%
- County results Lee: 70–80%
U.S. Representative before election
Sheila Jackson Lee
Democratic
Elected U.S. Representative
Sheila Jackson Lee
Democratic

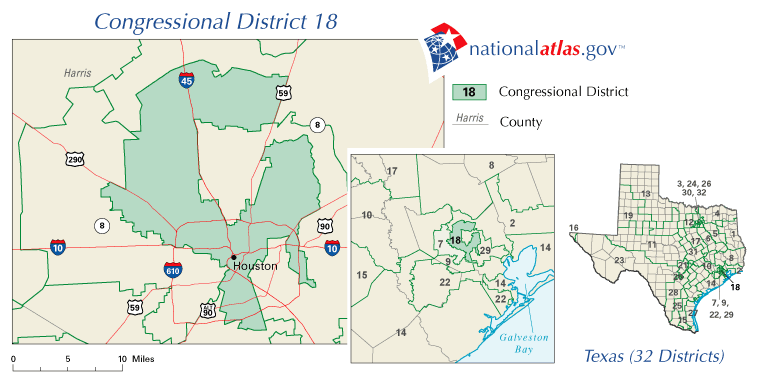

Democrat Sheila Jackson Lee represented one of the most heavily Democratic areas in the state. In 2008, she won re-election with 77% of the vote. Jackson Lee faced a challenge in the Democratic primary from Houston city councilor Jarvis Johnson, whom she defeated with 67% of the vote.

Predictions

Source	Ranking	As of
The Cook Political Report	Safe D	November 1, 2010
Rothenberg	Safe D	November 1, 2010
Sabato's Crystal Ball	Safe D	November 1, 2010
RCP	Safe D	November 1, 2010
CQ Politics	Safe D	October 28, 2010
New York Times	Safe D	November 1, 2010
FiveThirtyEight	Safe D	November 1, 2010

General election results

Texas's 18th congressional district, 2010
Party	Candidate	Votes	%
Democratic	Sheila Jackson Lee	85,108	70.15
Republican	John Faulk	33,067	27.26
Libertarian	Mike Taylor	3,118	2.57
Write-in	Charles B. "ChuckM" Meyer	28	0.02
Total votes		121,321	100
Democratic hold			

== District 19 ==
2010 Texas's 19th congressional district election
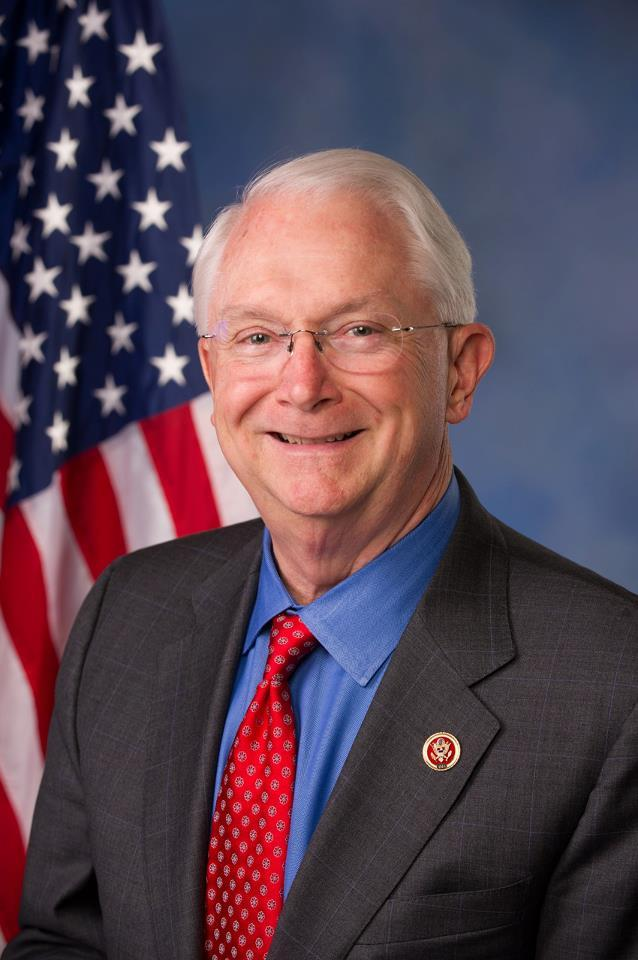

Nominee	Randy Neugebauer	Andy Wilson
Party	Republican	Democratic
Popular vote	106,059	25,984
Percentage	77.8%	19.1%
- County results Neugebauer: 60–70% 70–80% 80–90%
U.S. Representative before election
Randy Neugebauer
Republican
Elected U.S. Representative
Randy Neugebauer
Republican

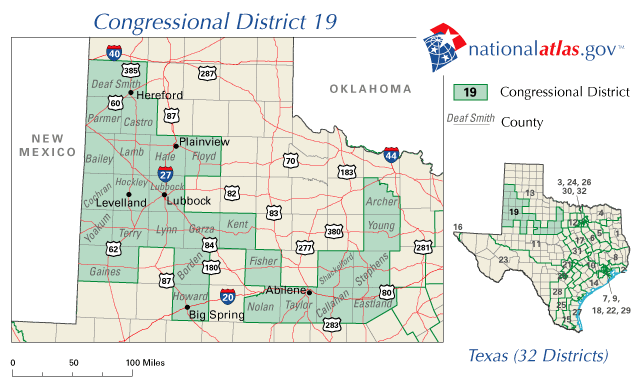

Republican Randy Neugebauer won re-election in 2006 with 68% and in 2008 with 72.5%. In 2010, he faced Democrat Andy Wilson and Libertarian Chip Peterson in the general election.

Predictions

Source	Ranking	As of
The Cook Political Report	Safe R	November 1, 2010
Rothenberg	Safe R	November 1, 2010
Sabato's Crystal Ball	Safe R	November 1, 2010
RCP	Safe R	November 1, 2010
CQ Politics	Safe R	October 28, 2010
New York Times	Safe R	November 1, 2010
FiveThirtyEight	Safe R	November 1, 2010

General election results

Texas's 19th congressional district, 2010
Party	Candidate	Votes	%
Republican	Randy Neugebauer	106,059	77.78
Democratic	Andy Wilson	25,984	19.06
Libertarian	Richard "Chip" Peterson	4,315	3.16
Total votes		136,358	100
Republican hold			

== District 20 ==
2010 Texas's 20th congressional district election
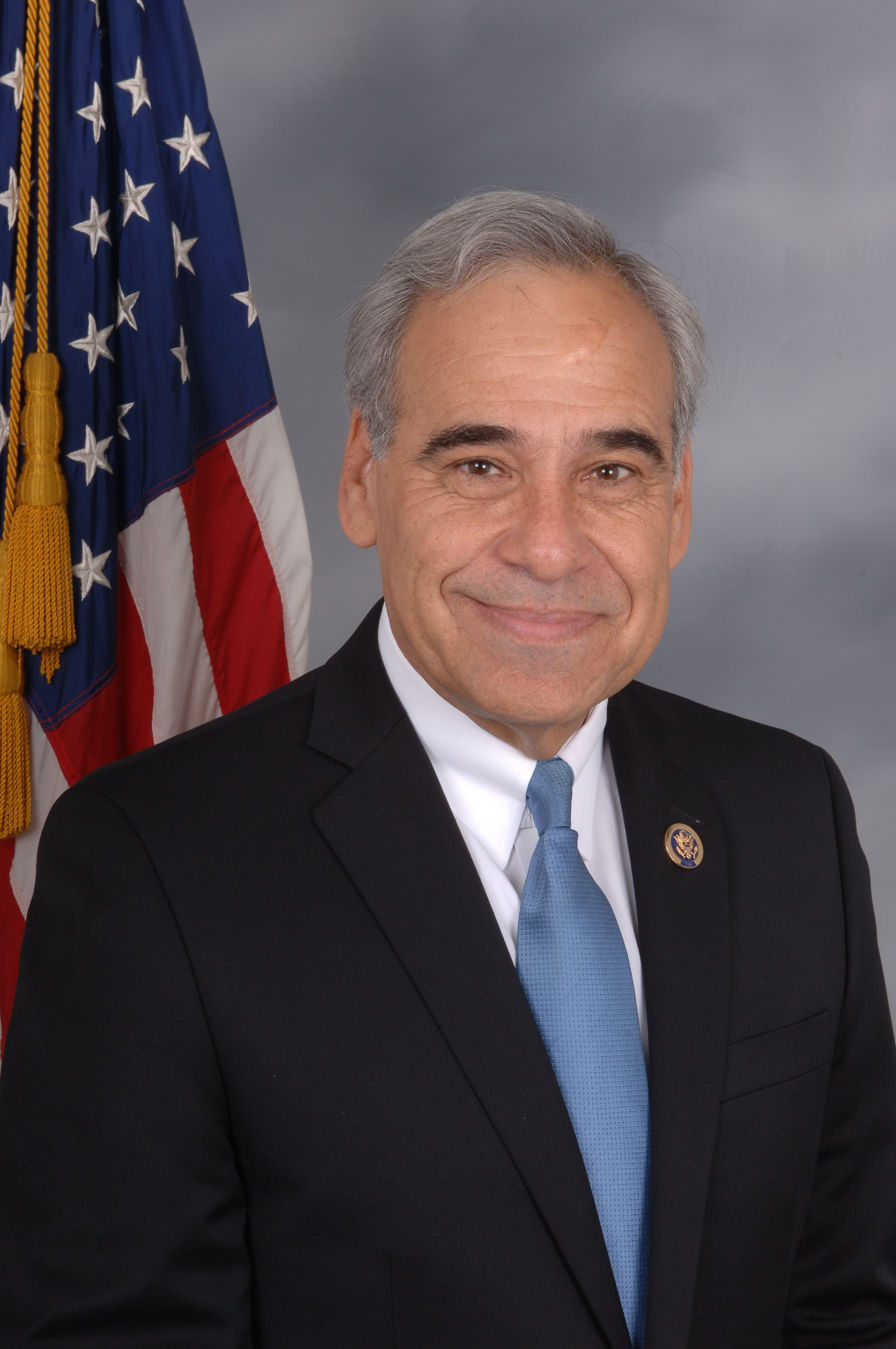

Nominee	Charles A. Gonzalez	Clayton Trotter
Party	Democratic	Republican
Popular vote	58,645	31,757
Percentage	63.6%	34.5%
- County results Gonzalez: 60–70%
U.S. Representative before election
Charlie Gonzalez
Democratic
Elected U.S. Representative
Charles A. Gonzalez
Democratic

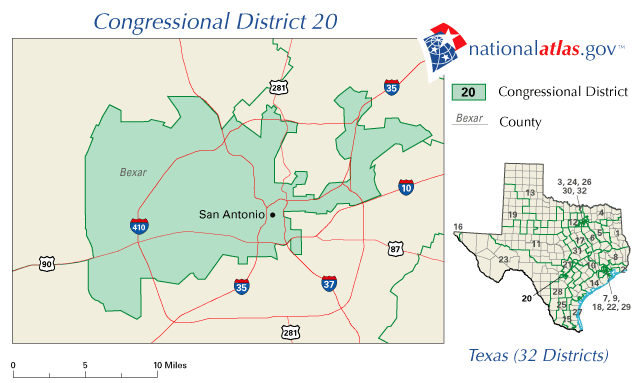

Democrat Charles A. Gonzalez represented much of heavily Democratic, largely Hispanic inner San Antonio.

Predictions

Source	Ranking	As of
The Cook Political Report	Safe D	November 1, 2010
Rothenberg	Safe D	November 1, 2010
Sabato's Crystal Ball	Safe D	November 1, 2010
RCP	Safe D	November 1, 2010
CQ Politics	Safe D	October 28, 2010
New York Times	Safe D	November 1, 2010
FiveThirtyEight	Safe D	November 1, 2010

General election results

Texas's 20th congressional district, 2010
Party	Candidate	Votes	%
Democratic	Charles A. Gonzalez	58,645	63.62
Republican	Clayton Trotter	31,757	34.45
Libertarian	Michael "Commander" Idrogo	1,783	1.93
Total votes		92,185	100
Democratic hold			

== District 21 ==
2010 Texas's 21st congressional district election
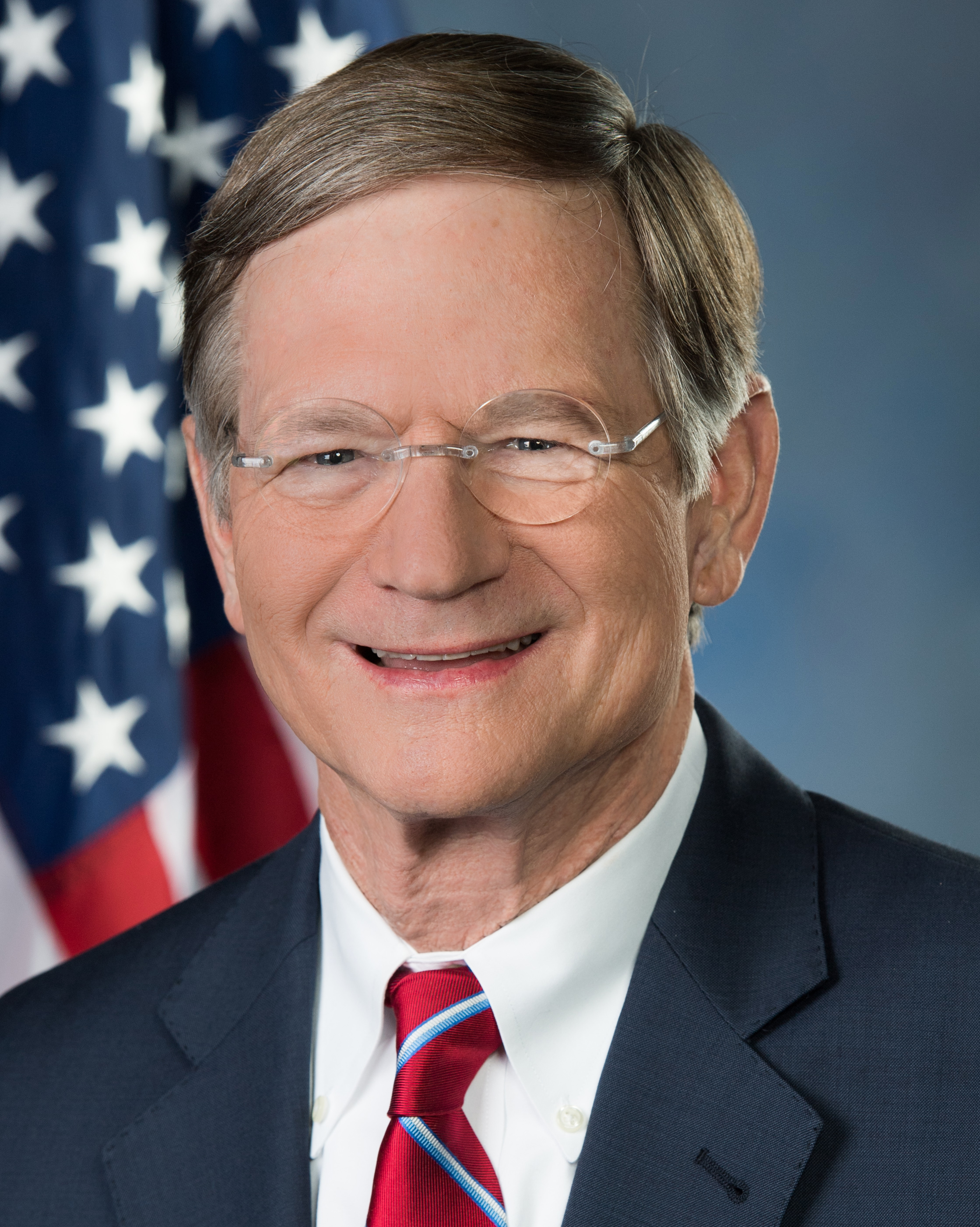

Nominee	Lamar Smith	Lainey Melnick
Party	Republican	Democratic
Popular vote	162,924	65,927
Percentage	68.9%	27.9%
- County results Smith: 50–60% 60–70% 70–80% 80–90%
U.S. Representative before election
Lamar Smith
Republican
Elected U.S. Representative
Lamar Smith
Republican

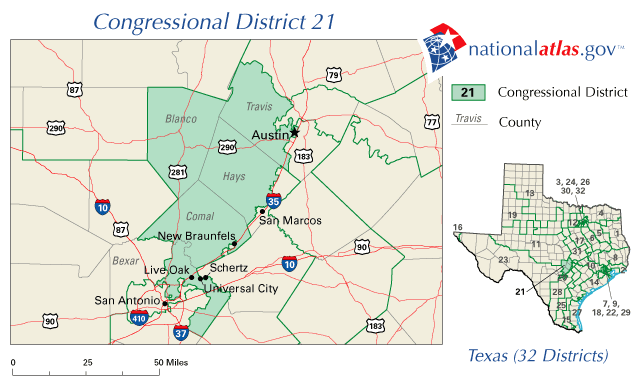

Longtime Republican Lamar S. Smith won re-election with 60% in 2006 and 80% in 2008. In 2010, he won the primary with 80% and faced Democratic real estate broker Lainey Melnick in the general election.

Predictions

Source	Ranking	As of
The Cook Political Report	Safe R	November 1, 2010
Rothenberg	Safe R	November 1, 2010
Sabato's Crystal Ball	Safe R	November 1, 2010
RCP	Safe R	November 1, 2010
CQ Politics	Safe R	October 28, 2010
New York Times	Safe R	November 1, 2010
FiveThirtyEight	Safe R	November 1, 2010

General election results

Texas's 21st congressional district, 2010
Party	Candidate	Votes	%
Republican	Lamar Smith	162,924	68.88
Democratic	Lainey Melnick	65,927	27.87
Libertarian	James Arthur Strohm	7,694	3.25
Total votes		236,545	100
Republican hold			

== District 22 ==
2010 Texas's 22nd congressional district election
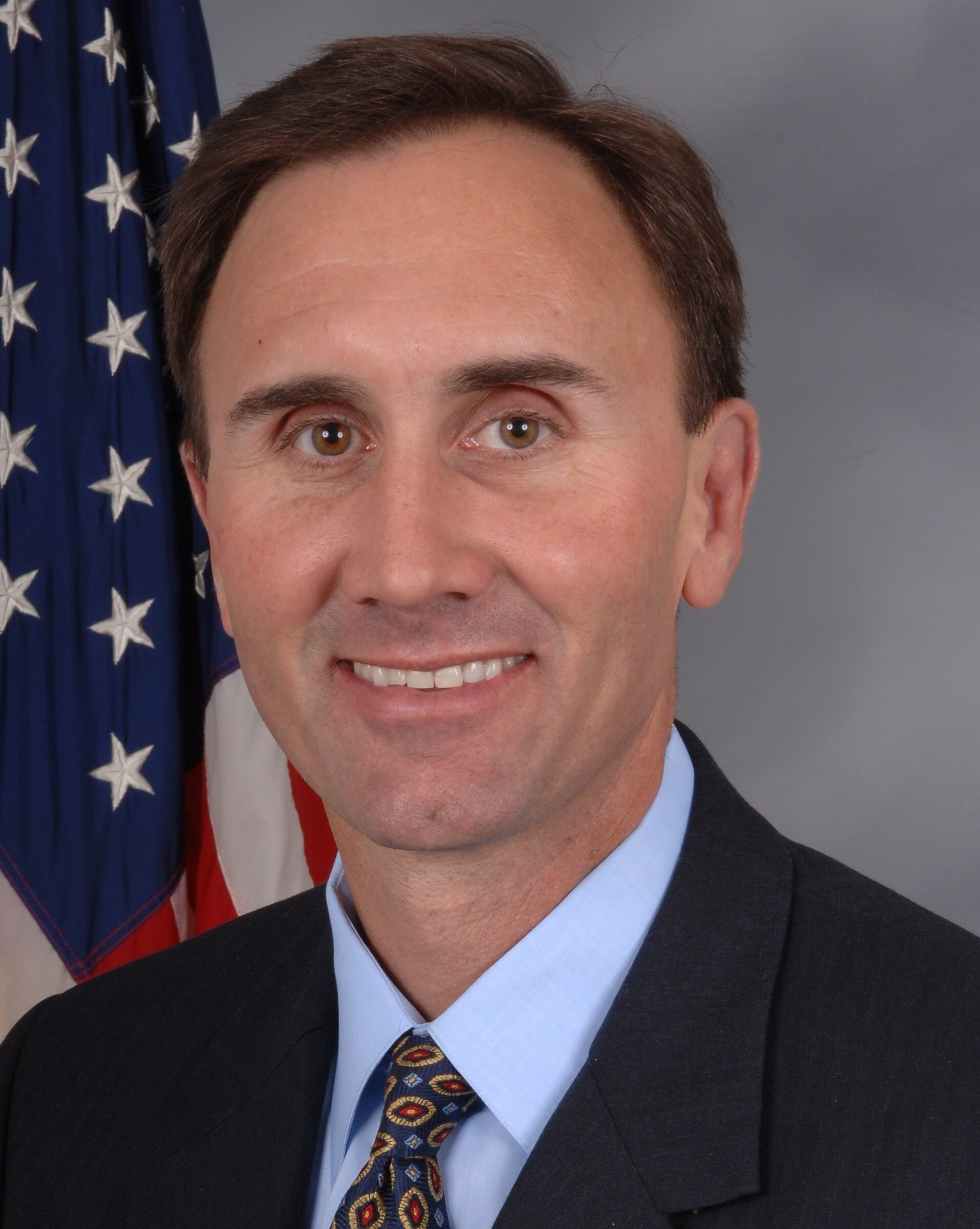

Nominee	Pete Olson	Kesha Rogers
Party	Republican	Democratic
Popular vote	140,537	62,082
Percentage	67.5%	29.8%
- County results Olson: 50–60% 60–70% 70–80%
U.S. Representative before election
Pete Olson
Republican
Elected U.S. Representative
Pete Olson
Republican

Freshman Pete Olson won the 2008 election with 53% in a heavily Republican district. In 2010, he faced Democrat Kesha Rogers, a LaRouche Movement supporter, and Libertarian Steve Susman, a small business owner in the general election.

Predictions

Source	Ranking	As of
The Cook Political Report	Safe R	November 1, 2010
Rothenberg	Safe R	November 1, 2010
Sabato's Crystal Ball	Safe R	November 1, 2010
RCP	Safe R	November 1, 2010
CQ Politics	Safe R	October 28, 2010
New York Times	Safe R	November 1, 2010
FiveThirtyEight	Safe R	November 1, 2010

General election results

Texas's 22nd congressional district, 2010
Party	Candidate	Votes	%
Republican	Pete Olson	140,537	67.49
Democratic	Kesha Rogers	62,082	29.82
Libertarian	Steven Susman	5,538	2.66
Write-in	Johnny Williams	66	0.03
Total votes		208,223	100
Republican hold			

== District 23 ==
2010 Texas's 23rd congressional district election
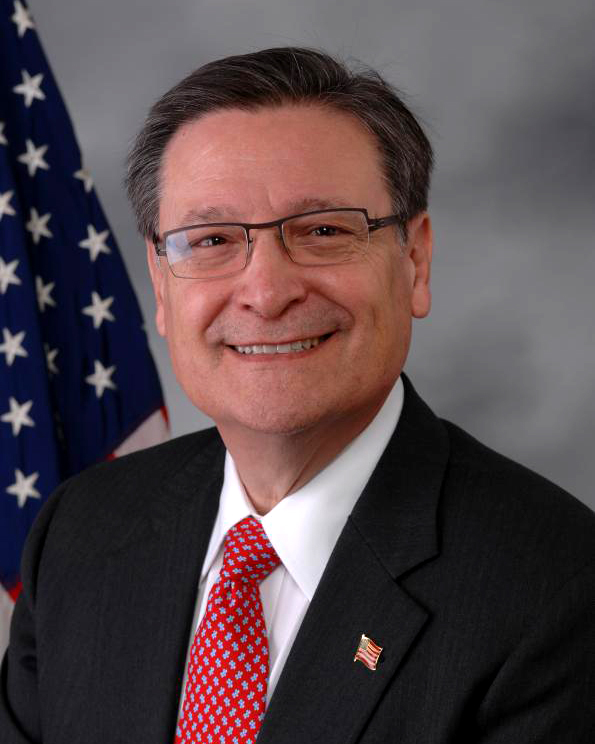

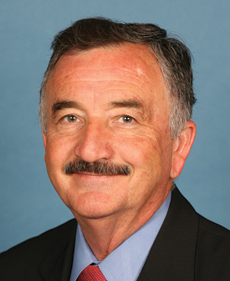
Nominee	Quico Canseco	Ciro Rodriguez
Party	Republican	Democratic
Popular vote	74,853	67,348
Percentage	49.4%	44.4%
- County results Canseco: 40–50% 50–60% 60–70% Rodriguez: 50–60% 60–70% 70–80% 80–90%
U.S. Representative before election
Ciro Rodriguez
Democratic
Elected U.S. Representative
Quico Canseco
Republican

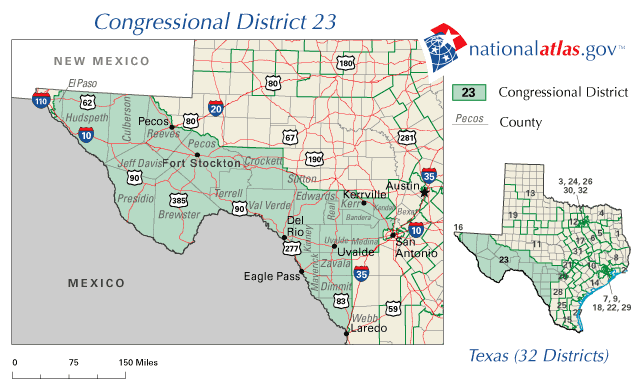

Democratic incumbent Ciro Rodriguez was challenged by Republican nominee Quico Canseco, Libertarian nominee Martin Nitschke campaign site, Green Party nominee Ed Scharf campaign site, and Independent Craig T. Stephens campaign site.

In the 2010 Republican primary, Canseco won the run off election against former CIA officer Will Hurd with 56% of the vote. In the Democratic primary, Rodriguez won with 83% against Iraq war veteran Miguel Ortiz.

In 2008, Rodriguez was re-elected with 56% of the vote. Obama carried the district with 51% of the vote. The district is 55% Hispanic, but has a Republican tilt as George Bush carried the district by a 15% margin in 2004.

Predictions

Source	Ranking	As of
The Cook Political Report	Tossup	November 1, 2010
Rothenberg	Tossup	November 1, 2010
Sabato's Crystal Ball	Lean R (flip)	November 1, 2010
RCP	Lean R (flip)	November 1, 2010
CQ Politics	Tossup	October 28, 2010
New York Times	Tossup	November 1, 2010
FiveThirtyEight	Tossup	November 1, 2010

General election results

Texas's 23rd congressional district, 2010
Party	Candidate	Votes	%
Republican	Quico Canseco	74,671	49.38
Democratic	Ciro Rodriguez (incumbent)	67,212	44.44
Independent	Craig Stephens	5,342	3.58
Libertarian	Martin Nitschke	2,482	1.63
Green	Ed Scharf	1,419	0.93
Total votes		151,126	100.00
Republican gain from Democratic			

== District 24 ==
2010 Texas's 24th congressional district election
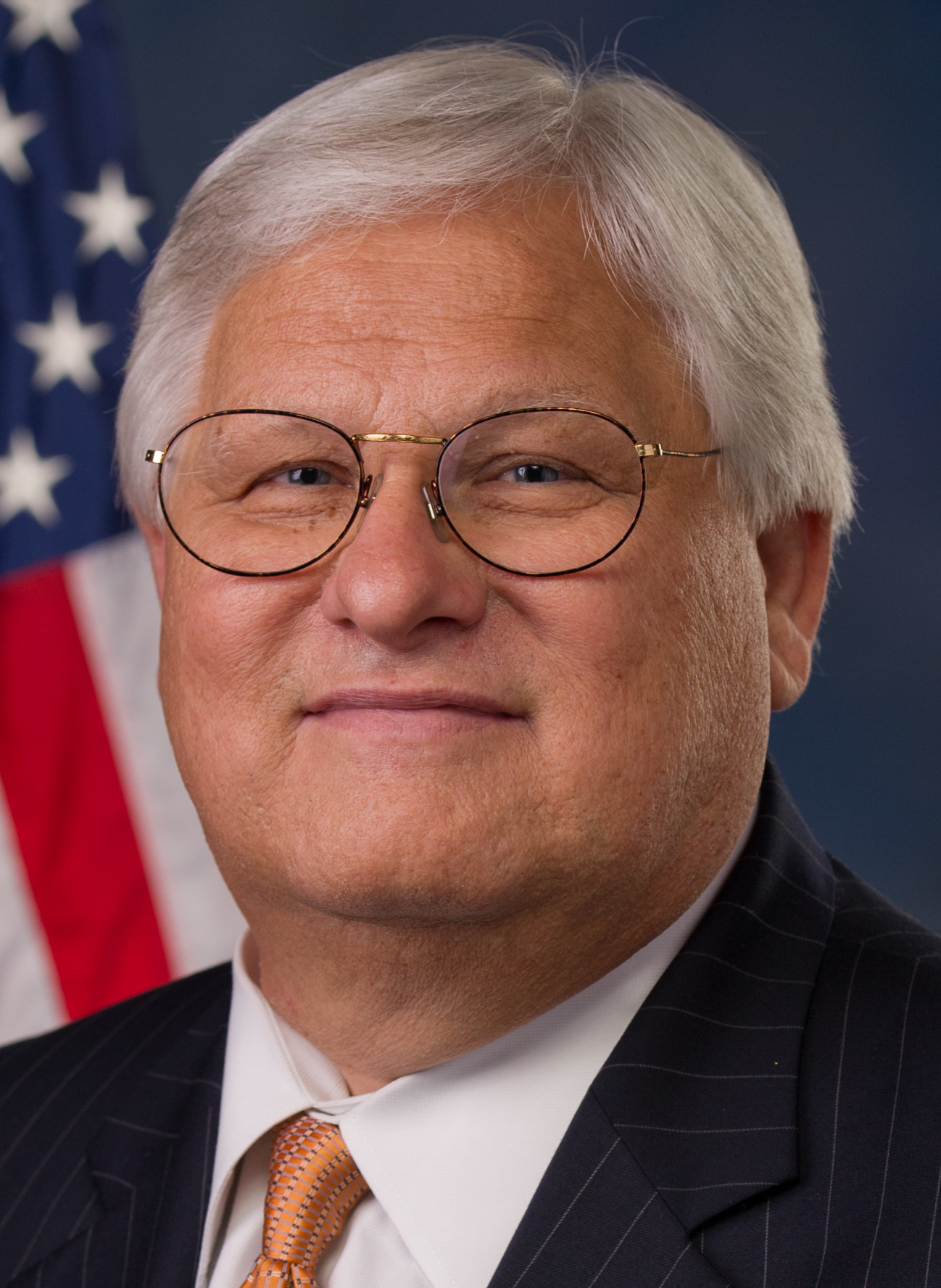

Nominee	Kenny Marchant	David Sparks
Party	Republican	Libertarian
Popular vote	100,078	22,609
Percentage	81.6%	18.4%
- County results Marchant: 70–80% 80–90%
U.S. Representative before election
Kenny Marchant
Republican
Elected U.S. Representative
Kenny Marchant
Republican

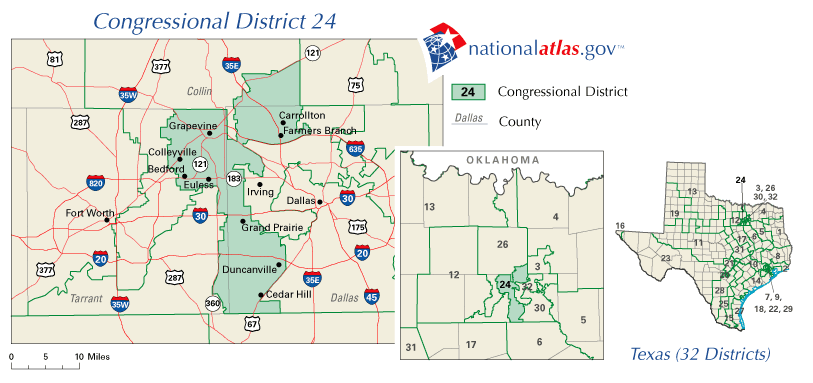

Republican Kenny Marchant faced write-in Democratic candidate Alex Dunaj in the general election.

Predictions

Source	Ranking	As of
The Cook Political Report	Safe R	November 1, 2010
Rothenberg	Safe R	November 1, 2010
Sabato's Crystal Ball	Safe R	November 1, 2010
RCP	Safe R	November 1, 2010
CQ Politics	Safe R	October 28, 2010
New York Times	Safe R	November 1, 2010
FiveThirtyEight	Safe R	November 1, 2010

General election results

Texas's 24th congressional district, 2010
Party	Candidate	Votes	%
Republican	Kenny Marchant	100,078	81.57
Libertarian	David Sparks	22,609	18.43
Total votes		122,687	100
Republican hold			

== District 25 ==
2010 Texas's 25th congressional district election
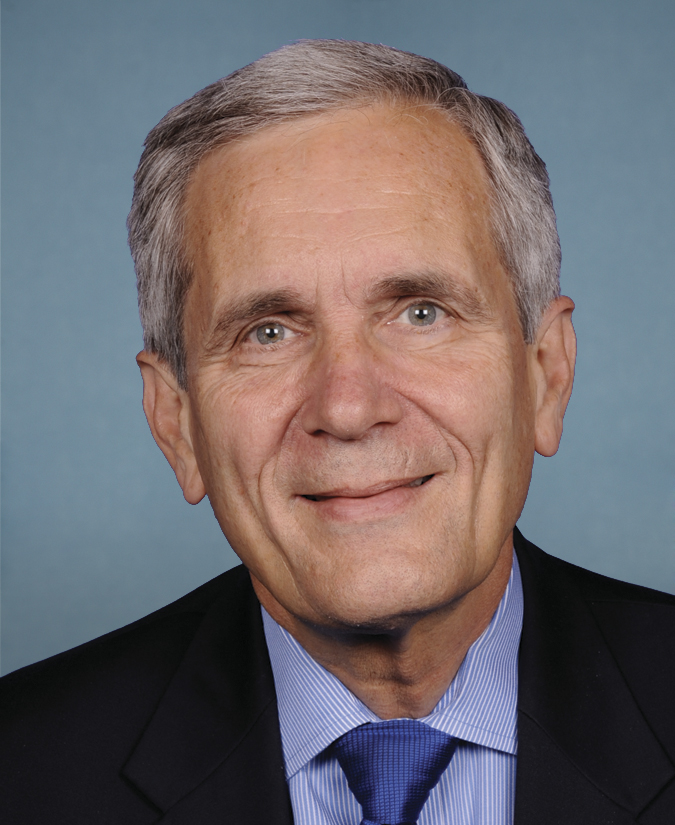

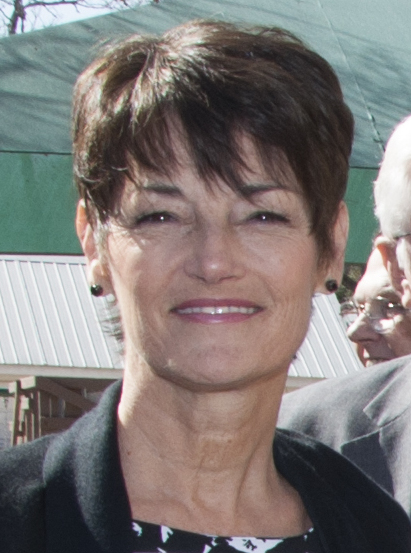
Nominee	Lloyd Doggett	Donna Campbell
Party	Democratic	Republican
Popular vote	99,967	84,849
Percentage	52.8%	44.8%
- County results Doggett: 60–70% Campbell: 50–60% 60–70% 70–80%
U.S. Representative before election
Lloyd Doggett
Democratic
Elected U.S. Representative
Lloyd Doggett
Democratic

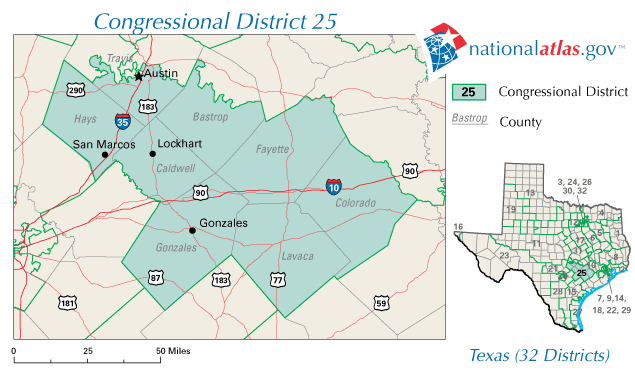

Democrat Lloyd Doggett faced Republican physician Donna Campbell in the general election.

Predictions

Source	Ranking	As of
The Cook Political Report	Safe D	November 1, 2010
Rothenberg	Safe D	November 1, 2010
Sabato's Crystal Ball	Safe D	November 1, 2010
RCP	Likely D	November 1, 2010
CQ Politics	Safe D	October 28, 2010
New York Times	Safe D	November 1, 2010
FiveThirtyEight	Safe D	November 1, 2010

General election results

Texas's 25th congressional district, 2010
Party	Candidate	Votes	%
Democratic	Lloyd Doggett	99,967	52.82
Republican	Donna Campbell	84,849	44.84
Libertarian	Jim Stutsman	4,431	2.34
Total votes		189,247	100
Democratic hold			

== District 26 ==
2010 Texas's 26th congressional district election
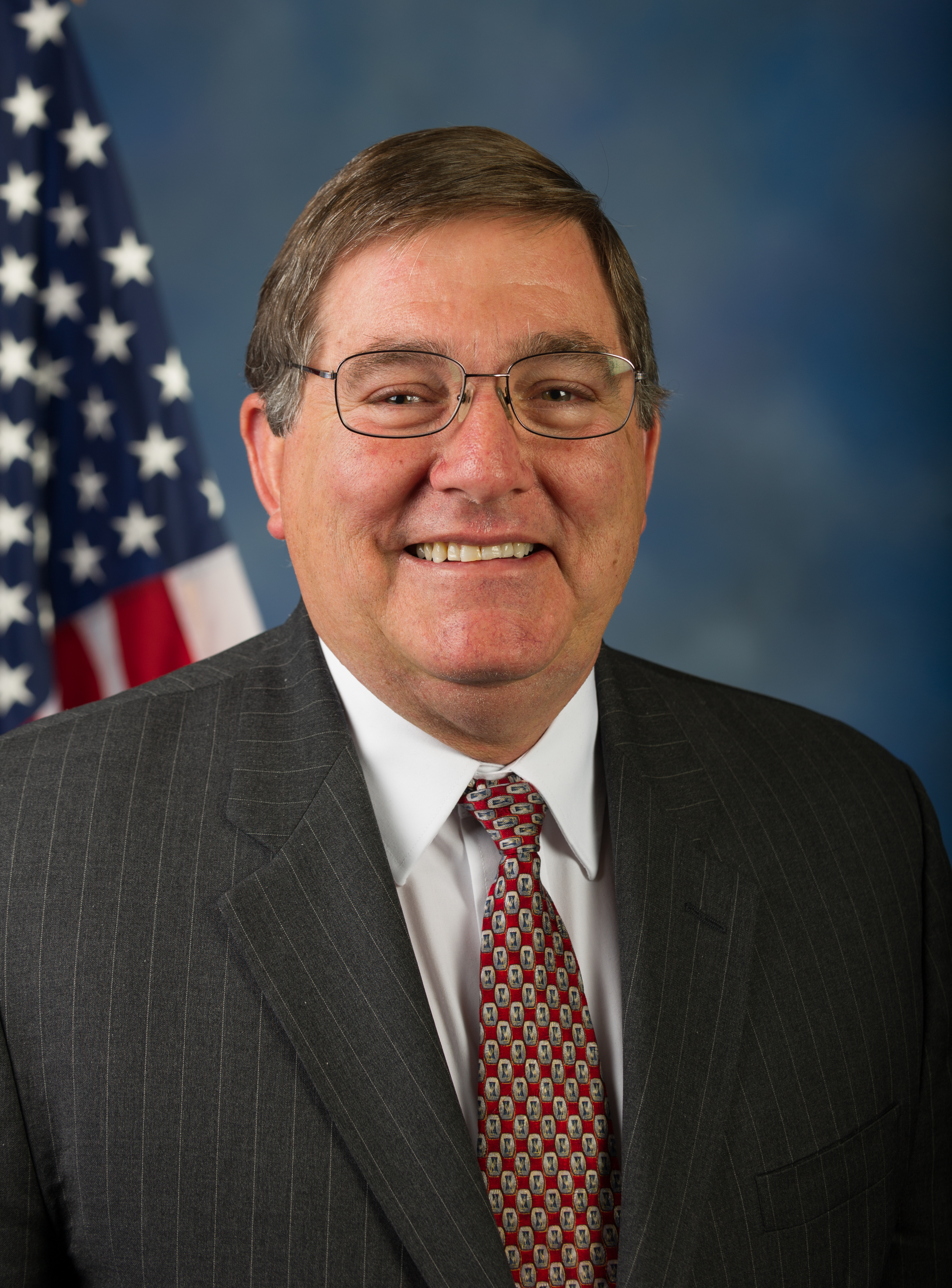

Nominee	Michael Burgess	Neil L. Durrance
Party	Republican	Democratic
Popular vote	120,984	55,385
Percentage	67.0%	30.7%
- County results Burgess: 50–60% 70–80% 80–90% 90–100%
U.S. Representative before election
Michael C. Burgess
Republican
Elected U.S. Representative
Michael Burgess
Republican

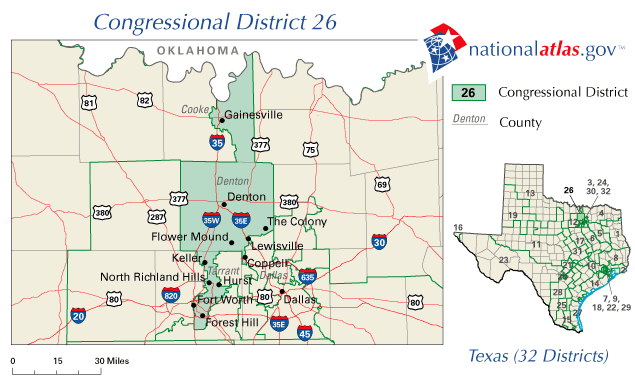

Republican Michael Burgess won re-election in 2008 with 60.2%. In 2010, he faced Democratic attorney Neil Durrance and Libertarian Mark Boler. Except for the district's first election, the 26th District has been held by the GOP and is considered one of its safe seats.

Predictions

Source	Ranking	As of
The Cook Political Report	Safe R	November 1, 2010
Rothenberg	Safe R	November 1, 2010
Sabato's Crystal Ball	Safe R	November 1, 2010
RCP	Safe R	November 1, 2010
CQ Politics	Safe R	October 28, 2010
New York Times	Safe R	November 1, 2010
FiveThirtyEight	Safe R	November 1, 2010

General election results

Texas's 26th congressional district, 2010
Party	Candidate	Votes	%
Republican	Michael Burgess	120,984	67.05
Democratic	Neil L. Durrance	55,385	30.70
Libertarian	Mark Boler	4,062	2.25
Total votes		180,431	100
Republican hold			

== District 27 ==
2010 Texas's 27th congressional district election
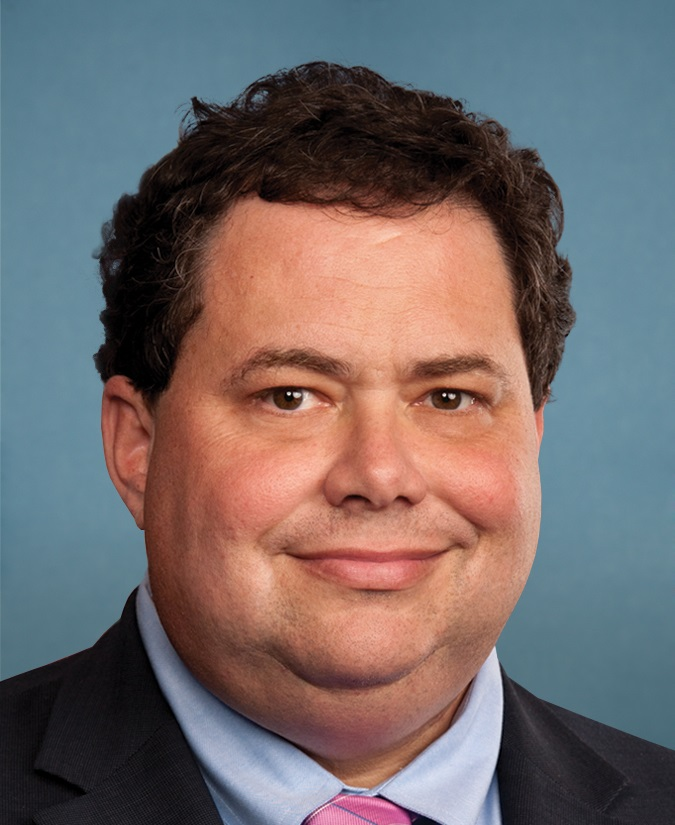

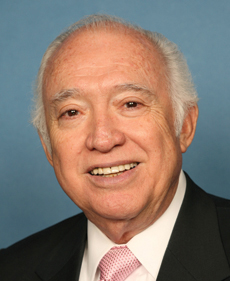
Nominee	Blake Farenthold	Solomon Ortiz
Party	Republican	Democratic
Popular vote	51,001	50,226
Percentage	47.8%	47.1%
- County results Farenthold: 50–60% 70–80% Ortiz: 50–60% 60–70%
U.S. Representative before election
Solomon Ortiz
Democratic
Elected U.S. Representative
Blake Farenthold
Republican

Democratic incumbent Solomon Ortiz was challenged by Republican nominee attorney Blake Farenthold and Libertarian nominee Ed Mishou.

The Republican primary ended in a run off which Farenthold won with 51.3% against conservative activist James Duerr. Mishou, of Cameron County, was the 2010 Libertarian Party nominee and came in a close second to Farenthold in a 2010 27th District Tea Party poll.

Ortiz was re-elected in 2008 with 58% of the vote, although Barack Obama carried the district with just 53% of the vote. The district is nearly 70% Hispanic.

Predictions

Source	Ranking	As of
The Cook Political Report	Lean D	November 1, 2010
Rothenberg	Likely D	November 1, 2010
Sabato's Crystal Ball	Safe D	November 1, 2010
RCP	Tossup	November 1, 2010
CQ Politics	Likely D	October 28, 2010
New York Times	Lean D	November 1, 2010
FiveThirtyEight	Likely D	November 1, 2010

General election results

Texas's 27th congressional district, 2010
Party	Candidate	Votes	%
Republican	Blake Farenthold	51,001	47.84
Democratic	Solomon Ortiz (incumbent)	50,226	47.12
Libertarian	Ed Mishou	5,372	5.04
Total votes		106,599	100.00
Republican gain from Democratic			

== District 28 ==
2010 Texas's 28th congressional district election
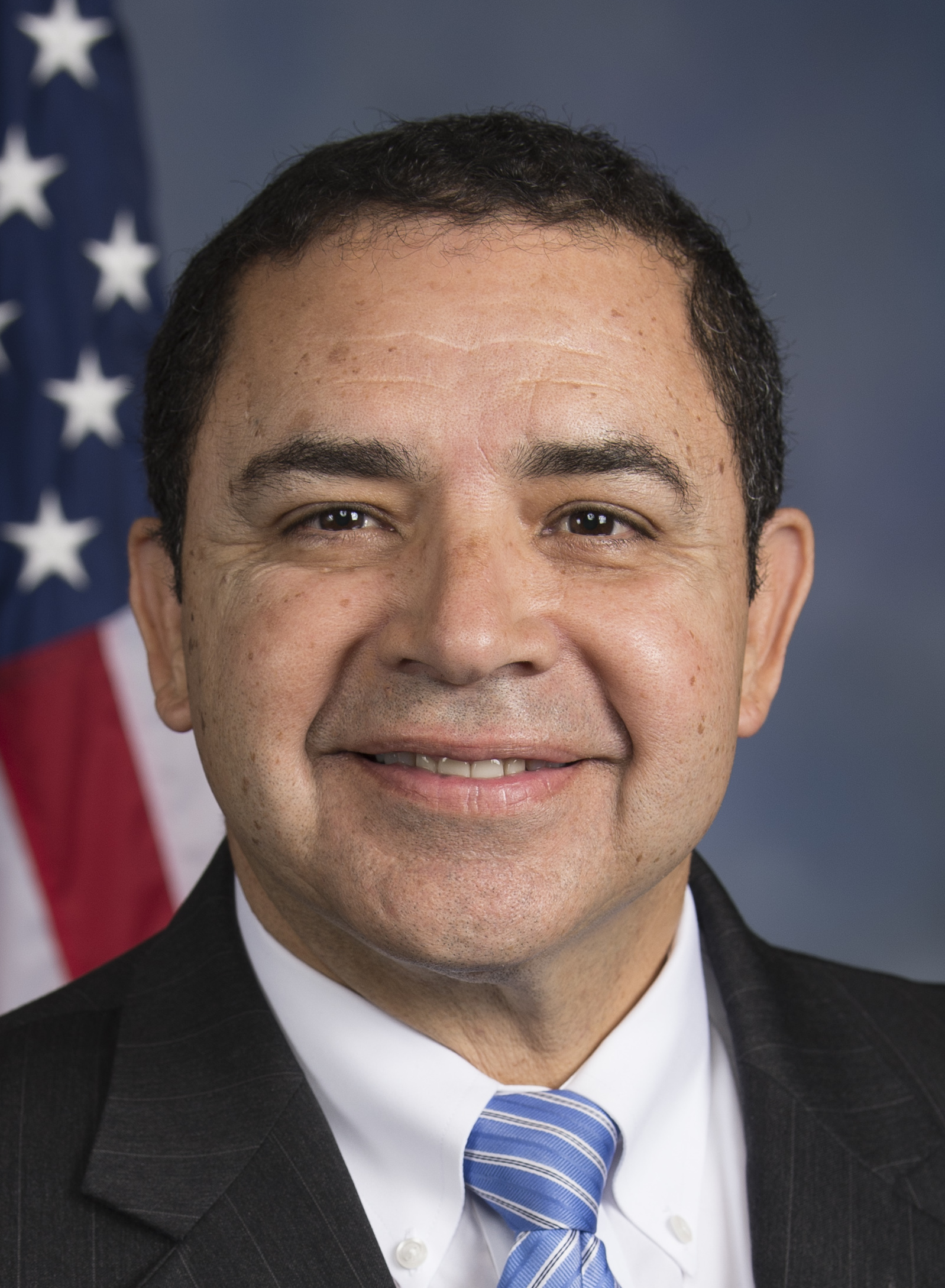

Nominee	Henry Cuellar	Bryan Underwood
Party	Democratic	Republican
Popular vote	62,773	46,740
Percentage	56.4%	42.0%
- County results Cuellar: 50–60% 60–70% 70–80% 80–90% Underwood: 50–60% 60–70% 70–80%
U.S. Representative before election
Henry Cuellar
Democratic
Elected U.S. Representative
Henry Cuellar
Democratic

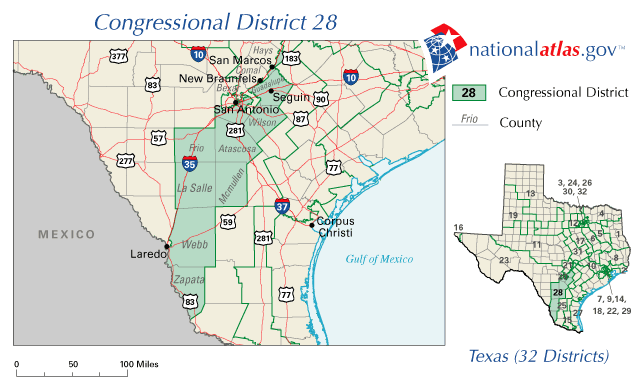

Democrat Henry Cuellar was re-elected in 2008 with 69% of the vote, when Barack Obama carried the district with 56% of the vote. In 2010, he faced Republican businessman Bryan Underwood in the general election.

Predictions

Source	Ranking	As of
The Cook Political Report	Safe D	November 1, 2010
Rothenberg	Safe D	November 1, 2010
Sabato's Crystal Ball	Safe D	November 1, 2010
RCP	Safe D	November 1, 2010
CQ Politics	Safe D	October 28, 2010
New York Times	Safe D	November 1, 2010
FiveThirtyEight	Safe D	November 1, 2010

General election results

Texas's 28th congressional district, 2010
Party	Candidate	Votes	%
Democratic	Henry Cuellar	62,773	56.35
Republican	Bryan Underwood	46,740	41.96
Libertarian	Stephen Kaat	1,889	1.70
Total votes		111,402	100
Democratic hold			

== District 29 ==
2010 Texas's 29th congressional district election
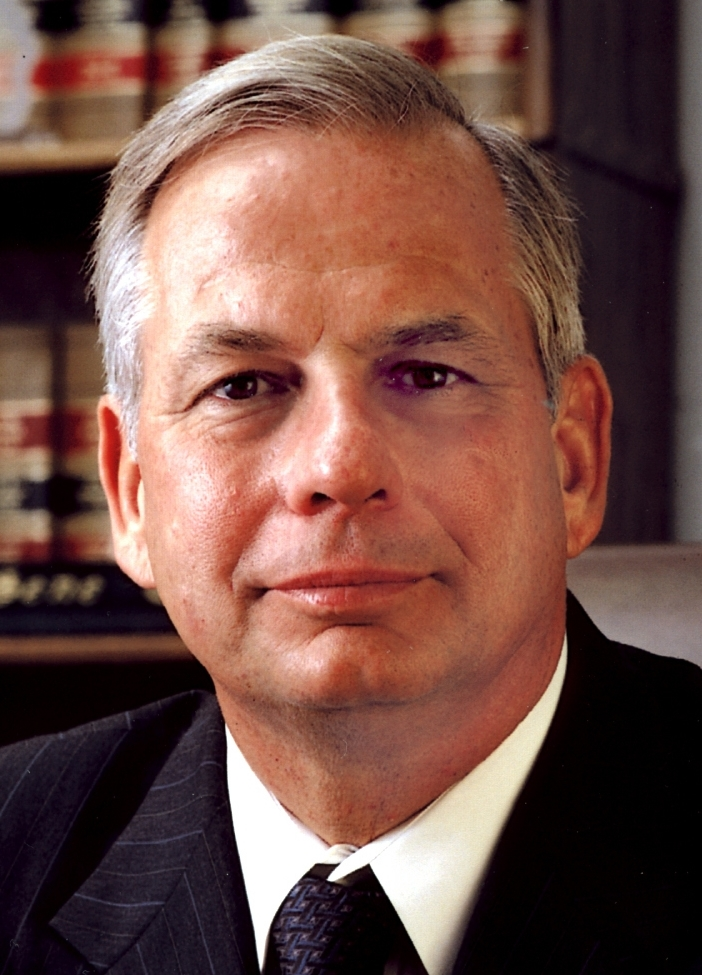

Nominee	Gene Green	Roy Morales
Party	Democratic	Republican
Popular vote	43,257	22,825
Percentage	64.6%	34.1%
- County results Green: 60–70%
U.S. Representative before election
Gene Green
Democratic
Elected U.S. Representative
Gene Green
Democratic

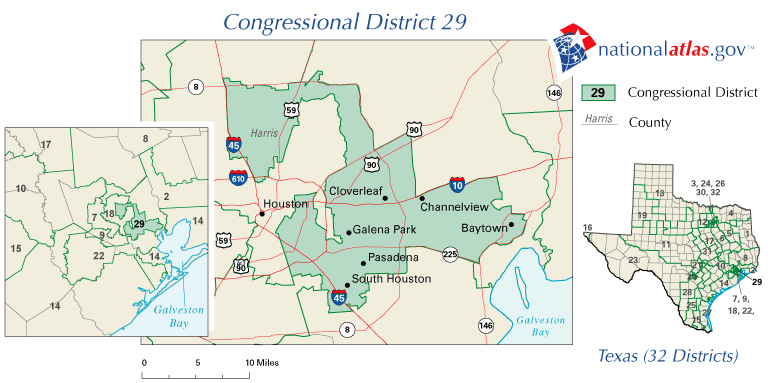

Democrat Gene Green won re-election with 75% in 2008. In 2010, he faced Republican air force veteran Roy Morales.

Predictions

Source	Ranking	As of
The Cook Political Report	Safe D	November 1, 2010
Rothenberg	Safe D	November 1, 2010
Sabato's Crystal Ball	Safe D	November 1, 2010
RCP	Safe D	November 1, 2010
CQ Politics	Safe D	October 28, 2010
New York Times	Safe D	November 1, 2010
FiveThirtyEight	Safe D	November 1, 2010

General election results

Texas's 29th congressional district, 2010
Party	Candidate	Votes	%
Democratic	Gene Green	43,257	64.61
Republican	Roy Morales	22,825	34.09
Libertarian	Brad Walters	866	1.29
Total votes		66,948	100
Democratic hold			

== District 30 ==
2010 Texas's 30th congressional district election
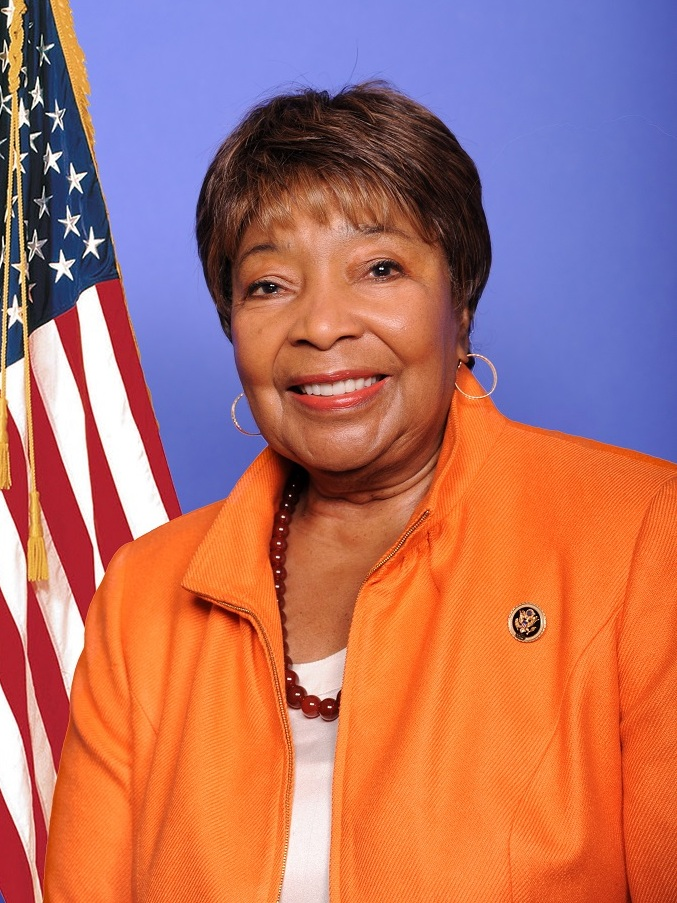

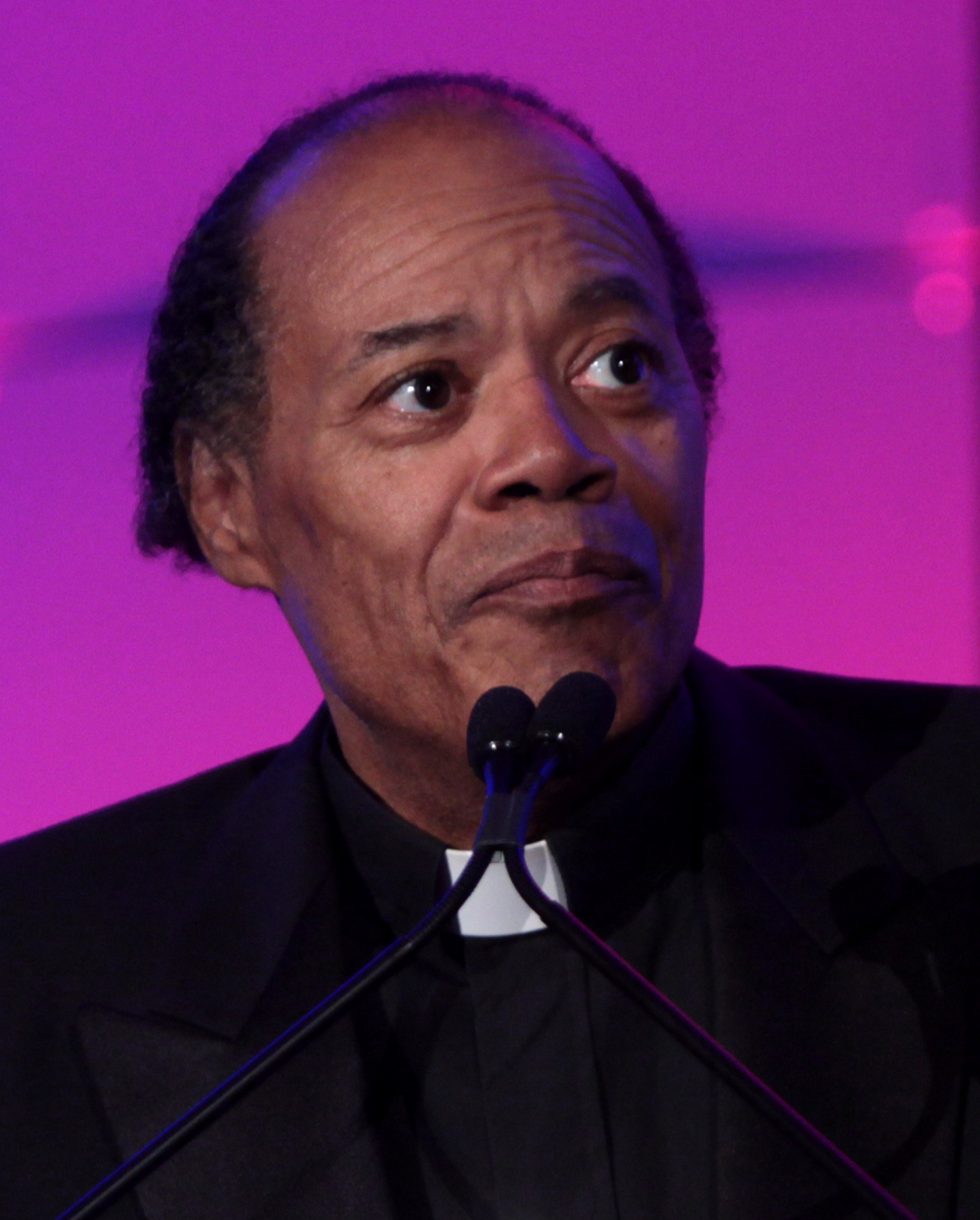
Nominee	Eddie Bernice Johnson	Stephen Broden
Party	Democratic	Republican
Popular vote	86,322	24,668
Percentage	75.7%	24.6%
- County results Johnson: 70–80%
U.S. Representative before election
Eddie Bernice Johnson
Democratic
Elected U.S. Representative
Eddie Bernice Johnson
Democratic

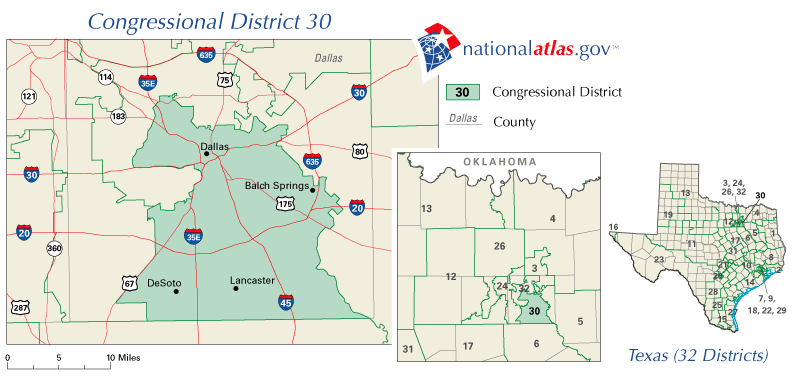

Incumbent Democratic nominee Eddie Bernice Johnson won re-election in 2008 with 83%. In the Republican primary Stephen Broden almost avoided a runoff in the first round, but he won the second round with 67.5% of the vote.

Predictions

Source	Ranking	As of
The Cook Political Report	Safe D	November 1, 2010
Rothenberg	Safe D	November 1, 2010
Sabato's Crystal Ball	Safe D	November 1, 2010
RCP	Safe D	November 1, 2010
CQ Politics	Safe D	October 28, 2010
New York Times	Safe D	November 1, 2010
FiveThirtyEight	Safe D	November 1, 2010

General election results

Texas's 30th congressional district, 2010
Party	Candidate	Votes	%
Democratic	Eddie Bernice Johnson	86,322	75.74
Republican	Stephen Broden	24,668	24.64
Libertarian	J.B. Oswalt	2,988	2.62
Total votes		113,978	100
Democratic hold			

== District 31 ==
2010 Texas's 31st congressional district election
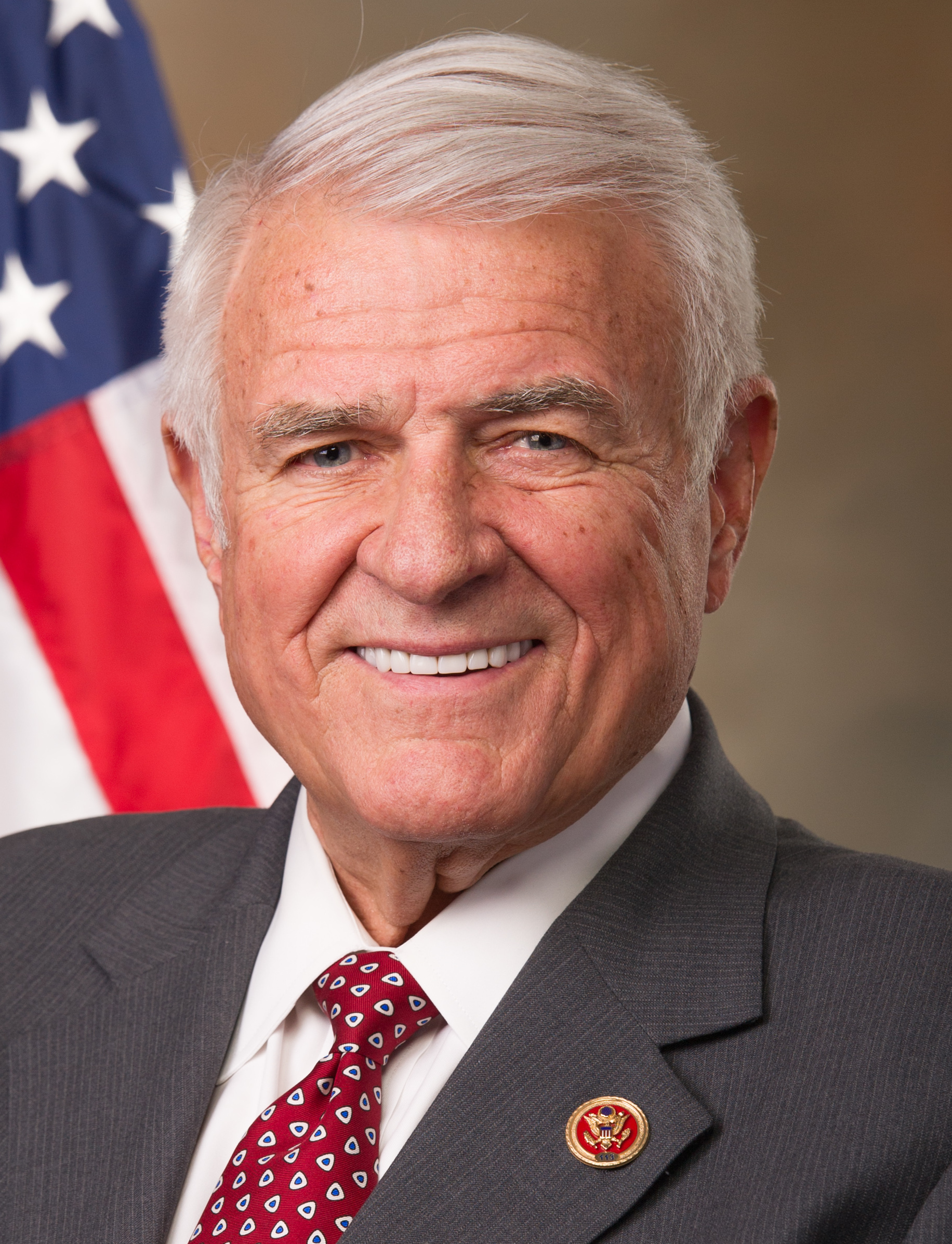

Nominee	John Carter	Bill Oliver
Party	Republican	Libertarian
Popular vote	126,290	26,710
Percentage	82.5%	17.5%
- County results Carter: 80–90%
U.S. Representative before election
John Carter
Republican
Elected U.S. Representative
John Carter
Republican

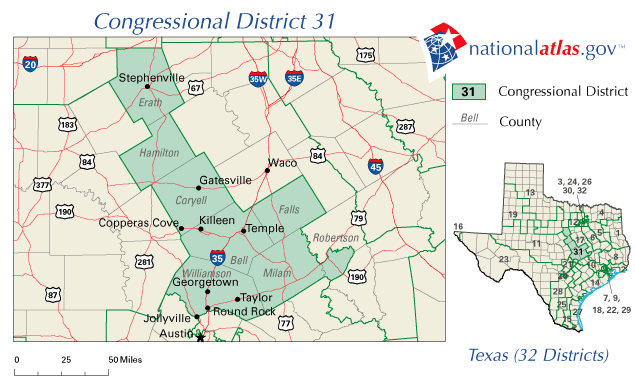

John Carter was opposed by Libertarian Bill Oliver in the general election.

Predictions

Source	Ranking	As of
The Cook Political Report	Safe R	November 1, 2010
Rothenberg	Safe R	November 1, 2010
Sabato's Crystal Ball	Safe R	November 1, 2010
RCP	Safe R	November 1, 2010
CQ Politics	Safe R	October 28, 2010
New York Times	Safe R	November 1, 2010
FiveThirtyEight	Safe R	November 1, 2010

General election results

Texas's 31st congressional district, 2010
Party	Candidate	Votes	%
Republican	John Carter	126,290	82.5
Libertarian	Bill Oliver	26,710	17.5
Total votes		153,000	100.0
Republican hold			

== District 32 ==
2010 Texas's 32nd congressional district election
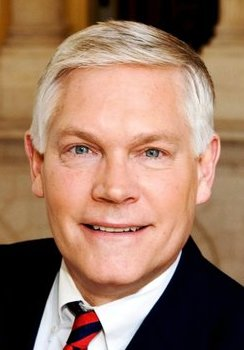

Nominee	Pete Sessions	Grier Raggio
Party	Republican	Democratic
Popular vote	79,433	44,258
Percentage	62.6%	34.9%
- County results Sessions: 60–70%
U.S. Representative before election
Pete Sessions
Republican
Elected U.S. Representative
Pete Sessions
Republican

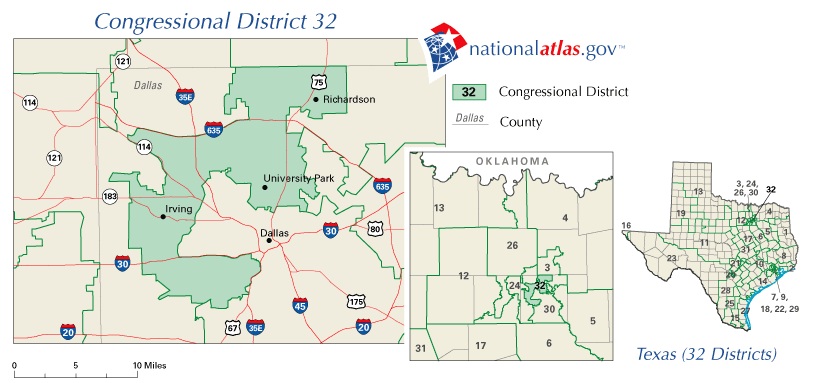

Six-term incumbent Pete Sessions held a Republican-leaning district. In 2010, he faced Democrat Grier Raggio in the general election.

Predictions

Source	Ranking	As of
The Cook Political Report	Safe R	November 1, 2010
Rothenberg	Safe R	November 1, 2010
Sabato's Crystal Ball	Safe R	November 1, 2010
RCP	Safe R	November 1, 2010
CQ Politics	Safe R	October 28, 2010
New York Times	Safe R	November 1, 2010
FiveThirtyEight	Safe R	November 1, 2010

General election results

Texas's 32nd congressional district, 2010
Party	Candidate	Votes	%
Republican	Pete Sessions	79,433	62.61
Democratic	Grier Raggio	44,258	34.88
Libertarian	John Jay Myers	3,178	2.50
Total votes		126,869	100
Republican hold			
