= List of United States commemorative coins (2010s) =

== 2010 ==
=== Non-circulating coins ===
Face value	Coin	Obverse design	Reverse design	Composition	Mintage	Available	Obverse	Reverse
$1	American Veterans Disabled for Life dollar	Legs and boots of three veterans	Forget-me-not flower at the base of a wreath wrapped in a ribbon that cradles and supports clusters of oak branches	Ag 90%, Cu 10%	Authorized: 350,000 (max) Uncirculated: 78,101 W Proof: 202,970 W	2010		
$1	Boy Scouts of America Centennial dollar	Cub Scout in the foreground with a Boy Scout and female Venturer in the background saluting	Boy Scouts of America universal emblem	Ag 90%, Cu 10%	Authorized: 350,000 (max) Uncirculated: 105,000 P Proof: 245,000 P	2010		see article: Boy Scouts of America centennial silver dollar
$10	Abigail Fillmore eagle	Abigail Fillmore	Mrs. Fillmore shelving books in the White House Library, which she established	Au 99.99%	Authorized: 15,000 (max) Uncirculated: 3,482 W Proof: 6,130 W	2010		
$10	Jane Pierce eagle	Jane Pierce	Mrs. Pierce in the visitors' gallery of the Old Senate Chamber, listening to a debate	Au 99.99%	Authorized: 15,000 (max) Uncirculated: 3,338 W Proof: 4,775 W	2010		
$10	James Buchanan's Liberty eagle	Depiction of Liberty based on Coronet (a.k.a. Liberty Head) coinage	Buchanan working as a bookkeeper in the family store	Au 99.99%	Authorized: 15,000 (max) Uncirculated: 5,162 W Proof: 7,110 W	2010		
$10	Mary Todd Lincoln eagle	Mary Todd Lincoln	Mrs. Lincoln giving flowers and a book to Union soldiers during the Civil War	Au 99.99%	Authorized: 20,000 (max) Uncirculated: 3,695 W Proof: 6,861 W	2010		

=== Circulating coins ===
Face value	Coin	Obverse design	Reverse design	Mintage	Obverse	Reverse
25¢	Hot Springs National Park quarter	George Washington	The park headquarters building with a thermal fountain in front of it	Circulation: 35,600,000 P 34,000,000 D Uncirculated: ---- P (satin) ---- D (satin) Proof: 1,401,903 S (clad); 859,435 S (silver)		
25¢	Yellowstone National Park quarter	George Washington	A bison and Old Faithful	Circulation: 33,600,000 P 34,800,000 D Uncirculated: ---- P (satin) ---- D (satin) Proof: 1,402,756 S (clad); 859,435 S (silver)		
25¢	Yosemite National Park quarter	George Washington	El Capitan	Circulation: 35,200,000 P 34,800,000 D Uncirculated: ---- P (satin) ---- D (satin) Proof: 1,400,215 S (clad); 859,435 S (silver)		
25¢	Grand Canyon National Park quarter	George Washington	Marble Canyon	Circulation: 34,800,000 P 35,400,000 D Uncirculated: ---- P (satin) ---- D (satin) Proof: 1,399,970 S (clad); 859,435 S (silver)		
25¢	Mount Hood National Forest quarter	George Washington	Lost Lake with Mount Hood in the distance	Circulation: 34,400,000 P 34,400,000 D Uncirculated: ---- P (satin) ---- D (satin) Proof: 1,397,101 S (clad); 859,435 S (silver)		
$1	Native American "Government" dollar	Sacagawea	Hiawatha Belt encircling five arrows	Circulation: 32,060,000 P 48,720,000 D Uncirculated: ---- P ---- D Proof: 1,689,216 S	see article: Sacagawea dollar	
$1	Millard Fillmore dollar	Millard Fillmore	Statue of Liberty	Circulation: 35,560,000 P 37,100,000 D Uncirculated ---- P (satin) ---- D (satin) Proof: 2,224,613 S		
$1	Franklin Pierce dollar	Franklin Pierce	Statue of Liberty	Circulation: 38,080,000 P 37,940,000 D Uncirculated ---- P (satin) ---- D (satin) Proof: 2,224,613 S		
$1	James Buchanan dollar	James Buchanan	Statue of Liberty	Circulation: 37,660,000 P 36,820,000 D Uncirculated ---- P (satin) ---- D (satin) Proof: 2,224,613 S		
$1	Abraham Lincoln dollar	Abraham Lincoln	Statue of Liberty	Circulation: 37,100,000 P 37,100,000 D Uncirculated ---- P (satin) ---- D (satin) Proof: 2,224,613 S		

== 2011 ==
=== Non-circulating coins ===
Face value	Coin	Obverse design	Reverse design	Composition	Mintage	Available	Obverse	Reverse
$1	Medal of Honor dollar	Current versions of the Army, Navy and Air Force Medals of Honor	A soldier carrying a wounded comrade	Ag 90%, Cu 10%	Authorized: 500,000 (max) Uncirculated: 44,769 S Proof: 112,850 P	2011		
$5	Medal of Honor half eagle	The original 1861 version of the Medal of Honor	Minerva holding a shield and the Union flag, flanked by Civil War-era cannon	Au 90%, Ag 6%, Cu 4%	Authorized: 100,000 (max) Uncirculated: 8,251 S Proof: 18,012 S	2011		
50¢	United States Army half dollar	U.S. Army soldier surveying, two servicemen building a flood wall and a Redstone Army rocket	Enlisted Continental soldier armed with a musket and 13 stars	Cu 92%, Ni 8%	Authorized: 750,000 (max) Uncirculated: 39,461 D Proof: 68,349 S	2011		
$1	United States Army dollar	Male and female soldiers	Great Seal of the United States surrounded by seven virtues of the Army	Ag 90%, Cu 10%	Authorized: 500,000 (max) Uncirculated: 43,517 S Proof: 119,829 S	2011		
$5	United States Army half eagle	Continental, Civil War, modern, World War II and World War I soldiers	Based on the U.S. Army emblem, traditional armaments, including armor, cannons, and crossed flags	Au 90%, Ag 6%, Cu 4%	Authorized: 100,000 (max) Uncirculated: 8,062 P Proof: 17,173 P	2011		
$10	Eliza Johnson eagle	Eliza Johnson	Three children dancing and a Marine Band violinist at the children's ball that was held for President Johnson's 60th birthday	Au 99.99%	Authorized: 15,000 (max) Uncirculated: 2,905 W Proof: 3,887 W	May 5, 2011 – June 20, 2012		
$10	Julia Grant eagle	Julia Grant	Grant and a young Julia Dent horse riding at White Haven, her family home	Au 99.99%	Authorized: 15,000 (max) Uncirculated: 2,892 W Proof: 3,943 W	June 23, 2011 – August 28, 2012		
$10	Lucy Hayes eagle	Lucy Hayes	Mrs. Hayes hosting the first Easter Egg Roll at the White House, 1877	Au 99.99%	Authorized: 15,000 (max) Uncirculated: 2,196 W Proof: 3,868 W	September 1, 2011 – December 31, 2012		
$10	Lucretia Garfield eagle	Lucretia Garfield	Mrs. Garfield painting on a canvas with brush and palette	Au 99.99%	Authorized: 15,000 (max) Uncirculated: 2,168 W Proof: 3,653 W	December 1, 2011 – December 31, 2012		

=== Circulating coins ===
Face value	Coin	Obverse design	Reverse design	Mintage	Obverse	Reverse
25¢	Gettysburg National Military Park quarter	George Washington	The 72nd Pennsylvania Infantry Monument	Circulation: 30,400,000 P 30,800,000 D Proof: 1,271,553 S (clad); 722,076 S (silver)		
25¢	Glacier National Park quarter	George Washington	A mountain goat with Reynolds Mountain in the distance	Circulation: 30,400,000 P 31,200,000 D Proof: 1,268,452 S (clad); 722,076 S (silver)		
25¢	Olympic National Park quarter	George Washington	A Roosevelt elk at the Hoh River with Mount Olympus in the distance	Circulation: 30,400,000 P 30,600,000 D Proof: 1,267,361 S (clad); 722,076 S (silver)		
25¢	Vicksburg National Military Park quarter	George Washington	The USS Cairo on the Yazoo River	Circulation: 30,800,000 P 33,400,000 D Proof: 1,267,691 S (clad); 722,076 S (silver)		
25¢	Chickasaw National Recreation Area quarter	George Washington	The Lincoln Bridge	Circulation: 73,800,000 P 69,400,000 D Proof: 1,266,010 S (clad); 722,076 S (silver)		
$1	Native American "Diplomacy" dollar	Sacagawea	Hands of Ousamequin and John Carver holding a ceremonial pipe	Circulation: 29,400,000 P 48,160,000 D Proof: 1,673,010 S	see article: Sacagawea dollar	
$1	Andrew Johnson dollar	Andrew Johnson	Statue of Liberty	Circulation: 35,560,000 P 37,100,000 D Proof: 1,972,863 S		
$1	Ulysses S. Grant dollar	Ulysses S. Grant	Statue of Liberty	Circulation: 38,080,000 P 37,940,000 D Proof: 1,972,863 S		
$1	Rutherford B. Hayes dollar	Rutherford B. Hayes	Statue of Liberty	Circulation: 37,660,000 P 36,820,000 D Proof: 1,972,863 S		
$1	James A. Garfield dollar	James A. Garfield	Statue of Liberty	Circulation: 37,100,000 P 37,100,000 D Proof: 1,972,863 S		

== 2012 ==
=== Non-circulating coins ===
Face value	Coin	Obverse design	Reverse design	Composition	Mintage	Available	Obverse	Reverse
$1	Infantry Soldier dollar	Modern infantryman advancing	Crossed rifles insignia, the branch insignia of the Infantry	Ag 90%, Cu 10%	Authorized: 350,000 (max) Uncirculated: 44,348 W Proof: 161,151 W	2012		
$1	Star-Spangled Banner dollar	Lady Liberty waving the 15-star, 15-stripe Star-Spangled Banner flag with Fort McHenry in the background	Close-up of a waving modern American flag	Ag 90%, Cu 10%	Authorized: 500,000 (max) Uncirculated: 41,679 S Proof: 168,981 P	2012		
$5	Star-Spangled Banner half eagle	Naval battle scene from the War of 1812	O say can you see in Francis Scott Key's handwriting against a backdrop of 15 stars and 15 stripes	Au 90%, Ag 6%, Cu 4%	Authorized: 100,000 (max) Uncirculated: 7,006 W Proof: 18,299 W	2012		
$10	Alice Paul eagle	Alice Paul	Alice Paul marching for women's suffrage	Au 99.99%	Authorized: 13,000 (max) Uncirculated: 2,798 W Proof: 3,505 W	October 11, 2012 – December 31, 2013		
$10	Frances Cleveland (1st term) eagle	Frances Cleveland	Mrs. Cleveland hosting a working women's reception	Au 99.99%	Authorized: 13,000 (max) Uncirculated: 2,454 W Proof: 3,158 W	November 15, 2012 – December 31, 2013		
$10	Caroline Harrison eagle	Caroline Harrison	Orchid and paint brushes	Au 99.99%	Authorized: 13,000 (max) Uncirculated: 2,436 W Proof: 3,046 W	December 6, 2012 – December 31, 2013		
$10	Frances Cleveland (2nd term) eagle	Frances Cleveland	Mrs. Cleveland delivering a speech	Au 99.99%	Authorized: 13,000 (max) Uncirculated: 2,425 W Proof: 3,104 W	December 20, 2012 – December 31, 2013		

=== Circulating coins ===
Face value	Coin	Obverse design	Reverse design	Mintage	Obverse	Reverse
25¢	El Yunque National Forest quarter	George Washington	A Puerto Rican parrot and a coqui tree frog	Circulation: 25,800,000 P 25,000,000 D Uncirculated: 1,679,240 S Proof: 1,010,361 S (clad); 557,891 S (silver)		
25¢	Chaco Culture National Historical Park quarter	George Washington	Two elevated kivas that are part of the Chetro Ketl complex	Circulation: 22,000,000 P 22,000,000 D Uncirculated: 1,389,020 S Proof: 960,049 S (clad); 557,891 S (silver)		
25¢	Acadia National Park quarter	George Washington	The Bass Harbor Head Lighthouse	Circulation: 24,800,000 P 21,606,000 D Uncirculated: 1,409,120 S Proof: 960,409 S (clad); 557,891 S (silver)		
25¢	Hawaii Volcanoes National Park quarter	George Washington	Kīlauea	Circulation: 46,200,000 P 78,600,000 D Uncirculated: 1,407,520 S Proof: 961,272 S (clad); 557,891 S (silver)		
25¢	Denali National Park and Preserve quarter	George Washington	A Dall sheep with Denali in the background	Circulation: 135,400,000 P 166,600,000 D Uncirculated: 1,401,920 S Proof: 957,856 S (clad); 557,891 S (silver)		
$1	Native American "Trade Routes" dollar ^{[Note 1]}	Sacagawea	Native American and a horse in the foreground with a group of galloping horses in the background	Uncirculated: 2,800,000 P 3,080,000 D Proof: 1,189,445 S	see article: Sacagawea dollar	
$1	Chester A. Arthur dollar ^{[Note 1]}	Chester A. Arthur	Statue of Liberty	Uncirculated: 6,020,000 P 4,060,000 D Proof: 1,438,710 S		
$1	Grover Cleveland (first term) dollar ^{[Note 1]}	Grover Cleveland	Statue of Liberty	Uncirculated: 5,460,000 P 4,060,000 D Proof: 1,438,710 S		
$1	Benjamin Harrison dollar ^{[Note 1]}	Benjamin Harrison	Statue of Liberty	Uncirculated: 5,640,001 P 4,200,000 D Proof: 1,438,710 S		
$1	Grover Cleveland (second term) dollar ^{[Note 1]}	Grover Cleveland	Statue of Liberty	Uncirculated: 10,680,000 P 3,920,000 D Proof: 1,438,710 S		

== 2013 ==
=== Non-circulating coins ===
Face value	Coin	Obverse design	Reverse design	Composition	Mintage	Available	Obverse	Reverse
$1	Girl Scouts of the USA silver dollar	Three girls representing the different ages and diversity	The iconic trefoil/profiles symbol of the Girl Scouts of the USA	Ag 90%, Cu 10%	Authorized: 350,000 (max) Uncirculated: 37,462 W Proof: 86,355 W	2013		
50¢	5-Star Generals half dollar	Henry H. Arnold and Omar N. Bradley	The heraldic crest of Fort Leavenworth, site of the CGSC	Cu 92%, Ni 8%	Authorized: 750,000 (max) Uncirculated: 38,095 P Proof: 47,326 S	2013		
$1	5-Star Generals dollar	George C. Marshall and Dwight D. Eisenhower	The Leavenworth Lamp, the symbol of the CGSC	Ag 90%, Cu 10%	Authorized: 500,000 (max) Uncirculated: 34,638 W Proof: 69,283 P	2013		
$5	5-Star Generals half eagle	Douglas MacArthur	The Leavenworth Lamp, the symbol of the CGSC	Au 90%, Ag 6%, Cu 4%	Authorized: 100,000 (max) Uncirculated: 5,667 P Proof: 15,834 S	March 21, 2013 - December 31, 2013		
$10	Ida McKinley eagle	Ida McKinley	Mrs. McKinley's hands crocheting slippers	Au 99.99%	Authorized: 10,000 (max) Uncirculated: 2,008 W Proof: 2,724 W	2013 - 2015		
$10	Edith Roosevelt eagle	Edith Roosevelt	Image of the White House with compass and "The White House Restored 1902"	Au 99.99%	Authorized: 10,000 (max) Uncirculated: 2,027 W Proof: 2,840 W	2013 - 2015		
$10	Helen Taft eagle	Helen Taft	Cherry blossom of Prunus serrulata, brought to Washington, DC by Mrs. Taft	Au 99.99%	Authorized: 10,000 (max) Uncirculated: 1,993 W Proof: 2,598 W	2013 - 2015		
$10	Ellen Wilson eagle	Ellen Wilson	Commemoration of Mrs. Wilson's creation of the White House Rose Garden	Au 99.99%	Authorized: 10,000 (max) Uncirculated: 1,980 W Proof: 2,511 W	2013 - 2015		
$10	Edith Wilson eagle	Edith Wilson	Image commemorating Mrs. Wilson's support for her husband after his stroke; the President holds onto a cane with Edith's hand resting warmly on top	Au 99.99%	Authorized: 10,000 (max) Uncirculated: 1,974 W Proof: 2,464 W	2013 - 2015		

=== Circulating coins ===
Face value	Coin	Obverse design	Reverse design	Mintage	Obverse	Reverse
25¢	White Mountain National Forest quarter	George Washington	Mount Chocorua with birch trees in the foreground	Circulation: 68,800,000 P 107,600,000 D Uncirculated: 1,606,900 S Proof: 950,080 S (clad); 579,409 S (silver)		
25¢	Perry's Victory and International Peace Memorial quarter	George Washington	The statue of Oliver Hazard Perry and the International Peace Memorial column	Circulation: 107,800,000 P 131,600,000 D Uncirculated: 1,425,860 S Proof: 913,563 S (clad); 579,409 S (silver)		
25¢	Great Basin National Park quarter	George Washington	A bristlecone pine	Circulation: 122,400,000 P 141,400,000 D Uncirculated: 1,316,580 S Proof: 911,525 S (clad); 579,409 S (silver)		
25¢	Fort McHenry National Monument quarter	George Washington	Fort McHenry under bombardment	Circulation: 120,000,000 P 151,400,000 D Uncirculated: 1,314,740 S Proof: 911,451 S (clad); 579,409 S (silver)		
25¢	Mount Rushmore National Memorial quarter	George Washington	Workers carving the Mount Rushmore National Memorial	Circulation: 231,800,000 P 272,400,000 D Uncirculated: 1,373,260 S Proof: 920,695 S (clad); 579,409 S (silver)		
$1	Native American "Delaware Treaty" dollar ^{[Note 1]}	Sacagawea	Turkey, wolf, and turtle	Uncirculated: 1,820,000 P 1,820,000 D Proof: 1,192,690 S	see article: Sacagawea dollar	
$1	William McKinley dollar ^{[Note 1]}	William McKinley	Statue of Liberty	Uncirculated: 4,760,000 P 3,365,100 D Proof: 1,449,415 S		
$1	Theodore Roosevelt dollar ^{[Note 1]}	Theodore Roosevelt	Statue of Liberty	Uncirculated: 5,310,700 P 3,920,000 D Proof: 1,449,415 S		
$1	William Howard Taft dollar ^{[Note 1]}	William Howard Taft	Statue of Liberty	Uncirculated: 4,760,000 P 3,360,000 D Proof: 1,449,415 S		
$1	Woodrow Wilson dollar ^{[Note 1]}	Woodrow Wilson	Statue of Liberty	Uncirculated: 4,620,000 P 3,360,000 D Proof: 1,449,415 S		

== 2014 ==
=== Non-circulating coins ===
Face value	Coin	Obverse design	Reverse design	Composition	Mintage	Available	Obverse	Reverse
$1	Civil Rights Act of 1964 dollar	Three people holding hands at a civil rights march	Three flames intertwined	Ag 90%, Cu 10%	Authorized: 350,000 (max) Uncirculated: 24,720 P Proof: 61,992 P	2014		
50¢	National Baseball Hall of Fame half dollar	Baseball glove	Baseball	Cu 92%, Ni 8%	Authorized: 750,000 (max) Uncirculated: 176,446 D Proof: 257,173 S	2014		
$1	National Baseball Hall of Fame dollar	Baseball glove	Baseball	Ag 90%, Cu 10%	Authorized: 400,000 (max) Uncirculated: 131,924 P Proof: 268,076 P	2014		
$5	National Baseball Hall of Fame half eagle	Baseball glove	Baseball	Au 90%, Ag 6%, Cu 4%	Authorized: 50,000 (max) Uncirculated: 17,677 W Proof: 32,427 W	2014		
50¢	50th Anniversary Gold Kennedy half dollar	Kennedy half dollar obverse: Portrait of John F. Kennedy	Kennedy half dollar reverse: Eagle surrounded by 50 stars	Au 99.99%	Authorized: 75,000 (max) Proof: ---- W	2014		
$10	Florence Harding eagle	Florence Harding	Items relating to Mrs. Harding's life: ballots and ballot box, camera, torch, and initials referencing World War I veterans	Au 99.99%	Authorized: 10,000 (max) Uncirculated: 1,944 W Proof: 2,372 W	2014 – 2015		
$10	Grace Coolidge eagle	Grace Coolidge	U.S.A. spelled out in American Sign Language in front of the White House	Au 99.99%	Authorized: 10,000 (max) Uncirculated: 1,949 W Proof: 2,315 W	2014 – 2015		
$10	Lou Hoover eagle	Lou Hoover	Radio commemorating Mrs. Hoover's radio address of 19 April 1929, the first by a First Lady	Au 99.99%	Authorized: 10,000 (max) Uncirculated: 1,936 W Proof: 2,392 W	2014 – 2015		
$10	Eleanor Roosevelt eagle	Eleanor Roosevelt	A hand lighting a candle, symbolizing her life's work and the global impact of her humanitarian initiatives	Au 99.99%	Authorized: 10,000 (max) Uncirculated: 1,886 W Proof: 2,377 W	2014 – 2015		

=== Circulating coins ===
Face value	Coin	Obverse design	Reverse design	Mintage	Obverse	Reverse
25¢	Great Smoky Mountains National Park quarter	George Washington	A log cabin in the forest with a hawk in flight	Circulation: 73,200,000 P 99,400,000 D Uncirculated: 1,360,780 S Proof: 828,186 S (clad); 586,325 S (silver)		
25¢	Shenandoah National Park quarter	George Washington	A hiker at the summit of Stony Man Trail	Circulation: 112,800,000 P 197,800,000 D Uncirculated: 1,239,320 S Proof: 828,186 S (clad); 586,325 S (silver)		
25¢	Arches National Park quarter	George Washington	Delicate Arch with the La Sal Mountains in the distance	Circulation: 214,200,000 P 251,400,000 D Uncirculated: 1,203,100 S Proof: 828,186 S (clad); 586,325 S (silver)		
25¢	Great Sand Dunes National Park and Preserve quarter	George Washington	A father and son playing on the banks of a creek, with sand dunes and the Sangre de Cristo Mountains in the background	Circulation: 159,600,000 P 171,800,000 D Uncirculated: 1,146,000 S Proof: 828,186 S (clad); 586,325 S (silver)		
25¢	Everglades National Park quarter	George Washington	An anhinga on a willow, and a roseate spoonbill wading in the water	Circulation: 157,601,200 P 142,400,000 D Uncirculated: 1,139,140 S Proof: 828,186 S (clad); 586,325 S (silver)		
50¢	50th anniversary Kennedy silver half dollar ^{[Note 2]}	John F. Kennedy	Eagle surrounded by 50 stars	Authorized: 300,000 (max number of sets containing each coin) Uncirculated: 225,000 D 225,000 S (enhanced) Proof: 225,000 P 225,000 W (reverse cameo)		
50¢	50th anniversary Kennedy high relief half dollar ^{[Note 2]}	John F. Kennedy	Eagle surrounded by 50 stars	Authorized: 200,000 (max number of sets containing each coin) Uncirculated: 200,000 P 200,000 D		
$1	Native American "Hospitality" dollar ^{[Note 1]}	Sacagawea	Native American man clasping a ceremonial pipe while his wife holds a plate of provisions, including fish, corn, roots and gourds	Uncirculated: 5,600,000 P 3,080,000 D 50,000 D (enhanced) Proof: 665,100 S	see article: Sacagawea dollar	
$1	Warren G. Harding dollar ^{[Note 1]}	Warren G. Harding	Statue of Liberty	Uncirculated: 6,160,000 P 3,780,000 D Proof: 1,373,569 S		
$1	Calvin Coolidge dollar ^{[Note 1]}	Calvin Coolidge	Statue of Liberty	Uncirculated: 4,480,000 P 3,780,000 D Proof: 1,373,569 S		
$1	Herbert Hoover dollar ^{[Note 1]}	Herbert Hoover	Statue of Liberty	Uncirculated: 4,480,000 P 3,780,000 D Proof: 1,373,569 S		
$1	Franklin D. Roosevelt dollar ^{[Note 1]}	Franklin D. Roosevelt	Statue of Liberty	Uncirculated: 4,760,000 P 3,920,000 D Proof: 1,373,569 S		

== 2015 ==
=== Non-circulating coins ===
Face value	Coin	Obverse design	Reverse design	Composition	Mintage	Available	Obverse	Reverse
50¢	U.S. Marshals Service 225th Anniversary half dollar	Present day and old west US Marshal	Lady Justice	Cu 92%, Ni 8%	Authorized: 750,000 (max) Uncirculated: 38,149 D Proof: 76,549 S	2015		
$1	U.S. Marshals Service 225th Anniversary dollar	US Marshals Service Star	Old West US Marshal	Ag 90%, Cu 10%	Authorized: 500,000 (max) Uncirculated: 38,149 P Proof: 124,329 P	2015		
$5	U.S. Marshals Service 225th Anniversary half eagle	US Marshals Service Star	Eagle With Draped Flag	Au 90%, Ag 6%, Cu 4%	Authorized: 100,000 (max) Uncirculated: 6,743 W Proof: 24,959 W	2015		
$1	March of Dimes dollar	President Franklin D. Roosevelt and Dr. Jonas Salk	Baby in a Hand	Ag 90%, Cu 10%	Authorized: 500,000 (max) Uncirculated: 24,742 P Proof: 132,030 P	2015		
$10	Bess Truman eagle	Bess Truman	A wheel on railroad tracks, symbolizing Mrs. Truman's support for her husband on his 1948 whistle stop tour	Au 99.99%	Authorized: 10,000 (max) Uncirculated: ---- W Proof: ---- W	2015 – 2017		
$10	Mamie Eisenhower eagle	Mamie Eisenhower	Hand holding an I Like Mamie badge	Au 99.99%	Authorized: 10,000 (max) Uncirculated: ---- W Proof: ---- W	2015 – 2017		
$10	Jacqueline Kennedy eagle	Jacqueline Kennedy	Saucer magnolia flower (planted by Mrs. Kennedy beside the John F. Kennedy Eternal Flame) overlaid on an image of the world	Au 99.99%	Authorized: 30,000 (max) Uncirculated: ---- W Proof: ---- W	2015 – 2017		
$10	Lady Bird Johnson eagle	Lady Bird Johnson	Jefferson Memorial, Washington Monument and flowers in reference to Mrs. Johnson's efforts in the beautification and conservation of America	Au 99.99%	Authorized: 10,000 (max) Uncirculated: ---- W Proof: ---- W	2015 – 2017		

=== Circulating coins ===
Face value	Coin	Obverse design	Reverse design	Mintage	Obverse	Reverse
10¢	March of Dimes dime ^{[Note 2]}	Franklin D. Roosevelt	Torch with branches of olive and oak	Authorized: 75,000 (max) Proof: 74,430 P (reverse cameo silver); 74,430 W (silver)		
25¢	Homestead National Monument of America quarter	George Washington	A log cabin, two ears of corn, and a water pump, representing shelter, food, and water	Circulation: 214,400,000 P 248,600,000 D Uncirculated: 1,135,460 S Proof: 831,503 S (clad) ---- S (silver)		
25¢	Kisatchie National Forest quarter	George Washington	A wild turkey in flight over bluestem grass, with long leaf pines in the background	Circulation: 397,200,000 P 379,600,000 D Uncirculated: 1,081,560 S Proof: 831,503 S (clad); 443,630 S (silver)		
25¢	Blue Ridge Parkway quarter	George Washington	A short stretch of the Blue Ridge Parkway, with flowering dogwood in the foreground	Circulation: 325,616,000 P 505,200,000 D Uncirculated: 1,049,500 S Proof: 831,503 S (clad); 443,630 S (silver)		
25¢	Bombay Hook National Wildlife Refuge quarter	George Washington	A great blue heron, with a great egret behind it, in a salt marsh	Circulation: 275,000,000 P 206,400,000 D Uncirculated: 923,960 S Proof: 831,503 S (clad); 443,630 S (silver)		
25¢	Saratoga National Historical Park quarter	George Washington	A close-up of John Burgoyne surrendering his sword to Horatio Gates	Circulation: 223,000,000 P 215,800,000 D Uncirculated: 888,380 S Proof: 831,503 S (clad); 443,630 S (silver)		
$1	Native American "Construction" dollar ^{[Note 1]}	Sacagawea	Mohawk ironworkers	Uncirculated: 2,800,000 P 2,240,000 D 90,000 W (enhanced) Proof: 1,050,166 S	see article: Sacagawea dollar	
$1	Harry S. Truman dollar ^{[Note 1]}	Harry S. Truman	Statue of Liberty	Uncirculated: 4,900,000 P 3,500,000 D Proof: 1,271,377 S 17,000 P (reverse cameo)		
$1	Dwight D. Eisenhower dollar ^{[Note 1]}	Dwight D. Eisenhower	Statue of Liberty	Uncirculated: 4,900,000 P 3,645,998 D Proof: 1,271,377 S 17,000 P (reverse cameo)		
$1	John F. Kennedy dollar ^{[Note 1]}	John F. Kennedy	Statue of Liberty	Uncirculated: 6,160,000 P 5,180,000 D Proof: 1,271,377 S 17,000 P (reverse cameo)		
$1	Lyndon B. Johnson dollar ^{[Note 1]}	Lyndon B. Johnson	Statue of Liberty	Uncirculated: 7,840,000 P 4,200,000 D Proof: 1,271,377 S 17,000 P (reverse cameo)		

== 2016 ==
=== Non-circulating coins ===
Face value	Coin	Obverse design	Reverse design	Composition	Mintage	Available	Obverse	Reverse
$1	Mark Twain dollar	Mark Twain smoking a pipe	Characters from several Mark Twain novels	Ag 90%, Cu 10%	Authorized: 500,000 (max) Uncirculated: ---- P Proof: ---- P	2016		
$5	Mark Twain half eagle	Mark Twain portrait	Steam boat with paddlewheel	Au 90%, Ag 6%, Cu 4%	Authorized: 100,000 (max) Uncirculated: 5,693 W Proof: 13,266 W	2016		
50¢	National Park Service Centennial half dollar	National Park Service	National Park Service Logo	Cu 92%, Ni 8%	Authorized: 500,000 (max) Uncirculated: ---- D Proof: ---- S	2016		
$1	National Park Service Centennial dollar	Old Faithful Geyser	Heritage Culture Pride; National Park Service Logo	Ag 90%, Cu 10%	Authorized: 750,000 (max) Uncirculated: ---- P Proof: ---- P	2016		
$5	National Park Service Centennial	John Muir and Theodore Roosevelt	National Park Service Logo	Au 90%, Ag 6%, Cu 4%	Authorized: 100,000 (max) Uncirculated: ---- W Proof: ---- W	2016		
10¢	Centennial Mercury dime	Mercury dime obverse	Mercury dime reverse	Au 99.99%	Authorized: 125,000 (max) Uncirculated: ---- W	2016		
25¢	Centennial Standing Liberty quarter	Standing Liberty quarter obverse	Standing Liberty quarter reverse	Au 99.99%	Authorized: 100,000 (max) Uncirculated: ---- W	2016		
50¢	Centennial Walking Liberty half dollar	Walking Liberty half dollar obverse	Walking Liberty half dollar reverse	Au 99.99%	Authorized: 70,000 (max) Uncirculated: ---- W	2016		
$10	Patricia Nixon eagle	Pat Nixon	People standing hand-in-hand surrounding a globe, symbolizing Mrs. Nixon's commitment to volunteerism	Au 99.99%	Authorized: 10,000 (max) Uncirculated: ---- W Proof: ---- W	2016		
$10	Elizabeth Ford eagle	Elizabeth Ford	Young woman ascending a staircase, representing Mrs. Ford's openness and advocacy regarding addiction, breast cancer and women's rights	Au 99.99%	Authorized: 10,000 (max) Uncirculated: ---- W Proof: ---- W	2016		
$10	Nancy Reagan eagle	Nancy Reagan	Mrs. Reagan with two children wearing "Just Say No" T-shirts	Au 99.99%	Authorized: 15,000 (max) Uncirculated: ---- W Proof: ---- W	2016		

=== Circulating coins ===
Face value	Coin	Obverse design	Reverse design	Mintage	Obverse	Reverse
25¢	Shawnee National Forest quarter	George Washington	Camel Rock and natural vegetation with a red-tailed hawk overhead	Circulation: 155,600,000 P 151,800,000 D Uncirculated: 1,029,340 S Proof: 654,516 S (clad); 474,207 S (silver)		
25¢	Cumberland Gap National Historical Park quarter	George Washington	A frontiersman gazing across the Cumberland Mountains to the West	Circulation: 215,400,000 P 223,200,000 D Uncirculated: 975,220 S Proof: 654,516 S (clad); 474,207 S (silver)		
25¢	Harpers Ferry National Historical Park quarter	George Washington	John Brown's Fort	Circulation: 434,630,000 P 424,000,000 D Uncirculated: 976,420 S Proof: 654,516 S (clad); 474,207 S (silver)		
25¢	Theodore Roosevelt National Park quarter	George Washington	Theodore Roosevelt on horseback near the Little Missouri River	Circulation: 231,600,000 P 232,200,000 D Uncirculated: 976,760 S Proof: 654,516 S (clad); 474,207 S (silver)		
25¢	Fort Moultrie quarter	George Washington	William Jasper returning the regimental flag to the ramparts of Fort Moultrie	Circulation: 154,400,000 P 142,200,000 D Uncirculated: 863,860 S Proof: 654,516 S (clad); 474,207 S (silver)		
$1	Native American "Code Talkers" dollar ^{[Note 1]}	Sacagawea	A Brodie helmet from WWI, an M1 helmet of WWII, and two feathers which combine to form a V	Uncirculated: 2,800,000 P 2,100,000 D 75,000 S (enhanced) Proof: 923,414 S	see article: Sacagawea dollar	
$1	Richard Nixon dollar ^{[Note 1]}		Statue of Liberty	Uncirculated: 5,460,000 P 4,340,000 D Proof: ---- S		
$1	Gerald Ford dollar ^{[Note 1]}		Statue of Liberty	Uncirculated: 5,460,000 P 5,040,000 D Proof: ---- S		
$1	Ronald Reagan dollar ^{[Note 1]}		Statue of Liberty	Uncirculated: 7,140,000 P 5,880,000 D Proof: ---- S ---- S (reverse cameo)		

== 2017 ==
=== Non-circulating coins ===
Face value	Coin	Obverse design	Reverse design	Composition	Mintage	Available	Obverse	Reverse
$1	Lions Clubs International Centennial dollar	Melvin Jones, founder	Male and female lion	Ag 90%, Cu 10%	Authorized: 400,000 (max) Uncirculated: ---- P Proof: ---- P	2017		
50¢	Boys Town Centennial half dollar	Boys Town Monument	Boys Town Home	Cu 92%, Ni 8%	Authorized: 300,000 (max) Uncirculated: ---- D Proof: ---- S	2017		
$1	Boys Town Centennial dollar	Girl sitting under an oak branch	Children playing under an oak tree	Ag 90%, Cu 10%	Authorized: 350,000 (max) Uncirculated: ---- P Proof: ---- P	2017		
$5	Boys Town Centennial half eagle	Fr Edward Flanagan	Hand holding a young oak tree	Au 90%, Ag 6%, Cu 4%	Authorized: 50,000 (max) Uncirculated: ---- W Proof: ---- W	2017		
$100	American Liberty 225th Anniversary union	Lady Liberty	Soaring American Bald Eagle	Au 99.99%	Authorized: 100,000 (max) Proof: ---- W	2017 – present		

=== Circulating coins ===
Face value	Coin	Obverse design	Reverse design	Mintage	Obverse	Reverse
1¢	US Mint 225th anniversary penny	Abraham Lincoln	Union shield	Circulation: 4,361,220,000 P Uncirculated: 225,000 S (enhanced)		
5¢	US Mint 225th anniversary nickel ^{[Note 2]}	Thomas Jefferson	Monticello	Uncirculated: 225,000 S (enhanced)		
10¢	US Mint 225th anniversary dime ^{[Note 2]}	Franklin D. Roosevelt	Torch with branches of olive and oak	Uncirculated: 225,000 S (enhanced)		
25¢	Effigy Mounds National Monument quarter	George Washington	An aerial view of effigy mounds in the Marching Bear Group	Circulation: 271,200,000 P 210,800,000 D Uncirculated: 919,620 S 225,000 S (enhanced) Proof: 629,997 S (clad); 466,711 S (silver)		
25¢	Frederick Douglass National Historic Site quarter	George Washington	Frederick Douglass seated at a writing desk with his home in the background	Circulation: 184,800,000 P 185,800,000 D Uncirculated: 910,760 S 225,000 S (enhanced) Proof: 629,997 S (clad); 466,711 S (silver)		
25¢	Ozark National Scenic Riverways quarter	George Washington	Alley Mill	Circulation: 203,000,000 P 200,000,000 D Uncirculated: 878,240 S 225,000 S (enhanced) Proof: 629,997 S (clad); 466,711 S (silver)		
25¢	Ellis Island quarter	George Washington	An immigrant family approaching Ellis Island	Circulation: 234,000,000 P 254,000,000 D Uncirculated: 901,780 S 225,000 S (enhanced) Proof: 629,997 S (clad); 466,711 S (silver)		
25¢	George Rogers Clark National Historical Park quarter	George Washington	George Rogers Clark leading his men through the flooded plains approaching Fort Sackville	Circulation: 196,600,000 P 180,800,000 D Uncirculated: 815,540 S 225,000 S (enhanced) Proof: 629,997 S (clad); 466,711 S (silver)		
50¢	US Mint 225th anniversary half dollar ^{[Note 2]}	John F. Kennedy	Eagle surrounded by 50 stars	Uncirculated: 225,000 S (enhanced)		
$1	Native American "Sequoyah" dollar ^{[Note 1]}	Sacagawea	Sequoyah	Uncirculated: 1,820,000 P 1,540,000 D 225,000 S (enhanced) Proof: ---- S	see article: Sacagawea dollar	

== 2018 ==
=== Non-circulating coins ===
Face value	Coin	Obverse design	Reverse design	Composition	Mintage	Available	Obverse	Reverse
$1	World War I Centennial dollar	Soldier holding rifle	Poppies in barbed wire	Ag 90%, Cu 10%	Authorized: 350,000 (max) Uncirculated: ---- P Proof: ---- P	2018		
50¢	Breast Cancer Awareness half dollar	Two Women	Tiger Swallowtail Butterfly	Cu 92%, Ni 8%	Authorized: 750,000 (max) Uncirculated: ---- D Proof: ---- S	2018		
$1	Breast Cancer Awareness dollar	Two Women	Tiger Swallowtail Butterfly	Ag 90%, Cu 10%	Authorized: 400,000 (max) Uncirculated: ---- P Proof: ---- P	2018		
$5	Breast Cancer Awareness half eagle	Two Women	Tiger Swallowtail Butterfly	Au 85%, Cu 14.8%, Zn .2%	Authorized: 50,000 (max) Uncirculated: ---- W Proof: ---- W	2018		
$10	American Liberty 225th Anniversary eagle	Lady Liberty	Soaring American Bald Eagle	Au 99.99%	Proof: ---- W	2018 – present		

=== Circulating coins ===
Face value	Coin	Obverse design	Reverse design	Mintage	Obverse	Reverse
1¢	San Francisco Mint 50th anniversary reverse proof penny ^{[Note 2]}	Abraham Lincoln	Union shield	Proof: 200,000 S		
5¢	San Francisco Mint 50th anniversary reverse proof nickel ^{[Note 2]}	Thomas Jefferson	Monticello	Proof: 200,000 S		
10¢	San Francisco Mint 50th anniversary reverse proof silver dime ^{[Note 2]}	Franklin D. Roosevelt	Torch with branches of olive and oak	Proof: 200,000 S		
25¢	Pictured Rocks National Lakeshore quarter	George Washington	Chapel Rock, with a white pine tree	Circulation: 186,714,000 P 182,600,000 D Uncirculated: ---- S Proof: ---- S (clad) ---- S (silver); 200,000 S (reverse cameo silver)		
25¢	Apostle Islands National Lakeshore quarter	George Washington	Devils Island, with sea caves and the Devils Island Lighthouse, and a kayaker in the foreground	Circulation: 223,200,000 P 213,400,000 D Uncirculated: ---- S Proof: ---- S (clad) ---- S (silver); 200,000 S (reverse cameo silver)		
25¢	Voyageurs National Park quarter	George Washington	A common loon, with a rock cliff in the background	Circulation: 237,400,000 P 197,800,000 D Uncirculated: ---- S Proof: ---- S (clad) ---- S (silver); 200,000 S (reverse cameo silver)		
25¢	Cumberland Island National Seashore quarter	George Washington	A snowy egret, with a salt marsh in the background	Circulation: 138,000,000 P 151,600,000 D Uncirculated: ---- S Proof: ---- S (clad) ---- S (silver); 200,000 S (reverse cameo silver)		
25¢	Block Island National Wildlife Refuge quarter	George Washington	A black-crowned night heron flying over Cow Cove beach, with the North Lighthouse in the background	Circulation: 159,600,000 P 159,600,000 D Uncirculated: ---- S Proof: ---- S (clad) ---- S (silver); 200,000 S (reverse cameo silver)		
50¢	San Francisco Mint 50th anniversary reverse proof silver half dollar ^{[Note 2]}	John F. Kennedy	Eagle surrounded by 50 stars	Proof: 200,000 S		
$1	Native American "Jim Thorpe" dollar ^{[Note 1]}	Sacagawea	Jim Thorpe	Uncirculated: 1,400,000 P 1,400,000 D Proof: ---- S 200,000 S (reverse cameo)	see article: Sacagawea dollar	
$1	American Innovation introductory dollar ^{[Note 1]}	Statue of Liberty		Uncirculated: ---- P ---- D Proof: ---- S		

== 2019 ==
=== Non-circulating coins ===
Face value	Coin	Obverse design	Reverse design	Composition	Mintage	Available	Obverse	Reverse
50¢	Apollo 11 50th Anniversary half dollar	Lunar Footprint	Buzz Aldrin on the Moon	Cu 92%, Ni 8%	Authorized: 750,000 (max) Uncirculated: ---- D Proof: ---- S	2019 – present		
$1	Apollo 11 50th Anniversary dollar	Lunar Footprint	Buzz Aldrin on the Moon	Ag 99.9%	Authorized: 400,000 (max) Uncirculated: ---- P Proof: ---- P	2019 – present		
$1	Apollo 11 50th Anniversary dollar (5oz silver)	Lunar Footprint	Buzz Aldrin on the Moon	Ag 99.9%	Authorized: 100,000 (max) Proof: ---- P	2019 – present		
$5	Apollo 11 50th Anniversary half eagle	Lunar Footprint	Buzz Aldrin on the Moon	Au 90%, Ag 6%, Cu 4%	Authorized: 50,000 (max) Uncirculated: ---- W Proof: ---- W	2019 – present		
50¢	American Legion Centennial half dollar	Two Children	American Flag, Pledge of Allegiance	Cu 92%, Ni 8%	Authorized: 750,000 (max) Uncirculated: ---- D Proof: ---- S	2019 – present		
$1	American Legion 100th Anniversary dollar	American Legion Emblem	American Legion in Paris	Ag 99.9%	Authorized: 400,000 (max) Uncirculated: ---- P Proof: ---- P	2019 – present		
$5	American Legion 100th Anniversary half eagle	American Legion	Eagle/American Legion Emblem	Au 90%, Ag 6%, Cu 4%	Authorized: 50,000 (max) Uncirculated: ---- W Proof: ---- W	2019 – present		

=== Circulating coins ===
Face value	Coin	Obverse design	Reverse design	Mintage	Obverse	Reverse
1¢	"W" Lincoln penny ^{[Note 2]}	Abraham Lincoln	Union shield	Uncirculated: ---- W Proof: ---- W (standard finish) ---- W (reverse cameo)		
25¢	Lowell National Historical Park quarter	George Washington	A mill girl working at a power loom, with the Boott Mill clock tower outside the window	Circulation: ---- P ---- D 2,000,000 W Uncirculated: ---- S Proof: ---- S (clad) ---- S (silver)		
25¢	American Memorial Park quarter	George Washington	A young Chamorro woman at the Flag Circle and Court of Honor	Circulation: ---- P ---- D 2,000,000 W Uncirculated: ---- S Proof: ---- S (clad) ---- S (silver)		
25¢	War in the Pacific National Historical Park quarter	George Washington	American forces coming ashore during the Second Battle of Guam	Circulation: ---- P ---- D 2,000,000 W Uncirculated: ---- S Proof: ---- S (clad) ---- S (silver)		
25¢	San Antonio Missions National Historical Park quarter	George Washington	Elements of the Spanish colonial real coin: arches and a bell symbolizing community, a lion symbolizing Spanish cultural heritage, waves symbolizing the waters of the San Antonio River, and wheat symbolizing farming	Circulation: ---- P ---- D 2,000,000 W Uncirculated: ---- S Proof: ---- S (clad) ---- S (silver)		
25¢	Frank Church–River of No Return Wilderness quarter	George Washington	A drift boat on the Salmon River, with the wilderness in the background	Circulation: ---- P ---- D 2,000,000 W Uncirculated: ---- S Proof: ---- S (clad) ---- S (silver)		
$1	Native American "American Indians in the Space Program" dollar ^{[Note 1]}	Sacagawea	Mary G. Ross and John Herrington	Uncirculated: ---- P ---- P (enhanced) ---- D Proof: ---- S	see article: Sacagawea dollar	
$1	Annie Jump Cannon (Delaware) dollar ^{[Note 1]}	Statue of Liberty	Silhouette of Cannon against a night sky with multiple stars visible	----		
$1	Polio vaccine (Pennsylvania) dollar ^{[Note 1]}	Statue of Liberty	Microscope and a poliovirus	----		
$1	Lightbulb (New Jersey) dollar ^{[Note 1]}	Statue of Liberty	Edison light bulb	----		
$1	Trustees’ Garden (Georgia) dollar ^{[Note 1]}	Statue of Liberty	Hand planting seeds	----		

== Notes ==
^1 Although technically a circulating coin, no dollar coins have been struck for circulation since 2011. Dollar coins are struck for circulation when the economy needs them.

^2 This is a non-circulating variety of a circulating coin.
