= Pete Sessions =

American politician (born 1955)

Member of the U.S. House of Representatives from Texas
- Incumbent
- Assumed office January 3, 2021
- Preceded by: Bill Flores
- Constituency: 17th district
- In office January 3, 1997 – January 3, 2019
- Preceded by: John Bryant
- Succeeded by: Colin Allred
- Constituency: 5th district (1997–2003); 32nd district (2003–2019)

Chair of the House Rules Committee
- In office January 3, 2013 – January 3, 2019
- Preceded by: David Dreier
- Succeeded by: Jim McGovern

Chair of the National Republican Congressional Committee
- In office January 3, 2009 – January 3, 2013
- Leader: John Boehner
- Preceded by: Tom Cole
- Succeeded by: Greg Walden

Personal details
- Born: Peter Anderson Sessions; March 22, 1955 (age 71) Waco, Texas, U.S.
- Party: Republican
- Spouses: Juanita Diaz (m. 1984; div. 2011); Karen Diebel (m. 2012)
- Children: 2
- Relatives: William S. Sessions (father)
- Education: Southwestern University (BS)
- Website: House website Campaign website
- Sessions's voice Sessions supporting the Medical Controlled Substances Transportation Act of 2017. Recorded July 11, 2017

Peter Anderson Sessions (born March 22, 1955) is an American politician who serves in the United States House of Representatives for Texas's 17th congressional district as a member of the Republican Party. He chaired the House Rules Committee from 2013 to 2019 and is a former chair of the National Republican Congressional Committee.

Sessions previously served in Congress from 1997 to 2019, representing districts based in Dallas. He was defeated for reelection by Democrat Colin Allred in 2018. On October 3, 2019, Sessions announced that he was running for Congress again in 2020. He was elected to the 17th district, based in Waco, on November 3, 2020. Sessions is set to become the dean of Texas's congressional delegation in 2027 following the retirement of fellow Representative Lloyd Doggett.

== Early life, education, and business career ==
Pete Sessions was born in Waco, Texas, on March 22, 1955, to Alice June Lewis and William S. Sessions, who served as director of the Federal Bureau of Investigation. He attended Winston Churchill High School and graduated from Southwestern University in 1978. He worked at Southwestern Bell for 16 years and rose to become a district manager for marketing in Dallas. The Boy Scouts of America recognized Sessions as a Distinguished Eagle Scout. He holds a position on the Circle Ten Council of the BSA. His two sons are also active in scouting.

== U.S. House of Representatives ==
=== Elections ===
==== 1997–2019 ====
In 1991, Sessions finished sixth in a special election for the House of Representatives. In 1993, he left his job with Southwestern Bell to again run for Congress, against 5th District incumbent Democratic representative John Bryant. He toured the district with a livestock trailer full of horse manure, claiming that the Clinton Administration's health care plan stank more than the manure. He lost by 2,400 votes. He subsequently became vice president for public policy at the National Center for Policy Analysis (NCPA), a Dallas-based conservative public policy research institute.

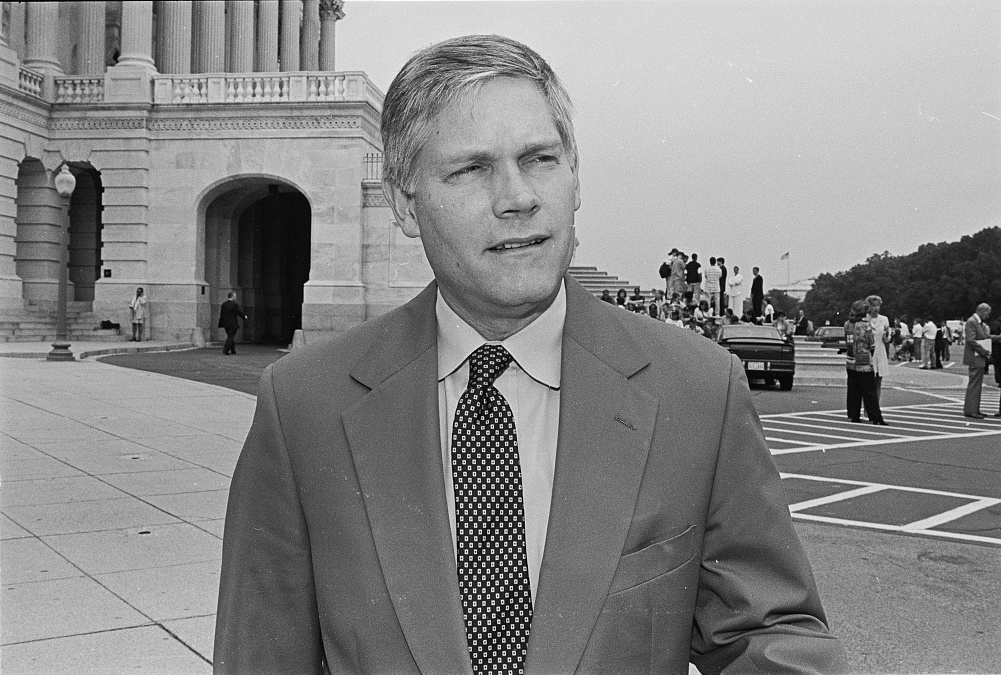
Sessions at the Capitol in 1998

In 1996, when Bryant ran for a Senate seat, Sessions was elected to succeed him in the 5th District, defeating Democratic nominee John Pouland with 47% of the vote. He was reelected in 1998, defeating schoolteacher Victor Morales with 56% of the vote. In 2000, he defeated Regina Montoya Coggins with 54% of the vote. When redistricting after the 2000 census made the 5th slightly more Democratic, he moved to the newly created 32nd District, in which he ran in the 2002 election and defeated Pauline Dixon with 68% of the vote.

In 2004, Sessions defeated 13-term Democratic incumbent Martin Frost, who had moved to the 32nd after redistricting in 2003 eliminated Frost's former district. Sessions won 54–44% in what was considered the most expensive U.S. House race in the nation. According to the Associated Press, "The race also was one of the nastiest, with Frost unearthing a decades-old streaking incident by Sessions in his college days and questioning his commitment to security with an ad featuring the World Trade Center towers in flames. In response, he criticized Frost for booking Peter Yarrow of the 1960s group Peter, Paul and Mary for a fundraiser. Yarrow had faced an indecency with a child charge years earlier."

In 2010, Sessions faced Dallas businessman and attorney Grier Raggio and Libertarian John Jay Myers. The election was initially considered one of the top dark-horse battles in the country, but Sessions was reelected. In 2012, he faced Democratic candidate Katherine Savers McGovern and independent candidate Seth Hollis. Sessions was endorsed by the Dallas Morning News and was reelected. In the 2014 Republican primary, Sessions defeated conservative Katrina Pierson, an African American aligned with the Tea Party movement, polling 28,954 votes (63.6%) to her 16,560 (36.4%). Pierson, originally allied with U.S. senator Ted Cruz, later joined Donald Trump's presidential campaign staff.

In 2016, Sessions polled 49,632 votes (61.4%) to gain renomination in the Republican primary, which had a much greater turnout than in 2014. The runner-up, Russ K. Ramsland of Dallas, received 19,105 votes (23.6%). Paul M. Brown of Richardson received 9,488 (11.7%), and Cherie Myint Roughneen received 2,601 (3.2%).

Sessions lost his bid for reelection in 2018 to Democrat Colin Allred, a lawyer and former professional (NFL) football player.

==== 2020 ====
In October 2019, Sessions announced his candidacy for the 2020 election in Texas's 17th congressional district. While the 17th is about 100 miles (160 km) from his former district, it is based in his boyhood home in Waco. Sessions sold his home in Dallas and bought a home in Waco soon after announcing his candidacy. Sessions's bid received a chilly reception from some Republicans in the district, including the retiring five-term incumbent, Bill Flores. Despite this, Sessions led the field in a crowded 12-way Republican primary–the real contest in this heavily Republican district. He then defeated healthcare executive Renee Swann in a runoff, securing the Republican nomination and all but assuring his return to Congress.

=== Tenure ===
Through August 2017, Sessions voted with his party in 98.8% of votes in the 115th session of Congress and voted in line with President Trump's position in 97.5% of votes.

In November 1997, Sessions was one of 18 House Republicans to co-sponsor a resolution by Bob Barr that sought to launch an impeachment inquiry against President Bill Clinton. The resolution did not specify any charges or allegations. This was an early effort to impeach Clinton, predating the eruption of the Clinton–Lewinsky scandal. That scandal led to a more serious effort to impeach Clinton in 1998. On October 8, 1998, Sessions voted for legislation to open an impeachment inquiry. On December 19, 1998, he voted in favor of all four proposed articles of impeachment against Clinton (only two of which received the majority of votes needed to be adopted).

Sessions voted against the second impeachment of Donald Trump after the 2021 storming of the United States Capitol. He also was among 147 congressional Republicans who voted to overturn the 2020 election results.

In October 2021, Business Insider reported that Sessions had violated the Stop Trading on Congressional Knowledge (STOCK) Act of 2012, a federal transparency and conflict-of-interest law, by failing to properly disclose the purchase of stock in Amazon. Sessions again violated the STOCK Act when, in February 2022, he was late in reporting seven stock trades that he had made during 2021 worth between $7,001 and $105,000.

Sessions unsuccessfully sought the Republican nomination for the October 2023 Speaker of the United States House of Representatives election.

==== Republican Party leadership positions ====
In the 2010 election, while he was chair of the National Republican Congressional Committee, the party gained control of the House with a net gain of 63 seats and 89 new freshman members.

In 2014, Sessions was originally a candidate for the post of House majority leader, to replace Eric Cantor, but withdrew from the internal House Republican Conference election, leaving the field clear for Kevin McCarthy of California.

=== Committee assignments ===
For the 119th Congress:

- Committee on Financial Services
  - Subcommittee on Capital Markets
  - Subcommittee on National Security, Illicit Finance, and International Financial Institutions
- Committee on Oversight and Government Reform
  - Subcommittee on Government Operations (Chairman)
  - Subcommittee on Health Care and Financial Services

=== Caucus membership ===
- Congressional Hindu Caucus– Chairman
- Delivering Outstanding Government Efficiency (DOGE) Caucus- Co-Chairman
- Congressional Scouting Caucus- Co-Chairman
- BIOTech Caucus- Vice Chairman
- Congressional Task Force on Down Syndrome
- Republican Study Committee
- Main Street Caucus
- US Congressional Missile Defense Caucus
- Congressional Friends of Spain Caucus
- Congressional Sportsmen's Caucus
- House Energy Action Team
- Values Action Team
- Congressional Taiwan Caucus
- Northern Border Security Caucus
- Border Security Caucus
- Congressional Fire Services Caucus
- Congressional Caucus on Working Forests
- Congressional Heart and Stroke Coalition
- Conservative Climate Caucus
- Congressional Financial Literacy and Wealth Creation Caucus
- Congressional Azerbaijan Caucus
- Sikh Congressional Caucus
- Congressional Caucus on U.S.-Turkey Relations and Turkish Americans

== Political views ==
=== Foreign policy ===
In 2017, Sessions, as chair of the House Rules Committee, stalled a bill imposing additional sanctions against Russia and Iran from moving to the floor, saying that some parts of the bill, which passed the Senate on a 98–2 vote, could create "huge problems to companies in Dallas, Texas, that I represent" and place them at a competitive disadvantage.

In July 2018, Sessions argued that it was unnecessary to increase federal funding for election security. The U.S. intelligence community had concluded that Russia interfered in the 2016 election and that it was continuing to interfere in election systems as of July 2018.

Sessions and Rudy Giuliani were involved in back-channel talks attempting to persuade Venezuelan President Nicolás Maduro to leave office in 2018. The effort was backed in part by private interests. The negotiations were opposed by White House officials including then-National Security Adviser John Bolton, The Washington Post reported.

=== Economic policy ===
In late 2001 and early 2002, Sessions cosigned letters to two Cabinet members asking them to shut down casinos operated by several Native American tribes. Within 18 months of sending the letters, he received a total of $20,500 from tribes associated with Jack Abramoff. In response to criticism, his office said that he wrote the letters because he believed that gambling is a local issue, falling under his long-held support for federalism.

In 2008, Sessions added a $1.6 million earmark for dirigible research to an appropriations bill. The earmark benefited a Chicago company, Jim G. Ferguson & Associates, that had no experience in government contracting or dirigible research. Former Sessions aide and convicted felon Adrian Plesha was a lobbyist for the firm. In September, Plesha sued Jim G. Ferguson & Associates for non-payment of fees and expenses connected with his lobbying effort on their behalf.

In 2022, Sessions was one of 39 Republicans to vote for the Merger Filing Fee Modernization Act of 2022, an antitrust package that would crack down on corporations for anti-competitive behavior.

Sessions was among the 71 Republicans who voted against final passage of the Fiscal Responsibility Act of 2023 in the House.

In 2025, Sessions voted for the One Big Beautiful Bill Act, which the Congressional Budget Office estimated would add $2.8 trillion to the national deficit.

=== Magic ===
In March 2016, Sessions introduced a House resolution to "recognize magic as a rare and valuable art form and national treasure."

=== Cannabis ===
In 2024, Sessions called THC “addictive” and “dangerous to the health and growth of every American.” Sessions opposed allowing states to determine their own policies regarding the legality of cannabis and the regulation of legal cannabis markets. As chair of the House Rules Committee, he repeatedly stifled proposed amendments relaxing federal laws against cannabis, including one that would have allowed medical marijuana access to veterans in states where the drug is legal.

=== Military and police ===
Sessions supported the 1033 program, under which the U.S. military transfers surplus military equipment to local law enforcement agencies; the program is controversial because of its association with militarization of police. In 2015 and 2017, he cosponsored Republican legislation to reverse the Obama administration's restrictions on the 1033 program.

=== Hurricane aid ===
In 2012, Sessions voted against disaster relief for the victims of Hurricane Sandy. In August 2017, in the wake of Hurricane Harvey, which devastated parts of Texas, he called for disaster relief for its victims.

=== Ethics ===
In 2016, Sessions criticized the independent, nonpartisan Office of Congressional Ethics (OCE), calling it "a political witch hunt" and "an outside process that's very controversial, is not working well and is highly unpopular because of its original mandate and jurisdiction is hugely flawed." In 2017, he publicly defended a House Republican plan to dismantle the OCE; the plan was abandoned after a public uproar. Sessions is opposed to banning members of Congress from trading stocks.

=== Environment ===
In 2017, Sessions sponsored a bill to delay for nine years the full implementation of 2015 ozone standards set by the Environmental Protection Agency under the Obama administration; the bill passed the House, largely on party lines.

Sessions supported the North Texas Invasive Species Barrier Act of 2014, a bill that would exempt the North Texas Municipal Water District (NTMWD) from prosecution under the Lacey Act for transferring water containing invasive species from Oklahoma to Texas. The Lacey Act protects plants and wildlife by creating civil and criminal penalties for various violations, including transferring invasive species across state borders. Sessions argued that the bill was necessary to prevent "more than 1.5 million customers of the North Texas Municipal Water District" from facing "restricted access to water as a result of the discovery of invasive species in Lake Texoma."

=== Orlando shooting ===
Sessions drew controversy in 2016 when he asserted that the site of the Pulse nightclub in Orlando, the scene of a terrorist mass shooting, was not a gay club.

=== Healthcare ===
Sessions opposes abortion and supports defunding Planned Parenthood.

Sessions favors repealing the Patient Protection and Affordable Care Act (ACA or "Obamacare"). He supported the March 2017 version of the American Health Care Act, the House Republicans' replacement for the ACA. On May 4, 2017, he voted to repeal the ACA and pass the American Health Care Act.

=== Race ===
In September 2010, Sessions remarked after watching the Princeton University men's basketball team, "How often can you go see a bunch of white guys play basketball?" He also reportedly said that the players stayed entirely below the rim. The comments were described as an allusion to the phrase "White Men Can't Jump", and were called inappropriate by New Jersey Representative Bill Pascrell.

Less than two weeks after his "white guys" comments, Sessions made controversial comments about the Democratic Congressional Campaign Committee (DCCC) giving money to and supporting "African Americans like Sanford Bishop. And when you have to retreat back to ... your hard base you're having to make tough decisions."

=== Immigration and citizenship ===
Sessions voted against the DREAM Act in 2010.

Sessions supported Trump's 2017 executive order imposing a temporary ban on immigration from seven predominantly Muslim nations, saying, "Just as President Obama suspended the refugee program in 2011 for six months, the Trump administration is working to protect national security by making adjustments in the refugee vetting process. It is critical that we address the threat of individuals who come to our country to create chaos and threaten our freedom."

In 2017, Sessions suggested that Congress could appropriate funds for part of construction of a U.S.-Mexico border wall demanded by Trump as part of "a Republican-only bill" to continue funding the government.

=== Ties to Allen Stanford ===
Sessions came under scrutiny for his personal ties to disgraced banker Allen Stanford, who in 2012 was convicted of orchestrating a $7 billion Ponzi scheme. Sessions received over $44,000 in political contributions from Stanford and his associates. He also took multiple trips to Fire Island and to the Caribbean to attend Stanford-sponsored events; these trips included private travel on Stanford's fleet of jets and accommodations. In 2014, VICE News obtained records from Stanford's internal files that indicated that in 2007 and 2008, before the scandal came to light, Sessions had intervened on Stanford's behalf with the Treasury Department's Office of Foreign Assets Control, allowing Stanford to bypass certain Cuban embargo restrictions. Also, in 2004, Sessions and two other Republican representatives, Bob Ney and John E. Sweeney, wrote to Venezuelan banking regulators, "vouching for Stanford's character when Stanford was trying to obtain a charter to open a bank in the country, at a time when regulators there were reluctant because of reports they had received that Stanford was running a Ponzi scheme and engaged in money laundering."

=== Legislative strategy ===
In early February 2009, Sessions made the following comment about the Republican Party legislative strategy in the House of Representatives: "Insurgency, we understand perhaps a little bit more because of the Taliban. And that is that they went about systematically understanding how to disrupt and change a person's entire processes." He continued: "I'm not trying to say the Republican Party is the Taliban.... I'm saying an example of how you go about [it] is to change a person from their messaging to their operations to their front-line message. And we need to understand that insurgency may be required when the other side, the House leadership, does not follow the same commands, which we entered the game with."

=== Countrywide Financial loan ===
In January 2012, it was reported that Sessions received a so-called "VIP" or "Friends of Angelo" loan in 2007 from troubled mortgage lender Countrywide Financial, which was granted at a lower interest rate than was available to the public. Former Countrywide CEO Angelo Mozilo created the program to boost the company's standing with politicians, celebrities and well-connected business figures. Sessions received a $1 million loan from Countrywide at below-market rates, which he never declared in financial disclosures. His name and those of other legislators who received similar loans subsequently appeared in a House Committee on Oversight and Government Reform's ethics investigation into improper gifts. He was cleared of any wrongdoing by the House Committee on Oversight and Government Reform when its investigation found he did not receive any preferential treatment or a below-market interest rate on his mortgage from Countrywide.

=== Other ===
In 2008, Sessions introduced legislation that created a commemorative silver dollar coin celebrating the centennial of the Boy Scouts of America. The bill passed the House on a 403–8 vote and the Senate unanimously; it was signed into law by President George W. Bush.

== Connection to Ukraine influence investigation ==
On October 10, 2019, the Texas Tribune, among other news outlets, reported that Sessions was identifiable as "Congressman-1" in an indictment by the Southern District of New York charging Lev Parnas and Igor Fruman with illegal campaign contributions aimed at removing former U.S. ambassador to Ukraine Marie L. Yovanovitch. In 2018, after meeting with Parnas and Fruman, Sessions authored a letter in his capacity as House Rules Committee chair calling for Yovanovitch's removal. On October 15, The Washington Post reported that the grand jury investigating the matter had issued subpoenas to Sessions, with which his spokesperson said he would cooperate. Sessions denied that he took any action as a result of his meetings with Parnas and Fruman.

== Personal life ==
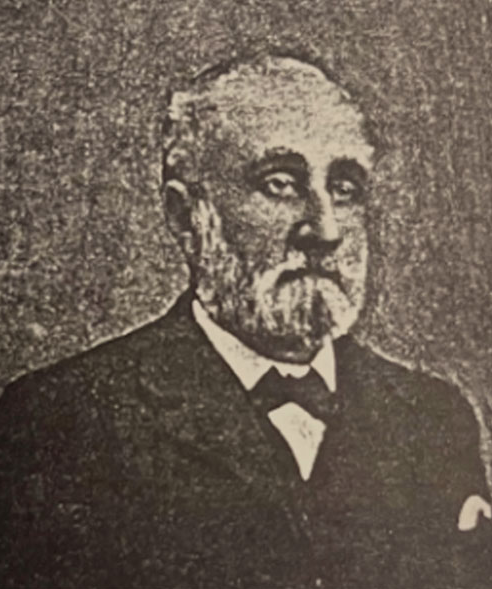
Richard Sessions is one of Sessions' ancestors

In February 1984, Sessions married Juanita "Nete" Diaz; the couple had two sons. In August 2011, they divorced after 27 years of marriage. In August 2012, Sessions married Karen Diebel, a 2010 congressional candidate in Florida and a first Trump administration appointee to the Millennium Challenge Corporation.

Sessions is descended from Richard Sessions, who owned 96 slaves in Chicot County, Arkansas. Richard's land was valued at $75,000 and with inflation his personal wealth was around $113 million. His house was raided during the American Civil War and he was financially unsuccessful after the war.

Pete Sessions is not related to former senator and attorney general Jeff Sessions.

== See also ==
- Lev Parnas and Igor Fruman
- Rudy Giuliani

U.S. House of Representatives
Preceded by John Bryant	Member of the U.S. House of Representatives from Texas's 5th congressional district 1997–2003	Succeeded by Jeb Hensarling
New constituency	Member of the U.S. House of Representatives from Texas's 32nd congressional district 2003–2019	Succeeded by Colin Allred
Preceded by David Dreier	Chair of the House Rules Committee; 2013–2019	Succeeded by Jim McGovern
Preceded by Bill Flores	Member of the U.S. House of Representatives from Texas's 17th congressional district 2021–present	Incumbent
Party political offices
Preceded by Tom Cole	Chair of the National Republican Congressional Committee; 2009–2013	Succeeded by Greg Walden
U.S. order of precedence (ceremonial)
Preceded by Mike Thompson	United States representatives by seniority 31st	Succeeded by Sam Graves
Preceded by Jan Schakowsky	Order of precedence of the United States	Succeeded by Mike Thompson
