= American Veterans Disabled for Life silver dollar =

U.S. commemorative coin

- United States
- Value: 1 United States dollar
- Mass: 26.73 g (412½ gr)
- Diameter: 38.1 mm (1.5 in)
- Thickness: 2.4 mm
- Edge: Reeded
- Composition: 90.0% Silver; 10.0% Copper
- Years of minting: 2010
- Mintage: 281,071 (350,000 authorized)
- Mint marks: W

Obverse
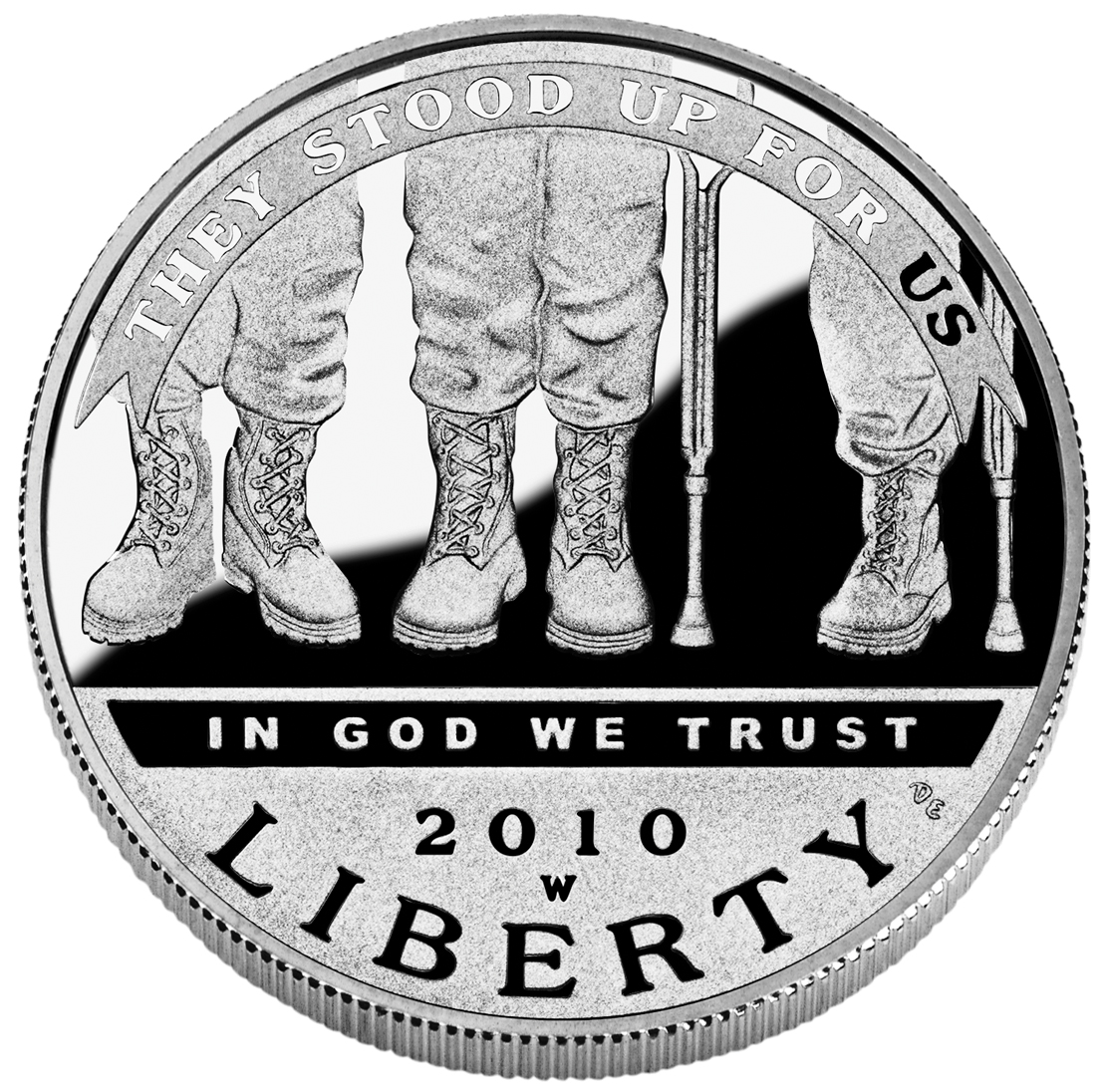
- Design: Legs and boots of three veterans
- Designer: Don Everhart
- Design date: 2010

Reverse
- Design: Forget-me-not flower at the base of a wreath wrapped in a ribbon that cradles and supports clusters of oak branches
- Designer: Joseph Menna
- Design date: 2010

The American Veterans Disabled for Life silver dollar is a commemorative coin issued by the United States Mint in 2010. The obverse of the coin was designed by Don Everhart and featuring the legs and boots of three veterans. The coin's reverse was designed by Joseph Menna and depicts a Forget-me-not flower wrapped in a ribbon cradling and supporting clusters of oak branches, with the forget-me-not flower representing (as has been the case since World War I) those who fought and became disabled, while the oak branches represent strength.

== Release ==
The American Veterans Disabled for Life silver dollar was struck in both proof and uncirculated, with both versions being struck at the West Point Mint. A maximum of 350,000 coins were authorized, although only 281,071 coins (78,301 uncirculated coins and 202,770 proof coins) were struck.

A surcharge of $10 that was added to each coin sold was paid to the Disabled Veterans' LIFE Memorial Foundation. The said surcharge supported the construction of the American Veterans Disabled for Life Memorial in Washington, D.C., which had authorized by Congress a decade earlier.

== See also ==
- List of United States commemorative coins and medals (2010s)
- United States commemorative coins
