= Paul Zane Pilzer =

American economist

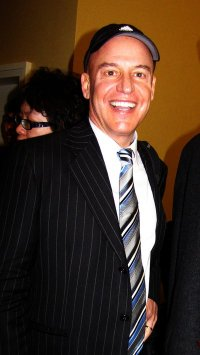
- Born: January 17, 1954 (age 72); Brooklyn, New York
- Occupations: Economist, author, entrepreneur
- Spouse: Lisa Dang Pilzer
- Website: paulzanepilzer.com

Paul Zane Pilzer (born January 17, 1954) is an American economist, New York Times best-selling author, and social entrepreneur. He has written 13 books, the founder of six companies, and has been profiled in more than 100 publications including on the front page of The Wall Street Journal.

== Economic viewpoints ==
Pilzer's 1991 book Unlimited Wealth criticized traditional economic theories as being based on scarcity: that the earth contains a fixed, limited supply of resources and the function of economics (i.e., capitalism, socialism, communism) is to best divide them up. "No wonder," said Pilzer in Unlimited Wealth, "they call economics the 'Dismal Science.'" In contrast, Pilzer offered a new theory called Economic Alchemy based on abundance: that the earth contains unlimited resources because of human ingenuity continually defining new resources and/or learning how to better obtain and use our existing resources. The central equation of Economic Alchemy is W = P x T^{n} : Wealth = Physical Resources times Technology, and T (Technology) has an exponential multiplier effect on itself.

Pilzer began developing Economic Alchemy in 1975 as a graduate student at the Wharton School of the University of Pennsylvania when he theologically could not accept his professor's views that God had created a world of growing population but limited resources. Over the next 15 years, he developed Economic Alchemy while working at Citibank (1976–1981), and served as an appointed economic advisor in Ronald Reagan's Presidential Administration (1983–1988).

Pilzer published his theory of Economic Alchemy in Unlimited Wealth – The Theory and Practice of Economic Alchemy (Crown Publishers, 1990) and in God Wants You To Be Rich – Theology of Economics (Simon & Schuster, 1995, 1997, 2007).

Pilzer has also written about employment, U.S. health benefits, wellness and the sharing economy. In 1985, he testified before a United States congressional hearing and since then has promoted the idea that employees should have personal and portable health insurance coverage independent of their employment but funded pre-tax by their employer. In 1996, he began researching the bifurcation of America based on weight and health. From 1999 to 2014 wrote five books on the economics of obesity, health insurance, preventative medicine, and wellness.

Pilzer has been called the "father of Health Savings Accounts". In 2003, the front page of the Sunday New York Times referred to Pilzer as "the Reagan administration economist turned wellness guru."

Pilzer is currently researching The Sharing Revolution, Consumer Surplus, Gross National Happiness, Universal Basic Income and the impact of the Russian and Chinese economies on the world economy 2023–2033. "While the sharing economy is about using technology to halve the price of what you want to buy," says Pilzer, "the sharing revolution is about doubling the value of what you already own or are about to buy. As explained in Pilzer's The New Roaring Twenties 2023-2033 (BenBella Books, 2023) Uber and Airbnb aren't just half the price of the services (taxis and hotels) they displace, to the consumer they are twice as valuable with up to 100% Consumer Surplus."

== Personal life ==
Pilzer was born in Brooklyn, New York, in 1954 to Polish-Jewish immigrant parents Miriam and Elias Pilzer. He graduated Paul D. Schreiber High School in Port Washington, New York, in 1971. He married Lisa Dang Pilzer (formerly Lisa Dang) on January 17, 2000, and they have four grown children. Pilzer helped start Temple Har Shalom in Park City in 1995 and functioned as a lay rabbi leading services and officiating at functions until a full-time rabbi was hired in 2002.

== Career ==
=== Academics ===
Pilzer earned a BA in journalism from Lehigh University in 1974 at age 20 and an MBA from the Wharton School of the University of Pennsylvania in 1976. He was an adjunct professor at New York University (1979–2000), where he served as chairman of the Department of Real Estate Finance. He received an honorary doctorate in public service from Parker College (now Parker University) in 2004.

Pilzer served as contributing editor from 1979 to 1995 of Real Estate Review published by New York University and Real Estate Finance Journal published by Wharton Business School. He is the author of 16 academic articles. He has served as a lecturer at Moscow State University in Russia (1985–1991), Peking University (2009), and University of Hong Kong (2013).

=== Banking industry ===
Pilzer was employed by Citibank (1976–1981), where he worked in EFT payment technology, government affairs and equity real estate investments. At Citibank he became an officer in 1976 and a vice president in 1980.

=== Real estate industry ===
In 1981, Pilzer co-founded Zane May Interests in Dallas, Texas. It developed 66 projects in the U.S. and the former USSR through 1989. GE Capital featured the company in 1989 in its monthly magazine, Financial Enterprise—The Magazine of GE Capital.

=== Education industry ===
Pilzer was a student-teacher in Computer Science from 1975 to 1976 at the University of Pennsylvania. His graduate thesis was the construction of an interactive teaching machine on a mainframe computer. He wrote on the cover of his thesis: "One day this technology will be used to affordably bring the best teacher of every subject to every student."

In 1989, Pilzer founded educational CD-ROM publisher Zane Publishing and served as its CEO and Publisher until the company became publicly listed in 1995 (NASD:ZANE).

In 2005, Pilzer co-founded The American Academy, an online high school serving high school dropouts in partnership with their local public high school. Pilzer served as President of The American Academy from 2005 to 2008.

In 2010, Pilzer founded Zane Prep, Inc. which distributes Zane Math and other STEM (Science, Technology, Engineering and Math) programs through Zaniac after-school learning centers. By 2016 Zane Prep had opened ten Zaniac Learning Center locations and Pilzer and the company were featured in national publications ranging from The Boston Globe to CNBC to U.S. News & World Report.

In 2016, Pilzer's lifetime commitment to improving education was honored by University of Pennsylvania in Philadelphia. On May 11, 2016, Pilzer gave a Keynote Address at the University of Pennsylvania entitled "Where's the Uber of Education Technology?"

=== Health benefits industry ===
In 1999, Pilzer founded Extend Health to distribute defined contribution portable individual health insurance policies through employers. On January 6, 2012, Extend Health filed an IPO but was acquired by Towers Watson for $435 million on May 29, 2012.

In 2006, Pilzer founded Zane Benefits, Inc. (now PeopleKeep, Inc.) to offer defined contribution employer health benefits to U.S. employers through a Software-As-A-Service product called ZaneHealth. ZaneHealth allows small employers, brokers, and payroll suppliers to offer employees defined contribution health benefits through their own private health insurance exchanges. ZaneHealth helps employers transfer the health insurance risks of their employees to the federal government and has been the subject of front-page articles in The Wall Street Journal USA Today, and The New York Times.

=== Fitness industry ===
As reported in Club Business International magazine in 2008, Pilzer has criticized the fitness industry for catering mostly to fit individuals and missing the opportunity to serve a growing international obese population.

In 2008, Pilzer was a keynote speaker for Planet Fitness and in 2010, Pilzer's wife, Lisa Dang Pilzer, became an area developer franchisee for Planet Fitness in Salt Lake City, Utah.

=== Government service ===
In 1985, Pilzer testified before the U.S. Congress after being implicated in the then-developing savings loan crisis.

Pilzer visited the former Soviet Union in 1969 as a high school chess player and lectured on economic issues at Moscow State University from 1983 to 1989. He attended the Moscow Summit (1988) between President Reagan and Premier Mikhail Gorbachev in 1988.

In 1989, Pilzer wrote Other People's Money – The Inside Story of the S&L Mess (Simon and Schuster, 1989) which was reviewed in The New York Review of Books by economist John Kenneth Galbraith and in The New York Times Book Review by Tony Solomon, former president of the Federal Reserve Bank of New York.

In 1991, Pilzer was a candidate for the U.S. Congress in Texas' 3rd congressional district, where he came in fourth place.

On August 24, 2008, Pilzer spoke in Jakarta, Indonesia at the Gelora Bung Karno Stadium where he was introduced by Indonesian President Susilo Bambang Yudhoyono

In 2009, Pilzer's book The Wellness Revolution was published in China as The Fifth Wave. Pilzer addressed the Chinese nation on December 7, 2009, from the Center Podium in the Main Auditorium of the Great Hall of the People in Beijing, and on December 10, 2009, Pilzer spoke at Peking University.

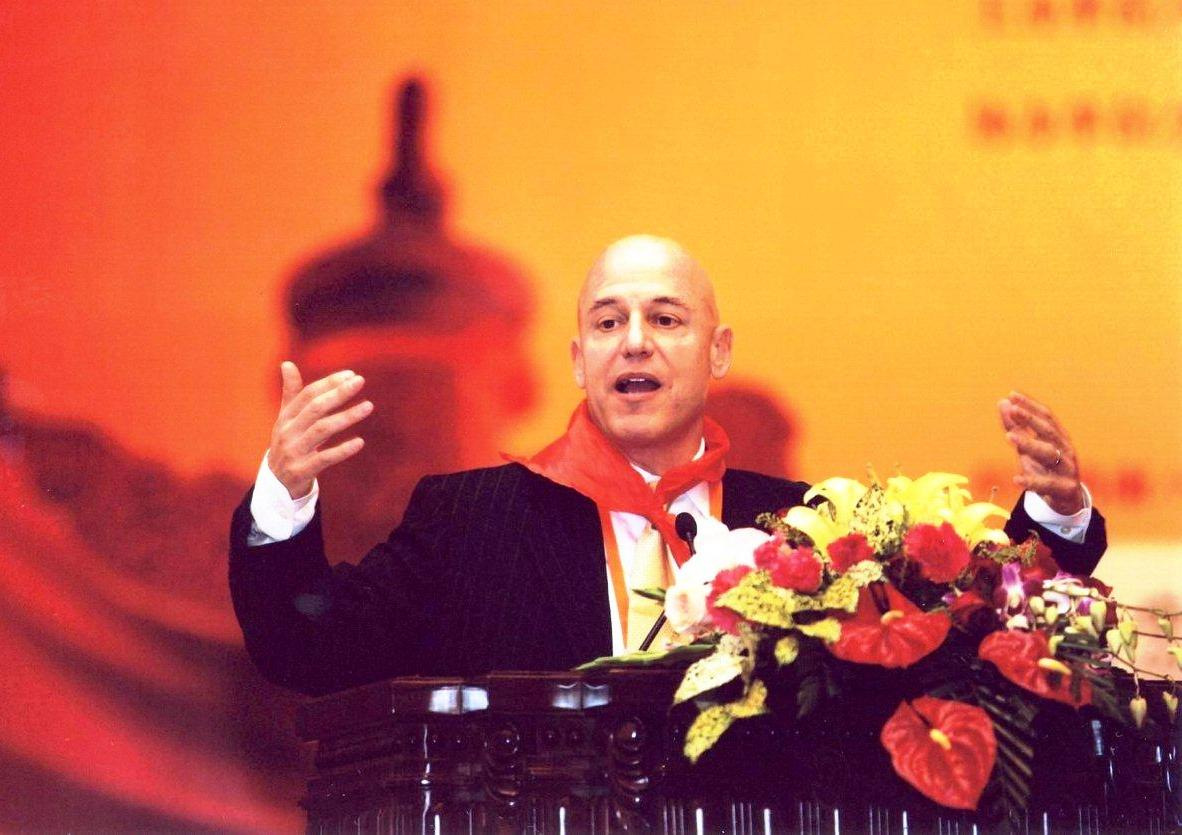
Professor Pilzer addressing from the Great Hall of the People, December 7, 2009.

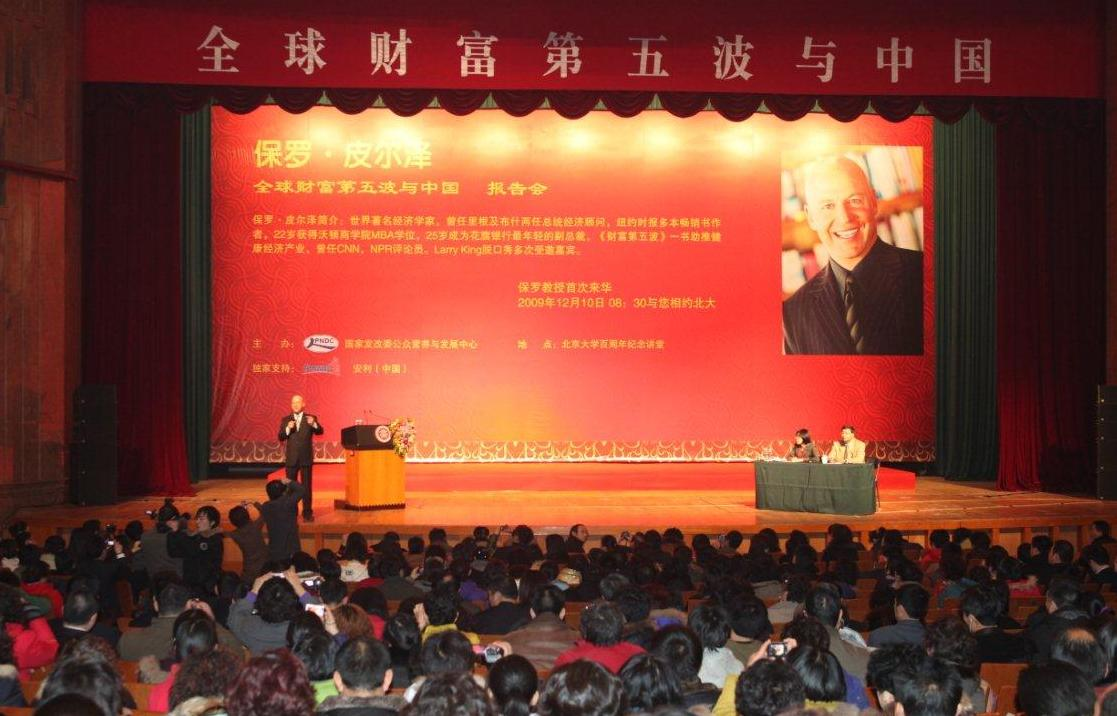
Paul Zane Pilzer Speaking at Peking University, Beijing, December 10, 2009.

In 2013, Pilzer was a lecturer at the University of Hong Kong on Social Entrepreneurship.

In 2014, Pilzer was a lecturer at Nanjing University and gave a lecture on the future of the Chinese economy to more than 10,000 Chinese business professionals in Nanjing, China.

== Books and publications ==
- Other People's Money – The Inside Story of the S&L Mess by Paul Zane Pilzer with Robert Deitz (Simon & Schuster, 1989). Traces the history of savings (deferred gratification for immigrants) through the modern banking system. Reviewed by The New York Times and The Economist magazine.
- Unlimited Wealth – The Theory and Practice of Economic Alchemy by Paul Zane Pilzer (Crown Publishers, 1990). Explains how we live in a world of unlimited physical resources because of rapidly advancing technology. After reading Unlimited Wealth, the late Sam Walton, founder of Walmart, said that he was "amazed at Pilzer's business capacity" and his "ability to put it into layman's terms."
- God Wants You To Be Rich – The Theology of Economics by Paul Zane Pilzer (Simon & Schuster, 1995, 1997, 2007). Explains how the foundation of our economic system is based on our Judeo-Christian heritage. Featured on the front page of The Wall Street Journal and on television shows ranging from 60 Minutes to First Person with Maria Shriver.
- The Next Trillion – Why the wellness industry will exceed the $1 trillion health care (sickness) industry in the next ten years by Paul Zane Pilzer (Video Plus, 1999). The Sunday New York Times on August 3, 2003, referred to Pilzer as "the Reagan administration economist turned wellness guru."
- The Wellness Revolution – How to Make a Fortune in the Next Trillion Dollar Industry by Paul Zane Pilzer (Wiley Press, 2002). Published in 25 languages including special editions in Hebrew and Chinese. Pilzer received an honorary doctorate in public service for writing this book.
- The Fountain of Wealth by Paul Zane Pilzer (Nightingale Conant, 2003). Explains the Six Laws of Economic Alchemy.
- The New Health Insurance Solution – How to Get Cheaper, Better Coverage without a Traditional Employer Plan by Paul Zane Pilzer (Wiley Press, 2005, 2007). This book explains how individuals can now get affordable health insurance independent of their employer. This book has been reported on television by CNN, PBS, and Pat Robertson’s Christian Broadcasting Network.
- The Next Millionaires by Paul Zane Pilzer (Momentum Media, 2006). Explains why the number of U.S. millionaires doubled in the 1990s and how ordinary people can become one of them.
- The New Wellness Revolution – How to Make a Fortune in the Next Trillion Dollar Industry by Paul Zane Pilzer (Wiley Press, 2007). Identifies the newly emerging wellness business and update to The Wellness Revolution (Wiley Press, 2002).
- The Entrepreneurial Challenge – Why This Is The Best Time To Start a New Business, and How To Find The Right Business For You by Paul Zane Pilzer (Nightingale Conant, 2010).
- The End of Employer Provided Health Insurance by Paul Zane Pilzer and Rick Lindquist (Wiley Press, 2014). Explains why U.S. employers and employees should change from group health insurance to defined contribution individual health insurance purchased on state-managed exchanges.
- Becoming an Entrepreneur: How to Succeed When You Don’t Know What You Don’t Know by Paul Zane Pilzer (ZCI, Inc., 2023). This book is a memoir covering Pilzer's life and career in college, Citibank, and as an entrepreneur.
- The New Roaring Twenties 2023-2033: Prosper in Volatile Times by Paul Zane Pilzer with Stephen P. Jarchow (BenBella Books, 2023). This book explains the world economy over the next decade and how the future rests on 12 economic and societal pillars, including Artificial Intelligence, Robots The Gig Economy, Universal Basic Income, Millennials, Consumer Surplus, Free Energy, and what happens in Russia and China.
