= Sam Johnson =

American politician (1930–2020)

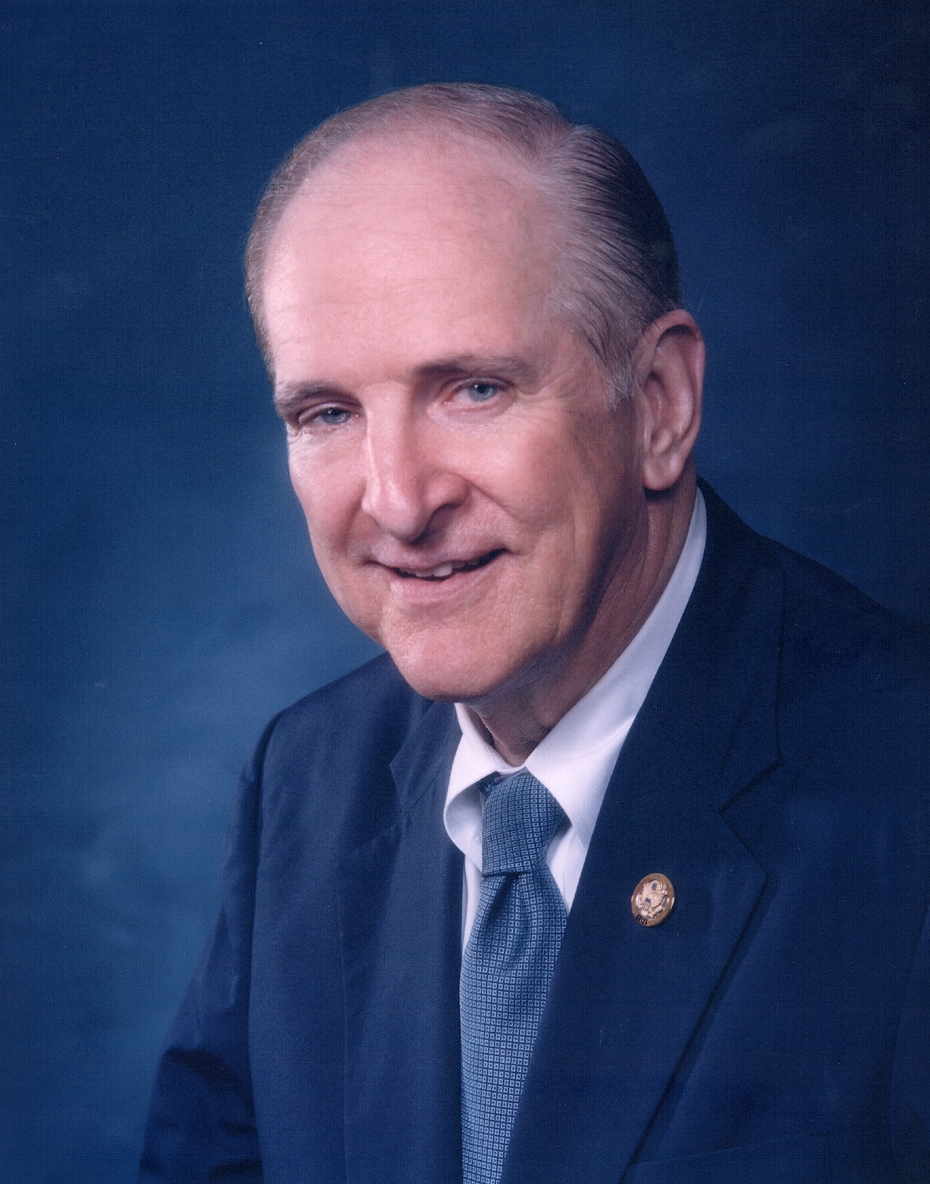

Member of the U.S. House of Representatives from Texas's 3rd district
- In office May 18, 1991 – January 3, 2019 (Note: Johnson's official service begins on the date of the special election, while he was not sworn in until May 22, 1991.)
- Preceded by: Steve Bartlett
- Succeeded by: Van Taylor

Chair of the House Ways and Means Committee
- Acting
- In office October 29, 2015 – November 5, 2015
- Preceded by: Paul Ryan
- Succeeded by: Kevin Brady

Member of the Texas House of Representatives from the 60th district
- In office January 8, 1985 – May 21, 1991
- Preceded by: Frank Eikenburg
- Succeeded by: Brian McCall

Personal details
- Born: Samuel Robert Johnson; October 11, 1930 San Antonio, Texas, U.S.
- Died: May 27, 2020 (aged 89) Plano, Texas, U.S.
- Party: Republican
- Spouse: Shirley Melton (m. 1950; died 2015)
- Children: 3
- Education: Southern Methodist University (BBA); George Washington University (MS)

Military service
- Branch/service: United States Air Force
- Years of service: 1950–1979
- Rank: Colonel
- Unit: 51st Fighter Interceptor Wing; 8th Tactical Fighter Wing
- Commands: 31st Tactical Fighter Wing
- Battles/wars: Korean War; Vietnam War
- Awards: Silver Star (2); Legion of Merit (3); Distinguished Flying Cross; Bronze Star with valor Purple Heart (2)
- Johnson's voice Johnson highlighting teachers in his home district. Recorded May 7, 2002

Samuel Robert Johnson (October 11, 1930 – May 27, 2020) was an American politician who served as the U.S. representative for Texas's 3rd congressional district in Congress from 1991 to 2019. He was a member of the Republican Party. In October and November 2015, he was the acting Chairman of the House Committee on Ways and Means, where he also served as chairman of the Social Security Subcommittee.

Johnson was also a United States Air Force colonel and was a decorated fighter pilot in both the Korean War and the Vietnam War where in the latter he was an American prisoner of war in North Vietnam for nearly seven years. On January 6, 2017, Johnson announced he would not run for reelection in 2018. After the death of Louise Slaughter in March 2018, he became the oldest sitting member of the U.S. House of Representatives. He was the last Korean War veteran to serve in Congress.

== Early life and education ==
Johnson was born October 11, 1930, in San Antonio, Texas, the son of Mima (Nabors) and Samuel Robert Johnson, Jr. Johnson grew up in Dallas and graduated from Woodrow Wilson High School in 1947. Johnson graduated from his hometown Southern Methodist University in 1951, earning a bachelor's degree in business administration. While at SMU, Johnson joined the Delta Chi social fraternity as well as the Alpha Kappa Psi business fraternity.

He attained a master's degree from the Elliott School of International Affairs of the George Washington University in 1976.

== Military career ==
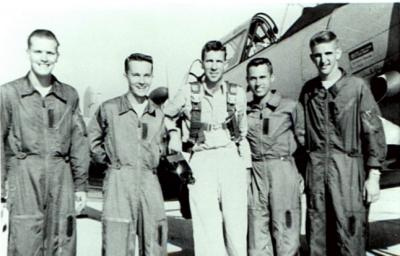
Johnson in flight school in 1951

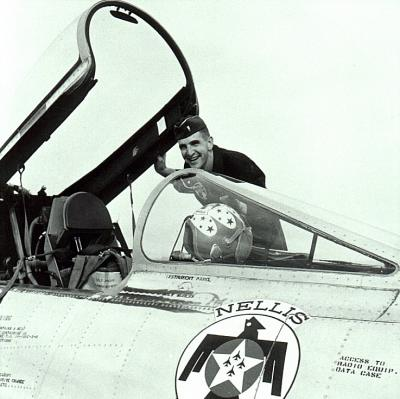
Johnson as a first lieutenant in 1957

Johnson had a 29-year career in the United States Air Force, where he served as director of the Air Force Fighter Weapons School and flew the F-100 Super Sabre with the Air Force Thunderbirds precision flying demonstration team. He commanded the 31st Tactical Fighter Wing at Homestead AFB, Florida, and an air division at Holloman AFB, New Mexico, retiring as a colonel. One of his classmates in flight school was future astronaut Buzz Aldrin. The two remained lifelong friends.

He was a combat veteran of both the Korean and Vietnam Wars as a fighter pilot. During the Korean War, he flew 62 combat missions in the F-86 Sabre and shot down one MiG-15. During the Vietnam War, Johnson flew the F-4 Phantom II.

=== POW ===
On April 16, 1966, while flying his 25th combat mission in Vietnam, he was shot down over North Vietnam and suffered a broken right arm and broken back. He was a prisoner of war for nearly seven years, including 42 months in solitary confinement. During this period, he was repeatedly tortured.

Johnson was part of a group of eleven U.S. military prisoners known as the Alcatraz Gang, a group of prisoners separated from other captives for their resistance to their captors. They were held in "Alcatraz", a special facility about one mile away from the Hỏa Lò Prison, notably nicknamed the "Hanoi Hilton". Johnson, like the others, was kept in solitary confinement, locked nightly in legcuffs in a windowless 3-by-9-foot concrete cell with the light on around the clock. Johnson was released on February 12, 1973, during Operation Homecoming. He recounted the details of his POW experience in his autobiography, Captive Warriors. By the time of his release, he weighed only 120 pounds. His right hand was permanently disabled, and he was left with a noticeable limp for the rest of his life.

In 2018, Johnson donated objects related to his imprisonment to the collection of the Smithsonian Institution's National Museum of American History.

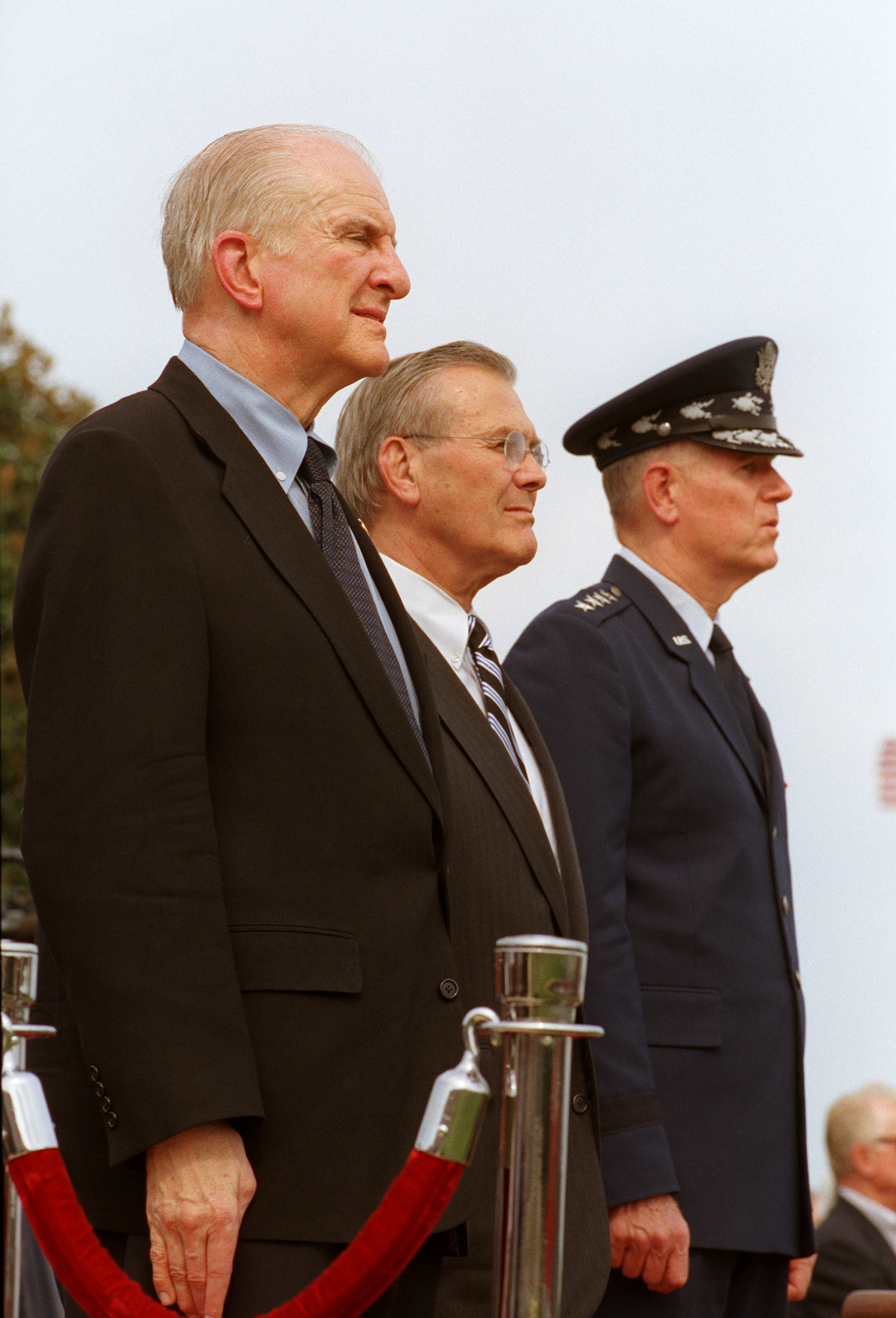
Congressman Sam Johnson with Secretary of Defense Donald Rumsfeld and Chairman of the Joint Chiefs of Staff General Richard B. Myers watch the troops pass in review during the National POW/MIA Recognition Day ceremony at The Pentagon on September 20, 2002.

== Post-military career ==
After his military career, he established a homebuilding business in Plano, Texas.

=== Texas House of Representatives ===
He was elected to the Texas House of Representatives in 1984 and was re-elected three times, serving a total of seven years in the state legislature.

=== U.S. House of Representatives ===
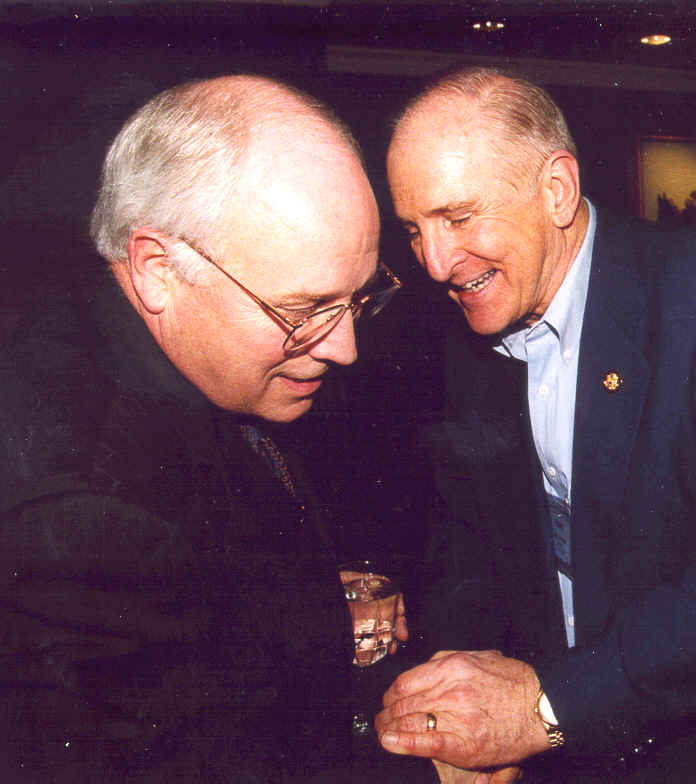
Johnson and Dick Cheney in 2001

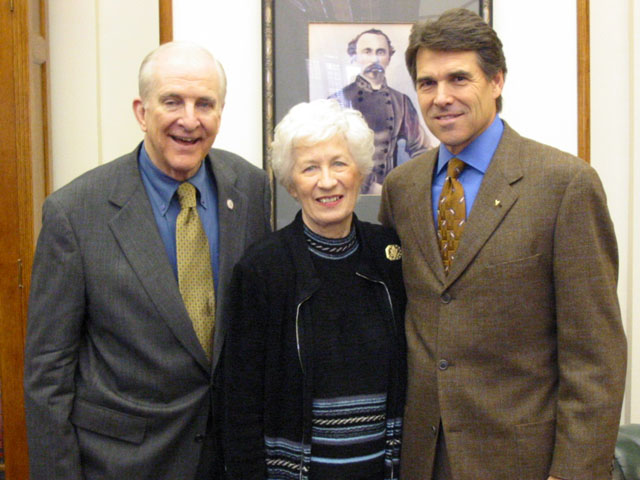
Sam and Shirley Johnson with Governor Rick Perry in 2003

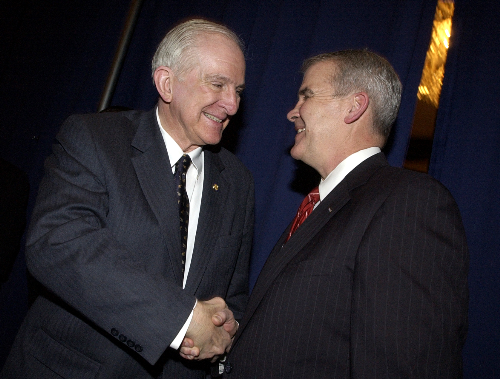
Johnson greeting Oliver North in 2006

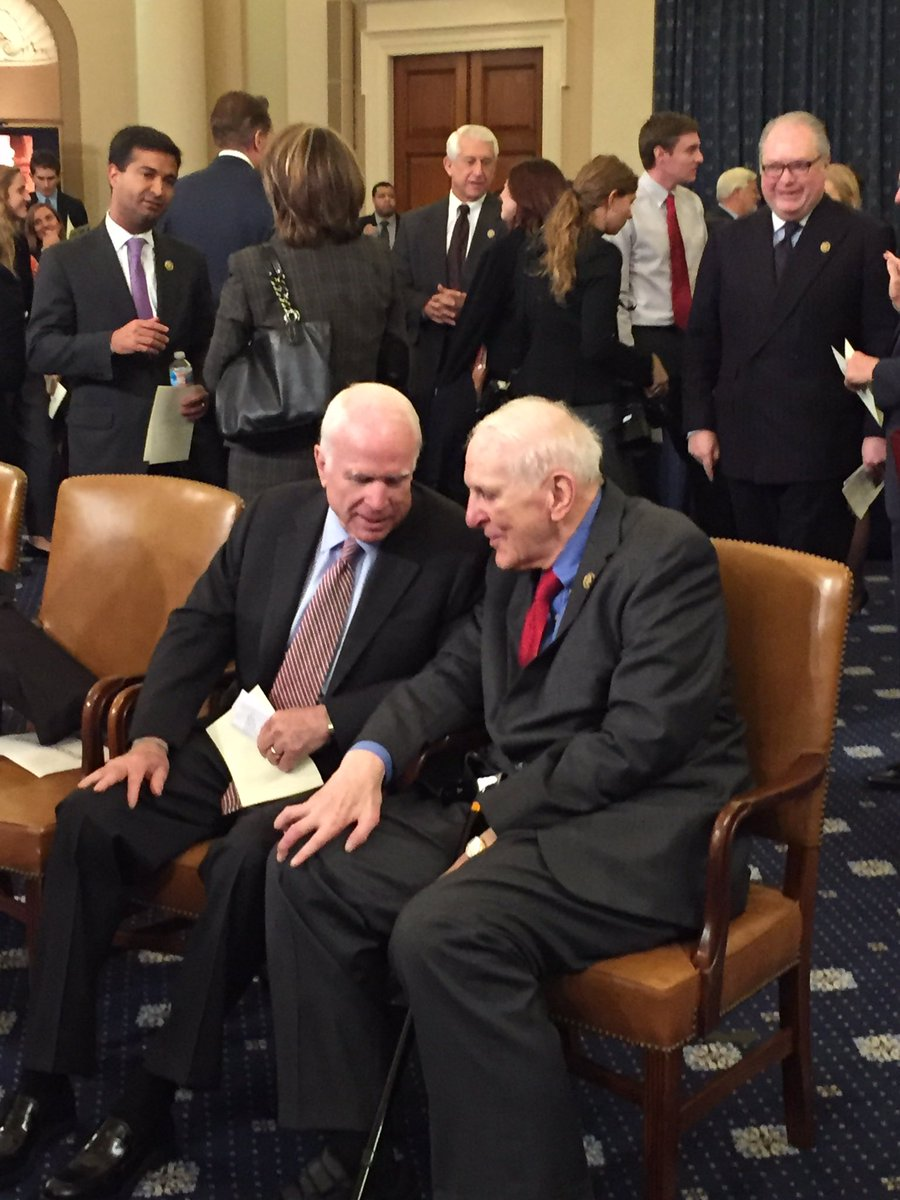
Johnson with fellow POW John McCain in 2016

On May 8, 1991, he was elected to the U.S. House in a special election brought about by eight-year incumbent Steve Bartlett's resignation to become mayor of Dallas. Johnson defeated fellow conservative Republican Thomas Pauken, also of Dallas, 24,004 (52.6 percent) to 21,647 (47.4 percent).

==== Selected elections ====
===== 2004 =====
Johnson ran unopposed by the Republican Party in his district in the 2004 election. Paul Jenkins, an independent, and James Vessels, a member of the Libertarian Party, ran against Johnson. Johnson won overwhelmingly in a highly Republican district. Johnson garnered 86% of the vote (178,099), while Jenkins earned 8% (16,850) and Vessels 6% (13,204).

===== 2006 =====
Johnson ran for re-election in 2006, defeating his opponent Robert Edward Johnson in the Republican primary, 85 to 15 percent.

In the general election, Johnson faced Democrat Dan Dodd and Libertarian Christopher J. Claytor. Both Dodd and Claytor are West Point graduates. Dodd was a U.S. Air Force officer who served in Vietnam, while Claytor served in Operation Southern Watch in Kuwait in 1992. It was only the fourth time that Johnson had faced Democratic opposition.

Johnson retained his seat, taking 62.5% of the vote, while Dodd received 34.9% and Claytor received 2.6%. However, this was by far less a margin of victory then in past years, when Johnson won by 80 percent or more.

===== 2008 =====
Johnson retained his seat in the House of Representatives by defeating Democrat Tom Daley and Libertarian nominee Christopher J. Claytor in the 2008 general election. He won with 60 percent of the vote, an unusually low total for such a heavily Republican district.

===== 2010 =====
Johnson won re-election with 66.3 percent of the vote against Democrat John Lingenfelder (31.3 percent) and Libertarian Christopher Claytor (2.4 percent).

===== 2014 =====
Johnson handily won re-nomination to his twelfth full term in the U.S. House in the Republican primary held on March 4. He polled 30,943 votes (80.5 percent); two challengers, Josh Loveless and Harry Pierce, held the remaining combined 19.5 percent of the votes cast.

===== 2016 =====
Johnson won reelection to his 13th full term in the general election held on November 8, 2016. With 193,684 votes (61.2 percent), he defeated Democrat Adam P. Bell, who polled 109,420 (34.6 percent). Scott Jameson and Paul Blair, the nominees of the Libertarian and Green parties, polled 10,448 votes (3.3 percent) and 2,915 (0.92 percent), respectively.

===== 2018 =====
Three days after being sworn in for his 14th term overall and his 13th full term, Johnson announced he would not run for reelection.

==== Tenure ====
In the House, Johnson was an ardent conservative. By some views, Johnson had the most conservative record in the House for three consecutive years, opposing pork barrel projects of all kinds, voting for more IRAs and against extending unemployment benefits. The conservative watchdog group Citizens Against Government Waste consistently rated him as being friendly to taxpayers. Johnson was a signer of Americans for Tax Reform's Taxpayer Protection Pledge.

Johnson was a member of the conservative Republican Study Committee, and joined Dan Burton, Ernest Istook, and John Doolittle in refounding it in 1994 after Newt Gingrich pulled its funding. He alternated as chairman with the other three co-founders in the late 1990s.

In November 1997, Johnson was one of eighteen Republicans in the House to co-sponsor a resolution by Bob Barr that sought to launch an impeachment inquiry against President Bill Clinton. The resolution did not specify any charges or allegations. This was an early effort to impeach Clinton, predating the eruption of the Clinton–Lewinsky scandal. The eruption of that scandal would ultimately lead to a more serious effort to impeach Clinton in 1998. On October 8, 1998, Johnson voted in favor of legislation that was passed to open an impeachment inquiry. On December 19, 1998, Johnson voted in favor of all four proposed articles of impeachment against Clinton (only two of which received the needed majority of votes needed to be adopted).

On the Ways and Means Committee, he was an early advocate and, then, sponsor of the successful repeal in 2000 of the earnings limit for Social Security recipients. He proposed the Good Samaritan Tax Act to allow corporations to take a tax deduction for charitable giving of food. He chaired the Subcommittee on Employer-Employee Relations, where he encouraged small business owners to expand their pension and benefits for employees. In December 2016, Johnson introduced H.R. 6489, a bill that would increase Social Security payments to low-income beneficiaries while reducing payments to high-income beneficiaries and would gradually add two years to the minimum age for receiving full retirement payments.

Johnson opposed calls for government intervention in the name of energy reform if such reform would hamper the market and or place undue burdens on individuals seeking to earn decent wages. He called for allowing additional drilling for oil in Alaska.

After the death of John McCain, Johnson became the only Vietnam-era prisoner of war serving in Congress.

In December 2017, Johnson signed a letter from Congress (along with 106 other Congress members) to FCC Chairman Ajit Pai supporting his plan to repeal net neutrality ahead of the commission's vote.

=== Committee assignments ===
- Committee on Ways and Means (Interim Chair)
  - Subcommittee on Health
  - Subcommittee on Social Security (Chairman)
- Joint Committee on Taxation

=== Caucus memberships ===
- Immigration Reform Caucus
- International Conservation Caucus
- Public Pension Reform Caucus
- Republican Study Committee
- Sportsmen's Caucus

== Personal life ==
Johnson was married to Shirley L. Melton of Dallas from 1950 until her death on December 3, 2015. They had three children and ten grandchildren. Their son Bob predeceased both his parents in 2013.

Johnson died on May 27, 2020, in Plano, Texas, the city where he lived the last years of his life. The cause of death was not disclosed but a former spokesperson had announced it was unrelated to COVID-19. He was 89. He was buried with full military honors at Restland Memorial Park Cemetery in Dallas on June 8.

Johnson was a Methodist. He sat on the board of directors of the Institute in Basic Life Principles.

== Awards and decorations ==
Johnson's decorations and awards included:

USAF Command pilot badge
USAF Parachutist badge
Silver Star with bronze oak leaf cluster		Legion of Merit with two bronze oak leaf clusters
Distinguished Flying Cross	Bronze Star Medal with Combat "V"	Purple Heart with bronze oak leaf cluster
Meritorious Service Medal	Air Medal with three bronze oak leaf clusters	Air Force Commendation Medal with bronze oak leaf cluster
Air Force Presidential Unit Citation	Air Force Outstanding Unit Award with Combat "V" and three oak leaf clusters	Air Force Outstanding Unit Award (second ribbon required for accoutrement spacing)
Prisoner of War Medal	Combat Readiness Medal with two bronze oak leaf clusters	National Defense Service Medal with service star
Korean Service Medal with two bronze campaign stars	Vietnam Service Medal with three silver and one bronze campaign stars	Air Force Longevity Service Award with silver oak leaf cluster
Small Arms Expert Marksmanship Ribbon	Republic of Korea Presidential Unit Citation	Republic of Vietnam Gallantry Cross
United Nations Korea Medal	Republic of Vietnam Campaign Medal	Korean War Service Medal

=== Silver Star citations ===
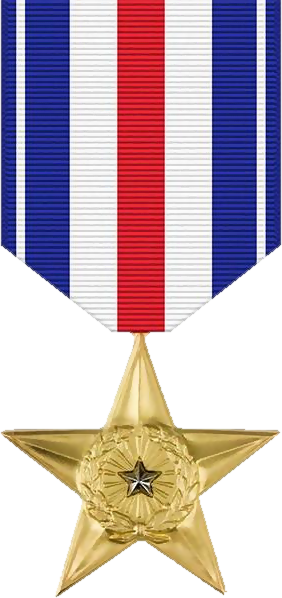

Silver Star for Actions of 16 April 1966

The President of the United States of America, authorized by Act of Congress, July 8, 1918 (amended by act of July 25, 1963), takes pleasure in presenting the Silver Star to Major Samuel Robert Johnson, United States Air Force, for gallantry in connection with military operations against an opposing armed force while serving with the 8th Tactical Fighter Wing, Ubon Royal Thai Air Base, Thailand, Pacific Air Force, in action in Southeast Asia on 16 April 1966. On that date, Major Johnson led a flight of two F-4C Fighter-Bombers on a twilight armed recce mission against a heavily defended target deep within hostile territory. Locating the target despite restricted visibility due to haze and terrain, Major Johnson encountered a curtain of flak as he rolled in for his first strike. Immediately altering his attack, although at a dangerously low altitude, he turned into the very teeth of fire from the menacing guns and continued to press the attack until his aircraft sustained mortal damage, forcing him to eject. This courageous act, attempted in the face of devastating ground fire at minimum altitude and great personal risk, epitomized the finest qualities of a true combat pilot. By his gallantry and devotion to duty, Major Johnson has reflected great credit upon himself and the United States Air Force.

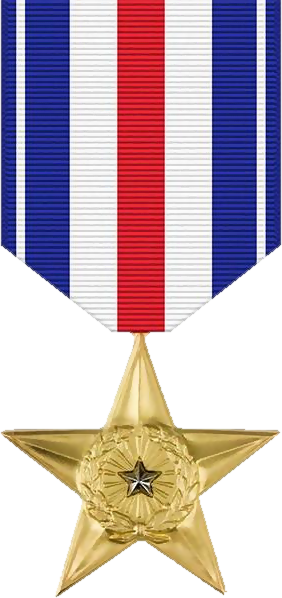

Silver Star for Actions of January 1969

The President of the United States of America, authorized by Act of Congress, July 8, 1918 (amended by act of July 25, 1963), takes pleasure in presenting a Bronze Oak Leaf Cluster in lieu of a Second Award of the Silver Star to Colonel Samuel Robert Johnson, United States Air Force, for gallantry and intrepidity in action in connection with military operations against an opposing armed force during January 1969, while a Prisoner of War in North Vietnam. Ignoring international agreements on treatment of prisoners of war, the enemy resorted to mental and physical cruelties to obtain information, confessions, and propaganda materials. Colonel Johnson resisted their demands by calling upon his deepest inner strengths in a manner which reflected his devotion to duty and great credit upon himself and the United States Air Force.

=== Other awards and honors ===
- 1990: Johnson was inducted into the Woodrow Wilson High School Hall of Fame.
- October 2009: the Congressional Medal of Honor Society awarded Johnson the National Patriot Award, the Society's highest civilian award given to Americans who exemplify patriotism and strive to better the nation.
- 2011: Freedom of Flight award
- 2014: Portion of U.S Highway 75 between the President George Bush Turnpike and U.S. Highway 380 is renamed as Sam Johnson Highway in his honor.
- March 2016: Congressional Patriots Award
- April 2016: Patriot Award
- 2015: Johnson was inducted into the International Air & Space Hall of Fame at the San Diego Air & Space Museum.
- 2020: Sam Johnson Elementary School (Prosper ISD – Celina, TX) was named in his honor
- 2025: Congresssman Sam Johnson Memorial VA Clinic - Plano, TX was named in his honor.

== Bibliography ==
- 1992, Captive Warriors: A Vietnam P.O.W.'s Story; ISBN 0-89096-496-3

U.S. House of Representatives
Preceded by Steve Bartlett	Member of the U.S. House of Representatives from Texas's 3rd congressional district 1991–2019	Succeeded by Van Taylor
Preceded by Paul Ryan	Chair of the House Ways and Means Committee; Acting; 2015	Succeeded by Kevin Brady
Preceded by Paul Ryan	Chair of the Joint Taxation Committee; Acting; 2015	Succeeded by Kevin Brady
Party political offices
Preceded by Dan Burton	Chair of the Republican Study Committee; 1995–1999; Served alongside: Dan Burton, John Doolittle, Ernest Istook	Succeeded by David McIntosh
Preceded by David McIntosh	Chair of the Republican Study Committee; 2000–2001	Succeeded by John Shadegg
Honorary titles
Preceded by Louise Slaughter	Oldest member of the U.S. House of Representatives; 2018–2019	Succeeded by Don Young
