= Frank Eikenburg =

American politician

Member of the Texas House of Representatives from the 60th district
- In office January 11, 1983 – January 8, 1985
- Preceded by: Dick Burnett
- Succeeded by: Sam Johnson

Member of the Texas House of Representatives from the 24th district
- In office January 13, 1981 – January 11, 1983
- Preceded by: Bob Hendricks
- Succeeded by: James Hury

Personal details
- Born: July 7, 1944 Wellington, Texas
- Died: June 4, 2009 (aged 64) Dallas, Texas
- Party: Republican

Frank Eikenburg (July 7, 1944 – June 4, 2009) was an American politician who served in the Texas House of Representatives from 1981 to 1985.

He died of liver cancer on June 4, 2009, in Dallas, Texas at age 64.
