= 1991 Texas's 3rd congressional district special election =

Texas's 3rd congressional district special election
- May 4, 1991 (first round); May 18, 1991 (runoff)

Texas's 3rd congressional district
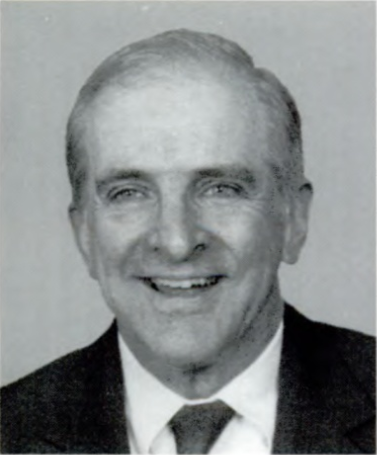

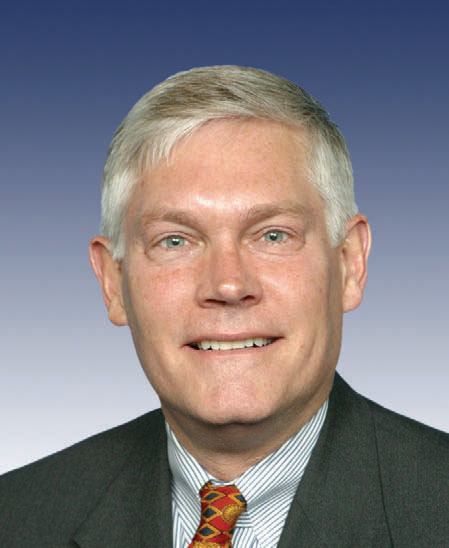
Candidate	Sam Johnson	Tom Pauken	Bill Hammond
Party	Republican	Republican	Republican
First round	10,855; 19.86%	15,018; 27.48%	6,756; 12.36%
Runoff	24,004; 52.58%	21,647; 47.42%	Eliminated
Candidate	Paul Zane Pilzer	Dan Branch	Pete Sessions
Party	Republican	Republican	Republican
First round	5,909; 10.81%	5,484; 10.03%	5,156; 9.43%
Runoff	Eliminated	Eliminated	Eliminated
U.S. Representative before election
Steve Bartlett
Republican
Elected U.S. Representative
Sam Johnson
Republican

The 1991 United States House of Representatives special election in Texas's 3rd congressional district was held on May 18, 1991, to select the successor to Steve Bartlett (R) who was elected Mayor of Dallas. The primary was held on May 4, 1991, featuring mostly Republicans.

1991 Texas 3rd Special Primary
Party	Candidate	Votes	%
Republican	Tom Pauken	15,018	27.5%
Republican	Sam Johnson	10,855	19.9%
Republican	Bill Hammond	6,756	12.4%
Republican	Paul Zane Pilzer	5,909	10.8%
Republican	Dan Branch	5,484	10.0%
Republican	Pete Sessions	5,156	9.4%
Democratic	Wayne Putnam	2,324	4.2%
Republican	Farrell Ray	1,139	2.1%
Democratic	Robert Lyle	806	1.5%
Independent	Mel Richardson	802	1.5%
Independent	Rufus Higginbotham	238	0.4%
Republican	David Corley	168	0.3%
Total votes		54,655	100%

== Runoff ==
1991 Texas 3rd Special Run-off
Party	Candidate	Votes	%
Republican	Sam Johnson	24,004	52.6%
Republican	Tom Pauken	21,647	47.4%
Total votes		45,651	100%
Republican hold			
