= March of Dimes silver dollar =

U.S. commemorative coin

- United States
- Value: $1
- Years of minting: 2015

Obverse
- Designer: Paul C. Balan

Reverse
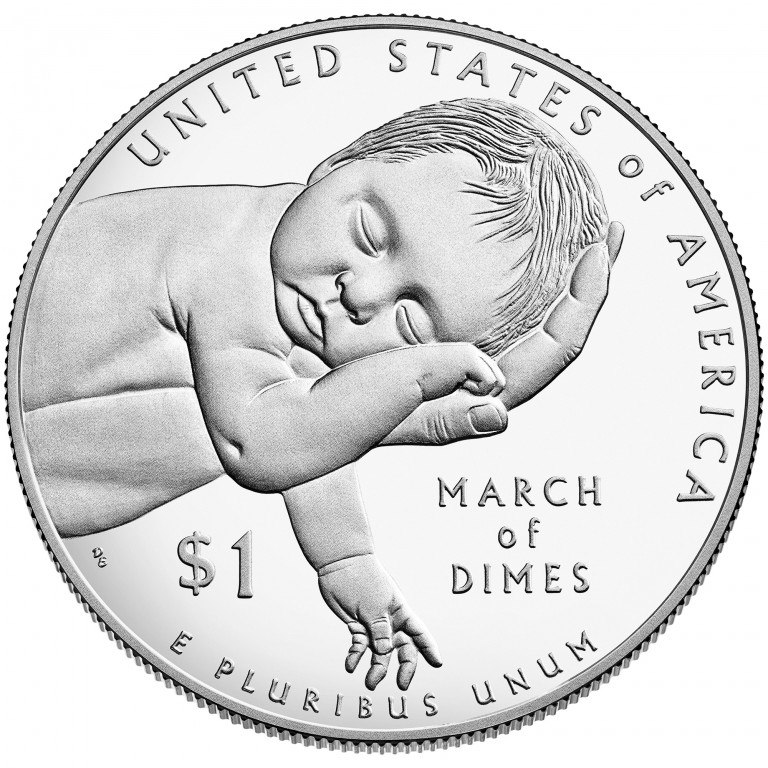
- Designer: Don Everhart

The March of Dimes silver dollar is a commemorative coin issued by the United States Mint in 2015. The coin commemorates the 75th anniversary of March of Dimes, a nonprofit organization that works to improve the health of mothers and babies.

== Design ==
Designs were recommended by the Commission of Fine Arts and Citizens Coinage Advisory Committee. The obverse features profile portraits of President Franklin D. Roosevelt and Jonas Salk, as well as inscriptions of "LIBERTY" "IN GOD WE TRUST", and "2015". It was designed by U.S. Mint Artistic Infusion Program artist Paul C. Balan. The reverse was designed by U.S. Mint artist Don Everhart and depicts a baby held in a hand.

== See also ==
- Cultural depictions of Franklin D. Roosevelt
