= Infantry Soldier silver dollar =

$1
- United States
- Years of minting: 2012

Obverse

Reverse

The Infantry Soldier silver dollar is a commemorative coin issued by the United States Mint in 2012.
