= World War I Centennial silver dollar =

- Mass: 26.730 g
- Diameter: 38.10 mm mm (1.500 inches in)
- Composition: 90% silver 10% copper
- Mintage: 350,000

Obverse

Reverse

The World War I Centennial silver dollar is a commemorative coin issued by the United States Mint in 2018.
