= Lions Clubs International Centennial silver dollar =

2017 American commemorative coin

$1
- United States
- Years of minting: 2017

Obverse

Reverse

The Lions Clubs International Centennial silver dollar is a commemorative coin issued by the United States Mint in 2017.
