= Boy Scouts of America Centennial silver dollar =

Dollar
- United States
- Value: 1 United States dollar
- Mass: 26.73 g
- Diameter: 38.1 mm (1.5 in)
- Thickness: 2.77 mm (0.109 in)
- Edge: Reeded
- Composition: 90% Ag; 10% Cu
- Years of minting: 2010
- Catalog number: KM# 480

Obverse
- Design: Depicts a Cub Scout in the foreground with a Boy Scout and a female Venturer in the background saluting. Inscriptions: CONTINUING THE JOURNEY, 1910, 2010, IN GOD WE TRUST and LIBERTY.
- Designer: Donna Weaver

Reverse
- Design: Features the Boy Scouts of America's universal emblem. Inscriptions: BOY SCOUTS OF AMERICA, BE PREPARED, E PLURIBUS UNUM and ONE DOLLAR.
- Designer: Jim Licaretz

On May 16, 2008, in a vote of 403-8, the United States House of Representatives passed H.R. 5872, the Boy Scouts of America Centennial Commemorative Coin Act. The legislation included the following information:

The Congress finds as follows:

1. The Boy Scouts of America will celebrate its centennial on February 8, 2010.
2. The Boy Scouts of America is the largest youth organization in the United States, with 3,000,000 youth members and 1,000,000 adult leaders in the traditional programs of Cub Scouts, Boy Scouts, and Venturing.
3. Since 1910, more than 111,000,000 youth have participated in Scouting's traditional programs.
4. The Boy Scouts of America was granted a Federal charter in 1916 by an Act of the 64th Congress, which was signed into law by President Woodrow Wilson.
5. In the 110th Congress, 248 members of the House of Representative and the Senate have participated in Boy Scouts of America as Scouts or adult leaders.
6. The mission of the Boy Scouts of America is 'to prepare young people to make ethical and moral choices over their lifetimes by instilling in them the values of the Scout Oath and Law'.
7. Every day across our Nation, Scouts and their leaders pledge to live up the promise in the Scout Oath–'On my honor I will do my best, To do my duty to God and my country and to obey the Scout Law; To help other people at all times; To keep myself physically strong, mentally awake, and morally straight'–and the Scout Law, according to which a Scout is 'Trustworthy, Loyal, Helpful, Friendly, Courteous, Kind, Obedient, Cheerful, Thrifty, Brave, Clean, and Reverent'.
8. In the past 4 years alone, Scouting youth and their leaders have volunteered more than 6,500,000 hours of service to their communities through more than 75,000 service projects, benefiting food banks, local schools, and civic organizations.

The bill was signed into law on October 8, 2008 by President George W. Bush (Public Law 100-363).
