= Robert Quincy Lee =

American businessman and politician

Robert Q. Lee
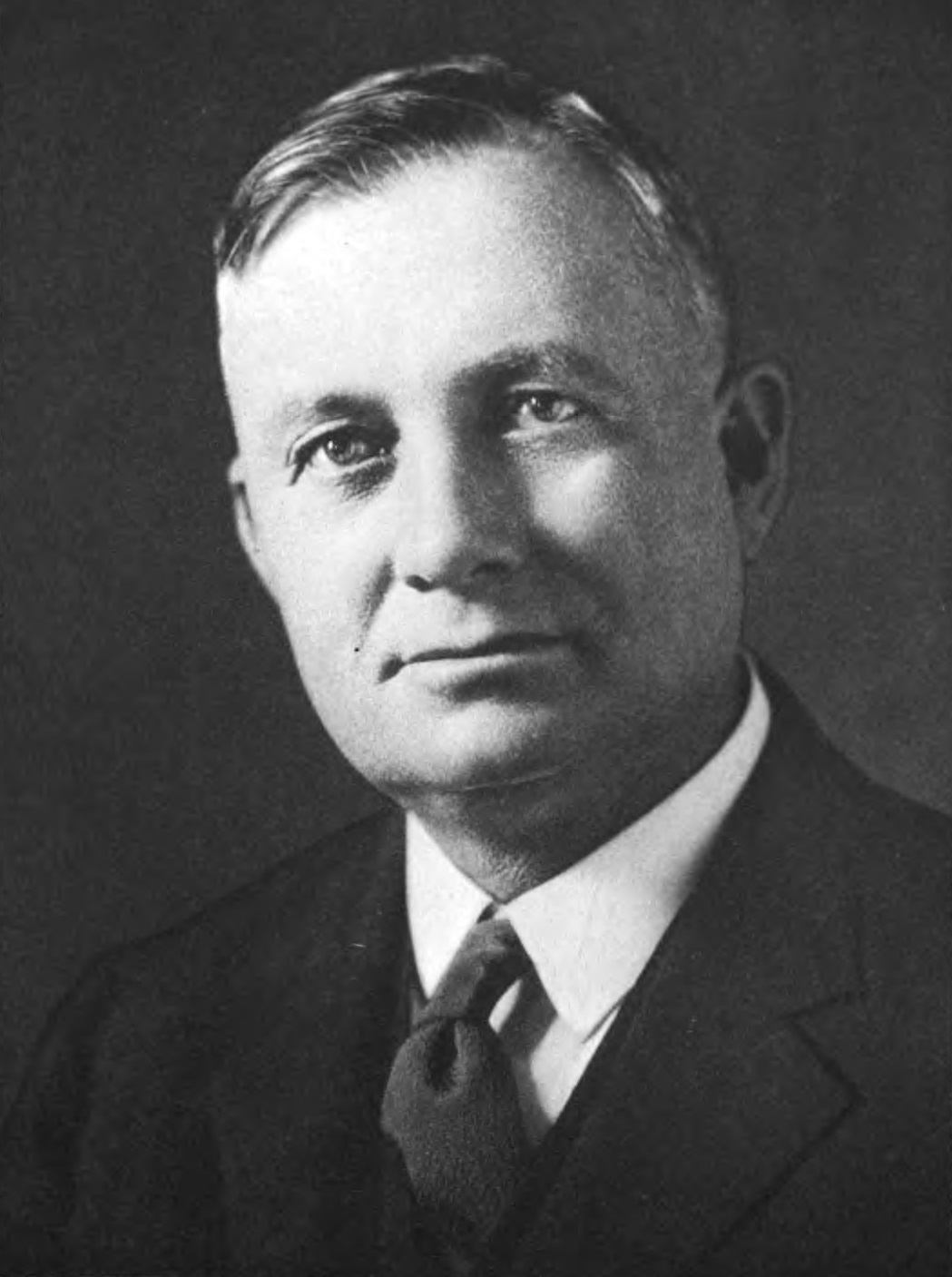

Member of the U.S. House of Representatives from Texas's 17th district
- In office March 4, 1929 – April 18, 1930
- Preceded by: Thomas L. Blanton
- Succeeded by: Thomas L. Blanton

Personal details
- Born: Robert Quincy Lee; January 12, 1869 Coldwater, Mississippi, U.S.
- Died: April 18, 1930 (aged 61) Washington, D.C.
- Resting place: Oakwood Cemetery in Cisco
- Party: Democratic

Robert Quincy Lee (January 12, 1869 – April 18, 1930) was a businessman and politician from Texas. He is most notable for serving as a U.S. representative from Texas's 17th congressional district, an office he held from March 1929 until his death 13 months later.

== Biography ==
Lee was born near Coldwater, Mississippi, and raised in Mississippi and Texas. He attended the public schools of Mississippi and Fort Worth, Texas, and graduated from Fort Worth High School.

In 1891, Lee moved to Caddo, Texas, where he owned a general store and raised cattle. While living in Caddo, Lee also served as the town's postmaster. In 1913, he moved to Cisco, Texas, where he operated ranches and farms and was president of the Cisco Banking Company. In 1919, he was the founder and builder in 1919 of the Cisco & Northeastern Railroad, and he served as its president from 1919 to 1927. From 1926 to 1927, Lee served as president of the West Texas Chamber of Commerce. He was also active in local government, including service as a member of Cisco's school board.

=== Congress ===
Lee was elected as a Democrat in 1928 to the Seventy-first Congress. He served from March 4, 1929, until his death. During his House term, Lee was a member of the Committee on Pensions.

=== Death ===
Lee died of a stroke in Washington, D.C., on April 18, 1930, at the age of 61. He was interred at Oakwood Cemetery in Cisco.

== Family ==
In 1895, Lee's married Ada Magdeline Cook (1875–1902). After her death, he married Clara Edna (Lee) Lee (1883–1933).

Lee was survived by daughters Julia (1900-1976) (Mrs. Leonard G. Simon) and Ada (1902-1993) (Mrs. Harold M. Oehler), and sons Robert Stein (1898-1971), Edward Arch (1906-1977), and Reginald Quincy (1911-1951).

== See also ==
- List of members of the United States Congress who died in office (1900–1949)

== Sources ==
=== Books ===
- United States Congress (1930). Robert Q. Lee, Late a Representative. Washington, DC: US Government Printing Office.

U.S. House of Representatives
Preceded by Thomas L. Blanton	Member of the U.S. House of Representatives from Texas's 17th congressional district March 4, 1929 - April 18, 1930	Succeeded by Thomas L. Blanton
