= William Robert Smith =

American judge (1863–1924)

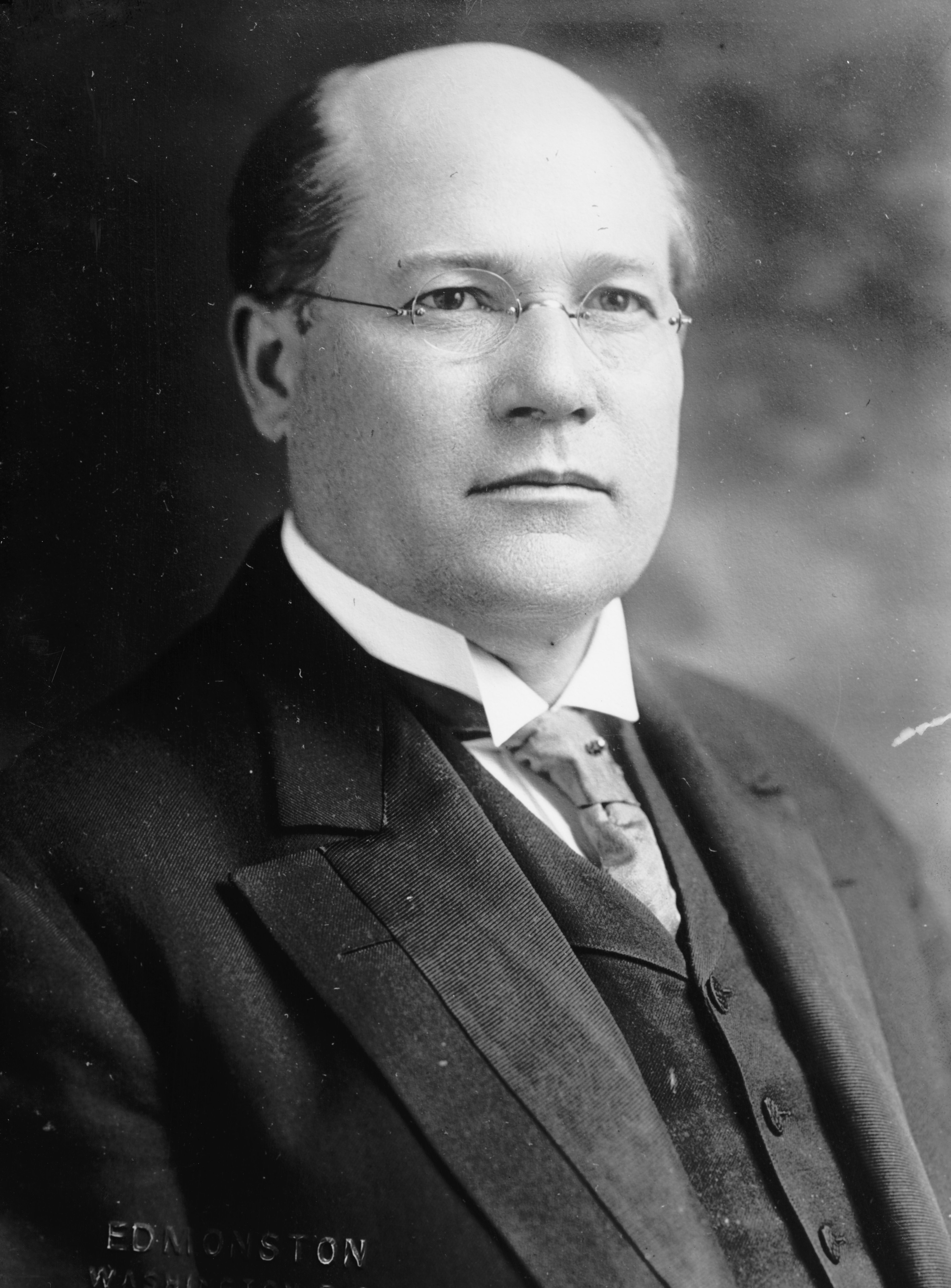

Judge of the United States District Court for the Western District of Texas
- In office April 12, 1917 – August 16, 1924
- Appointed by: Woodrow Wilson
- Preceded by: Seat established by 39 Stat. 938
- Succeeded by: Charles Albert Boynton

Member of the U.S. House of Representatives from Texas's 16th district
- In office March 4, 1903 – March 3, 1917
- Preceded by: District established
- Succeeded by: Thomas L. Blanton

Personal details
- Born: William Robert Smith; August 18, 1863 Smith County, Texas
- Died: August 16, 1924 (aged 60) El Paso, Texas
- Resting place: Evergreen Cemetery; El Paso, Texas
- Party: Democratic
- Education: Sam Houston Normal Institute read law

William Robert Smith (August 18, 1863 – August 16, 1924) was an American lawyer, jurist, and politician who served seven terms as a United States representative from Texas from 1903 to 1917. He also served as a United States district judge of the United States District Court for the Western District of Texas from 1917 to 1924.

== Education and career ==
Born on August 18, 1863, near Tyler in Smith County, Texas, Smith attended the country schools, then graduated from Sam Houston Normal Institute (now Sam Houston State University) in 1883 and read law in 1885. He was admitted to the bar and entered private practice in Tyler from 1885 to 1888, then moved in February 1888 to Colorado City, Mitchell County, Texas and continued private practice from 1888 to 1897. He was a Judge of the Texas District Court for the Thirty-Second Judicial District from 1897 to 1903.

== Congressional service ==
Smith was elected as a Democrat to the United States House of Representatives of the 58th United States Congress and to the six succeeding Congresses, serving from March 4, 1903, to March 3, 1917. He was Chairman of the Committee on Irrigation of Arid Lands in the 62nd through 64th United States Congresses. He was an unsuccessful candidate for renomination in 1916. He moved to El Paso, Texas in October 1916 and returned to the private practice of law.

== Federal judicial service ==
Smith was nominated by President Woodrow Wilson on April 11, 1917, to the United States District Court for the Western District of Texas, to a new seat authorized by 39 Stat. 938. He was confirmed by the United States Senate on April 12, 1917, and received his commission the same day. His service terminated on August 16, 1924, due to his death in El Paso, Texas. He was interred in Evergreen Cemetery in El Paso.

== Sources ==
- "William Robert Smith". Biographical Directory of the United States Congress.

U.S. House of Representatives
Preceded by District established	Member of the U.S. House of Representatives from Texas's 16th congressional district 1903–1917	Succeeded by Thomas L. Blanton
Legal offices
Preceded by Seat established by 39 Stat. 938	Judge of the United States District Court for the Western District of Texas; 1917–1924	Succeeded by Charles Albert Boynton
