= Protecting States' Rights to Promote American Energy Security Act =

2013 United States government bill

- Long title: To recognize States’ authority to regulate oil and gas operations and promote American energy security, development, and job creation.
- Announced in: the 113th United States Congress
- Sponsored by: Rep. Bill Flores (R, TX-17)
- Number of co-sponsors: 4

Codification
- Acts affected: Mineral Leasing Act of 1920
- U.S.C. sections affected: 30 U.S.C. § 181 et seq.
- Agencies affected: United States Department of the Interior

Legislative history
- Introduced in the House as H.R. 2728 by Rep. Bill Flores (R, TX-17) on July 18, 2013; Committee consideration by United States House Committee on Natural Resources, United States House Natural Resources Subcommittee on Energy and Mineral Resources; Passed the House on November 20, 2013 (Roll Call Vote 604: 235-187)

The Protecting States' Rights to Promote American Energy Security Act (H.R. 2728) is a bill that would require the federal government to defer to individual states about regulations governing hydraulic fracturing. If a state has laws or regulations regarding hydraulic fracturing, those regulations would be the rules that applied in that state, not any regulations created by the federal government. The bill passed the House during the 113th United States Congress.

== Background ==
The Department of the Interior is reportedly in the process of creating regulations governing fracking on Indian and federal land. The rules would require companies to disclose what chemicals they used and would "create standards around well integrity and management of so-called flowback water."

== Provisions of the bill ==
This summary is based largely on the summary provided by the Congressional Research Service, a public domain source.

The Protecting States' Rights to Promote American Energy Security Act would amend the Mineral Leasing Act of 1920 to prohibit the United States Department of the Interior from enforcing any federal regulation, guidance, or permit requirement regarding hydraulic fracturing (including any component of that process), relating to oil, gas, or geothermal production activities on or under any land in any state that has regulations, guidance, or permit requirements for that activity.

The bill would require the Department to recognize and defer to state regulations, permitting, and guidance, for all activities related to hydraulic fracturing relating to oil, gas, or geothermal production activities on federal land regardless of whether those rules are duplicative, more or less restrictive, have different requirements, or do not meet federal guidelines.

The bill defines "hydraulic fracturing" as the process by which fracturing fluids (including a fracturing fluid system) are pumped into an underground geologic formation to generate fractures or cracks, thereby increasing rock permeability near the wellbore and improving production of natural gas or oil.

== Congressional Budget Office report ==
This summary is based largely on the summary provided by the Congressional Budget Office, as ordered reported by the House Committee on Natural Resources on July 31, 2013. This is a public domain source.

H.R. 2728 would prevent the Department of the Interior (DOI) from enforcing regulations related to hydraulic fracturing in any state where those activities are governed by state regulations. Hydraulic fracturing involves pumping liquids into the ground to generate cracks within geologic formations to increase access to liquids and gases trapped within those formations.

Because there are currently no federal regulations directly related to hydraulic fracturing, the Congressional Budget Office (CBO) estimated that implementing H.R. 2728 would have no significant impact on the federal budget. The Department of the Interior has proposed regulations concerning hydraulic fracturing on federal and Indian lands. If those, or similar regulations, were to go into force in the future, H.R. 2728 could limit the implementation of those regulations, possibly reducing federal costs. Enacting the legislation would not affect direct spending or revenues; therefore, pay-as-you-go procedures do not apply.

H.R. 2728 contains no intergovernmental or private-sector mandates as defined in the Unfunded Mandates Reform Act.

== Procedural history ==
The Protecting States' Rights to Promote American Energy Security Act was introduced into the United States House of Representatives on July 18, 2013 by Rep. Bill Flores (R, TX-17). It was referred to the United States House Committee on Natural Resources and the United States House Natural Resources Subcommittee on Energy and Mineral Resources. The Natural Resources Committee voted 23-15 for the bill to be reported (amended) on July 31, 2013. On November 12, 2013, it was released alongside House Report 113-261. On November 15, 2013, House Majority Leader Eric Cantor announced that the bill would be considered on November 20, 2013. On November 20, 2013, the House voted in Roll Call Vote 604 to pass the bill 235-187.

== Debate and discussion ==
Republicans argued that proposed federal regulations related to fracking would add too much red tape. Republican Representative Rob Bishop (Utah) supported the bill because it would help states, especially in the western part of the country, to develop their own energy resources. Western states have a much higher percentage of federal land.

Rep. Jared Polis (D-CO) opposed the bill because it would exempt the states that had weak or minimal state regulations about fracking from more restrictive federal regulations.

President Obama opposed the bill and threatened to veto it. He criticized the bill for requiring the Bureau of Land Management to "defer to existing State regulations on hydraulic fracturing on Federal lands, regardless of the quality or comprehensiveness of the State regulations — thereby preventing consistent environmental protections."

== See also ==
- List of bills in the 113th United States Congress
