= Texas's 17th congressional district =

U.S. House district for Texas

Coordinates: 31°09′13″N 96°39′57″W

- Interactive map of district boundaries
- Representative: Pete Sessions; R–Waco
- Distribution: 75.28% urban; 24.72% rural
- Population (2025): 798,929
- Median household income: $69,950
- Ethnicity: 53.0% White; 25.3% Hispanic; 15.0% Black; 3.4% Two or more races; 2.5% Asian; 0.8% other
- Cook PVI: R+14

Texas's 17th congressional district of the United States House of Representatives includes a strip of Central Texas and Deep East Texas stretching from Nacogdoches to Waco and Round Rock, including former President George W. Bush's McLennan County ranch. The district is currently represented by Republican Pete Sessions.

From 2005 to 2013, it was an oblong district stretching from south of Tarrant County to Grimes County in the southeast. The 2012 redistricting made its area more square, removing the northern and southeastern portions, adding areas southwest into the northern Austin suburbs and east into Freestone and Leon counties. The district included two major universities, Texas A&M University in College Station and Baylor University in Waco.

Before 2005, the district stretched from the Abilene area to the outer western fringes of the Dallas-Fort Worth Metroplex.

== History ==
After the 2003 Texas redistricting, engineered by former House Majority Leader Tom DeLay, TX-17 was (along with MS-4) the most heavily Republican district in the nation to be represented by a Democrat, according to the Cook Partisan Voting Index, which rated it R+20. The district was drawn to make it Republican-dominated and unseat its longtime incumbent, conservative Democrat Chet Edwards. While several of his colleagues were defeated by Republicans in 2004, Edwards held on to the seat in the 2004, 2006 and 2008 elections.

But in the 2010 Congressional elections, the district elected Republican Bill Flores over Edwards by a margin of 61.8% to 36.6%. Flores was the first Republican to be elected to represent the district since its creation in 1919. Flores retired after five terms and former Texas 32nd district Congressman Pete Sessions, a Waco native, was elected in 2020.

After passage of civil rights legislation and other changes, through the late 20th and early 21st centuries, white conservatives began to shift into the Republican Party in Texas. They first supported presidential candidates, and gradually more Republicans for local, state and national office, resulting in the 2010 switch in party representation.

== Current composition ==
For the 118th and successive Congresses (based on redistricting following the 2020 census), the district contains all or portions of the following counties and communities:

Angelina County (7)

All 7 communities

Falls County (5)

All 5 communities

Freestone County (1)

Teague

Houston County (5)

All 5 communities

Leon County (8)

All 8 communities

Limestone County (6)

All 6 communities

McLennan County (23)

All 23 communities

Milam County (9)

All 9 communities

Nacogdoches County (6)

All 6 communities

Robertson County (4)

All 4 communities

Travis County (2)

Pflugerville (part; also 10th, 35th, and 37th; shared with Williamson County), Round Rock (part; also 31st; shared with Travis County)

Trinity County (3)

All 3 communities

Walker County (2)

Huntsville (part; also 8th), Riverside

Williamson County (5)

Coupland, Hutto (part; also 31st), Pflugerville (part; also 10th, 35th, and 37th; shared with Travis County), Round Rock (part; also 31st; shared with Travis County), Thrall (part; also 31st)

== Future composition ==
Beginning with the 2026 election, the 17th district will consist of the following counties:

- Bell (part)
- Bosque
- Falls
- Freestone
- Hill
- Johnson (part)
- Limestone
- McLennan
- Milam
- Robertson
- Williamson (part)

== List of members representing the district ==
Member (Residence)	Party	Years	Cong ress	Electoral history
District established March 4, 1919
Thomas L. Blanton (Abilene)	Democratic	March 4, 1919 – March 3, 1929	66th 67th 68th 69th 70th	Redistricted from the 16th district and re-elected in 1918. Re-elected in 1920. Re-elected in 1922. Re-elected in 1924. Re-elected in 1926. Retired to run for U.S. Senate.
Robert Q. Lee (Cisco)	Democratic	March 4, 1929 – April 18, 1930	71st	Elected in 1928. Died.
Vacant		April 18, 1930 – May 20, 1930	71st	
Thomas L. Blanton (Abilene)	Democratic	May 20, 1930 – January 3, 1937	71st 72nd 73rd 74th	Elected to finish Lee's term. Re-elected in 1932. Re-elected in 1934. Lost renomination.
Clyde L. Garrett (Eastland)	Democratic	January 3, 1937 – January 3, 1941	75th 76th	Elected in 1936. Re-elected in 1938. Lost renomination.
Sam M. Russell (Stephenville)	Democratic	January 3, 1941 – January 3, 1947	77th 78th 79th	Elected in 1940. Re-elected in 1942. Re-elected in 1944. Retired.
Omar Burleson (Anson)	Democratic	January 3, 1947 – December 31, 1978	80th 81st 82nd 83rd 84th 85th 86th 87th 88th 89th 90th 91st 92nd 93rd 94th 95th	Elected in 1946. Re-elected in 1948. Re-elected in 1950. Re-elected in 1952. Re-elected in 1954. Re-elected in 1956. Re-elected in 1958. Re-elected in 1960. Re-elected in 1962. Re-elected in 1964. Re-elected in 1966. Re-elected in 1968. Re-elected in 1970. Re-elected in 1972. Re-elected in 1974. Re-elected in 1976. Retired then resigned.
Vacant		December 31, 1978 – January 3, 1979	95th	
Charles Stenholm (Abilene)	Democratic	January 3, 1979 – January 3, 2005	96th 97th 98th 99th 100th 101st 102nd 103rd 104th 105th 106th 107th 108th	Elected in 1978. Re-elected in 1980. Re-elected in 1982. Re-elected in 1984. Re-elected in 1986. Re-elected in 1988. Re-elected in 1990. Re-elected in 1992. Re-elected in 1994. Re-elected in 1996. Re-elected in 1998. Re-elected in 2000. Re-elected in 2002. Redistricted to the 19th district and lost re-election.
Chet Edwards (Waco)	Democratic	January 3, 2005 – January 3, 2011	109th 110th 111th	Redistricted from the 11th district and re-elected in 2004. Re-elected in 2006. Re-elected in 2008. Lost re-election.
Bill Flores (Bryan)	Republican	January 3, 2011 – January 3, 2021	112th 113th 114th 115th 116th	Elected in 2010. Re-elected in 2012. Re-elected in 2014. Re-elected in 2016. Re-elected in 2018. Retired.
Pete Sessions (Waco)	Republican	January 3, 2021 – present	117th 118th 119th	Elected in 2020. Re-elected in 2022. Re-elected in 2024. Re-elected in 2026.

== Recent election results from statewide races ==
=== 2023–2027 boundaries ===
Year	Office	Results
2008	President	McCain 61% - 38%
2012	President	Romney 65% - 35%
2014	Senate	Cornyn 72% - 28%
2014	Governor	Abbott 69% - 31%
2016	President	Trump 62% - 34%
2018	Senate	Cruz 61% - 39%
2018	Governor	Abbott 64% - 34%
2018	Lt. Governor	Patrick 59% - 38%
2018	Attorney General	Paxton 60% - 38%
2018	Comptroller of Public Accounts	Hegar 62% - 35%
2020	President	Trump 61% - 38%
2020	Senate	Cornyn 61% - 36%
2022	Governor	Abbott 65% - 34%
2022	Lt. Governor	Patrick 64% - 34%
2022	Attorney General	Paxton 63% - 34%
2022	Comptroller of Public Accounts	Hegar 66% - 32%
2024	President	Trump 64% - 35%
2024	Senate	Cruz 62% - 36%

=== 2027–2033 boundaries ===
Year	Office	Results
2008	President	McCain 60% - 39%
2012	President	Romney 64% - 36%
2014	Senate	Cornyn 70% - 30%
2014	Governor	Abbott 67% - 33%
2016	President	Trump 58% - 36%
2018	Senate	Cruz 57% - 43%
2018	Governor	Abbott 61% - 37%
2018	Lt. Governor	Patrick 56% - 41%
2018	Attorney General	Paxton 56% - 42%
2018	Comptroller of Public Accounts	Hegar 59% - 37%
2020	President	Trump 57% - 41%
2020	Senate	Cornyn 58% - 39%
2022	Governor	Abbott 60% - 39%
2022	Lt. Governor	Patrick 59% - 39%
2022	Attorney General	Paxton 58% - 39%
2022	Comptroller of Public Accounts	Hegar 62% - 36%
2024	President	Trump 60% - 38%
2024	Senate	Cruz 58% - 40%
2026	Senate	Talarico 49% - 48%
2026	Governor	Abbott 51% - 47%

== Election results ==
US House election, 2024: Texas District 17
Party	Candidate	Votes	%	±%
Republican	Pete Sessions (incumbent)	193,101	66.35	
Democratic	Mark Lorenzen	97,941	33.65	
Total votes		291,042	100.00	
Republican hold				

US House election, 2022: Texas District 17
Party	Candidate	Votes	%	±%
Republican	Pete Sessions (incumbent)	144,408	66.48	+10.5
Democratic	Mary Jo Woods	72,801	33.52	−7.4
Total votes		217,209	100.0	
Republican hold		Swing	+10.5	

US House election, 2020: Texas District 17
Party	Candidate	Votes	%	±%
Republican	Pete Sessions	171,390	55.9	−0.9
Democratic	Rick Kennedy	125,565	40.92	−0.4
Libertarian	Ted Brown	9,918	3.2	+1.3
Majority		45,825	14.9	
Turnout		306,873		
Republican hold		Swing	-0.9	

US House election, 2018: Texas District 17
Party	Candidate	Votes	%	±%
Republican	Bill Flores (incumbent)	134,841	56.8	−4.01
Democratic	Rick Kennedy	98,070	41.3	+6.06
Libertarian	Clark Patterson	4,440	1.9	−2.05
Majority		36,771	15.5	
Turnout		237,351		
Republican hold		Swing	-4.01	

US House election, 2016: Texas District 17
Party	Candidate	Votes	%	±%
Republican	Bill Flores (incumbent)	149,417	60.81	−3.77
Democratic	William Matta	86,603	35.24	+2.84
Libertarian	Clark Patterson	9,708	3.95	+0.93
Majority		53,106	21.6	
Turnout		245,728		
Republican hold		Swing	-3.77	

US House election, 2014: Texas District 17
Party	Candidate	Votes	%	±%
Republican	Bill Flores (incumbent)	85,807	64.58	−15.35
Democratic	Nick Haynes	43,049	32.4	
Libertarian	Shawn Michael Hamilton	4,009	3.02	−17.05
Majority		38,749	29.16	
Turnout		132,865		
Republican hold		Swing	-15.35	

US House election, 2012: Texas District 17
Party	Candidate	Votes	%	±%
Republican	Bill Flores (incumbent)	143,284	79.93	+34.8
Libertarian	Ben Easton	35,978	20.07	119
Majority		107,306		
Turnout		179,262		4.23
Republican hold		Swing	+18.14	

US House election, 2010: Texas District 17
Party	Candidate	Votes	%	±%
Republican	Bill Flores	106,275	61.79	+16.28
Democratic	Chet Edwards (incumbent)	62,926	36.59	−16.39
Libertarian	Richard Kelly	2,787	1.62	+0.11
Majority		43,349	25.2	+17.73
Turnout		171,988		
Republican gain from Democratic		Swing	+16.34	

US House election, 2008: Texas District 17
Party	Candidate	Votes	%	±%
Democratic	Chet Edwards (incumbent)	134,592	52.98	−5.14
Republican	Rob Curnock	115,581	45.51	+5.21
Libertarian	Gardner C. Osbourne	3,849	1.51	−0.07
Majority		19,011	7.47	−10.35
Turnout		254,022		
Democratic hold		Swing	-5.18	

US House election, 2006: Texas District 17
Party	Candidate	Votes	%	±%
Democratic	Chet Edwards (incumbent)	92,478	58.12	+6.92
Republican	Van Taylor	64,142	40.30	−7.11
Libertarian	Guillermo Acosta	2,504	1.58	+0.19
Majority		28,336	17.82	+14.03
Turnout		159,124		
Democratic hold		Swing	+7.02	

US House election, 2004: Texas District 17
Party	Candidate	Votes	%	±%
Democratic	Chet Edwards	125,309	51.20	−0.17
Republican	Arlene Wohlgemuth	116,049	47.41	+0.03
Libertarian	Clyde Garland	3,390	1.39	+0.14
Majority		9,260	3.79	−0.19
Turnout		244,748		
Democratic hold		Swing	-0.1	

US House election, 2002: Texas District 17
Party	Candidate	Votes	%	±%
Democratic	Charlie Stenholm (incumbent)	84,136	51.37	
Republican	Rob Beckham	77,622	47.38	
Libertarian	Fred Jones	2,046	1.25	
Majority		6,514	3.98	
Turnout		163,804		
Democratic hold		Swing		

== Historical district boundaries ==
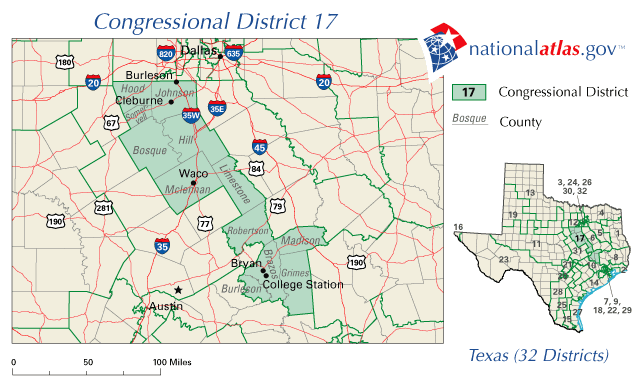
2007–2013

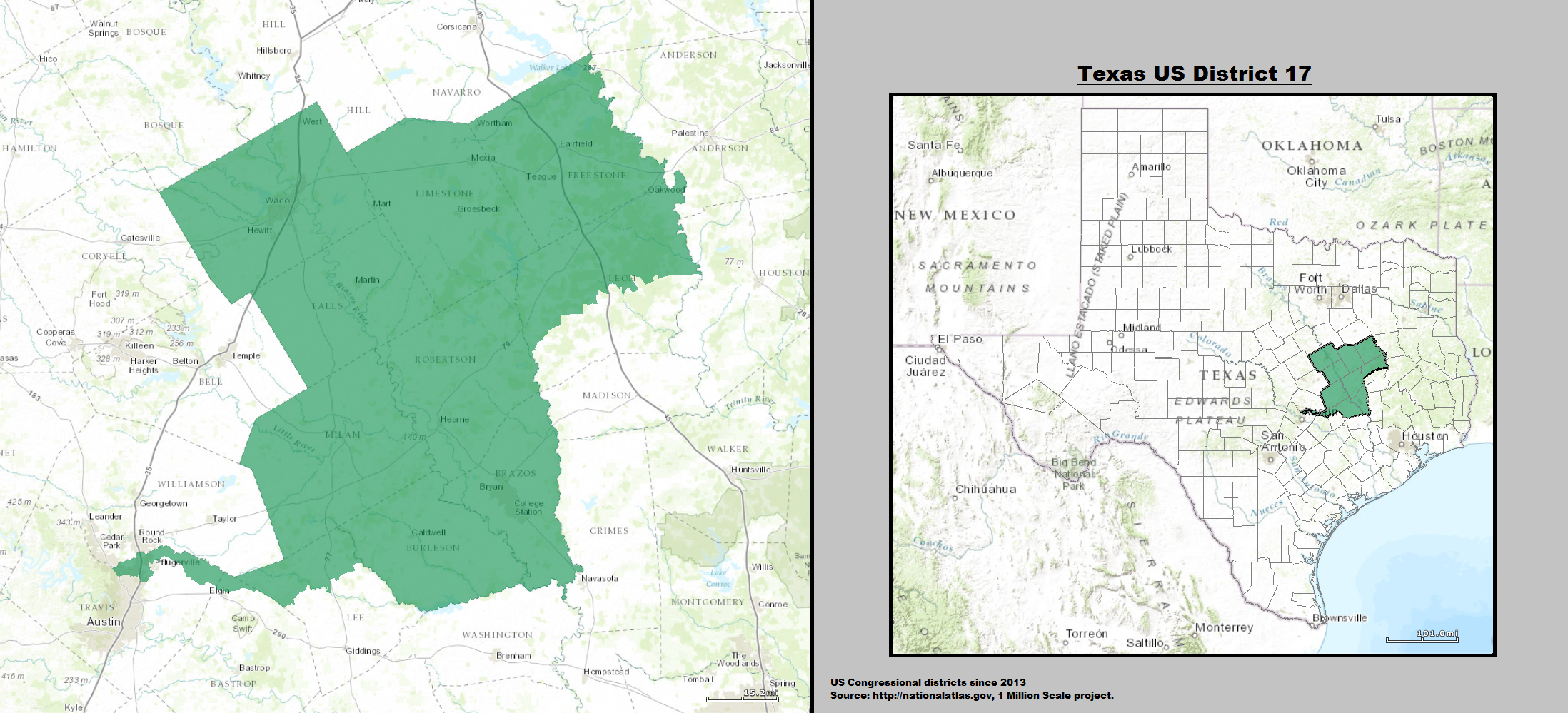
2013–2023

== See also ==
- List of United States congressional districts
