= Sam M. Russell =

American politician

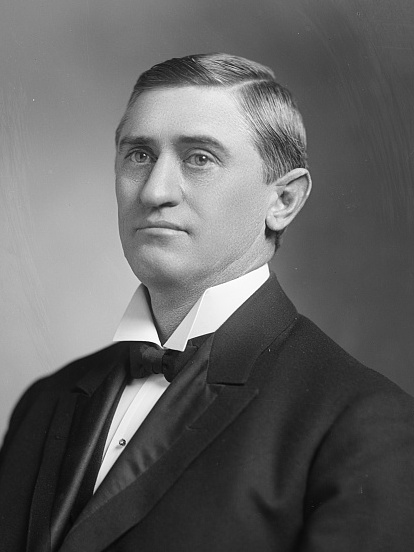
- Sam M. Russell photographed by C. M. Bell Studio

Member of the U.S. House of Representatives from Texas's 17th district
- In office January 3, 1941 – January 3, 1947
- Preceded by: Clyde L. Garrett
- Succeeded by: Omar Burleson

Personal details
- Born: Samuel Morris Russell; August 9, 1889 near Stephenville, Texas, U.S.
- Died: October 19, 1971 (aged 82) Stephenville, Texas, U.S.
- Party: Democratic
- Education: John Tarleton Agricultural College
- Occupation: Lawyer, schoolteacher

Military service
- Allegiance: United States
- Branch/service: United States Army
- Years of service: 1918–1919

Sam Morris Russell (August 9, 1889 – October 19, 1971) was a U.S. representative from Texas.

Born on a farm near Stephenville, Texas, Russell attended the rural schools and the John Tarleton Agricultural College, Stephenville, Texas. He taught school in Erath County, Texas from 1913 to 1918. He also engaged in agricultural pursuits. During the First World War, he served as a private in the Forty-sixth Machine Gun Company, United States Army, in 1918 and 1919. He studied law, was admitted to the bar in 1919, and commenced practice in Stephenville, Texas. He served as county attorney of Erath County, Texas from 1919 to 1924. He subsequently served as district attorney of the Twenty-ninth Judicial District (1924–1928). Later, Russell served as judge of the twenty-ninth judicial district (1928–1940), and continued practicing law in Erath County.

Russell was elected as a Democrat to the Seventy-seventh and to the two succeeding Congresses (January 3, 1941 – January 3, 1947). He was not a candidate for renomination in 1946 to the Eightieth Congress. He resumed the practice of law, and served as Democratic county chairman from 1953 to 1955. He resided in Stephenville, Texas, until his death there October 19, 1971. He was interred in East Memorial Cemetery.

== Sources ==
- United States Congress. "Sam M. Russell (id: R000538)". Biographical Directory of the United States Congress.

U.S. House of Representatives
Preceded by Clyde L. Garrett	Member of the U.S. House of Representatives from Texas's 17th congressional district 1941-1947	Succeeded by Omar Burleson
