= Thomas L. Blanton =

American politician

Thomas Blanton
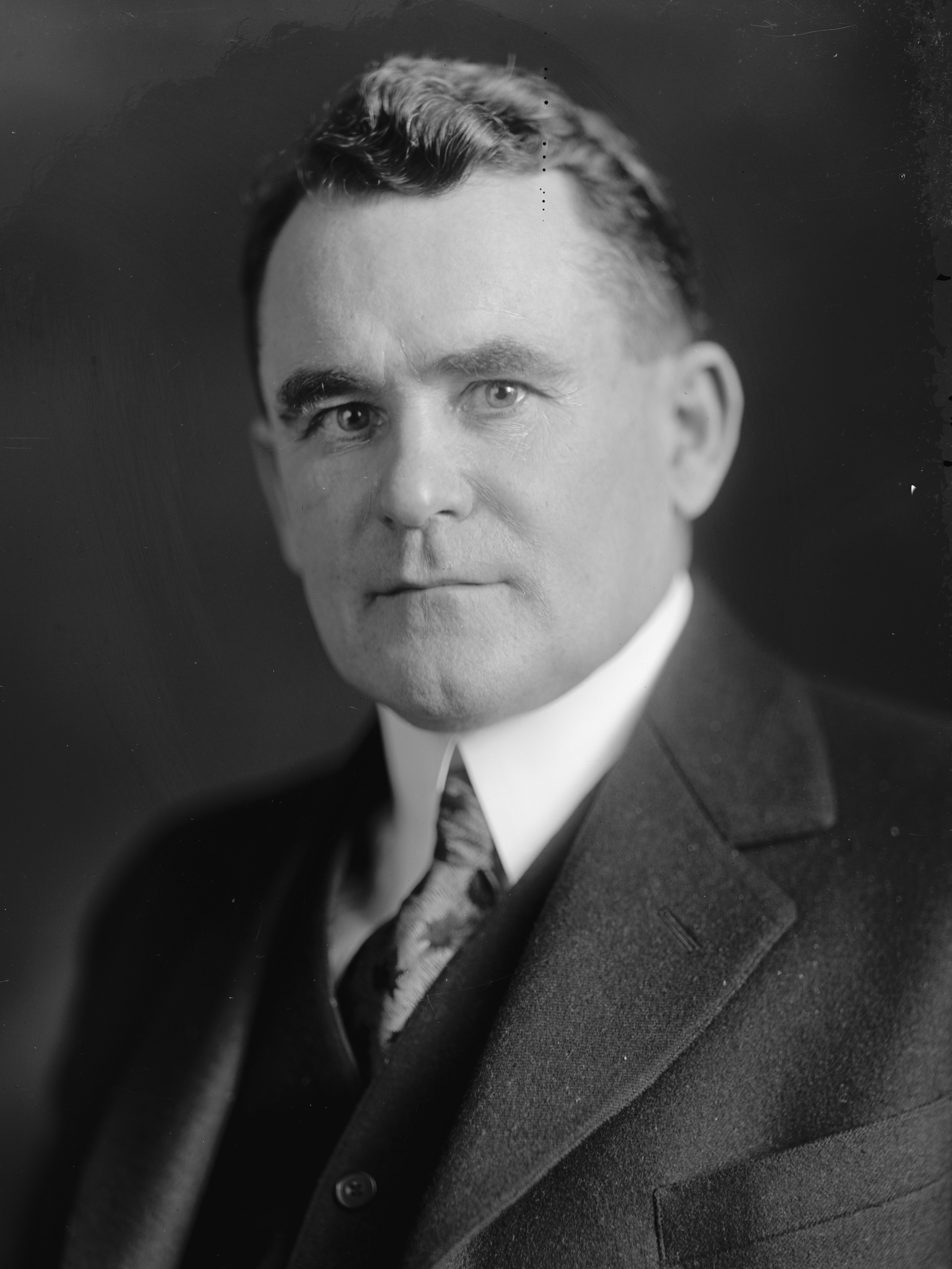
- Blanton in 1905

Member of the U.S. House of Representatives from Texas
- In office May 20, 1930 – January 3, 1937
- Preceded by: Robert Lee
- Succeeded by: Clyde L. Garrett
- Constituency: 17th district
- In office March 4, 1917 – March 3, 1929
- Preceded by: William Smith
- Succeeded by: Robert Lee
- Constituency: 16th district (1917–1919); 17th district (1919–1929)

Personal details
- Born: Thomas Lindsay Blanton; October 25, 1872 Houston, Texas, U.S.
- Died: August 11, 1957 (aged 84) Albany, Texas, U.S.
- Party: Democratic
- Education: University of Texas, Austin (LLB)

Thomas Lindsay Blanton (October 25, 1872 – August 11, 1957) was a United States representative from Texas from 1917 to 1929, then again from 1930 to 1937. He was a member of the Democratic Party.

== Biography ==
Born in Houston, Texas, Blanton was educated in the public schools. He graduated from the law department of the University of Texas at Austin in 1897, with three years in the academic department. He was admitted to the bar in 1897 and commenced practice in Cleburne. He moved to Albany, Texas, and continued the practice of law until 1908, when he was elected judge of the 42nd Judicial District of Texas. He was reelected in 1912 and served in that capacity until he was elected to Congress in 1916.

Blanton was elected as a Democrat to the Sixty-fifth and to the five succeeding Congresses (March 4, 1917 – March 3, 1929).

=== Censure ===
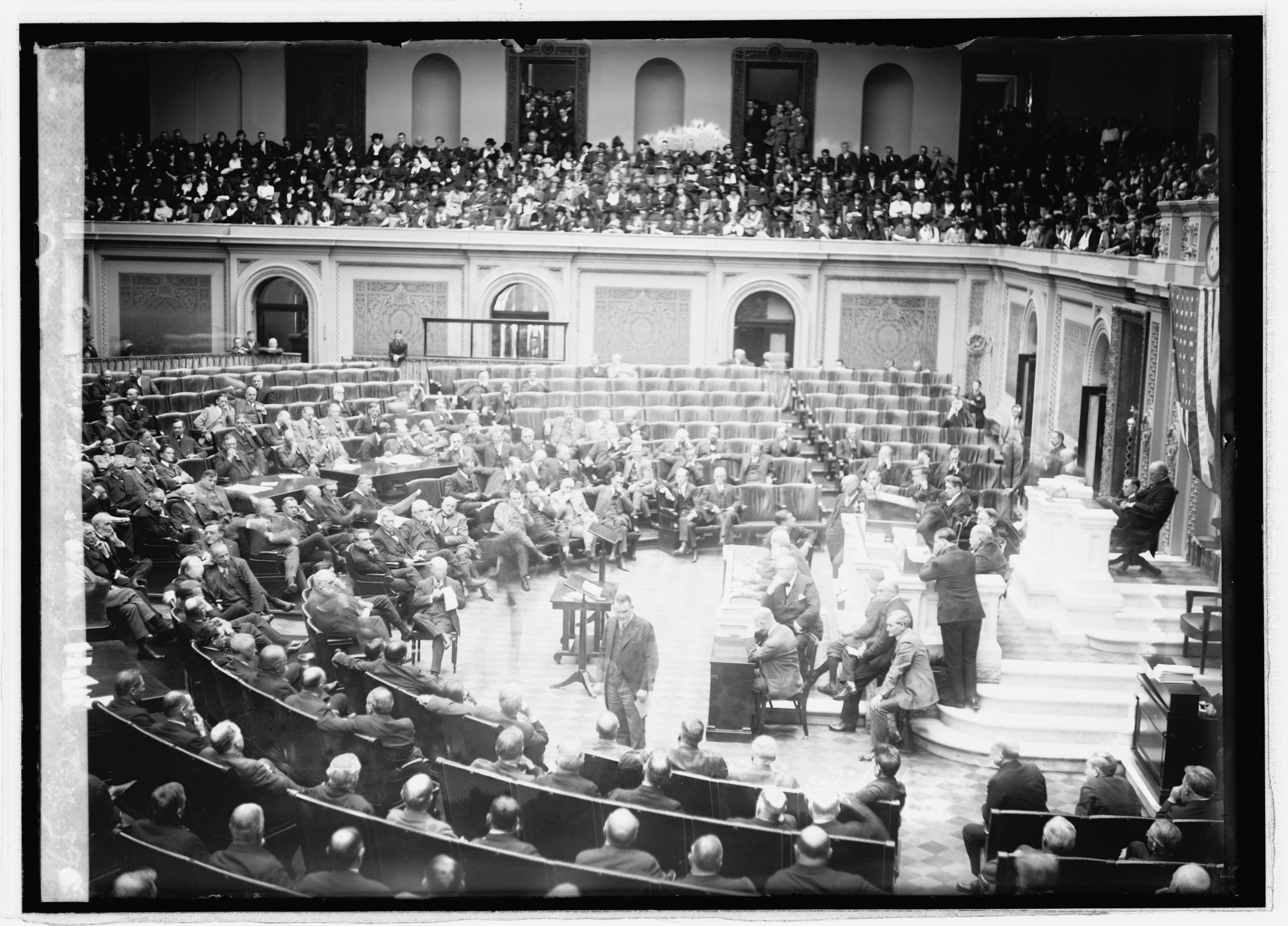
Blanton speaking to the House on October 27, 1921

While a member of the House of Representatives of the Sixty-seventh Congress, Blanton inserted into the Congressional Record a letter purporting to have been written by one Millard French, a non-union printer, to "George H. Carter, Public Printer"; the letter recited a conversation reported to have occurred between French and a printer named Levi Huber who belonged to the union. The letter was said to contain language that was "unspeakable, vile, foul, filthy, profane, blasphemous and obscene", in the words of Representative Franklin Mondell, and the House voted to expunge the letter from the Congressional Record, on a vote of 313 to 1.

The letter itself was an affidavit sent by an employee of the Public Printer on September 3, 1921, and relates to the Government Printing Office. A selection of the letter, which relates what Levi Huber, the corrector of revises, said to the employee:

G__d D___n your black heart, you ought to have it torn out of you, you u____ s_____ of a b_____. You and the Public Printer has no sense. You k_____ his a____ and he is a d_____d fool for letting you do it.

Robert D. Stevens of the University of Hawaii at Manoa wrote in a 1982 article that the offending remarks "were not all that offensive by today's standards," and only took up half a column of the Record, and furthermore contained only 32 "obscene" words, which were already censored in the form of removing most of the letters and replacing them with underscores.

A motion to expel Blanton failed by only eight votes, and he was unanimously censured by the House of Representatives on October 27, 1921, for "abuse of leave to print." Mondell, the author of the expulsion resolution, claimed on the floor of the House of Representatives that "There is not a member who will not say that it is the vilest thing he has ever seen in print", and that "Any one speaking the words contained in the Congressional Record would be subject to fine and imprisonment under the laws of the land." Representative Finis Garrett, defending Blanton, insisted Blanton had "no intention of being indecent but merely [had] a desire to show a condition existing between organized and non-organized labor in the printing office."

== Subsequent events ==
The censure motion did not appear to harm Blanton's reputation with his constituents and he was re-elected to the House in 1922, 1924, and 1926. He was not a candidate for renomination in 1928 but was an unsuccessful candidate for nomination to the United States Senate.

=== Return to Congress ===
Blanton was subsequently elected on May 20, 1930, to the Seventy-first Congress to fill the vacancy caused by the death of his House successor, Robert Q. Lee, who died little more than a year after taking office. He was re-elected to the Seventy-second, Seventy-third, and Seventy-fourth Congresses and served from May 20, 1930, to January 3, 1937. He was an unsuccessful candidate for renomination in 1936.

He engaged in the practice of law in Washington, D.C., in 1937 and 1938. He returned to Albany, Texas, in 1938, and continued practicing law. He also engaged in the raising of Hereford cattle.

He died in Albany in 1957 and is interred there at Albany Cemetery. He was a brother of Annie Webb Blanton (1870-1945), a two-term Texas state superintendent of public instruction and a former president of the Texas State Teachers Association, who lived most of her adult years in Denton.

== See also ==
- List of federal political scandals in the United States
- List of United States representatives expelled, censured, or reprimanded

== Sources ==
- United States Congress. "Thomas L. Blanton (id: B000549)". Biographical Directory of the United States Congress.

- Biography in the Handbook of Texas Online

U.S. House of Representatives
Preceded by William Smith	Member of the U.S. House of Representatives from Texas's 16th congressional district 1917–1919	Succeeded by Claude Hudspeth
New constituency	Member of the U.S. House of Representatives from Texas's 17th congressional district 1919–1929	Succeeded by Robert Lee
Preceded by Robert Lee	Member of the U.S. House of Representatives from Texas's 17th congressional district 1930–1937	Succeeded by Clyde L. Garrett
