= Claude Hudspeth =

American cowboy, rancher, lawyer, and statesman

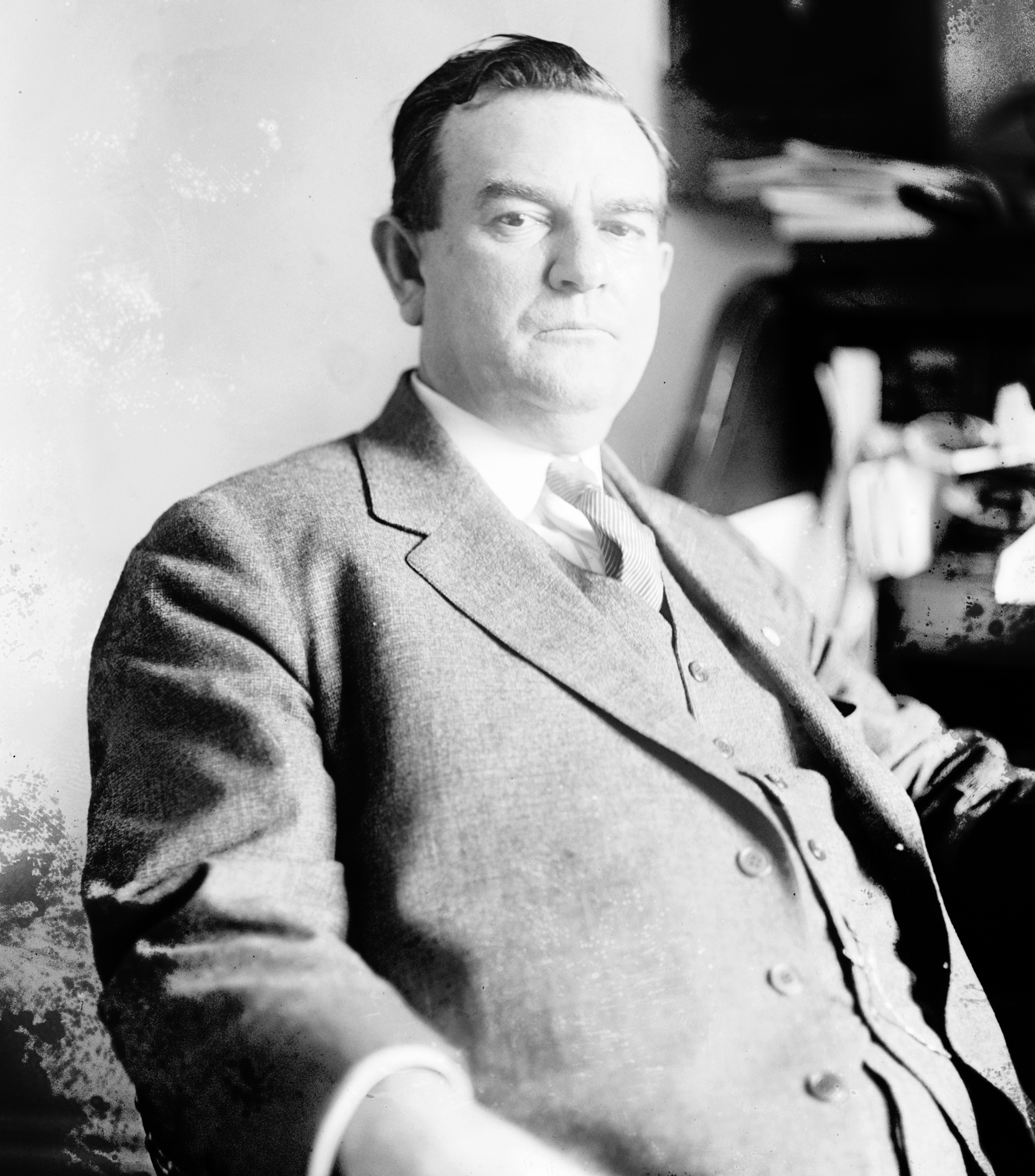

Member of the U.S. House of Representatives from Texas's 16th district
- In office March 4, 1919 – March 3, 1931
- Preceded by: Thomas L. Blanton
- Succeeded by: R. Ewing Thomason

Personal details
- Born: Claude Benton Hudspeth; May 12, 1877 Medina, Bandera County, Texas, U.S.
- Died: March 19, 1941 (aged 63) San Antonio, Texas, U.S.
- Resting place: Mission Burial Park in San Antonio
- Party: Democratic
- Spouse: Marie Cliborne (m. 1902)
- Children: 2

Claude Benton Hudspeth (May 12, 1877 – March 19, 1941) was an American politician, lawyer, and rancher from El Paso, Texas. A member of the Democratic Party, he served in the United States House of Representatives for Texas's 16th congressional district from 1919 to 1931 after serving in both chambers of the Texas Legislature.

== Early life ==
Hudspeth was born in Medina, Bandera County in 1877. His parents had recently settled there from Drew County, Arkansas. Hudspeth moved to Ozona at age 16 and became founding publisher of newspaper Ozona Kicker. He later worked as a cattle trader and rancher.

== Political career ==
Hudspeth later entered politics, first serving in the Texas House of Representatives from 1902 to 1906 and Texas State Senate from 1906 to 1918. As a Texas state senator, Hudspeth successfully persuaded Governor William P. Hobby to create a 16-member unit of the Texas Ranger Division patrolling the border with Mexico, also known as the "Hudspeth Rangers".

In 1909, Hudspeth was admitted to the State Bar of Texas. He began practicing law with El Paso firm Neaon, Hudspeth, and McGill.

Then from 1919 to 1931, he represented Texas's 16th congressional district in the United States House of Representatives. In Congress, Hudspeth strongly supported U.S. intervention in the Mexican Border War. Hudspeth declined to run for re-election in 1930 due to ill health; after retiring from Congress, he became director of an oil company.

== Personal life ==
Hudspeth married Marie Cliborne in 1902; they had two children.

Hudspeth moved to San Antonio in 1940, and died there on March 19, 1941. He is buried in the Mission Burial Park in San Antonio. Hudspeth County, Texas was named for him after he supported its creation in the state senate.

U.S. House of Representatives
Preceded by Thomas L. Blanton	Member of the U.S. House of Representatives from Texas's 16th congressional district 1919–1931	Succeeded by R. Ewing Thomason
