= Omar Burleson =

American politician

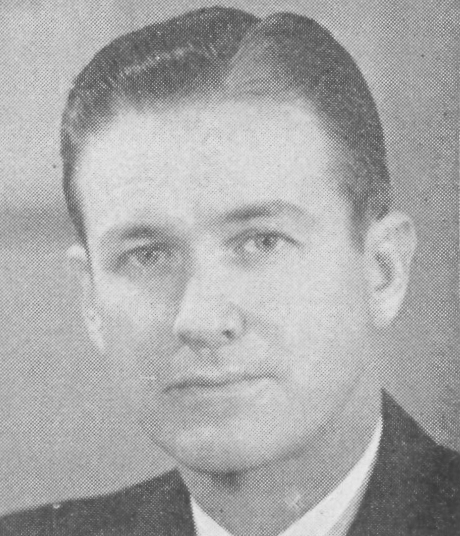
- Omar Burleson, 1953 from Congressional Pictorial Directory

Member of the U.S. House of Representatives from Texas's 17th district
- In office January 3, 1947 – December 31, 1978
- Preceded by: Sam M. Russell
- Succeeded by: Charles Stenholm

Personal details
- Born: Omar Truman Burleson; March 19, 1906 Anson, Texas, U.S.
- Died: May 14, 1991 (aged 85) Abilene, Texas, U.S.
- Party: Democratic
- Education: Abilene Christian College; Hardin-Simmons University; Cumberland University

Omar Truman Burleson (March 19, 1906 – May 14, 1991) was an attorney, judge, FBI agent and veteran of World War II when he was first elected in 1946 as a Democratic U.S. representative from Texas's 17th congressional district. He was re-elected to Congress from this rural district for more than 30 years, resigning on December 31, 1978 after having decided not to run again for office.

== Early life and education ==
Born in Anson, the seat of Jones County, north of Abilene, Texas, Burleson attended the public schools there. He received his higher education at Abilene Christian College and Hardin-Simmons University, both in Abilene.

Burleson went to Tennessee for law school, graduating in 1929 from Cumberland University in Lebanon, Tennessee. He returned to Texas, where he was admitted to the bar the same year. He set up a practice in Gorman in Eastland County. With business slowing because of the Great Depression, Burleson sought public office.

== Legal and related career ==
In 1930 Burleson was elected to his first public office, as County Attorney of Jones County, Texas, serving from 1931 to 1934. He next was elected as a judge in Jones County, serving from 1934 to 1940.

In 1940 Burleson was hired as a special agent of the Federal Bureau of Investigation, serving into 1941. He entered politics, serving as a secretary and staff member to U.S. Representative Sam Russell of Texas's 17th congressional district in 1941 and 1942. With Russell's support, Burleson was appointed as general counsel for the Housing Authority in the District of Columbia in 1942; at that time, the District did not have home rule and was controlled by Congress through its committees.

After the United States entered World War II, Burleson served in the United States Navy from December 1942 to April 1946. He was assigned to the South Pacific Theater.

== Political career ==
Following the war, in 1946 Burleson was elected to national office as a Democrat from the area where he had established his reputation: Texas's 17th congressional district to the Eightieth Congress, succeeding Sam Russell. He was reelected to the fifteen succeeding Congresses from this rural district, and served from January 3, 1947, until his resignation, December 31, 1978.

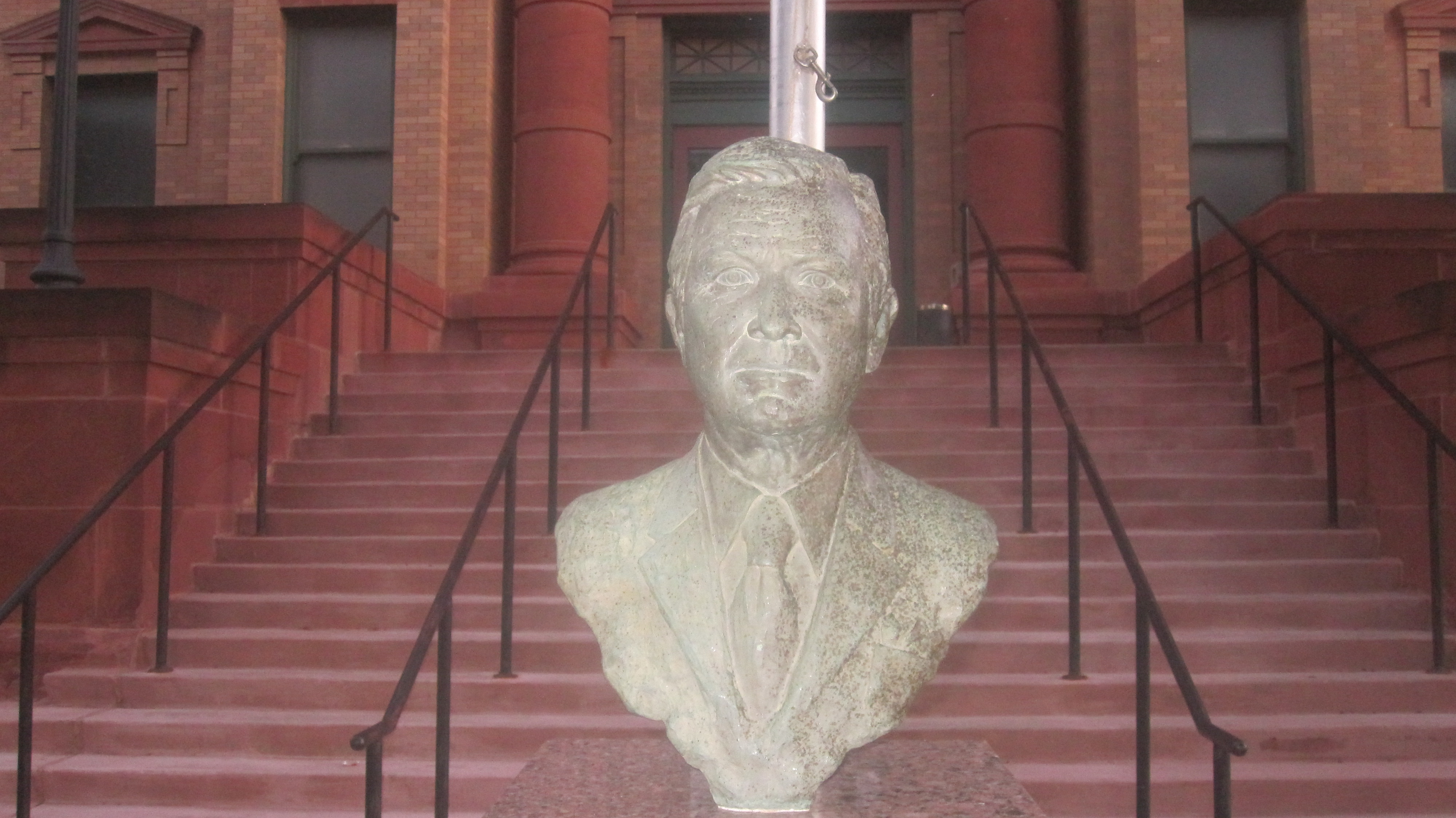
Statue of Omar Burleson at Jones County Courthouse in Anson, Texas

Because of his seniority, Burleson gained the chairmanships of the Committee on House Administration (Eighty-fourth through Ninetieth Congresses), the Joint Committee on the Library (Eighty-fourth through Ninetieth Congresses), and the Joint Committee on Printing (Eighty-fourth Congress). In the Ninetieth Congress, burdened with the management and lack of same of his colleagues, he resigned the chairs to take a seat on the Ways and Means Committee to safeguard Texas' oil depletion allowance.

Burleson was one of the majority of the Texan delegation to decline to sign the 1956 Southern Manifesto opposing the desegregation of public schools as ordered by the Supreme Court in its ruling on Brown v. Board of Education. It had determined that segregated public schools were unconstitutional. Delegations of other Southern states, particularly Virginia and some in the Deep South, did sign the manifesto and actively resisted such desegregation for years.

But Burleson voted against the Civil Rights Acts of 1957, the Civil Rights Acts of 1960, the Civil Rights Acts of 1964, and the Civil Rights Acts of 1968, which were directed at enforcing constitutional rights for African Americans and other minorities. He also opposed ratification of the 24th Amendment to the U.S. Constitution and opposed the passage of the Voting Rights Act of 1965, which gave the federal government oversight and enforcement over state practices that discriminated against minority voters. Burleson for years was the leader of a group of Southern and Border Democrats, pejoratively known as the Boll Weevils Club, that would deliver votes to the Republican minority of the House.

Burleson chose against running for reelection in 1978. He was succeeded by the election of fellow conservative Democrat Charles Stenholm of Stamford, which is also in Jones County. Stenholm owned and operated a large cotton farm there, but lived in Abilene, Texas.

After resigning from Congress, Burleson resided in Abilene until his death there on May 14, 1991. He is interred at the Mount Hope Cemetery in Anson, his hometown.

== Legacy ==
A statue of Burleson was installed in his hometown of Anson at the Jones County Courthouse. He had also served there in his early career as County Attorney and judge of the County Circuit Court.

== Sources ==
- United States Congress. "Omar Burleson (id: B001111)". Biographical Directory of the United States Congress.

U.S. House of Representatives
Preceded by Sam M. Russell	Member of the U.S. House of Representatives from Texas's 17th congressional district January 3, 1947 - December 31, 1978	Succeeded by Charles W. Stenholm
