= Clyde L. Garrett =

American politician

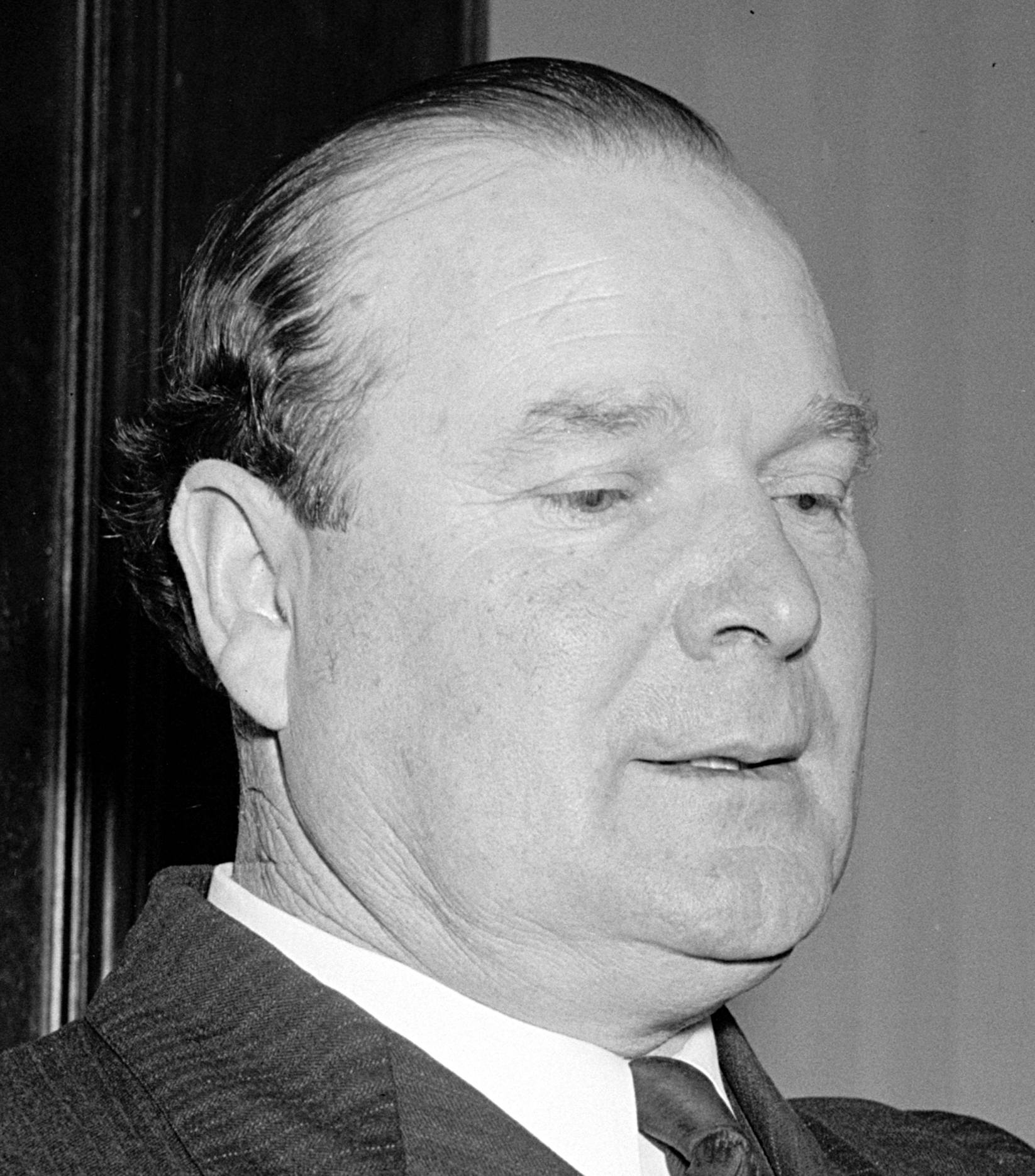
- Garrett in January 1939

Texas Representative in the US House of Representatives
- In office January 3, 1937 – January 3, 1941

Personal details
- Born: December 16, 1885 Near Gorman, Texas, USA
- Died: December 18, 1959 (aged 74) Eastland, Texas, USA
- Party: Democratic

Clyde Leonard Garrett (December 16, 1885 – December 18, 1959) was a U.S. representative from Texas. Born on a farm near Gorman, Texas, Garrett attended the public schools and Hankins' Normal College in his native city. Raised on a farm. He worked as a railroad section hand. He taught school at Sweetwater, Texas, in 1906 and 1907. Deputy in the office of the tax collector 1907-1912. County clerk of Eastland County, Texas from 1913 to 1919. He engaged in the real estate, insurance, and banking businesses 1920-1922. City manager of the city of Eastland, Texas, in 1922 and 1923. County judge 1929-1936.

Garrett was elected as a Democrat to the Seventy-fifth and Seventy-sixth Congresses (January 3, 1937 – January 3, 1941). He was an unsuccessful candidate for renomination in 1940. Administrative officer in the office of the Secretary of Commerce from January 15, 1941, to May 1, 1942, at which time he became staff specialist in the Office of War Information and served until October 15, 1943. He was an unsuccessful candidate for Democratic nomination to the Seventy-ninth Congress in 1944. Technical assistant, Veterans Administration, Washington, D.C., and Dallas, Texas from 1949 to 1950. Manager, Veterans Administration regional office, Waco, Texas from 1951 to 1956. He was an unsuccessful candidate for Eastland County judgeship in 1958. He died in Eastland, Texas, December 18, 1959. He was interred in Eastland Cemetery.

== Sources ==
- United States Congress. "Clyde L. Garrett (id: G000080)". Biographical Directory of the United States Congress.

U.S. House of Representatives
Preceded by Thomas L. Blanton	Member of the U.S. House of Representatives from Texas's 17th congressional district 1937-1941	Succeeded by Sam M. Russell
