= R. Ewing Thomason =

American judge

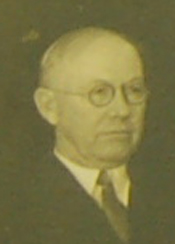

Senior Judge of the United States District Court for the Western District of Texas
- In office June 1, 1963 – November 8, 1973

Judge of the United States District Court for the Western District of Texas
- In office June 5, 1947 – June 1, 1963
- Appointed by: Harry S. Truman
- Preceded by: Charles Albert Boynton
- Succeeded by: Homer Thornberry

Member of the U.S. House of Representatives from Texas's 16th district
- In office March 4, 1931 – July 31, 1947
- Preceded by: Claude Hudspeth
- Succeeded by: Kenneth M. Regan

Personal details
- Born: Robert Ewing Thomason; May 30, 1879 Shelbyville, Tennessee, U.S.
- Died: November 8, 1973 (aged 94) El Paso, Texas, U.S.
- Party: Democratic
- Education: Southwestern University (B.S.); University of Texas School of Law (LL.B.)

Robert Ewing Thomason (May 30, 1879 – November 8, 1973) was an American politician and judge. A member of the Democratic Party, he was a member and Speaker of the Texas House of Representatives, the mayor of El Paso, a member of the United States House of Representatives for Texas's 16th congressional district, and a United States district judge of the Western District of Texas.

== Early life and education ==
Born in Shelbyville, Bedford County, Tennessee, Thomason moved to Gainesville, Texas, with his parents in 1880. He attended public schools, and received a Bachelor of Science degree from Southwestern University in Georgetown, Texas, in 1898. Thomason received a Bachelor of Laws from the University of Texas School of Law in 1900 and was admitted to the bar in 1901, commencing practice in Gainesville. Thomason was the prosecuting attorney of Cooke County, Texas, from 1902 to 1906.

== Professional career ==
Thomason continued to practice law upon his moving to El Paso, in a law firm with Thomas Calloway Lea, Jr., and later J. G. McGrady and Eugene T. Edwards. He was a member of the Texas House of Representatives from 1917 to 1921, serving as Speaker in 1920 and 1921. Thomason served as the Mayor of El Paso from 1927 to 1930, and was elected to the 72nd United States Congress as a Democrat in 1930. Thomason served from March 4, 1931 until his resignation on July 31, 1947, to take a seat on the federal bench.

== Federal judicial service ==
Thomason was nominated by President Harry S. Truman on April 24, 1947, to a seat on the United States District Court for the Western District of Texas vacated by Judge Charles Albert Boynton. He was confirmed by the United States Senate on June 3, 1947, and received his commission on June 5, 1947. He assumed senior status on June 1, 1963. He served in senior status in El Paso until his death there on November 8, 1973. He was interred in Restlawn Cemetery in El Paso.

== Honor ==
El Paso County Hospital District's University Medical Center, was named in his honor from 1963 until 2009. In 2016 the United States courthouse in El Paso was renamed in his honor.

== Fraternity ==
Robert E. Thomason was a freemason and belonged to El Paso Lodge # 130 A.F. & A.M. He also belonged to El Maida Shrine and served as Illustrious Potentate.

== Sources ==
- "Robert Ewing Thomason". Biographical Directory of the United States Congress.

Civic offices
Preceded by H. P. Jackson	Mayor of El Paso; 1927–1930	Succeeded by A. B. Poe
U.S. House of Representatives
Preceded by Claude Benton Hudspeth	Member of the U.S. House of Representatives from Texas's 16th congressional district 1931–1947	Succeeded by Kenneth M. Regan
Legal offices
Preceded by Charles Albert Boynton	Judge of the United States District Court for the Western District of Texas; 1947–1963	Succeeded by Homer Thornberry
