= 1918 Texas gubernatorial election =

- November 5, 1918
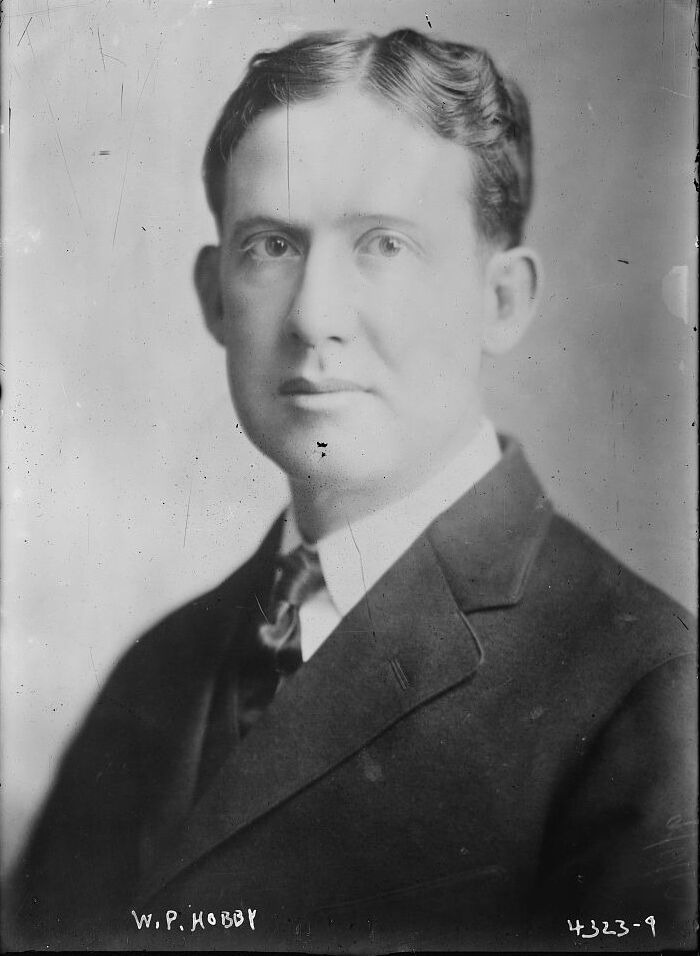

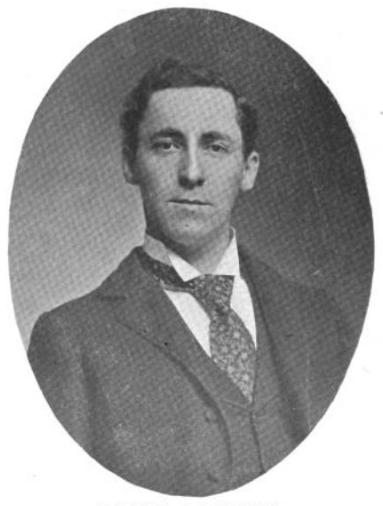
Nominee	William P. Hobby	Charles Albert Boynton
Party	Democratic	Republican
Popular vote	148,982	26,713
Percentage	84.00%	15.06%
- County results Hobby: 50–60% 60–70% 70–80% 80–90% 90–100% Boynton: 50–60% 70–80% No Data/Vote
Governor before election
William P. Hobby
Democratic
Elected Governor
William P. Hobby
Democratic

The 1918 Texas gubernatorial election was held on November 5, 1918, in order to elect the Governor of Texas. Incumbent Democratic governor William P. Hobby easily won re-election to his first full term after ascending to the governorship in 1917 following the impeachment and conviction of his predecessor, James "Pa" Ferguson. He defeated Republican nominee Charles Albert Boynton.

== Democratic primary ==
=== Background ===
In 1917, Governor James Ferguson was impeached by the state legislature on charges of misapplication of public funds. The state senate voted to convict Ferguson and remove him from office. Under Texas law, due to his conviction he was ineligible to hold any public office in the state. However, Ferguson had resigned the day prior to the conviction was finalized, and as such he contended that the prohibition was invalid. Lieutenant Governor William P. Hobby was then sworn in as governor and at the time was the youngest man to hold the office. Ferguson challenged Hobby for the Democratic party nomination in 1918, but the scandal affected his popularity and Hobby won by one of the widest margins ever in a Democratic primary. At the time, Texas was a part of the Solid South and winning the primary practically guaranteed winning the general election.

=== Candidates ===
- William P. Hobby, incumbent governor
- James "Pa" Ferguson, former governor

=== Primary results ===
Democratic primary results
Party	Candidate	Votes	%
Democratic	William P. Hobby (incumbent)	461,479	68.02
Democratic	James E. Ferguson	217,012	31.98
Total votes		678,491	100.00

== General election ==
- Charles Albert Boynton, Waco attorney and former United States Attorney for the Western District of Texas (Republican)
- William Pettus Hobby, incumbent Governor (Democratic)
- William D. Simpson (Socialist)

Hobby faced token Republican opposition in the general election from republican nominee Charles Albert Boynton, who would later be appointed as a judge for the United States District Court for the Western District of Texas by President Coolidge.

Hobby received 84.0% of the vote, a typical margin for statewide Democrats in the early 20th century.

=== Results ===
1918 Texas gubernatorial election
Party	Candidate	Votes	%
Democratic	William Pettus Hobby (incumbent)	148,982	84.00
Republican	Charles Albert Boynton	26,713	15.06
Socialist	William D. Simpson	1,660	0.94
Total votes		177,355	100.00
Democratic hold			
