= Chet Edwards =

American politician (born 1951)

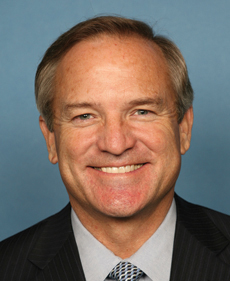
- Edwards in 2008

Member of the U.S. House of Representatives from Texas
- In office January 3, 1991 – January 3, 2011
- Preceded by: Marvin Leath
- Succeeded by: Bill Flores
- Constituency: 11th district (1991–2005); 17th district (2005–2011)

Member of the Texas Senate from the 9th district
- In office January 11, 1983 – January 2, 1991
- Preceded by: Dee Travis
- Succeeded by: David Sibley

Personal details
- Born: Thomas Chester Edwards; November 24, 1951 (age 74) Corpus Christi, Texas, U.S.
- Party: Democratic
- Spouse: Lea Edwards
- Education: Texas A&M University (BA); Harvard University (MBA)
- Website: Official website
- Edwards's voice Edwards on designating the Waco Mammoth site as a national monument. Recorded July 27, 2009

Thomas Chester Edwards (born November 24, 1951) is an American politician who was a United States representative from Texas, representing a district based in Waco, from 1991 to 2011. Previously, he served in the Texas Senate from 1983 to 1990. He is a member of the Democratic Party. Edwards was on Barack Obama's vice presidential shortlist in 2008.

== Early life and education ==
A Waco resident, Edwards was born in Corpus Christi. He graduated magna cum laude from Texas A&M University in 1974, earning a bachelor's degree in economics. One of his professors was future U.S. Representative and U.S. Senator Phil Gramm. Upon graduation, he received the Earl Rudder Award, which is given to two outstanding seniors. Edwards was the Chairman of the 18th MSC Student Conference on National Affairs Conference, where he helped to bring Vice President Walter Mondale and businessman Ross Perot to campus.

== Early career ==
After graduation, Edwards worked as an aide to Congressman Olin E. Teague for three years. This mentorship later influenced Edwards’ work in Congress on Veterans Affairs. When Teague announced his retirement in 1978, Edwards ran in the Democratic primary to succeed him. He lost by only 115 votes to his former professor, Phil Gramm, who switched to Republican affiliation in 1983.

In 1981, Edwards earned his MBA from Harvard Business School. He then went to work for the Trammell Crow Company as a commercial real estate agent. Later, Edwards purchased several rural radio stations in South Texas.

=== Texas Senate ===
Edwards was elected to the Texas Senate in 1983, and served until 1990, representing District 9. He was the youngest member at age 30. In the Texas Senate, Edwards was a member of the Senate Education Committee which oversaw class size reduction in public schools. He was also on the Health and Human Resources Committee, chaired the Senate Nominations Committee, the Texas Sunset Commission, a joint commission which reviews state agencies on a 12-year rotation, and the Texas Election Code Revision Committee. Edwards was also a member of the Committee on Business, Technology, and Education. He received the “Texas Business” award during the 68th Regular Session as one of three outstanding freshman legislators, and was named by Texas Monthly as one of the "Ten Outstanding Legislators" during his tenure.

== U.S. House of Representatives ==
=== Committee assignments ===
- Committee on Appropriations
  - Subcommittee on Energy and Water Development
  - Subcommittee on Financial Services and General Government
  - Subcommittee on Military Construction, Veterans Affairs, and Related Agencies (Chair)
- Committee on the Budget

Edwards served as a member on the House Budget Committee, the Appropriations Committee, and the Financial Services Appropriations Subcommittee and vice chair of the Energy and Water Appropriations Subcommittee. He also chaired the House Army Caucus. After becoming Chairman of the Military Construction and Veterans Affairs Appropriations Subcommittee in 2007, Edwards authored a $17.7 billion increase in funding for veterans health care and benefits, the largest increase in veterans funding in the history of the Veterans Administration. He also assisted in enacting the 21st Century GI Bill of Rights into law, covering the full cost of a college education for troops. In 2008, both the American Legion and Veterans of Foreign Wars recognized Edwards' leadership with their national awards. In 2007, he received the Marix Congressional Achievement Award from the Military Officers Association of America (MOAA) in recognition of his work. In 2006, Edwards was honored with the Award of Merit, the highest award given by the Military Coalition, which represents 36 military and veteran groups. In 2003, the Association of the U.S. Army gave Edwards its "Legislator of the Year Award." He was co-chair of the House Army Caucus for over a decade and served on the House Armed Services and Veterans Affairs Committees for six years before joining the Appropriations Committee.

== Political positions ==
Edwards is a moderate Democrat according to a nonpartisan organization GovTrack. He was also a leader in the House of Representatives.

However, he has stated his opposition to caps on medical malpractice lawsuits. He voted for the Iraq Resolution.

=== Fiscal policy ===
Edwards opposed the 2001 federal tax cuts and voted against eliminating the marriage penalty and estate tax. He voted for the American Recovery and Reinvestment Act of 2009.

In 2001, he opposed cuts of $100 million to the nuclear non-proliferation budget proposed by the Bush administration. Serving as a member on the Energy and Water Appropriations Subcommittee, Edwards oversaw homeland defense and university research programs to protect Americans from the threat of nuclear terrorism. Edwards supported the implementation of the recommendations of the 9/11 Commission and, in 2003, helped secure $84 million to install radiological detectors at the busiest foreign ports so nuclear materials could be detected overseas before reaching America. Edwards is known as a fiscal conservative. The non-partisan Concord Coalition gave him its "Deficit Hawk" Award. His pro-economic, pro-agriculture record also earned him endorsements from both the U.S. Chamber of Commerce and the Farm Bureau Friends of Agriculture Fund (AGFUND). The U.S. Chamber of Commerce gave him their "Spirit of Enterprise" Award for several years for his support of business. Edwards voted with the NRA 100% on gun rights issues for many years and received the NRA's endorsement.

=== Social policy ===
Edwards traditionally votes against same-sex marriage. He has voted in favor of Constitutional amendments to ban same-sex marriage, as well as to define marriage one-man-one-woman, and holds a 25% rating from the Human Rights Campaign. Edwards voted against ending preferential treatment by race in college admissions and received an 83% rating from the NAACP in 2006. Edwards has received an "A" by the NRA Political Victory Fund.

Edwards supported increased access to health care for children of working families under the State Children's Health Insurance Program (S-CHIP). Edwards was honored by the Baptist Joint Committee, and earned the Walter Cronkite Award from the Interfaith Alliance for his principled stand to keep government regulations out of churches and houses of worship. He also received the T.B. Maston Christian Ethics Award.

== Political campaigns ==
Edwards was elected to the U.S. House in 1990 with 54 percent of the vote in what was then the 11th District, defeating Republican Hugh Shine. He was re-elected in 1992 with 67 percent of the vote, defeating Republican James Broyles. He defeated Broyles again in 1994 with 59 percent of the vote.

During the 1990s, like much of rural Texas, the 11th District trended increasingly Republican. Edwards was able to hold onto his seat, though with shrinking margins. In 1996, he was re-elected with 57 percent of the vote against Republican Jay Mathis. He won in 1998 without any Republican opponent. In 2000 he won with 55 percent of the vote over Ramsey Farley; in 2002, he beat Farley again, this time with 52 percent of the vote. In 2000, he became President Bush's congressman; the district includes Prairie Chapel Ranch just outside Crawford, which was Bush's legal residence during his presidential term.

As part of the 2003 Texas redistricting, Edwards' district was renumbered as the 17th District and radically altered. The ethnically diverse cities of Temple and Killeen were removed, as was the Army post of Fort Hood. In their place, his district absorbed College Station, home to Texas A&M and a long-standing bastion of conservatism. It also absorbed some heavily Republican territory near Fort Worth. While Edwards' old district had been trending Republican for some time, the new district was, on paper, one of the most Republican districts in the country. Edwards defeated conservative State Representative Arlene Wohlgemuth in November 2004 by 9,260 votes, or approximately a 3.8% margin. Proving just how Republican the new 17th district was, Bush carried it with a staggering 70 percent of the vote—the most of any Democratic-held district, and Bush's 17th-best district in the entire country. Edwards was one of two Democrats to represent a significant portion of the Dallas-Fort Worth Metroplex in Congress, along with Eddie Bernice Johnson. In much of the district, Edwards was the only elected Democrat above the county level. It was generally understood that he would be succeeded by a Republican when he retired.

In 2006, Edwards ran for reelection against Republican Van Taylor, a former Marine Corps reservist and Iraq War veteran, and was re-elected with 58% of the vote to Taylor's 40%.

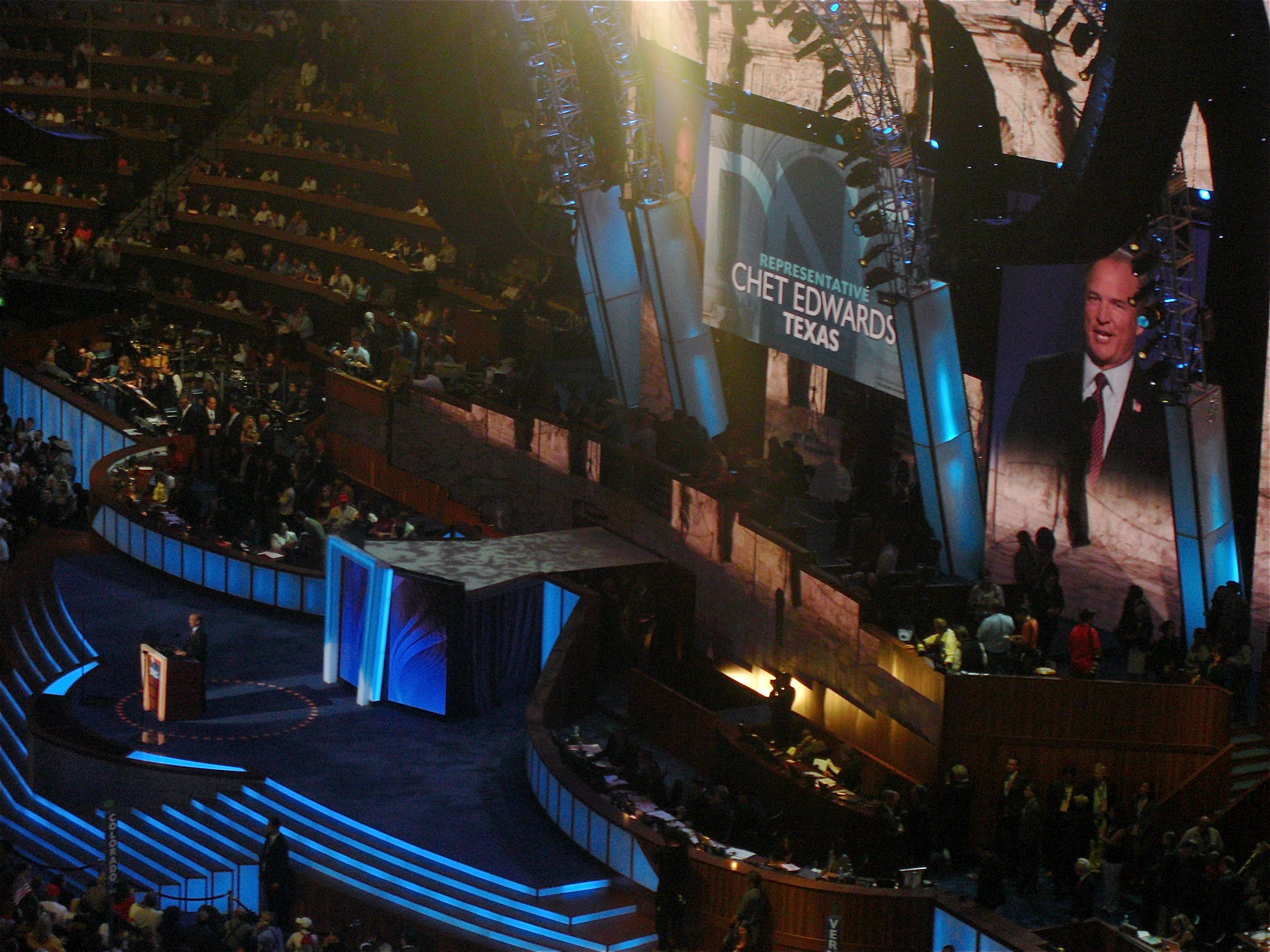
Edwards speaks during the third night of the 2008 Democratic National Convention in Denver, Colorado.

On February 18, 2008, Edwards officially endorsed Barack Obama in the Texas March 4 Democratic primary. In late June 2008, Speaker of the House Nancy Pelosi publicly suggested that Edwards would be a great choice as Obama's vice-presidential running mate. Edwards stated that he would accept such an offer from Obama. On August 22, the Associated Press reported that Edwards was on Obama's short-list as a potential running-mate.

=== 2008 ===
In November 2008, Edwards was reelected, defeating Republican Rob Curnock, a Waco video business owner, with 53 percent of the vote. John McCain carried the 17th with 67 percent of the vote.

=== 2010 ===
Edwards was challenged by Republican nominee Bill Flores, a retired Bryan oil and gas executive.

Edwards was endorsed by the Dallas Morning News and the Fort Worth Star-Telegram.

Nate Silver in the FiveThirtyEight.com New York Times blog predicted that there was a 4.7% chance that Edwards would defeat Flores. Real Clear Politics rated this race "Likely Republican".

On November 2, 2010, Edwards was heavily defeated, taking 37 percent of the vote to Flores's 62 percent. He lost his home county of McLennan. This was the largest margin of defeat for a Democratic incumbent in the 2010 cycle. Edwards's term ended on January 3, 2011.

== Personal life ==
Since leaving Congress in 2011, Edwards has established Edwards, Davis Stover & Associates, LLC with his former chief of staff, Lindsey Davis Stover, and continues to be involved with veterans issues in the Washington, D.C. area through his work on the boards of the Military Child Education Coalition and the Arlington National Cemetery Advisory Commission. He is married to Lea Ann Wood from Paducah, Kentucky. They have two sons, J.T. and Garrison. He was raised a Methodist.

U.S. House of Representatives
Preceded by Marvin Leath	Member of the U.S. House of Representatives from Texas's 11th congressional district 1991–2005	Succeeded by Mike Conaway
Preceded by Charles Stenholm	Member of the U.S. House of Representatives from Texas's 17th congressional district 2005–2011	Succeeded by Bill Flores
U.S. order of precedence (ceremonial)
Preceded by Bill McCollum as Former U.S. Representative	Order of precedence of the United States as Former U.S. Representative	Succeeded by Ruben Hinojosa as Former U.S. Representative
