= Charles Albert Boynton =

American judge and politician (1867–1954)

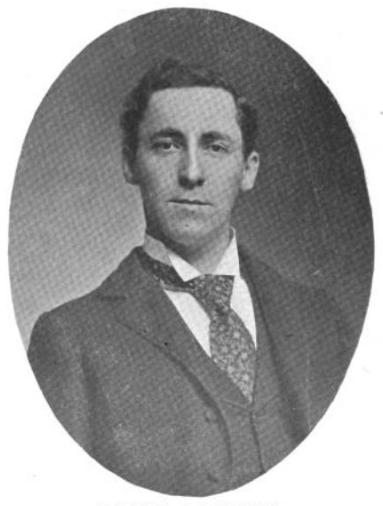

Senior Judge of the United States District Court for the Western District of Texas
- In office May 1, 1947 – October 12, 1954

Judge of the United States District Court for the Western District of Texas
- In office December 17, 1924 – May 1, 1947
- Appointed by: Calvin Coolidge
- Preceded by: William Robert Smith
- Succeeded by: R. Ewing Thomason

Personal details
- Born: Charles Albert Boynton; November 26, 1867 Quebec, Canada
- Died: October 12, 1954 (aged 86) Dallas, Texas
- Party: Republican
- Education: Western Kentucky University (B.B.S.); University of Michigan Law School (LL.B.)

Charles Albert Boynton (November 26, 1867 – October 12, 1954) was a Canadian-born American lawyer, politician, and jurist who served for 30 years from 1924 to 1954 as a United States district judge of the United States District Court for the Western District of Texas.

== Education and career ==
Born in East Hatley, Compton County, Quebec, Canada, Boynton received a Bachelor of Business Studies degree from Glasgow Normal School (now Western Kentucky University) in 1888 and a Bachelor of Laws from the University of Michigan Law School in 1891.

=== Legal career ===
He was in private practice in Waco, Texas from 1891 to 1907. He was the United States Attorney for the Western District of Texas from 1907 to 1912, and then returned to private practice in Waco until 1924.

== Federal judicial service ==
On December 16, 1924, Boynton was nominated by President Calvin Coolidge to a seat on the United States District Court for the Western District of Texas vacated by Judge William Robert Smith. Boynton was confirmed by the United States Senate on December 17, 1924, and received his commission the same day. He assumed senior status on May 1, 1947, serving in that capacity until his death.

== Death ==
He died on October 12, 1954, in Dallas, Texas.

== Sources ==
Party political offices
Preceded by Rentfro Banton Creager	Republican nominee for Governor of Texas; 1918	Succeeded by J. G. Culbertson
Legal offices
Preceded by William Robert Smith	Judge of the United States District Court for the Western District of Texas; 1924–1947	Succeeded by R. Ewing Thomason
