= Bill Flores =

American politician (born 1954)

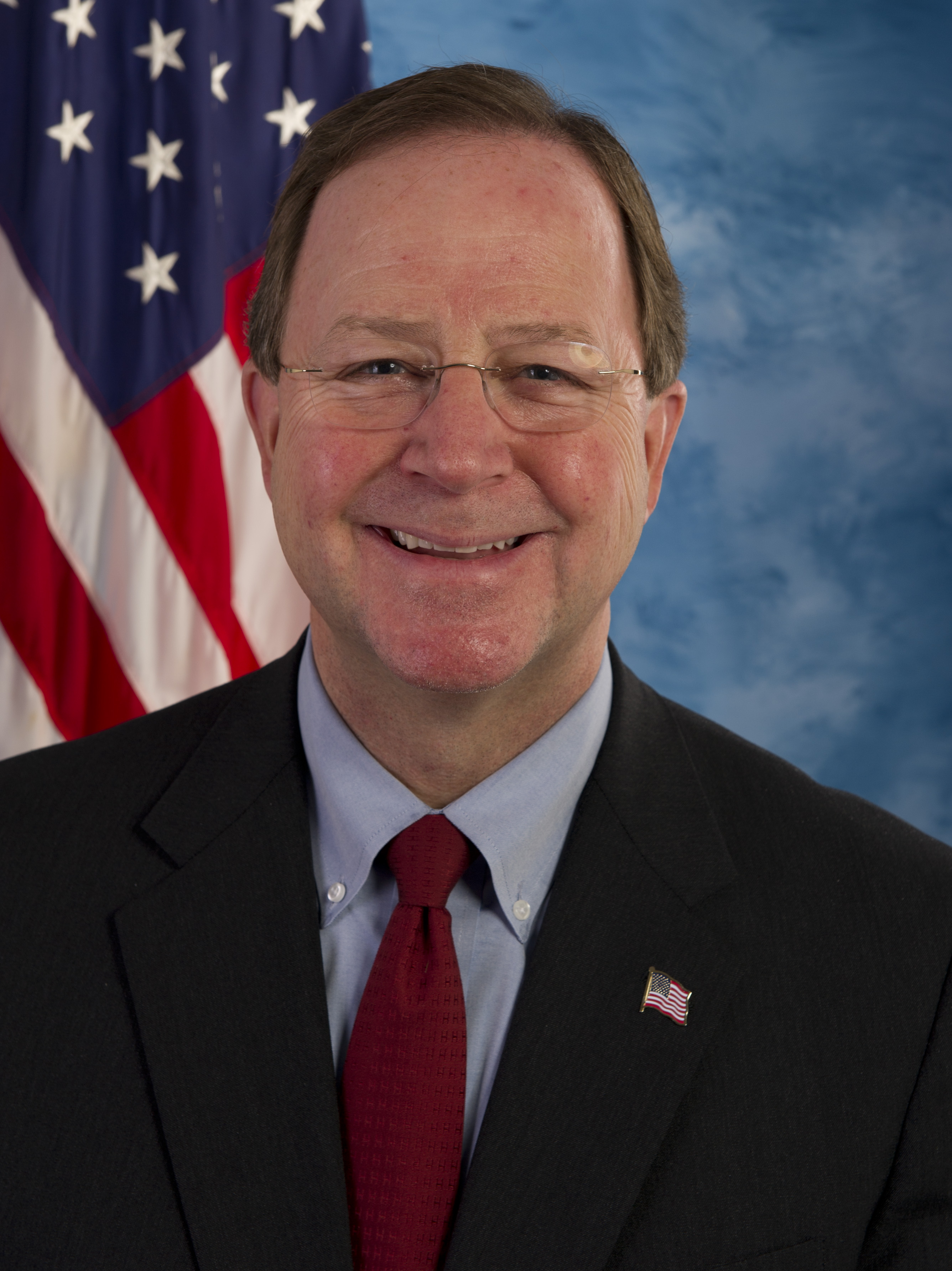
- Official portrait, 2011

Chair of the Electric Reliability Council of Texas
- Incumbent
- Assumed office September 30, 2024
- Preceded by: Paul Foster

Chair of the Republican Study Committee
- In office January 3, 2015 – January 3, 2017
- Preceded by: Rob Woodall
- Succeeded by: Mark Walker

Member of the U.S. House of Representatives from Texas's 17th district
- In office January 3, 2011 – January 3, 2021
- Preceded by: Chet Edwards
- Succeeded by: Pete Sessions

Personal details
- Born: William Hose Flores Sr. February 25, 1954 (age 72) Cheyenne, Wyoming, U.S.
- Party: Republican
- Spouse: Gina Flores
- Children: 2
- Education: Texas A&M University (BBA); Houston Baptist University (MBA)

William Hose Flores Sr. (/ˈflɔːrɛz/; born February 25, 1954) is an American businessman serving as the interim chair of the Electric Reliability Council of Texas (ERCOT) since 2024.

From 2011 to 2021, he was the U.S. representative for Texas's 17th congressional district. Flores chose not to seek re-election in 2020 after five terms in office. He was succeeded by Pete Sessions, the former U.S. representative for Texas's 32nd congressional district. Flores is a member of the Republican Party and the former chief executive officer of Phoenix Exploration Company, an oil and natural gas company.

== Early life and education ==
Flores was born in Cheyenne, Wyoming, at the F.E. Warren Air Force Base, where his father was serving in the military. He is the son of Ruth Ann Theresa (née Kennedy) and Joe Pete Flores. He grew up in Stratford in the Texas Panhandle. His paternal ancestors left Spain and settled in what is now Texas in 1725. Of his heritage, Flores has said, "My family came from Spain in 1725, and if people want to consider me Hispanic, they can, but I didn't advertise that way, and I'm an American first." He graduated with a BBA, cum laude in accounting from Texas A&M University in 1976. While there, he was a member of the Corps of Cadets, the MSC Student Conference on National Affairs, the Ross Volunteer Company, and Corps Staff. He also served as Student Body Vice-President of Finance during his senior year. He has been a licensed Certified Public Accountant since 1978. He also received a Master of Business Administration from Houston Baptist University in 1985.

== Business career ==
Flores served as the chief financial officer (CFO) for two publicly traded energy service firms from 1990 through 1998: Marine Drilling Companies, Inc. (1990–1997) and Western Atlas Inc. (1997–1998). From 2002 to 2005, Flores was the Senior Vice President and CFO of Gryphon Exploration Company.

In 2006, a group of five oil and gas industry executives, led by Flores as president and CEO, formed Phoenix Exploration Company with $350 million of capital commitments from a group of private equity firms that included Riverstone Holdings and Pinebrook Partners. The company was engaged in oil and gas exploration along the Gulf Coast and the Gulf of Mexico. Flores also served as a director of that company from its formation until he retired in December 2009 to run for public office.

Flores is a former commissioner of the Texas Real Estate Commission (appointed by Governor Rick Perry), and a past director and former chairman of the board of the Association of Former Students of Texas A&M University. He has also served on boards of Phoenix Exploration Company, Marine Drilling Companies, Inc., FreeBirds, Inc., and The PARC, Inc, and the Alley Theater of Houston.

He serves on the board of the Private Enterprise Research Center of Texas A&M University and as a member of the board of trustees of Houston Baptist University, where he serves as Vice Chair.

== U.S. House of Representatives ==
=== 2010 election ===
In late 2009, Flores entered the Republican primary for the 17th District, held by 10-term Democratic incumbent Chet Edwards. Flores claimed his worries about the future of "the American dream" inspired him to run for Congress. He committed a half million dollars of his own money to self-fund his campaign.

In the Republican primary runoff on April 13, he had defeated Rob Curnock by a 64–36 percent margin. The size of his primary victory was a surprise to many political observers because Curnock was the 2008 nominee and he held Edwards' 2008 vote total close to 50 percent, despite being heavily outspent. During the Republican primary, Flores received the endorsement of former Republican U.S. Senator Phil Gramm After the primary win, Flores was also endorsed by George H. W. Bush, John McCain, Mitt Romney, and Mike Huckabee.

Through December 21, 2010, Flores's campaign raised $3.5 million, of which $1.49 million came from Flores himself. He spent $3.3 million overall.

On November 2, 2010, Flores defeated Edwards with 62 percent of the vote. This was the largest margin of defeat for a Democratic incumbent in the 2010 cycle.

Flores won his fourth term in the U.S. House in the general election held on November 8, 2016. With 149,417 votes (60.8 percent), he defeated Democrat William Matta, who trailed with 86,603 ballots (35.2 percent) and Libertarian Clark Patterson with 9,708 (4 percent).

Flores won his fifth term in the U.S. House in the general election held on November 6, 2018. With 134,375 votes (56.9 percent), he defeated Democrat Rick Kennedy, who trailed with 97,574 ballots (41.3 percent) and Libertarian Peter Churchman with 4,415 (1.9 percent).

=== Political positions ===
Upon his swearing-in, Flores became the first Republican to represent Waco in Congress since Reconstruction. Flores supports limited government and lower taxes; an end to the spending of the American Recovery and Reinvestment Act; making the Bush-era tax cuts permanent; anti-abortion positions; and stronger enforcement at the U.S. Mexico border. Flores supports the building of new nuclear power plants to assist the U.S. in becoming energy self-sufficient. He also supports incentives for the development of solar and wind power. Flores is a member of the Conservative Republican Study Committee and the Congressional Hispanic Conference.

==== National security ====
Flores supported President Donald Trump's 2017 executive order to temporarily curtail Muslim immigration until better screening methods are devised. He stated that "Taking 120-day breath to evaluate the effectiveness of our vetting program is a smart thing to do."

==== Texas v. Pennsylvania ====
In December 2020, Flores was one of 126 Republican members of the House of Representatives who signed an amicus brief in support of Texas v. Pennsylvania, a lawsuit filed at the United States Supreme Court contesting the results of the 2020 presidential election, in which Joe Biden prevailed over incumbent Donald Trump. The Supreme Court declined to hear the case on the basis that Texas lacked standing under Article III of the Constitution to challenge the results of the election held by another state.

=== Republican Study Committee ===
On November 18, 2014, Flores was elected to the Chairmanship of the House Republican Study Committee. Flores was elected on the second ballot, securing 84 votes to South Carolina Representative Mick Mulvaney's 57.

=== Social media ===
During his tenure in Congress, Flores had blocked constituents from contacting him through social media.

=== Committee assignments ===
- Committee on Energy and Commerce
  - Subcommittee on Energy and Power
  - Subcommittee on Environment and the Economy
  - Subcommittee on Oversight and Investigation
- Committee on Veterans' Affairs
  - Subcommittee on Economic Opportunity
  - Subcommittee on Health

=== Caucus memberships ===
- House Baltic Caucus
- Congressional Western Caucus
- Veterinary Medicine Caucus
- Congressional Hispanic Conference

=== Legislation sponsored ===
- On July 18, 2013, Flores introduced the Protecting States’ Rights to Promote American Energy Security Act (H.R. 2728; 113th Congress). The bill would require the federal government to defer to individual states about regulations governing hydraulic fracturing. It passed the House of Representatives on November 20, 2013.

== Personal life ==
Flores is married to Gina, whom he met in high school. They have two sons. Flores attends Central Church, a church in Bryan.

Flores has served as a member of the Mays Business School Advisory Board, the Corps of Cadets Development Council, Corps of Cadets Association, the Houston A&M Club, the Brazos County A&M Club, and other roles at Texas A&M University. In 2003, he was honored as an outstanding alumnus of the Mays Business School of Texas A&M University. In 2010, he was also recognized as a 'Distinguished Alumnus' by Texas A&M University.

== Electoral history ==
2018 17th Congressional District of Texas Elections
Party	Candidate	Votes	%	±%
Republican	Bill Flores (I)	134,841	56.8%	
Democratic	Rick Kennedy	98,070	41.3%	
Libertarian	Peter Churchman	4,440	1.9%	

2016 17th Congressional District of Texas Elections
Party	Candidate	Votes	%	±%
Republican	Bill Flores (I)	149,157	60.8%	
Democratic	Bill Matta	61,245	35.2%	
Libertarian	Clark Patterson	9,685	3.9%	

2016 17th Congressional District of Texas Republican Primary Election
Party	Candidate	Votes	%	±%
Republican	Bill Flores (I)	60,502	72.4%	
Republican	Ralph Patterson	15,411	18.5%	
Republican	Caleb Sims	7,634	9.1%	

2014 17th Congressional District of Texas Elections
Party	Candidate	Votes	%	±%
Republican	Bill Flores (I)	85,807	64.58%	
Democratic	Nick Haynes	43,049	32.4%	
Libertarian	Shawn Michael Hamilton	4,009	3.02%	

2012 17th Congressional District of Texas Elections
Party	Candidate	Votes	%	±%
Republican	Bill Flores (I)	143,284	79.9%	
Libertarian	Ben Easton	35,978	20.1%	

2012 17th Congressional District of Texas Republican Primary Election
Party	Candidate	Votes	%	±%
Republican	Bill Flores (I)	40,913	82.6%	
Republican	George W. Hindman	8,628	17.4%	

2010 17th Congressional District of Texas Elections
Party	Candidate	Votes	%	±%
Republican	Bill Flores	106,275	61.8%	
Democratic	Chet Edwards	62,926	36.6%	

== See also ==
- List of Hispanic and Latino Americans in the United States Congress

U.S. House of Representatives
Preceded by Chet Edwards	Member of the U.S. House of Representatives from Texas's 17th congressional district 2011–2021	Succeeded by Pete Sessions
Party political offices
Preceded by Rob Woodall	Chair of the Republican Study Committee; 2015–2017	Succeeded by Mark Walker
U.S. order of precedence (ceremonial)
Preceded by Nick Lampson as Former U.S. Representative	Order of precedence of the United States as Former U.S. Representative	Succeeded by Tom Barrett as Former U.S. Representative
