= 1986 United States House of Representatives elections in Texas =

- November 4, 1986

All 27 Texas seats to the United States House of Representatives
	Majority party	Minority party
Party	Democratic	Republican
Last election	17	10
Seats won	17	10
Seat change	Steady	Steady
Popular vote	1,716,978	1,263,413
Percentage	57.0%	42.0%
Swing	▼0.6%	▼0.3%
Democratic
50–60%
60–70%
70–80%
90>%
Republican
50–60%
60–70%
70–80%
80–90%
90>%

The 1986 United States House of Representatives elections in Texas occurred on November 4, 1986, to elect the members of the state of Texas's delegation to the United States House of Representatives. Texas had twenty-seven seats in the House, apportioned according to the 1980 United States census.

These elections occurred simultaneously with the United States Senate elections of 1986, the United States House elections in other states, and various state and local elections.

Democrats maintained their majority of U.S. House seats from Texas, but Republicans retained the four seats they gained in 1984 under the coattails of Ronald Reagan's re-election.

== Overview ==
1986 United States House of Representatives elections in Texas
Party	Votes	Percentage	Seats before	Seats after	+/–
Democratic	1,716,978	57.03%	17	17	-
Republican	1,263,413	41.97%	10	10	-
Libertarian	13,005	0.43%	0	0	-
Independent	17,010	0.57%	0	0	-
Totals	3,010,406	100.00%	27	27	-

== Congressional districts ==
=== District 1 ===
Incumbent Democrat Sam B. Hall resigned to become a U.S. District Judge. This prompted a special election to be held. Republicans saw this special election as a prime opportunity to demonstrate the political realignment of East Texas, as the district had supported Republicans Ronald Reagan and Phil Gramm in 1984. Gramm had arranged Hall's appointment to the judiciary in an attempt to see a Republican elected from the area. In the end, however, Democrat Jim Chapman narrowly won the election in a runoff. He ran for re-election unopposed.

Texas's 1st congressional district, 1986
Party	Candidate	Votes	%
Democratic	Jim Chapman (incumbent)	84,445	100.00
Total votes		84,445	100
Democratic hold			

=== District 2 ===
Incumbent Democrat Charlie Wilson ran for re-election.

Texas's 2nd congressional district, 1986
Party	Candidate	Votes	%
Democratic	Charlie Wilson (incumbent)	78,529	56.76
Republican	Julian Gordon	55,986	40.47
Independent	Sam Paradice	3,838	2.77
Total votes		138,353	100
Democratic hold			

=== District 3 ===
Incumbent Republican Steve Bartlett ran for re-election.

Texas's 3rd congressional district, 1986
Party	Candidate	Votes	%
Republican	Steve Bartlett (incumbent)	143,381	94.09
Independent	Brent Barnes	6,268	4.11
Libertarian	Don Goush	2,736	1.80
Total votes		152,385	100
Republican hold			

=== District 4 ===
Incumbent Democrat Ralph Hall ran for re-election.

Texas's 4th congressional district, 1986
Party	Candidate	Votes	%
Democratic	Ralph Hall (incumbent)	97,540	71.66
Republican	Thomas Blow	38,578	28.34
Total votes		136,118	100
Democratic hold			

=== District 5 ===
Incumbent Democrat John Wiley Bryant ran for re-election.

Texas's 5th congressional district, 1986
Party	Candidate	Votes	%
Democratic	John Wiley Bryant (incumbent)	57,410	58.52
Republican	Tom Carter	39,945	40.72
Libertarian	Bob Brewer	749	0.76
Total votes		98,104	100
Democratic hold			

=== District 6 ===
Incumbent Republican Joe Barton ran for re-election.

Texas's 6th congressional district, 1986
Party	Candidate	Votes	%
Republican	Joe Barton (incumbent)	86,190	55.80
Democratic	Pete Geren	68,270	44.20
Total votes		154,460	100
Republican hold			

=== District 7 ===
Incumbent Republican Bill Archer ran for re-election.

Texas's 7th congressional district, 1986
Party	Candidate	Votes	%
Republican	Bill Archer (incumbent)	129,673	87.38
Democratic	Harry Kniffen	17,635	11.88
Libertarian	Roger Plail	1,087	0.73
Total votes		148,395	100
Republican hold			

=== District 8 ===
Incumbent Republican Jack Fields ran for re-election.

Texas's 8th congressional district, 1986
Party	Candidate	Votes	%
Republican	Jack Fields (incumbent)	66,280	68.40
Democratic	Blaine Mann	30,617	31.60
Write-in	Wesley Moshay	6	0.01
Total votes		96,903	100
Republican hold			

=== District 9 ===
Incumbent Democrat Jack Brooks ran for re-election.

Texas's 9th congressional district, 1986
Party	Candidate	Votes	%
Democratic	Jack Brooks (incumbent)	73,285	61.52
Republican	Lisa Duperier	45,834	38.48
Total votes		119,119	100
Democratic hold			

=== District 10 ===
Incumbent Democrat J. J. Pickle ran for re-election.

Texas's 10th congressional district, 1986
Party	Candidate	Votes	%
Democratic	J. J. Pickle (incumbent)	135,863	72.32
Republican	Carole Keeton Rylander	52,000	27.68
Total votes		187,863	100
Democratic hold			

=== District 11 ===
Incumbent Democrat Marvin Leath ran for re-election unopposed.

Texas's 11th congressional district, 1986
Party	Candidate	Votes	%
Democratic	Marvin Leath (incumbent)	84,201	100.00
Total votes		84,201	100
Democratic hold			

=== District 12 ===
Incumbent Democrat Jim Wright ran for re-election. He was subsequently elected Speaker of the House.

Texas's 12th congressional district, 1986
Party	Candidate	Votes	%
Democratic	Jim Wright (incumbent)	84,831	68.72
Republican	Don McNeil	38,620	31.28
Total votes		123,451	100
Democratic hold			

=== District 13 ===
Incumbent Republican Beau Boulter ran for re-election.

Texas's 13th congressional district, 1986
Party	Candidate	Votes	%
Republican	Beau Boulter (incumbent)	84,980	64.93
Democratic	Doug Steal	45,907	35.07
Total votes		130,887	100
Republican hold			

=== District 14 ===
Incumbent Republican Mac Sweeney ran for re-election.

Texas's 14th congressional district, 1986
Party	Candidate	Votes	%
Republican	Mac Sweeney (incumbent)	74,471	52.33
Democratic	Greg Laughlin	67,852	47.67
Total votes		142,323	100
Republican hold			

=== District 15 ===
Incumbent Democrat Kika de la Garza ran for re-election unopposed.

Texas's 15th congressional district, 1986
Party	Candidate	Votes	%
Democratic	Kika de la Garza (incumbent)	70,777	100.00
Total votes		70,777	100
Democratic hold			

=== District 16 ===
Incumbent Democrat Ronald D. Coleman ran for re-election.

Texas's 16th congressional district, 1986
Party	Candidate	Votes	%
Democratic	Ronald D. Coleman (incumbent)	50,590	65.69
Republican	Roy Gillia	26,421	34.31
Total votes		77,011	100
Democratic hold			

=== District 17 ===
Incumbent Democrat Charles Stenholm ran for re-election unopposed.

Texas's 17th congressional district, 1986
Party	Candidate	Votes	%
Democratic	Charles Stenholm (incumbent)	97,791	100.00
Total votes		97,791	100
Democratic hold			

=== District 18 ===
Incumbent Democrat Mickey Leland ran for re-election.

Texas's 18th congressional district, 1986
Party	Candidate	Votes	%
Democratic	Mickey Leland (incumbent)	63,335	90.20
Independent	Joanne Kuniansky	6,884	9.80
Total votes		70,219	100
Democratic hold			

=== District 19 ===
Incumbent Republican Larry Combest ran for re-election.

Texas's 19th congressional district, 1986
Party	Candidate	Votes	%
Republican	Larry Combest (incumbent)	68,695	61.99
Democratic	Gerald McCathern	42,129	38.01
Total votes		110,824	100
Republican hold			

=== District 20 ===
Incumbent Democrat Henry B. González ran for re-election unopposed.

Texas's 20th congressional district, 1986
Party	Candidate	Votes	%
Democratic	Henry B. Gonzalez (incumbent)	55,363	100.00
Total votes		55,363	100
Democratic hold			

=== District 21 ===
Incumbent Republican Tom Loeffler retired to run for governor.

Texas's 21st congressional district, 1986
Party	Candidate	Votes	%
Republican	Lamar Smith	100,346	60.61
Democratic	Pete Snelson	63,779	38.52
Libertarian	Jim Robinson	1,432	0.86
Write-in	Others	10	0.01
Total votes		165,567	100
Republican hold			

=== District 22 ===
Incumbent Republican Tom DeLay ran for re-election.

Texas's 22nd congressional district, 1986
Party	Candidate	Votes	%
Republican	Tom DeLay (incumbent)	76,459	71.77
Democratic	Susan Director	30,079	28.23
Total votes		106,538	100
Republican hold			

=== District 23 ===
Incumbent Democrat Albert Bustamante ran for re-election.

Texas's 23rd congressional district, 1986
Party	Candidate	Votes	%
Democratic	Albert Bustamante (incumbent)	68,131	90.68
Libertarian	Ken Hendrix	7,001	9.32
Total votes		75,132	100
Democratic hold			

=== District 24 ===
Incumbent Democrat Martin Frost ran for re-election.

Texas's 24th congressional district, 1986
Party	Candidate	Votes	%
Democratic	Martin Frost (incumbent)	69,368	67.22
Republican	Bob Burk	33,819	32.77
Write-in	Others	4	0.00
Total votes		103,191	100
Democratic hold			

=== District 25 ===
Incumbent Democrat Michael A. Andrews ran for re-election unopposed.

Texas's 25th congressional district, 1986
Party	Candidate	Votes	%
Democratic	Michael A. Andrews (incumbent)	67,435	100.00
Total votes		67,435	100
Democratic hold			

=== District 26 ===
Incumbent Republican Dick Armey ran for re-election. Former representative Tom Vandergriff had considered running to regain the seat he had previously held from 1983 to 1985, but he ultimately declined.

Texas's 26th congressional district, 1986
Party	Candidate	Votes	%
Republican	Dick Armey (incumbent)	101,735	68.10
Democratic	George Richardson	47,651	31.90
Total votes		149,386	100
Republican hold			

=== District 27 ===
Incumbent Democrat Solomon Ortiz ran for re-election unopposed.

Texas's 27th congressional district, 1986
Party	Candidate	Votes	%
Democratic	Solomon Ortiz (incumbent)	64,165	100.00
Total votes		64,165	100
Democratic hold			
