= 1988 United States House of Representatives elections in Texas =

- November 8, 1988

All 27 Texas seats to the United States House of Representatives
	Majority party	Minority party
Party	Democratic	Republican
Last election	17	10
Seats won	19	8
Seat change	▲2	▼2
Popular vote	2,735,940	1,834,135
Percentage	58.6%	39.3%
Swing	▲1.6%	▼2.7%
Democratic
50–60%
60–70%
70–80%
80–90%
90>%
Republican
60–70%
70–80%
80–90%
90>%

The 1988 United States House of Representatives elections in Texas occurred on November 8, 1988, to elect the members of the state of Texas's delegation to the United States House of Representatives. Texas had twenty-seven seats in the House, apportioned according to the 1980 United States census.

These elections occurred simultaneously with the United States Senate elections of 1988, the United States House elections in other states, the presidential election, and various state and local elections.

Democrats maintained their majority of U.S. House seats from Texas, flipping two seats from the Republicans, increasing their majority to nineteen out of twenty seven seats.

== Overview ==
1988 United States House of Representatives elections in Texas
Party	Votes	Percentage	Seats before	Seats after	+/–
Democratic	2,735,940	58.59%	17	19	+2
Republican	1,834,135	39.28%	10	8	-2
Libertarian	98,602	2.11%	0	0	-
Independent	1,013	0.02%	0	0	-
Totals	4,669,690	100.00%	27	27	-

== Congressional districts ==
=== District 1 ===
Incumbent Democrat Jim Chapman ran for re-election.

Texas's 1st congressional district, 1988
Party	Candidate	Votes	%
Democratic	Jim Chapman (incumbent)	122,566	62.24
Republican	Horace McQueen	74,357	37.76
Total votes		196,923	100
Democratic hold			

=== District 2 ===
Incumbent Democrat Charlie Wilson ran for re-election.

Texas's 2nd congressional district, 1988
Party	Candidate	Votes	%
Democratic	Charlie Wilson (incumbent)	145,614	87.67
Libertarian	Gary Nelson	20,475	12.33
Total votes		166,089	100
Democratic hold			

=== District 3 ===
Incumbent Republican Steve Bartlett ran for re-election.

Texas's 3rd congressional district, 1988
Party	Candidate	Votes	%
Republican	Steve Bartlett (incumbent)	227,882	81.82
Democratic	Blake Cowden	50,627	18.18
Total votes		278,509	100
Republican hold			

=== District 4 ===
Incumbent Democrat Ralph Hall ran for re-election.

Texas's 4th congressional district, 1988
Party	Candidate	Votes	%
Democratic	Ralph Hall (incumbent)	139,379	66.41
Republican	Randy Sutton	67,379	32.09
Libertarian	Melanie Dunn	3,152	1.50
Total votes		209,868	100
Democratic hold			

=== District 5 ===
Incumbent Democrat John Wiley Bryant ran for re-election.

Texas's 5th congressional district, 1988
Party	Candidate	Votes	%
Democratic	John Wiley Bryant (incumbent)	95,376	60.73
Republican	Lon Williams	59,877	38.13
Libertarian	Ken Ashby	1,786	1.14
Total votes		157,039	100
Democratic hold			

=== District 6 ===
Incumbent Republican Joe Barton ran for re-election.

Texas's 6th congressional district, 1988
Party	Candidate	Votes	%
Republican	Joe Barton (incumbent)	164,692	67.64
Democratic	Pat Kendrick	78,786	32.36
Total votes		243,478	100
Republican hold			

=== District 7 ===
Incumbent Republican Bill Archer ran for re-election.

Texas's 7th congressional district, 1988
Party	Candidate	Votes	%
Republican	Bill Archer (incumbent)	185,203	79.14
Democratic	Dianne Richards	48,824	20.86
Total votes		234,027	100
Republican hold			

=== District 8 ===
Incumbent Republican Jack Fields ran for re-election unopposed.

Texas's 8th congressional district, 1988
Party	Candidate	Votes	%
Republican	Jack Fields (incumbent)	90,503	100.00
Total votes		90,503	100
Republican hold			

=== District 9 ===
Incumbent Democrat Jack Brooks ran for re-election unopposed.

Texas's 9th congressional district, 1988
Party	Candidate	Votes	%
Democratic	Jack Brooks (incumbent)	137,270	100.00
Total votes		137,270	100
Democratic hold			

=== District 10 ===
Incumbent Democrat J. J. Pickle ran for re-election.

Texas's 10th congressional district, 1988
Party	Candidate	Votes	%
Democratic	J. J. Pickle (incumbent)	232,213	93.45
Libertarian	Vincent May	16,281	6.55
Total votes		248,494	100
Democratic hold			

=== District 11 ===
Incumbent Democrat Marvin Leath ran for re-election.

Texas's 11th congressional district, 1988
Party	Candidate	Votes	%
Democratic	Marvin Leath (incumbent)	134,207	95.36
Libertarian	Frederick King	6,533	4.64
Total votes		140,740	100
Democratic hold			

=== District 12 ===
Incumbent Democratic Speaker of the United States House of Representatives Jim Wright ran for re-election.

Texas's 12th congressional district, 1988
Party	Candidate	Votes	%
Democratic	Jim Wright (incumbent)	135,459	99.27
Write-in	Jim Ryan	767	0.56
Write-in	Gary Johnson	230	0.17
Total votes		136,456	100
Democratic hold			

=== District 13 ===
Incumbent Republican Beau Boulter retired to run for U.S. Senator.

Texas's 13th congressional district, 1988
Party	Candidate	Votes	%
Democratic	Bill Sarpalius	98,345	52.46
Republican	Larry Milner	89,105	47.54
Total votes		187,450	100.00
Democratic gain from Republican			

=== District 14 ===
Incumbent Republican Mac Sweeney ran for re-election.

Texas's 14th congressional district, 1988
Party	Candidate	Votes	%
Democratic	Greg Laughlin	111,395	53.24
Republican	Mac Sweeney (incumbent)	96,042	45.91
Libertarian	Don Kelley	1,779	0.85
Total votes		209,216	100.00
Democratic gain from Republican			

=== District 15 ===
Incumbent Democrat Kika de la Garza ran for re-election.

Texas's 15th congressional district, 1988
Party	Candidate	Votes	%
Democratic	Kika de la Garza (incumbent)	93,672	93.86
Libertarian	Gloria Joyce Hendrix	6,133	6.14
Total votes		99,805	100
Democratic hold			

=== District 16 ===
Incumbent Democrat Ronald D. Coleman ran for re-election unopposed.

Texas's 16th congressional district, 1988
Party	Candidate	Votes	%
Democratic	Ronald D. Coleman (incumbent)	104,504	100.00
Total votes		104,504	100
Democratic hold			

=== District 17 ===
Incumbent Democrat Charles Stenholm ran for re-election unopposed.

Texas's 17th congressional district, 1988
Party	Candidate	Votes	%
Democratic	Charles Stenholm (incumbent)	149,064	100.00
Total votes		149,064	100
Democratic hold			

=== District 18 ===
Incumbent Democrat Mickey Leland ran for re-election.

Texas's 18th congressional district, 1988
Party	Candidate	Votes	%
Democratic	Mickey Leland (incumbent)	94,408	92.88
Libertarian	J. Alejandro Snead	7,235	7.12
Total votes		101,643	100
Democratic hold			

=== District 19 ===
Incumbent Republican Larry Combest ran for re-election.

Texas's 19th congressional district, 1988
Party	Candidate	Votes	%
Republican	Larry Combest (incumbent)	113,068	67.71
Democratic	Gerald McCathern	53,932	32.29
Total votes		167,000	100
Republican hold			

=== District 20 ===
Incumbent Democrat Henry B. González ran for re-election.

Texas's 20th congressional district, 1988
Party	Candidate	Votes	%
Democratic	Henry B. Gonzalez (incumbent)	94,527	70.70
Republican	Lee Trevino	36,801	27.53
Libertarian	Theresa Doyle	2,368	1.77
Total votes		133,696	100
Democratic hold			

=== District 21 ===
Incumbent Republican Lamar Smith ran for re-election.

Texas's 21st congressional district, 1988
Party	Candidate	Votes	%
Republican	Lamar Smith (incumbent)	203,989	93.24
Libertarian	James Robinson	14,801	6.76
Total votes		218,790	100
Republican hold			

=== District 22 ===
Incumbent Republican Tom DeLay ran for re-election.

Texas's 22nd congressional district, 1988
Party	Candidate	Votes	%
Republican	Tom DeLay (incumbent)	125,733	67.42
Democratic	Wayne Walker	58,471	31.35
Libertarian	George Harper	2,276	1.22
Write-in	L.A. Sims	4	0.00
Total votes		186,484	100
Republican hold			

=== District 23 ===
Incumbent Democrat Albert Bustamante ran for re-election.

Texas's 23rd congressional district, 1988
Party	Candidate	Votes	%
Democratic	Albert Bustamante (incumbent)	116,423	64.53
Republican	Jerome Gonzales	60,559	33.56
Libertarian	Tony Garza	3,448	1.91
Total votes		180,430	100
Democratic hold			

=== District 24 ===
Incumbent Democrat Martin Frost ran for re-election.

Texas's 24th congressional district, 1988
Party	Candidate	Votes	%
Democratic	Martin Frost (incumbent)	135,794	92.61
Libertarian	Leo Sadovy	10,841	7.39
Total votes		146,635	100
Democratic hold			

=== District 25 ===
Incumbent Democrat Michael A. Andrews ran for re-election.

Texas's 25th congressional district, 1988
Party	Candidate	Votes	%
Democratic	Michael A. Andrews (incumbent)	113,499	71.37
Republican	George Loeffler	44,043	27.69
Libertarian	Kevin Southwick	1,494	0.94
Total votes		159,036	100
Democratic hold			

=== District 26 ===
Incumbent Republican Dick Armey ran for re-election.

Texas's 26th congressional district, 1988
Party	Candidate	Votes	%
Republican	Dick Armey (incumbent)	194,944	69.27
Democratic	Jo Ann Reyes	86,490	30.73
Write-in	Dee Turner	12	0.00
Total votes		281,446	100
Republican hold			

=== District 27 ===
Incumbent Democrat Solomon Ortiz ran for re-election unopposed.

Texas's 27th congressional district, 1988
Party	Candidate	Votes	%
Democratic	Solomon Ortiz (incumbent)	105,085	100.00
Total votes		105,085	100
Democratic hold			
