= 1990 United States House of Representatives elections in Texas =

- November 6, 1990

All 27 Texas seats to the United States House of Representatives
	Majority party	Minority party
Party	Democratic	Republican
Last election	19	8
Seats won	19	8
Seat change	Steady	Steady
Popular vote	1,763,432	1,498,096
Percentage	53.8%	45.7%
Swing	▼4.8%	▲6.4%
Democratic
50–60%
60–70%
70–80%
>90%
Republican
60–70%
70–80%
>90%

The 1990 United States House of Representatives elections in Texas occurred on November 6, 1990, to elect the members of the state of Texas's delegation to the United States House of Representatives. Texas had twenty-seven seats in the House, apportioned according to the 1980 United States census.

These elections occurred simultaneously with the United States Senate elections of 1990, the United States House elections in other states, and various state and local elections.

== Overview ==
1990 United States House of Representatives elections in Texas
Party	Votes	Percentage	Seats before	Seats after	+/–
Democratic	1,763,432	53.79%	19	19	-
Republican	1,498,096	45.70%	8	8	-
Libertarian	11,844	0.36%	0	0	-
Independent	4,886	0.15%	0	0	-
Totals	3,278,258	100.00%	27	27	-

== Congressional districts ==
=== District 1 ===
Incumbent Democrat Jim Chapman ran for re-election.

Texas's 1st congressional district, 1990
Party	Candidate	Votes	%
Democratic	Jim Chapman (incumbent)	89,241	61.04
Republican	Hamp Hodges	56,954	38.96
Total votes		146,195	100
Democratic hold			

=== District 2 ===
Incumbent Democrat Charlie Wilson ran for re-election.

Texas's 2nd congressional district, 1990
Party	Candidate	Votes	%
Democratic	Charlie Wilson (incumbent)	76,974	55.57
Republican	Donna Peterson	61,555	44.43
Total votes		138,529	100
Democratic hold			

=== District 3 ===
Incumbent Republican Steve Bartlett ran for re-election.

Texas's 3rd congressional district, 1990
Party	Candidate	Votes	%
Republican	Steve Bartlett (incumbent)	153,857	99.60
Write-in	Noel Kopala	617	0.40
Total votes		154,474	100
Republican hold			

=== District 4 ===
Incumbent Democrat Ralph Hall ran for re-election.

Texas's 4th congressional district, 1990
Party	Candidate	Votes	%
Democratic	Ralph Hall (incumbent)	108,300	99.64
Write-in	Tim McCord	394	0.36
Total votes		108,694	100
Democratic hold			

=== District 5 ===
Incumbent Democrat John Wiley Bryant ran for re-election.

Texas's 5th congressional district, 1990
Party	Candidate	Votes	%
Democratic	John Wiley Bryant (incumbent)	65,228	59.58
Republican	Jerry Rucker	41,307	37.73
Libertarian	Kenneth Ashby	2,939	2.68
Total votes		109,474	100
Democratic hold			

=== District 6 ===
Incumbent Republican Joe Barton ran for re-election.

Texas's 6th congressional district, 1990
Party	Candidate	Votes	%
Republican	Joe Barton (incumbent)	125,049	66.47
Democratic	John Welch	62,344	33.14
Write-in	Michael Worsham	737	0.39
Total votes		188,130	100
Republican hold			

=== District 7 ===
Incumbent Republican Bill Archer ran for re-election unopposed.

Texas's 7th congressional district, 1990
Party	Candidate	Votes	%
Republican	Bill Archer (incumbent)	114,254	100.00
Total votes		114,254	100
Republican hold			

=== District 8 ===
Incumbent Republican Jack Fields ran for re-election unopposed.

Texas's 8th congressional district, 1990
Party	Candidate	Votes	%
Republican	Jack Fields (incumbent)	60,603	100.00
Total votes		60,603	100
Republican hold			

=== District 9 ===
Incumbent Democrat Jack Brooks ran for re-election.

Texas's 9th congressional district, 1990
Party	Candidate	Votes	%
Democratic	Jack Brooks (incumbent)	79,786	57.74
Republican	Maury Myers	58,399	42.26
Total votes		138,185	100
Democratic hold			

=== District 10 ===
Incumbent Democrat J. J. Pickle ran for re-election.

Texas's 10th congressional district, 1990
Party	Candidate	Votes	%
Democratic	J. J. Pickle (incumbent)	152,784	64.88
Republican	David Beilharz	73,766	31.32
Libertarian	Jeff Davis	8,905	3.78
Write-in	Others	41	0.02
Total votes		235,496	100
Democratic hold			

=== District 11 ===
Incumbent Democrat Marvin Leath opted to retire rather than run for re-election.

Texas's 11th congressional district, 1990
Party	Candidate	Votes	%
Democratic	Chet Edwards	73,810	53.45
Republican	Hugh Shine	64,269	46.55
Total votes		138,079	100
Democratic hold			

=== District 12 ===
Incumbent Democratic Speaker of the United States House of Representatives Jim Wright resigned on June 6, 1989, amid an ethics investigation. This prompted a special election to be held, which fellow Democrat Pete Geren won in a runoff. He ran for re-election.

Texas's 12th congressional district, 1990
Party	Candidate	Votes	%
Democratic	Pete Geren (incumbent)	98,026	71.31
Republican	Mike McGinn	39,438	28.69
Total votes		137,464	100
Democratic hold			

=== District 13 ===
Incumbent Democrat Bill Sarpalius ran for re-election.

Texas's 13th congressional district, 1990
Party	Candidate	Votes	%
Democratic	Bill Sarpalius (incumbent)	81,815	56.48
Republican	Dick Waterfield	63,045	43.52
Total votes		144,860	100
Democratic hold			

=== District 14 ===
Incumbent Democrat Greg Laughlin ran for re-election.

Texas's 14th congressional district, 1990
Party	Candidate	Votes	%
Democratic	Greg Laughlin (incumbent)	89,251	54.31
Republican	Joe Dial	75,098	45.69
Total votes		164,349	100
Democratic hold			

=== District 15 ===
Incumbent Democrat Kika de la Garza ran for re-election unopposed.

Texas's 14th congressional district, 1990
Party	Candidate	Votes	%
Democratic	Kika de la Garza (incumbent)	72,461	100.00
Total votes		72,461	100
Democratic hold			

=== District 16 ===
Incumbent Democrat Ronald D. Coleman ran for re-election.

Texas's 16th congressional district, 1990
Party	Candidate	Votes	%
Democratic	Ronald D. Coleman (incumbent)	62,455	95.63
Write-in	William Burgett	2,854	4.37
Total votes		65,309	100
Democratic hold			

=== District 17 ===
Incumbent Democrat Charles Stenholm ran for re-election unopposed.

Texas's 17th congressional district, 1990
Party	Candidate	Votes	%
Democratic	Charles Stenholm (incumbent)	104,100	100.00
Total votes		104,100	100
Democratic hold			

=== District 18 ===
Incumbent Democrat Mickey Leland died in a plane crash on August 7, 1989, en route to Fugnido, Ethiopia. This prompted a special election to be held, which fellow Democrat Craig Washington won in a runoff. He ran for re-election.

Texas's 18th congressional district, 1990
Party	Candidate	Votes	%
Democratic	Craig Washington (incumbent)	54,477	99.56
Write-in	Others	243	0.44
Total votes		54,720	100
Democratic hold			

=== District 19 ===
Incumbent Republican Larry Combest ran for re-election unopposed.

Texas's 19th congressional district, 1990
Party	Candidate	Votes	%
Republican	Larry Combest (incumbent)	83,795	100.00
Total votes		83,795	100
Republican hold			

=== District 20 ===
Incumbent Democrat Henry B. González ran for re-election unopposed.

Texas's 20th congressional district, 1990
Party	Candidate	Votes	%
Democratic	Henry B. Gonzalez (incumbent)	56,318	100.00
Total votes		56,318	100
Democratic hold			

=== District 21 ===
Incumbent Republican Lamar Smith ran for re-election.

Texas's 21st congressional district, 1990
Party	Candidate	Votes	%
Republican	Lamar Smith (incumbent)	144,570	74.85
Democratic	Kirby Roberts	48,585	25.15
Total votes		193,155	100
Republican hold			

=== District 22 ===
Incumbent Republican Tom DeLay ran for re-election.

Texas's 22nd congressional district, 1990
Party	Candidate	Votes	%
Republican	Tom DeLay (incumbent)	93,425	71.24
Democratic	Bruce Director	37,721	28.76
Total votes		131,146	100
Republican hold			

=== District 23 ===
Incumbent Democrat Albert Bustamante ran for re-election.

Texas's 23rd congressional district, 1990
Party	Candidate	Votes	%
Democratic	Albert Bustamante (incumbent)	71,052	63.49
Republican	Jerome Gonzales	40,856	36.51
Total votes		111,908	100
Democratic hold			

=== District 24 ===
Incumbent Democrat Martin Frost ran for re-election unopposed.

Texas's 24th congressional district, 1990
Party	Candidate	Votes	%
Democratic	Martin Frost (incumbent)	86,297	100.00
Total votes		86,297	100
Democratic hold			

=== District 25 ===
Incumbent Democrat Michael A. Andrews ran for re-election unopposed.

Texas's 25th congressional district, 1990
Party	Candidate	Votes	%
Democratic	Michael A. Andrews (incumbent)	67,427	100.00
Total votes		67,427	100
Democratic hold			

=== District 26 ===
Incumbent Republican Dick Armey ran for re-election.

Texas's 26th congressional district, 1990
Party	Candidate	Votes	%
Republican	Dick Armey (incumbent)	147,856	70.40
Democratic	John Wayne Caton	62,158	29.60
Total votes		210,014	100
Republican hold			

=== District 27 ===
Incumbent Democrat Solomon Ortiz ran for re-election unopposed.

Texas's 27th congressional district, 1990
Party	Candidate	Votes	%
Democratic	Solomon Ortiz (incumbent)	62,822	100.00
Total votes		62,822	100
Democratic hold			
