= 1984 United States House of Representatives elections in Texas =

- November 6, 1984

All 27 Texas seats to the United States House of Representatives
	Majority party	Minority party
Party	Democratic	Republican
Last election	22	5
Seats before	21	6
Seats won	17	10
Seat change	▼4	▲4
Popular vote	2,695,028	1,981,823
Percentage	57.6%	42.3%
Swing	▼7.2%	▲9.5%
Democratic
50–60%
60–70%
70–80%
90>%
Republican
50–60%
60–70%
80–90%

The 1984 United States House of Representatives elections in Texas occurred on November 6, 1984, to elect the members of the state of Texas's delegation to the United States House of Representatives. Texas had twenty-seven seats in the House, apportioned according to the 1980 United States census.

Texas underwent mid-decade redistricting due to the District Court case Upham v. Seamon. The U.S. Department of Justice objected to the boundaries of District 15 and District 27 adopted by the Texas Legislature in 1981 under preclearance established by Section 5 of the Voting Rights Act of 1965. The court's modified districts were used in 1982, and the Legislature modified other districts in 1983, keeping the court-modified districts in place.

These elections occurred simultaneously with the United States Senate elections of 1984, the United States House elections in other states, the presidential election, and various state and local elections.

Democrats maintained their majority of U.S. House seats from Texas. Still, they lost four seats to the Republicans, who rode the coattails of president Ronald Reagan's re-election. The Republicans in those four seats, as well as two other freshmen Republicans, would later become known as the Texas Six Pack.

== Overview ==
1984 United States House of Representatives elections in Texas
Party	Votes	Percentage	Seats before	Seats after	+/–
Democratic	2,695,028	57.58%	21	17	-4
Republican	1,981,823	42.34%	6	10	+4
Independent	3,064	0.07%	0	0	-
Others	470	0.01%	0	0	-
Totals	4,680,385	100.00%	27	27	-

== Congressional districts ==
=== District 1 ===
Incumbent Democrat Sam B. Hall ran for re-election unopposed.

Texas's 1st congressional district, 1984
Party	Candidate	Votes	%
Democratic	Sam B. Hall (incumbent)	139,829	100.00
Total votes		139,829	100
Democratic hold			

=== District 2 ===
Incumbent Democrat Charlie Wilson ran for re-election. He faced four primary opponents but managed to avoid a runoff with 54 percent of the vote.

Texas's 2nd congressional district, 1984
Party	Candidate	Votes	%
Democratic	Charlie Wilson (incumbent)	113,225	59.26
Republican	Louis Dugas	77,842	40.74
Total votes		191,067	100
Democratic hold			

=== District 3 ===
Incumbent Republican Steve Bartlett ran for re-election.

Texas's 3rd congressional district, 1984
Party	Candidate	Votes	%
Republican	Steve Bartlett (incumbent)	228,819	82.99
Democratic	Jim Westbrook	46,890	17.01
Total votes		275,709	100
Republican hold			

=== District 4 ===
Incumbent Democrat Ralph Hall ran for re-election.

Texas's 4th congressional district, 1984
Party	Candidate	Votes	%
Democratic	Ralph Hall (incumbent)	120,749	57.96
Republican	Thomas Blow	87,553	42.02
Write-in	Others	39	0.02
Total votes		208,341	100
Democratic hold			

=== District 5 ===
Incumbent Democrat John Wiley Bryant ran for re-election unopposed.

Texas's 5th congressional district, 1984
Party	Candidate	Votes	%
Democratic	John Wiley Bryant (incumbent)	94,391	100.00
Total votes		94,391	100
Democratic hold			

=== District 6 ===
Incumbent Democrat Phil Gramm resigned after being removed from his seat on the House Budget Committee by Democratic leadership. He subsequently switched his party affiliation to the Republican Party and ran for his old seat in the ensuing special election. He had been planning to switch parties even before this occurred. Ronald Reagan had won the district in 1980, and Gramm's opponents cast the race as a referendum on Reganomics. Gramm won the race outright, avoiding a runoff and returning to Congress as a Republican. He retired at the end of his term to run for U.S. Senator.

Texas's 6th congressional district, 1984
Party	Candidate	Votes	%
Republican	Joe Barton	131,482	56.60
Democratic	Dan Kubiak	100,799	43.40
Total votes		232,281	100
Republican hold			

=== District 7 ===
Incumbent Republican Bill Archer ran for re-election.

Texas's 7th congressional district, 1984
Party	Candidate	Votes	%
Republican	Bill Archer (incumbent)	213,480	86.67
Democratic	Billy Willibey	32,315	13.33
Total votes		246,315	100
Republican hold			

=== District 8 ===
Incumbent Republican Jack Fields ran for re-election.

Texas's 8th congressional district, 1984
Party	Candidate	Votes	%
Republican	Jack Fields (incumbent)	113,031	64.55
Democratic	Dan Buford	62,072	35.45
Total votes		175,103	100
Republican hold			

=== District 9 ===
Incumbent Democrat Jack Brooks ran for re-election.

Texas's 9th congressional district, 1984
Party	Candidate	Votes	%
Democratic	Jack Brooks (incumbent)	120,559	58.85
Republican	Jim Mahan	84,306	41.15
Total votes		204,865	100
Democratic hold			

=== District 10 ===
Incumbent Democrat J. J. Pickle ran for re-election unopposed.

Texas's 10th congressional district, 1984
Party	Candidate	Votes	%
Democratic	J. J. Pickle (incumbent)	186,447	99.82
Write-in	Others	338	0.18
Total votes		186,785	100
Democratic hold			

=== District 11 ===
Incumbent Democrat Marvin Leath ran for re-election unopposed.

Texas's 11th congressional district, 1984
Party	Candidate	Votes	%
Democratic	Marvin Leath (incumbent)	112,940	100.00
Total votes		112,940	100
Democratic hold			

=== District 12 ===
Incumbent Democrat Jim Wright ran for re-election unopposed.

Texas's 12th congressional district, 1984
Party	Candidate	Votes	%
Democratic	Jim Wright (incumbent)	106,229	100.00
Write-in	Others	3	0.00
Total votes		106,302	100
Democratic hold			

=== District 13 ===
Incumbent Democrat Jack Hightower ran for re-election.

Texas's 13th congressional district, 1984
Party	Candidate	Votes	%
Republican	Beau Boulter	107,600	53.01
Democratic	Jack Hightower (incumbent)	95,367	46.99
Total votes		202,967	100.00
Republican gain from Democratic			

=== District 14 ===
Incumbent Democrat Bill Patman ran for re-election.

Texas's 14th congressional district, 1984
Party	Candidate	Votes	%
Republican	Mac Sweeney	104,181	51.30
Democratic	Bill Patman (incumbent)	98,885	48.70
Total votes		203,066	100.00
Republican gain from Democratic			

=== District 15 ===
Incumbent Democrat Kika de la Garza ran for re-election unopposed.

Texas's 15th congressional district, 1984
Party	Candidate	Votes	%
Democratic	Kika de la Garza (incumbent)	104,863	100.00
Total votes		104,863	100
Democratic hold			

=== District 16 ===
Incumbent Democrat Ronald D. Coleman ran for re-election.

Texas's 16th congressional district, 1984
Party	Candidate	Votes	%
Democratic	Ronald D. Coleman (incumbent)	76,375	57.44
Republican	Jack Hammond	56,589	42.56
Total votes		132,964	100
Democratic hold			

=== District 17 ===
Incumbent Democrat Charles Stenholm ran for re-election unopposed.

Texas's 17th congressional district, 1984
Party	Candidate	Votes	%
Democratic	Charles Stenholm (incumbent)	143,012	100.00
Total votes		143,012	100
Democratic hold			

=== District 18 ===
Incumbent Democrat Mickey Leland ran for re-election.

Texas's 18th congressional district, 1984
Party	Candidate	Votes	%
Democratic	Mickey Leland (incumbent)	109,626	78.81
Republican	Glen Beaman	26,400	18.98
Independent	Jose Alvarado	3,064	2.20
Write-in	Others	20	0.01
Total votes		139,110	100
Democratic hold			

=== District 19 ===
Incumbent Democrat Kent Hance retired to run for U.S. Senator.

Texas's 19th congressional district, 1984
Party	Candidate	Votes	%
Republican	Larry Combest	102,805	58.13
Democratic	Don Richards	74,044	41.87
Total votes		176,849	100.00
Republican gain from Democratic			

=== District 20 ===
Incumbent Democrat Henry B. González ran for re-election unopposed.

Texas's 20th congressional district, 1984
Party	Candidate	Votes	%
Democratic	Henry B. Gonzalez (incumbent)	100,443	100.00
Total votes		100,443	100
Democratic hold			

=== District 21 ===
Incumbent Republican Tom Loeffler ran for re-election.

Texas's 21st congressional district, 1984
Party	Candidate	Votes	%
Republican	Tom Loeffler (incumbent)	199,909	80.61
Democratic	Joe Sullivan	48,039	19.37
Write-in	Others	32	0.01
Total votes		247,980	100
Republican hold			

=== District 22 ===
Incumbent Republican Ron Paul retired to run for U.S. Senator.

Texas's 22nd congressional district, 1984
Party	Candidate	Votes	%
Republican	Tom DeLay	125,225	65.31
Democratic	Doug Williams	66,495	34.68
Total votes		191,751	100
Republican hold			

=== District 23 ===
Incumbent Democrat Abraham Kazen ran for re-election. He lost in the Democratic Primary to Albert Bustamante. Kazen was one of only three incumbent members of congress to lose a primary in 1984.

Texas's 23rd congressional district, 1984
Party	Candidate	Votes	%
Democratic	Albert Bustamante	95,721	100.00
Total votes		95,721	100
Democratic hold			

=== District 24 ===
Incumbent Democrat Martin Frost ran for re-election.

Texas's 24th congressional district, 1984
Party	Candidate	Votes	%
Democratic	Martin Frost (incumbent)	105,210	59.47
Republican	Bob Burk	71,703	40.53
Write-in	Others	5	0.00
Total votes		176,918	100
Democratic hold			

=== District 25 ===
Incumbent Democrat Michael A. Andrews ran for re-election.

Texas's 25th congressional district, 1984
Party	Candidate	Votes	%
Democratic	Michael A. Andrews (incumbent)	113,946	64.04
Republican	Jerry Patterson	63,974	35.96
Total votes		177,920	100
Democratic hold			

=== District 26 ===
Incumbent Democrat Tom Vandergriff ran for re-election. Mid-decade redistricting had made this district slightly more favorable to Democrats. The previous iteration of this district, which Vandergriff narrowly won in 1982, would have given Ronald Reagan 67 percent of the vote had it existed in 1980.

Texas's 26th congressional district, 1984
Party	Candidate	Votes	%
Republican	Dick Armey	126,641	51.25
Democratic	Tom Vandergriff (incumbent)	120,451	48.75
Write-in	Others	2	0.00
Total votes		247,094	100.00
Republican gain from Democratic			

=== District 27 ===
Incumbent Democrat Solomon Ortiz ran for re-election.

Texas's 27th congressional district, 1984
Party	Candidate	Votes	%
Democratic	Solomon Ortiz (incumbent)	105,516	63.64
Republican	Richard Moore	60,283	36.36
Total votes		165,799	100
Democratic hold			
