= Texas's 4th congressional district =

U.S. House district for Texas

Coordinates: 33°18′19″N 95°25′17″W

- Interactive map of district boundaries
- Representative: Pat Fallon; R–Frisco
- Distribution: 51.15% rural; 48.85% urban
- Population (2025): 908,265
- Median household income: $102,367
- Ethnicity: 59.5% White; 14.3% Hispanic; 11.7% Asian; 8.8% Black; 4.6% Two or more races; 0.7% Native American; 0.4% other
- Cook PVI: R+16

Texas's 4th congressional district of the United States House of Representatives is in an area of Northeast Texas, that includes some counties along the Red River northeast of the Dallas/Fort Worth Metroplex, as well as some outer eastern suburbs of the Metroplex. Austin College in Sherman, Texas is located within the district. As of 2017, the 4th district represents 747,188 people who are predominantly white (80.8%) and middle-class (median family income is US$56,062, compared to $50,046 nationwide). It is currently represented by Pat Fallon.

== Current composition ==
For the 118th and successive Congresses (based on redistricting following the 2020 census), the district contains all or portions of the following counties and communities:

Bowie County (2)

Hooks, Leary

Collin County (6)

Celina (part; also 3rd and 26th), Dallas (part; also 3rd, 5th, 6th, 24th, 30th, 32nd, and 33rd; shared with Dallas, Denton, Kaufman, and Rockwall counties), Frisco (part; also 3rd and 26th; shared with Denton County), Hebron (part; also 26th; shared with Denton County), Plano (part; also 3rd, 26th, and 32nd; shared with Denton County), Prosper (part; also 3rd and 26th, shared with Denton County), McKinney (part; also 3rd),

Delta County (2)

Cooper, Pecan Gap (shared with Fannin County)

Denton County (1)

Frisco (part; also 3rd and 26th; shared with Collin County)

Fannin County (13)

All 13 communities

Grayson County (19)

All 19 communities

Hopkins County (4)

All 4 communities

Hunt County (3)

Hawk Cove, Quinlan (part; also 3rd), West Tawakoni

Lamar County (10)

All 10 communities

Rains County (4)

All 4 communities

Red River County (0)

No incorporated or census-recognized communities

Rockwall County (10)

All 10 communities

== Future composition ==
Beginning with the 2026 election, the 4th district will consist of the following counties:

- Bowie (part)
- Collin (part)
- Denton (part)
- Fannin
- Grayson
- Lamar
- Red River

== History ==
Texas has had at least four congressional districts since the State's senators and representatives were re-seated in Congress after the Civil War. The district's current configuration is dated from 1903. It has traditionally given its congressmen very long tenures in Washington; only six men have represented it since then.

Once a reliably Democratic district, the district swung rapidly into the Republican column at the federal level as Dallas' suburbs spilled into the western portion of the district. In fact, it has not supported a Democrat for president since 1964. However, as late as 1996, Bill Clinton carried ten of the sixteen counties that are currently in this district; many of those counties were in the 1st district at the time. Additionally, conservative Democrats continued to hold most of the district's local offices well into the 2000s.

For many years, it was based in Tyler, but a controversial 2003 redistricting orchestrated by then-House Majority Leader Tom DeLay drew it and neighboring Longview out of the 4th district and into neighboring 1st, which made it significantly more Republican. In the process, the 4th district was pushed slightly to the north, picking up Texarkana from the 1st district.

Ralph Hall, the one-time dean of the Texas congressional delegation, represented the district from 1981 to 2015. Originally a Democrat, he became a Republican in 2004. Hall's voting record had been very conservative—even by Texas Democratic standards—which served him well as the district abandoned its Democratic roots. By the turn of the century, he was the only elected Democrat above the county level in much of the district. He had been rumored as a party switcher for some time, and many experts believed he would almost certainly be succeeded by a Republican once he retired.

In 2014, Hall was defeated in the Republican primary by John Ratcliffe, who had served as the former United States Attorney for much of the 4th's territory, and was additionally the former mayor of Heath—a city coincidentally located near Hall's hometown of Rockwall. No Democrat even filed, though by this time, the district had become so heavily Republican that any Democratic candidate would have faced nearly impossible odds in any event. Underlining just how Republican this district was, the Democrats have only managed as much as 30% of the vote once since Hall's party switch.

In January 2015, Ratcliffe took office, and became only the fifth person to hold the seat. He ran unopposed for reelection in 2016, and defeated a nominal Democratic challenger in 2018.

In May 2020, Ratcliffe resigned his seat ahead of his swearing-in to become the 6th Director of National Intelligence.

The district's best-known congressman was Sam Rayburn, the longtime Speaker of the House.

President Dwight D. Eisenhower was born in the fourth district.

After the 2012 redistricting process, a large portion of Collin County had been removed, and replaced with the portion of Cass County that had been in Texas's 1st congressional district, all of Marion County, and a large portion of Upshur County.

== Recent election results from statewide races ==
=== 2023–2027 boundaries ===
Year	Office	Results
2008	President	McCain 66% - 33%
2012	President	Romney 71% - 29%
2014	Senate	Cornyn 75% - 25%
2014	Governor	Abbott 71% - 29%
2016	President	Trump 65% - 30%
2018	Senate	Cruz 63% - 37%
2018	Governor	Abbott 68% - 31%
2018	Lt. Governor	Patrick 63% - 35%
2018	Attorney General	Paxton 62% - 36%
2018	Comptroller of Public Accounts	Hegar 65% - 32%
2020	President	Trump 62% - 36%
2020	Senate	Cornyn 64% - 34%
2022	Governor	Abbott 66% - 33%
2022	Lt. Governor	Patrick 64% - 34%
2022	Attorney General	Paxton 64% - 33%
2022	Comptroller of Public Accounts	Hegar 68% - 31%
2024	President	Trump 65% - 33%
2024	Senate	Cruz 63% - 35%

=== 2027–2033 boundaries ===
Year	Office	Results
2008	President	McCain 65% - 35%
2012	President	Romney 69% - 31%
2014	Senate	Cornyn 74% - 26%
2014	Governor	Abbott 70% - 30%
2016	President	Trump 61% - 34%
2018	Senate	Cruz 59% - 40%
2018	Governor	Abbott 64% - 34%
2018	Lt. Governor	Patrick 59% - 39%
2018	Attorney General	Paxton 59% - 39%
2018	Comptroller of Public Accounts	Hegar 62% - 35%
2020	President	Trump 58% - 40%
2020	Senate	Cornyn 61% - 37%
2022	Governor	Abbott 61% - 37%
2022	Lt. Governor	Patrick 60% - 38%
2022	Attorney General	Paxton 60% - 37%
2022	Comptroller of Public Accounts	Hegar 64% - 34%
2024	President	Trump 61% - 37%
2024	Senate	Cruz 59% - 39%
2026	Senate	Paxton 51% - 47%
2026	Governor	Abbott 55% - 43%

== List of members representing the district ==
Name	Party	Years	Cong– ress	Electoral history
District established March 4, 1863
District inactive		March 4, 1863 – March 31, 1870	37th 38th 39th 40th 41st	Civil War and Reconstruction
Edward Degener (San Antonio)	Republican	March 31, 1870 – March 3, 1871	41st	Elected in 1870. Lost renomination.
John Hancock (Austin)	Democratic	March 4, 1871 – March 3, 1875	42nd 43rd	Elected in 1870. Re-elected in 1872. Redistricted to the 5th district.
Roger Q. Mills (Corsicana)	Democratic	March 4, 1875 – March 3, 1883	44th 45th 46th 47th	Redistricted from the at-large seat and re-elected in 1874. Re-elected in 1876. Re-elected in 1878. Re-elected in 1880. Redistricted to the 9th district.
David B. Culberson (Jefferson)	Democratic	March 4, 1883 – March 3, 1897	48th 49th 50th 51st 52nd 53rd 54th	Redistricted from the 2nd district and re-elected in 1882. Re-elected in 1884. Re-elected in 1886. Re-elected in 1888. Re-elected in 1890. Re-elected in 1892. Re-elected in 1894. Retired.
John W. Cranford (Sulphur Springs)	Democratic	March 4, 1897 – March 3, 1899	55th	Elected in 1896. Retired, then died on the last day of the term.
John Levi Sheppard (Texarkana)	Democratic	March 4, 1899 – October 11, 1902	56th 57th	Elected in 1898. Re-elected in 1900. Died.
Vacant		October 11, 1902 – November 15, 1902	57th	
Morris Sheppard (Texarkana)	Democratic	November 15, 1902 – March 3, 1903	57th	Elected to finish Sheppard's term. Redistricted to the 1st district.
Choice B. Randell (Sherman)	Democratic	March 4, 1903 – March 3, 1913	58th 59th 60th 61st 62nd	Redistricted from the 5th district and re-elected in 1902. Re-elected in 1904. Re-elected in 1906. Re-elected in 1908. Re-elected in 1910. Retired to run for U.S. senator.
Sam Rayburn (Bonham)	Democratic	March 4, 1913 – November 16, 1961	63rd 64th 65th 66th 67th 68th 69th 70th 71st 72nd 73rd 74th 75th 76th 77th 78th 79th 80th 81st 82nd 83rd 84th 85th 86th 87th	Elected in 1912. Re-elected in 1914. Re-elected in 1916. Re-elected in 1918. Re-elected in 1920. Re-elected in 1922. Re-elected in 1924. Re-elected in 1926. Re-elected in 1928. Re-elected in 1930. Re-elected in 1932. Re-elected in 1934. Re-elected in 1936. Re-elected in 1938. Re-elected in 1940. Re-elected in 1942. Re-elected in 1944. Re-elected in 1946. Re-elected in 1948. Re-elected in 1950. Re-elected in 1952. Re-elected in 1954. Re-elected in 1956. Re-elected in 1958. Re-elected in 1960. Died.
Vacant		November 16, 1961 – January 30, 1962	87th	
Ray Roberts (McKinney)	Democratic	January 30, 1962 – January 3, 1981	87th 88th 89th 90th 91st 92nd 93rd 94th 95th 96th	Elected to finish Rayburn's term. Re-elected in 1962. Re-elected in 1964. Re-elected in 1966. Re-elected in 1968. Re-elected in 1970. Re-elected in 1972. Re-elected in 1974. Re-elected in 1976. Re-elected in 1978. Retired.
Ralph Hall (Rockwall)	Democratic	January 3, 1981 – January 5, 2004	97th 98th 99th 100th 101st 102nd 103rd 104th 105th 106th 107th 108th 109th 110th 111th 112th 113th	Elected in 1980. Re-elected in 1982. Re-elected in 1984. Re-elected in 1986. Re-elected in 1988. Re-elected in 1990. Re-elected in 1992. Re-elected in 1994. Re-elected in 1996. Re-elected in 1998. Re-elected in 2000. Re-elected in 2002. Re-elected in 2004. Re-elected in 2006. Re-elected in 2008. Re-elected in 2010. Re-elected in 2012. Lost renomination.
Ralph Hall (Rockwall)	Republican	January 5, 2004 – January 3, 2015	97th 98th 99th 100th 101st 102nd 103rd 104th 105th 106th 107th 108th 109th 110th 111th 112th 113th	Elected in 1980. Re-elected in 1982. Re-elected in 1984. Re-elected in 1986. Re-elected in 1988. Re-elected in 1990. Re-elected in 1992. Re-elected in 1994. Re-elected in 1996. Re-elected in 1998. Re-elected in 2000. Re-elected in 2002. Re-elected in 2004. Re-elected in 2006. Re-elected in 2008. Re-elected in 2010. Re-elected in 2012. Lost renomination.
John Ratcliffe (Heath)	Republican	January 3, 2015 – May 22, 2020	114th 115th 116th	Elected in 2014. Re-elected in 2016. Re-elected in 2018. Resigned to become Director of National Intelligence.
Vacant		May 22, 2020 – January 3, 2021	116th	
Pat Fallon (Frisco)	Republican	January 3, 2021 – present	117th 118th 119th	Elected in 2020. Re-elected in 2022. Re-elected in 2024. Re-elected in 2026.

== Recent elections ==
=== 2004 ===
US House election, 2004: Texas District 4
Party	Candidate	Votes	%
Republican	Ralph Hall (incumbent)	182,866	68.2
Democratic	Jim Nickerson	81,585	30.4
Libertarian	Kevin D. Anderson	3,491	1.3
Total votes		267,942	
Republican hold			

=== 2006 ===
US House election, 2006: Texas District 4
Party	Candidate	Votes	%
Republican	Ralph Hall (incumbent)	106,495	64.43
Democratic	Glenn Melancon	55,278	33.34
Libertarian	Kurt G. Helm	3,496	2.11
Total votes		165,269	
Republican hold			

=== 2008 ===
US House election, 2008: Texas District 4
Party	Candidate	Votes	%
Republican	Ralph Hall (incumbent)	206,906	68.79
Democratic	Glenn Melancon	88,067	29.28
Libertarian	Fred Annett	5,771	1.91
Total votes		300,744	
Republican hold			

=== 2010 ===
US House election, 2010: Texas District 4
Party	Candidate	Votes	%
Republican	Ralph Hall (incumbent)	136,338	73.18
Democratic	VaLinda Hathcox	40,975	21.99
Libertarian	Jim D. Prindle	4,729	2.53
Independent	Shane Shepard	4,224	2.27
Total votes		186,286	
Republican hold			

=== 2012 ===
US House election, 2012: Texas District 4
Party	Candidate	Votes	%
Republican	Ralph Hall (incumbent)	182,679	72.97
Democratic	VaLinda Hathcox	60,214	24.05
Libertarian	Thomas Griffing	7,262	2.90
Write-In	Fred Rostek	188	0.08
Total votes		250,343	
Republican hold			

=== 2014 ===
US House election, 2014: Texas District 4
Party	Candidate	Votes	%
Republican	John Ratcliffe	115,085	100.00
Total votes		115,085	
Republican hold			

=== 2016 ===
US House election, 2016: Texas District 4
Party	Candidate	Votes	%
Republican	John Ratcliffe (incumbent)	216,643	87.99
Libertarian	Cody Wommack	29,577	12.01
Total votes		246,220	
Republican hold			

=== 2018 ===
US House election, 2018: Texas District 4
Party	Candidate	Votes	%
Republican	John Ratcliffe (incumbent)	188,667	75.7
Democratic	Catherine Krantz	57,400	23.0
Libertarian	Ken Ashby	3,178	1.3
Total votes		249,245	100.0
Republican hold			

=== 2020 ===
US House election, 2020: Texas District 4
Party	Candidate	Votes	%
Republican	Pat Fallon	253,837	75.1
Democratic	Russell Foster	76,326	22.6
Libertarian	Lou Antonelli	6,334	1.9
Independent	Tracy Jones (write-in)	1,306	0.4
Total votes		337,803	100.0
Republican hold			

=== 2022 ===
US House election, 2022: Texas District 4
Party	Candidate	Votes	%
Republican	Pat Fallon (incumbent)	170,781	66.7
Democratic	Iro Omere	79,179	30.9
Libertarian	John Simmons	6,049	2.4
Total votes		255,368	100.0
Republican hold			

=== 2024 ===
US House election, 2024: Texas District 4
Party	Candidate	Votes	%
Republican	Pat Fallon (incumbent)	241,603	68.4
Democratic	Simon Cardell	111,696	31.6
Total votes		353,299	100.0
Republican hold			

== Historical district boundaries ==
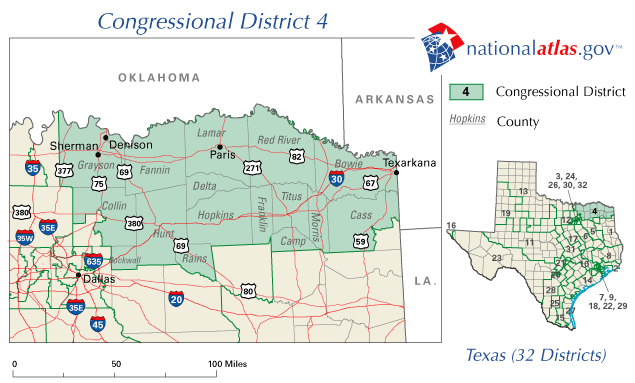
2007–2013

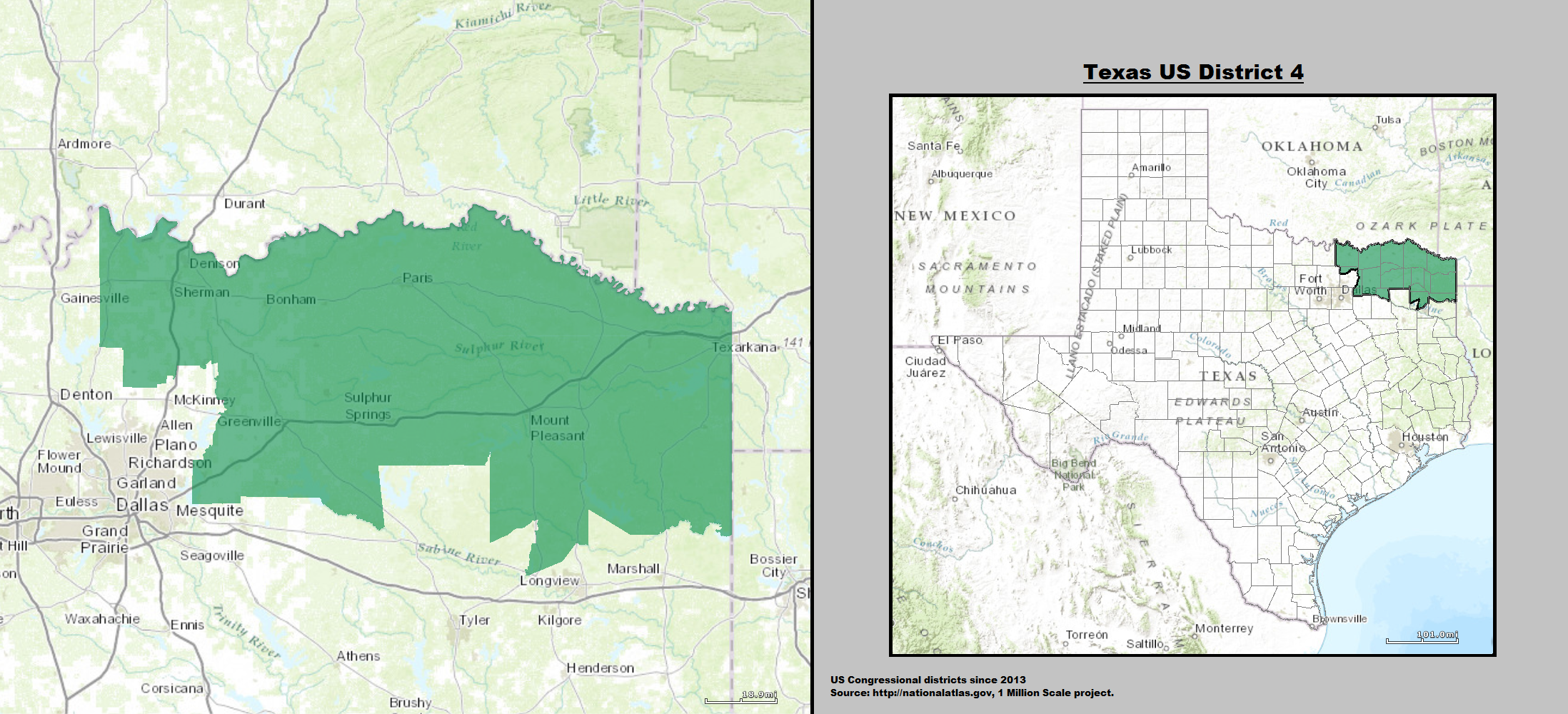
2013–2023

== See also ==
- List of United States congressional districts

U.S. House of Representatives
Preceded by Alabama's 7th congressional district	Home district of the speaker of the House; September 16, 1940 – January 3, 1947	Succeeded by Massachusetts's 14th congressional district
Preceded by Massachusetts's 14th congressional district	Home district of the speaker of the House; January 3, 1949 – January 3, 1953	Succeeded by Massachusetts's 14th congressional district
Preceded by Massachusetts's 14th congressional district	Home district of the speaker of the House; January 3, 1955 – November 16, 1961	Succeeded by Massachusetts's 12th congressional district
