= Texas Six Pack =

Victories of Republicans in Texas

The Texas Six Pack was a group of six freshmen Republican congressmen from Texas who were elected during the 1984 Ronald Reagan landslide victory over Walter Mondale. With their victories the Texas congressional delegation shifted from a 21-6 Democratic advantage to only 17–10.

Four of the six new congressmen would go on to long and powerful careers in Washington. Beau Boulter, Mac Sweeney and Dick Armey upset three incumbent Democratic congressmen. Larry Combest won an open seat being vacated by retiring Democrat, later Republican Kent Hance, while Joe Barton and Tom DeLay won seats vacated by retiring Republicans Phil Gramm and Ron Paul, respectively. For Sweeney, Combest, and Armey it was the first time their districts had ever elected a Republican to congress. In 1988; Boulter relinquished his seat after two terms to wage an unsuccessful race against U.S. Senator Lloyd M. Bentsen, who ran the same year for Vice President of the United States; while Sweeney was defeated in his bid for re-election by Greg Laughlin.

Texas's 6th congressional district, 1984
Party	Candidate	Votes	%
Republican	Joe Barton	131,482	56.60
Democratic	Dan Kubiak	100,799	43.40
Total votes		232,281	100
Republican hold			

Texas's 13th congressional district, 1984
Party	Candidate	Votes	%
Republican	Beau Boulter	107,600	53.01
Democratic	Jack Hightower (incumbent)	95,367	46.99
Total votes		202,967	100.00
Republican gain from Democratic			

Texas's 14th congressional district, 1984
Party	Candidate	Votes	%
Republican	Mac Sweeney	104,181	51.30
Democratic	Bill Patman (incumbent)	98,885	48.70
Total votes		203,066	100.00
Republican gain from Democratic			

Texas's 19th congressional district, 1984
Party	Candidate	Votes	%
Republican	Larry Combest	102,805	58.13
Democratic	Don Richards	74,044	41.87
Total votes		176,849	100.00
Republican gain from Democratic			

Texas's 22nd congressional district, 1984
Party	Candidate	Votes	%
Republican	Tom DeLay	125,225	65.31
Democratic	Doug Williams	66,495	34.68
Total votes		191,751	100
Republican hold			

Texas's 26th congressional district, 1984
Party	Candidate	Votes	%
Republican	Dick Armey	126,641	51.25
Democratic	Tom Vandergriff (incumbent)	120,451	48.75
Write-in	Others	2	0.00
Total votes		247,094	100.00
Republican gain from Democratic			

== Sources ==
- The Almanac of American Politics 1986
- Texas Monthly Dec 8, 1984
