= Heights State Bank Building =

- U.S. National Register of Historic Places
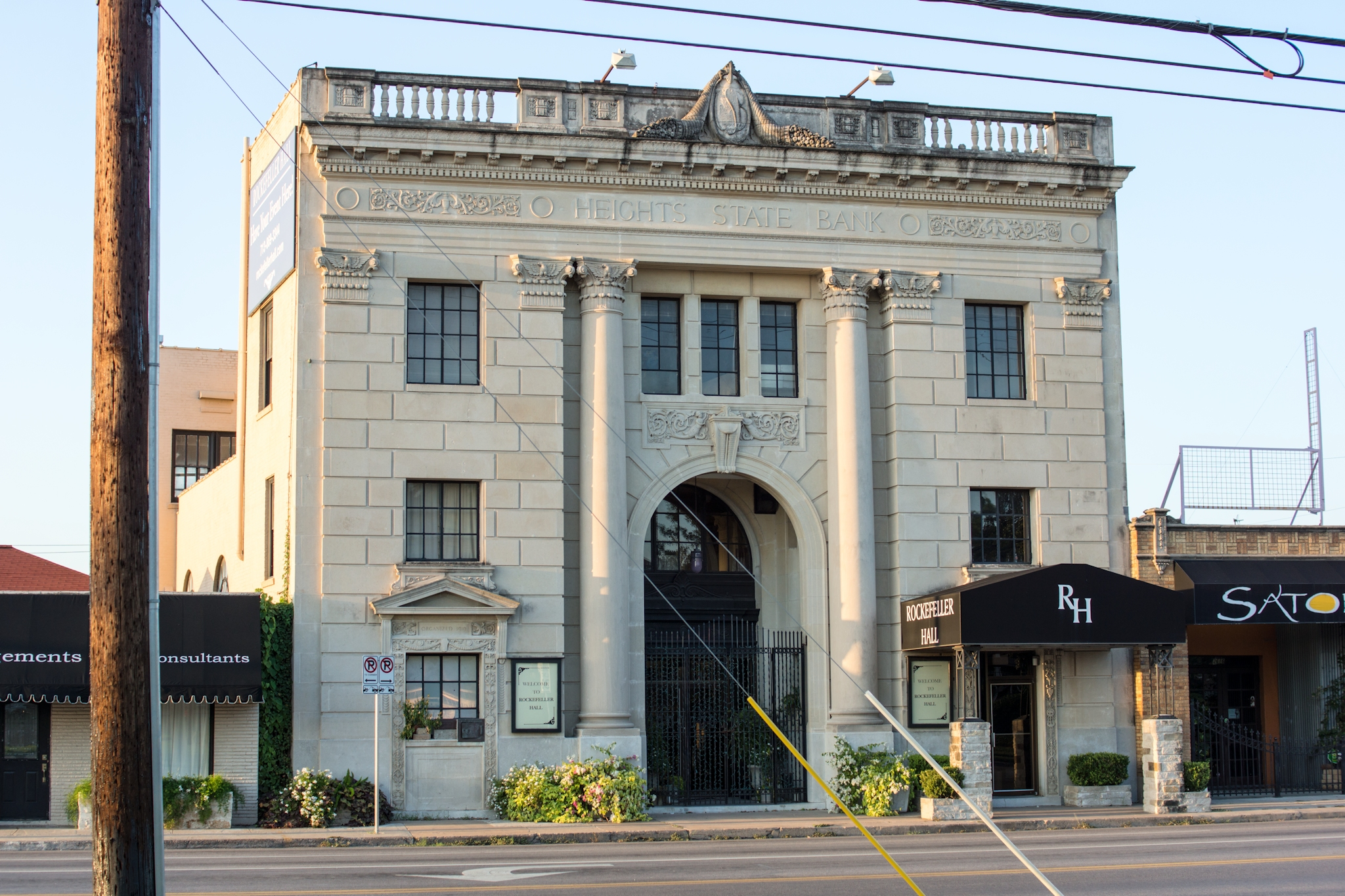
- The building's exterior in 2012

- Location within Texas Location within the United States
- Location: 3620 Washington St., Houston, Texas
- Area: less than one acre
- Built: 1925
- Architectural style: Renaissance, Renaissance Revival
- MPS: Houston Heights MRA
- NRHP reference No.: 83004439
- Added to NRHP: June 22, 1983

The Heights State Bank Building, located at 3620 Washington Street in Houston, Texas, was listed on the National Register of Historic Places on June 22, 1983.

== See also ==
- National Register of Historic Places listings in Harris County, Texas
