= Mac Sweeney =

American politician (1955–2024)

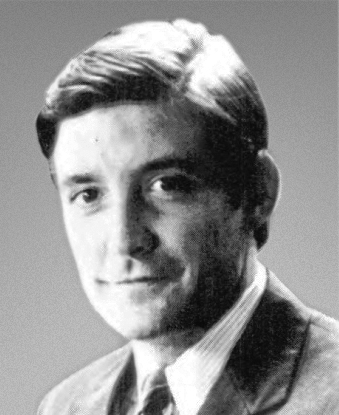

Member of the U.S. House of Representatives from Texas's 14th district
- In office January 3, 1985 – January 3, 1989
- Preceded by: Bill Patman
- Succeeded by: Greg Laughlin

Director of White House Administrative Operations
- In office 1981 – 1983
- President: Ronald Reagan

Personal details
- Born: David McCann Sweeney; September 15, 1955 Wharton, Texas, U.S.
- Died: July 21, 2024 (aged 68) Honolulu, Hawaii, U.S.
- Party: Republican
- Spouse: Catherine Sweeney
- Children: 4
- Education: University of Texas, Austin (BA, JD)
- Occupation: Non-profit executive, investment banker

David McCann "Mac" Sweeney (September 15, 1955 – July 21, 2024) was an American lawyer, businessman, and politician who served as a Republican member of the United States House of Representatives from Texas from 1985 to 1989.

== Early life and education ==
Born in Wharton in Wharton County west of Houston, Sweeney earned his Bachelor of Arts and Juris Doctor from the University of Texas at Austin.

== Career ==
In his early political years Sweeney served on the staffs of Republican Senator John G. Tower from 1977 to 1978, and former Governor John B. Connally, Jr., from 1979 to 1980, when Connally was seeking the 1980 Republican presidential nomination but finished with only one committed delegate.

Sweeney served as the director of administrative operations in the Ronald Reagan White House from 1981 to 1983. In this capacity, he worked directly with John F.W. Rogers and began a long-term association with another well-known Texan, James A. Baker III, then the White House Chief of Staff.

=== Congress ===
In 1984, he unseated Democratic U.S. Representative William Neff "Bill" Patman in one of the nation's closest congressional elections. In doing so, Sweeney became the first-ever Republican to represent District 14.

In his campaign against Patman, Sweeney highlighted his time at the university of Texas Law School and claimed to have been published in the Texas Law Review. These were later proved to be untrue. In June 1986, a Sweeney staffer charged that she had told to work on his campaign or lose her job. Sweeney in reply said- "Most of what we are talking about here is junior staff indiscretions by a young staff." Ex-Congressman Patman said of Sweeney, "He's very flexible. I'd think he'd be a Chinese Communist if it would further his cause."

He was appointed to the House Armed Services Committee and became in 1985 one of six freshmen Republican congressmen from Texas infamously known as the Texas Six Pack, including future House Majority Leaders Dick Armey and Tom DeLay. Sweeney served two terms from 1985 to 1989 but was unseated in 1988 by Democrat Greg Laughlin. The prior, sprawling, 22-county District 14 has been divided, primarily by the 2003 Texas redistricting, into five different congressional districts today.

Sweeney voted against the Abandoned Shipwrecks Act of 1987. The Act asserts United States title to certain abandoned shipwrecks located on or embedded in submerged lands under state jurisdiction, and transfers title to the respective state, thereby empowering states to manage these cultural and historical resources more efficiently, with the goal of preventing treasure hunters and salvagers from damaging them. Despite his vote against it, President Ronald Reagan signed it into law on April 28, 1988.

== Later career ==
After his final unsuccessful campaign, Sweeney entered the private practice of law on Wall Street with the international firm Curtis, Mallet-Prevost, Colt & Mosle before later heading two businesses in New Jersey and Texas involved in successful restructurings or turnarounds.

=== Missionary work ===
In 1997 he began what became a seven-year commitment to humanitarian and missionary work, based out of Cairo but also working in over five different Arab countries. A large number of the 400-plus Christians, Muslims and Copts trained and funded by the Sweeney family continue to work today in Syria, Tunisia, Bahrain, Lebanon and Sudan primarily with schools, clinics, job training, micro-business and tent making enterprises.

In 2004 Sweeney was considered for top positions at the Peace Corps and in helping to organize the first democratic Afghan presidential election, 2004 and the Afghan parliamentary election, 2005; but could not come to terms with the Bush administration.

=== Overseas investments ===
He later operated the Washington-based Paraclete Group which funded large infrastructure projects in developing nations that are typically paired with select in-country charities or international NGO groups. He served on four non-profit or business boards, and he and his wife split their time between Bethesda, Maryland and Houston. He had four children.

== Death ==
On July 21, 2024, Sweeney died at the age of 68 in Honolulu, where he was visiting his son.

== Sources ==
- United States Congress. "Mac Sweeney (id: S001101)". Biographical Directory of the United States Congress.
- Appearances on C-SPAN

U.S. House of Representatives
Preceded by William Neff Patman	Member of the U.S. House of Representatives from Texas's 14th congressional district 1985–1989	Succeeded by Greg Laughlin
