= Bill Archer =

American lawyer and politician (1928–2026)

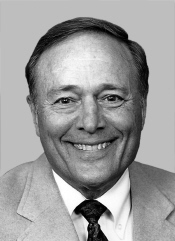

Chair of the House Ways and Means Committee
- In office January 3, 1995 – January 3, 2001
- Preceded by: Sam Gibbons
- Succeeded by: Bill Thomas

Member of the U.S. House of Representatives from Texas's 7th district
- In office January 3, 1971 – January 3, 2001
- Preceded by: George H. W. Bush
- Succeeded by: John Culberson

Member of the Texas House of Representatives from the 22nd district Seat 5
- In office January 10, 1967 – January 12, 1971
- Preceded by: Wallace Miller
- Succeeded by: Seat abolished

Personal details
- Born: William Reynolds Archer Jr. March 22, 1928 Houston, Texas, U.S.
- Died: July 4, 2026 (aged 98) Stanley, Virginia, U.S.
- Party: Democratic (before 1967); Republican (1967–2026)
- Spouse: Sharon Sawyer
- Education: Rice University (attended); University of Texas, Austin (BBA, LLB)

Military service
- Branch: United States Air Force
- Service years: 1951–1953
- Rank: Captain
- Conflict: Korean War
- Archer's voice Archer opening debate on the United States–China Relations Act of 2000. Recorded May 24, 2000

William Reynolds Archer Jr. (March 22, 1928 – July 4, 2026) was an American lawyer and politician. Archer served two terms, from 1967 to 1971, in the Texas House of Representatives – changing from the Democratic to the Republican party in December 1967 – and later represented Texas in the United States House of Representatives as a Republican for 30 years, from 1971 until 2001, serving for his last six years as chair of the powerful House Ways and Means Committee.

== Background ==
Archer was born in Houston, Texas. After graduating from St. Thomas High School, Archer attended Rice University and then transferred to the University of Texas at Austin, where he obtained his BBA and law degrees (LLB). At the University of Texas, he was a member of the Texas Rho chapter of Sigma Alpha Epsilon.

Upon graduating from law school in 1951, Archer was admitted to the State Bar of Texas and started up his practice in Houston, Texas. Within months, Archer was drafted and served as a captain in the United States Air Force after the onset of the Korean War. Returning from service in 1953, Archer became the president of Uncle Johnny Mills, Inc. and stayed there until 1963.

== Politics ==
Meanwhile, Archer started his career as a politician. He served as a councilman and mayor pro tempore for the city of Hunters Creek Village from 1955 to 1962. Five years later, Archer became director of Heights State Bank. During the same year, he became a member of the Texas House of Representatives and served until he was elected the successor for fellow Republican and future president George H. W. Bush as the U.S. Congressman for the 7th District of Texas. Jumping into the race after Bush protégé, James Baker, withdrew, he won his first election with 65% of the vote and was reelected 14 times, never facing serious opposition in what had become one of the most Republican districts in Texas. His 1970 victory turned out to be his lowest percentage; in subsequent years he never dropped below 79% of the vote. He even ran unopposed in 1976, 1990, 1992, and 1994 and faced no major-party opposition in 1998.

Archer served as the chairman of the House Committee on Ways and Means from 1995 until the end of his political career in 2001. As chairman, he was known to be a "tough fiscal conservative". Archer believed that the government had been taking too much from the United States citizens, and as the chairman he sought to downsize Washington by reducing the money it takes away from the people (in reference to taxes), a political strategy referred to as "starving the beast".

Archer was not a candidate for re-election to the 107th United States Congress and subsequently retired from politics on January 2, 2001.

Archer took a politically and socially conservative stance on a variety of issues; among other stances, he supported the death penalty, opposed gay adoption, and called for cuts in welfare funding.

In 1999, Archer was instrumental in giving temporary Most favoured nation (MFN) status to the People's Republic of China, with the support of then-president Bill Clinton, despite deep concerns over human rights issues and the trade deficit. In the last year of his presidency Clinton successfully called on Congress to help him change the PRC's normal trade relations status with the United States to permanent. This amended the Trade Act of 1974 which had the trade status of the PRC on an annual review to determine the best course of action. The piece of legislation was introduced to the House as H.R. number 4444 on May 15, 2000, by Archer (he had three co-sponsors). Introduce to the House the legislation referred to the Ways and Means committee in the House of Representatives to be amended and written up. The legislation was introduced by saying that the bill was a top priority for the rest of the year and it was vital to the U.S. agriculture market to have access to a market that accounts for one-fifth of the world's population.

== Life after politics ==
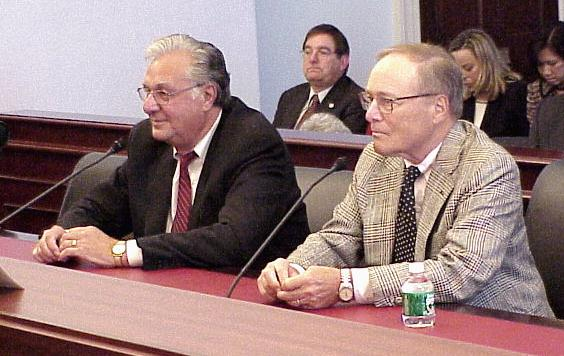
Archer (right) with Dick Armey (left) at a House Budget Committee meeting in October 2004

After retirement from politics in 2001, Archer remained active in public life and maintained a home in Washington. After Paul H. O'Neill resigned as Treasury Secretary in 2002, Archer was considered as a possible successor. He is the eponym of a distinguished fellowship program with the University of Texas System, the Archer Fellowship Program (www.archercenter.org). The highly competitive program brings students from all over the UT System to Washington, D.C. for a full semester of classes and internships in the nation's political center. He was chairman of the International Conservation Caucus Foundation from 2006 to 2009. He acted as Senior Policy Analyst at PricewaterhouseCoopers, and occasional guest lecturer.

Bill Archer died at his farm in Stanley, Virginia, on July 4, 2026, at the age of 98. He will be interred at Arlington National Cemetery.

== See also ==
- List of American politicians who switched parties in office

U.S. House of Representatives
Preceded by George H. W. Bush	Member of the U.S. House of Representatives from Texas's 7th congressional district 1971–2001	Succeeded by John Culberson
Preceded by John Duncan Sr.	Ranking Member of the House Ways and Means Committee; 1988–1995	Succeeded by Sam Gibbons
Preceded by Sam Gibbons	Chair of the House Ways and Means Committee; 1995–2001	Succeeded by Bill Thomas
