= Martin Frost =

American politician (born 1942)

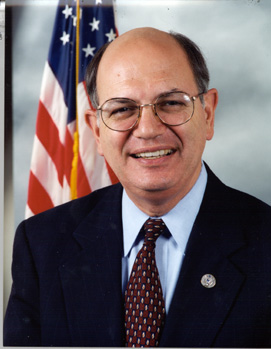

Ranking Member of the House Rules Committee
- In office May 28, 2001 – January 3, 2005
- Preceded by: Joe Moakley
- Succeeded by: Louise Slaughter

Chair of the House Democratic Caucus
- In office January 3, 1999 – January 3, 2003
- Leader: Dick Gephardt
- Preceded by: Vic Fazio
- Succeeded by: Bob Menendez

Chair of the Democratic Congressional Campaign Committee
- In office January 3, 1995 – January 3, 1999
- Leader: Dick Gephardt
- Preceded by: Vic Fazio
- Succeeded by: Patrick J. Kennedy

Member of the U.S. House of Representatives from Texas's 24th district
- In office January 3, 1979 – January 3, 2005
- Preceded by: Dale Milford
- Succeeded by: Kenny Marchant

Personal details
- Born: Jonas Martin Frost III; January 1, 1942 (age 84) Glendale, California, U.S.
- Party: Democratic
- Spouse: Jo Ellen Frost
- Education: University of Missouri (BA, BJ); Georgetown University (JD)

Military service
- Branch/service: United States Army Reserve
- Years of service: 1966–1972
- Frost's voice Frost on emergency elections to Congress after a terrorist attack. Recorded October 2, 2002

Jonas Martin Frost III (born January 1, 1942) is an American politician, who was the Democratic representative to the U.S. House of Representatives for Texas's 24th congressional district from 1979 to 2005.

== Personal life ==
Frost was born to a Jewish family in Glendale, California, the son of Doris (nee Marwil) and Jack Frost. He has one sister, Carol Frost Wagner. His grandfather, Joe Frost, was co-founder of Frost Brothers Department Store. In 1949, his family moved to Fort Worth, Texas where his father took a job with Convair Aircraft. In 1964, he graduated from the University of Missouri with a bachelor of journalism and a Bachelor of Arts in history. As a student, Frost was editor of The Maneater, is a brother of Zeta Beta Tau, and was tapped by Omicron Delta Kappa and QEBH.

After graduating, Frost worked as a newspaper reporter, including positions at The News Journal of Wilmington, Delaware. He received his Juris Doctor degree from the Georgetown University Law Center in 1970. Following his graduation he worked as a law clerk for Federal Judge Sarah T. Hughes of the Northern District of Texas, after which he practiced law in the Dallas–Fort Worth area. In addition, Frost was a legal commentator on KERA-TV.

Frost served in the United States Army Reserve from 1966 to 1972.

== Political career ==
Frost ran unsuccessfully for a seat in the House in 1974. He tried again successfully in 1978, becoming the first Jewish U.S. congressman from Texas. Frost was reelected 12 times without serious opposition. In 1980, he defeated an African American Republican opponent, Clay Smothers.

On October 10, 2002, Martin Frost was among the 81 House Democrats who voted in favor of authorizing the invasion of Iraq.

He served two terms as the chairman of the House Democratic Caucus from 1999 to 2003, the number three post in the Democrats' House leadership after the minority leader and minority whip. As Democratic Caucus Chair, Frost was often at odds with another prominent Dallas-area Congressman, Dick Armey, who was the Republican House Majority Leader.

Due to term limits as Democratic Caucus Chair, Frost made a bid for Minority Leader after Dick Gephardt resigned in the wake of losing four seats in the 2002 Congressional midterm elections, but Frost dropped out of the race and supported eventual winner Nancy Pelosi.

Frost was the ranking member of the House Rules Committee during his last term in the House.

Due to his strong fundraising ability for fellow Democrats, and the fact that he led the 1991 redistricting in Texas, he was one of the targets of a controversial mid-decade redistricting engineered by then-House Majority Leader Tom DeLay. His district, which included portions of Dallas, Fort Worth and Arlington, was redrawn to be much more Republican. Its portions of Fort Worth and Arlington were replaced with wealthier and more Republican territory around Dallas. While Al Gore won the old 24th fairly handily in 2000, the new 24th would have given George W. Bush a staggering 68 percent of the vote in that election. Moreover, Frost's home in Arlington was shifted into the heavily Republican 6th District, represented by 10-term incumbent Joe Barton. Frost decided to seek re-election in the newly redrawn 32nd District, which included a considerable amount of territory that he had represented from 1979 until 1993. He lost by 10 points to Republican Pete Sessions. Since Ralph Hall's party switch earlier in 2004, Frost had been the only white Democrat to represent a significant portion of the Metroplex.

== Retirement ==
In 2005, Frost was a candidate for chairman of the Democratic National Committee. He dropped out of the race on February 1. On February 15, Frost was hired by Fox News as a political commentator.

Frost is now an attorney at the Polsinelli law firm and president of America Votes. He is also a member of the ReFormers Caucus of Issue One.

In a July 2011 op-ed regarding the debt ceiling crisis, Frost wrote, "We now have a group of U.S. politicians seeking political purity, who seem to have much in common with the Taliban. They are tea party members."

Frost co-authored with Tom Davis, Richard E. Cohen, and David Eisenhower the 2014 book The Partisan Divide in which they attempt to explain the reasons behind an increasingly polarized U.S. Congress and offer possible solutions.

After leaving office, he became involved in political reform efforts, including joining nine other former members of Congress to co-author a 2021 opinion editorial advocating reforms of Congress.

== Personal ==
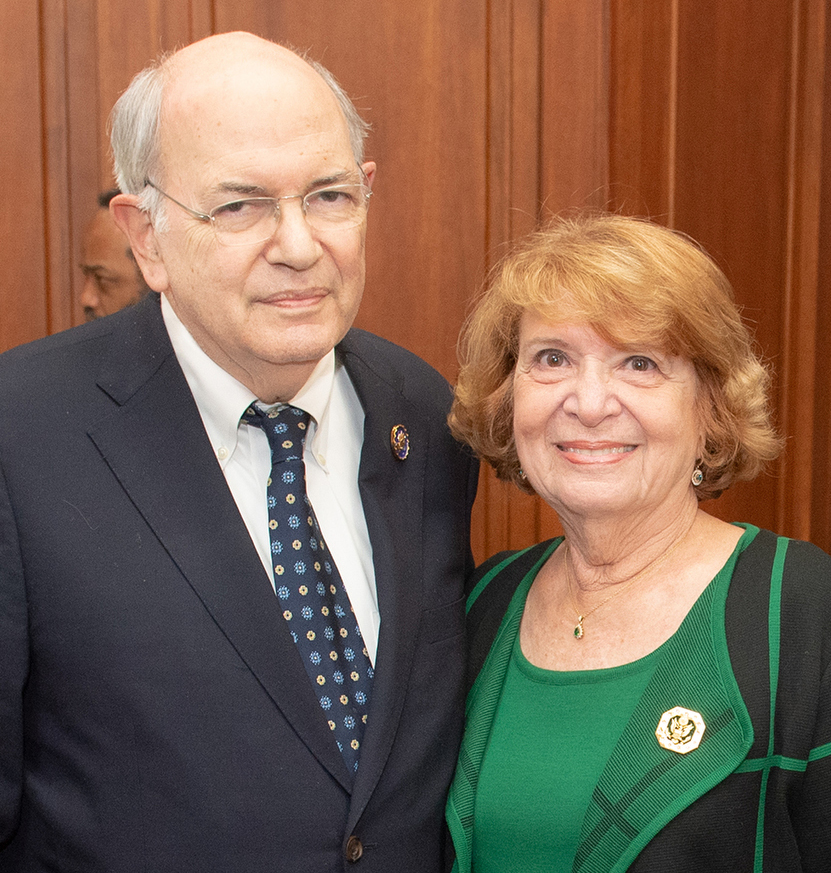
Frost in 2020 with his wife Jo Ellen Frost

In 1976, Frost married Valerie H. Hall in Dallas. They divorced in 1998. Later that year he married Kathryn Frost, a major general in the United States Army. She died in 2006, and in 2008, Frost married Jo Ellen Ronson.

== See also ==
- List of Jewish members of the United States Congress

== Notes ==
U.S. House of Representatives
Preceded by Dale Milford	Member of the U.S. House of Representatives from Texas's 24th congressional district 1979–2005	Succeeded by Kenny Marchant
Preceded by Joe Moakley	Ranking Member of the House Rules Committee; 2001–2005	Succeeded by Louise Slaughter
Party political offices
Preceded by Vic Fazio	Chair of the House Democratic Caucus; 1999–2003	Succeeded by Bob Menendez
Preceded by Vic Fazio	Chair of the Democratic Congressional Campaign Committee; 1995–1999	Succeeded by Patrick J. Kennedy
U.S. order of precedence (ceremonial)
Preceded by Luis Gutierrez as Former U.S. Representative	Order of precedence of the United States as Former U.S. Representative	Succeeded by Gene Green as Former U.S. Representative
