= Greg Laughlin =

American politician (born 1942)

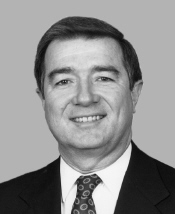

Member of the U.S. House of Representatives from Texas's 14th district
- In office January 3, 1989 – January 3, 1997
- Preceded by: Mac Sweeney
- Succeeded by: Ron Paul

Personal details
- Born: Gregory Haines Laughlin; January 21, 1942 (age 84) Bay City, Texas, U.S.
- Party: Democratic (before 1995); Republican (1995–present)
- Education: Texas A&M University (BA); University of Texas, Austin (JD)

Military service
- Branch/service: United States Army; United States Army Reserve
- Years of service: 1964–1968 (reserve); 1968–1970 (active); 1970–1988 (reserve); 1991 (active)
- Rank: Colonel
- Battles/wars: Gulf War

Gregory Haines Laughlin (born January 21, 1942) is an American politician from Texas. He is a former member of the United States House of Representatives.

== Early life and education ==
Laughlin was born in Bay City, Texas, and was raised in West Columbia, Texas, where he still maintains a residence, and he graduated from Texas A&M University. Laughlin served in the United States Army from 1968 to 1970 and later was a reservist. Before the election to Congress in 1988, he practiced law in Texas. He served as assistant district attorney in Houston for four years before returning to private practice.

== Election and tenure ==
A conservative Democrat, Laughlin ran for the United States House of Representatives in 1986, narrowly losing to freshman Republican Mac Sweeney, who had served as an aide in the Ronald W. Reagan White House. Laughlin sought a rematch in 1988, and this time he won. Laughlin survived a bitter re-election campaign during the next cycle despite old allegations involving favoritism to a firm.

Laughlin was the only member of Congress to see active duty during Operation Desert Storm, as a colonel in the U.S. Army Reserves in 1991.

In 1995, the Republican Party, which had gained a majority in the House for the first time in four decades, offered Laughlin a seat on the Ways and Means Committee if he joined the GOP. Laughlin did so on June 26, 1995. He claimed that, as a Democrat, he had to make some hard votes.

In the subsequent congressional election in 1996, Laughlin was endorsed by many Republican Party leaders, including then-Governor George W. Bush, Speaker of the House Newt Gingrich, and other members of the party from outside the district and the state. Despite this, Laughlin faced a primary challenge from former Texas Republican Congressman Ron Paul, the Libertarian Party presidential candidate in 1988, and Jim Deats, Laughlin's Republican opponent from 1994 (when Laughlin was still a Democrat). In the three-way race, Laughlin won the initial primary election with 42 percent of the vote, but by failing to win a majority he was required to face the second-place Paul in a run-off election. Paul defeated Laughlin by a 56–44 percent margin in the runoff election and went on to win the congressional seat. Paul, who unsuccessfully sought the Republican presidential nomination in 2008 and 2012, held the seat until he retired in 2013.

== After Congress ==
Laughlin remained in Washington, D.C., practicing law at the office of Patton Boggs, in the areas of public policy, energy, international trade, and tax law. He has since moved to the firm of Pillsbury Winthrop Shaw Pittman. Laughlin was contracted to work with the controversial Israeli spyware firm NSO Group, according to documents filed with the FARA Registration Unit of the Department of Justice. The firm's software was implicated in the murder of Washington Post columnist Jamal Khashoggi. The software was also deployed on world leaders, journalists, dissidents and human rights activists.

At the behest of Paul Biya, Laughlin formed a bipartisan group of former members of Congress to monitor the 2004 presidential elections in Cameroon. According to the BBC, he stated "we have never seen such a transparent way to show who got the vote". This was in contrast to the observations of a delegation from the Commonwealth of Nations led by former Prime Minister of Canada Joe Clark and Episcopal Conference of Cameroon.

== See also ==
- List of American politicians who switched parties in office
- List of United States representatives who switched parties

U.S. House of Representatives
Preceded by Mac Sweeney	Member of the U.S. House of Representatives from Texas's 14th congressional district 1989–1997	Succeeded by Ron Paul
U.S. order of precedence (ceremonial)
Preceded by Pete Geren as Former U.S. Representative	Order of precedence of the United States as Former U.S. Representative	Succeeded by Ken Bentsen Jr. as Former U.S. Representative
