= Marvin Leath =

American politician

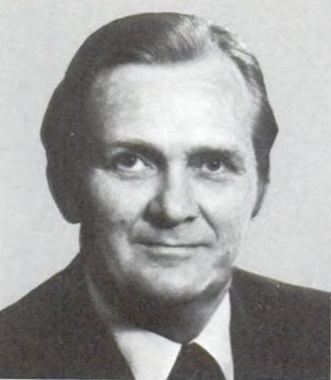

Member of the U.S. House of Representatives from Texas's 11th district
- In office January 3, 1979 – January 3, 1991
- Preceded by: William R. Poage
- Succeeded by: Chet Edwards

Personal details
- Born: James Marvin Leath; May 6, 1931 Henderson, Texas, U.S.
- Died: December 8, 2000 (aged 69) Arlington, Virginia, U.S.
- Party: Democratic

James Marvin Leath (May 6, 1931 – December 8, 2000) was a U.S. representative from Texas.

Born in Henderson, Texas, Leath attended the Rusk County public schools and graduated from Henderson High School in 1949. He attended Kilgore Junior College. B.B.A., University of Texas, Austin, 1954. He served in the United States Army from 1954 to 1956 achieving the rank of first lieutenant. He coached football and track at Henderson High School from 1957 to 1959. Business salesman, 1959. Banking, 1962. Officer and director in five Texas banks, and two manufacturing companies. He served as special assistant to United States Representative William R. Poage from 1972 to 1974.

Leath was elected as a Democrat to the Ninety-sixth and to the five succeeding Congresses (January 3, 1979 – January 3, 1991). Leath was known as one of the founders of the "Boll Weevils," a group of conservative Southern Democrats who allied with Republican President Ronald Reagan on budgetary and fiscal issues. He was not a candidate for renomination in 1990 to the One Hundred Second Congress. He died on December 8, 2000, in Arlington, Virginia.

== Sources ==
- United States Congress. "Marvin Leath (id: L000180)". Biographical Directory of the United States Congress.

U.S. House of Representatives
Preceded by William R. Poage	Member of the U.S. House of Representatives from Texas's 11th congressional district 1979–1991	Succeeded by Chet Edwards
