= Steve Bartlett =

American politician (born 1947)

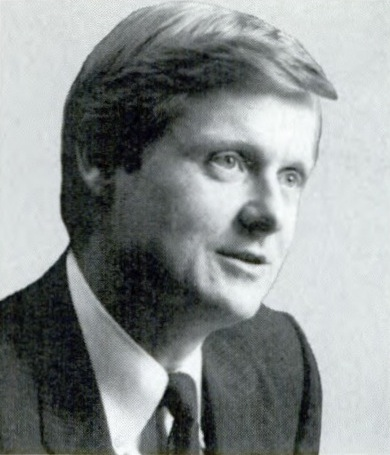

55th Mayor of Dallas
- In office December 2, 1991 – June 5, 1995
- Preceded by: Annette Strauss
- Succeeded by: Ron Kirk

Member of the U.S. House of Representatives from Texas's 3rd district
- In office January 3, 1983 – March 11, 1991
- Preceded by: James M. Collins
- Succeeded by: Sam Johnson

Personal details
- Born: Harry Steven Bartlett; September 19, 1947 (age 79) Los Angeles, California, U.S.
- Party: Republican
- Spouse: Gail Coke
- Children: 3
- Education: University of Texas, Austin (BA)

Harry Stephen Bartlett (born September 19, 1947) is an American politician and former president and CEO of the Financial Services Roundtable, an advocacy group lobbying the U.S. federal government on financial services legislation, a position which he held from 1999 to 2012. He served as the U.S. representative for Texas's 3rd congressional district, as the 55th mayor of Dallas, Texas, and as a member of the Dallas City Council.

== United States Representative ==
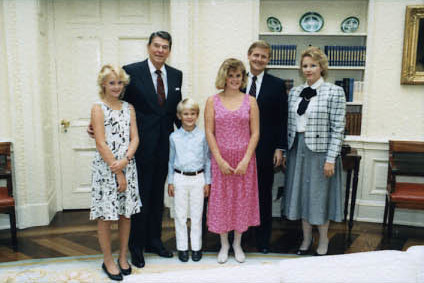
Bartlett and his family with President Ronald Reagan in 1986

Bartlett served as a U.S. Representative from 1983 until his resignation in 1991. He won the open seat over former state Representative Kay Bailey Hutchison, later the state treasurer, U.S. Senator, and an unsuccessful gubernatorial candidate in 2010. The position became vacant when the long-term Republican incumbent, James M. Collins ran unsuccessfully for the U.S. Senate against the Democrat Lloyd M. Bentsen, Jr., of Houston.

While in Congress, Bartlett served as a member of the House Banking Committee, where he "led the successful push to let the market set interest rates on government-insured mortgages." He served as Deputy Whip and was a sponsor or principal cosponsor of nearly 20 major pieces of legislation, including the Enhanced Secondary Mortgage Market Act, Fair Labor Standards Act Reforms, FHA Deregulation and the Americans with Disabilities Act.

== Mayoralty ==
Bartlett left the House to run for mayor of Dallas. On November 5, 1991, he was elected to the nonpartisan position with 54 percent of the vote. He was sworn in on December 2, 1991. As mayor, Bartlett led an effort to reduce violent crime and adopted a $5 billion capital improvements plan. He worked to improve an economic revitalization, a downtown renaissance, and 30,000 new residential units in or adjacent to downtown Dallas. Bartlett served as the city's Mayor until 1995.

== Private sector and lobbying ==
Bartlett was hired to head the Financial Services Roundtable in 1999. In 2012, he was replaced as president and CEO by former Republican presidential candidate and the former Governor Tim Pawlenty of Minnesota.

Following his government service, Bartlett served on a number of boards of directors, including IMCO Recycling, Kaufman and Broad Home Corporation, Sun Coast Industrial and the YMCA of Metropolitan Washington. He is the Chairman of the Board of Directors of RespectAbility. In addition, he also served on the board of governors of the National YMCA, the Fannie Mae National Advisory Council and the board of the Dallas/Fort Worth International Airport. In 2001 he served on the President's Commission on Excellence in Special Education.

Bartlett has been recognized for his leadership skills by the National Association of Manufacturers, National Federation of Independent Business; Ebony, Essence, and Jet magazines; Texas Association for Retarded Citizens; Anti-Defamation League; National Council of La Raza; American Electronics Association; Watchdogs of the Treasury; and Best Dad by the NF Foundation.

In 2011, Bartlett earned about $2 million a year at Financial Services Roundtable.

== Other activities ==
Bartlett has served as an adjunct professor at the University of Texas Lyndon B. Johnson School of Public Affairs and as a member of the Leadership Group on U.S.-Muslim Engagement.

== 2020 presidential election ==
On August 24, 2020, Bartlett was one of 24 former Republican lawmakers to endorse Democratic nominee Joe Biden on the opening day of the Republican National Convention.

In the aftermath of the January 6th insurrection, he, along with 30 other Republican former members of Congress called on their former colleagues to pass articles of impeachment against outgoing President Donald Trump.

Continuing this trend, Bartlett endorsed Democrat James Talarico in the 2026 United States Senate election in Texas.

== Personal life ==
Bartlett was born in Los Angeles, California and reared in Lockhart in Caldwell County, Texas. He attended Kimball High School in Dallas, at which he met his future wife at a Young Republicans bake sale; he graduated in 1966. Barlett attended the University of Texas at Austin, from which he received a Bachelor of Arts in 1971. He also became a member of Sigma Phi Epsilon.

Bartlett is married to the former Gail Coke; the Bartletts have three children and six grandchildren. They reside in McLean, Virginia.

U.S. House of Representatives
Preceded by James M. Collins	Member of the U.S. House of Representatives from Texas's 3rd congressional district 1983–1991	Succeeded by Sam Johnson
Political offices
Preceded by Annette Strauss	Mayor of Dallas; 1991–1995	Succeeded by Ron Kirk
U.S. order of precedence (ceremonial)
Preceded by Tom Loeffler as Former U.S. Representative	Order of precedence of the United States as Former U.S. Representative	Succeeded by Pete Geren as Former U.S. Representative
