= Michael A. Andrews =

American attorney and politician

Mike Andrews
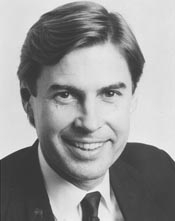

Member of the U.S. House of Representatives from Texas's 25th district
- In office January 3, 1983 – January 3, 1995
- Preceded by: Constituency established
- Succeeded by: Ken Bentsen

Personal details
- Born: Michael Allen Andrews; February 7, 1944 (age 82) Houston, Texas, U.S.
- Party: Democratic
- Education: University of Texas, Austin (BA); Southern Methodist University (JD)

Michael Allen Andrews (born February 7, 1944) is an American attorney and politician who served as a member of the United States House of Representatives from Texas. He was elected as a Democrat to the 98th United States Congress and the five succeeding Congresses, serving from January 3, 1983, until January 3, 1995.

== Early life and education ==
Born in Houston, Andrews graduated from Arlington Heights High School in Fort Worth, Texas in 1962. In 1967, he earned a Bachelor of Arts degree from the University of Texas at Austin. In 1970, he earned a Juris Doctor from the Dedman School of Law.

== Career ==
He was admitted to the Texas bar in 1971, and he worked as a lawyer in private practice. From 1971 to 1972, he was a law clerk for the United States district court judge for the Southern District of Texas. From 1972 to 1976, he was the assistant district attorney for Harris County, Texas. He continued private practice of law, from 1976 until 1983.

=== Congress ===
Andrews first ran for Congress in 1980 in Texas's 22nd congressional district, narrowly losing to Republican incumbent Ron Paul. In 1982, Andrews ran for the neighboring 25th district, which had been carved out of most of the more Democratic portions of the old 22nd. He won there easily and was reelected five more times. He even ran unopposed in 1986 and 1990.

He was not a candidate for renomination in 1994, choosing instead to run for the Democratic nomination in the 1994 United States Senate election.

=== Later career ===
He is senior counsel for the Washington, D.C. branch of King & Spalding.

U.S. House of Representatives
New constituency	Member of the U.S. House of Representatives from Texas's 25th congressional district 1983–1995	Succeeded by Ken Bentsen Jr.
U.S. order of precedence (ceremonial)
Preceded by Ted Deutch as Former U.S. Representative	Order of precedence of the United States as Former U.S. Representative	Succeeded by Jim Chapman as Former U.S. Representative
