= J. J. Pickle =

American politician, Democratic congressman from Texas (1913–2005)

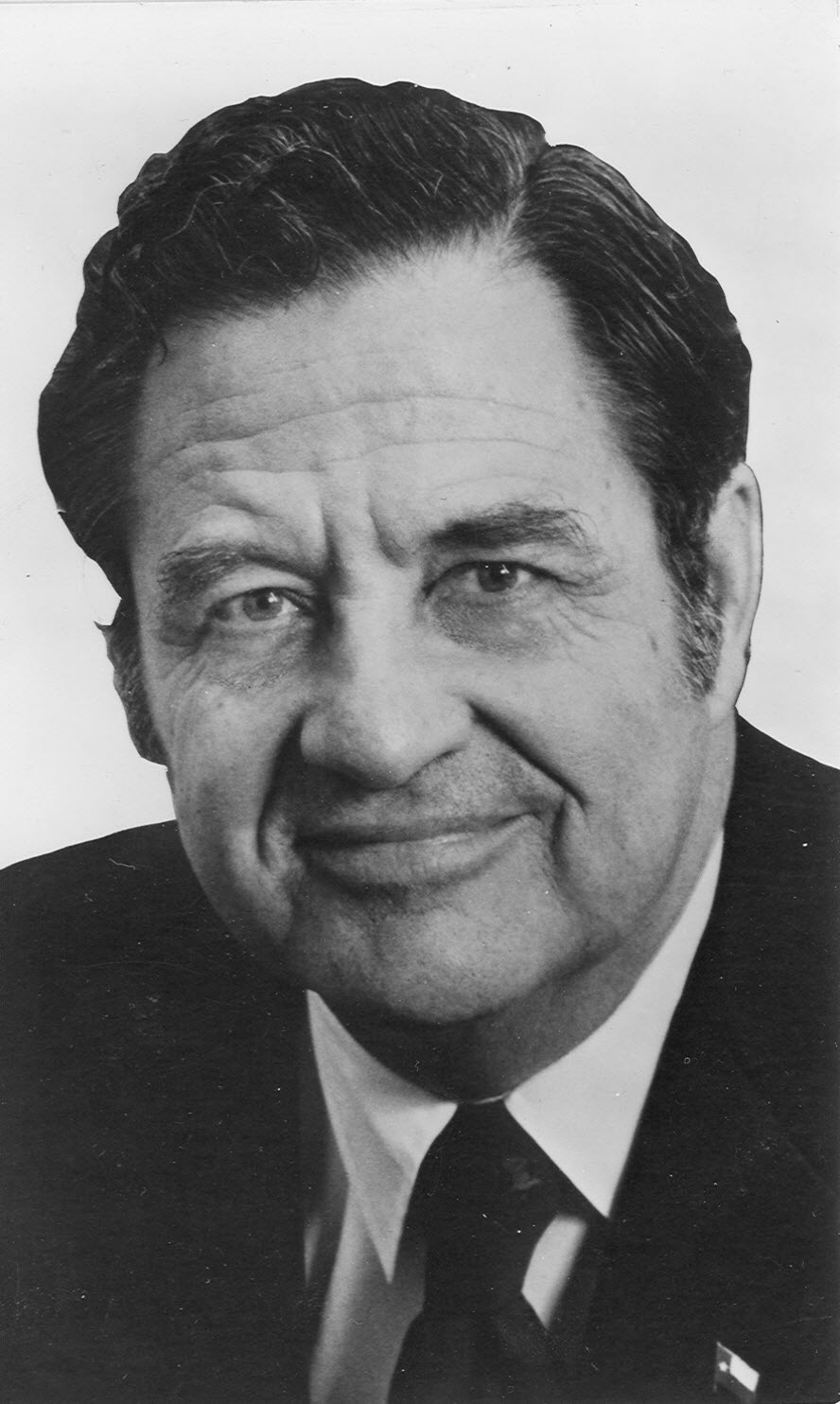

Member of the U.S. House of Representatives from Texas's 10th district
- In office December 21, 1963 – January 3, 1995
- Preceded by: Homer Thornberry
- Succeeded by: Lloyd Doggett

Personal details
- Born: James Jarrell Pickle; October 11, 1913 Roscoe, Texas, U.S.
- Died: June 18, 2005 (aged 91) Austin, Texas, U.S.
- Party: Democratic
- Spouse(s): Ella Nora Critz; Beryl Bolton McCarroll
- Children: Peggy Pickle

Military service
- Allegiance: United States
- Branch/service: United States Navy
- Years of service: 1941–1945
- Rank: Lieutenant
- Unit: USS St. Louis; USS Miami
- Battles/wars: World War II; Pacific War

James Jarrell "Jake" Pickle (October 11, 1913 – June 18, 2005) was a United States representative from the 10th congressional district of Texas from 1963 to 1995.

== Early life ==
Pickle was born in Roscoe, Texas, and brought up in Big Spring. He acquired his nickname Jake from a mischievous character he portrayed in a family play when he was four years old. Pickle was an Eagle Scout and recipient of the Distinguished Eagle Scout Award from the Boy Scouts of America.

Pickle attended the public schools in Big Spring and received his Bachelor of Arts from the University of Texas at Austin where he was a member of the 1934 Southwest Conference championship swimming team and the student body president as a senior in 1937. He was also a member of the Friar Society.

== Career ==
Pickle was introduced by future governor John Connally to then-Representative Lyndon B. Johnson, who served as his political mentor. He worked on Johnson's 1940 re-election campaign and assisted Lady Bird Johnson in running the Congressional office. When the United States entered World War II, Pickle joined the U.S. Navy as a gunnery officer and was stationed on the cruisers USS St. Louis and USS Miami, surviving three torpedo attacks. When the war ended, he, Johnson, and Connally helped found a radio station (KVET) in Austin, Texas. After 10 years in the advertising business, he joined the Democratic Election Executive Committee of Texas in 1957.

Pickle was elected as a Democrat to the 88th Congress, by special election, to fill the vacancy caused by the resignation of U.S. Representative Homer Thornberry, who became a U.S. District judge. He represented the Austin-based district that Johnson had represented from 1937 to 1949. Pickle was reelected 15 times before retiring at the conclusion of the 103rd Congress. His campaign trademark was a "squeaky pickle" rubber toy he handed out to those he met in area parades.

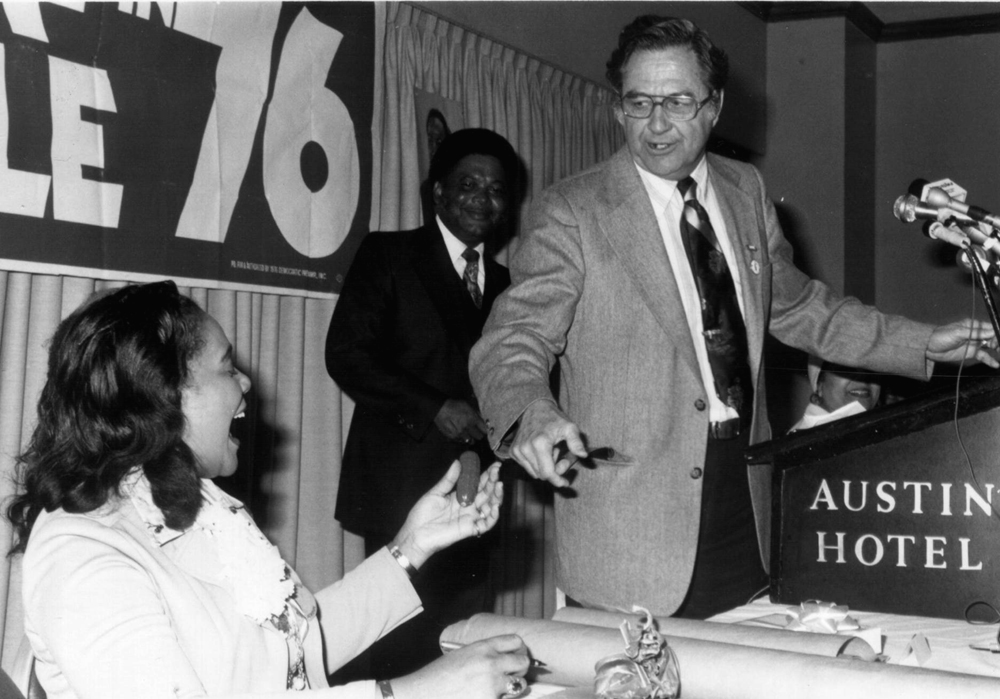
Jake Pickle hands Coretta Scott King a "squeaky pickle" at a campaign rally in Austin, 1976.

While in the House, Pickle rose through the ranks to become the third ranking Democrat on the House Ways and Means Committee. Pickle voted in favor of the Civil Rights Acts of 1964 and 1968, and the Voting Rights Act of 1965. He was one of only eight Southern Representatives to vote for the Civil Rights Act of 1964. Pickle went on to play a key role in passing major Social Security reform legislation in 1983 to save the system from insolvency. The reforms increased the payroll tax rate, slowly increased the full benefit retirement age to 67 and taxed some of the benefits. He considered this legislation his greatest accomplishment.

Pickle was able to steer research money to the University of Texas, and today the university's J. J. Pickle Research Campus is named in his honor. He was influential in the city of Austin, Texas, as well, most notably for relocating Austin's main airport from Robert Mueller Municipal Airport to Austin-Bergstrom International Airport. He was also instrumental in bringing the SEMATECH and MCC consortiums to Austin.

In 2007, the Texas Legislature unanimously approved a resolution designating the SH 130 Toll Road, which runs from Georgetown to Seguin, as "Pickle Parkway" to honor the late congressman.

Although Pickle once described himself as “by nature rather conservative,” his voting record in Congress was largely a liberal one.

== Personal life ==
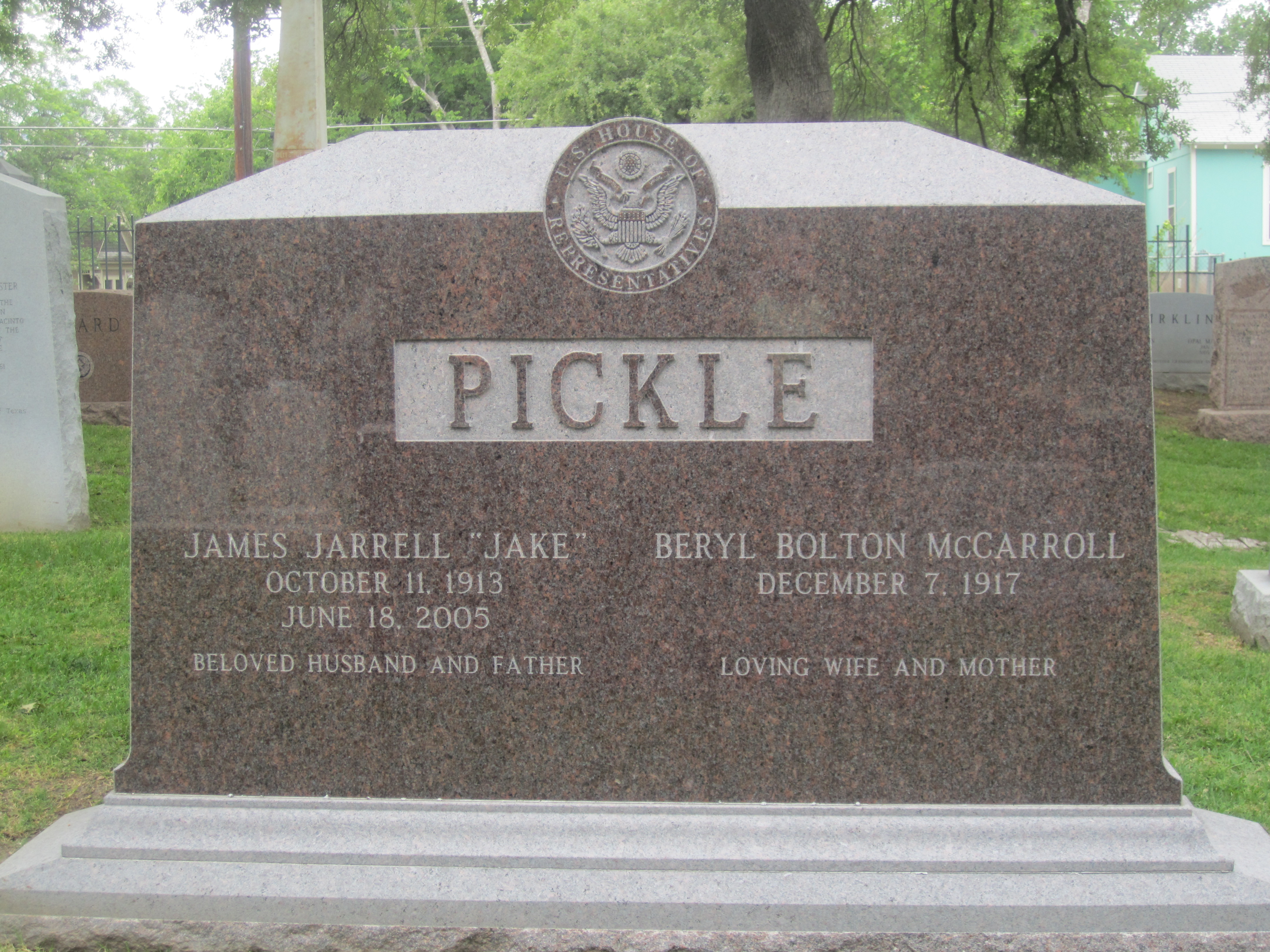
Pickle's grave at Texas State Cemetery in Austin, Texas

Before Pickle left for World War II in 1942, he married Ella Nora "Sugar" Critz. They had one daughter together. Critz died in 1952, and Pickle married Beryl Bolton McCarroll in 1960.

Pickle was diagnosed with prostate cancer in 1991 and lymphoma in 2001. He died at his home in Austin on June 18, 2005, of complications from his cancer and is interred at the Texas State Cemetery there.

Peggy Pickle was Jake Pickle's only daughter. She still makes contributions to the University of Texas at Austin on her father's behalf. In 1997, Jake and Peggy Pickle wrote a book together called Jake with a foreword by former Texas governor Ann Richards.

== Bibliography ==
- Lindell, Chuck (June 19, 2005), "The People's Politician", Austin American-Statesman, pp. A1, A9A-A9B, archived from the original on June 21, 2005

U.S. House of Representatives
Preceded by Homer Thornberry (D)	Member of the U.S. House of Representatives from Texas's 10th congressional district 1963–1995	Succeeded by Lloyd Doggett (D)
