= Ron Coleman (politician) =

American politician (born 1941)

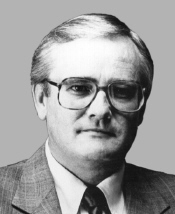

Member of the U.S. House of Representatives from Texas's 16th district
- In office January 3, 1983 – January 3, 1997
- Preceded by: Richard White
- Succeeded by: Silvestre Reyes

Member of the Texas House of Representatives
- In office January 9, 1973 – January 11, 1983
- Preceded by: Constituency established
- Succeeded by: Constituency abolished
- Constituency: 72nd district, Seat 3 (1973–1977); 72nd district, Seat B (1977–1983)

Personal details
- Born: Ronald D'Emory Coleman; November 29, 1941 (age 84) El Paso, Texas, U.S.
- Party: Democratic
- Education: University of Texas, El Paso (BA); University of Texas, Austin (JD)

Ronald D'Emory Coleman (born November 29, 1941) is an American politician and former Democratic member of the United States House of Representatives from Texas.

== Early life and career ==
Born in El Paso, Texas, Coleman attended public schools, earned a B.A. from the University of Texas at El Paso in 1963, and a J.D. from the University of Texas School of Law in 1967.

He served in the United States Army from 1967 to 1969, attaining the rank of captain. He was a public school teacher in El Paso and a legislative aid in both houses of the Texas Legislature. He was admitted to the bar and was an assistant county attorney in El Paso County from 1969 to 1973. He attended the University of Kent in 1981.

== Political career ==
Coleman was elected to the Texas House of Representatives in 1972, and was reelected four additional times. He was a delegate to the Texas constitutional convention in 1974.

=== Congress ===
He was elected as a to the 98th United States Congress and to the six succeeding Congresses. serving from 1983 to 1997. He was not a candidate for re-election to the 105th United States Congress. In 1992, it was revealed that Coleman had over 670 overdrafts as part of the House banking scandal but was still able to win re-election. In Congress he was a member of the House Appropriations Committee, the House Armed Services Committee, and the Select Committee on Intelligence.

U.S. House of Representatives
Preceded by Richard White	Member of the U.S. House of Representatives from Texas's 16th congressional district 1983–1997	Succeeded by Silvestre Reyes
U.S. order of precedence (ceremonial)
Preceded by John Bryant as Former U.S. Representative	Order of precedence of the United States as Former U.S. Representative	Succeeded by Henry Bonilla as Former U.S. Representative
