= Larry Combest =

American politician (born 1945)

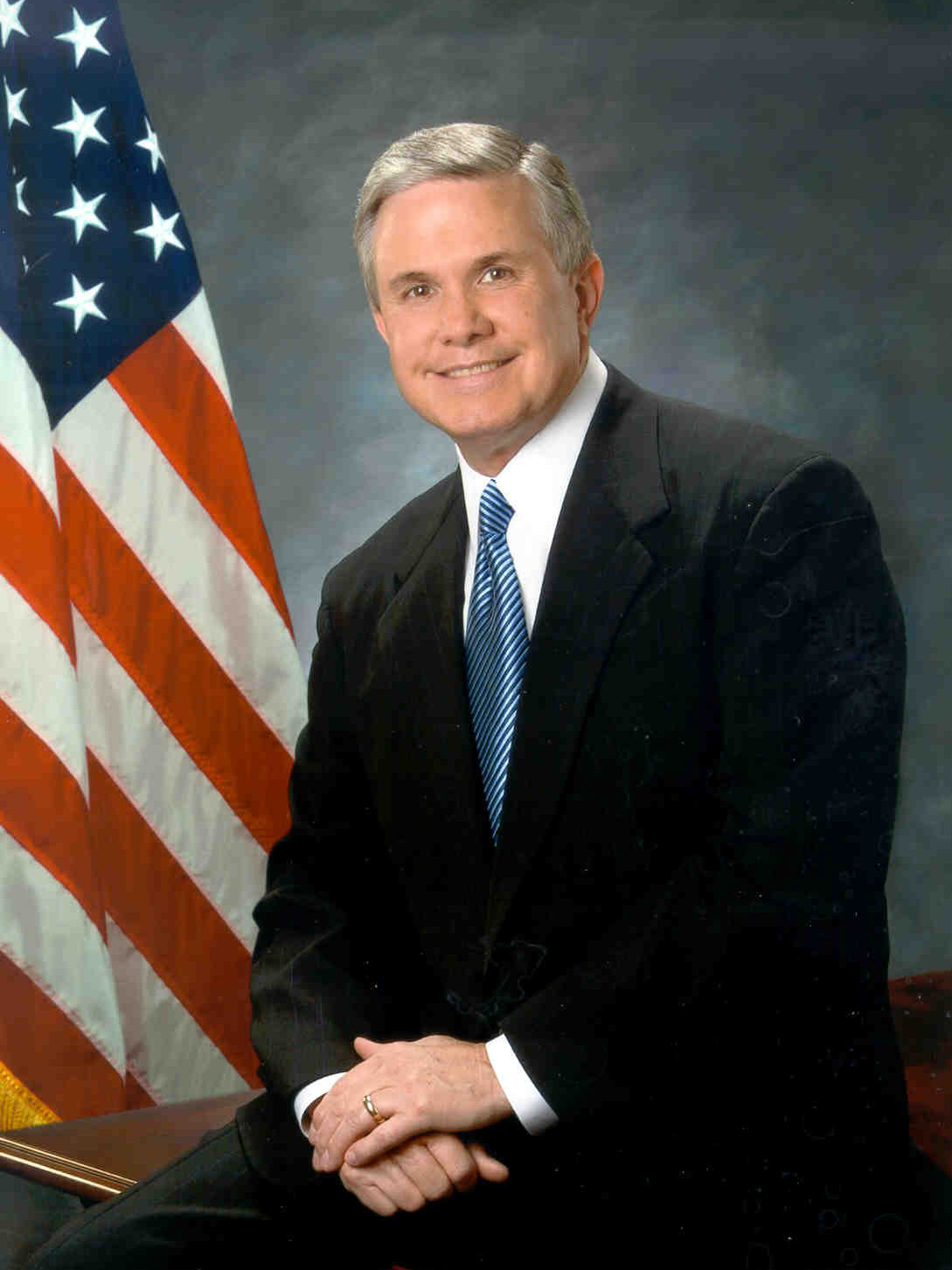

Chair of the House Agriculture Committee
- In office January 3, 1999 – May 31, 2003
- Preceded by: Bob Smith
- Succeeded by: Bob Goodlatte

Chair of the House Intelligence Committee
- In office January 3, 1995 – January 3, 1997
- Preceded by: Dan Glickman
- Succeeded by: Porter Goss

Member of the U.S. House of Representatives from Texas's 19th district
- In office January 3, 1985 – May 31, 2003
- Preceded by: Kent Hance
- Succeeded by: Randy Neugebauer

Personal details
- Born: Larry Ed Combest; March 20, 1945 (age 81) Memphis, Texas, U.S.
- Party: Republican
- Education: West Texas A&M University (BBA)
- Combest's voice Combest supporting the Crop Year 2001 Agricultural Economic Assistance Act. Recorded June 26, 2001

Larry Ed Combest (born March 20, 1945) is a retired American who represented Texas in the U.S. House of Representatives from 1985 to 2003 as a Republican.

== Early life ==
Combest was born in Memphis, Texas, a small town in West Texas and the seat of Hall County. In 1969, he earned his bachelor of business administration degree from West Texas State University in Canyon. His family operated a farm for four generations. In 1971, he served briefly as director of the Agricultural Stabilization and Conservation Service of the U.S. Department of Agriculture. He then became legislative assistant to Republican U.S. Senator John Tower from 1971 to 1978, having left after Tower won his fourth and final term in office. From 1978 until his election to Congress six years later, Combest was in private business.

== Congressional career ==
In 1984, Democratic Congressman Kent Hance did not run for a fourth term but instead ran unsuccessfully for his party's nomination for the United States Senate. Combest won the Republican nomination in a runoff over fellow Lubbock conservative Ron Fleming. Combest was elected in November amid Ronald Reagan's landslide reelection victory that year. Democratic presidential nominee Walter F. Mondale barely managed 20 percent of the vote in much of the district. Combest received 102,805 votes (58.1 percent) to 74,044 (41.9 percent) for Democrat Don R. Richards, a former Hance aide.

Combest was only the third person to represent the 19th District since its creation in 1934, and the first Republican. Combest was thus one of six freshmen Republican congressmen elected from Texas in 1984 known as the Texas Six Pack. Although the 19th had become increasingly friendly to Republicans over the years (a Democratic presidential candidate has not carried the district since Lyndon B. Johnson in 1964), conservative Democrats continued to win most races at the state and local level until 1994's Republican Revolution.

However, proving just how Republican this district had become at the national level, Combest was reelected nine times with no substantive Democratic opposition. He ran unopposed in 1990 and 1994 and with no major-party opposition in 2000 and 2002.

Combest served as chairman of the House Intelligence Committee in the 104th Congress (1995–1997) and chairman of the House Agriculture Committee in the 106th and 107th Congresses (1999–2003).

After the deaths of his father and a daughter within a short period of time, Combest announced his pending resignation on November 12, 2002 – a week after winning a tenth term. He said that he and his wife, Sharon, "realize[d] how fragile life and health are. They certainly caused us to rearrange our priorities and we want to spend as much time together while we have our life and health." He resigned from the House on May 31, 2003. Fellow Republican Randy Neugebauer won the special election to replace Combest and was sworn into office on June 3, 2003.

In 2006, lawyers for the NAACP discovered that Combest was one of six Republican congressional leaders who secretly requested an IRS investigation into the NAACP's tax-exempt status after NAACP chairman Julian Bond called Bush's policies racially divisive.

One of Combest's interns, Morgan Meyer, was in 2014 elected as a Republican to the Texas House of Representatives from District 108 in Dallas County.

U.S. House of Representatives
Preceded by Kent Hance	Member of the U.S. House of Representatives from Texas's 19th congressional district 1985–2003	Succeeded by Randy Neugebauer
Preceded by Dan Glickman	Chair of the House Intelligence Committee; 1995–1997	Succeeded by Porter Goss
Preceded by Bob Smith	Chair of the House Agriculture Committee; 1999–2003	Succeeded by Bob Goodlatte
U.S. order of precedence (ceremonial)
Preceded by Bart Stupak as Former U.S. Representative	Order of precedence of the United States as Former U.S. Representative	Succeeded by John Culberson as Former U.S. Representative
