= Dick Armey =

American economist and politician (born 1940)

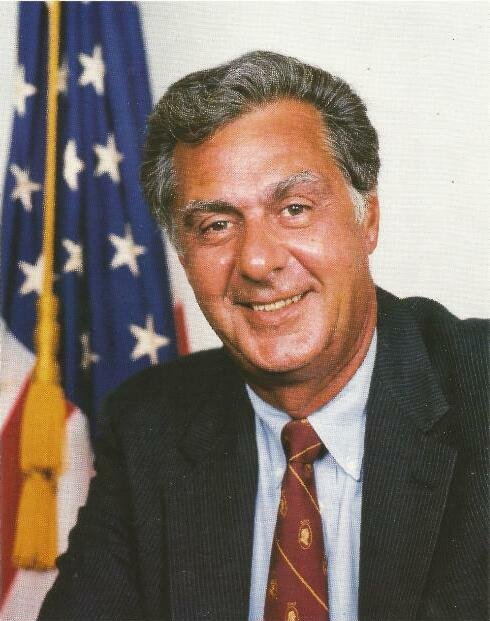
- Official portrait, 1997

Chair of the House Homeland Security Committee
- In office June 19, 2002 – January 3, 2003
- Preceded by: Position established
- Succeeded by: Christopher Cox

House Majority Leader
- In office January 3, 1995 – January 3, 2003
- Speaker: Newt Gingrich; Dennis Hastert
- Preceded by: Dick Gephardt
- Succeeded by: Tom DeLay

Chair of the House Republican Conference
- In office January 3, 1993 – January 3, 1995
- Deputy: Bill McCollum
- Leader: Bob Michel
- Preceded by: Jerry Lewis
- Succeeded by: John Boehner

Member of the U.S. House of Representatives from Texas's 26th district
- In office January 3, 1985 – January 3, 2003
- Preceded by: Tom Vandergriff
- Succeeded by: Michael C. Burgess

Personal details
- Born: Richard Keith Armey; July 7, 1940 (age 86) Cando, North Dakota, U.S.
- Party: Republican
- Spouse: Susan Armey
- Children: 5
- Education: Jamestown College (BA); University of North Dakota (MA); University of Oklahoma (PhD)
- Dick Armey's voice Armey on the successes of the Republican-majority Congress. Recorded August 1, 1996

Richard Keith Armey (/ˈɑːrmi/; born July 7, 1940) is an American economist and politician. He was a U.S. representative from Texas's 26th congressional district (1985–2003) and House majority leader (1995–2003). He was one of the engineers of the "Republican Revolution" of the 1990s, in which Republicans were elected to majorities of both houses of Congress for the first time in four decades. Armey was one of the chief authors of the Contract with America. Armey is also an author and former economics professor. After his retirement from Congress, he has worked as a consultant, advisor, and lobbyist.

== Early life, education and career ==
Armey was born on July 7, 1940, in the farming town of Cando, North Dakota, the son of Marion (née Gutschlag) and Glenn Armey. He grew up in a rural area. He graduated from Jamestown College with a Bachelor of Arts and then received a Master of Arts from the University of North Dakota and a PhD in economics from the University of Oklahoma. Armey is a member of the Pi Kappa Alpha fraternity.

Armey served on the economics faculty at the University of Montana from 1964 to 1965. He was an assistant professor of economics at West Texas State (now West Texas A&M University) from 1967 to 1968, at Austin College from 1968 to 1972, and at North Texas State (now the University of North Texas) from 1972 to 1977. He served as chairman of the economics department at North Texas State University from 1977 to 1983.

Armey has been married twice. His first marriage resulted in three children; it ended in divorce. He married his second wife, Susan Armey, who already had two children, even though she called off the marriage three times.

== U.S. House of Representatives ==
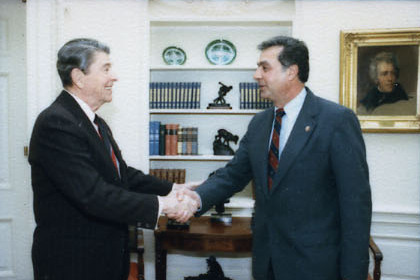
Armey with President Ronald Reagan in October 1988

Armey was elected to the United States House of Representatives in 1984 in Texas's 26th congressional district, narrowly defeating freshman congressman Tom Vandergriff. Armey was one of six freshmen Republican Party congressmen elected from Texas in 1984 who were known as the Texas Six Pack. He would never face another contest anywhere near that close, and was reelected eight more times, never dropping below 68 percent of the vote. His strongest performance was in 1998, when the Democrats didn't field a candidate and Armey defeated a Libertarian with 88 percent of the vote. This mirrored the growing Republican trend in his district.

In his early years in Congress, Armey was influenced by Austrian economist Ludwig von Mises.

=== The Republican Revolution and party leadership ===
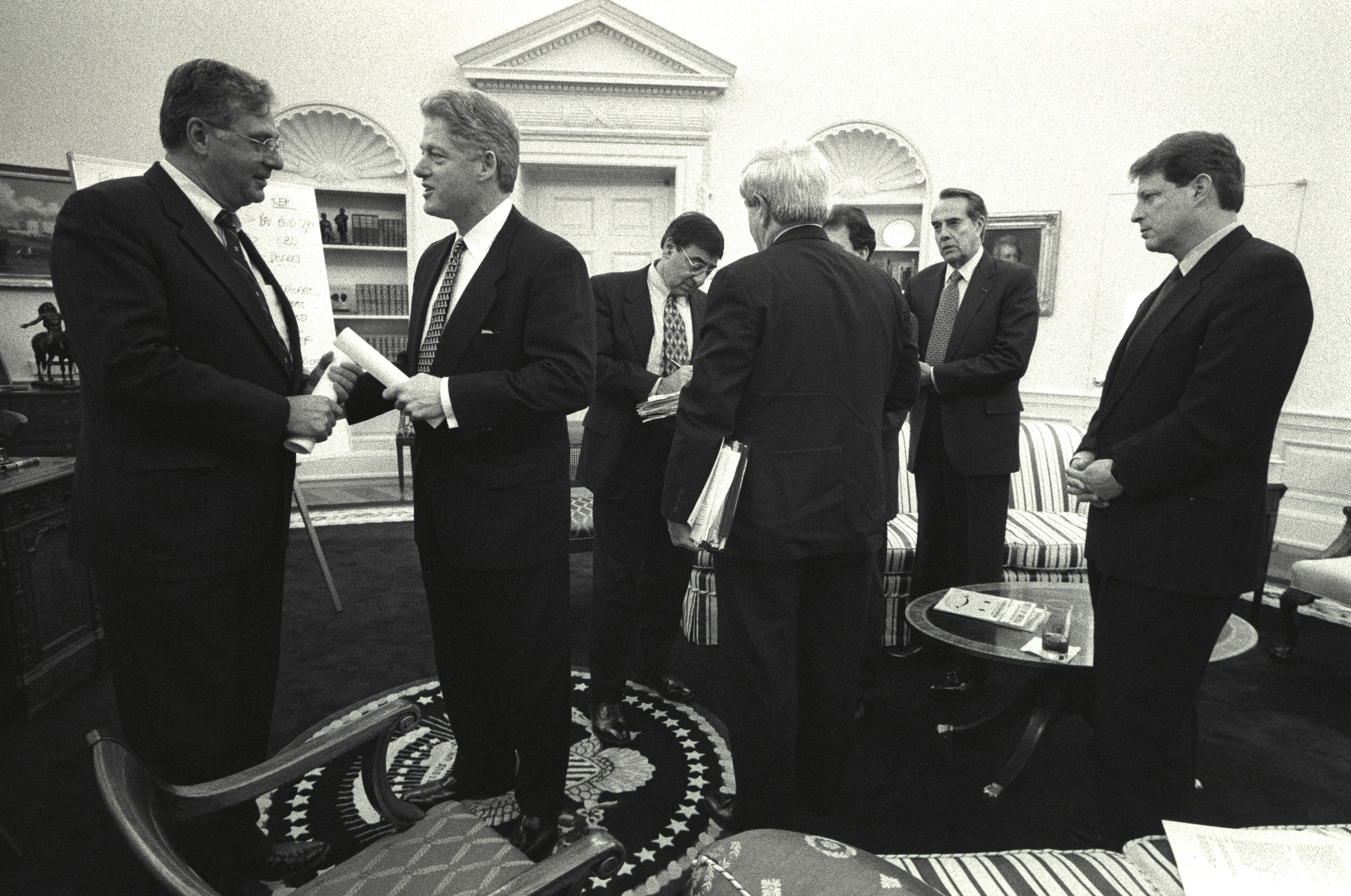
Armey during budget negotiations with President Bill Clinton in January 1996

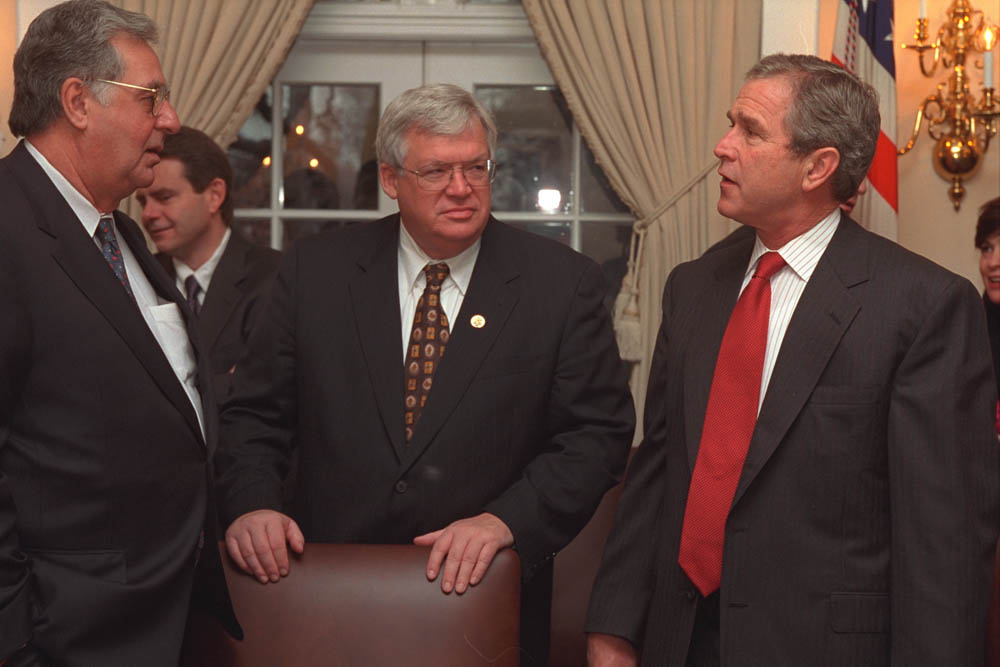
Armey with President George W. Bush and Dennis Hastert in January 2001

In 1994, Armey, then House Republican Conference Chairman, joined Minority Whip Newt Gingrich in drafting the Contract with America. Republican members credited this election platform with the Republican takeover of Congress (the Republican Revolution). Gingrich became Speaker of the United States House of Representatives, and Armey became Gingrich's second-in-command as House Majority Leader. Gingrich delegated to Armey an unprecedented level of authority over scheduling legislation on the House floor, a power traditionally reserved to the Speaker.

In 1995, Armey referred to openly gay Congressman Barney Frank as "Barney Fag". Armey said it was a slip of the tongue. Frank did not accept Armey's explanation, saying, "I turned to my own expert, my mother, who reports that in 59 years of marriage, no one ever introduced her as Elsie Fag."

=== Leadership challenges ===
In the summer of 1997, several House Republicans attempted to replace Gingrich as Speaker. The attempted "coup" began on July 9 with a meeting between Republican conference chairman John Boehner of Ohio and Republican leadership chairman Bill Paxon of New York. According to their plan, House Majority Leader Armey, House Majority Whip Tom DeLay, Boehner, and Paxon were to present Gingrich with an ultimatum: resign, or be voted out. Under the new plan, Paxon was to replace Gingrich as Speaker. However, Armey balked at the proposal, and told his chief of staff to warn Gingrich about the coup. On July 11, Gingrich met with senior Republican leadership to assess the situation. He explained that under no circumstance would he step down. If he were voted out, there would be a new election for Speaker, which would allow for the possibility that Democrats and dissenting Republicans would vote in Dick Gephardt as Speaker. Paxon resigned his post, feeling that he had not handled the situation correctly. Paxon later considered, then rejected, a challenge to Armey's post as majority leader, and did not run for re-election in 1998.

Republicans suffered heavy losses in the 1998 elections, but remained the majority party in the House. Armey had to defeat a challenge for his majority leader post from Steve Largent of Oklahoma, a member of the Republican class of 1994. Although Armey was not popular in the Republican caucus, Largent was thought to be too conservative for some moderate Republicans, and Armey won on the third ballot.

Gingrich had already resigned as Speaker in the aftermath of the 1998 election, with Bob Livingston of Louisiana chosen by the party to serve as his replacement. Before the new Congress convened in January, however, Livingston announced he would not serve as Speaker, following the revelation of an extramarital affair. Armey initially seemed to have the inside track to become Speaker; as majority leader, he was the number-two Republican in the chamber. However, he was still badly wounded from Largent's challenge, and opted not to run. The post eventually went to Chief Deputy Whip Dennis Hastert of Illinois.

=== Later congressional career ===
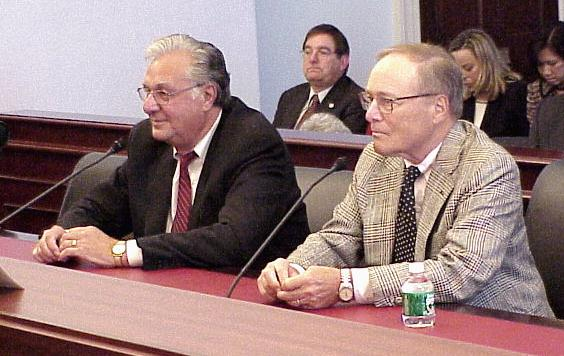
Armey with Bill Archer at a House Budget Committee meeting in October 2004

Armey served another four years before announcing his retirement in 2002.

In his later terms in office, Armey feuded with Focus on the Family leader James Dobson. Armey wrote, "As Majority Leader, I remember vividly a meeting with the House leadership where Dobson scolded us for having failed to 'deliver' for Christian conservatives, that we owed our majority to him, and that he had the power to take our jobs back. This offended me, and I told him so." Armey states that Focus on the Family targeted him politically after the incident, writing, "Focus on the Family deliberately perpetuates the lie that I am a consultant to the ACLU." Armey has also said that "Dobson and his gang of thieves are real nasty bullies."

In Armey's final term, he was named chairman of the United States House Committee on Homeland Security and was the primary sponsor of the legislation that created the Department of Homeland Security. After Armey's retirement, fellow Texan Tom DeLay was elevated to Armey's Majority Leader position. Armey's son, Scott, ran for his father's seat in the 2002 election, but lost in the Republican Party runoff to Michael C. Burgess, who would go on to hold the strongly Republican 26th District for the GOP in November.

One of Armey's former Congressional staff members, Dade Phelan, was elected in 2014 to the Texas House of Representatives as a Republican, representing the Beaumont area in House District 21. In January 2021, Phelan was elected the 76th Speaker of the Texas House of Representatives.

== Advisor and lobbyist ==
=== DLA Piper ===
After leaving office, Armey joined the Washington office of the law firm DLA Piper as a senior policy advisor. Armey was also the firm's co-chairman of its Homeland Security Task Force. In 2009, Armey's FreedomWorks group launched a campaign against health care reform proposals, accusing the Obama administration of attempting to "socialize medicine". DLA Piper was concerned about the conflict of interest, particularly since their clients were spending millions in advertising and lobbying money to support the passage of health care reform, and FreedomWorks was linked to demonstrations at town hall forums where health care reform was being discussed. Amid what Politico called "the health care flap", DLA Piper asked Armey to resign in August 2009, and he left the firm.

=== FreedomWorks ===
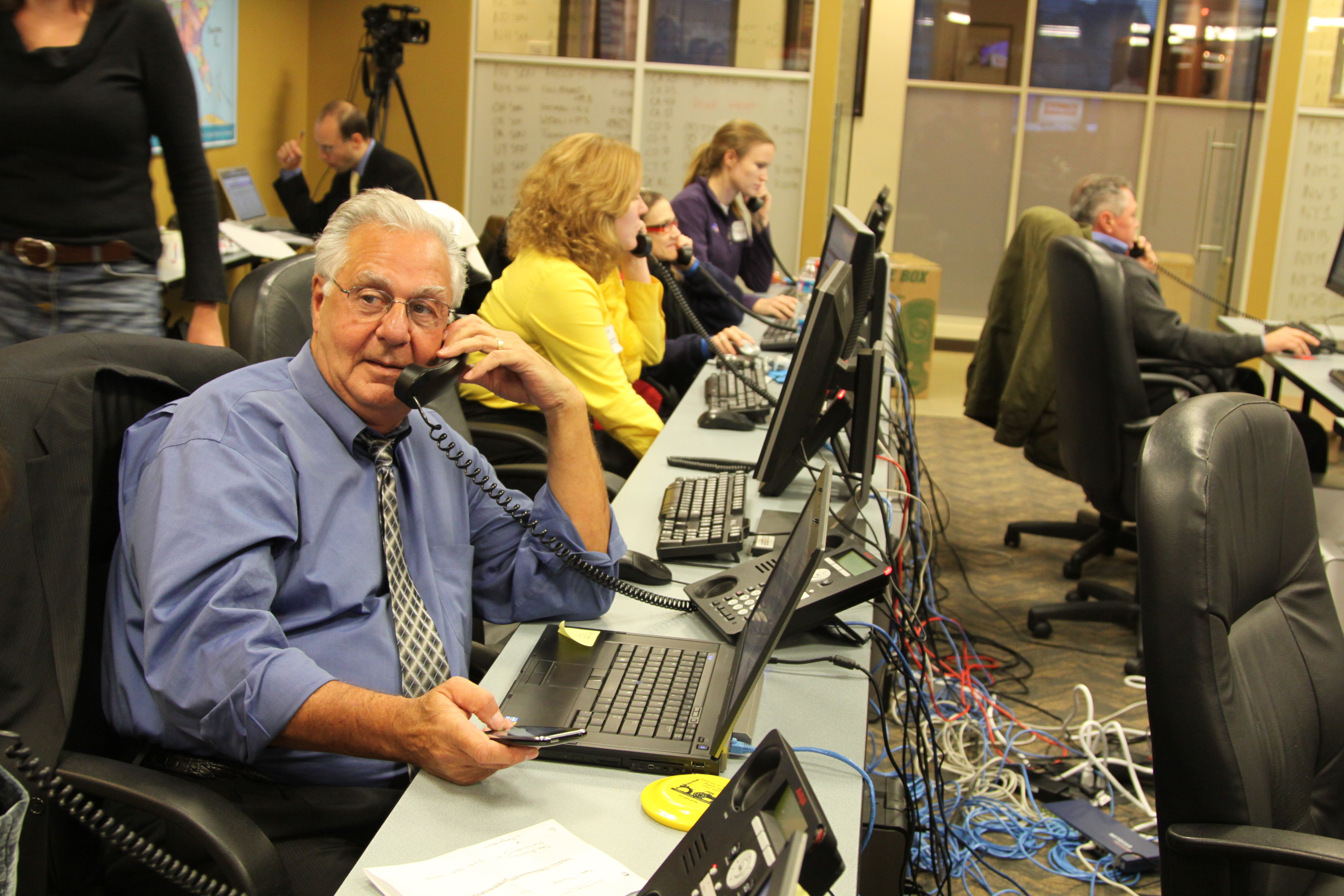
Armey in the War Room at Freedomworks during the 2010 elections

In 2003, Armey became co-chairman of Citizens for a Sound Economy, which in 2004 merged with Empower America to become FreedomWorks. The group's name was derived from a common Armey saying: "Freedom works. Freedom is good policy and good politics." FreedomWorks is a conservative non-profit organization based in Washington D.C. In his role as chairman, Armey was a national political figure. He traveled widely, meeting with activists and legislators. In 2005, he testified before the President's Advisory Panel on Tax Reform and debated Governor of Colorado Bill Owens on a tax increase ballot measure. The Center for Public Integrity reported that Armey was paid $500,000 per year and flew first class, along with other FreedomWorks employees, for work travel.

On December 3, 2012 Mother Jones reported that Armey, in an email on November 30 to Matt Kibbe, president of FreedomWorks Inc., resigned his positions as chairman and trustee of FreedomWorks and severed all his ties to that organization, effective immediately. Mother Jones reported that Armey's reasons for resigning were "matters of principle. It's how you do business as opposed to what you do. But I don't want to be the guy to create problems." The Associated Press reported that in September 2012, Armey agreed to resign by November 2012 in exchange for $8 million in consulting fees paid in annual $400,000 installments.

On December 25, 2012, The Washington Post reported that Armey had escorted Matt Kibbe and FreedomWorks' Vice President Adam Brandon out of the FreedomWorks offices with the help of an armed guard on September 4, 2012. Armey reportedly wanted FreedomWorks to support Todd Akin after his controversial "legitimate rape" comments.

== Political positions ==
=== Economy and taxation ===
As a free-market economist influenced by the ideas of Milton Friedman, Armey favored relatively open immigration and advocated for free trade. Armey was one of Congress's fervent supporters of privatization of Social Security and phasing-out of farm subsidies. He was a strong supporter of replacing the progressive tax with a flat tax. Armey was very critical of a competing tax reform proposal that would replace the current system with a national sales tax, the FairTax. During his time in Congress, Armey conceived the Base Realignment and Closure Commission that became responsible for closing military bases as a cost-cutting measure. After his retirement from Congress, he told The New York Times: "A lot of people say if you cut defense, you're demonstrating less than a full commitment to our nation's security, and that's baloney."

=== Health care ===
In 1999, Armey sponsored the Fair Care for the Uninsured Act, something that would later be proposed by Mark Kennedy after Armey left Congress. It proposed using tax credits to offset the cost of health insurance, allowing individuals to go outside the workplace to obtain private health coverage directly from an insurance company, and the creation of a "safety net" for the uninsured. The law never made it through Congress, but some of these concepts did make it into the Massachusetts health care reform of 2006 and from there into the Patient Protection and Affordable Care Act (informally known as Obamacare) in 2010. Armey is a vocal opponent of the individual mandate to purchase health benefits. He also voiced public opposition to the individual mandate when it was proposed by First Lady Hillary Clinton during the contentious national health care reform debate of 1993 and 1994.

=== Foreign policy ===
In 2006, Michael Isikoff's book Hubris included Armey as an on-the-record source, who said he was initially reluctant to support the Bush administration's call for war with Iraq, and that he had warned President George W. Bush that such a war might be a "quagmire". Armey said that the intelligence presented to him in support of the war appeared questionable, but he gave Bush the benefit of the doubt. According to Barton Gellman, former Vice President Dick Cheney told Armey that Saddam Hussein's family had direct ties to Al-Qaeda and that Saddam was developing miniature nuclear weapons. Armey then voted for the Iraq War, but after it became clear this was not true, stated that he "deserved better from Cheney than to be bullshitted by him." Robert Draper's Dead Certain: The Presidency of George W. Bush recounts a conversation in late summer 2002 between Armey and Cheney. Armey insisted that American forces would get "mired down" in Iraq if they invaded, but Cheney offered this assurance: "They're going to welcome us. It'll be like the American army going through the streets of Paris. They're sitting there ready to form a new government. The people will be so happy with their freedoms that we'll probably back ourselves out of there within a month or two."

On May 1, 2002, on MSNBC's Hardball with Chris Matthews, Armey called for Palestinians to be expelled from the Palestinian Occupied Territories. Armey, a staunch supporter of Israel, repeatedly said that he would be "content" with Israel completely taking over all of the Palestinian Occupied Territories and transferring the Palestinian population out. He further stated that the Palestinians could then build their state in the "many Arab nations that have many hundreds of thousands of acres of land". In September 2002 he stated that "my No. 1 priority in foreign policy is to protect Israel".

== Books ==
- Armey, Dick (1995). The Freedom Revolution. Washington, DC: Regnery. ISBN 978-0-89526-469-5.
- Armey, Dick (1996). The Flat Tax: A Citizen's Guide to the Facts on What It Will Do for You, Your Country, and Your Pocketbook. New York: Ballantine. ISBN 978-0-449-91095-5.
- Armey, Dick (2003). Armey's Axioms: 40 Hard-Earned Truths from Politics, Faith, and Life. New York: Wiley. ISBN 978-0-471-46913-1.
- Armey, Dick; Matt Kibbe (2010). Give Us Liberty: A Tea Party Manifesto. New York: William Morrow. ISBN 978-0-06-201587-7.
- Armey, Richard K. (1977). Price Theory: a Policy-Welfare Approach. New Jersey: Prentice-Hall. ISBN 0-13-699694-9.

== See also ==
- Revolving door (politics)

U.S. House of Representatives
Preceded by Tom Vandergriff	Member of the U.S. House of Representatives from Texas's 26th congressional district 1985–2003	Succeeded by Michael C. Burgess
Preceded by Dick Gephardt	House Majority Leader; 1995–2003	Succeeded by Tom DeLay
New office	Chair of the House Homeland Security Committee; 2002–2003	Succeeded by Christopher Cox
Party political offices
Preceded by Jerry Lewis	Chair of the House Republican Conference; 1993–1995	Succeeded by John Boehner
Preceded by Newt Gingrich	House Republican Deputy Leader; 1995–2003	Succeeded by Tom DeLay
U.S. order of precedence (ceremonial)
Preceded by Dick Gephardt as Former House Majority Leader	Order of precedence of the United States as Former House Majority Leader	Succeeded by Tom DeLay as Former House Majority Leader
