= 2006 United States House of Representatives elections in Texas =

- November 7, 2006; December 12 (District 23 runoff)

All 32 Texas seats to the United States House of Representatives
- Turnout: 4,179,701 - 25%
	Majority party	Minority party
Party	Republican	Democratic
Seats before	21	11
Seats won	19	13
Seat change	▼2	▲2
Popular vote	2,184,261	1,852,613
Percentage	52.26%	44.32%
Swing	▼5.4%	▲5.3%

Republican
40–50%
50–60%
60–70%
70–80%
80–90%
90>%
Democratic
40–50%
50–60%
60–70%
70–80%
80–90%
90>%

The 2006 United States House of Representatives elections in Texas were held on November 7, 2006, to determine the 32 U.S. representatives from the state of Texas, one from each of the state's 32 congressional districts. These elections coincided with the 2006 midterm elections, which included a gubernatorial election and an election to the U.S. Senate.

Texas underwent a second round of mid-decade redistricting as a result of the Supreme Court case League of United Latin American Citizens v. Perry. The court had ruled that district 23 violated the Voting Rights Act. Due to this ruling, the 15th, 21st, 23rd, 25th, and 28th districts were redrawn after the primary election had occurred, voiding the results. These districts instead conducted special elections concurrent with the general elections. This election marks the first time Democrats made a net gain of seats over Republicans since the 1992 elections.

== Overview ==
2006 United States House of Representatives elections in Texas*
Party	Votes*	Percentage	Seats before	Seats after	+/–
Republican	2,184,261	52.26%	21	19	−2
Democratic	1,852,613	44.32%	11	13	+2
Libertarian	117,313	2.81%	0	0	0
Independent	16,131	.39%	0	0	0
Constitution	9,383	.23%	0	0	0
Totals	4,179,701	100.00%	32	32	—

(*elections in the 15th, 21st, 23rd, 25th, and 28th were conducted under the Nonpartisan blanket primary format)

== District 1 ==
2006 Texas's 1st congressional district election
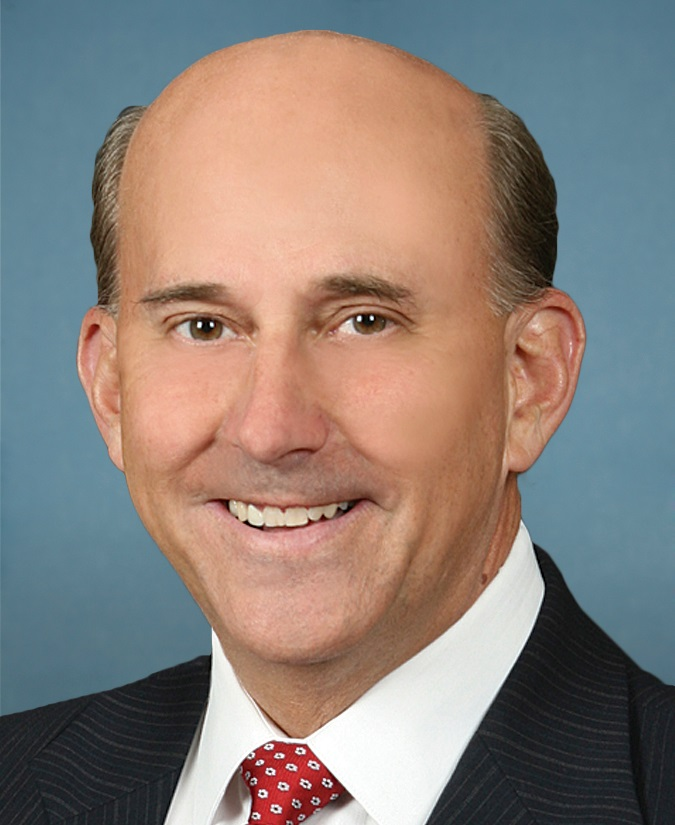

Nominee	Louie Gohmert	Roger Owen
Party	Republican	Democratic
Popular vote	104,080	46,290
Percentage	68.0%	30.3%
- County results Gohmert: 50–60% 60–70% 70–80% Owen: 40–50%
U.S. Representative before election
Louis Gohmert
Republican
Elected U.S. Representative
Louis Gohmert
Republican

Freshman Congressman Louis Gohmert (R-Tyler), elected in 2004 after redistricting in East Texas, faced Roger Owen (D) of Hallsville in the general election, along with Libertarian nominee Donald Perkinson. Gohmert was one of four Republicans who succeeded in defeating incumbent Democrats with help from a controversial redistricting effort orchestrated by former House Majority Leader Tom DeLay.

=== Predictions ===
Source	Ranking	As of
The Cook Political Report	Safe R	November 6, 2006
Rothenberg	Safe R	November 6, 2006
Sabato's Crystal Ball	Safe R	November 6, 2006
Real Clear Politics	Safe R	November 7, 2006
CQ Politics	Safe R	November 7, 2006

2006 U.S. House election: Texas district 1
Party	Candidate	Votes	%	±%
Republican	Louis Gohmert	104,080	68.01	+6.54
Democratic	Roger Owen	46,290	30.25	−7.43
Libertarian	Donald Perkinson	2,667	1.74	+0.9
Majority		57,790	37.76	
Turnout		153,037		
Republican hold		Swing	+13.97	

== District 2 ==
2006 Texas's 2nd congressional district election
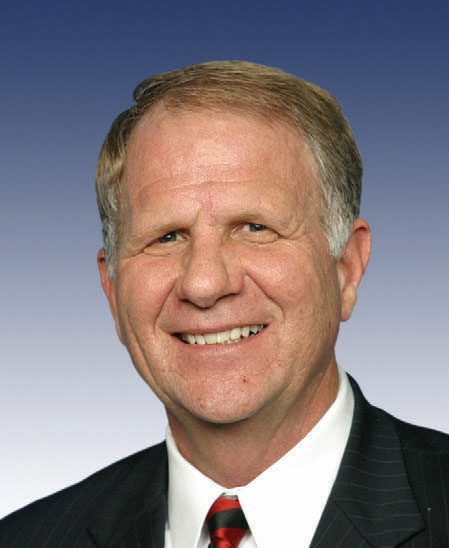

Nominee	Ted Poe	Gary Binderim
Party	Republican	Democratic
Popular vote	90,332	45,027
Percentage	65.6%	32.7%
- County results Poe: 50–60% 60–70% 70–80%
U.S. Representative before election
Ted Poe
Republican
Elected U.S. Representative
Ted Poe
Republican

In 2004, Ted Poe (R-Humble) unseated Democrat Nick Lampson after heavy redistricting changed the political landscape, allowing him to win with 55% of the vote. His opponent in November was Democrat Gary Binderim, along with the Libertarian Justo J. Perez.

=== Predictions ===
Source	Ranking	As of
The Cook Political Report	Safe R	November 6, 2006
Rothenberg	Safe R	November 6, 2006
Sabato's Crystal Ball	Safe R	November 6, 2006
Real Clear Politics	Safe R	November 7, 2006
CQ Politics	Safe R	November 7, 2006

2006 U.S. House election: Texas district 2
Party	Candidate	Votes	%	±%
Republican	Ted Poe	90,332	65.62	+10.1
Democratic	Gary Binderim	45,027	32.71	−10.2
Libertarian	Justo Perez	2,294	1.67	+0.12
Majority		45,305	32.91	
Turnout		137,653		
Republican hold		Swing	+20.3	

== District 3 ==
2006 Texas's 3rd congressional district election
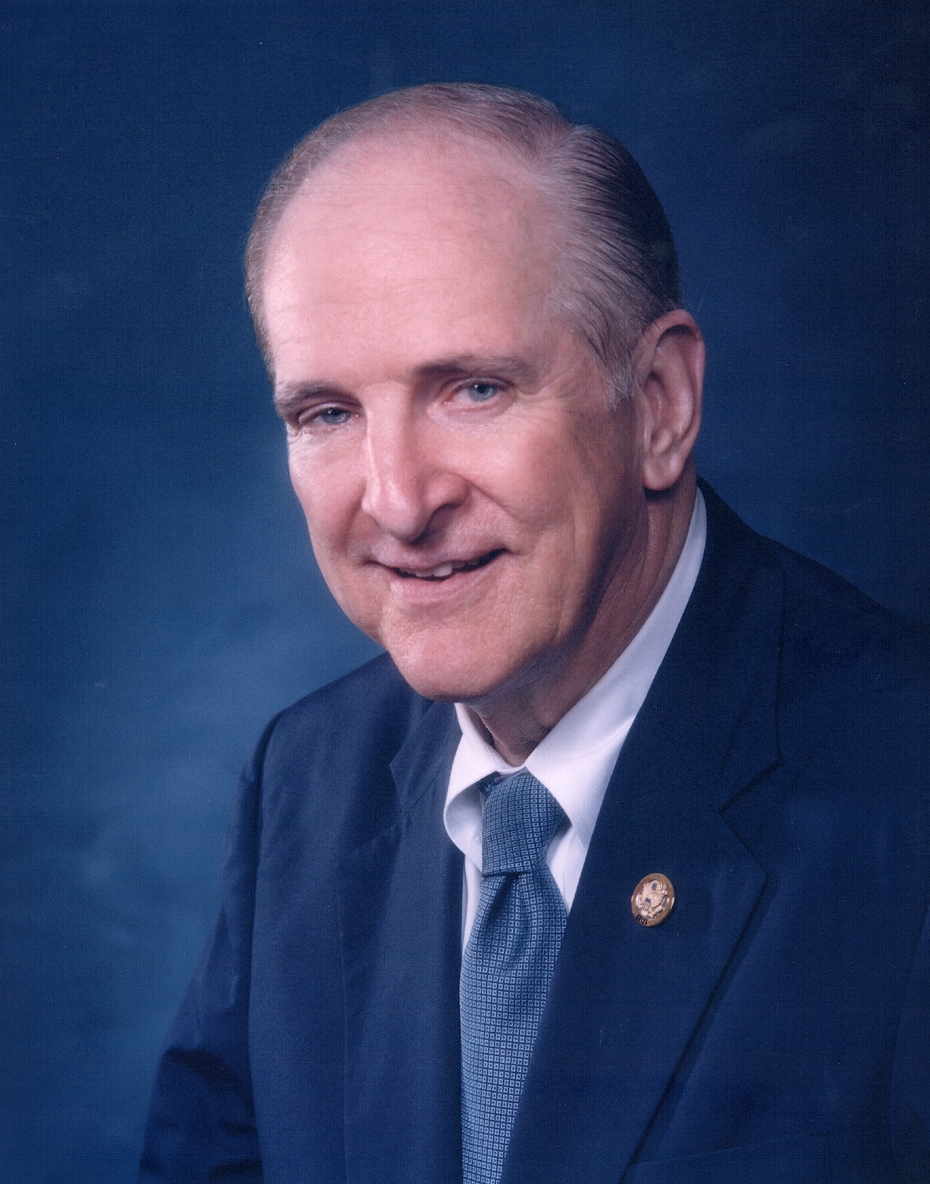

Nominee	Sam Johnson	Dan Dodd
Party	Republican	Democratic
Popular vote	88,634	49,488
Percentage	62.5%	34.9%
- County results Johnson: 50–60% 60–70%
U.S. Representative before election
Sam Johnson
Republican
Elected U.S. Representative
Sam Johnson
Republican

Incumbent Sam Johnson (R-Plano) faced Dan Dodd, Democrat from McKinney, and Libertarian Christopher J. Claytor in the general election. This district is dominated by the Republican stronghold of Collin County, as well as Garland, another large Dallas suburb.

=== Endorsements ===
Dan Dodd (D)

Individuals

- Wesley Clark, General, 2004 democratic presidential candidate

==== Predictions ====
Source	Ranking	As of
The Cook Political Report	Safe R	November 6, 2006
Rothenberg	Safe R	November 6, 2006
Sabato's Crystal Ball	Safe R	November 6, 2006
Real Clear Politics	Safe R	November 7, 2006
CQ Politics	Safe R	November 7, 2006

2006 U.S. House election: Texas district 3
Party	Candidate	Votes	%	±%
Republican	Sam Johnson	88,634	62.52	−23.09
Democratic	Dan Dodd	49,488	34.91	+34.91
Libertarian	Christopher Claytor	3,656	2.58	−3.73
Majority		39,146	27.61	
Turnout		141,778		
Republican hold		Swing	−49.44	

== District 4 ==
2006 Texas's 4th congressional district election
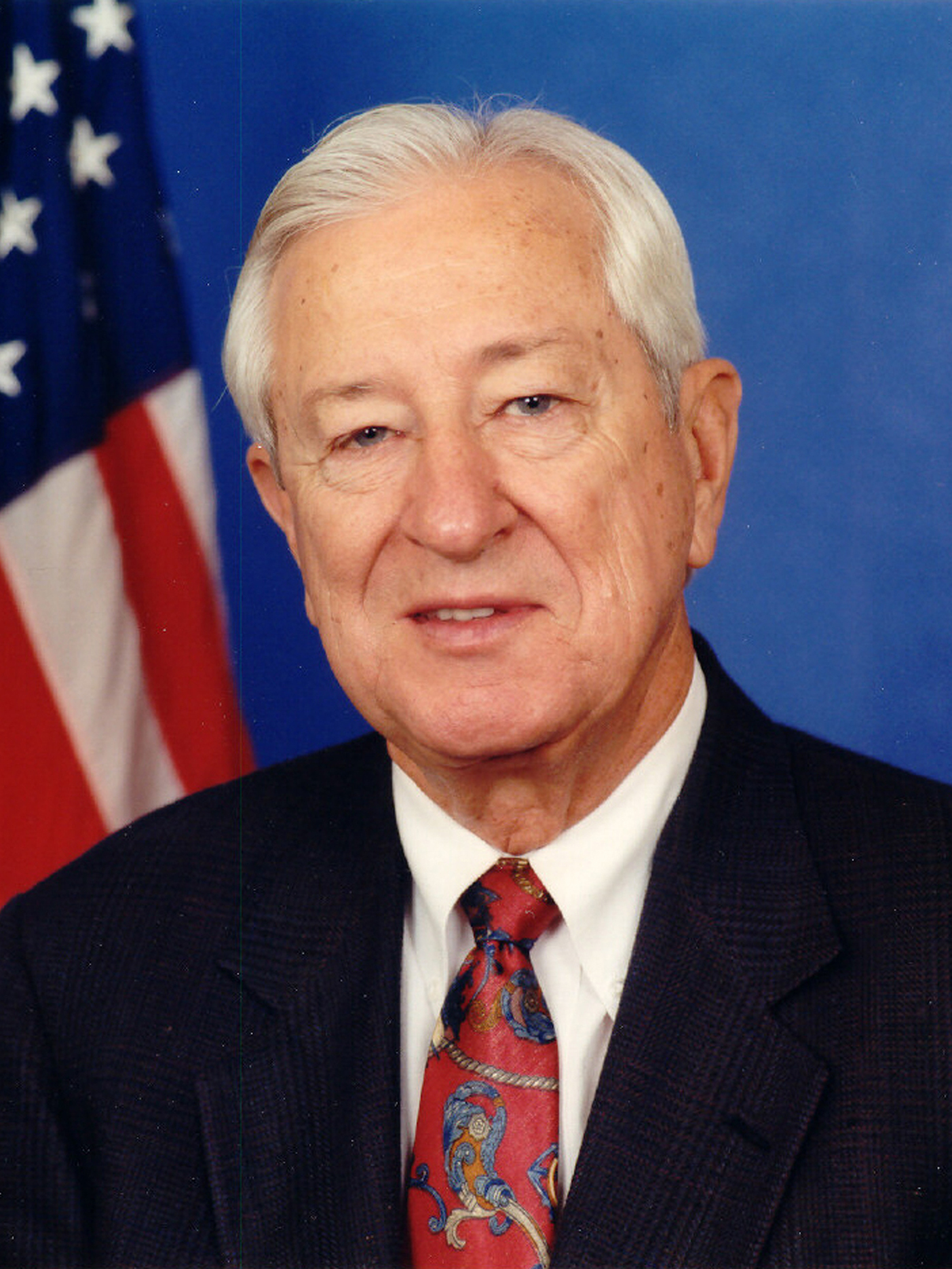

Nominee	Ralph Hall	Glenn Melancon
Party	Republican	Democratic
Popular vote	106,268	54,892
Percentage	64.6%	33.3%
- County results Hall: 50–60% 60–70% 70–80% Melancon: 50–60%
U.S. Representative before election
Ralph Hall
Republican
Elected U.S. Representative
Ralph Hall
Republican

25-year incumbent Ralph Hall (R-Rockwall), who switched from the Democratic Party shortly before the 2004 election, faced Democrat Glenn Melancon of Sherman and Libertarian Kurt G. Helm. Though it is best known as the district of the well known former Speaker Sam Rayburn, and thus a long Democratic stronghold, the southern end of the district consists of Republican-dominated Dallas suburbs.

=== Endorsements ===
Glenn Melancon (D)

Individuals

- Wesley Clark, General, 2004 democratic presidential candidate

==== Predictions ====
Source	Ranking	As of
The Cook Political Report	Safe R	November 6, 2006
Rothenberg	Safe R	November 6, 2006
Sabato's Crystal Ball	Safe R	November 6, 2006
Real Clear Politics	Safe R	November 7, 2006
CQ Politics	Safe R	November 7, 2006

2006 U.S. House election: Texas district 4
Party	Candidate	Votes	%	±%
Republican	Ralph Hall	106,268	64.55	−3.69
Democratic	Glenn Melancon	54,892	33.34	+2.90
Libertarian	Kurt G. Helm	3,481	2.11	+1.81
Majority		51,376	31.21	
Turnout		164,641		
Republican hold		Swing	−6.59	

== District 5 ==
2006 Texas's 5th congressional district election
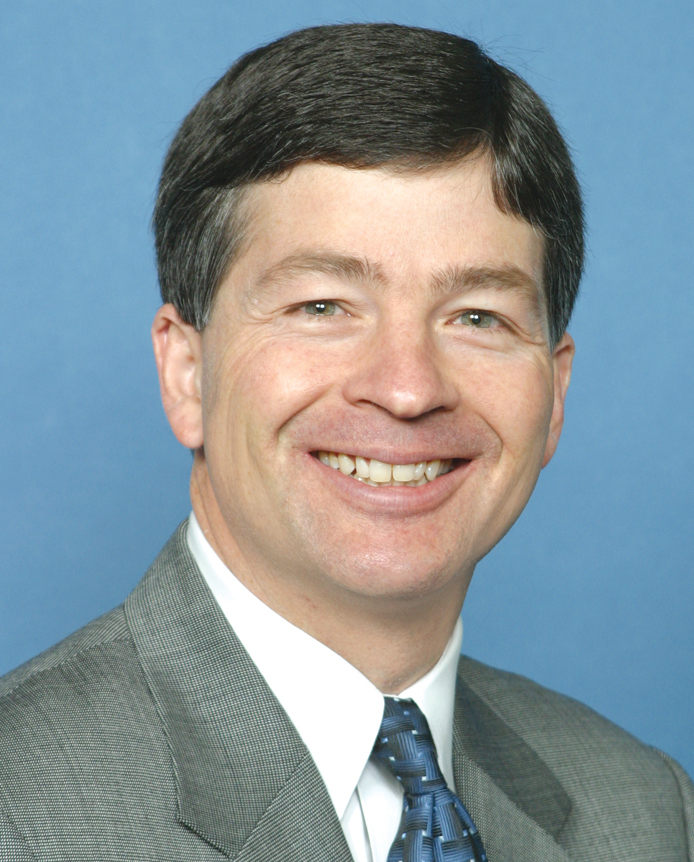

Nominee	Jeb Hensarling	Charlie Thompson
Party	Republican	Democratic
Popular vote	85,081	49,253
Percentage	61.7%	35.7%
- County results Hensarling: 50–60% 60–70%
U.S. Representative before election
Jeb Hensarling
Republican
Elected U.S. Representative
Jeb Hensarling
Republican

Incumbent Jeb Hensarling (R-Dallas) faced Democrat Charlie Thompson of Athens in the general election, along with Libertarian Mike Nelson.

=== Predictions ===
Source	Ranking	As of
The Cook Political Report	Safe R	November 6, 2006
Rothenberg	Safe R	November 6, 2006
Sabato's Crystal Ball	Safe R	November 6, 2006
Real Clear Politics	Safe R	November 7, 2006
CQ Politics	Safe R	November 7, 2006

2006 U.S. House election: Texas district 5
Party	Candidate	Votes	%	±%
Republican	Jeb Hensarling	85,081	61.68	−2.78
Democratic	Charlie Thompson	49,253	35.70	+2.82
Libertarian	Mike Nelson	3,616	2.62	−0.03
Majority		35,828	25.98	
Turnout		137,950		
Republican hold		Swing	−5.6	

== District 6 ==
2006 Texas's 6th congressional district election
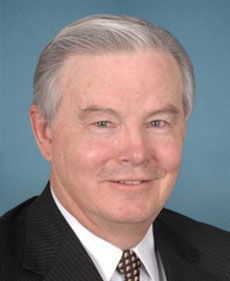

Nominee	Joe Barton	David T. Harris
Party	Republican	Democratic
Popular vote	91,888	56,342
Percentage	60.5%	37.1%
- County results Barton: 50–60% 60–70% 70–80%
U.S. Representative before election
Joe Barton
Republican
Elected U.S. Representative
Joe Barton
Republican

Joe Barton (R-Ennis), who has represented the Sixth District since 1985, faced Democrat David T. Harris of Arlington in November, along with Libertarian Carl Nulsen.

=== Endorsements ===
David T. Harris (D)

Individuals

- Wesley Clark, General, 2004 democratic presidential candidate

==== Predictions ====
Source	Ranking	As of
The Cook Political Report	Safe R	November 6, 2006
Rothenberg	Safe R	November 6, 2006
Sabato's Crystal Ball	Safe R	November 6, 2006
Real Clear Politics	Safe R	November 7, 2006
CQ Politics	Safe R	November 7, 2006

2006 U.S. House election: Texas district 6
Party	Candidate	Votes	%	±%
Republican	Joe Barton	91,888	60.46	−5.56
Democratic	David T. Harris	56,342	37.07	+4.19
Libertarian	Carl Nulsen	3,739	2.46	+1.19
Turnout		151,969		
Majority		35,546	23.39	
Republican hold		Swing	−9.93	

== District 7 ==
2006 Texas's 7th congressional district election
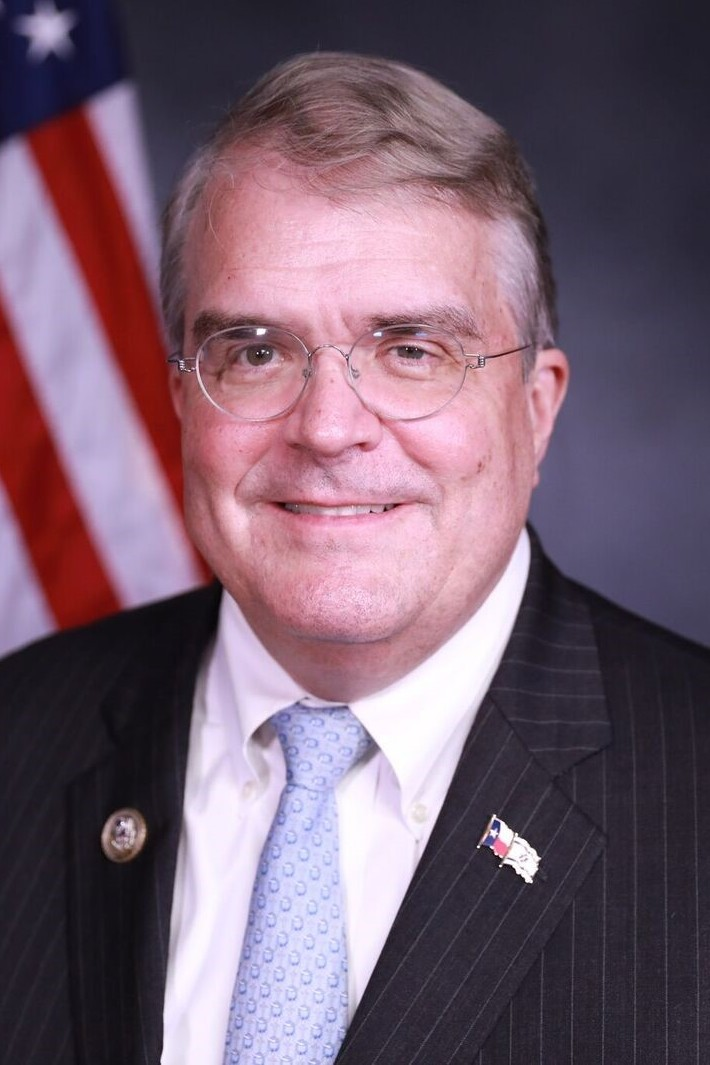

Nominee	John Culberson	Jim Henley
Party	Republican	Democratic
Popular vote	98,761	64,170
Percentage	59.2%	38.5%
U.S. Representative before election
John Culberson
Republican
Elected U.S. Representative
John Culberson
Republican

Incumbent John Culberson (R-Houston) faced Democratic teacher Jim Henley of Houston and Libertarian Drew Parks in the general election in November. The seventh district is one of the most heavily Republican districts in Texas yet it is mostly urban, as it is also one of the wealthiest districts in the country and includes several affluent areas of Houston, including the Upper Kirby, Uptown, Spring Branch-Memorial, and River Oaks neighborhoods, as well as the cities of West University Place, Bellaire, and Jersey Village.

=== Predictions ===
Source	Ranking	As of
The Cook Political Report	Safe R	November 6, 2006
Rothenberg	Safe R	November 6, 2006
Sabato's Crystal Ball	Safe R	November 6, 2006
Real Clear Politics	Safe R	November 7, 2006
CQ Politics	Safe R	November 7, 2006

2006 U.S. House election: Texas district 7
Party	Candidate	Votes	%	±%
Republican	John Culberson	98,761	59.19	−4.92
Democratic	Jim Henley	64,170	38.46	+5.16
Libertarian	Drew Parks	3,921	2.35	+1.12
Majority		34,591	20.73	
Turnout		166,852		
Republican hold		Swing	−10.08	

== District 8 ==
2006 Texas's 8th congressional district election
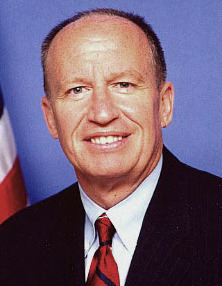

Nominee	Kevin Brady	James Wright
Party	Republican	Democratic
Popular vote	106,943	52,275
Percentage	67.2%	32.8%
- County results Brady: 50–60% 60–70% 70–80% Wright: 50–60%
U.S. Representative before election
Kevin Brady
Republican
Elected U.S. Representative
Kevin Brady
Republican

Kevin Brady (R-The Woodlands), incumbent Congressman since 1996, faced Democrat James Wright of New Caney in November.

=== Predictions ===
Source	Ranking	As of
The Cook Political Report	Safe R	November 6, 2006
Rothenberg	Safe R	November 6, 2006
Sabato's Crystal Ball	Safe R	November 6, 2006
Real Clear Politics	Safe R	November 7, 2006
CQ Politics	Safe R	November 7, 2006

2006 U.S. House election: Texas district 8
Party	Candidate	Votes	%	±%
Republican	Kevin Brady	106,943	67.17	−1.74
Democratic	James Wright	52,275	32.83	+3.17
Majority		54,668	34.34	
Turnout		159,218		
Republican hold		Swing	−4.91	

== District 9 ==
2006 Texas's 9th congressional district election
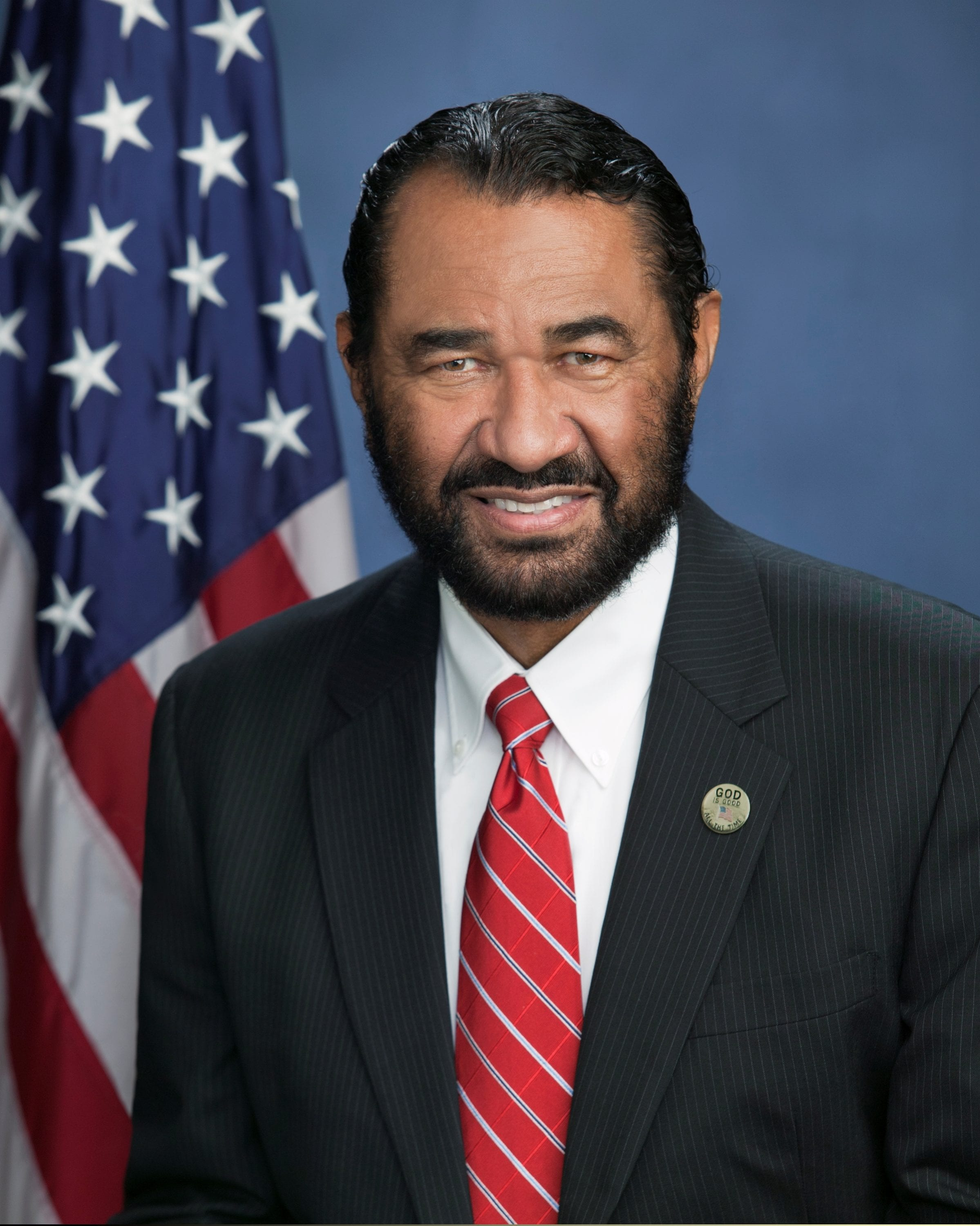
Nominee	Al Green
Party	Democratic
Popular vote	60,253
Percentage	100.0%
U.S. Representative before election
Al Green
Democratic
Elected U.S. Representative
Al Green
Democratic

Freshman Democratic Congressman Al Green of Houston faced no opposition to his re-election.

=== Predictions ===
Source	Ranking	As of
The Cook Political Report	Safe D	November 6, 2006
Rothenberg	Safe D	November 6, 2006
Sabato's Crystal Ball	Safe D	November 6, 2006
Real Clear Politics	Safe D	November 7, 2006
CQ Politics	Safe D	November 7, 2006

2006 U.S. House election: Texas district 9
Party	Candidate	Votes	%	±%
Democratic	Al Green	60,253	100.00	+27.82
Majority		60,253	100.00	
Turnout		60,253		
Democratic hold		Swing	+54.39	

== District 10 ==
2006 Texas's 10th congressional district election
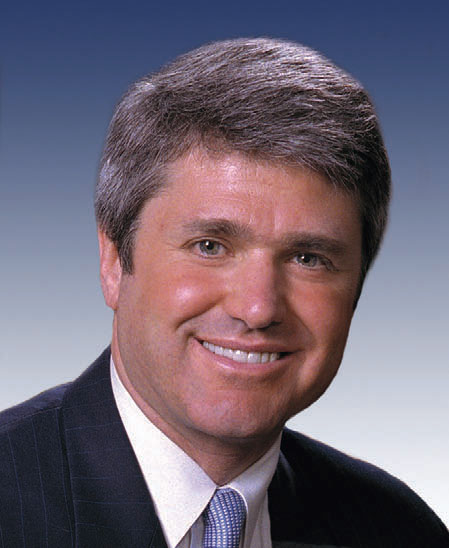

Nominee	Michael McCaul	Ted Ankrum
Party	Republican	Democratic
Popular vote	97,618	71,232
Percentage	55.3%	40.4%
- County results McCaul: 50–60% 60–70% 70–80% Ankrum: 40–50% 50–60%
U.S. Representative before election
Michael McCaul
Republican
Elected U.S. Representative
Michael McCaul
Republican

Incumbent freshman Michael McCaul (R-Austin) faced some minor celebrity in that of 2004 Libertarian presidential nominee Michael Badnarik. Vietnam veteran Ted Ankrum of Houston ran as the Democratic nominee. McCaul was elected with no Democratic opposition in 2004, as the Libertarian candidate captured 15% of the vote (no Libertarian candidate in the entire state garnered more than 4% when running against both major parties). The 10th district spans a large swath of southeast and central Texas from eastern Austin to Harris County west of Houston.

=== Predictions ===
Source	Ranking	As of
The Cook Political Report	Safe R	November 6, 2006
Rothenberg	Safe R	November 6, 2006
Sabato's Crystal Ball	Safe R	November 6, 2006
Real Clear Politics	Safe R	November 7, 2006
CQ Politics	Safe R	November 7, 2006

2006 U.S. House election: Texas district 10
Party	Candidate	Votes	%	±%
Republican	Michael McCaul	97,618	55.32	−23.29
Democratic	Ted Ankrum	71,232	40.37	+40.37
Libertarian	Michael Badnarik	7,603	4.31	−11.04
Majority		26,686	14.95	
Turnout		176,453		
Republican hold		Swing	−48.31	

== District 11 ==
2006 Texas's 11th congressional district election
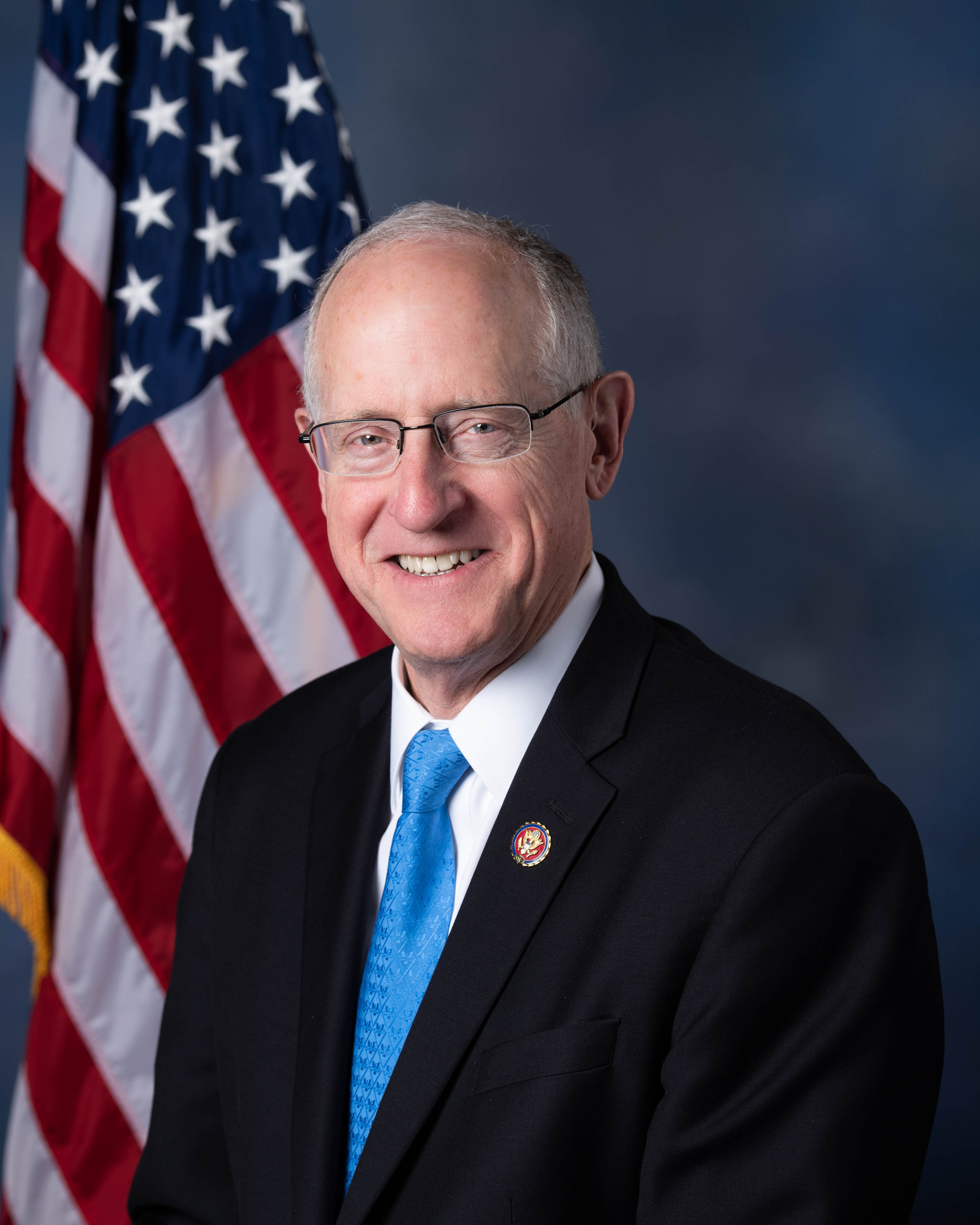
Nominee	Mike Conaway
Party	Republican
Popular vote	107,268
Percentage	100.0%
U.S. Representative before election
Mike Conaway
Republican
Elected U.S. Representative
Mike Conaway
Republican

Congressman Mike Conaway (R-Midland) ran unopposed in the general election.

=== Predictions ===
Source	Ranking	As of
The Cook Political Report	Safe R	November 6, 2006
Rothenberg	Safe R	November 6, 2006
Sabato's Crystal Ball	Safe R	November 6, 2006
Real Clear Politics	Safe R	November 7, 2006
CQ Politics	Safe R	November 7, 2006

2006 U.S. House election: Texas district 11
Party	Candidate	Votes	%	±%
Republican	Mike Conaway	107,268	100	+23.2
Majority		107,268	100	
Turnout		107,268		
Republican hold		Swing	+45	

== District 12 ==
2006 Texas's 12th congressional district election
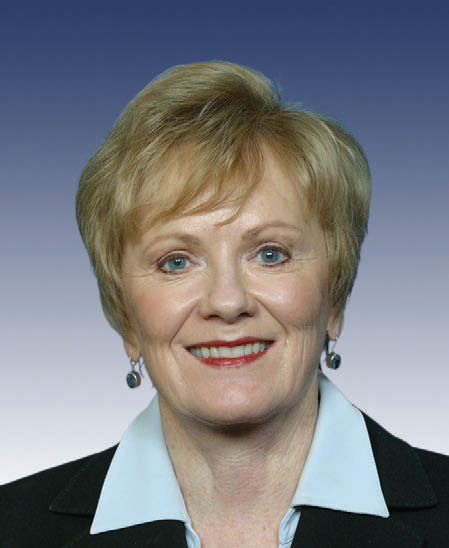

Nominee	Kay Granger	John Morris
Party	Republican	Democratic
Popular vote	98,371	45,676
Percentage	66.9%	31.1%
- County results Granger: 60–70% 70–80%
U.S. Representative before election
Kay Granger
Republican
Elected U.S. Representative
Kay Granger
Republican

Incumbent Congresswoman Kay Granger (R-Fort Worth) faced John R. Morris (D), also of Fort Worth, in the general election. Gardner Osborne received the Libertarian nomination.

=== Predictions ===
Source	Ranking	As of
The Cook Political Report	Safe R	November 6, 2006
Rothenberg	Safe R	November 6, 2006
Sabato's Crystal Ball	Safe R	November 6, 2006
Real Clear Politics	Safe R	November 7, 2006
CQ Politics	Safe R	November 7, 2006

2006 U.S. House election: Texas district 12
Party	Candidate	Votes	%	±%
Republican	Kay Granger	98,371	66.94	−5.37
Democratic	John Morris	45,676	31.08	+3.40
Libertarian	Gardner Osborne	2,888	1.96	+1.96
Majority		52,695	44.63	
Turnout		146,935		
Republican hold		Swing	−8.77	

== District 13 ==
2006 Texas's 13th congressional district election
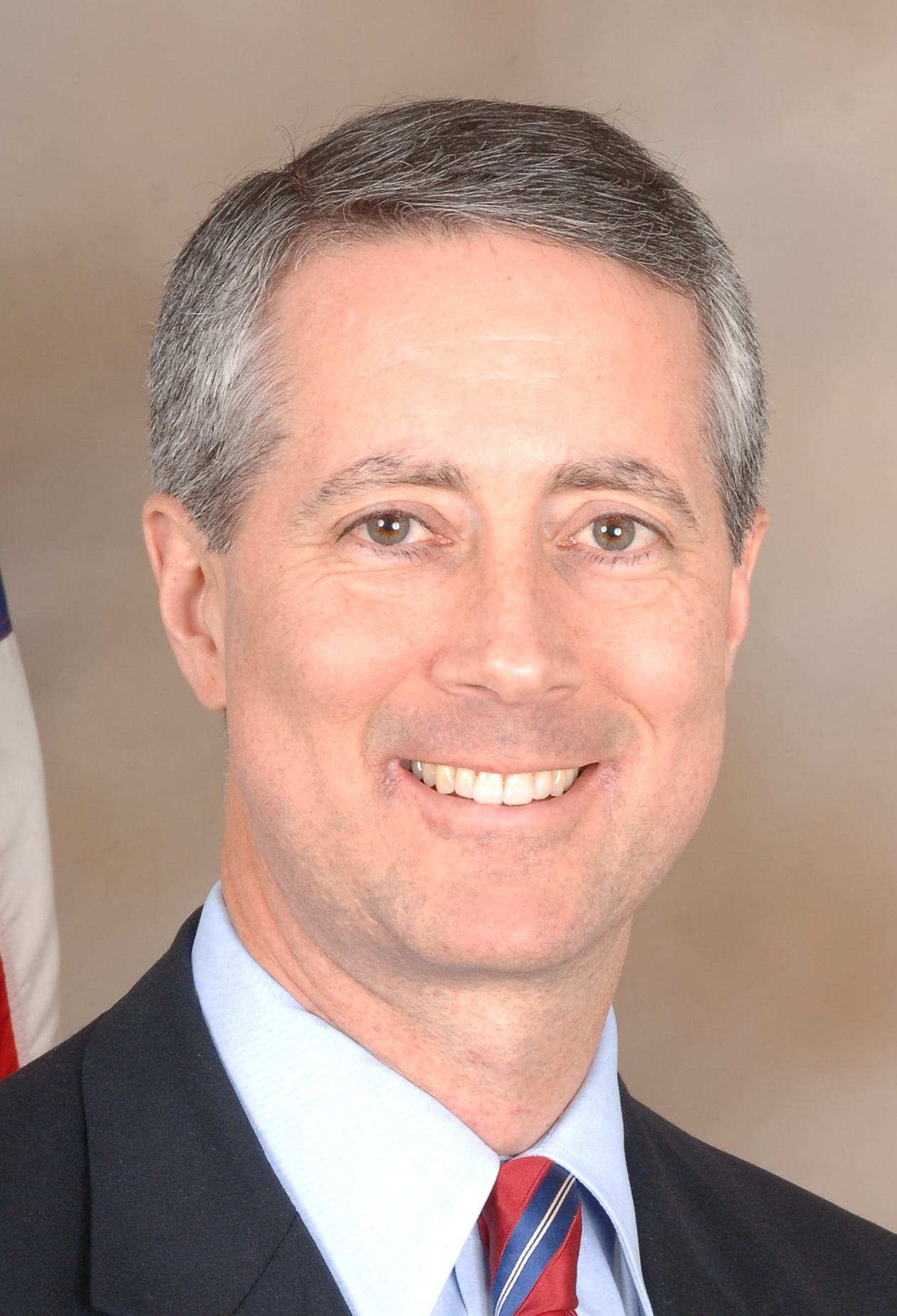

Nominee	Mac Thornberry	Roger Waun
Party	Republican	Democratic
Popular vote	108,107	33,460
Percentage	74.4%	23.0%
- County results Thornberry: 40–50% 50–60% 60–70% 70–80% 80–90% >90% Waun: 50–60%
U.S. Representative before election
Mac Thornberry
Republican
Elected U.S. Representative
Mac Thornberry
Republican

Congressman Mac Thornberry (R-Amarillo) faced Roger Waun, Democrat from Wichita Falls, in this panhandle race. Jim Thompson represented the Libertarian Party in the election.

=== Predictions ===
Source	Ranking	As of
The Cook Political Report	Safe R	November 6, 2006
Rothenberg	Safe R	November 6, 2006
Sabato's Crystal Ball	Safe R	November 6, 2006
Real Clear Politics	Safe R	November 7, 2006
CQ Politics	Safe R	November 7, 2006

2006 U.S. House election: Texas district 13
Party	Candidate	Votes	%	±%
Republican	Mac Thornberry	108,107	74.35	−17.95
Democratic	Roger Waun	33,460	23.01	+23.01
Libertarian	Jim Thompson	3,829	2.63	−5.06
Majority		74,674	51.34	
Turnout		145,396		
Republican hold		Swing	−33.27	

== District 14 ==
2006 Texas's 14th congressional district election
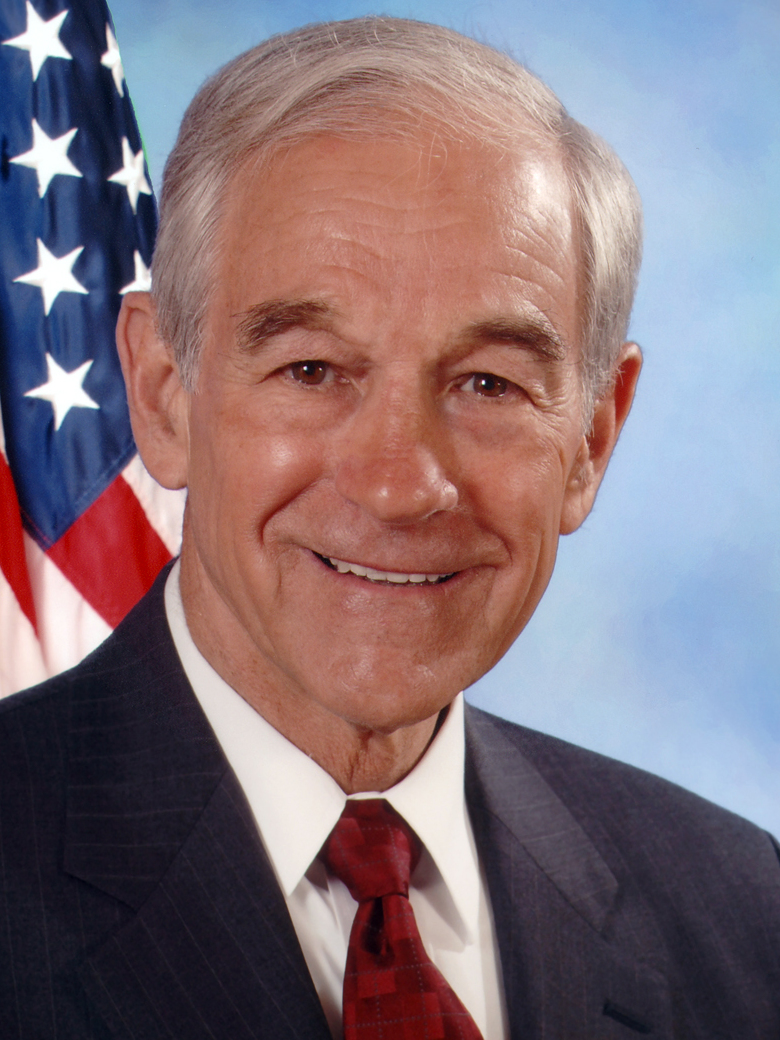

Nominee	Ron Paul	Shane Sklar
Party	Republican	Democratic
Popular vote	94,380	62,429
Percentage	60.2%	39.8%
- County results Paul: 50–60% 60–70% 70–80% Sklar: 50–60%
U.S. Representative before election
Ron Paul
Republican
Elected U.S. Representative
Ron Paul
Republican

Congressman Ron Paul, the Republican from Surfside, faced Shane Sklar, Democratic nominee from Edna, to represent this coastal district, which stretches from Victoria and stretches in a northward and eastward direction to Fort Bend and Brazoria counties.

=== Predictions ===
Source	Ranking	As of
The Cook Political Report	Safe R	November 6, 2006
Rothenberg	Safe R	November 6, 2006
Sabato's Crystal Ball	Safe R	November 6, 2006
Real Clear Politics	Safe R	November 7, 2006
CQ Politics	Safe R	November 7, 2006

2006 U.S. House election: Texas district 14
Party	Candidate	Votes	%	±%
Republican	Ron Paul	94,380	60.18	−39.81
Democratic	Shane Sklar	62,429	39.81	+39.81
Majority		31,951	20.37	
Turnout		156,809		
Republican hold		Swing	−79.63	

== District 15 ==
2006 Texas's 15th congressional district election
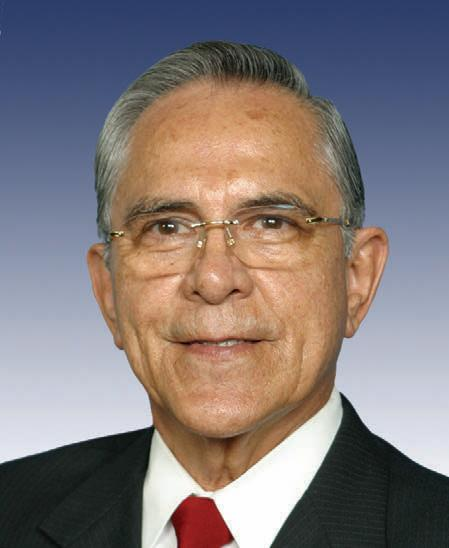

Nominee	Rubén Hinojosa	Paul Haring	Eddie Zamora
Party	Democratic	Republican	Republican
Popular vote	43,236	16,601	10,150
Percentage	61.8%	23.7%	14.5%
- County results Hinojosa: 50–60% 60–70% 70–80% 80–90% Zamora: 40–50% 50–60%
U.S. Representative before election
Rubén Hinojosa
Democratic
Elected U.S. Representative
Rubén Hinojosa
Democratic

Four-term incumbent Congressman Rubén Hinojosa (D-McAllen) ran against Republicans Paul Haring and Eddie Zamora in a special election caused by court-mandated redistricting in South Texas and the redrawing of the district's lines.

=== Predictions ===
Source	Ranking	As of
The Cook Political Report	Safe D	November 6, 2006
Rothenberg	Safe D	November 6, 2006
Sabato's Crystal Ball	Safe D	November 6, 2006
Real Clear Politics	Safe D	November 7, 2006
CQ Politics	Safe D	November 7, 2006

2006 U.S. House election: Texas district 15
Party	Candidate	Votes	%	±%
Democratic	Rubén Hinojosa	43,236	61.77	+4.01
Republican	Paul Haring Eddie Zamora	16,601; 10,150	23.72; 14.50	−2.60
Majority		26,635	38.05	
Turnout		69,987		
Democratic hold		Swing	+21.11	

== District 16 ==
2006 Texas's 16th congressional district election
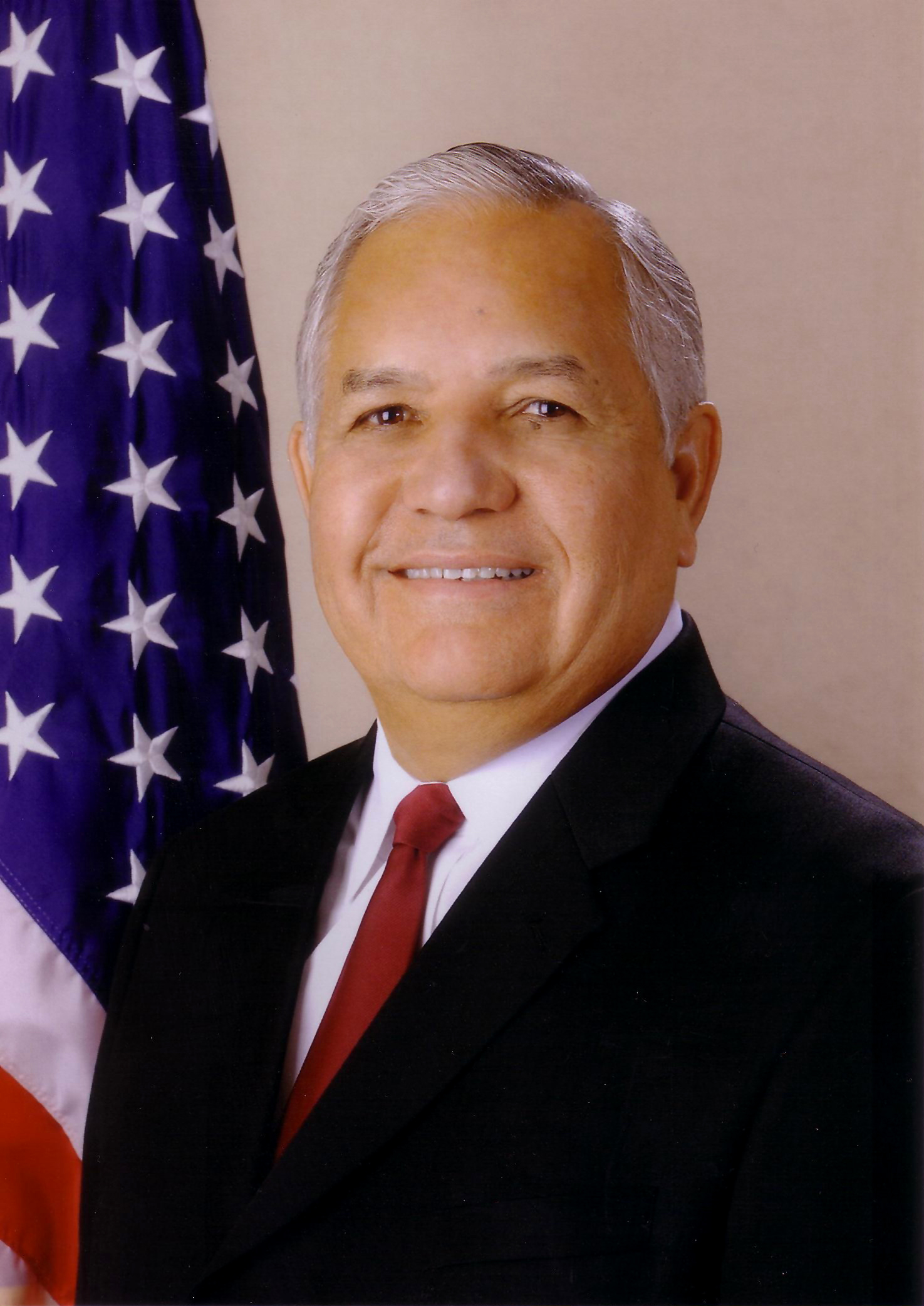

Nominee	Silvestre Reyes	Gordon Strickland
Party	Democratic	Libertarian
Popular vote	61,116	16,572
Percentage	78.7%	21.3%
- County results Reyes: 70–80%
U.S. Representative before election
Silvestre Reyes
Democratic
Elected U.S. Representative
Silvestre Reyes
Democratic

Democratic Congressman Silvestre Reyes of El Paso faced third-party opposition in the fall, in the form of Libertarian Gordon Strickland. The 16th District is heavily Democratic and comprises mainly El Paso, which is heavily Hispanic.

=== Predictions ===
Source	Ranking	As of
The Cook Political Report	Safe D	November 6, 2006
Rothenberg	Safe D	November 6, 2006
Sabato's Crystal Ball	Safe D	November 6, 2006
Real Clear Politics	Safe D	November 7, 2006
CQ Politics	Safe D	November 7, 2006

2006 U.S. House election: Texas district 16
Party	Candidate	Votes	%	±%
Democratic	Silvestre Reyes	61,116	78.67	+11.14
Libertarian	Gordon Strickland	16,572	21.33	+19.95
Majority		44,544	57.34	
Turnout		77,688		
Democratic hold		Swing	+20.89	

== District 17 ==
2006 Texas's 17th congressional district election
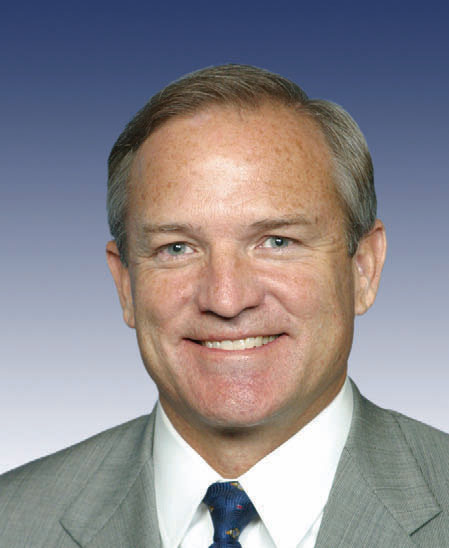

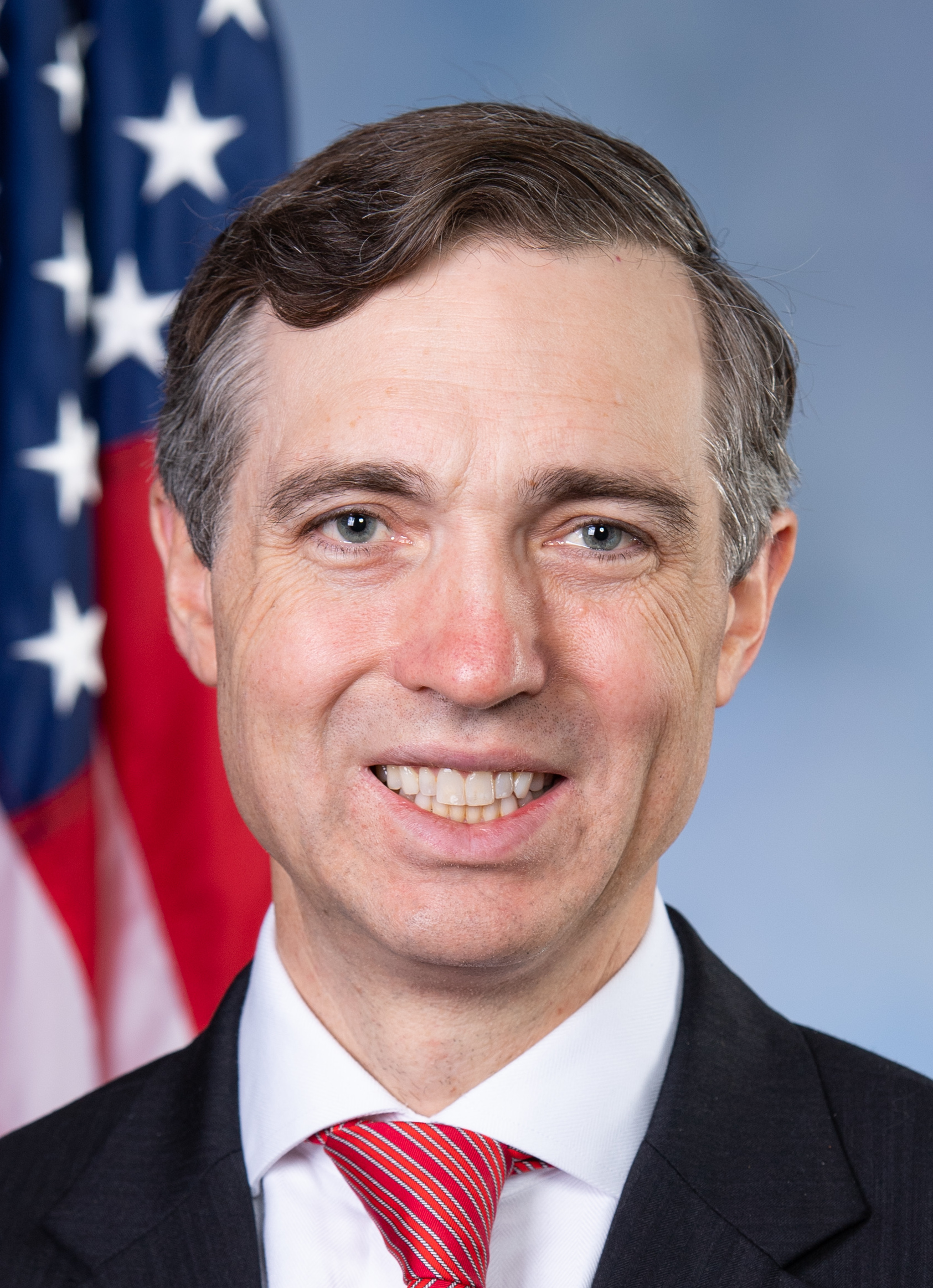
Nominee	Chet Edwards	Van Taylor
Party	Democratic	Republican
Popular vote	92,478	64,142
Percentage	58.1%	40.3%
- County results Edwards: 50–60% 60–70% 70–80% Taylor: 40–50% 50–60%
U.S. Representative before election
Chet Edwards
Democratic
Elected U.S. Representative
Chet Edwards
Democratic

Incumbent Chet Edwards (D-Waco) won reelection by a 51% to 48% margin in 2004 after the 2003 Texas redistricting changed his exurban Central Texas district substantially and made it more Republican, he also pulled off the victory despite the fact Bush won the district by a margin of 40%. His district includes Waco and Crawford, the location of George W. Bush's ranch, Prairie Chapel Ranch. With his district stretched to include his alma mater of Texas A&M University, he was able to pull off a narrow victory in 2004. He was also helped by the fact that his opponent, then-State Representative Arlene Wohlgemuth, was nominated only after a nasty, expensive primary. This year, he was challenged by Republican Van Taylor, an attorney and Iraq War veteran from a prominent family in Waco. Guillermo Acosta also ran as the Libertarian nominee.

=== Endorsements ===
Chet Edwards (D)

Individuals

- Wesley Clark, General, 2004 democratic presidential candidate

==== Predictions ====
Source	Ranking	As of
The Cook Political Report	Likely D	November 6, 2006
Rothenberg	Safe D	November 6, 2006
Sabato's Crystal Ball	Likely D	November 6, 2006
Real Clear Politics	Safe D	November 7, 2006
CQ Politics	Likely D	November 7, 2006

2006 U.S. House election: Texas district 17
Party	Candidate	Votes	%	±%
Democratic	Chet Edwards	92,478	58.12	+6.92
Republican	Van Taylor	64,142	40.31	−7.11
Libertarian	Guillermo Acosta	2,504	1.57	+0.18
Majority		28,336	17.81	
Turnout		159,124		
Democratic hold		Swing	+14.03	

== District 18 ==
2006 Texas's 18th congressional district election
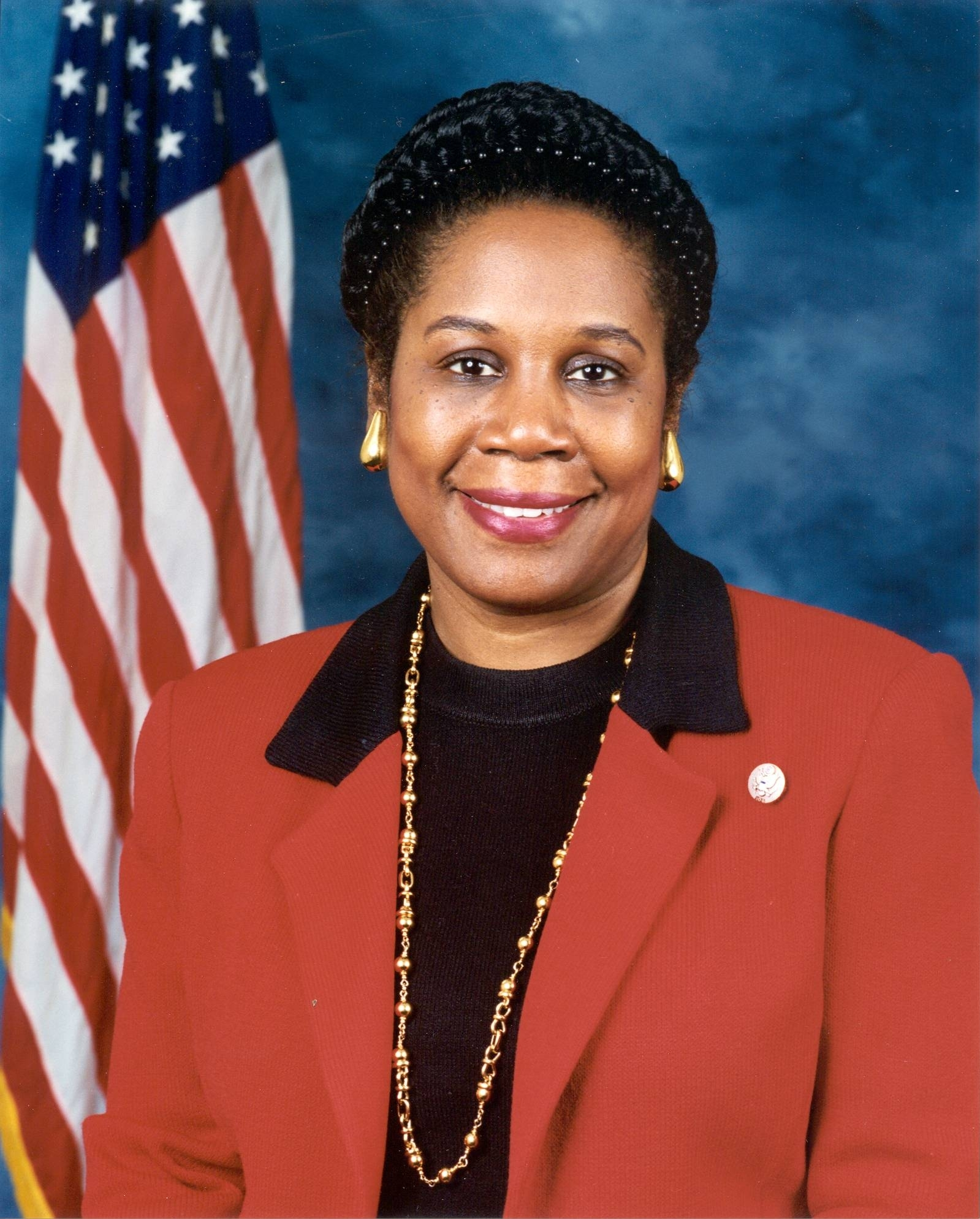

Nominee	Sheila Jackson Lee	Ahmad Hassan
Party	Democratic	Republican
Popular vote	65,936	16,448
Percentage	76.6%	19.1%
- County results Lee: 70–80%
U.S. Representative before election
Sheila Jackson Lee
Democratic
Elected U.S. Representative
Sheila Jackson Lee
Democratic

Incumbent Sheila Jackson Lee (D-Houston) faced Republican Ahmad Hassan to represent this largely Democratic and urban Congressional seat in the heart of Houston. Patrick Warren was the Libertarian nominee.

=== Predictions ===
Source	Ranking	As of
The Cook Political Report	Safe D	November 6, 2006
Rothenberg	Safe D	November 6, 2006
Sabato's Crystal Ball	Safe D	November 6, 2006
Real Clear Politics	Safe D	November 7, 2006
CQ Politics	Safe D	November 7, 2006

2006 U.S. House election: Texas district 18
Party	Candidate	Votes	%	±%
Democratic	Sheila Jackson Lee	65,936	76.62	−12.29
Republican	Ahmad Hassan	16,448	19.11	+19.11
Libertarian	Patrick Warren	3,667	4.26	−0.44
Majority		49,488	57.51	
Turnout		86,051		
Democratic hold		Swing	−25.00	

== District 19 ==
2006 Texas's 19th congressional district election
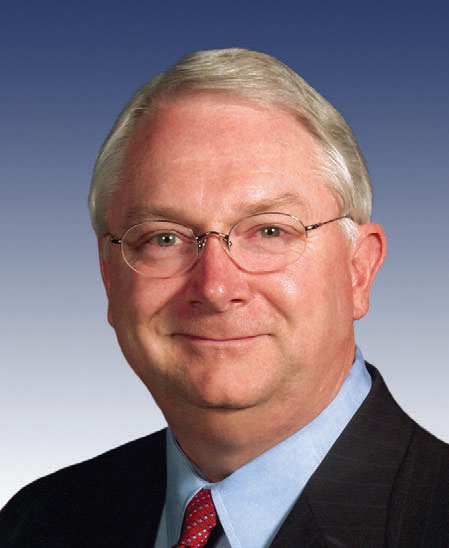

Nominee	Randy Neugebauer	Robert Ricketts
Party	Republican	Democratic
Popular vote	92,811	40,853
Percentage	67.7%	29.8%
- County results Neugebauer: 50–60% 60–70% 70–80% Ricketts: 50–60%
U.S. Representative before election
Randy Neugebauer
Republican
Elected U.S. Representative
Randy Neugebauer
Republican

Congressman Randy Neugebauer (R-Lubbock), victorious in 2004 over fellow incumbent Congressman Charlie Stenholm (D-Abilene), faced Democrat Robert Ricketts, also of Lubbock, in November. Fred Jones was on the ballot as the Libertarian nominee.

=== Predictions ===
Source	Ranking	As of
The Cook Political Report	Safe R	November 6, 2006
Rothenberg	Safe R	November 6, 2006
Sabato's Crystal Ball	Safe R	November 6, 2006
Real Clear Politics	Safe R	November 7, 2006
CQ Politics	Safe R	November 7, 2006

2006 U.S. House election: Texas district 19
Party	Candidate	Votes	%	±%
Republican	Randy Neugebauer	92,811	67.70	+9.26
Democratic	Robert Ricketts	40,853	29.77	−10.28
Libertarian	Fred Jones	3,300	2.39	+.88
Write-In	Mike Sadler	197	0.14	+0.14
Majority		48,558	37.93	
Turnout		136,964		
Republican hold		Swing	+18.39	

== District 20 ==
2006 Texas's 20th congressional district election
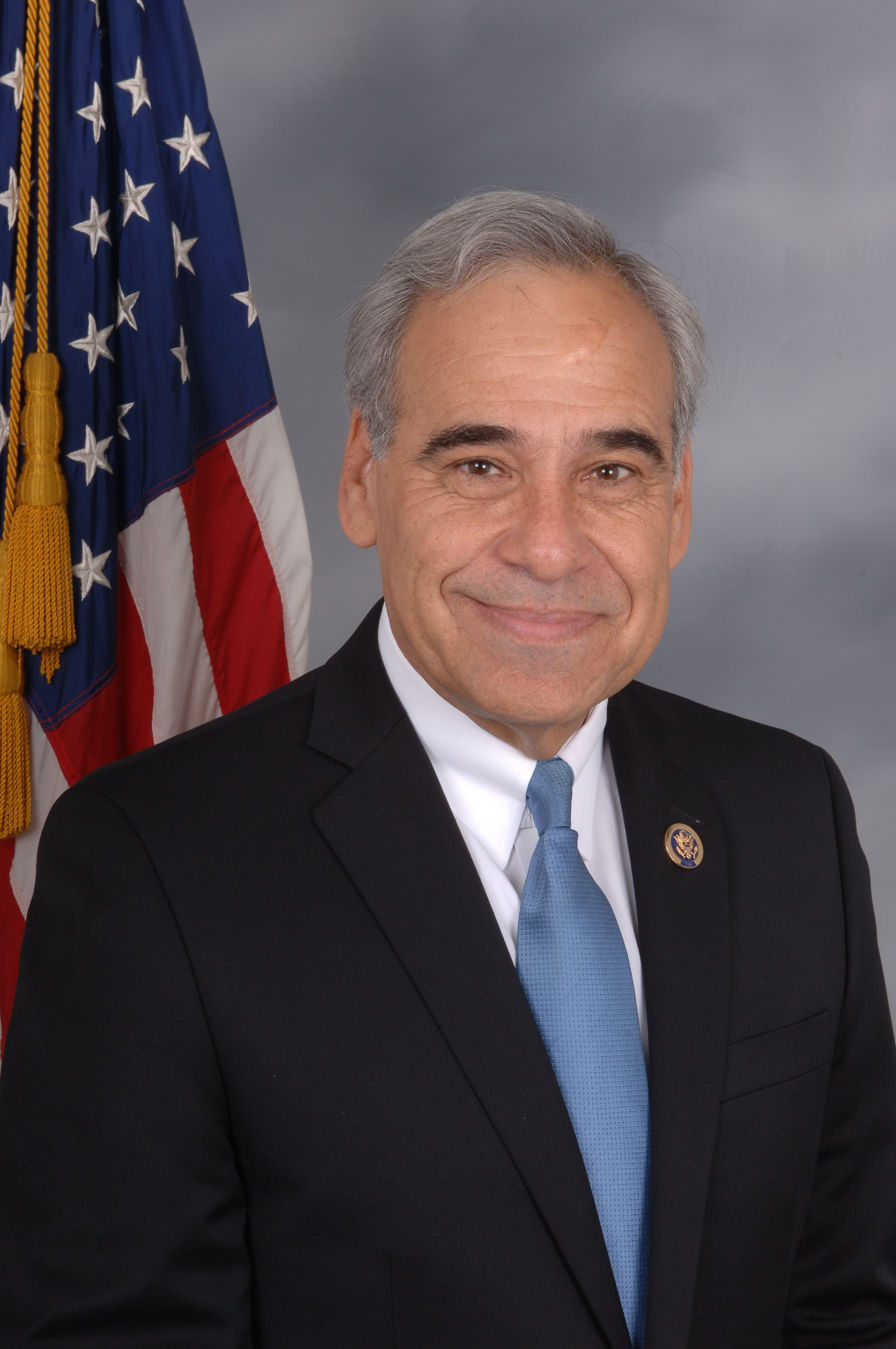

Nominee	Charles A. Gonzalez	Michael Idrogo
Party	Democratic	Libertarian
Popular vote	68,348	9,897
Percentage	87.3%	12.7%
- County results Gonzalez: 80–90%
U.S. Representative before election
Charlie Gonzalez
Democratic
Elected U.S. Representative
Charles A. Gonzalez
Democratic

Charlie Gonzalez (D-San Antonio) defended his Congressional seat against Libertarian Michael Idrogo. His district covers much of inner city San Antonio, which is mostly Hispanic.

=== Predictions ===
Source	Ranking	As of
The Cook Political Report	Safe D	November 6, 2006
Rothenberg	Safe D	November 6, 2006
Sabato's Crystal Ball	Safe D	November 6, 2006
Real Clear Politics	Safe D	November 7, 2006
CQ Politics	Safe D	November 7, 2006

2006 U.S. House election: Texas district 20
Party	Candidate	Votes	%	±%
Democratic	Charles A. Gonzalez	68,348	87.35	+22.06
Libertarian	Michael Idrogo	9,897	12.65	+11.27
Majority		58451	74.88	
Turnout		78,245		
Democratic hold		Swing	+41.41	

== District 21 ==
2006 Texas's 21st congressional district election
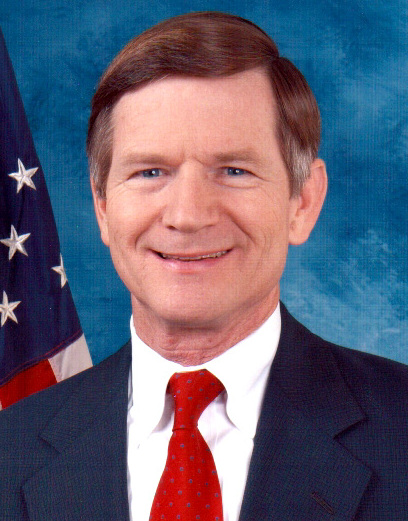

Nominee	Lamar Smith	John Courage	Gene Kelly
Party	Republican	Democratic	Democratic
Popular vote	122,486	49,957	18,355
Percentage	60.1%	24.5%	9.0%
- County results Smith: 40–50% 50–60% 60–70% 70–80%
U.S. Representative before election
Lamar S. Smith
Republican
Elected U.S. Representative
Lamar S. Smith
Republican

Lamar S. Smith (R-San Antonio) was running against San Antonio Democrat John Courage in the general election, along with James Arthur Strohm, the Libertarian nominee. The district was changed somewhat in the federal court remapping mandated by the Supreme Court and attracted several new candidates for the special election ensued as a result of the boundary change after the party primaries took place. Candidates included Democratic perennial candidate Gene Kelly, along with Independent candidates Tommy Calvert, James Lyle Peterson, and Mark Rossano. Smith won a majority of votes and avoided a December runoff.

=== Predictions ===
Source	Ranking	As of
The Cook Political Report	Safe R	November 6, 2006
Rothenberg	Safe R	November 6, 2006
Sabato's Crystal Ball	Safe R	November 6, 2006
Real Clear Politics	Safe R	November 7, 2006
CQ Politics	Safe R	November 7, 2006

2006 U.S. House election: Texas district 21
Party	Candidate	Votes	%	±%
Republican	Lamar Smith	122,486	60.11	−1.40
Democratic	John Courage	49,957	24.51	
Democratic	Gene Kelly	18,355	9.01	
Independent	Tommy Calvert	5,280	2.59	
Libertarian	James Arthur Strohm	4,076	2.00	−1.00
Independent	James Lyle Peterson	2,189	1.07	
Independent	Mark Rossano	1,439	0.71	
Majority		72,529	35.60	
Turnout		203,782		
Republican hold		Swing	−1.4	

== District 22 ==
2006 Texas's 22nd congressional district election
- November 7, 2006
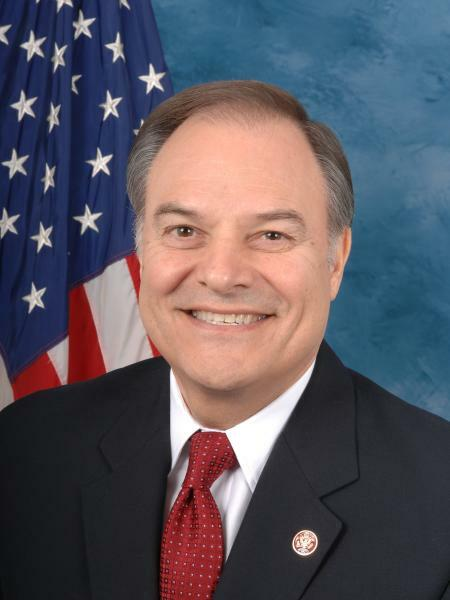

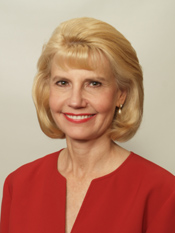

Nominee	Nick Lampson	Shelley Sekula-Gibbs (write-in)	Bob Smither
Party	Democratic	Republican	Libertarian
Popular vote	76,775	61,938	9,009
Percentage	51.8%	41.8%	6.1%
County results
Lampson
40–50%
50–60%
60–70%
U.S. Representative before election
Tom DeLay
Republican
Elected U.S. Representative
Nick Lampson
Democratic

Retiring incumbent Tom DeLay (R-Sugar Land) had been facing mounting ethical challenges and corruption charges in recent months, and won reelection by a surprisingly small 55% to 41% margin in 2004, even though George W. Bush carried the suburban Houston district with 64%. On September 28, 2005, DeLay was indicted by a grand jury in Travis County. As a result, he felt forced to step down from his post as House Majority Leader. In announcing his plans not to seek reelection, Delay noted his poor poll showing and the constant criticisms he was expecting. DeLay declared himself ineligible for the race on Tuesday, April 4 by attempting to officially change his residence to Virginia. "Those polls showed him beating Democrat Nick Lampson in the general election but in a race that would be too close for comfort, DeLay said." The Galveston County Daily News National, World and Business News | Reuters.com.

DeLay's district faced a strong challenge from former Rep. Nick Lampson, a Democrat whose district he dismantled during the 2003 mid-decade redistricting. Lampson's former district contained much of the eastern area of DeLay's present district.

Libertarian Bob Smither also ran for the 22nd district of Texas. The Republican nomination to replace DeLay was prevented by a court ruling that mandated that DeLay could not be replaced on the ballot. As a result, Texas Attorney General Greg Abbott, who previously sent out telephone calls encouraging Republicans to vote for DeLay in the primary, called for DeLay's name to be removed from the ballot and replaced with another GOP candidate. The court order was upheld by a panel of the Fifth Circuit Court and appeal to the Supreme Court refused by Justice Antonin Scalia. DeLay then filed to withdraw his name from the ballot to allow the GOP to rally behind another candidate.

The Texas GOP then decided to attempt to rally behind a write-in candidate, choosing Houston City Councilwoman Shelley Sekula-Gibbs during a meeting of precinct chairs in the 22nd district on August 17. The presumed favorite before the denial of the appeal, Sugar Land mayor David Wallace, filed as a write-in candidate with the Texas Secretary of State before the meeting, vowing to run even without the support of the GOP. Sekula-Gibbs picked as write-in candidate

=== Endorsements ===
Nick Lampson (D)

Individuals

- Wesley Clark, General, 2004 democratic presidential candidate

==== Predictions ====
Source	Ranking	As of
The Cook Political Report	Tossup	November 6, 2006
Rothenberg	Tossup	November 6, 2006
Sabato's Crystal Ball	Tilt D (flip)	November 6, 2006
Real Clear Politics	Lean D (flip)	November 7, 2006
CQ Politics	Lean D (flip)	November 7, 2006

US House election, 2006: Texas district 22
Party	Candidate	Votes	%	±%
Democratic	Nick Lampson	76,775	51.79%	
Republican	Shelley Sekula-Gibbs (write-in)	61,938	41.78%	
Libertarian	Bob Smither	9,009	6.08%	
Republican	Don Richardson (write-in)	428	0.29%	
Independent	Joe Reasbeck (write-in)	89	0.06%	
Majority		14,817	10.01%	
Turnout		148,239		
Democratic gain from Republican		Swing		

== District 23 ==
2006 Texas's 23rd congressional district election
- November 7, 2006 (first round); December 12, 2006 (runoff election)
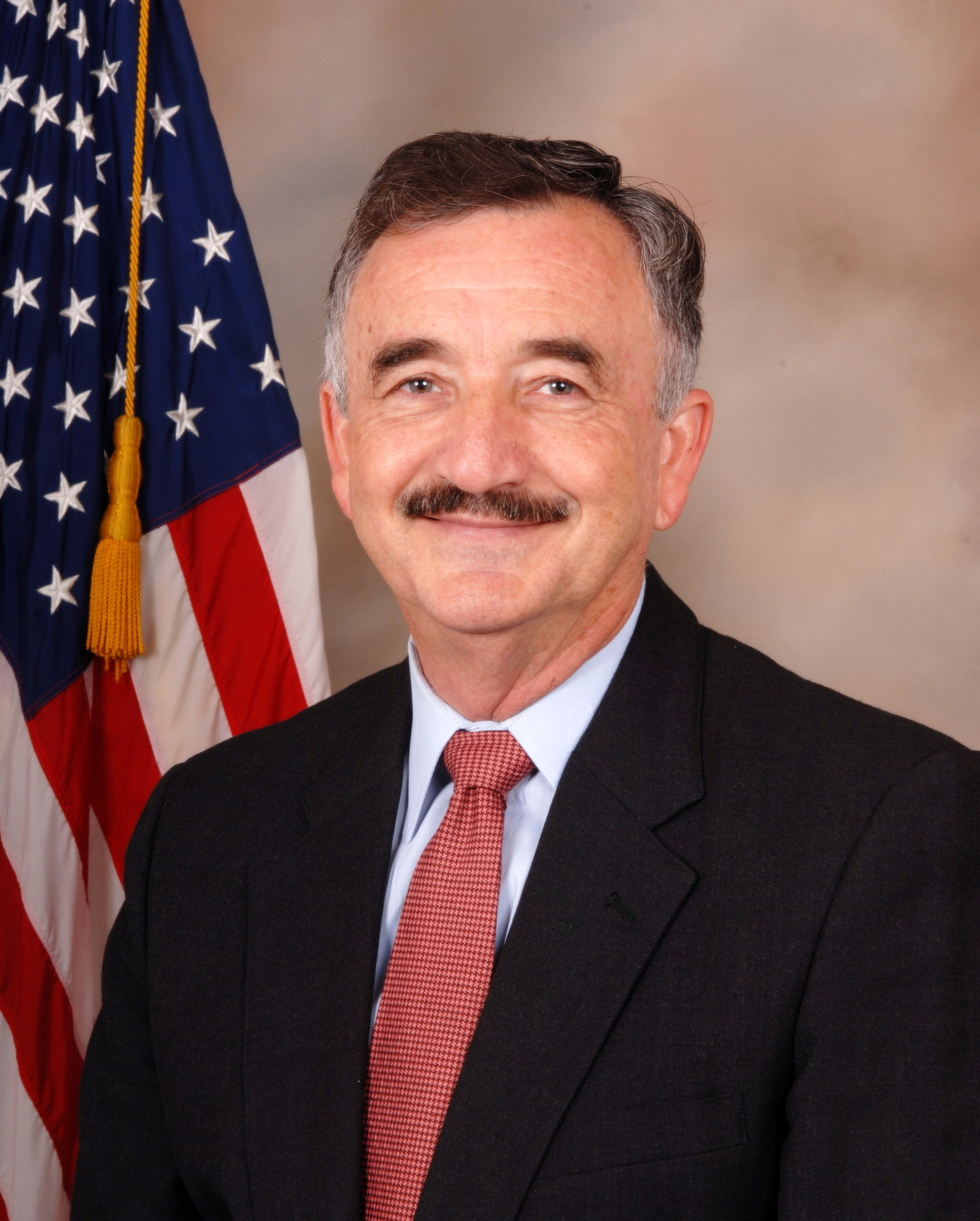

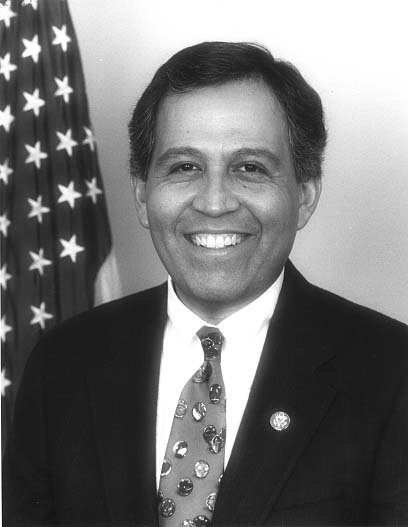
Nominee	Ciro Rodriguez	Henry Bonilla
Party	Democratic	Republican
Popular vote	38,256	32,217
Percentage	54.3%	45.7%
- Runoff county results Rodriguez: 50–60% 60–70% 70–80% 80–90% Bonilla: 50–60% 60–70% 70–80%
U.S. Representative before election
Henry Bonilla
Republican
Elected U.S. Representative
Ciro Rodriguez
Democratic

The 23rd district was among five districts holding a special election on November 7, the same day as the general election. The race pitted all certified candidates against one another in each district, regardless of party.

The reason for this arrangement stems from the controversial 2003 Texas redistricting plan which was ruled unconstitutional with respect to the 23rd district by the Supreme Court in League of United Latin American Citizens v. Perry. The Court ruled that the plan was a racial gerrymander; specifically that it lowered the Hispanic population percentage in the district to the extent that it unconstitutionally diminished the constituency's political influence. The 23rd had to be redrawn, and, in all, five districts were affected, and all primary results from those districts were vacated. The new lines affected mostly the 23rd and 28th districts.

The incumbent in the 23rd was Congressman Henry Bonilla (R-San Antonio). His opponent originally was Rick Bolanos, 57, Democrat from El Paso, who was to be Bonilla's challenger before the district was redrawn and forced the new elections. As redrawn, however, Bonilla's district included the home of Democratic ex-Congressman Ciro Rodriguez, who jumped into the race, after losing his primary challenge against Henry Cuellar in the 28th district.

=== Endorsements ===
Ciro Rodriguez (D)

Individuals

- Wesley Clark, General, 2004 democratic presidential candidate

==== Predictions ====
Source	Ranking	As of
The Cook Political Report	Lean R	November 6, 2006
Rothenberg	Lean R	November 6, 2006
Sabato's Crystal Ball	Lean R	November 6, 2006
Real Clear Politics	Safe R	November 7, 2006
CQ Politics	Likely R	November 7, 2006

2006 U.S. House election: Texas district 23
Party	Candidate	Votes	%	±%
Republican	Henry Bonilla (incumbent)	60,147	48.46	
Democratic	Ciro Rodriguez	24,953	20.10	
Democratic	Albert Uresti	14,529	11.70	
Democratic	Lukin Gilliland	13,725	11.05	
Independent	Craig Stephens	3,344	2.69	
Democratic	Augie Beltran	2,650	2.13	
Democratic	Rick Bolanos	2,563	2.06	
Democratic	Adrian DeLeon	2,198	1.77	
Turnout		124,198		

District 23's election was the only one to advance to a runoff, which was held on December 12.

2006 U.S. House run-off election: Texas district 23
Party	Candidate	Votes	%	±%
Democratic	Ciro Rodriguez	38,256	54.28%	+25.1
Republican	Henry Bonilla (incumbent)	32,217	45.72%	−23.9
Majority		6,082	8.64%	
Turnout		70,473		
Democratic gain from Republican		Swing	24.5	

== District 24 ==
2006 Texas's 24th congressional district election
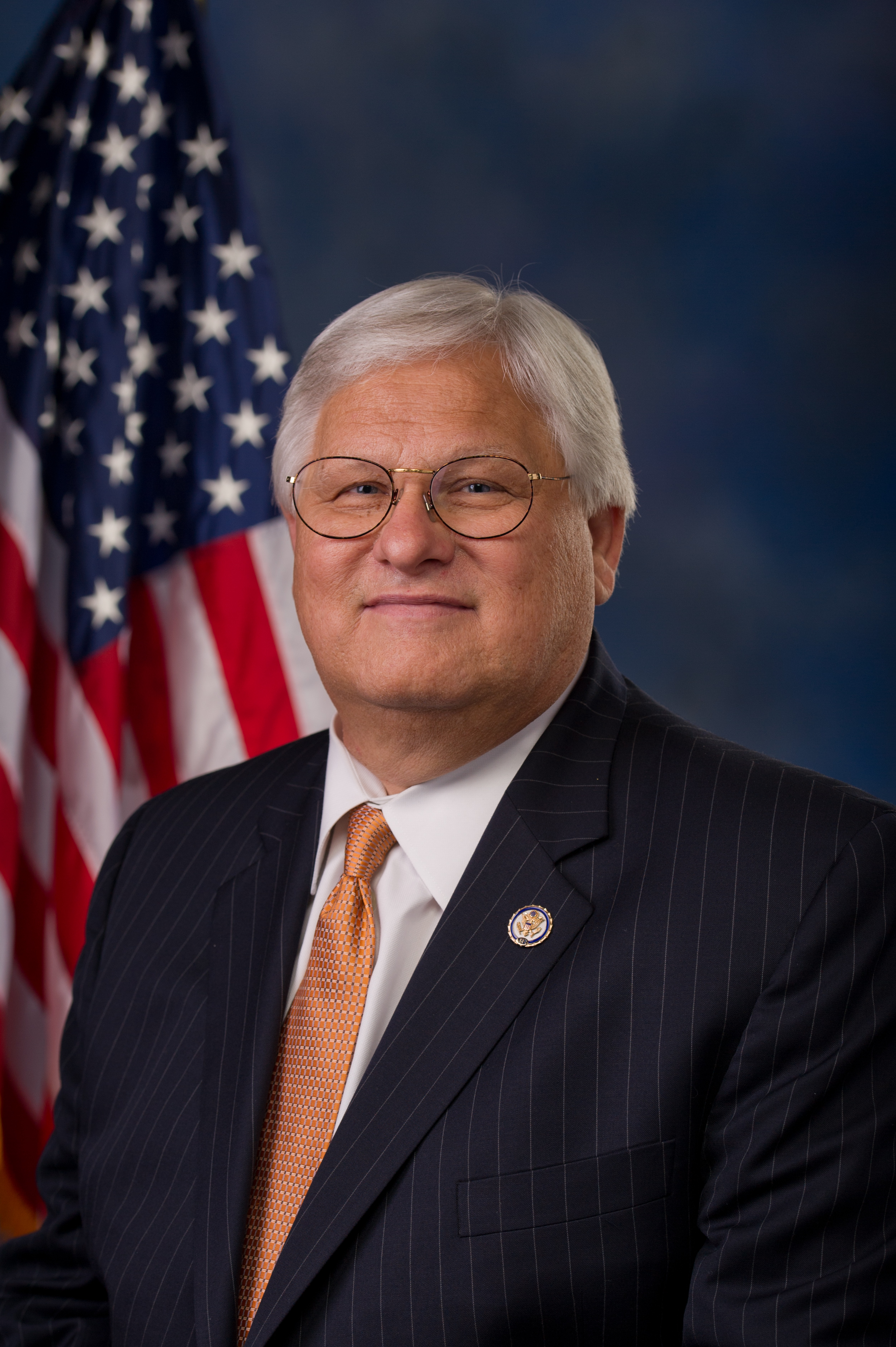

Nominee	Kenny Marchant	Gary Page
Party	Republican	Democratic
Popular vote	83,620	51,833
Percentage	60.0%	37.0%
- County results Marchant: 50–60% 60–70%
U.S. Representative before election
Kenny Marchant
Republican
Elected U.S. Representative
Kenny Marchant
Republican

Incumbent Kenny Marchant (R-Coppell), ran to keep his seat in Congress against Democrat Gary Page of Irving and the Libertarian nominee Mark Frohman.

=== Predictions ===
Source	Ranking	As of
The Cook Political Report	Safe R	November 6, 2006
Rothenberg	Safe R	November 6, 2006
Sabato's Crystal Ball	Safe R	November 6, 2006
Real Clear Politics	Safe R	November 7, 2006
CQ Politics	Safe R	November 7, 2006

2006 U.S. House election: Texas district 24
Party	Candidate	Votes	%	±%
Republican	Kenny Marchant	83,620	60.0	
Democratic	Gary Page	51,833	37.0	
Libertarian	Mark Frohman	4,211	3.0	
Republican hold		Swing	−7.10	

== District 25 ==
2006 Texas's 25th congressional district election
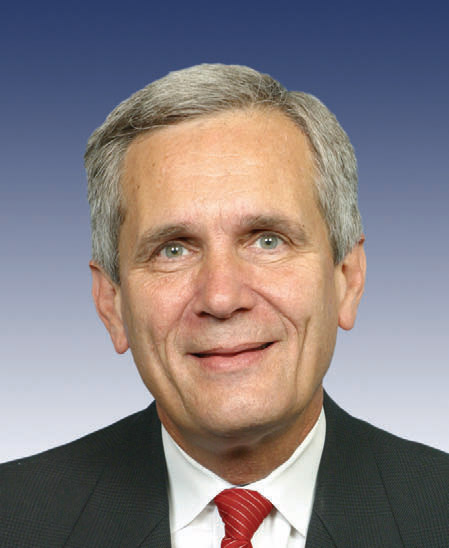

Nominee	Lloyd Doggett	Grant Rostig
Party	Democratic	Republican
Popular vote	109,911	42,975
Percentage	67.3%	26.3%
- County results Doggett: 50–60% 60–70% 70–80%
U.S. Representative before election
Lloyd Doggett
Democratic
Elected U.S. Representative
Lloyd Doggett
Democratic

Incumbent Congressman Lloyd Doggett (D-Austin) originally was slated to have no major party opposition in the fall. The 25th district formerly stretched from Austin to the Mexican border, but has been redrawn for the 110th Congress to be more compact and completely in the central part of the state.

As this district was redrawn after the party primaries took place, a special election ensued in November, meaning that instead of a plurality required for victory, a majority was required. If no candidate received a majority, the top two contenders would meet in a runoff election in December. He was opposed by Republican Grant Rostig, Libertarian Barbara Cunningham, and Independent Brian Parrett.

=== Predictions ===
Source	Ranking	As of
The Cook Political Report	Safe D	November 6, 2006
Rothenberg	Safe D	November 6, 2006
Sabato's Crystal Ball	Safe D	November 6, 2006
Real Clear Politics	Safe D	November 7, 2006
CQ Politics	Safe D	November 7, 2006

2006 U.S. House election: Texas district 25
Party	Candidate	Votes	%	±%
Democratic	Lloyd Doggett	109,911	67.26	−0.34
Republican	Grant Rostig	42,975	26.30	−4.44
Libertarian	Barbara Cunningham	6,942	4.25	+2.59
Independent	Brian Parrett	3,596	2.20	+2.20
Majority		66,936	40.96	
Turnout		163,424		
Democratic hold		Swing	+4.10	

== District 26 ==
2006 Texas's 26th congressional district election
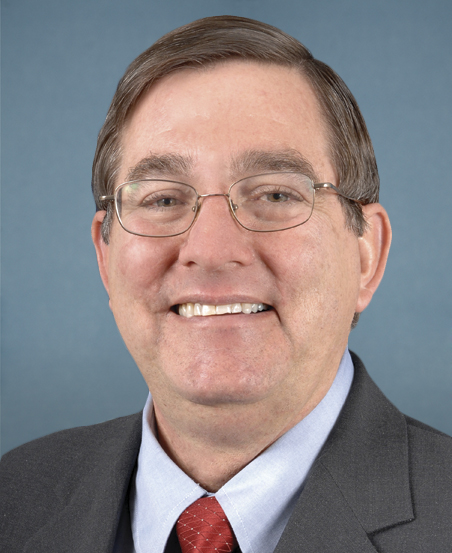

Nominee	Michael C. Burgess	Tim Barnwell
Party	Republican	Democratic
Popular vote	94,219	58,271
Percentage	60.2%	37.2%
- County results Burgess: 40–50% 60–70% 70–80%
U.S. Representative before election
Michael C. Burgess
Republican
Elected U.S. Representative
Michael C. Burgess
Republican

Congressman Michael C. Burgess (R-Lewisville) was challenged by Democrat Tim Barnwell of Denton, along with Libertarian Rich Haas. The Denton County-centered district is strongly Republican.

=== Predictions ===
Source	Ranking	As of
The Cook Political Report	Safe R	November 6, 2006
Rothenberg	Safe R	November 6, 2006
Sabato's Crystal Ball	Safe R	November 6, 2006
Real Clear Politics	Safe R	November 7, 2006
CQ Politics	Safe R	November 7, 2006

2006 U.S. House election: Texas district 26
Party	Candidate	Votes	%	±%
Republican	Michael C. Burgess	94,219	60.21	−5.54
Democratic	Tim Barnwell	58,271	37.24	+4.53
Libertarian	Rich Haas	3,993	2.55	+1.02
Majority		35,948	22.97	
Turnout		156,483		
Republican hold		Swing	−10.07	

== District 27 ==
2006 Texas's 27th congressional district election
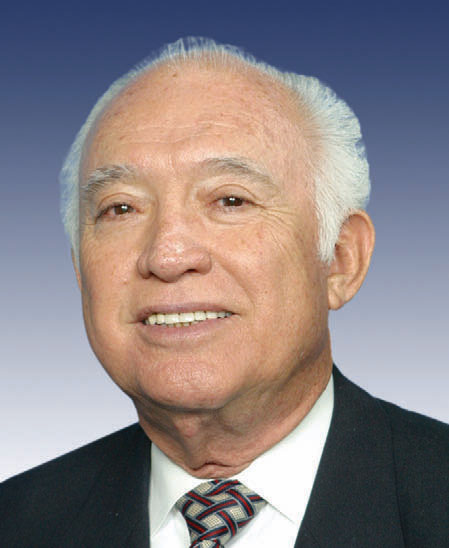

Nominee	Solomon Ortiz	William Vaden
Party	Democratic	Republican
Popular vote	62,058	42,975
Percentage	56.8%	38.9%
- County results Ortiz: 50–60% 60–70% 70–80% Vaden: 50–60%
U.S. Representative before election
Solomon Ortiz
Democratic
Elected U.S. Representative
Solomon Ortiz
Democratic

Incumbent Solomon P. Ortiz (D-Corpus Christi) ran for reelection against Republican William Vaden, also of Corpus Christi. They were joined on the ballot by Libertarian Robert Powell.

=== Predictions ===
Source	Ranking	As of
The Cook Political Report	Safe D	November 6, 2006
Rothenberg	Safe D	November 6, 2006
Sabato's Crystal Ball	Safe D	November 6, 2006
Real Clear Politics	Safe D	November 7, 2006
CQ Politics	Safe D	November 7, 2006

2006 U.S. House election: Texas district 27
Party	Candidate	Votes	%	±%
Democratic	Solomon P. Ortiz	62,058	56.77	−6.36
Republican	William Vaden	42,538	38.91	+4.01
Libertarian	Robert Powell	4,718	4.32	+2.35
Majority		19,520	17.86	
Turnout		109,314		
Democratic hold		Swing	−10.37	

== District 28 ==
2006 Texas's 28th congressional district election
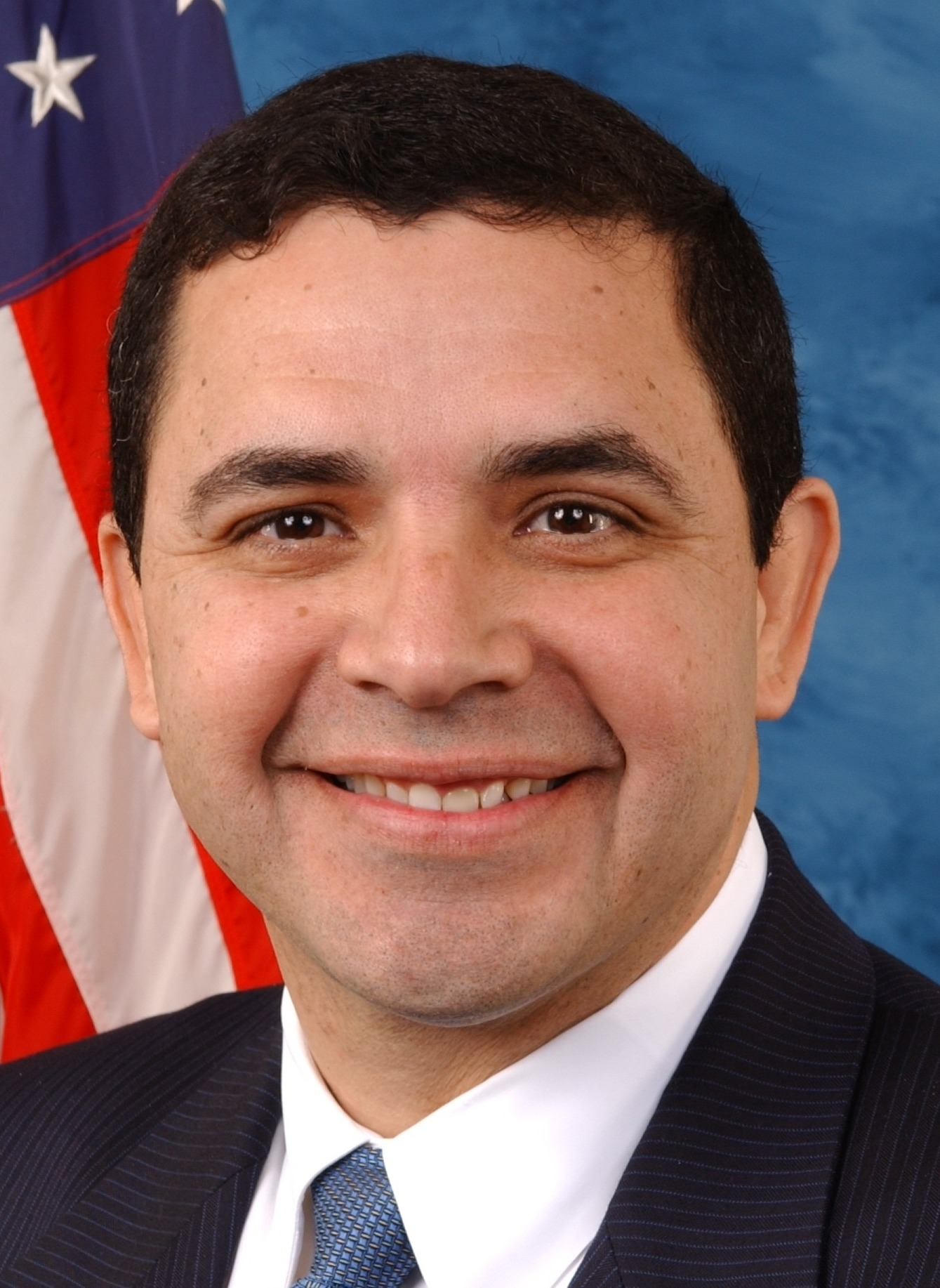
Nominee	Henry Cuellar	Frank Enriquez	Ron Avery
Party	Democratic	Democratic	Constitution
Popular vote	52,574	15,798	9,383
Percentage	67.6%	20.3%	12.1%
- County results Cuellar: 50–60% 60–70% 70–80% 80–90% Enriquez: 50–60%
U.S. Representative before election
Henry Cuellar
Democratic
Elected U.S. Representative
Henry Cuellar
Democratic

Congressman Henry Cuellar (D-Laredo) had no opposition from Republicans in November. However, a recent Supreme Court ruling struck down Texas' 23rd District, which is located next to this district, as an unconstitutional racial gerrymander resulting from the controversial 2003 Texas redistricting efforts coordinated by House Majority Leader Tom DeLay and the Republican-controlled legislature.

Cuellar's power base in Laredo was consolidated in the resulting remap and thus will not face Congressman Bonilla, as had been speculated as a scenario. This election was a special election, as the district was drawn after the party primaries, and Cuellar faced fellow Democrat Frank Enriquez and Constitution Party candidate Ron Avery. The Libertarian nominee did not re-file to run in the special election.

=== Predictions ===
Source	Ranking	As of
The Cook Political Report	Safe D	November 6, 2006
Rothenberg	Safe D	November 6, 2006
Sabato's Crystal Ball	Safe D	November 6, 2006
Real Clear Politics	Safe D	November 7, 2006
CQ Politics	Safe D	November 7, 2006

2006 U.S. House election: Texas district 28
Party	Candidate	Votes	%	±%
Democratic	Henry Cuellar	52,574	67.61	+8.60
Democratic	Frank Enriquez	15,798	20.32	+20.32
Constitution	Ron Avery	9,383	12.07	+12.07
Majority		36,776	47.29	
Turnout		77,755		
Democratic hold		Swing	+26.88	

== District 29 ==
2006 Texas's 29th congressional district election
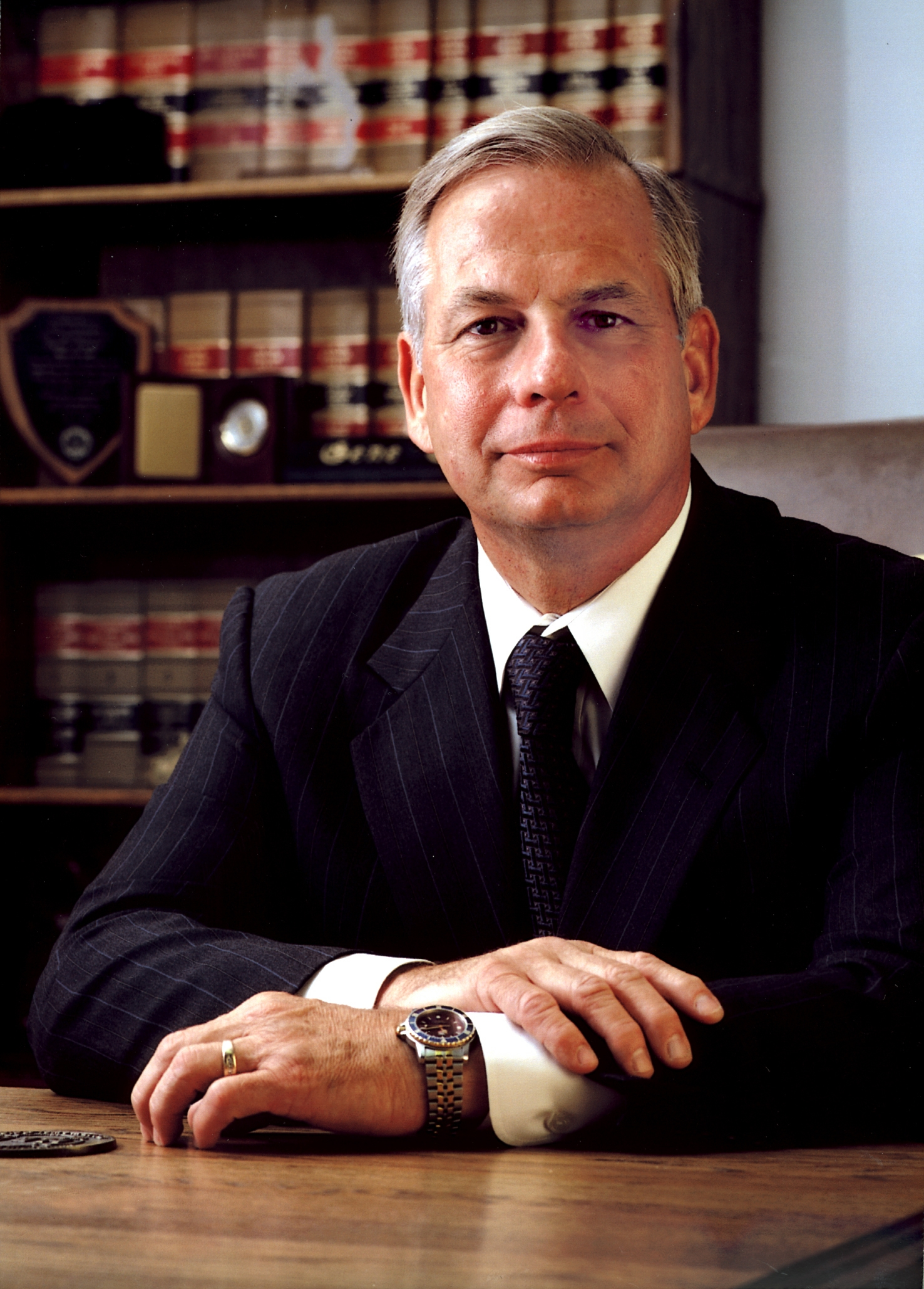

Nominee	Gene Green	Eric Story
Party	Democratic	Republican
Popular vote	37,174	12,347
Percentage	73.5%	24.4%
- County results Green: 70–80%
U.S. Representative before election
Gene Green
Democratic
Elected U.S. Representative
Gene Green
Democratic

Congressman Gene Green (D-Houston) ran against Republican Eric Story, also of Houston, in the November general election. Clifford Lee Messina, a Libertarian, rounded out the ballot. This district contains several heavily Hispanic neighborhoods in inner-city Houston, as well as several blue-collar eastern suburbs of Houston, including Pasadena, Channelview and Baytown, which are home to a strong majority of the Houston area's petrochemical refineries.

=== Predictions ===
Source	Ranking	As of
The Cook Political Report	Safe D	November 6, 2006
Rothenberg	Safe D	November 6, 2006
Sabato's Crystal Ball	Safe D	November 6, 2006
Real Clear Politics	Safe D	November 7, 2006
CQ Politics	Safe D	November 7, 2006

2006 U.S. House election: Texas district 29
Party	Candidate	Votes	%	±%
Democratic	Gene Green	37,174	73.54	−20.60
Republican	Eric Story	12,347	24.43	+24.43
Libertarian	Clifford Lee Messina	1,029	2.04	−3.82
Majority		24,827	49.11	
Turnout		50,550		
Democratic hold		Swing	−39.17	

== District 30 ==
2006 Texas's 30th congressional district election
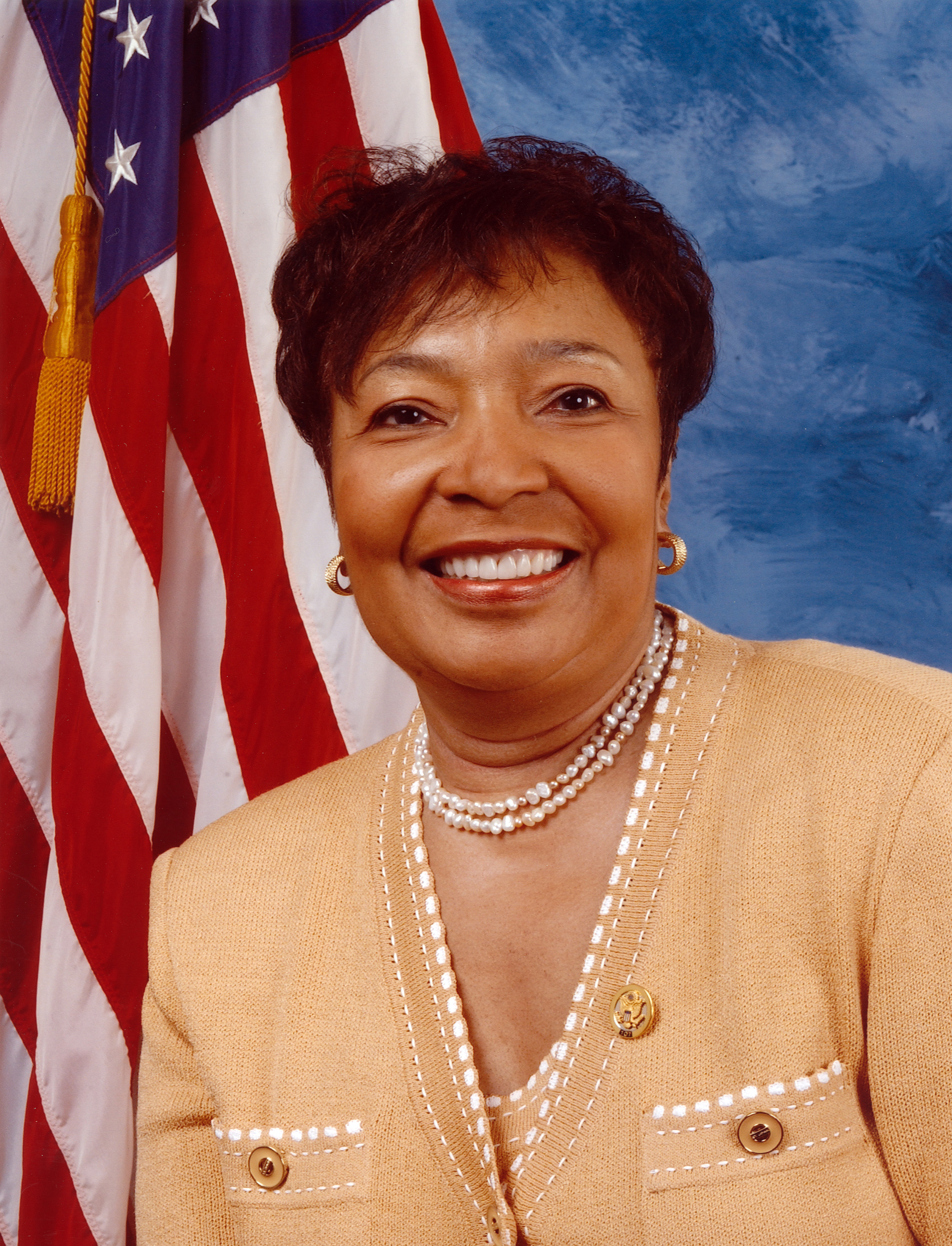

Nominee	Eddie Bernice Johnson	Wilson Aurbach
Party	Democratic	Republican
Popular vote	81,212	17,820
Percentage	80.2%	17.6%
- County results Johnson: 80–90%
U.S. Representative before election
Eddie Bernice Johnson
Democratic
Elected U.S. Representative
Eddie Bernice Johnson
Democratic

Incumbent Congresswoman Eddie Bernice Johnson (D-Dallas) faced Republican Wilson Aurbach in the general election, along with Ken Ashby, the Libertarian nominee. The 30th District contains the southern and downtown portions of Dallas, as well as several of its inner southern suburbs. It is heavily Democratic.

=== Predictions ===
Source	Ranking	As of
The Cook Political Report	Safe D	November 6, 2006
Rothenberg	Safe D	November 6, 2006
Sabato's Crystal Ball	Safe D	November 6, 2006
Real Clear Politics	Safe D	November 7, 2006
CQ Politics	Safe D	November 7, 2006

2006 U.S. House election: Texas district 30
Party	Candidate	Votes	%	±%
Democratic	Eddie Bernice Johnson	81,212	80.19	−12.84
Republican	Wilson Aurbach	17,820	17.60	+17.60
Libertarian	Ken Ashby	2,245	2.22	−4.75
Majority		63,392	62.59	
Turnout		101,277		
Democratic hold		Swing	−23.47	

== District 31 ==
2006 Texas's 31st congressional district election
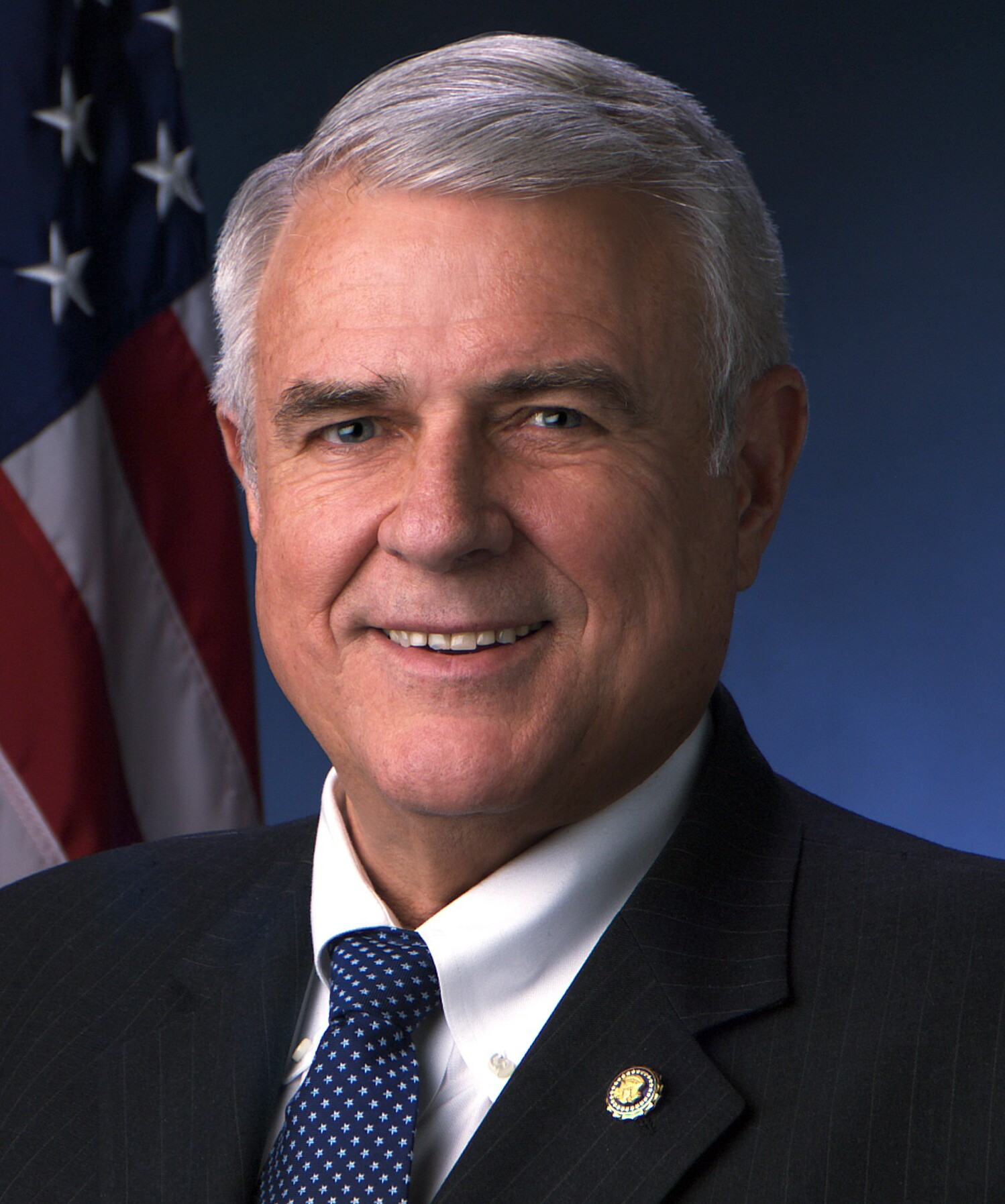

Nominee	John Carter	Mary Beth Harrell
Party	Republican	Democratic
Popular vote	90,869	60,293
Percentage	58.5%	38.8%
- County results Carter: 50–60% 60–70%
U.S. Representative before election
John Carter
Republican
Elected U.S. Representative
John Carter
Republican

Congressman John Carter (R-Round Rock) defended his Central Texas Congressional seat in November against Democrat Mary Beth Harrell of Gatesville and Libertarian Matt McAdoo. The largely Republican district consists of many northern Austin suburbs as well as the gigantic Fort Hood military base.

=== Endorsements ===
Mary Beth Harrell(D)

Individuals

- Wesley Clark, General, 2004 democratic presidential candidate

==== Predictions ====
Source	Ranking	As of
The Cook Political Report	Safe R	November 6, 2006
Rothenberg	Safe R	November 6, 2006
Sabato's Crystal Ball	Safe R	November 6, 2006
Real Clear Politics	Safe R	November 7, 2006
CQ Politics	Safe R	November 7, 2006

2006 U.S. House election: Texas district 31
Party	Candidate	Votes	%	±%
Republican	John Carter	90,869	58.48	−6.29
Democratic	Mary Beth Harrell	60,293	38.80	+6.35
Libertarian	Matt McAdoo	4,221	2.72	−0.06
Majority		30,576	19.68	
Turnout		155,383		
Republican hold		Swing	−12.64	

== District 32 ==
2006 Texas's 32nd congressional district election

Nominee	Pete Sessions	Will Pryor
Party	Republican	Democratic
Popular vote	71,461	52,269
Percentage	56.5%	41.3%
- County results Sessions: 50–60%
U.S. Representative before election
Pete Sessions
Republican
Elected U.S. Representative
Pete Sessions
Republican

Incumbent Pete Sessions (R-Dallas), who defeated longtime Democratic Congressman and fellow incumbent Martin Frost in a contentious reelection in the 2004 redistricting aftermath, faced Democrat Will Pryor for the right to represent this suburban Dallas district. Joining the two was Libertarian John Hawley.

=== Endorsements ===
Will Pryor (D)

Individuals

- Wesley Clark, General, 2004 democratic presidential candidate

==== Predictions ====
Source	Ranking	As of
The Cook Political Report	Safe R	November 6, 2006
Rothenberg	Safe R	November 6, 2006
Sabato's Crystal Ball	Safe R	November 6, 2006
Real Clear Politics	Safe R	November 7, 2006
CQ Politics	Safe R	November 7, 2006

2006 U.S. House election: Texas district 32
Party	Candidate	Votes	%	±%
Republican	Pete Sessions	71,461	56.48	+2.16
Democratic	Will Pryor	52,269	41.27	−2.75
Libertarian	John B. Hawley	2,922	2.31	+0.66
Majority		19,192	15.15	
Turnout		126,562		−75,584
Republican hold		Swing	+4.85	
