= North Texas Invasive Species Barrier Act of 2014 =

2014 United States legislation

- Long title: To exempt from Lacey Act Amendments of 1981 certain water transfers by the North Texas Municipal Water District and the Greater Texoma Utility Authority, and for other purposes.
- Announced in: the 113th United States Congress
- Sponsored by: Rep. Ralph M. Hall (R, TX-4)
- Number of co-sponsors: 2

Citations
- Public law: Pub. L. 113–117 (text) (PDF)

Codification
- U.S.C. sections affected: 16 U.S.C. § 3371 et seq., 18 U.S.C. § 42

Legislative history
- Introduced in the House as H.R. 4032 by Rep. Ralph M. Hall (R, TX-4) on February 11, 2014; Committee consideration by United States House Committee on Natural Resources, United States House Committee on the Judiciary, United States House Judiciary Subcommittee on Crime, Terrorism, Homeland Security and Investigations, United States House Natural Resources Subcommittee on Fisheries, Wildlife, Oceans and Insular Affairs; Passed the House on April 28, 2014 (voice vote); Passed the Senate on May 22, 2014 (unanimous consent); Signed into law by President Barack Obama on June 9, 2014

The North Texas Invasive Species Barrier Act of 2014 (H.R. 4032; Pub. L. 113–117 (text) (PDF)) is a bill that would exempt the North Texas Municipal Water District (NTMWD) from prosecution under the Lacey Act for transferring water containing invasive species from Oklahoma to Texas. The Lacey Act protects plants and wildlife by creating civil and criminal penalties for various violations, including transferring invasive species across state borders. The exemption would allow water transfers to go ahead and happen.

The bill passed in the United States House of Representatives during the 113th United States Congress.

== Background ==
The Lacey Act of 1900, or simply the Lacey Act (16 U.S.C. §§ 3371–3378) is a conservation law in the United States. Introduced into Congress by Rep. John F. Lacey, an Iowa Republican, the act was signed into law by President William McKinley on May 25, 1900. The Lacey Act protects both plants and wildlife by creating civil and criminal penalties for a wide array of violations. It prohibits trade in wildlife, fish, and plants that have been illegally taken, transported or sold. The law is still in effect, although it has been amended several times.

Invasive species, also called invasive exotics or simply exotics, is a nomenclature term and categorization phrase used for flora and fauna, and for specific restoration-preservation processes in native habitats, with several definitions. The first definition, the most used, applies to introduced species (also called "non-indigenous" or "non-native") that adversely affect the habitats and bioregions they invade economically, environmentally, and/or ecologically. Such invasive species may be either plants or animals and may disrupt by dominating a region, wilderness areas, particular habitats, or wildland–urban interface land from loss of natural controls (such as predators or herbivores). This includes non-native invasive plant species labeled as exotic pest plants and invasive exotics growing in native plant communities. It has been used in this sense by government organizations as well as conservation groups such as the International Union for Conservation of Nature (IUCN) and the California Native Plant Society. The European Union defines "Invasive Alien Species" as those that are, firstly, outside their natural distribution area, and secondly, threaten biological diversity. It is also used by land managers, botanists, researchers, horticulturalists, conservationists, and the public for noxious weeds. The kudzu vine (Pueraria lobata), Andean Pampas grass (Cortaderia jubata), and yellow starthistle (Centaurea solstitialis) are examples.

== Provisions of the bill ==
This summary is based largely on the summary provided by the Congressional Research Service, a public domain source.

The North Texas Invasive Species Barrier Act of 2014 would make the Lacey Act Amendments of 1981 and provisions of the federal criminal code prohibiting importation of injurious animals inapplicable to any water transfer by the North Texas Municipal Water District and the Greater Texoma Utility Authority using only closed conveyance systems from the Lake Texoma raw water intake structure to treatment facilities at which all genera and species prohibited in accordance with such Act and the criminal code provision are extirpated and removed from the transferred water.

== Congressional Budget Office report ==
This summary is based largely on the summary provided by the Congressional Budget Office, as ordered reported by the House Committee on Natural Resources on March 18, 2014. This is a public domain source.

H.R. 4032 would exempt the North Texas Municipal Water District (NTMWD) from prosecution under the Lacey Act for transferring water containing invasive species from Oklahoma to Texas. The Lacey Act protects plants and wildlife by creating civil and criminal penalties for various violations, including transferring invasive species across state borders.

Based on information provided by the U.S. Fish and Wildlife Service (USFWS), the Congressional Budget Office (CBO) estimates that implementing the legislation would have no significant effect on the federal budget. Under current law, federal agencies, including the USFWS and the Department of Justice, have the authority to negotiate agreements that would allow the NTMWD to make these transfers without being prosecuted. Enacting H.R. 4032 could reduce revenues from penalties under the Lacey Act; therefore, pay-as-you-go procedures apply. However, CBO estimates that any such reductions would be negligible. Enacting the bill would not affect direct spending.

H.R. 4032 contains no intergovernmental or private-sector mandates as defined in the Unfunded Mandates Reform Act.

== Procedural history ==
The North Texas Invasive Species Barrier Act of 2014 was introduced into the United States House of Representatives on February 11, 2014 by Rep. Ralph M. Hall (R, TX-4). It was referred to the United States House Committee on Natural Resources, the United States House Committee on the Judiciary, the United States House Judiciary Subcommittee on Crime, Terrorism, Homeland Security and Investigations, and the United States House Natural Resources Subcommittee on Fisheries, Wildlife, Oceans and Insular Affairs. It was reported by the committee alongside House Report 113-413 part 1. On April 28, 2014, the House voted to pass the bill in a voice vote. On May 22, 2014, the United States Senate passed the bill by unanimous consent. On June 9, 2014, President Barack Obama signed the bill into law, making it Pub. L. 113–117 (text) (PDF).

== Debate and discussion ==
Rep. Pete Sessions supported the bill, arguing that it was necessary to prevent "more than 1.5 million customers of the North Texas Municipal Water District" from facing "restricted access to water as a result of the discovery of invasive species in Lake Texoma." According to Sessions, there are existing precautions to remove and extirpate invasive species.

== See also ==
- List of bills in the 113th United States Congress
