= Ralph Hall =

American politician (1923–2019)

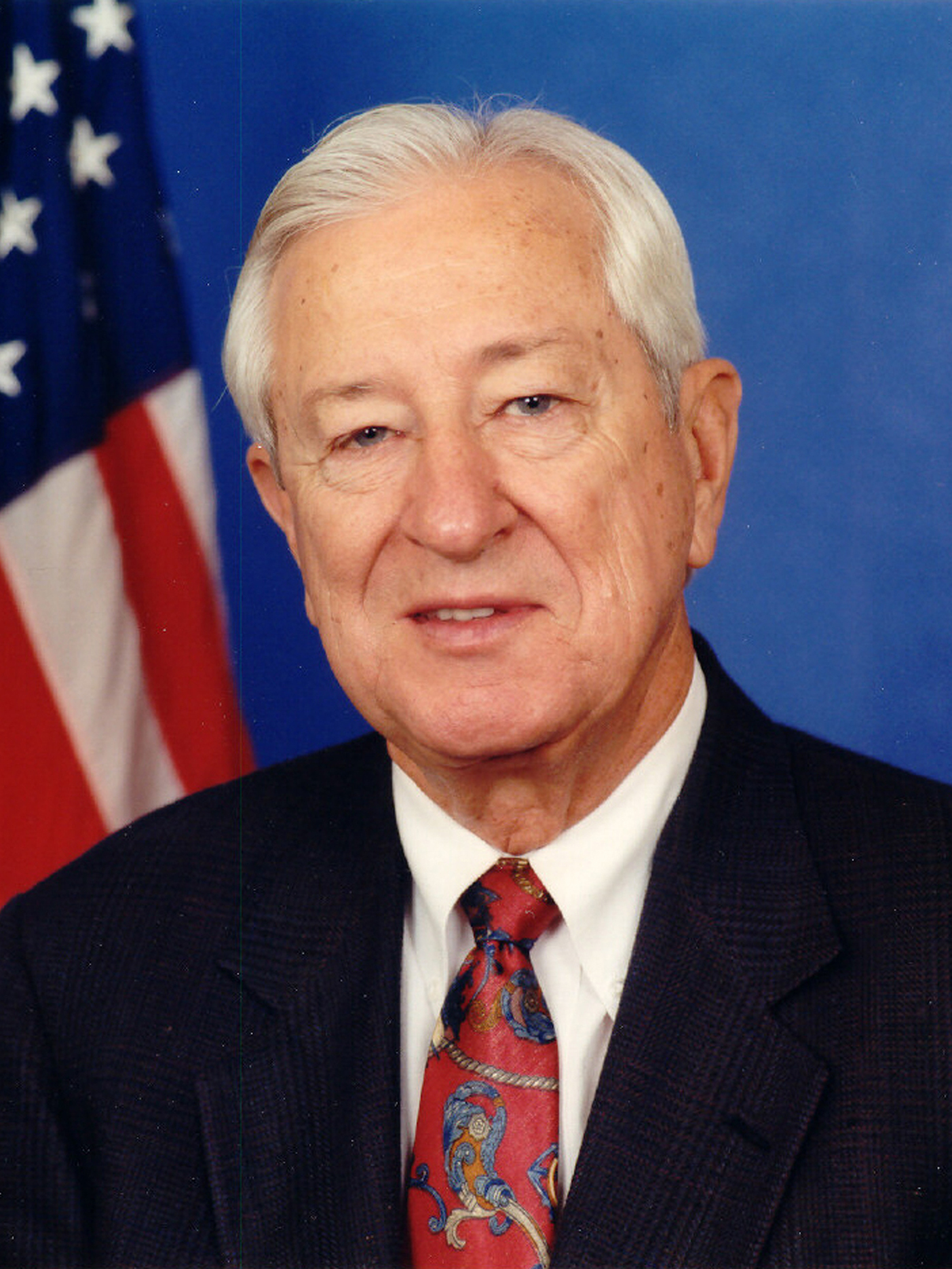
- Official portrait, 2004

Chair of the House Science Committee
- In office January 3, 2011 – January 3, 2013
- Preceded by: Bart Gordon
- Succeeded by: Lamar Smith

Member of the U.S. House of Representatives from Texas's 4th district
- In office January 3, 1981 – January 3, 2015
- Preceded by: Ray Roberts
- Succeeded by: John Ratcliffe

Member of the Texas Senate from the 9th district
- In office January 8, 1963 – January 9, 1973
- Preceded by: Ray Roberts
- Succeeded by: Ron Clower

Personal details
- Born: Ralph Moody Hall; May 3, 1923 Fate, Texas, U.S.
- Died: March 7, 2019 (aged 95) Rockwall, Texas, U.S.
- Party: Democratic (before 2004); Republican (after 2004)
- Spouse: Mary Ellen Murphy (m. 1944; died 2008)
- Children: 3
- Education: Texas Christian University; University of Texas, Austin; Southern Methodist University (LLB)

Military service
- Branch/service: United States Navy
- Years of service: 1942–1945
- Rank: Lieutenant
- Battles/wars: World War II
- Hall's voice Hall on his support for a substitute amendment to H.R.3322, the Omnibus Civilian Science Authorization Act of 1996; Recorded May 29, 1996

Ralph Moody Hall (May 3, 1923 – March 7, 2019) was an American politician who served as the United States representative for Texas's 4th congressional district from 1981 to 2015. He was first elected in 1980, and was the chairman of the House Committee on Science, Space and Technology from 2011 to 2013. He was also a member of the Committee on Energy and Commerce. In 2004, he switched to the Republican Party after having been a member of the Democratic Party for more than 50 years.

At the end of his final term in 2015, Hall was 91 years old, making him the oldest serving member of Congress and the oldest person to ever have served in the House of Representatives. He was also the oldest member of the House to cast a vote, and alongside Michigan representative John Dingell, one of the last two World War II veterans serving in Congress, both leaving office at the end of the 113th Congress in 2015.

On March 6, 2014, Hall was challenged in the Republican primary by five other Republicans. He received 45.42% of the vote, which was under 50%, the amount required to avoid a runoff election. In the runoff, Hall faced former U.S. Attorney John Ratcliffe, who finished second in the primary with 28.77% of the vote. On May 27, 2014, Ratcliffe defeated Hall in the runoff election, 53 to 47%.

== Early life, education, and law career ==
Hall was born in Fate, Texas, and was a lifelong resident of Rockwall County, northeast of Dallas. He graduated from Rockwall High School in 1941. He joined the U.S. Navy on December 10, 1942, serving as an aircraft carrier pilot from 1942 to 1945 during World War II, attaining the rank of lieutenant.

When he was young, Hall pumped gas for a man and woman whom he later identified as the infamous gangsters Bonnie and Clyde.

He attended Texas Christian University in Fort Worth during 1943. After the war, he attended the University of Texas (1946–1947), and received a law degree from Southern Methodist University in Dallas in 1951. He was admitted to the Texas Bar in 1951 and maintained a private law practice in Rockwall for many years.

== Early political career (1950–1973) ==
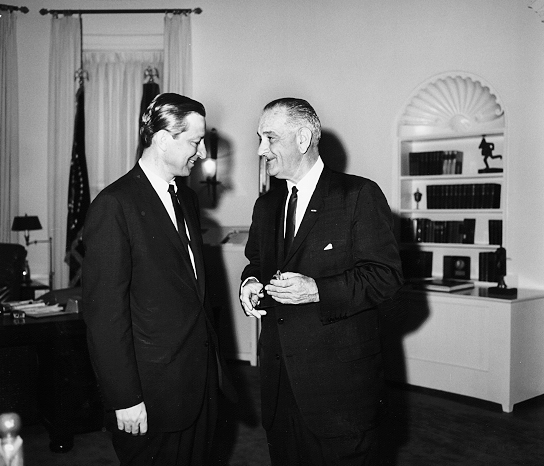
Hall meeting with President Lyndon B. Johnson

Hall was elected county judge of Rockwall County, Texas, in November 1950. He held that position until 1962.

In 1962, he was elected to the Texas State Senate after incumbent Ray Roberts won a special election to replace Sam Rayburn in Congress. As a state senator, he chaired a variety of committees:

- Consumer Protection (1969–1972)
- County, District, and Urban Affairs (1969–1972)
- Historical and Recreational Sites (1969–1970)
- Motion Picture Theater Industry (1969–1970)
- Counties, Cities, and Towns (1967–1968)
- Local and Uncontested Bills (1967–1968)
- Transportation (1965–1966)

In 1972, he ran for lieutenant governor of Texas and lost the Democratic primary, getting only 15% of the vote. Bill Hobby won the primary with a plurality of 33%, and won the general election.

== Business (1973–1980) ==
During this time, Hall became President & CEO of Texas Aluminum Corporation and was the founding member and Chairman of Lakeside National Bank of Rockwall. He also continued to build his law practice with his longtime friend and law partner, Don Stodghill.

== Later political career (1980–2015) ==
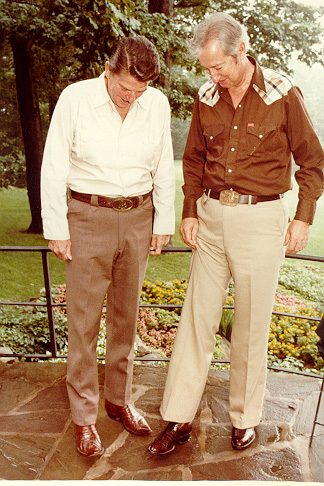
Hall and President Ronald Reagan at Camp David

=== Elections ===
In 1980, incumbent Democratic U.S. congressman Ray Roberts of Texas's 4th congressional district decided to retire. Hall won the Democratic primary with 57% of the vote. In the general election, he defeated Republican business manager John Wright, with 52% of the vote, the closest race in the district's history and the lowest winning percentage in a general election in Hall's political career. He was the fourth person to represent the 4th District since its creation in 1903. The district's second congressman, Rayburn, the longtime Speaker of the House, represented the district for 48 years. He has never won re-election in a general election with less than 58% of the vote.

2004

In November 2004, Hall ran for his first full term as a Republican. He got heavy White House backing, from then-President George W. Bush in the three-way GOP primary that year, defeating two opponents. Hall won the primary with 78% of the vote, and the general election with 67% of the vote, defeating Democratic candidate Jim Nickerson and Libertarian Kevin D. Anderson.

2006

Hall defeated Democratic candidate Glenn Melancon and Libertarian candidate Kurt Helm in the 2006 general election with 67% of the vote.

2008

In the general election, Hall again faced Democratic nominee Glenn Melancon and was re-elected with 69% of the vote.

2010

In the Republican primary, Hall won the nomination with 57% of the vote, his worst performance in a primary election since his first election in 1980. It was a six-candidate race, with his closest opponent, Steve Clark, winning 30% of the vote. In the general election, he won re-election with 73% of the vote against Democratic candidate VaLinda Hathcox and two other candidates.

2012

Hall won the Republican primary with 58% of the vote. He won over Democratic candidate VaLinda Hathcox in the general election for the second race in a row, this time by 73 to 24%.

2014

In May 2013, Hall announced his bid for an 18th term in the U.S. House. On December 20, 2013, he said that the 2014 campaign would be his last, regardless of the result.

In the March 4, 2014 Republican primary, Hall led a six-candidate field with 29,815 votes (45.4%). Because he did not obtain a majority of the ballots cast, Hall was forced to enter the May 27, 2014 runoff election with the runner-up, former U.S. Attorney John Ratcliffe of Heath, who received 18,891 votes (28.8%).

Ratcliffe defeated Hall in a contentious and expensive March 21 runoff. With the loss, Hall became the first sitting Republican U.S. representative from Texas to unsuccessfully seek renomination to his or her seat out of 257 attempts since statehood. No Democrat even filed, meaning that the runoff was the real contest for the seat. Accordingly, Ratcliffe was elected unopposed in the general election, and assumed office on January 3, 2015.

=== Tenure ===
Hall described himself as "an old-time conservative Democrat." For many years, he was one of the most conservative Democrats in the House. He was an early supporter of a constitutional amendment requiring a balanced federal budget and also favored legislation requiring a super majority on any tax increases. He frequently opposed the Clinton Administration, and voted for three of the four articles of impeachment against President Bill Clinton. He endorsed George W. Bush for President in 2000, becoming one of the few Democratic politicians to do so. The two had been friends for years, and Bush later endorsed Hall in his re-election.

While Hall was very conservative even by Texas Democratic standards, his conservatism can be attributed to the demographics of the 4th district. It had once been reliably Democratic, but became increasingly friendly to Republicans as Dallas' suburban growth spilled into the western portion of the district; indeed, the district included a small portion of Dallas itself. The 4th has not supported the Democratic nominee for president since 1964. Despite this district's increasingly Republican tilt, Hall won 10 more terms as a Democrat with an average of 60% of the vote. In 1994, for instance, he was re-elected by a 19-point margin, even as other conservative Democratic congressmen lost their seats. By the turn of the century, he was the only elected Democratic official above the county level in what had become one of the most conservative districts in Texas.

Like many in the Democratic Party, he voted against the North American Free Trade Agreement. In 1999, he was one of six Democratic congressmen who supported a Republican tax cut plan. He has been an original co-sponsor of bills to repeal the estate tax and the marriage tax.

In late 2002, he voted for the resolution allowing the use of force in Iraq. In March 2003, he voted for a budget that included Bush's 10-year, $726 billion tax cut plan. The plan passed the House 215–212.

2004 party switch

Hall was frequently urged to switch parties, especially after the Republicans took control of the House in 1995. Even as Democrats with far less conservative voting records than Hall's, such as Greg Laughlin, Jimmy Hayes, Billy Tauzin, and Nathan Deal, all switched parties, he insisted that he would remain a Democrat as long as it did not hurt his constituents. He said that he had an obligation to "pull my party back toward the middle." He was one of the co-founders of the Blue Dog Coalition, a group of moderate and conservative Democratic congressmen.

In 2003, House Majority Leader Tom DeLay engineered a controversial mid-decade redistricting. Hall was the only White Democratic congressman not targeted by the remap, but his district was shifted slightly to the north. Tyler, the heart of the 4th for a century, was shifted to the neighboring 1st District. It did, however, pick up a portion of Collin County, which had been part of the district until the 1980s round of redistricting.

In January 2004, on the final day for candidates to file to get their names on the ballot for the March 9, 2004, primary, Hall switched parties and became a Republican. He said that Republicans refused to put money for his district into a spending bill, and when he asked why, "the only reason I was given was that I was a Democrat." He also cited concerns with his Democratic criticism of President Bush; he had not attended Democratic caucus meetings for some time due to the criticism leveled at Bush, his longtime friend. He told the press, "The country is at war. When the country is at war you need to support the president. Some of my fellow congressmen have not been doing that."

After the switch, which became official on January 5, 2004, the GOP allowed him to keep his seniority. He became chairman of the House Energy Subcommittee on Energy and Air Quality. He also joined the Republican Study Committee, a caucus of conservative House Republicans.

Northern Mariana Islands (CNMI)

The Northern Mariana Islands are a U.S. commonwealth in the Pacific with a large garment industry. Billing records of Preston Gates Ellis and Rouvelas Meeds, an international law firm employed by the CNMI, the government of the islands, show numerous contacts between the law firm and Hall's office. He said his dealings with the law firm were with Lloyd Meeds, a partner with the firm, which at the time listed 36 attorneys on staff, not with Jack Abramoff, the firm's representative for the CNMI contract. In 2006, he said of the Northern Marianas, "They were good allies, and I believed their government should handle their affairs and not have us impose labor laws on them."

In December 1996, Hall and E.K. Slaughter, a friend, and their wives visited the Commonwealth of the Northern Mariana Islands. The trip was arranged by the National Security Caucus Foundation (NSCF), which told him that the trip would be paid for by that group. Greg Hilton, the director of the now-defunct NCSF, had no funding for such trips; he only arranged them with CNMI officials. Hilton said he was led to believe by officials of Preston Gates that the CNMI would pay the expenses and be reimbursed by the private sector. In fact, Preston Gates paid the expenses for such trips and billed the CNMI for reimbursement. For the trip of Hall, Slaughter and their wives, Abramoff billed the CNMI $12,800.

In September 1997, Democratic Representative Neil Abercrombie placed remarks in the Congressional Record describing a teenager described as "Katrina", whose story had been widely publicized, stating that an "employer had lured her to the CNMI under false pretenses" and that "she was also forced into service as a prostitute."

Abramoff's staff contacted Hall's office 15 times in the two months following Abercrombie's remarks. In November 1997, he entered into the Congressional Record a statement saying that upon reviewing those remarks, he had "felt that Congressman Abercrombie had relied on an erroneous and misleading article published by the Reader's Digest some months ago." The article, according to Hall, said that the teenager "was forced to perform lewd sex acts with customers before a video camera." He quoted a report by the acting attorney general of the CNMI in response: "in fact...she wanted to do nude dancing...to support her family." The remarks by Abercrombie did not cite that source, and the Reader's Digest June 1997 story by Henry Hurt, "Shame on American Soil", does not refer to a child named Katrina.

In his remarks, he also said, "I intend to seek further information on matters as reported by the Reader's Digest author—and I would hope that a fair-minded person like Congressman Abercrombie would accompany me early next year if, and when, we can both work a visit into our schedule—a visit that would not involve the expenditure of any American tax dollars.

Asked in 2006 how the 1996 trip benefited the Texas 4th Congressional District he represents, he said, "I think it benefits my constituents if you do anything that benefits the peace through strength people, when you're going out to bring information to them to help win the Cold War. That's a benefit to them, to their strategic interests." The last gasps of the Cold War ended in 1991.

He also said "the whole thing was about ... them setting their own minimum wage. They had told me they would waive their foreign aid in return for setting their own minimum wage." His comments in the Congressional Record in 1997 do not mention a minimum wage and the CNMI receives no foreign aid.

Views on climate change

On December 1, 2011, Hall gave an interview to National Journal in which he expressed disbelief in anthropogenic climate change. He accused climate scientists of concocting the evidence for anthropogenic climate change to receive federal research grants, citing the Climategate controversy and calling investigations which had largely exonerated them "straw-man reviews". He stated, "I'm really more fearful of freezing. And I don't have any science to prove that, but we have a lot of science that tells us they're not basing it on real scientific facts." He responded to allegations that Republicans could be called anti-science in light of these views by saying, "I'm not anti-science, I'm pro-science, but we ought to have some believable science.... We have to be more careful what outlays we make for something that hasn't been proved."

Legislation sponsored

Hall introduced into the House the North Texas Invasive Species Barrier Act of 2014 (H.R. 4032; 113th Congress), a bill that would exempt the North Texas Municipal Water District from prosecution under the Lacey Act for transferring water containing invasive species from Oklahoma to Texas. The Lacey Act protects plants and wildlife by creating civil and criminal penalties for various violations, including transferring invasive species across state borders.

=== Committee assignments ===
- Committee on Science and Technology (Chair Emeritus)
  - Subcommittee on Energy
  - Subcommittee on Space
- Committee on Energy and Commerce
  - Subcommittee on Environment and Economy
  - Subcommittee on Oversight and Investigations

=== Caucus memberships ===
- International Conservation Caucus
- Republican Study Committee
- Tea Party Caucus

== Personal life ==
Hall married the former Mary Ellen Murphy on November 14, 1944, while he was serving in the United States Navy in Pensacola, Florida. They had three sons, Hampton, Brett, and Blakeley, and (as of 2013) had five grandchildren. She died on August 27, 2008.

In January 2004, regarding his switch of party, Hall said "I talked with some of my family. Some agreed, some did not. My wife didn't agree. She'd rather I quit than switch parties."

Hall died of natural causes on March 7, 2019, in Rockwall, Texas, at the age of 95.

== Electoral history ==
Texas's 4th congressional district:

Year	Democratic			Republican			Libertarian			Other		
Year	Candidate	Votes	%	Candidate	Votes	%	Candidate	Votes	%	Candidate	Votes	%
1980	√ Ralph Hall	102,787	52%	John Wright	93,915	48%	No nominee					
1982	√ Ralph Hall	94,134	74%	Pete Collumb	32,221	25%	Bruce Iiams	1,141	1%			
1984	√ Ralph Hall	120,749	58%	Thomas Blow	87,553	42%	No nominee			(Assorted)	39	0%
1986	√ Ralph Hall	97,540	72%	Thomas Blow	38,578	28%	No nominee					
1988	√ Ralph Hall	139,379	66%	Randy Sutton	67,337	32%	Melanie Dunn	3,152	2%			
1990	√ Ralph Hall	108,300	100%	No nominee			No nominee			Tim McChord (Write-in)	394	0%
1992	√ Ralph Hall	128,008	58%	David Bridges	83,875	38%	Steven Rothacker	8,450	4%			
1994	√ Ralph Hall	99,303	59%	David Bridges	67,267	40%	Steven Rothacker	2,377	1%			
1996	√ Ralph Hall	132,126	64%	Jerry Hall	71,065	34%	Steven Rothacker	3,172	2%	Enos Denham (Natural Law Party)	814	0%
1998	√ Ralph Hall	82,989	58%	Jim Lohmeyer	58,954	41%	Jim Simon	2,137	1%			
2000	√ Ralph Hall	145,887	60%	Jon Newton	91,574	38%	Joe Turner	4,417	2%			
2002	√ Ralph Hall	97,304	58%	John Graves	67,939	40%	Barbara Robinson	3,042	2%			
2004	Jim Nickerson	81,585	30%	√ Ralph Hall	182,866	68%	Kevin Anderson	3,491	1%			
2006	Glenn Melancon	55,278	33%	√ Ralph Hall	106,495	64%	Kurt Helm	3,496	2%			
2008	Glenn Melancon	88,067	29%	√ Ralph Hall	206,906	69%	Fred Annett	5,771	2%			
2010	VaLinda Hathcox	40,975	22%	√ Ralph Hall	136,338	73%	Jim Prindle	4,729	3%	Shane Shepard (Independent)	4,244	2%
2012	VaLinda Hathcox	60,214	24%	√ Ralph Hall	182,679	73%	Thomas Griffing	7,262	3%			

Source: "Office of the House Clerk – Electoral Statistics". Clerk of the United States House of Representatives.

Source: "Election Results". Federal Election Commission.

== See also ==
- List of American politicians who switched parties in office
- List of United States representatives who switched parties

U.S. House of Representatives
Preceded by Ray Roberts	Member of the U.S. House of Representatives from Texas's 4th congressional district 1981–2015	Succeeded by John Ratcliffe
Preceded by George Brown Jr.	Ranking Member of the House Science Committee; 1999–2003	Succeeded by Bart Gordon
Preceded by Bart Gordon	Ranking Member of the House Science Committee; 2007–2011	Succeeded by Eddie Bernice Johnson
Preceded by Bart Gordon	Chair of the House Science Committee; 2011–2013	Succeeded by Lamar Smith
Honorary titles
Preceded by Benjamin Gilman	Oldest member of the U.S. House of Representatives; 2003–2015	Succeeded by John Conyers
