= 1998 United States House of Representatives elections in Texas =

- November 3, 1998

All 30 Texas seats to the United States House of Representatives
	Majority party	Minority party
Party	Democratic	Republican
Last election	17	13
Seats won	17	13
Seat change	Steady	Steady
Popular vote	1,531,234	1,786,731
Percentage	44.23%	51.61%
Swing	▼0.6%	▼1.3%
Democratic
50–60%
60–70%
70–80%
80–90%
90>%
Republican
50–60%
60–70%
70–80%
80–90%
90>%

The 1998 United States House of Representatives elections in Texas occurred on November 3, 1998, to elect the members of the state of Texas's delegation to the United States House of Representatives. Texas had thirty seats in the House, apportioned according to the 1990 United States census.

These elections occurred simultaneously with the United States Senate elections of 1998, the United States House elections in other states, and various state and local elections.

Texas was one of six states in which the party that won the state's popular vote did not win a majority of seats in 1998, the other states being Florida, Louisiana, Pennsylvania, Virginia, and Wisconsin.

== Overview ==
1998 United States House of Representatives elections in Texas
Party	Votes	Percentage	Seats before	Seats after	+/–
Republican	1,786,731	51.61%	13	13	-
Democratic	1,531,234	44.23%	17	17	-
Libertarian	136,688	3.95%	0	0	-
Independent	7,232	0.21%	0	0	-
Totals	3,461,885	100.00%	30	30	—

== Congressional districts ==
=== District 1 ===
Incumbent Democrat Max Sandlin ran for re-election.

Texas's 1st congressional district, 1998
Party	Candidate	Votes	%
Democratic	Max Sandlin (incumbent)	80,788	59.41
Republican	Dennis Boerner	55,191	40.59
Total votes		135,979	100
Democratic hold			

=== District 2 ===
Incumbent Democrat Jim Turner ran for re-election.

Texas's 2nd congressional district, 1998
Party	Candidate	Votes	%
Democratic	Jim Turner (incumbent)	81,556	58.43
Republican	Brian Babin	56,891	40.76
Libertarian	Wendell Drye	1,142	0.82
Total votes		139,589	100
Democratic hold			

=== District 3 ===
Incumbent Republican Sam Johnson ran for re-election.

Texas's 3rd congressional district, 1998
Party	Candidate	Votes	%
Republican	Sam Johnson (incumbent)	106,690	91.21
Libertarian	Ken Ashby	10,288	8.79
Total votes		116,978	100
Republican hold			

=== District 4 ===
Incumbent Democrat Ralph Hall ran for re-election.

Texas's 4th congressional district, 1998
Party	Candidate	Votes	%
Democratic	Ralph M. Hall (incumbent)	82,989	57.60
Republican	Jim Lohmeyer	58,954	40.92
Libertarian	Jim Simon	2,137	1.48
Total votes		144,080	100
Democratic hold			

=== District 5 ===
Incumbent Republican Pete Sessions ran for re-election.

Texas's 5th congressional district, 1998
Party	Candidate	Votes	%
Republican	Pete Sessions (incumbent)	61,714	55.77
Democratic	Victor Morales	48,073	43.44
Libertarian	Michael Needleman	880	0.80
Total votes		110,667	100
Republican hold			

=== District 6 ===
Incumbent Republican Joe Barton ran for re-election.

Texas's 6th congressional district, 1998
Party	Candidate	Votes	%
Republican	Joe Barton (incumbent)	112,957	72.93
Democratic	Ben Boothe	40,112	25.90
Libertarian	Richard Bandlow	1,817	1.17
Total votes		154,886	100
Republican hold			

=== District 7 ===
Incumbent Republican Bill Archer ran for re-election.

Texas's 7th congressional district, 1998
Party	Candidate	Votes	%
Republican	Bill Archer (incumbent)	111,010	93.33
Libertarian	Drew Parks	7,889	6.63
Write-in	John Skone-Palmer	47	0.04
Total votes		118,946	100
Republican hold			

=== District 8 ===
Incumbent Republican Kevin Brady ran for re-election.

Texas's 8th congressional district, 1998
Party	Candidate	Votes	%
Republican	Kevin Brady (incumbent)	123,372	92.80
Libertarian	Don Richards	9,576	7.20
Total votes		132,948	100
Republican hold			

=== District 9 ===
Incumbent Democrat Nick Lampson ran for re-election.

Texas's 9th congressional district, 1998
Party	Candidate	Votes	%
Democratic	Nick Lampson (incumbent)	86,055	63.67
Republican	Tom Cottar	49,107	36.33
Total votes		135,162	100
Democratic hold			

=== District 10 ===
Incumbent Democrat Lloyd Doggett ran for re-election.

Texas's 10th congressional district, 1998
Party	Candidate	Votes	%
Democratic	Lloyd Doggett (incumbent)	116,127	85.21
Libertarian	Vincent May	20,155	14.79
Total votes		136,282	100
Democratic hold			

=== District 11 ===
Incumbent Democrat Chet Edwards ran for re-election.

Texas's 11th congressional district, 1998
Party	Candidate	Votes	%
Democratic	Chet Edwards (incumbent)	71,142	82.43
Libertarian	Vince Hanke	15,161	17.57
Total votes		86,303	100
Democratic hold			

=== District 12 ===
Incumbent Republican Kay Granger ran for re-election.

Texas's 12th congressional district, 1998
Party	Candidate	Votes	%
Republican	Kay Granger (incumbent)	66,740	61.94
Democratic	Tom Hall	39,084	36.28
Libertarian	Paul Barthel	1,917	1.78
Total votes		107,741	100
Republican hold			

=== District 13 ===
Incumbent Republican Mac Thornberry ran for re-election.

Texas's 13th congressional district, 1998
Party	Candidate	Votes	%
Republican	Mac Thornberry (incumbent)	81,141	67.92
Democratic	Mark Harmon	37,027	30.99
Libertarian	Georganne Baker Payne	1,298	1.09
Total votes		119,466	100
Republican hold			

=== District 14 ===
Incumbent Republican Ron Paul ran for re-election.

Texas's 14th congressional district, 1998
Party	Candidate	Votes	%
Republican	Ron Paul (incumbent)	84,459	55.25
Democratic	Loy Sneary	68,014	44.49
Write-in	Cynthia Newman	390	0.26
Total votes		152,863	100
Republican hold			

=== District 15 ===
Incumbent Democrat Ruben Hinojosa ran for re-election.

Texas's 15th congressional district, 1998
Party	Candidate	Votes	%
Democratic	Ruben Hinojosa (incumbent)	47,957	58.36
Republican	Tom Haughey	34,221	41.64
Total votes		82,178	100
Democratic hold			

=== District 16 ===
Incumbent Democrat Silvestre Reyes ran for re-election.

Texas's 16th congressional district, 1998
Party	Candidate	Votes	%
Democratic	Silvestre Reyes (incumbent)	67,486	87.91
Libertarian	Stu Nance	5,329	6.94
Independent	Lorenzo Morales	3,952	5.15
Total votes		76,767	100
Democratic hold			

=== District 17 ===
Incumbent Democrat Charles Stenholm ran for re-election.

Texas's 17th congressional district, 1998
Party	Candidate	Votes	%
Democratic	Charles Stenholm (incumbent)	75,367	53.57
Republican	Rudy Izzard	63,700	45.28
Libertarian	Gordon Mobley	1,618	1.15
Total votes		140,685	100
Democratic hold			

=== District 18 ===
Incumbent Democrat Sheila Jackson Lee ran for re-election.

Texas's 18th congressional district, 1998
Party	Candidate	Votes	%
Democratic	Sheila Jackson Lee (incumbent)	82,091	89.95
Libertarian	James Galvan	9,176	10.05
Total votes		91,267	100
Democratic hold			

=== District 19 ===
Incumbent Republican Larry Combest ran for re-election.

Texas's 19th congressional district, 1998
Party	Candidate	Votes	%
Republican	Larry Combest (incumbent)	108,266	83.65
Democratic	Sidney Blankenship	21,162	16.35
Total votes		129,428	100
Republican hold			

=== District 20 ===
Incumbent Democrat Henry B. González opted to retire rather than run for re-election. He initially planned to retire prior to the end of his term, which would have led to the calling of a special election, but he ended up serving the entire remainder of his term. His son Charlie ran for the open seat.

Texas's 20th congressional district, 1998
Party	Candidate	Votes	%
Democratic	Charlie Gonzalez	50,356	63.17
Republican	James Walker	28,347	35.56
Libertarian	Alex DePena	1,010	1.27
Total votes		79,713	100
Democratic hold			

=== District 21 ===
Incumbent Republican Lamar Smith ran for re-election.

Texas's 21st congressional district, 1998
Party	Candidate	Votes	%
Republican	Lamar Smith (incumbent)	165,047	91.38
Libertarian	Jeffrey Charles Blunt	15,561	8.62
Total votes		180,608	100
Republican hold			

=== District 22 ===
Incumbent Republican Tom DeLay ran for re-election.

Texas's 22nd congressional district, 1998
Party	Candidate	Votes	%
Republican	Tom DeLay (incumbent)	87,840	65.20
Democratic	Hill Kemp	45,386	33.69
Libertarian	Steve Grupe	1,494	1.11
Total votes		134,720	100
Republican hold			

=== District 23 ===
Incumbent Republican Henry Bonilla ran for re-election.

Texas's 23rd congressional district, 1998
Party	Candidate	Votes	%
Republican	Henry Bonilla (incumbent)	73,177	63.79
Democratic	Charlie Urbina Jones	40,281	35.11
Libertarian	Bill Stallknecht	1,262	1.10
Total votes		114,720	100
Republican hold			

=== District 24 ===
Incumbent Democrat Martin Frost ran for re-election.

Texas's 24th congressional district, 1998
Party	Candidate	Votes	%
Democratic	Martin Frost (incumbent)	56,321	57.48
Republican	Shawn Terry	40,105	40.93
Independent	George Arias	830	0.85
Libertarian	David Stover	736	0.75
Total votes		97,992	100
Democratic hold			

=== District 25 ===
Incumbent Democrat Ken Bentsen ran for re-election.

Texas's 25th congressional district, 1998
Party	Candidate	Votes	%
Democratic	Ken Bentsen (incumbent)	58,591	57.86
Republican	John Sanchez	41,848	41.32
Libertarian	Eric Atkisson	830	0.82
Total votes		101,269	100
Democratic hold			

=== District 26 ===
Incumbent Republican Dick Armey ran for re-election.

Texas's 26th congressional district, 1998
Party	Candidate	Votes	%
Republican	Dick Armey (incumbent)	120,332	88.15
Libertarian	Joe Turner	16,182	11.85
Total votes		136,514	100
Republican hold			

=== District 27 ===
Incumbent Democrat Solomon Ortiz ran for re-election.

Texas's 27th congressional district, 1998
Party	Candidate	Votes	%
Democratic	Solomon Ortiz (incumbent)	61,638	63.28
Republican	Erol Stone	34,284	35.20
Libertarian	Mark Pretz	1,476	1.52
Total votes		97,398	100
Democratic hold			

=== District 28 ===
Incumbent Democrat Frank Tejeda died on January 30, 1997, from pneumonia while being treated for a brain tumor. This prompted a special election to be held, which fellow Democrat Ciro Rodriguez won in a runoff. He ran for re-election.

Texas's 28th congressional district, 1998
Party	Candidate	Votes	%
Democratic	Ciro Rodriguez (incumbent)	71,849	90.54
Libertarian	Edward Elmer	7,504	9.46
Total votes		79,353	100
Democratic hold			

=== District 29 ===
Incumbent Democrat Gene Green ran for re-election.

Texas's 29th congressional district, 1998
Party	Candidate	Votes	%
Democratic	Gene Green (incumbent)	44,179	92.75
Independent	Lea Sherman	2,013	4.23
Libertarian	James Chudleigh	1,439	3.02
Total votes		47,631	100
Democratic hold			

=== District 30 ===
Incumbent Democrat Eddie Bernice Johnson ran for re-election.

Texas's 30th congressional district, 1998
Party	Candidate	Votes	%
Democratic	Eddie Bernice Johnson (incumbent)	57,603	72.23
Republican	Carrie Kelleher	21,338	26.76
Libertarian	Barbara Robinson	811	1.02
Total votes		79,752	100
Democratic hold			
