= 2002 United States House of Representatives elections in Texas =

- November 5, 2002

All 32 Texas seats to the United States House of Representatives
	Majority party	Minority party
Party	Democratic	Republican
Last election	17	13
Seats won	17	15
Seat change	Steady	▲2
Popular vote	1,885,178	2,290,723
Percentage	43.89%	53.33%
Swing	▼2.9%	▲4.6%

Democratic
50–60%
60–70%
70–80%
80–90%
90>%
Republican
50–60%
60–70%
70–80%
80–90%
90>%
Tie
40–50%

The 2002 United States House of Representatives elections in Texas occurred on November 5, 2002, to elect the members of the state of Texas's delegation to the United States House of Representatives. Texas had thirty-two seats in the House, apportioned according to the 2000 United States census. The state gained two seats in reapportionment. Democrats narrowly maintained control of the Texas House of Representatives after the 2000 election after heavily emphasizing it as necessary to protect the party from a potential Republican gerrymander. During the 2001 regular session, the divided legislature failed to pass any redistricting plans. Congressional redistricting fell to the courts in Balderas v. State of Texas after no special session was called to address redistricting. While the court's initial map appeared to benefit Republicans, the final maps ordered for the 2002 elections were seen as beneficial to Democrats.

These elections occurred simultaneously with the United States Senate elections of 2002, the United States House elections in other states, and various state and local elections. Democrats managed to maintain their majority of seats in Texas' congressional delegation despite the fact that Republicans won more votes statewide. As of 2026, this is the last time the Democratic Party won a majority of congressional districts from Texas.

Texas was one of six states in which the party that won the state's popular vote did not win a majority of seats in 2002, the other states being Connecticut, Illinois, Michigan, New Mexico, and Tennessee.

== Overview ==
2002 United States House of Representatives elections in Texas
Party	Votes	Percentage	Seats before	Seats after	+/–
Republican	2,290,723	53.33%	13	15	+2
Democratic	1,885,178	43.89%	17	17	0
Libertarian	107,141	2.49%	0	0	0
Green	10,394	0.24%	0	0	0
Independent	1,774	0.04%	0	0	0
Totals	4,295,210	100.00%	30	32	+2

== District 1 ==
2002 Texas's 1st congressional district election
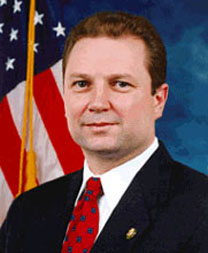

Nominee	Max Sandlin	John Lawrence
Party	Democratic	Republican
Popular vote	86,384	66,654
Percentage	56.45%	43.55%
- County results Sandlin: 50–60% 60–70% 70–80% Lawrence: 50–60%
U.S. Representative before election
Max Sandlin
Democratic
Elected U.S. Representative
Max Sandlin
Democratic

Incumbent Democrat Max Sandlin successfully ran for re-election, defeating Republican John Lawrence. As of 2024 this is the last time a Democrat was elected to this seat, as well as the last time the Democratic candidate got over 40% of the vote.

=== Predictions ===
Source	Ranking	As of
Sabato's Crystal Ball	Safe D	November 4, 2002
New York Times	Safe D	October 14, 2002

=== Results ===
Texas's 1st congressional district, 2002
Party	Candidate	Votes	%
Democratic	Max Sandlin (incumbent)	86,384	56.45
Republican	John Lawrence	66,654	43.55
Total votes		153,038	100
Democratic hold			

== District 2 ==
Incumbent Democrat Jim Turner ran for re-election.

2002 Texas's 2nd congressional district election
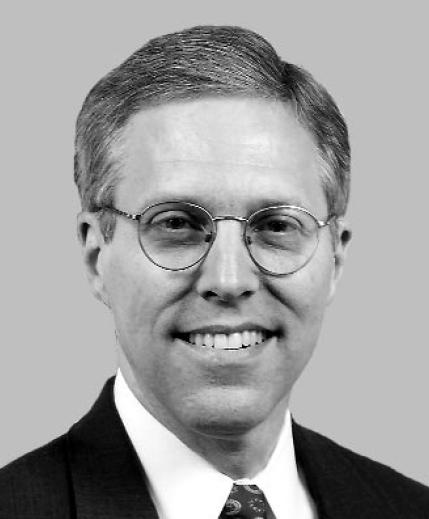

Nominee	Jim Turner	Donna Peterson
Party	Democratic	Republican
Popular vote	85,492	53,656
Percentage	60.85%	38.19%
- County results Turner: 50–60% 60–70% 70–80% Peterson: 60–70%
U.S. Representative before election
Charlie Wilson
Democratic
Elected U.S. Representative
Charlie Wilson
Democratic

=== Predictions ===
Source	Ranking	As of
Sabato's Crystal Ball	Safe D	November 4, 2002
New York Times	Safe D	October 14, 2002

=== Results ===
Texas's 2nd congressional district, 2002
Party	Candidate	Votes	%
Democratic	Jim Turner (incumbent)	85,492	60.85
Republican	Van Brookshire	53,656	38.19
Libertarian	Peter Beach	1,353	0.96
Total votes		140,501	100
Democratic hold			

== District 3 ==
2002 Texas's 3rd congressional district election
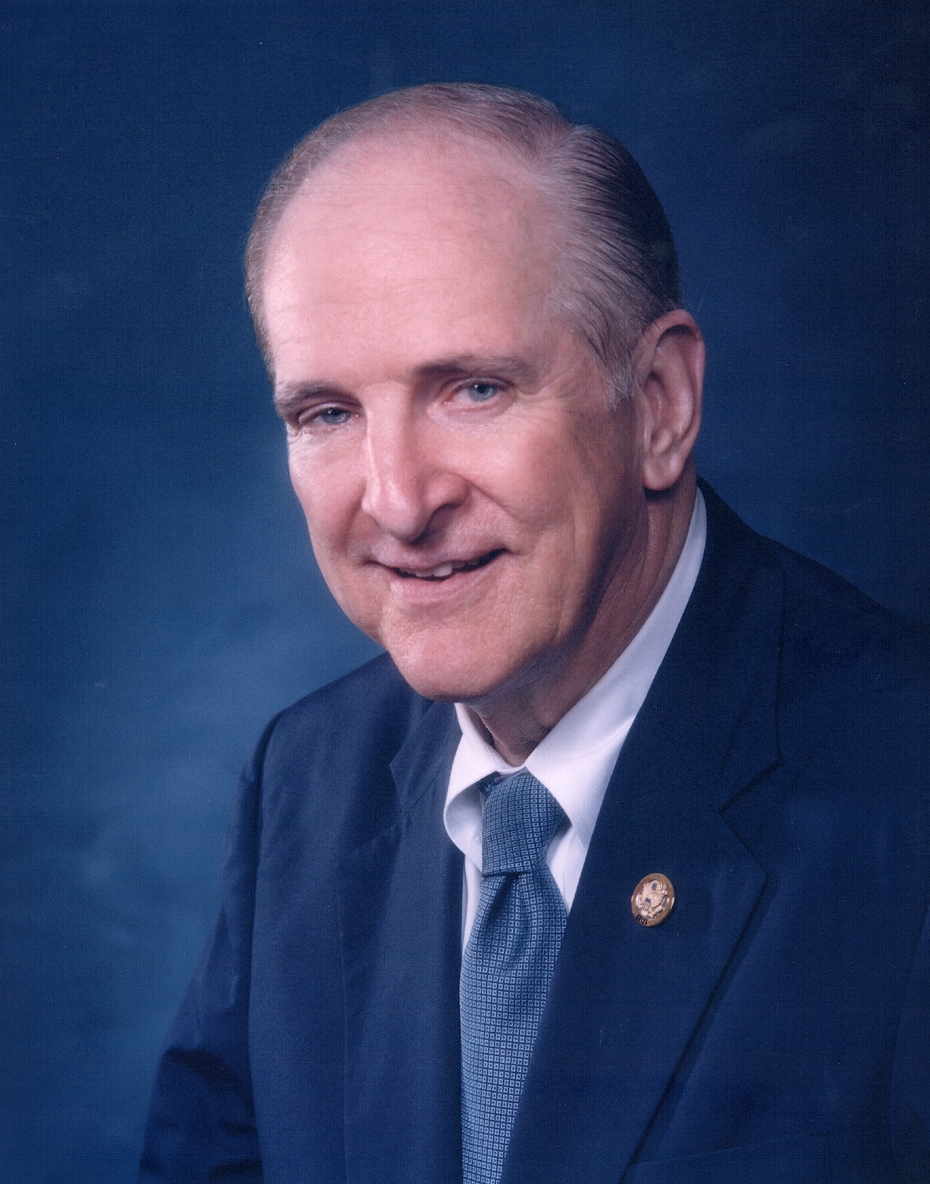

Nominee	Sam Johnson	Manny Molera
Party	Republican	Democratic
Popular vote	113,974	37,503
Percentage	74.0%	24.3%
- County results Johnson: 60–70% 70–80%
U.S. Representative before election
Sam Johnson
Republican
Elected U.S. Representative
Sam Johnson
Republican

Incumbent Republican Sam Johnson ran for re-election.

=== Predictions ===
Source	Ranking	As of
Sabato's Crystal Ball	Safe R	November 4, 2002
New York Times	Safe R	October 14, 2002

=== Results ===
Texas's 3rd congressional district, 2002
Party	Candidate	Votes	%
Republican	Sam Johnson (incumbent)	113,974	73.95
Democratic	Manny Molera	37,503	24.33
Libertarian	John Davis	2,656	1.72
Total votes		154,133	100
Republican hold			

== District 4 ==
2002 Texas' 4th congressional district election
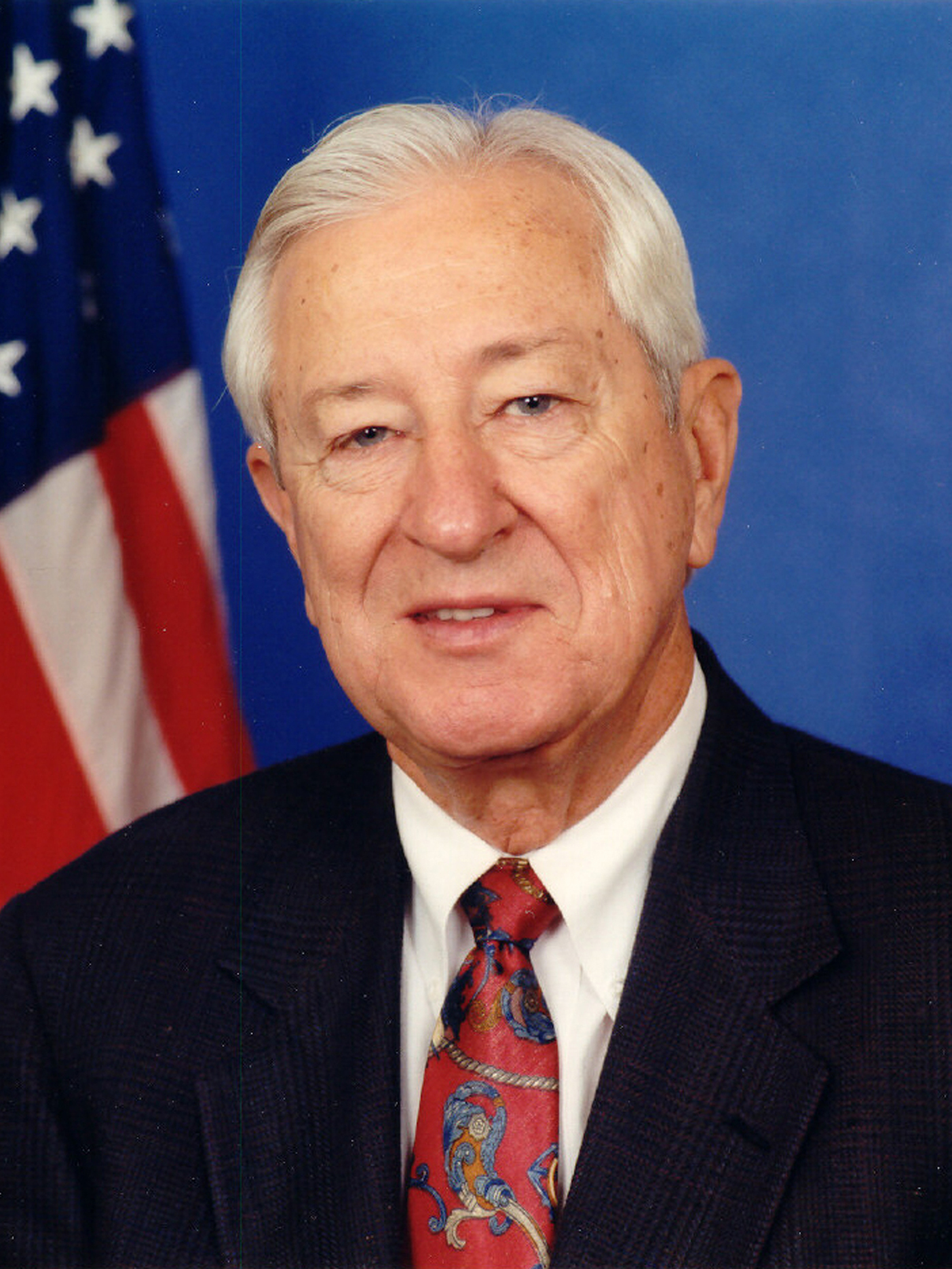

Nominee	Ralph Hall	John Graves
Party	Democratic	Republican
Popular vote	97,304	67,939
Percentage	57.8%	40.4%
- County results Hall: 50–60% 60–70% 70–80% Graves: 50–60%
U.S. Representative before election
Ralph Hall
Democratic
Elected U.S. Representative
Ralph Hall
Democratic

Incumbent Democrat Ralph Hall successfully ran for re-election. This was the last time Hall ran as a Democrat, as he switched to the Republican Party in early 2004. As such, this is the last time a Democrat was elected to this seat.

=== Predictions ===
Source	Ranking	As of
Sabato's Crystal Ball	Safe D	November 4, 2002
New York Times	Safe D	October 14, 2002

=== Results ===
Texas's 4th congressional district, 2002
Party	Candidate	Votes	%
Democratic	Ralph M. Hall (incumbent)	97,304	57.82
Republican	John Graves	67,939	40.37
Libertarian	Barbara Robinson	3,042	1.81
Total votes		168,285	100
Democratic hold			

== District 5 ==
2002 Texas's 5th congressional district election
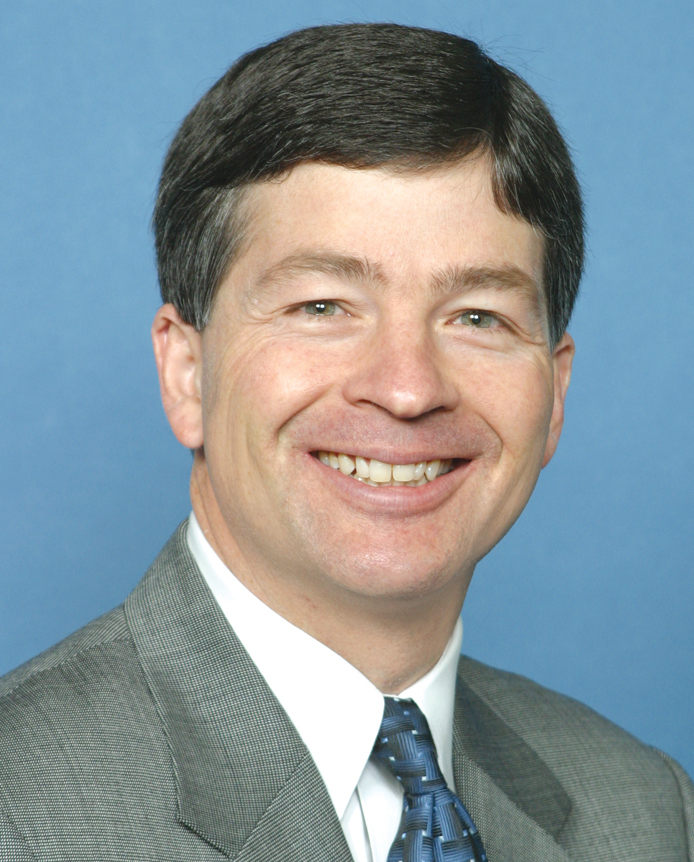

Nominee	Jeb Hensarling	Ron Chapman
Party	Republican	Democratic
Popular vote	81,439	56,330
Percentage	58.2%	40.3%
- County results Hensarling: 50–60% 60–70% 70–80% Chapman: 50–60%
U.S. Representative before election
Pete Sessions
Republican
Elected U.S. Representative
Jeb Hensarling
Republican

Incumbent Republican Pete Sessions was redistricted to the newly created 32nd District. He ran for re-election there.

=== Predictions ===
Source	Ranking	As of
Sabato's Crystal Ball	Safe R	November 4, 2002
New York Times	Lean R	October 14, 2002

=== Results ===
Texas's 5th congressional district, 2002
Party	Candidate	Votes	%
Republican	Jeb Hensarling	81,439	58.21
Democratic	Ron Chapman	56,330	40.26
Libertarian	Dan Michalski	1,283	0.92
Green	Thomas Kemper	856	0.61
Total votes		139,908	100
Republican win (new seat)			

== District 6 ==
2002 Texas's 6th congressional district election
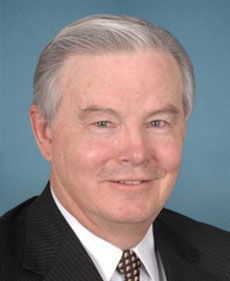

Nominee	Joe Barton	Felix Alvarado
Party	Republican	Democratic
Popular vote	115,396	45,404
Percentage	70.3%	27.7%
- County results Barton: 60–70% 70–80%
U.S. Representative before election
Joe Barton
Republican
Elected U.S. Representative
Joe Barton
Republican

Incumbent Republican Joe Barton ran for re-election.

=== Predictions ===
Source	Ranking	As of
Sabato's Crystal Ball	Safe R	November 4, 2002
New York Times	Safe R	October 14, 2002

=== Results ===
Texas's 6th congressional district, 2002
Party	Candidate	Votes	%
Republican	Joe Barton (incumbent)	115,396	70.35
Democratic	Felix Alvarado	45,404	27.68
Libertarian	Frank Brady	1,992	1.21
Green	B.J. Armstrong	1,245	0.76
Total votes		164,037	100
Republican hold			

== District 7 ==
2002 Texas's 7th congressional district election
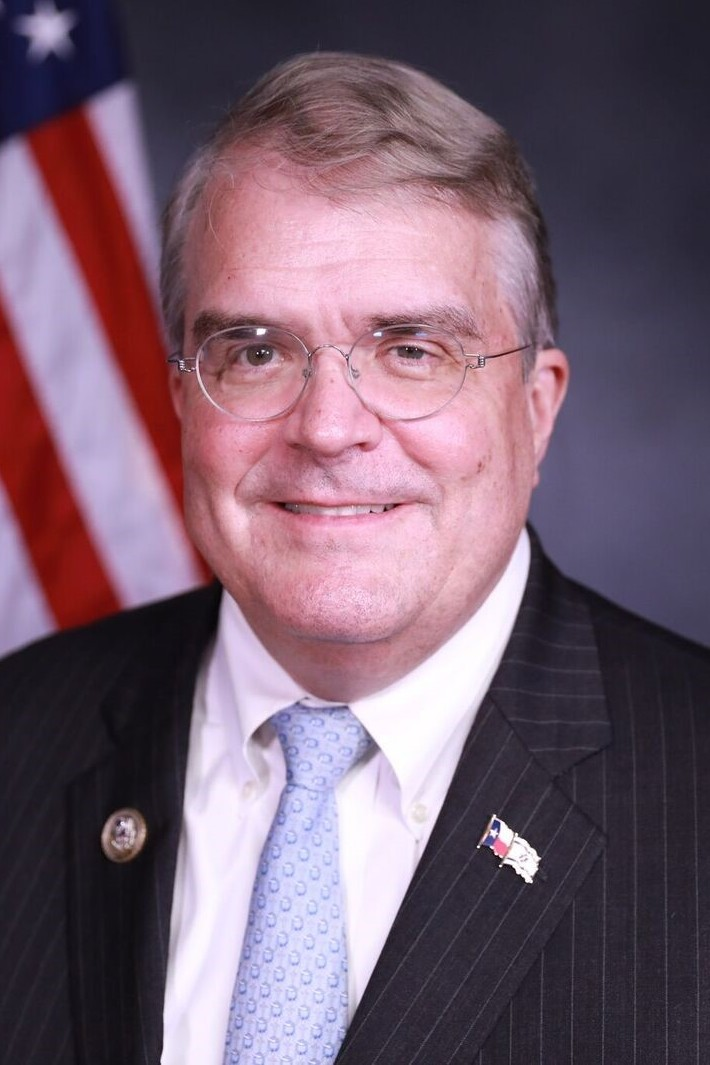

Nominee	John Culberson	Drew Parks
Party	Republican	Libertarian
Popular vote	96,795	11,674
Percentage	89.2%	10.8%
- County results Culberson: 80–90%
U.S. Representative before election
John Culberson
Republican
Elected U.S. Representative
John Culberson
Republican

Incumbent Republican John Culberson ran for re-election.

=== Predictions ===
Source	Ranking	As of
Sabato's Crystal Ball	Safe R	November 4, 2002
New York Times	Safe R	October 14, 2002

=== Results ===
Texas's 7th congressional district, 2002
Party	Candidate	Votes	%
Republican	John Culberson (incumbent)	96,795	89.19
Libertarian	Drew Parks	11,674	10.76
Write-in	John Skone-Palmer	58	0.05
Total votes		108,527	100
Republican hold			

== District 8 ==
2002 Texas's 8th congressional district election
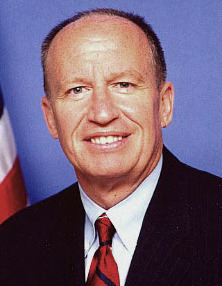

Nominee	Kevin Brady	Gil Guillory
Party	Republican	Libertarian
Popular vote	140,575	10,351
Percentage	93.1%	6.9%
- County results Brady: 90–100%
U.S. Representative before election
Kevin Brady
Republican
Elected U.S. Representative
Kevin Brady
Republican

Incumbent Republican Kevin Brady ran for re-election.

=== Predictions ===
Source	Ranking	As of
Sabato's Crystal Ball	Safe R	November 4, 2002
New York Times	Safe R	October 14, 2002

=== Results ===
Texas's 8th congressional district, 2002
Party	Candidate	Votes	%
Republican	Kevin Brady (incumbent)	140,575	93.14
Libertarian	Gil Guillory	10,351	6.86
Total votes		150,926	100
Republican hold			

== District 9 ==
2002 Texas's 9th congressional district election
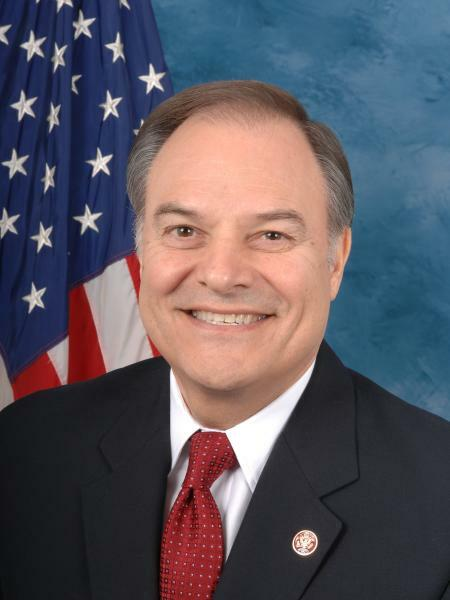

Nominee	Nick Lampson	Paul Williams
Party	Democratic	Republican
Popular vote	86,710	59,635
Percentage	58.6%	40.3%
- County results Williams: 50–60% 60–70% Lampson: 50–60% 70–80%
U.S. Representative before election
Nick Lampson
Democratic
Elected U.S. Representative
Nick Lampson
Democratic

Incumbent Democrat Nick Lampson ran for re-election.

=== Predictions ===
Source	Ranking	As of
Sabato's Crystal Ball	Safe D	November 4, 2002
New York Times	Safe D	October 14, 2002

=== Results ===
Texas's 9th congressional district, 2002
Party	Candidate	Votes	%
Democratic	Nick Lampson (incumbent)	86,710	58.60
Republican	Paul Williams	59,635	40.31
Libertarian	Dean Tucker	1,613	1.09
Total votes		147,958	100
Democratic hold			

== District 10 ==
2002 Texas's 10th congressional district election
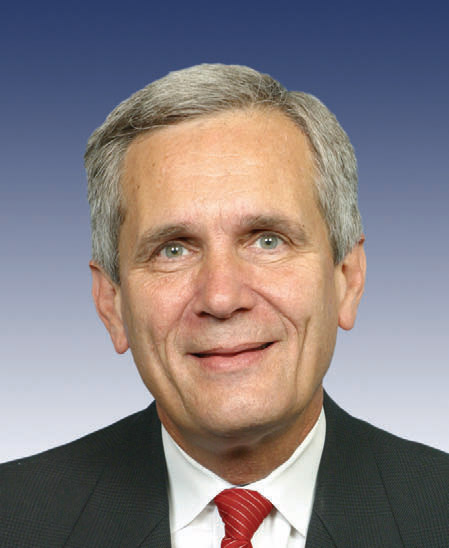

Nominee	Lloyd Doggett	Michele Messina
Party	Democratic	Libertarian
Popular vote	114,428	21,196
Percentage	84.4%	15.6%
- County results Doggett: 80–90%
U.S. Representative before election
Lloyd Doggett
Democratic
Elected U.S. Representative
Lloyd Doggett
Democratic

Incumbent Democrat Lloyd Doggett ran for re-election.

=== Predictions ===
Source	Ranking	As of
Sabato's Crystal Ball	Safe D	November 4, 2002
New York Times	Safe D	October 14, 2002

=== Results ===
Texas's 10th congressional district, 2002
Party	Candidate	Votes	%
Democratic	Lloyd Doggett (incumbent)	114,428	84.37
Libertarian	Michele Messina	21,196	15.63
Total votes		135,624	100
Democratic hold			

== District 11 ==
2002 Texas's 11th congressional district election
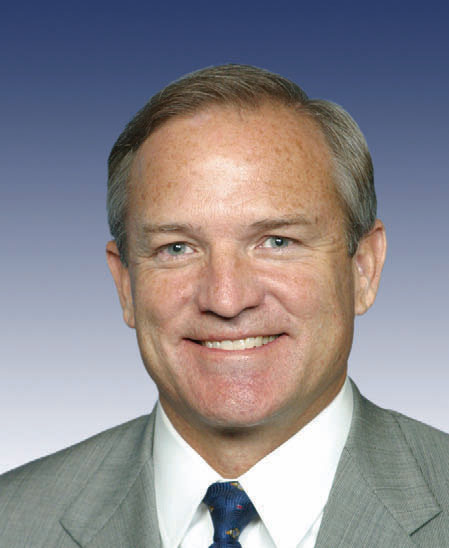

Nominee	Chet Edwards	Ramsey Farley
Party	Democratic	Republican
Popular vote	74,678	68,236
Percentage	51.6%	47.1%
- County results Farley: 50–60% 60–70% Taylor: 50–60% 60–70%
U.S. Representative before election
Chet Edwards
Democratic
Elected U.S. Representative
Chet Edwards
Democratic

Incumbent Democrat Chet Edwards ran for re-election.

=== Predictions ===
Source	Ranking	As of
Sabato's Crystal Ball	Safe D	November 4, 2002
New York Times	Safe D	October 14, 2002

=== Results ===
Texas's 11th congressional district, 2002
Party	Candidate	Votes	%
Democratic	Chet Edwards (incumbent)	74,678	51.55
Republican	Ramsey Farley	68,236	47.11
Libertarian	Andrew Farris	1,943	1.34
Total votes		144,857	100
Democratic hold			

== District 12 ==
2002 Texas's 12th congressional district election
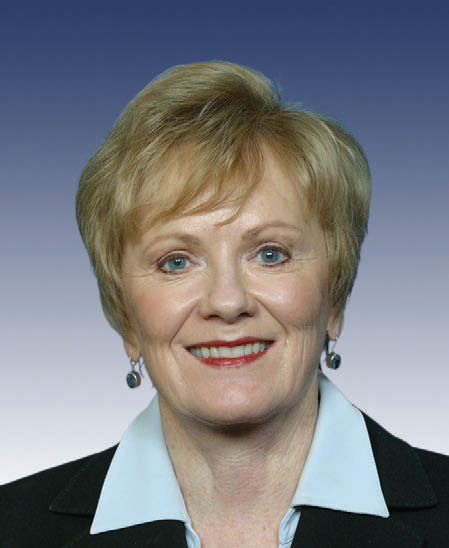

Nominee	Kay Granger	Edward Hanson
Party	Republican	Libertarian
Popular vote	121,208	10,723
Percentage	91.9%	8.1%
- County results Granger: 90–100%
U.S. Representative before election
Kay Granger
Republican
Elected U.S. Representative
Kay Granger
Republican

Incumbent Republican Kay Granger ran for re-election.

=== Predictions ===
Source	Ranking	As of
Sabato's Crystal Ball	Safe R	November 4, 2002
New York Times	Safe R	October 14, 2002

=== Results ===
Texas's 12th congressional district, 2002
Party	Candidate	Votes	%
Republican	Kay Granger (incumbent)	121,208	91.87
Libertarian	Edward Hanson	10,723	8.13
Total votes		131,931	100
Republican hold			

== District 13 ==
2002 Texas's 13th congressional district election
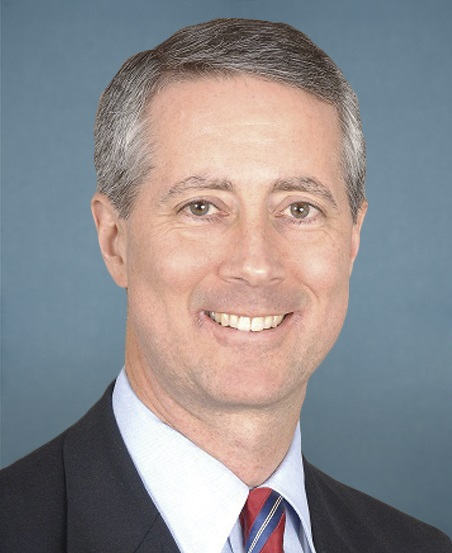

Nominee	Mac Thornberry	Zane Reese
Party	Republican	Democratic
Popular vote	119,401	31,218
Percentage	79.3%	20.7%
- County results Thornberry: 50–60% 60–70% 70–80% 80–90% >90%
U.S. Representative before election
Mac Thornberry
Republican
Elected U.S. Representative
Mac Thornberry
Republican

Incumbent Republican Mac Thornberry ran for re-election.

=== Predictions ===
Source	Ranking	As of
Sabato's Crystal Ball	Safe R	November 4, 2002
New York Times	Safe R	October 14, 2002

=== Results ===
Texas's 13th congressional district, 2002
Party	Candidate	Votes	%
Republican	Mac Thornberry (incumbent)	119,401	79.27
Democratic	Zane Reese	31,218	20.73
Total votes		150,619	100
Republican hold			

== District 14 ==
2002 Texas's 14th congressional district election
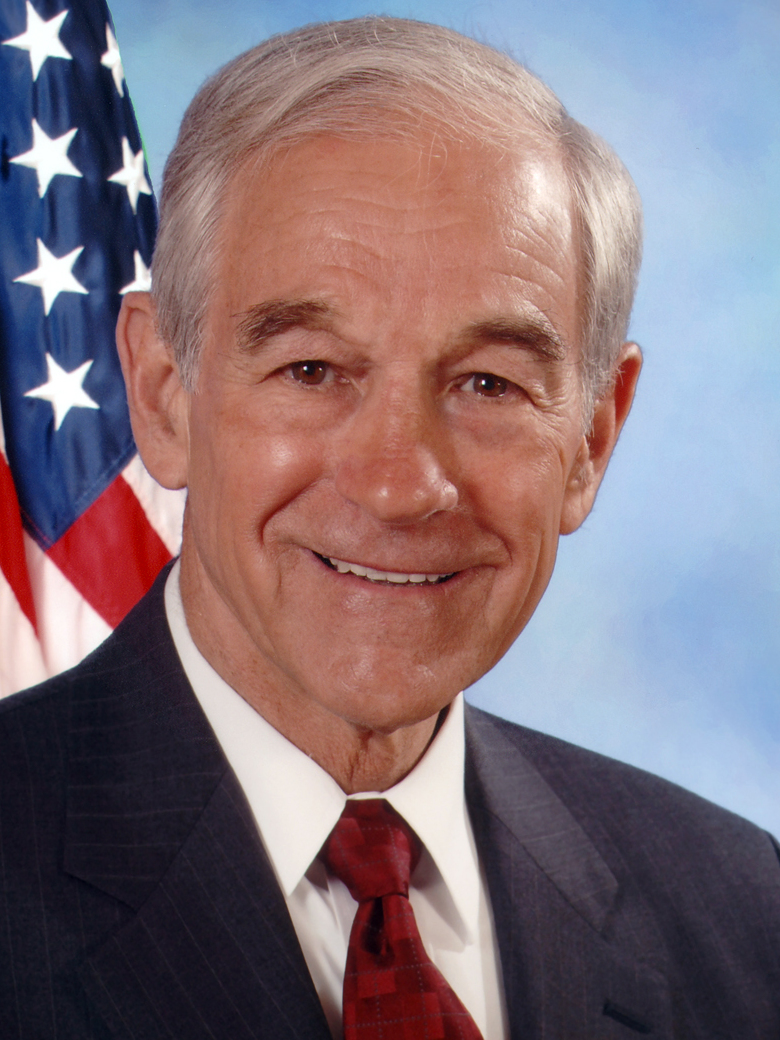

Nominee	Ron Paul	Corby Windham
Party	Republican	Democratic
Popular vote	102,905	48,224
Percentage	68.1%	31.9%
- County results Paul: 50–60% 60–70% 70–80%
U.S. Representative before election
Ron Paul
Republican
Elected U.S. Representative
Ron Paul
Republican

Incumbent Republican Ron Paul ran for re-election.

=== Predictions ===
Source	Ranking	As of
Sabato's Crystal Ball	Safe R	November 4, 2002
New York Times	Safe R	October 14, 2002

=== Results ===
Texas's 14th congressional district, 2002
Party	Candidate	Votes	%
Republican	Ron Paul (incumbent)	102,905	68.09
Democratic	Corby Windham	48,224	31.91
Total votes		151,129	100
Republican hold			

== District 15 ==
2002 Texas's 15th congressional district election
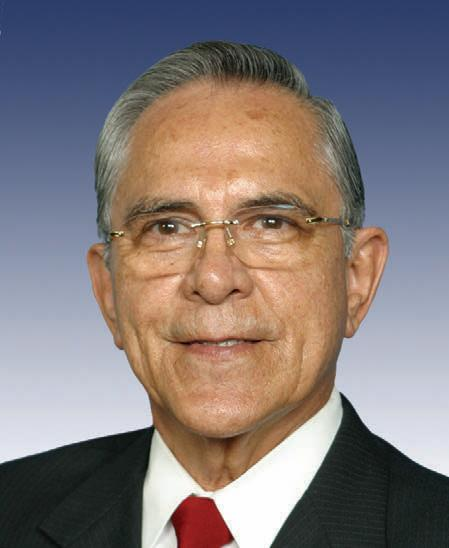
Nominee	Ruben Hinojosa
Party	Democratic
Popular vote	66,311
Percentage	100.0%
U.S. Representative before election
Ruben Hinojosa
Democratic
Elected U.S. Representative
Ruben Hinojosa
Democratic

Incumbent Democrat Ruben Hinojosa ran for re-election unopposed.

=== Predictions ===
Source	Ranking	As of
Sabato's Crystal Ball	Safe D	November 4, 2002
New York Times	Safe D	October 14, 2002

=== Results ===
Texas's 15th congressional district, 2002
Party	Candidate	Votes	%
Democratic	Ruben Hinojosa (incumbent)	66,311	100.00
Total votes		66,311	100
Democratic hold			

== District 16 ==
2002 Texas's 16th congressional district election
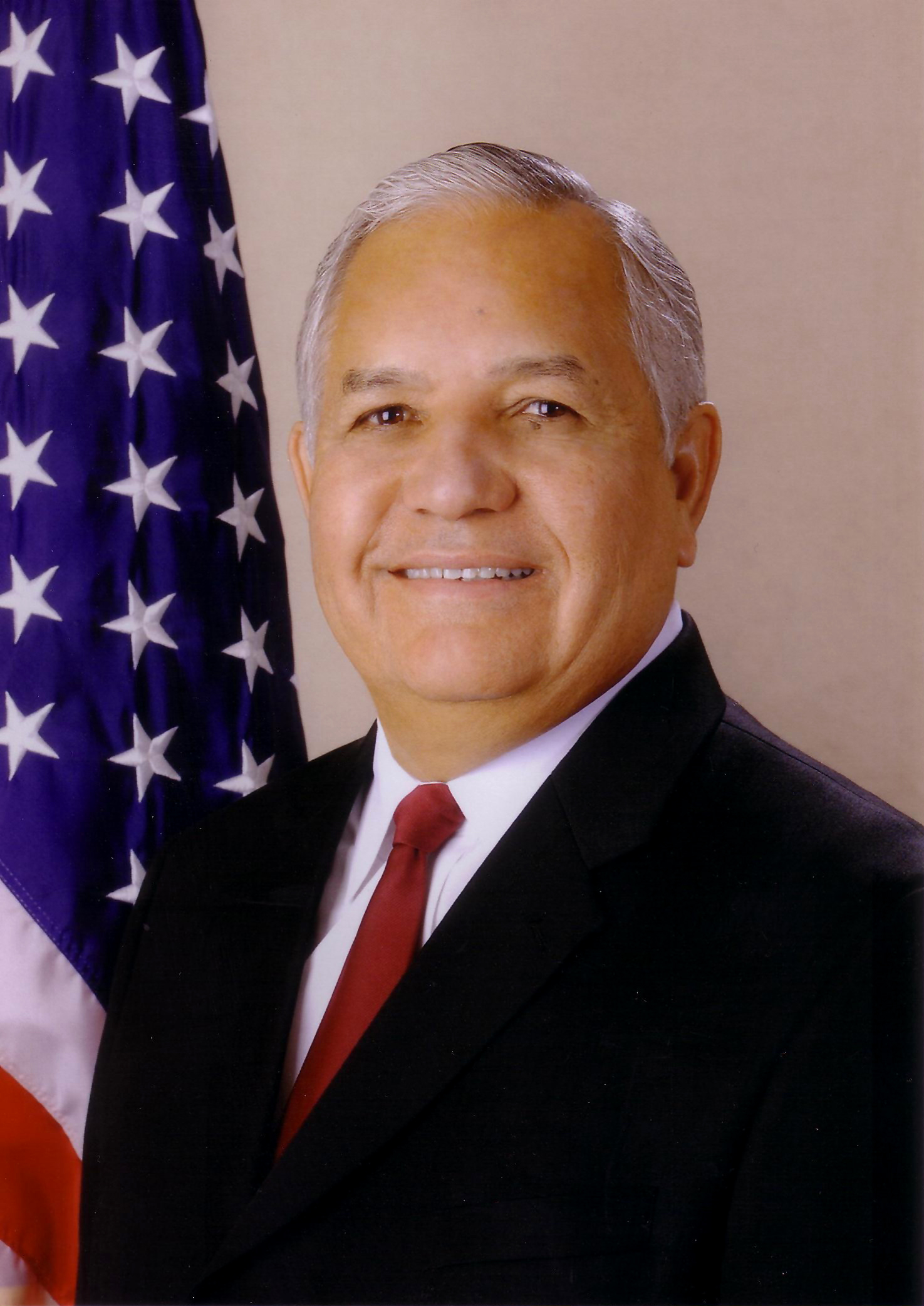
Nominee	Silvestre Reyes
Party	Democratic
Popular vote	72,383
Percentage	100.0%
U.S. Representative before election
Silvestre Reyes
Democratic
Elected U.S. Representative
Silvestre Reyes
Democratic

Incumbent Democrat Silvestre Reyes ran for re-election unopposed.

=== Predictions ===
Source	Ranking	As of
Sabato's Crystal Ball	Safe D	November 4, 2002
New York Times	Safe D	October 14, 2002

=== Results ===
Texas's 16th congressional district, 2002
Party	Candidate	Votes	%
Democratic	Silvestre Reyes (incumbent)	72,383	100.00
Total votes		72,383	100
Democratic hold			

== District 17 ==
2002 Texas's 17th congressional district election
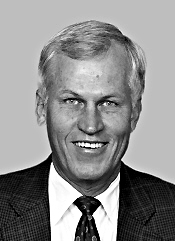

Nominee	Charles Stenholm	Rob Beckham
Party	Democratic	Republican
Popular vote	84,136	77,622
Percentage	51.4%	47.4%
- County results Stenholm: 50–60% 60–70% 70–80% Beckham: 40–50% 50–60% 60–70%
U.S. Representative before election
Charles Stenholm
Democratic
Elected U.S. Representative
Charles Stenholm
Democratic

Incumbent Democrat Charles Stenholm ran for re-election.

=== Predictions ===
Source	Ranking	As of
Sabato's Crystal Ball	Safe D	November 4, 2002
New York Times	Safe D	October 14, 2002

=== Results ===
Texas's 17th congressional district, 2002
Party	Candidate	Votes	%
Democratic	Charles Stenholm (incumbent)	84,136	51.36
Republican	Rob Beckham	77,622	47.39
Libertarian	Fred Jones	2,046	1.25
Total votes		163,804	100
Democratic hold			

== District 18 ==
2002 Texas's 18th congressional district election
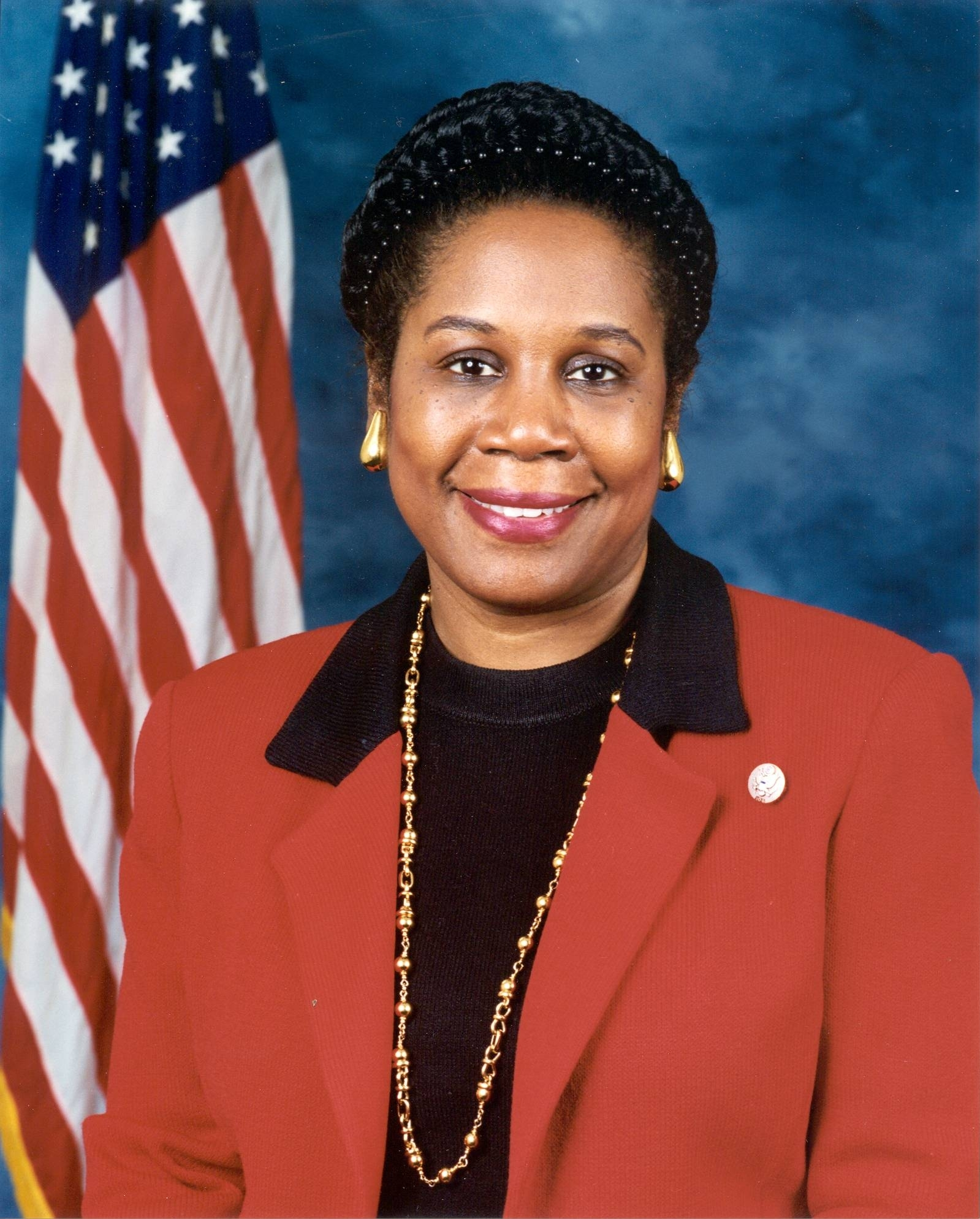

Nominee	Sheila Jackson Lee	Phillip Abbott
Party	Democratic	Republican
Popular vote	99,161	27,980
Percentage	76.9%	21.7%
- County results Lee: 70–80%
U.S. Representative before election
Sheila Jackson Lee
Democratic
Elected U.S. Representative
Sheila Jackson Lee
Democratic

Incumbent Democrat Sheila Jackson Lee ran for re-election.

=== Predictions ===
Source	Ranking	As of
Sabato's Crystal Ball	Safe D	November 4, 2002
New York Times	Safe D	October 14, 2002

=== Results ===
Texas's 18th congressional district, 2002
Party	Candidate	Votes	%
Democratic	Sheila Jackson Lee (incumbent)	99,161	76.91
Republican	Phillip Abbott	27,980	21.70
Libertarian	Brent Sullivan	1,785	1.38
Total votes		128,926	100
Democratic hold			

== District 19 ==
2002 Texas's 19th congressional district election
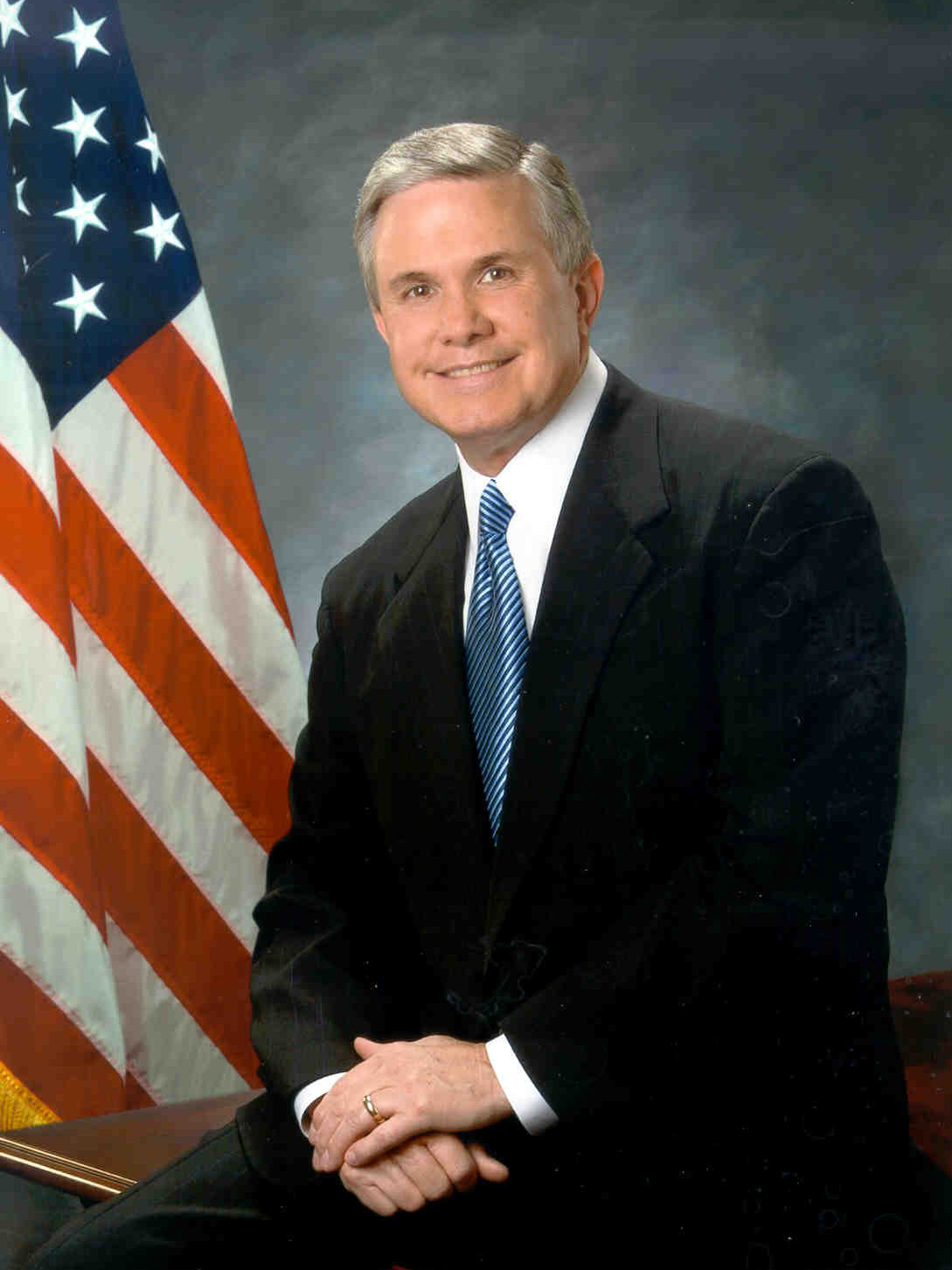

Nominee	Larry Combest	Larry Johnson
Party	Republican	Libertarian
Popular vote	117,092	10,684
Percentage	91.6%	8.4%
- County results Combest: 80–90% 90–100% 100–100%
U.S. Representative before election
Larry Combest
Republican
Elected U.S. Representative
Larry Combest
Republican

Incumbent Republican Larry Combest ran for re-election.

=== Predictions ===
Source	Ranking	As of
Sabato's Crystal Ball	Safe R	November 4, 2002
New York Times	Safe R	October 14, 2002

=== Results ===
Texas's 19th congressional district, 2002
Party	Candidate	Votes	%
Republican	Larry Combest (incumbent)	117,092	91.64
Libertarian	Larry Johnson	10,684	8.36
Total votes		127,776	100
Republican hold			

== District 20 ==
2002 Texas's 20th congressional district election
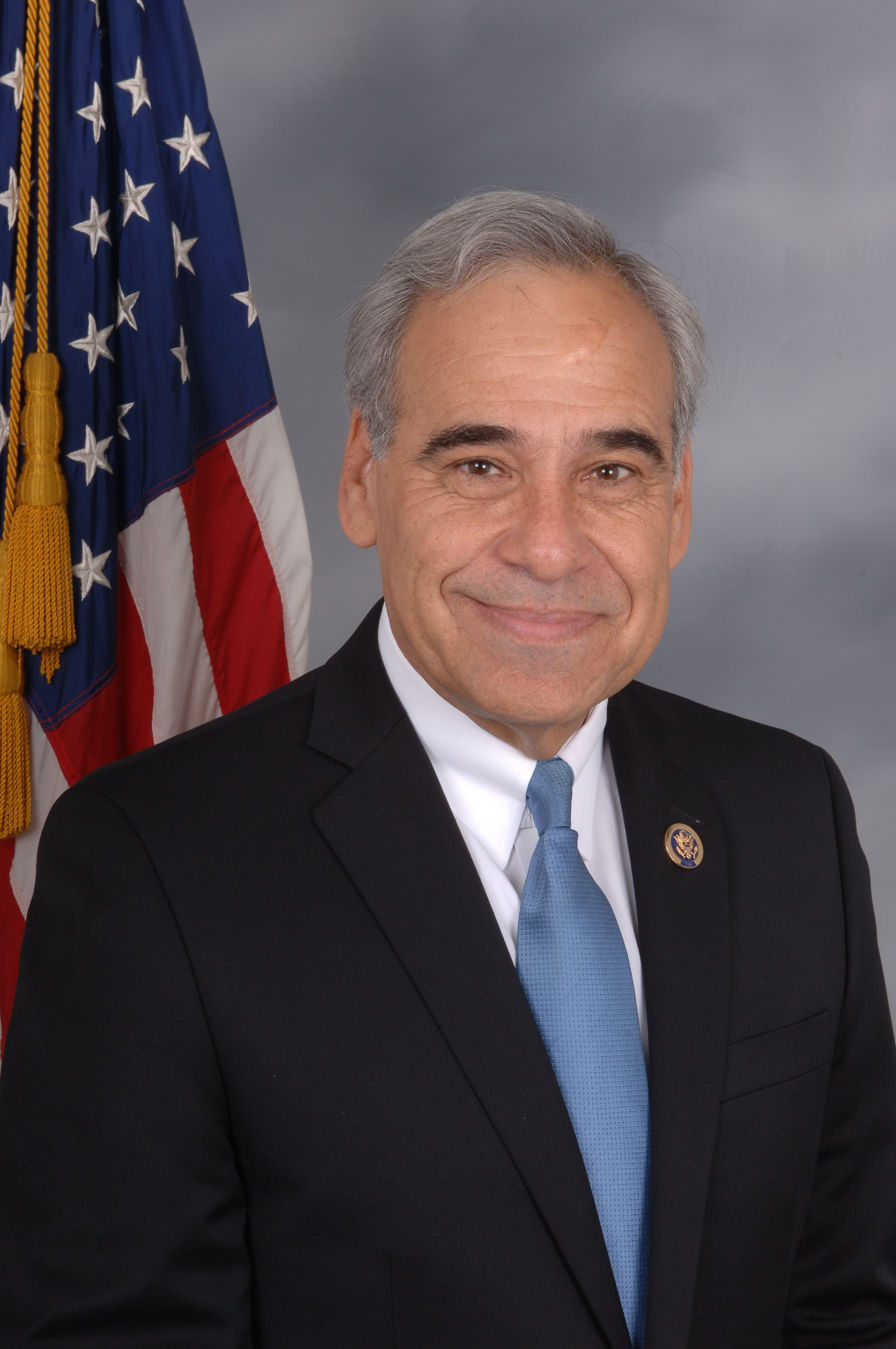
Nominee	Charlie Gonzalez
Party	Democratic
Popular vote	68,685
Percentage	100.0%
U.S. Representative before election
Charlie Gonzalez
Democratic
Elected U.S. Representative
Charlie Gonzalez
Democratic

Incumbent Democrat Charlie Gonzalez ran for re-election unopposed.

=== Predictions ===
Source	Ranking	As of
Sabato's Crystal Ball	Safe D	November 4, 2002
New York Times	Safe D	October 14, 2002

=== Results ===
Texas's 20th congressional district, 2002
Party	Candidate	Votes	%
Democratic	Charlie Gonzalez (incumbent)	68,685	100.00
Total votes		68,685	100
Democratic hold			

== District 21 ==
2002 Texas's 21st congressional district election
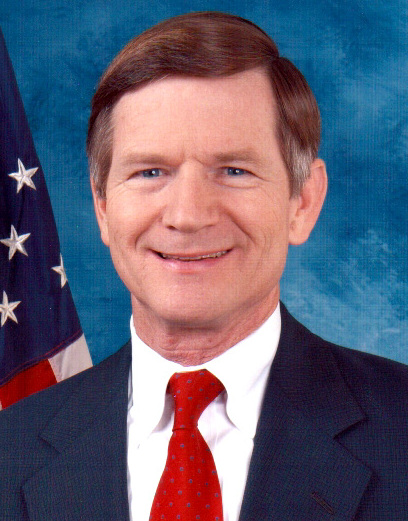

Nominee	Lamar Smith	John Courage
Party	Republican	Democratic
Popular vote	161,836	56,206
Percentage	72.9%	25.3%
- County results Smith: 60–70% 70–80% 80–90%
U.S. Representative before election
Lamar Smith
Republican
Elected U.S. Representative
Lamar Smith
Republican

Incumbent Republican Lamar Smith ran for re-election.

=== Predictions ===
Source	Ranking	As of
Sabato's Crystal Ball	Safe R	November 4, 2002
New York Times	Safe R	October 14, 2002

=== Results ===
Texas's 21st congressional district, 2002
Party	Candidate	Votes	%
Republican	Lamar Smith (incumbent)	161,836	72.87
Democratic	John Courage	56,206	25.31
Libertarian	DG Roberts	4,051	1.82
Total votes		222,093	100
Republican hold			

== District 22 ==
2002 Texas's 22nd congressional district election
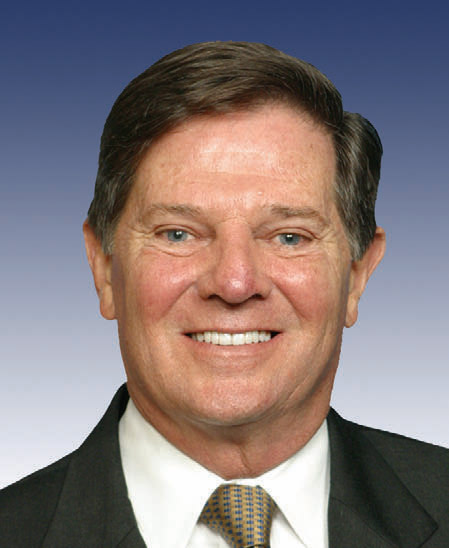

Nominee	Tom DeLay	Tim Riley
Party	Republican	Democratic
Popular vote	100,499	55,716
Percentage	63.2%	35.0%
- County results Delay: 60–70%
U.S. Representative before election
Tom DeLay
Republican
Elected U.S. Representative
Tom DeLay
Republican

Incumbent Republican Tom DeLay ran for re-election.

=== Predictions ===
Source	Ranking	As of
Sabato's Crystal Ball	Safe R	November 4, 2002
New York Times	Safe R	October 14, 2002

=== Results ===
Texas's 22nd congressional district, 2002
Party	Candidate	Votes	%
Republican	Tom DeLay (incumbent)	100,499	63.17
Democratic	Tim Riley	55,716	35.02
Libertarian	Jerry LaFleur	1,612	1.01
Green	Joel West	1,257	0.79
Total votes		159,084	100
Republican hold			

== District 23 ==
2002 Texas's 23rd congressional district election
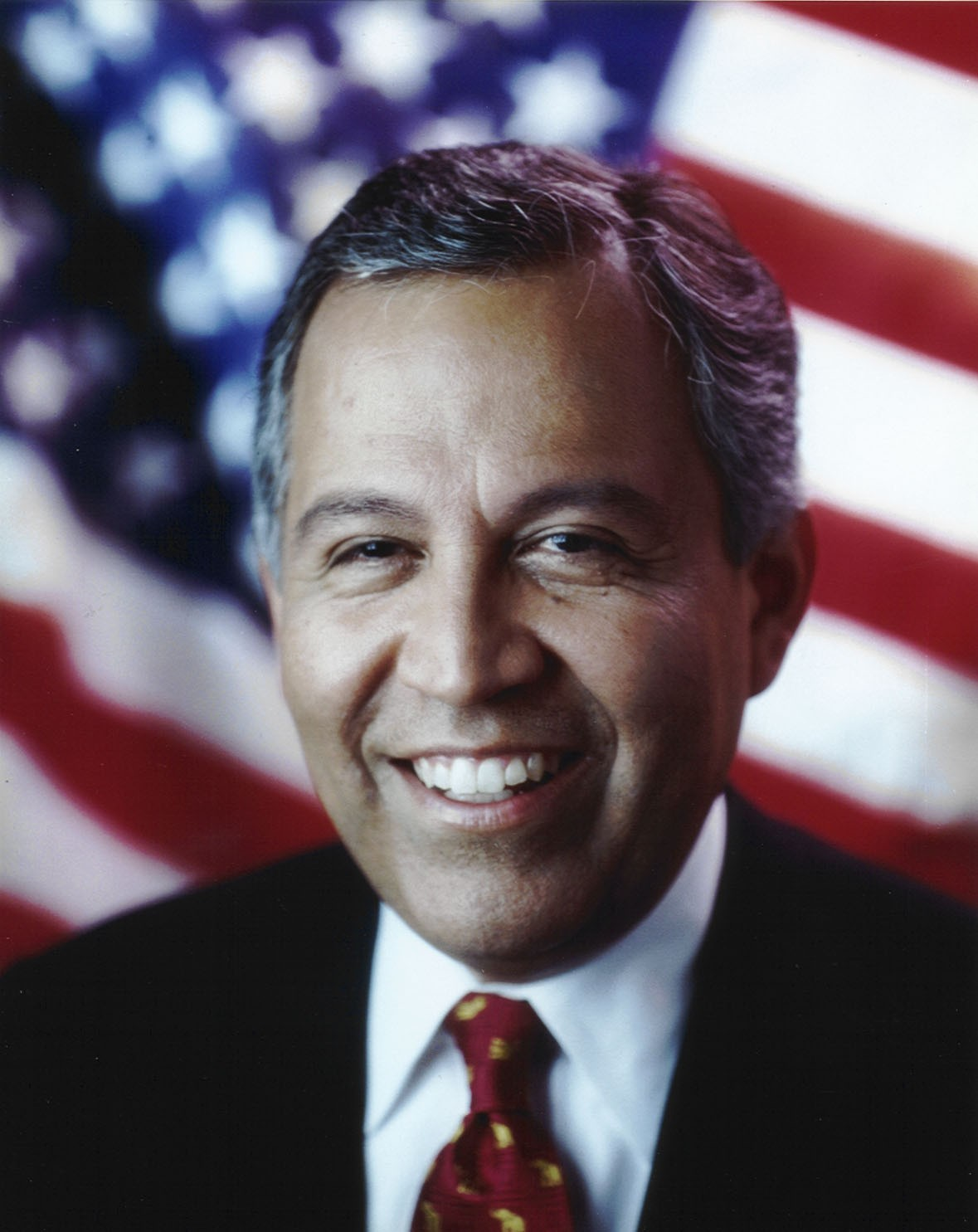

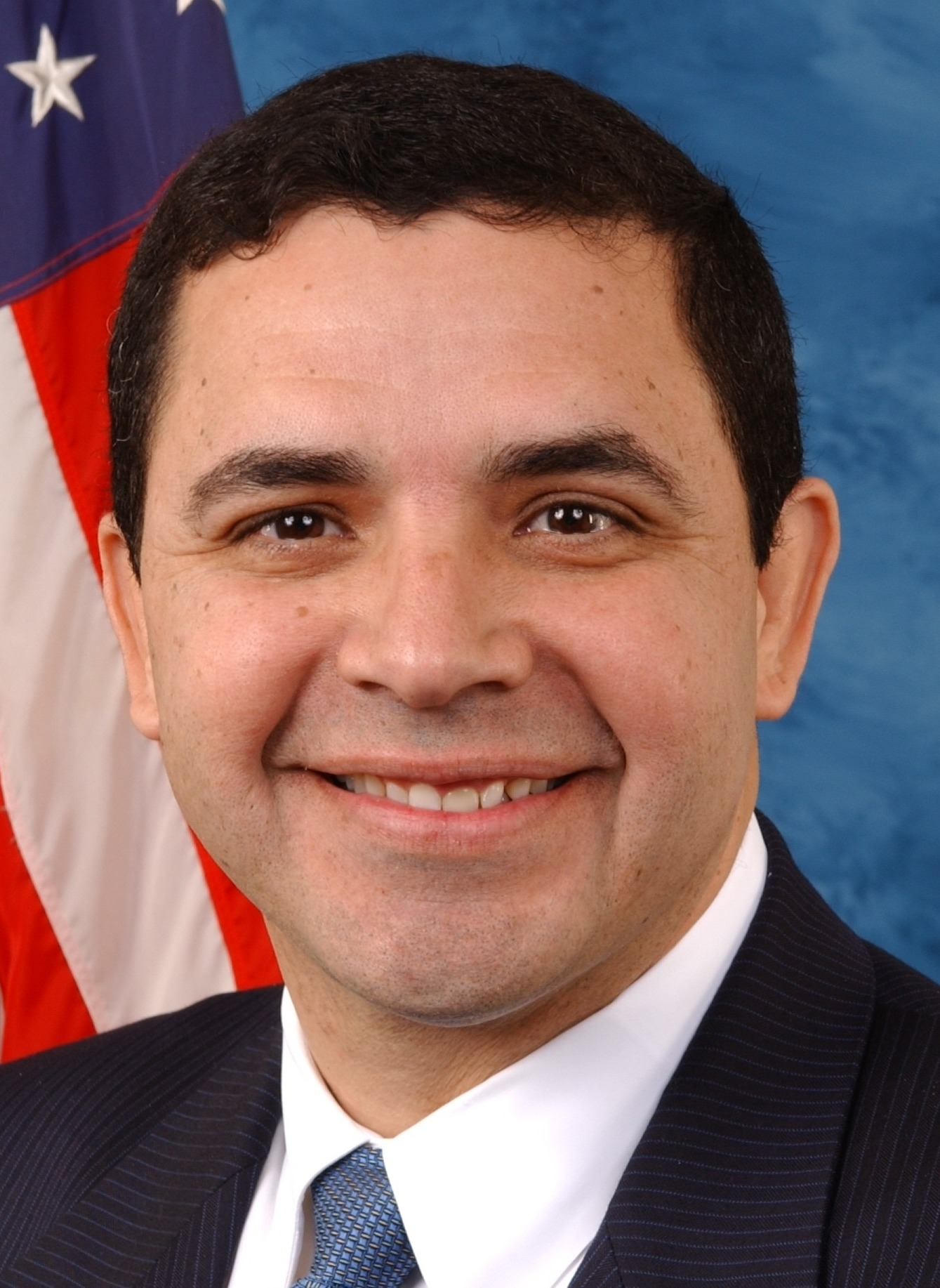
Nominee	Henry Bonilla	Henry Cuellar
Party	Republican	Democratic
Popular vote	77,573	71,067
Percentage	51.5%	47.2%
- County results Bonilla: 50–60% 60–70% 70–80% 80–90% Cuellar: 50–60% 60–70% 70–80% 80–90%
U.S. Representative before election
Henry Bonilla
Republican
Elected U.S. Representative
Henry Bonilla
Republican

Incumbent Republican Henry Bonilla ran for re-election, defeating former Texas Secretary of State Henry Cuellar.

=== Predictions ===
Source	Ranking	As of
Sabato's Crystal Ball	Lean R	November 4, 2002
New York Times	Safe R	October 14, 2002

=== Results ===
Texas's 23rd congressional district, 2002
Party	Candidate	Votes	%
Republican	Henry Bonilla (incumbent)	77,573	51.53
Democratic	Henry Cuellar	71,067	47.20
Libertarian	Jeffrey Blunt	1,106	0.73
Green	Ed Scharf	806	0.54
Total votes		150,552	100
Republican hold			

== District 24 ==
2002 Texas's 24th congressional district election
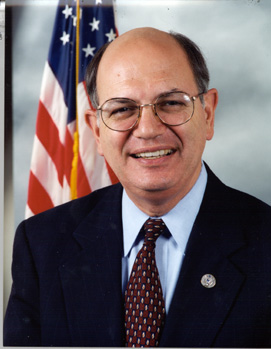

Nominee	Martin Frost	Mike Ortega
Party	Democratic	Republican
Popular vote	73,002	38,332
Percentage	64.7%	34.0%
- County results Frost: 60–70%
U.S. Representative before election
Martin Frost
Democratic
Elected U.S. Representative
Martin Frost
Democratic

Incumbent Democrat Martin Frost ran for re-election.

=== Predictions ===
Source	Ranking	As of
Sabato's Crystal Ball	Safe D	November 4, 2002
New York Times	Safe D	October 14, 2002

=== Results ===
Texas's 24th congressional district, 2002
Party	Candidate	Votes	%
Democratic	Martin Frost (incumbent)	73,002	64.66
Republican	Mike Ortega	38,332	33.95
Libertarian	Ken Ashby	1,560	1.38
Total votes		112,894	100
Democratic hold			

== District 25 ==
2002 Texas's 25th congressional district election
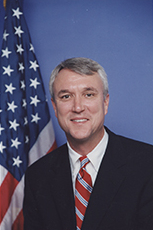

Nominee	Chris Bell	Tom Reiser
Party	Democratic	Republican
Popular vote	63,590	50,041
Percentage	54.8%	43.1%
- County results Bell: 50–60% 80–90%
U.S. Representative before election
Ken Bentsen
Democratic
Elected U.S. Representative
Chris Bell
Democratic

Incumbent Democrat Ken Bentsen retired to run for US Senate.

=== Predictions ===
Source	Ranking	As of
Sabato's Crystal Ball	Safe D	November 4, 2002
New York Times	Safe D	October 14, 2002

=== Results ===
Texas's 25th congressional district, 2002
Party	Candidate	Votes	%
Democratic	Chris Bell	63,590	54.76
Republican	Tom Reiser	50,041	43.09
Green	George Reiter	1,399	1.20
Libertarian	Guy McLendon	1,096	0.94
Total votes		116,126	100
Democratic hold			

== District 26 ==
2002 Texas's 26th congressional district election
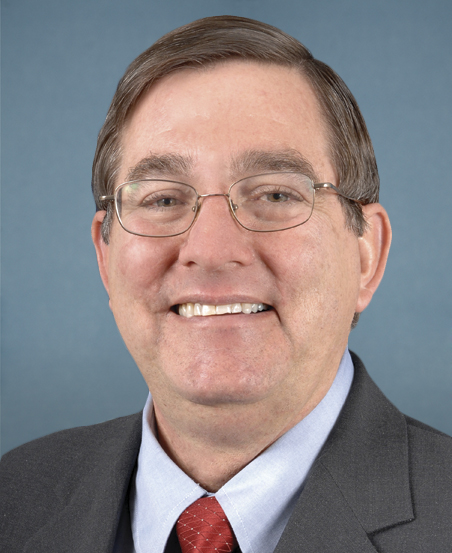

Nominee	Michael Burgess	Paul William LeBon
Party	Republican	Democratic
Popular vote	123,195	37,485
Percentage	74.8%	22.8%
- County results Burgess: 60–70% 70–80% 80–90%
U.S. Representative before election
Dick Armey
Republican
Elected U.S. Representative
Michael Burgess
Republican

Incumbent Republican Dick Armey opted to retire rather than run for re-election.

=== Predictions ===
Source	Ranking	As of
Sabato's Crystal Ball	Safe R	November 4, 2002
New York Times	Safe R	October 14, 2002

=== Results ===
Texas's 26th congressional district, 2002
Party	Candidate	Votes	%
Republican	Michael Burgess	123,195	74.81
Democratic	Paul William LeBon	37,485	22.76
Libertarian	David Croft	2,367	1.44
Green	Gary Page	1,631	0.99
Total votes		164,678	100
Republican hold			

== District 27 ==
2002 Texas's 27th congressional district election
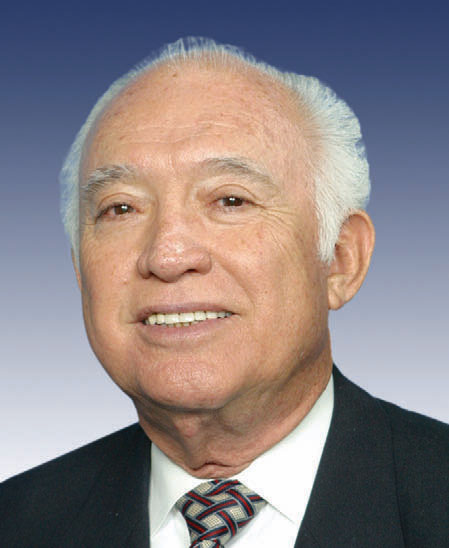

Nominee	Solomon Ortiz	Pat Ahumada
Party	Democratic	Republican
Popular vote	68,559	41,004
Percentage	61.1%	36.5%
- County results Ortiz: 50–60% 60–70% 80–90%
U.S. Representative before election
Solomon Ortiz
Democratic
Elected U.S. Representative
Solomon Ortiz
Democratic

Incumbent Democrat Solomon Ortiz ran for re-election.

=== Predictions ===
Source	Ranking	As of
Sabato's Crystal Ball	Safe D	November 4, 2002
New York Times	Safe D	October 14, 2002

=== Results ===
Texas's 27th congressional district, 2002
Party	Candidate	Votes	%
Democratic	Solomon Ortiz (incumbent)	68,559	61.10
Republican	Pat Ahumada	41,004	36.54
Libertarian	Christopher Claytor	2,646	2.36
Total votes		112,209	100
Democratic hold			

== District 28 ==
2002 Texas's 28th congressional district election
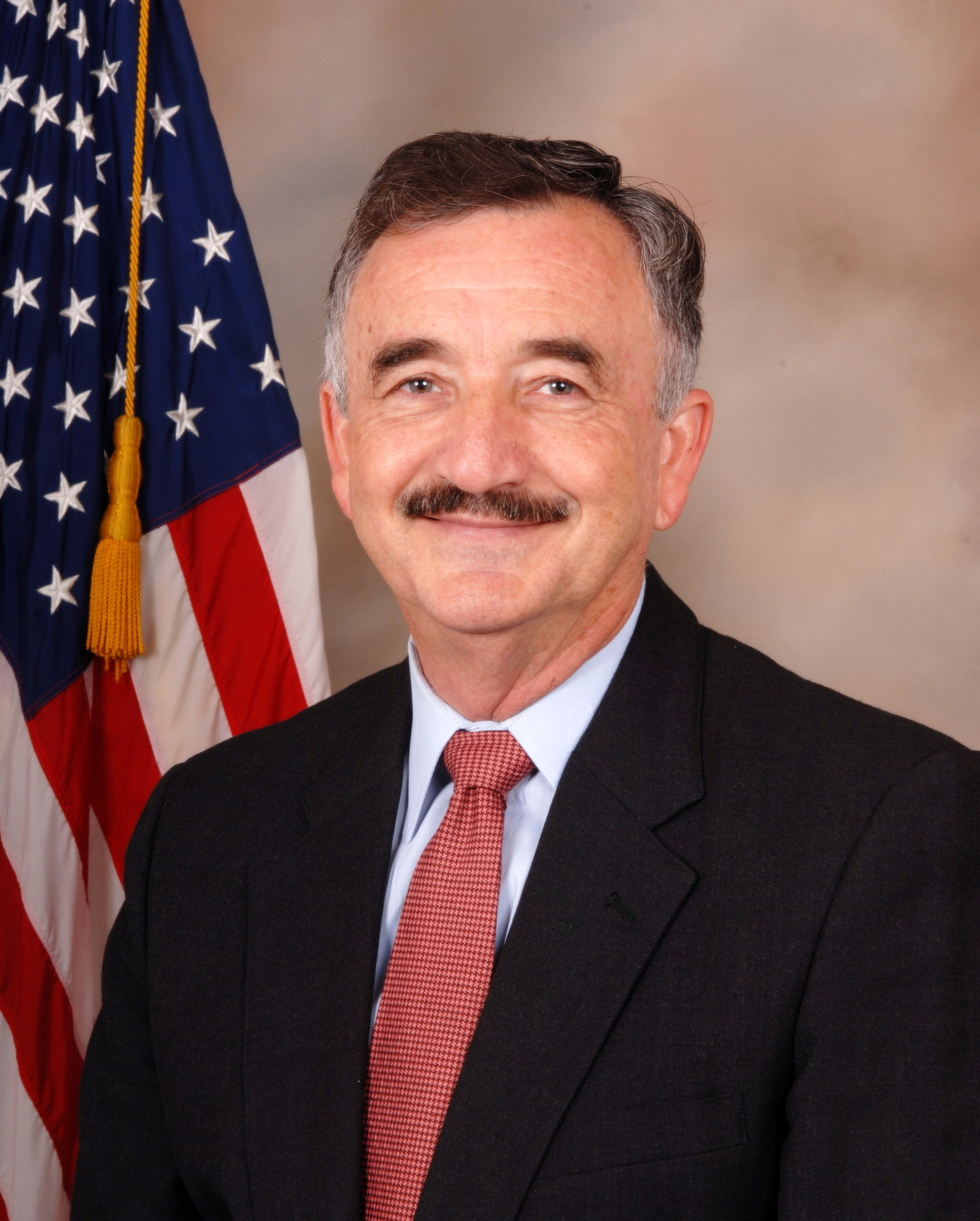

Nominee	Ciro Rodriguez	Gabriel Perales Jr.
Party	Democratic	Republican
Popular vote	71,393	26,973
Percentage	71.1%	26.9%
- County results Rodriguez: 60–70% 70–80% 80–90% 90–100% Gabriel Perales: 50–60%
U.S. Representative before election
Ciro Rodriguez
Democratic
Elected U.S. Representative
Ciro Rodriguez
Democratic

Incumbent Democrat Ciro Rodriquez ran for re-election.

=== Predictions ===
Source	Ranking	As of
Sabato's Crystal Ball	Safe D	November 4, 2002
New York Times	Safe D	October 14, 2002

=== Results ===
Texas's 28th congressional district, 2002
Party	Candidate	Votes	%
Democratic	Ciro Rodriguez (incumbent)	71,393	71.09
Republican	Gabriel Perales Jr.	26,973	26.86
Libertarian	Bill Stallknecht	2,054	2.05
Total votes		100,420	100
Democratic hold			

== District 29 ==
2002 Texas's 29th congressional district election
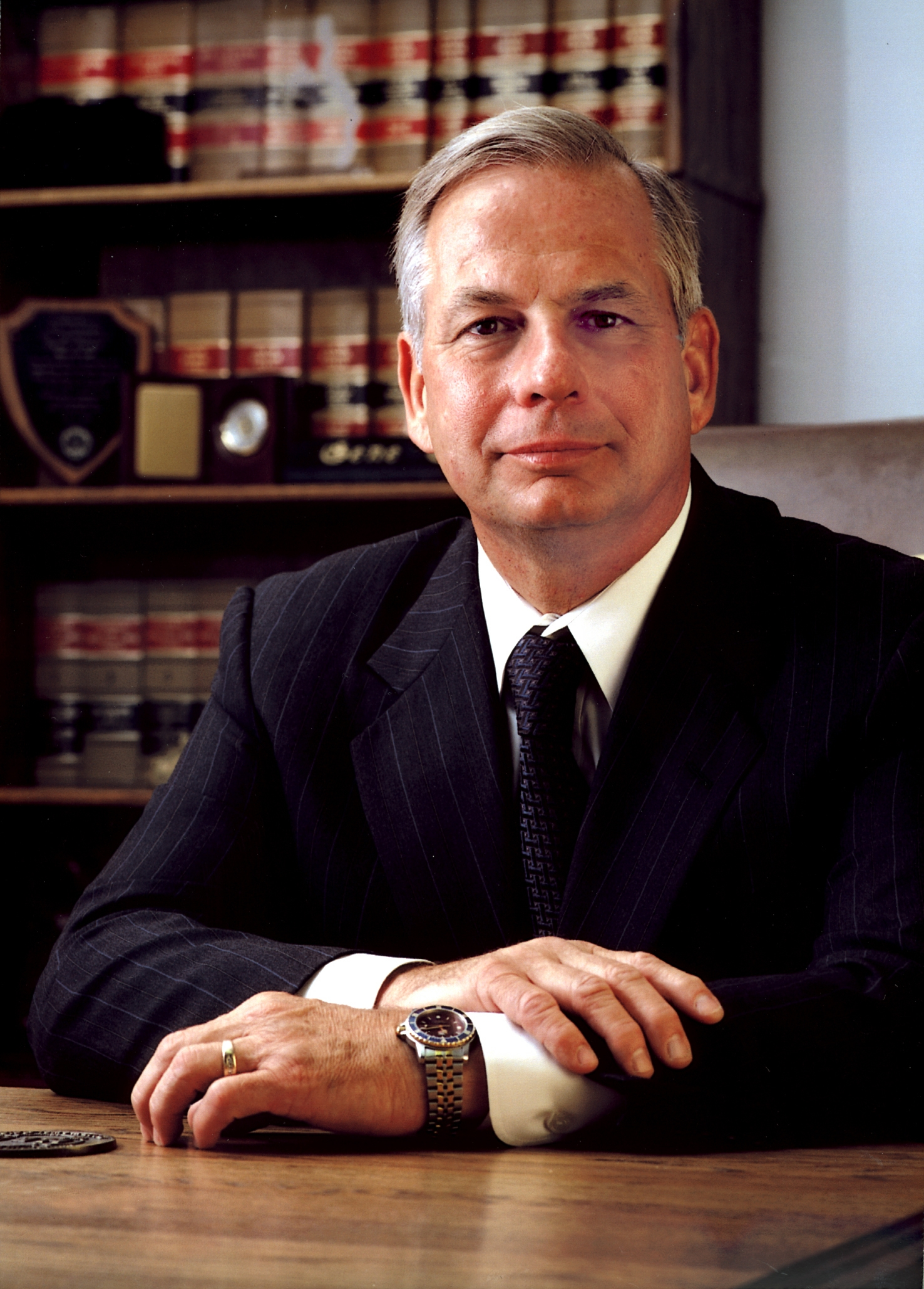

Nominee	Gene Green	Paul Hansen
Party	Democratic	Libertarian
Popular vote	55,760	2,833
Percentage	95.2%	4.8%
- County results Green: 90–100%
U.S. Representative before election
Gene Green
Democratic
Elected U.S. Representative
Gene Green
Democratic

Incumbent Democrat Gene Green ran for re-election.

=== Predictions ===
Source	Ranking	As of
Sabato's Crystal Ball	Safe D	November 4, 2002
New York Times	Safe D	October 14, 2002

=== Results ===
Texas's 29th congressional district, 2002
Party	Candidate	Votes	%
Democratic	Gene Green (incumbent)	55,760	95.16
Libertarian	Paul Hansen	2,833	4.84
Total votes		58,593	100
Democratic hold			

== District 30 ==
2002 Texas's 30th congressional district election
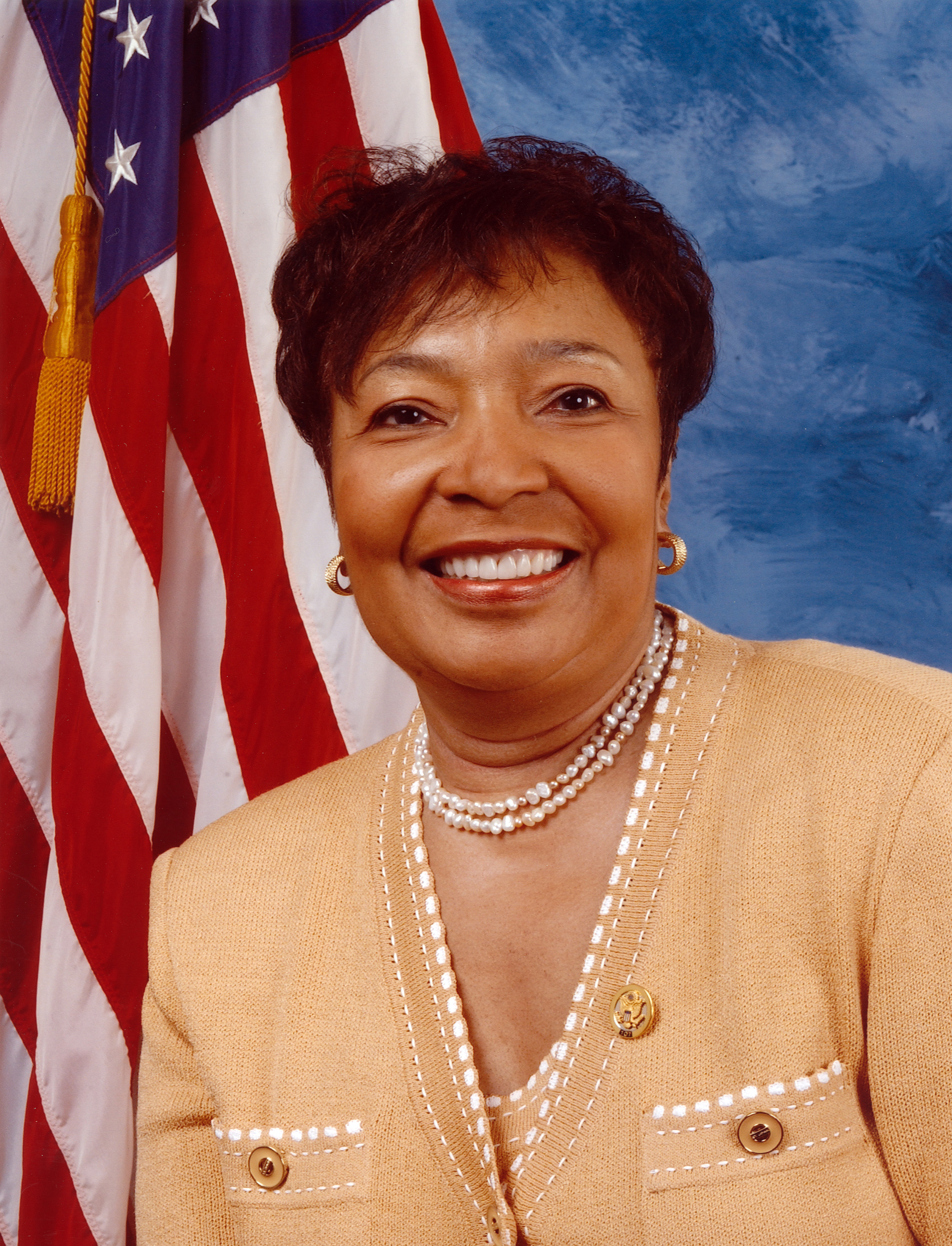

Nominee	Eddie Bernice Johnson	Ron Bush
Party	Democratic	Republican
Popular vote	88,980	28,981
Percentage	74.3%	24.2%
- County results Johnson: 70–80%
U.S. Representative before election
Eddie Bernice Johnson
Democratic
Elected U.S. Representative
Eddie Bernice Johnson
Democratic

Incumbent Democrat Eddie Bernice Johnson ran for re-election.

=== Predictions ===
Source	Ranking	As of
Sabato's Crystal Ball	Safe D	November 4, 2002
New York Times	Safe D	October 14, 2002

=== Results ===
Texas's 30th congressional district, 2002
Party	Candidate	Votes	%
Democratic	Eddie Bernice Johnson (incumbent)	88,980	74.26
Republican	Ron Bush	28,981	24.19
Libertarian	Lance Flores	1,856	1.55
Total votes		119,817	100
Democratic hold			

== District 31 ==
2002 Texas's 31st congressional district election
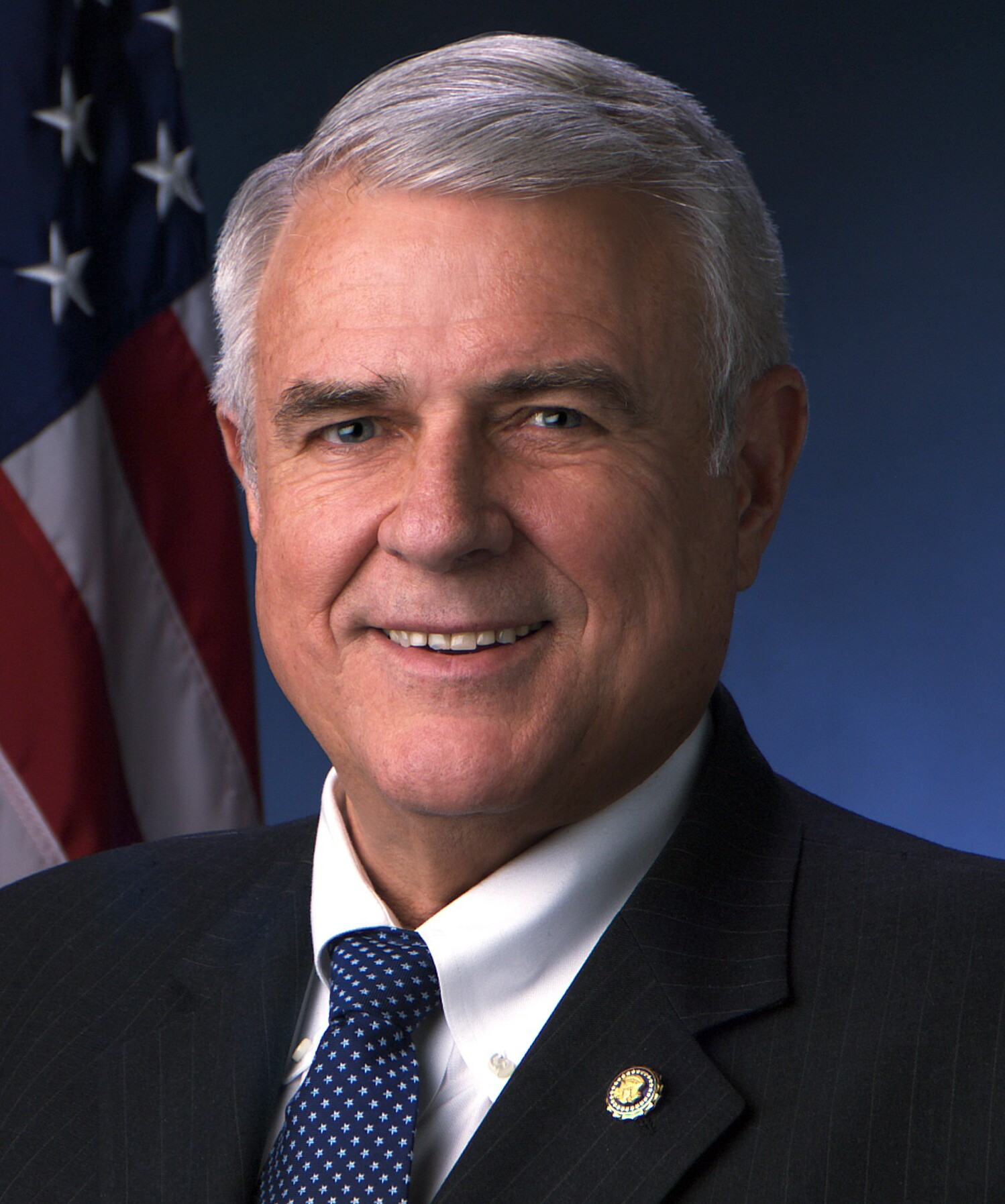

Nominee	John Carter	David Bagley
Party	Republican	Democratic
Popular vote	111,556	44,183
Percentage	69.1%	27.4%
- County results Carter: 50–60% 60–70% 70–80%
U.S. Representative before election
(None)
New district
Elected U.S. Representative
John Carter
Republican

District 31 was created as a result of redistricting after the 2000 census.

=== Predictions ===
Source	Ranking	As of
Sabato's Crystal Ball	Safe R (flip)	November 4, 2002
New York Times	Safe R (flip)	October 14, 2002

=== Results ===
Texas's 31st congressional district, 2002
Party	Candidate	Votes	%
Republican	John Carter	111,556	69.08
Democratic	David Bagley	44,183	27.36
Libertarian	Clark Simmons	2,037	1.26
Green	John Petersen	1,992	1.23
Independent	R.C. Crawford	1,716	1.06
Total votes		161,484	100
Republican win (new seat)			

== District 32 ==
2002 Texas's 32nd congressional district election

Nominee	Pete Sessions	Pauline Dixon
Party	Republican	Democratic
Popular vote	100,226	44,886
Percentage	67.8%	30.4%
- County results Sessions: 60–70%
U.S. Representative before election
Pete Sessions
Republican
Elected U.S. Representative
Pete Sessions
Republican

District 32 was created as a result of redistricting after the 2000 census. Republican Pete Sessions was redistricted here from the 5th District.

=== Predictions ===
Source	Ranking	As of
Sabato's Crystal Ball	Safe R (flip)	November 4, 2002
New York Times	Safe R (flip)	October 14, 2002

=== Results ===
Texas's 32nd congressional district, 2002
Party	Candidate	Votes	%
Republican	Pete Sessions (incumbent)	100,226	67.77
Democratic	Pauline Dixon	44,886	30.35
Libertarian	Steve Martin	1,582	1.07
Green	Carla Hubbell	1,208	0.82
Total votes		147,902	100
Republican hold			

== See also ==
- 2002 United States House of Representatives elections
