= 2016 Virginia ballot measures =

The 2016 Virginia State Elections took place on Election Day, November 8, 2016, the same day as the U.S. Presidential and U.S. House elections in the state. The only statewide elections on the ballot were two constitutional referendums to amend the Virginia State Constitution. Because Virginia state elections are held on off-years, no statewide officers or state legislative elections were held. The referendum was referred to the voters by the Virginia General Assembly.

== Question 1 ==
This amendment would have added section 11-A to Article I and would prevent employers from requiring membership in a labor union as a condition of employment. However, the measure was defeated. Virginia voters had not rejected a statewide question since 1998. Virginia had passed a "right-to-work" statute in 1947.

Question 1
Choice	Votes	%
For	1,743,255	46.38
Against	2,015,475	53.62
Total	3,758,730	100.00
Source: - Official Results

Yes—50–60%
Yes—60–70%
No—50–60%
No—60–70%

== Question 2 ==
This amendment adds section 6-B to Article X and would grant a property tax exemption to a surviving spouse of an emergency service (police, firefighter, emergency medical services, or search and rescue) employee that was killed in action if the spouse uses the property as their primary residence and they have not remarried. The measure passed.

Results by county and independent city: Yes: 60–70%; 70–80%; 80–90%

Question 2
Choice	Votes	%
For	3,031,341	79.74
Against	770,134	20.26
Total	3,801,475	100.00
Source: - Official Results
