= 1998 Virginia ballot measures =

The 1998 Virginia State Elections took place on Election Day, November 3, 1998, the same day as the U.S. House elections in the state. The only statewide elections on the ballot were five constitutional referendums to amend the Virginia State Constitution. Because Virginia state elections are held on off-years, no statewide officers or state legislative elections were held. All referendums were referred to the voters by the Virginia General Assembly.

== Question 1 ==
The Overseas Voters Act amendment asked voters to permit persons employed overseas and their families who are qualified to vote in Virginia to continue to vote in Virginia while overseas, subject to the conditions and time limits set by federal and state laws.

Question 1
Choice	Votes	%
For	828,353	73.18
Against	303,654	26.82
Total	1,132,007	100.00
Source: - Official Results

== Question 2 ==
The Judicial Inquiry and Review Commission Act amendment affects the Judicial Inquiry and Review Commission's confidential investigations of charges against judges. This proposed amendment gives the General Assembly the ability to disclose the scope and level of confidentiality of these investigations. Furthermore, this amendment gives the General Assembly the responsibility to provide by statute the extent to which Commission proceedings and documents will be confidential.

Question 2
Choice	Votes	%
For	690,017	63.20
Against	401,808	36.80
Total	1,091,825	100.00
Source: - Official Results

== Question 3 ==
The Economic Development Areas; Governing Bodies Act amendment asked voters to authorize agreements among localities for sharing the revenues and costs of a specified land area and for the General Assembly to establish a special governing body for the area. Fiscal commitments related to the land area would not be deemed local debt.

Question 3
Choice	Votes	%
For	477,257	43.57
Against	618,214	56.43
Total	1,095,471	100.00
Source: - Official Results

== Question 4 ==
The Economic Growth-Sharing Agreements Act amendment asked voters to exempt the fiscal obligations involved in economic growth-sharing agreements from certain constitutional limits or requirements that usually apply to local debt. The amendment will treat this type of obligation like other special types of local debt that are not subject to those constitutional limits.

Question 4
Choice	Votes	%
For	410,674	37.93
Against	672,151	62.07
Total	1,082,825	100.00
Source: - Official Results

== Question 5 ==
The Tax Exemptions Act amendment asked voters to allow the General Assembly the ability to give local governments the option of partially or fully eliminating either the business, professional or occupational license tax or the merchants' capital tax or both.

Question 5
Choice	Votes	%
For	648,252	61.84
Against	399,950	38.16
Total	1,048,202	100.00
Source: - Official Results
