= 1997 Texas's 28th congressional district special election =

- April 12, 1997
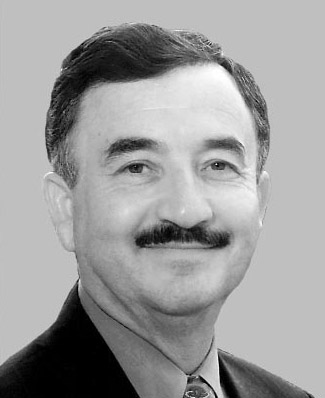

Nominee	Ciro Rodriguez	Juan F. Solis III
Party	Democratic	Democratic
Popular vote	19,992	9,990
Percentage	66.7%	33.3%
Runoff county results
Rodriguez
50–60%
60–70%
80–90%
90>%
Solis
50–60%
U.S. Representative before election
Frank Tejeda
Democratic
Elected U.S. Representative
Ciro Rodriguez
Democratic

After incumbent congressman Frank Tejeda died of brain cancer soon after the congressional elections, a special election was held to fill Texas's 28th congressional district. Since no candidate received an outright majority during the first round on March 15, a special runoff was held on April 12, 1997, which was won by State Representative Ciro Rodriguez.

== Primary results ==
Texas's 28th congressional district special primary (1997)
Party	Candidate	Votes	%
Democratic	Ciro Rodriguez	14,018	46.12%
Democratic	Juan F. Solis III	8,056	26.51%
Republican	Mark Cude	2,452	8.07%
Democratic	Carlos Uresti	1,345	4.43%
Republican	John P. Kelly	1,229	4.04%
Democratic	Lauro Bustamante	819	2.70%
Democratic	John A. Traeger	718	2.36%
Republican	Narciso Mendoza	621	2.04%
Democratic	Phil Ross	376	1.24%
Democratic	Mike Pacheco	231	0.76%
Republican	Oliver Lowell Blair	168	0.55%
Democratic	Patrick A. Mason	158	0.52%
Independent	Robert Cantu	82	0.27%
Democratic	Michael Idrogo	64	0.21%
Total votes		30,394	100%

== Results ==
Texas's 28th congressional district special general election (1997)
Party	Candidate	Votes	%
Democratic	Ciro Rodriguez	19,992	66.68%
Democratic	Juan F. Solis III	9,990	33.32%
Total votes		29,982	100%
Democratic hold			
