= 1998 United States House of Representatives elections in Virginia =

- November 3, 1998

All 11 Virginia seats to the United States House of Representatives
| | Majority party | Minority party | Third party |
|---|---|---|---|
| Party | Democratic | Republican | Independent |
| Last election | 6 | 5 | 0 |
| Seats won | 6 | 5 | 0 |
| Seat change | Steady | Steady | Steady |
| Popular vote | 514,435 | 542,216 | 92,210 |
| Percentage | 44.78% | 47.20% | 8.03% |
| Swing | ▼1.92% | ▼3.60% | ▲6.49% |
Democratic
60–70%
70–80%
>90%
Republican
60–70%
70–80%
80–90%

The 1998 United States House of Representatives elections in Virginia were held on November 3, 1998, to determine who will represent the Commonwealth of Virginia in the United States House of Representatives. Virginia has eleven seats in the House, apportioned according to the 1990 United States census. Representatives are elected for two-year terms.

Virginia was one of six states in which the party that won the state's popular vote did not win a majority of seats in 1998, the other states being Florida, Louisiana, Pennsylvania, Texas, and Wisconsin.

== Overview ==
United States House of Representatives elections in Virginia, 1998
| Party | Votes | Percentage | Seats | +/– |
|---|---|---|---|---|
| Republican | 542,216 | 47.20% | 5 | - |
| Democratic | 514,435 | 44.78% | 6 | - |
| Independents/Write-ins | 92,210 | 8.03% | 0 | - |
| Totals | 1,148,861 | 100.00% | 11 | — |

== See also ==
- United States House elections, 1998
