= Ciro Rodriguez =

American politician (born 1946)

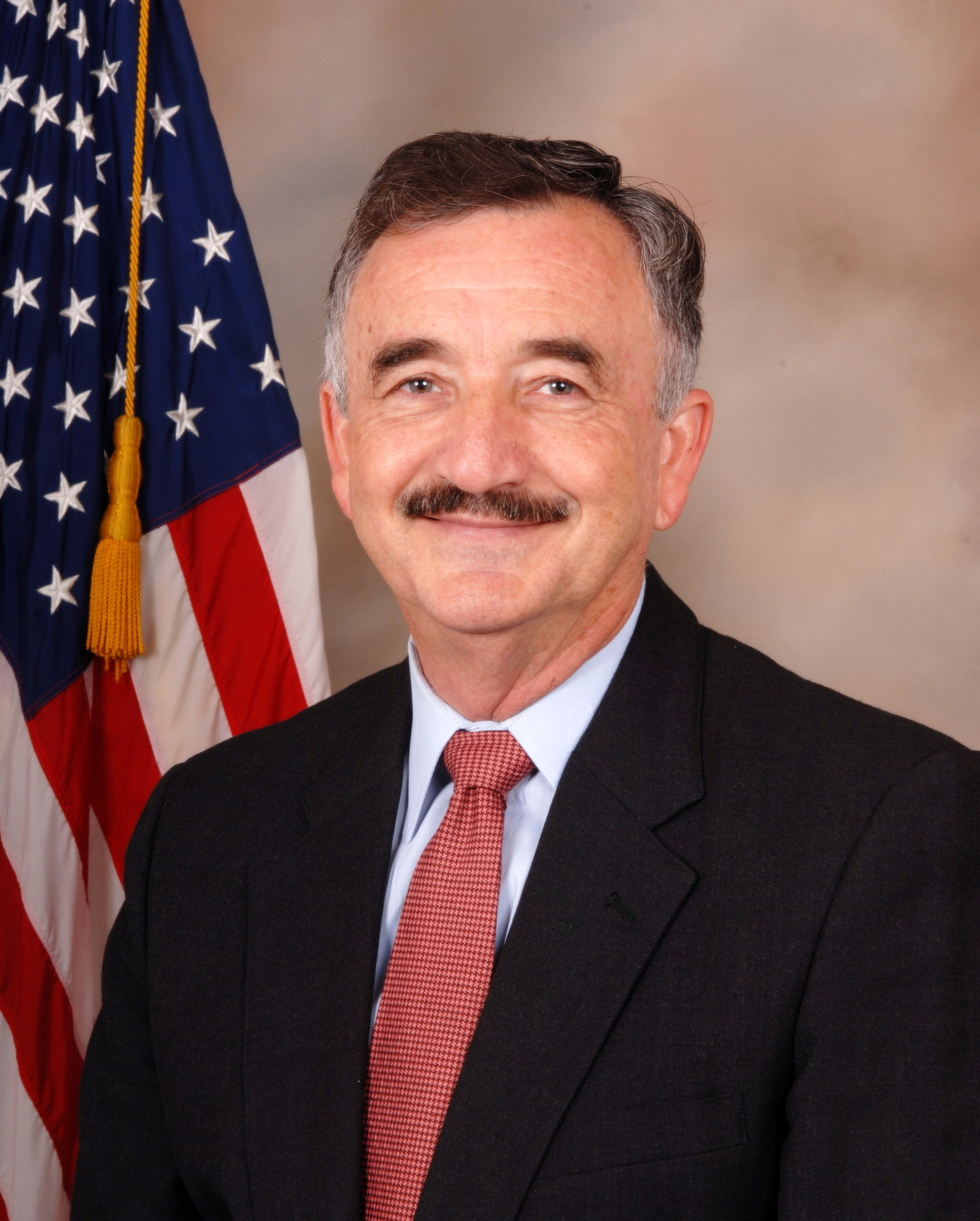
- Official portrait, 2007

Member of the U.S. House of Representatives from Texas
- In office January 3, 2007 – January 3, 2011
- Preceded by: Henry Bonilla
- Succeeded by: Quico Canseco
- Constituency: 23rd district
- In office April 12, 1997 – January 3, 2005 (Note: Rodriguez's official service begins on the date of the special election, while he was not sworn in until April 17, 1997.)
- Preceded by: Frank Tejeda
- Succeeded by: Henry Cuellar
- Constituency: 28th district

Member of the Texas House of Representatives from the 118th district
- In office January 13, 1987 – April 17, 1997
- Preceded by: Frank Tejeda
- Succeeded by: Carlos Uresti

Personal details
- Born: Ciro Davis Rodriguez; December 9, 1946 (age 79) Piedras Negras, Coahuila, Mexico
- Party: Democratic
- Spouse: Carolina Peña
- Education: San Antonio College (attended); St. Mary's University, Texas (BA); Our Lady of the Lake University (MSW)
- Rodriguez's voice Rodriguez supporting the Veterans Health Care, Capital Asset, and Business Improvement Act of 2003. Recorded November 21, 2003

Ciro Davis Rodriguez (born December 9, 1946) is an American politician and social worker who served as a U.S. representative for Texas's 23rd congressional district, serving from 2007 until 2011. The district stretched from El Paso in the west to San Antonio in the east, a distance of some 500 miles (800 km). A member of the Democratic Party, he previously represented the neighboring 28th congressional district from 1997 to 2005, and was a member of the Texas House of Representatives from 1987 to 1997.

He served as a justice of the peace for Bexar County from 2015 to 2021.

== Early life, education and career ==
Rodriguez was born in Piedras Negras, Coahuila, Mexico, but was raised and received his education in San Antonio, Texas. When he was young, his mother died suddenly and he dropped out of school. After working at a gas station for a year, he decided to go back to school and attended two different summer schools to catch up. He graduated with his entering class from Harlandale High School and then briefly attended San Antonio College, but subsequently graduated from St. Mary’s University with a B.A. in Political Science. He received his Master of Social Work from Our Lady of the Lake University.

From 1975 to 1987, he served as a board member of the Harlandale Independent School District, working as an educational consultant for the Intercultural Development Research Association and serving as a caseworker with the Department of Mental Health and Mental Retardation. From 1987 to 1996, he taught at Our Lady of the Lake University's Worden School of Social Service, the oldest school of Social Work in Texas.

After leaving Congress in January 2005, he joined with his former chief of staff, Jeff Mendelsohn, to create Rio Strategy Group LLC, a boutique government relations firm to assist clients at the local, state and national levels. He presently works with Lone Star Consulting, LLC on government relations focusing on Texas cities and counties. Another firm founded by one of his former Capitol Hill staffers, Stephen Hofmann.

== Texas House of Representatives ==
Rodriguez served in the Texas House of Representatives from 1987 to 1997. He chaired the important Local and Consent Calendar Committee, served on the Public Health and the Higher Education Committees, and presided as a vice chairman of the Legislative Study Group. He drafted legislation to allow students to earn college credit while they were in still in high school and the law that guaranteed the top ten percent of graduating students a place at a Texas four-year university.

== U.S. House of Representatives (1997–2005, 2007–2011) ==
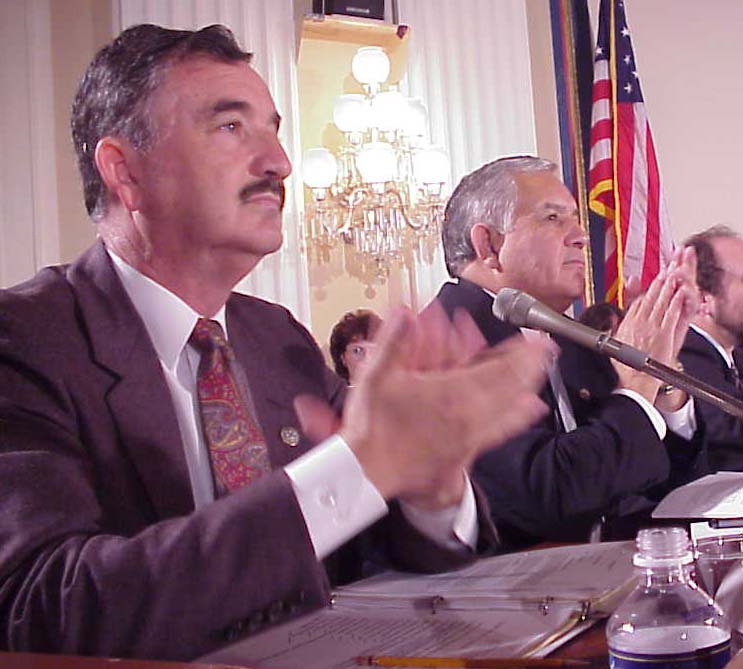
Rodriguez serving as a member of the House Committee on Veterans' Affairs.

In January 1997, 28th District congressman Frank Tejeda died at the start of his third term. A special election to fill the remainder of his service was held in April, resulting in Rodriguez defeating his nearest rival Juan F. Solis III with 66.7% of the vote.

After being sworn in on April 12, Rodriguez served as a member of the Armed Services, Veterans' Affairs and Resources Committees. He was also the ranking member of the VA Subcommittee on Health. Additionally, he led the Congressional Hispanic Caucus as chairman from 2003 to 2004 after four years as its Health Care Task Force Chairman.

He was also involved in military base creation and redevelopment and drafted legislation creating the Brooks City-Base; he also promoted the transformation of the former Kelly Air Force Base into Kelly USA, a maintenance and logistics center.

Rodriguez was the lead sponsor of the Hispanic Health Improvement Act.

In his capacity in Congress from 2006–2011, Congressman Rodriguez led as a champion of Veterans, farmers, law enforcement, and border security for the people of the 23rd District. He made sure the University of Texas at San Antonio had the funds to build a department for the development of Homeland Security, Veterans' received the benefits they deserved, the border was secure from the violence in Mexico, and secured funds for the agriculture community that consists of farmers, Texas A&M University, and Sul Ross State University research programs.

In July 2011, Congressman Rodriguez celebrated with El Paso County officials the groundbreaking of the Tornillo Port of Entry. As a member of the House Appropriations Committee in the 2009–10 legislative session, Congressman Rodriguez was able to secure the $97 million to build the port of entry while also securing funds for new Veterans' Clinics in Del Rio, South San Antonio, and Uvalde.

=== Committee assignments ===
- Committee on Appropriations
  - Subcommittee on Homeland Security
  - Subcommittee on the Legislative Branch
  - Subcommittee on Transportation, Housing and Urban Development, and Related Agencies
- Committee on Veterans' Affairs
  - Subcommittee on Health
  - Subcommittee on Disability Assistance and Memorial Affairs

=== Caucuses ===
- Congressional Hispanic Caucus (CHC), Chair of the Taskforce on Agriculture and Rural Communities

Rodriguez voted against both President Bush's and Obama's TARP/bank bailouts. He also voted against the General Motors bailout. Rodriguez did support the Stimulus plan, Health Care Reform and Financial Regulation of Wall Street. He helped pass the largest increase in veteran’s health care funding and the Wounded Warrior Act, reducing red tape for veterans in need. See: The Voter's Self Defense System He has also focused on national security issues including cyber-security.

== Political campaigns ==
=== 2004 ===
The 2003 Texas redistricting shifted most of heavily Democratic Laredo, previously one of the bases of the 23rd District, into the already heavily Democratic 28th. Laredo is the base of former Texas Secretary of State Henry Cuellar, a somewhat more conservative Democrat than Rodriguez. A year earlier, Cuellar had given the 23rd's five-term Republican incumbent, Henry Bonilla, his closest race ever.

By moving most of Laredo to the 28th, the Republican-controlled legislature hoped to protect Bonilla by packing the 28th with as many Democrats as possible. In March 2004, Rodriguez lost the primary election, the real contest in this district, to Cuellar by 58 votes. Rodriguez sued to overturn Cuellar's victory, but the Texas 4th Court of Appeals ruled against him.

=== 2006 ===
==== 28th district ====
Rodriguez tried to regain his seat in 2006. His campaign was under-financed, but gained significant momentum after a photographer with The Washington Post snapped a photo of Cuellar at the 2006 State of the Union address, on the Republican side of the aisle, smiling as President George W. Bush affectionately grabbed his face. Rodriguez lost the March 7 Democratic primary with 40% of the vote to Cuellar's 53%.

==== 23rd district ====
In June, the Supreme Court of the United States ruled that the Texas Legislature had violated the Voting Rights Act when it drew most of Laredo out of the 23rd and replaced it with several heavily Republican San Antonio suburbs. A three-judge panel then drew new district lines. The new 23rd included Rodriguez's home, along with much of his old south San Antonio base. That area had been part of the 23rd from its creation in 1967 to 1993.

On August 10 Rodriguez announced that he would run against Bonilla in the 23rd. The two opponents, original Democratic nominee Rick Bolanos, four other Democrats and one independent, faced one another in an all-candidate (or "jungle") primary on November 7. Incumbent Bonilla emerged with 48.1% of the vote, and Ciro Rodriguez with 20.3%.

In the runoff election, Rodriguez defeated Bonilla 54% to 46% in an upset victory. This made Rodriguez's district the 30th Democratic pickup in the 2006 House elections, and the second from Texas, after Nick Lampson. He also regained a seat after being defeated in another district in 2004, like Lampson. It was only the second time a Republican congressional incumbent had lost to a Democratic challenger in Texas since 1988 (the first time being Nick Lampson's defeat of a Republican incumbent in 1996). Lampson served with Rodriguez again in 2007–2009, until he was defeated for the second time in 2008.

=== 2008 ===
Rodriguez won against Republican nominee Bexar County Commissioner Lyle Larson and Libertarian Lani Connolly.

=== 2010 ===
Rodriguez was challenged by Republican nominee Quico Canseco, Libertarian nominee Martin Nitschke, Green Party nominee Ed Scharf, and Independent Craig T. Stephens. The election was targeted by the Republican National Committee, which poured money in to support Canseco in an attempt to gain the seat for their party.

Rodriguez was defeated by Canseco, winning 44% to Canseco's 49%.

=== 2012 ===
Ciro Rodriguez announced in early summer 2011 that he would seek election to his former seat in the U.S. Congress in a rematch against Rep. Quico Canseco. But, on November 29, 2011, Rodriguez announced he would campaign for election in the newly drawn, neighboring 35th District, which takes in eastern San Antonio, as well as portions of Atascosa, Comal and Hays counties. After courts changed the redistricting map again, however, Rodriguez returned to running in the 23rd district. He lost to State Rep. Pete Gallego in the Democratic Party primary runoff.

== Later career ==
Rodriguez successfully ran for Justice of the Peace in Bexar County Precinct 1, Place 2 in 2014. He was unopposed in both the primary and the general election. His term of office began January 1, 2015 and he served until October 2021.

== Personal life ==
Rodriguez and his wife, Carolina Peña, have been married for thirty-five years.

== See also ==
- List of Hispanic and Latino Americans in the United States Congress

U.S. House of Representatives
| Preceded by Frank Tejeda | Member of the U.S. House of Representatives from Texas's 28th congressional district 1997–2005 | Succeeded by Henry Cuellar |
| Preceded by Silvestre Reyes | Chair of the Congressional Hispanic Caucus; 2003–2005 | Succeeded by Grace Napolitano |
| Preceded by Henry Bonilla | Member of the U.S. House of Representatives from Texas's 23rd congressional district 2007–2011 | Succeeded by Quico Canseco |
U.S. order of precedence (ceremonial)
| Preceded by Jim Chapman as Former U.S. Representative | Order of precedence of the United States as Former U.S. Representative | Succeeded by Pete Olson as Former U.S. Representative |
