= Frank Tejeda =

American politician

Frank Mariano Tejeda
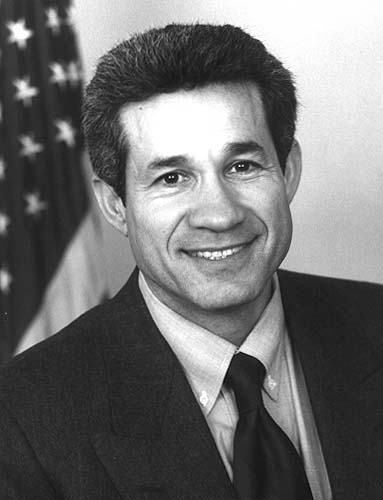

Member of the U.S. House of Representatives from Texas's 28th district
- In office January 3, 1993 – January 30, 1997
- Preceded by: District established
- Succeeded by: Ciro Rodriguez

Member of the Texas State Senate from District 19
- In office January 13, 1987 – January 3, 1993
- Preceded by: Glenn Kothmann
- Succeeded by: Gregory Luna

Member of the Texas House of Representatives
- In office January 11, 1977 – January 13, 1987
- Preceded by: Tony Dramberger
- Succeeded by: Ciro Rodriguez
- Constituency: 118th district (1983-87); District 57-B (1977-83)

Personal details
- Born: October 2, 1945 San Antonio, Texas, U.S.
- Died: January 30, 1997 (aged 51) San Antonio, Texas, U.S.
- Resting place: Fort Sam Houston National Cemetery, San Antonio
- Party: Democratic
- Spouse: Cecilia Tejeda (divorced)
- Children: 3 (2 daughters, 1 son)
- Education: St. Mary's University (BA); UC Berkeley School of Law (JD); Harvard University (MA); Yale Law School (LLM)
- Profession: Lawyer

Military service
- Branch/service: United States Marine Corps
- Years of service: 1963-1967 (active) 1967-1997 (reserve)
- Rank: Major
- Battles/wars: Vietnam War
- Awards: Silver Star; Bronze Star Medal; Purple Heart

Frank Mariano Tejeda (October 2, 1945 – January 30, 1997) was an American Democratic politician from Texas. A native of San Antonio, he served in the United States Marine Corps during the Vietnam War, and upon returning to Texas, went into politics. He served in the Texas House of Representatives from 1976 to 1987, in the Texas Senate from 1987 to 1993, and finally in the United States House of Representatives, representing Texas's 28th congressional district from 1993 until his death.

== Biography ==
Frank M. Tejeda was born in San Antonio, Texas, on October 2, 1945. He attended St. Leo's Catholic School and Harlandale High School.

He grew up in an impoverished household, and had a difficult youth, in which he joined a gang as a teenager. After dropping out of high school, he joined the United States Marine Corps, a decision that he said turned his life around. He was wounded in action during the Vietnam War (1963–1967). He was decorated for valor with the Silver Star, the Bronze Star, and the Purple Heart. During this time, he resumed his education and passed the General Educational Development test. Tejeda reached the rank of major in the Marine Corps Reserve.

After his Marine Corps service, he earned his bachelor's degree in 1970 from St. Mary's University in San Antonio, and his J.D. in 1974 from University of California, Berkeley Law School.

Inspired by the legacy of the Great Society, Tejeda began his political career in the Texas Legislature. He served in the Texas House from 1976 to 1987, and then in the Texas Senate from 1987 to 1993. While serving in the legislature, he earned two master's degrees — in 1980, he received an M.A. from Harvard University, and in 1989, an LL.M. from Yale Law School.

Tejeda was elected with 87% of the votes to the U.S. Congress in 1992, representing the 28th Congressional District of Texas. Notably, serving on the Armed Services Committee and the Veterans' Affairs Committee, his work in the Congress focused on veterans' issues. He was known as a conservative Democrat.

On January 30, 1997, shortly after the beginning of his third term, Congressman Tejeda died in San Antonio from pneumonia at the age of 51, after a year-long battle with brain cancer. He was buried with full military honors at Fort Sam Houston National Cemetery in San Antonio.

== Namesakes ==
- On September 1, 1997, U.S. Highway 281 from Interstate 410 to the Atascosa/Bexar county line was named "Congressman Frank M. Tejeda Memorial Highway" by the Texas Legislature
- A charter high school with his name, Frank Tejeda Academy, in the Harlandale Independent School District in San Antonio, the same district in which he lived and from which he graduated.
- The Frank M. Tejeda Post Office Building in San Antonio, dedicated in 1997.
- The VA outpatient clinic in San Antonio was posthumously named in his honor.
- Frank Tejeda Estates, a housing development at Lackland Air Force Base.
- Frank Tejeda Middle School in the North East Independent School District in San Antonio was posthumously named in his honor.
- Division Park in the City of San Antonio was renamed Frank Tejeda Park in 1996.
- The Texas State Veterans Home in Floresville, Texas is named in memory of Rep. Tejeda.
- After his death, the Marine Corps Reserve Association created the Major Frank M. Tejeda Leadership Award to recognize leaders committed to the Marine Corps.

== See also ==
- List of notable brain tumor patients
- List of Hispanic and Latino Americans in the United States Congress
- List of members of the United States Congress who died in office (1950–1999)

== Notes ==
Texas House of Representatives
Preceded by A. L. "Tony" Dramberger	Member of the Texas House of Representatives from District 57-B (San Antonio); 1977–1983	Succeeded by Inactive district
Preceded by Inactive district	Member of the Texas House of Representatives from District 118 (San Antonio); 1983–1987	Succeeded by Ciro D. Rodriguez
Texas Senate
Preceded by Glenn Kothmann	Texas State Senator from District 19 (San Antonio); 1987–1993	Succeeded by Gregory Luna
U.S. House of Representatives
Preceded by District created following 1990 census	Member of the U.S. House of Representatives from Texas's 28th congressional district 1993–1997	Succeeded by Ciro D. Rodriguez
