= Henry Bonilla =

American journalist (born 1954)

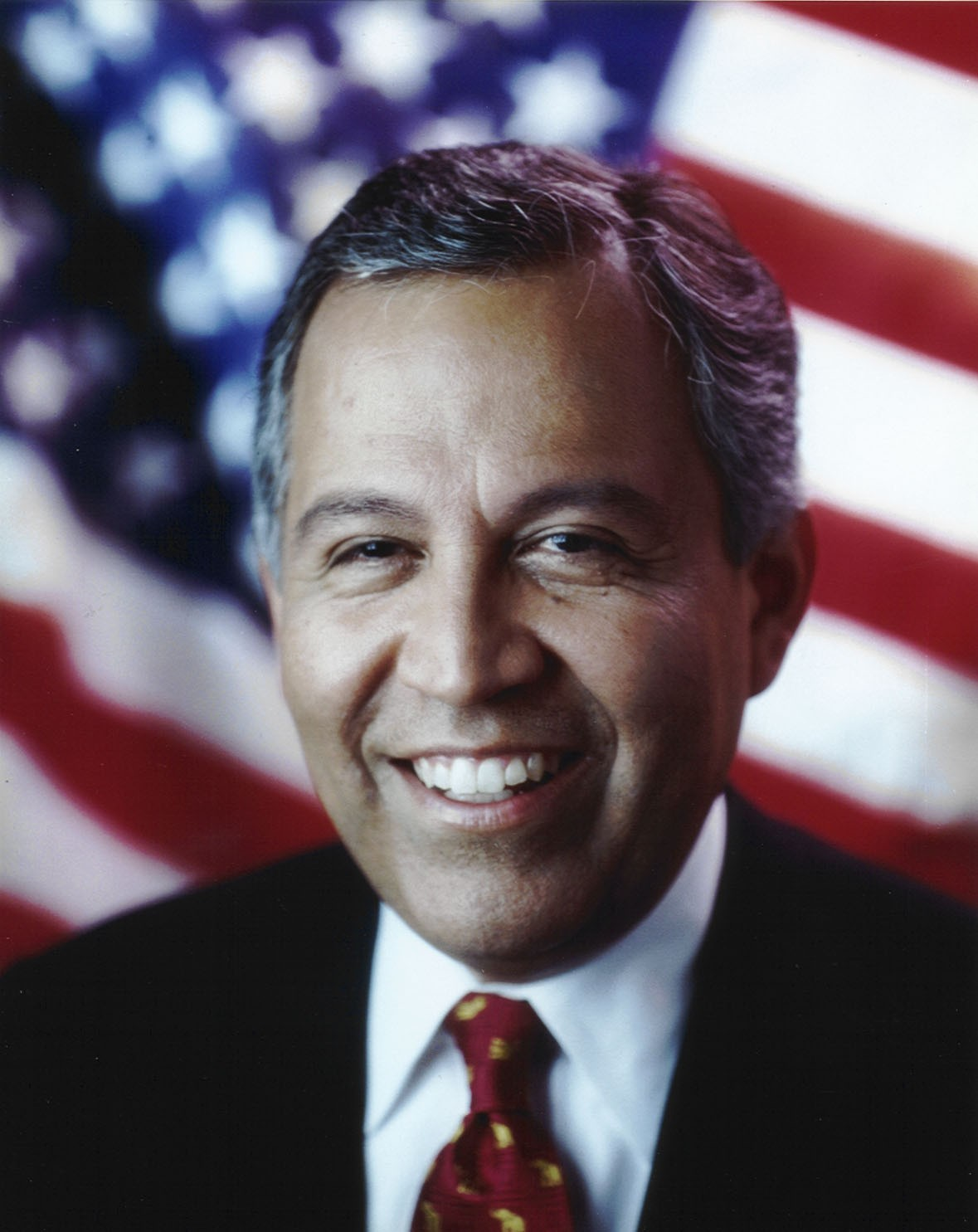

Member of the U.S. House of Representatives from Texas's 23rd district
- In office January 3, 1993 – January 3, 2007
- Preceded by: Albert Bustamante
- Succeeded by: Ciro Rodriguez

Personal details
- Born: January 2, 1954 (age 72) San Antonio, Texas, U.S.
- Party: Republican
- Spouse(s): Deborah Knapp (divorced) Sheryl White Shelby
- Children: 2
- Education: University of Texas, Austin (BA)
- Bonilla's voice Bonilla on FY2006 agriculture, rural development, and related appropriations. Recorded June 28, 2005

Henry Bonilla (born January 2, 1954) is an American politician and former congressman who represented Texas's 23rd congressional district in the United States House of Representatives. He was defeated in his bid for re-election by Ciro Rodriguez, a former Democratic member of Congress, in a special election runoff held on December 12, 2006. His term expired January 3, 2007 when the 110th Congress officially began.

== Roots in San Antonio ==
Bonilla was born in San Antonio, the son of Anita Arellano and Enrique A. Bonilla. When he was young he joined a TRIO Educational Talent Search program, which provides academic support and college awareness activities to students. He graduated from South San Antonio High School in 1972 and received his Bachelor of Journalism degree from the University of Texas at Austin in 1976. Before entering politics, he was a television news executive at San Antonio's CBS affiliate, KENS-TV. His former wife, Deborah Knapp (born December 1, 1954), continues as an anchor at the station. He has since married the former Sheryl White Shelby (born 1959).

== Congressional career ==
In March 1992, Bonilla won the 23rd district's Republican nomination for a seat in the U.S. House of Representatives (map). The 23rd had been a Democratic district since its creation in 1967, but Bonilla charged four-term incumbent Albert G. Bustamante with neglecting his constituents' needs, being involved in the House banking scandal by writing 30 "cheques calientes" in the House Bank, and taking excessive and questionable junkets abroad.

Bonilla was inadvertently assisted by the state legislature, which left a heavily Republican area of western San Antonio in the 23rd while carving the new 28th District out of much of the 23rd's territory. Despite being outspent by $758,453 to $594,032 and being in a district that Bill Clinton carried the same year, Bonilla won by a huge 21-point margin, 59 to 38 percent, the largest margin of defeat for an incumbent that year.

In March 1999, Governor George W. Bush named Bonilla as the only Texan on his presidential exploratory committee. Bonilla often represented Bush on national news programs and as a surrogate speaker. Although the 23rd had a slight Democratic lean, Bonilla developed a very conservative voting record. Largely because of his popularity in San Antonio, he did not face a credible challenge until 2002, when Democrat Henry Cuellar, a former Texas secretary of state, came within two points of unseating him.

Bonilla announced that he would probably run in 2006 for the United States Senate seat held by fellow Republican Kay Bailey Hutchison if she ran for governor in 2006 against the incumbent Republican Rick Perry. However, Hutchison decided to run for another term in the Senate.

== American Dream PAC ==
When Bonilla took charge in 1999 of an independent political fund called American Dream PAC, he made clear that its mission was to "give significant, direct financial assistance to first-rate minority GOP candidates". However, between 1999 and the end of 2003, only $48,750 (or 8.9 percent) of the $547,000 the PAC has received, has gone to minority office-seekers, while more than $100,000 has been routed to Republican Party organizations or causes.

Bonilla defends his PAC's record of assisting minority candidates, saying, "We did the best we could." In all, 27 minority office-seekers, predominantly Hispanic-American, received money, mostly small donations. But Bonilla said it was sometimes difficult to find "good, solid minority candidates to expend the funds on". In July 2003, the treasurer of the PAC pleaded guilty to embezzling $119,021 between 1999 and 2003 and was sentenced to 15 months in prison. The thefts were not discovered until almost four years after they began. "It was a black mark on my judgment", Bonilla said in a 2004 interview.

== 2003 redistricting ==
Bonilla was priming for a rematch against Cuellar in 2004, but in 2003, a controversial mid-decade redistricting by the Texas legislature, the results of efforts by U.S. House Majority Leader Tom DeLay, moved most of Laredo, which had been one of the cores of the 23rd since its formation, to the 28th district. In its place, Bonilla received several heavily Republican San Antonio suburbs that had previously been in the nearby 21st district, all but assuring him of a seventh term. Meanwhile, Cuellar entered and won the 2004 primary against the 28th district incumbent Democrat Ciro Rodriguez and then went on to win the general election.

Bonilla contributed money from his American Dream PAC to the redistricting effort.

Soon after the 2004 elections, Bonilla was criticized when he proposed a procedural rule change that would permit House leaders to retain their leadership positions despite having been indicted by a state grand jury.

The proposal would have allowed Tom DeLay to remain as Majority Leader despite having been indicted by the Travis County district attorney's office for possible campaign finance violations. Many constituents believed that Bonilla was blatantly repaying a political favor to DeLay for having favorably redrawn the 23rd District.

On June 29, 2006, the U.S. Supreme Court, with Justice Anthony Kennedy taking the lead, ruled in League of United Latin American Citizens v. Perry that Bonilla's district violated the Civil Rights Act, although the justices upheld most of the 2003 redistricting. The Court declared that the Texas legislature violated the rights of Latino voters when it cut most of Laredo out of the 23rd. Although the reconfigured 23rd was still 55 percent Latino, only 46 percent of the district's voting-age population was Latino.

The justices held that as a result, the new district didn't have enough Latinos to pass muster under the Voting Rights Act. Since the legislature hadn't created an acceptable majority-Latino district (its intended replacement, the Austin-to-McAllen 25th district, was not considered compact enough), the reconfigured 23rd had to be struck down as well. Because of the size of the 23rd, the ruling effectively forced the redrawing of nearly every district from El Paso to San Antonio. Precedent dictated that a new map had to be issued before the November elections.

The court issued the new lines on August 7. It moved all of Laredo out of the 23rd and into the 28th, but nevertheless made the district much friendlier to Democrats by boosting its Latino population to 65 percent. In particular, Bonilla lost many of the strongly Republican areas he had inherited in the 2003 redistricting. At the same time, he picked up much of heavily Democratic south San Antonio.

Bonilla had grown up in this area, which had been part of the 23rd from 1967 to 1993. The court ordered an all-party primary on Election Day, with a December runoff if no candidate wins 50 percent of the vote. The new map included Rodriguez' home and much of his former base, and he announced that he would run against Bonilla in November. Federal Election Commission records show Bonilla paid the Los Angeles-based law firm of Latham & Watkins $100,000 in 2006, from his campaign funds, to argue that the district boundaries were constitutional. In February, the firm filed an amicus brief before the Supreme Court in support of the redistricting plan.

== Defeat in 2006 ==
On November 7, Bonilla faced six Democrats, including Ciro Rodriguez and Vietnam War veteran Rick Bolanos in the all-candidate special election required by the court decision on redistricting (see above). The ballot also included one independent. Bolanos had won the Democratic primary earlier in the year.

In the first special election, Bonilla won 48 percent of the vote to Rodriguez's 20 percent. Since no one gained a majority, there was a runoff between the two former colleagues. Rodriguez won the runoff with 54% of the vote to Bonilla's 46%. Bonilla was the first Republican incumbent in Texas to be unseated by a Democrat in 10 years, since Nick Lampson's defeat of Steve Stockman in a 1996 runoff election. Lampson was also returned to Congress in 2006 after being defeated for reelection in 2004, like Rodriguez in another district. Bonilla said in interviews the night of his defeat that his loss was in part a result of the changed districting. He ran controversial commercials that claimed that Rodriguez took funds from terrorists, which media outlets called "bold claims". He later apologized to the press for any of those who took offense, but stood by his statement.

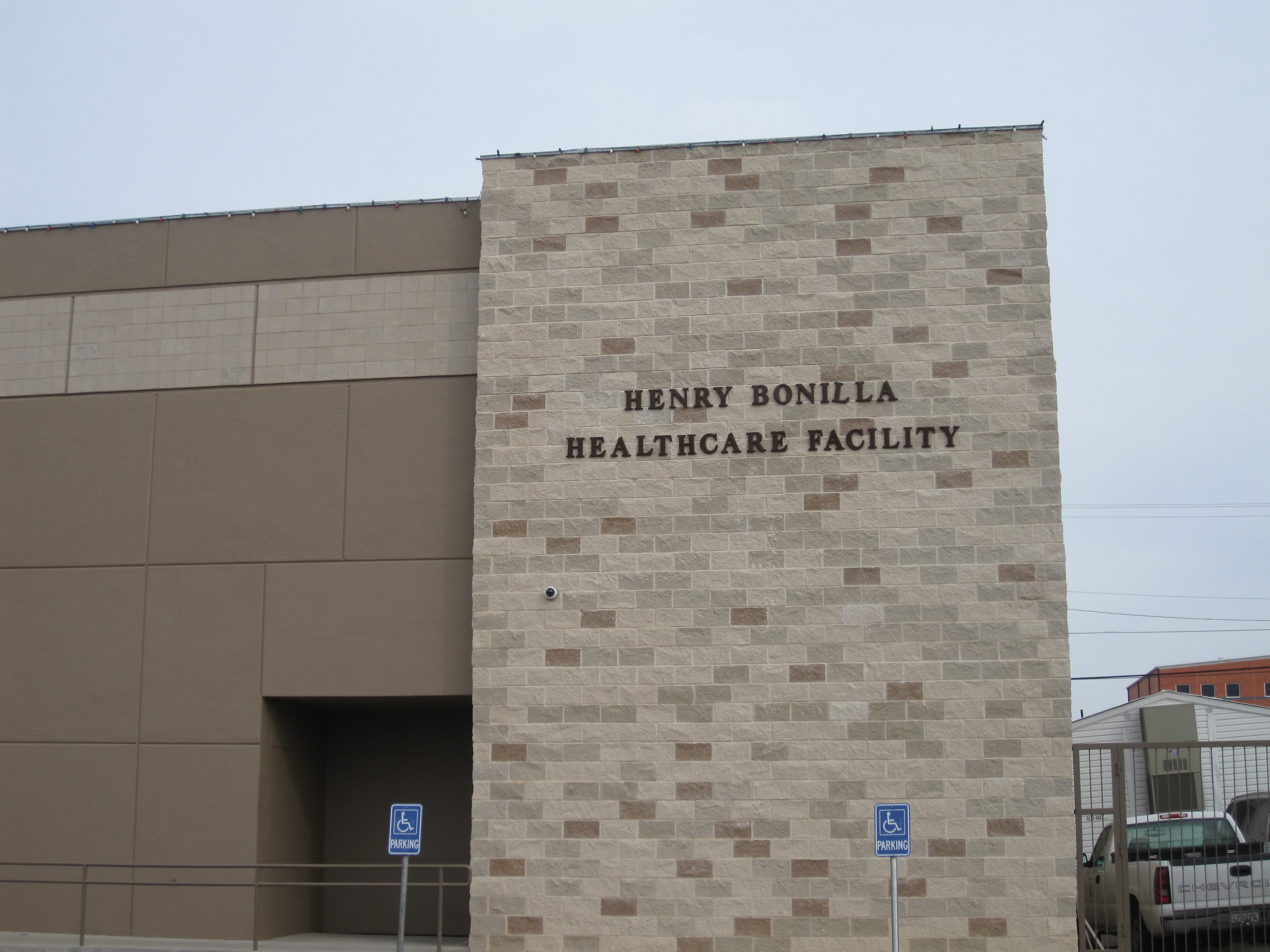
The Henry Bonilla Healthcare Facility off Texas State Highway 359 South in Laredo, Texas

However, a large number of Hispanic and Latino residents in the district expressed disdain for Bonilla by stating that he had fallen out of touch with the needs and concerns of minorities. His reputation even earned him the nickname "Henry Vanilla", as some Hispanics claimed that Bonilla no longer could relate to his culture. In a year of war, illegal immigration issues, and a proposed border fence, Latinos left the Republicans side in droves.

== Failed nomination as ambassador ==
After his term in Congress expired, Bonilla was nominated to be Permanent Representative of the United States of America to the Organization of American States, with the rank of Ambassador.

After two months with no action by the Senate, Bonilla asked U.S. President George W. Bush to withdraw his nomination. Following the withdrawal of his ambassador nomination, Bonilla joined the Washington-based firm The Normandy Group.

== Consideration for Trump Cabinet ==
In December 2016, Bonilla and two other Texas Republicans, Texas Agriculture Commissioner Sid Miller and Miller's predecessor in that office, Susan Combs, were interviewed for the position of United States Secretary of Agriculture in the first Trump administration.

== See also ==
- List of Hispanic and Latino Americans in the United States Congress

U.S. House of Representatives
Preceded by Albert Bustamante	Member of the U.S. House of Representatives from Texas's 23rd congressional district 1993–2007	Succeeded by Ciro Rodriguez
U.S. order of precedence (ceremonial)
Preceded by Ronald D. Coleman as Former U.S. Representative	Order of precedence of the United States as Former U.S. Representative	Succeeded by Charlie Gonzalez as Former U.S. Representative
