= 1996 United States House of Representatives elections in Texas =

- November 5, 1996

All 30 Texas seats to the United States House of Representatives
	Majority party	Minority party
Party	Democratic	Republican
Last election	19	11
Seats before	18	12
Seats won	17	13
Seat change	▼1	▲1
Popular vote	2,206,346	2,604,389
Percentage	44.82%	52.91%
Swing	▲2.7%	▼2.8%
Democratic
50–60%
60–70%
70–80%
Republican
50–60%
60–70%
70–80%
80–90%

The 1996 United States House of Representatives elections in Texas occurred on November 5, 1996, to elect the members of the state of Texas's delegation to the United States House of Representatives. Texas had thirty seats in the House, apportioned according to the 1990 United States census.

Texas underwent mid-decade redistricting as a result of the Supreme Court case Bush v. Vera. The court had ruled that districts such as District 18 and District 30 were racially gerrymandered. A prior district court decision had voided the results of the primary elections in 13 districts, which the Supreme Court upheld. These districts instead conducted special elections concurrent with the general elections.

These elections occurred simultaneously with the United States Senate elections of 1996, the United States House elections in other states, and various state and local elections.

Texas Democrats maintained their majority in Texas' congressional delegation, albeit reduced by two seats from 1994. These elections produced an unusually high level of turnover due to the retirements of several representatives.

== Overview ==
United States House of Representatives elections in Texas, 1996
Party	Votes	Percentage	Seats before	Seats after	+/–
Republican	2,604,389	52.91%	11	13	+2
Democratic	2,206,346	44.82%	19	17	-2
Independent	43,570	0.89%	0	0	-
Libertarian	30,019	0.61%	0	0	-
Natural Law	29,993	0.61%	0	0	-
Constitution	7,887	0.02%	0	0	-
Totals	4,922,204	100.00%	30	30	—

== District 1 ==
Incumbent Democrat Jim Chapman opted to retire rather than run for re-election.

Texas's 1st congressional district, 1996
Party	Candidate	Votes	%
Democratic	Max Sandlin	102,697	51.56
Republican	Ed Merritt	93,105	46.75
Natural Law	Margaret Palms	3,368	1.69
Total votes		199,170	100
Democratic hold			

== District 2 ==
Incumbent Democrat Charlie Wilson opted to retire rather than run for re-election.

Texas's 2nd congressional district, 1996
Party	Candidate	Votes	%
Democratic	Jim Turner	102,908	52.25
Republican	Brian Babin	89,838	45.61
Independent	Henry McCullough	2,390	1.21
Libertarian	David Constant	1,240	0.63
Natural Law	Gary Hardy	595	0.30
Total votes		196,971	100
Democratic hold			

== District 3 ==
Incumbent Republican Sam Johnson ran for re-election. The 3rd district was among thirteen districts holding a special election on November 5, the same day as the general election. The race pitted all certified candidates against one another in each district, regardless of party.

Texas's 3rd congressional district, 1996
Party	Candidate	Votes	%
Republican	Sam Johnson (incumbent)	142,325	72.98
Democratic	Lee Cole	47,654	24.43
Libertarian	John Davis	5,045	2.59
Write-in	Others	2	0.00
Total votes		195,026	100
Republican hold			

== District 4 ==
1996 Texas's 4th congressional district election
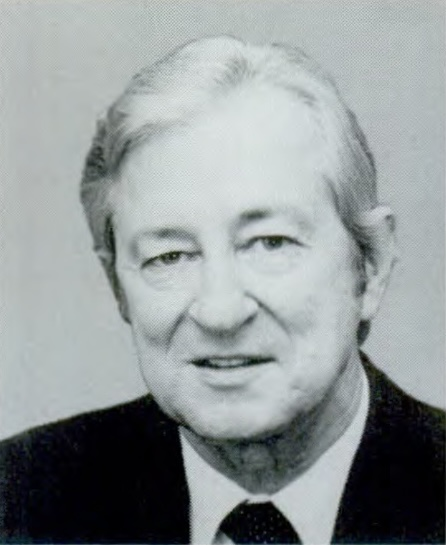

Nominee	Ralph Hall	Jerry Ray Hall
Party	Democratic	Republican
Popular vote	132,126	71,065
Percentage	63.8%	34.3%
- County results R. Hall: 50–60% 60–70% 70–80% J. Hall: 50–60%
U.S. Representative before election
Ralph Hall
Democratic
Elected U.S. Representative
Ralph Hall
Democratic

Incumbent Democrat Ralph Hall ran for re-election.

Texas's 4th congressional district, 1996
Party	Candidate	Votes	%
Democratic	Ralph M. Hall	132,126	63.77
Republican	Jerry Ray Hall	71,065	34.30
Libertarian	Steven Rothacker	3,172	1.53
Natural Law	Enos Denham	814	0.39
Total votes		207,177	100
Democratic hold			

== District 5 ==
Incumbent Democrat John Wiley Bryant retired to run for U.S. Senator. The 5th district was among thirteen districts holding a special election on November 5, the same day as the general election. The race pitted all certified candidates against one another in each district, regardless of party.

Texas's 5th congressional district, 1996
Party	Candidate	Votes	%
Republican	Pete Sessions	80,196	53.07
Democratic	John Pouland	70,922	46.93
Write-in	Jesus Christ	1	0.00
Total votes		151,119	100.00
Republican gain from Democratic			

== District 6 ==
Incumbent Republican Joe Barton ran for re-election. The 6th district was among thirteen districts holding a special election on November 5, the same day as the general election. The race pitted all certified candidates against one another in each district, regardless of party.

Texas's 6th congressional district, 1996
Party	Candidate	Votes	%
Republican	Joe Barton (incumbent)	160,800	77.12
Independent	Skeet Richardson	26,713	12.81
Libertarian	Catherine Anderson	14,456	6.93
Constitution	Doug Williams	6,547	3.14
Total votes		208,516	100
Republican hold			

== District 7 ==
Incumbent Republican Bill Archer ran for re-election. The 7th district was among thirteen districts holding a special election on November 5, the same day as the general election. The race pitted all certified candidates against one another in each district, regardless of party.

Texas's 7th congressional district, 1996
Party	Candidate	Votes	%
Republican	Bill Archer (incumbent)	152,024	81.37
Democratic	Al J.K. Siegmund	28,187	15.09
Independent	Gene Hsiao	3,896	2.09
Independent	Randy Sims	2,724	1.46
Total votes		186,831	100
Republican hold			

== District 8 ==
1996 Texas's 8th congressional district election
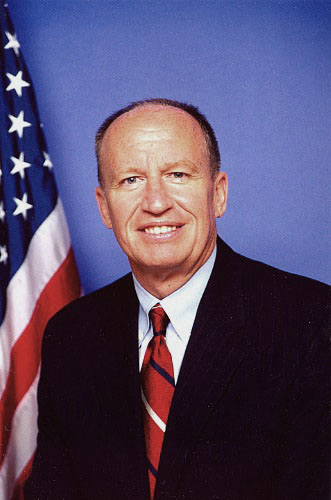
Candidate	Kevin Brady	Gene Fontenot
Party	Republican	Republican
First round	80,325; 41.5%	75,399; 38.9%
Runoff	30,366; 59.1%	21,004; 40.9%
Candidate	CJ Newman	Robert Musemeche
Party	Democratic	Democratic
First round	26,246; 13.6%	11,689; 6.0%
Runoff	Eliminated	Eliminated
- Brady: 40–50% 50–60% 60–70% Fontenot: 40–50%
U.S. Representative before election
Jack Fields
Republican
Elected U.S. Representative
Kevin Brady
Republican

Incumbent Republican Jack Fields opted to retire rather than run for re-election. The 8th district was among thirteen districts holding a special election on November 5, the same day as the general election. The race pitted all certified candidates against one another in each district, regardless of party.

Texas's 8th congressional district, 1996
Party	Candidate	Votes	%
Republican	Kevin Brady	80,325	41.48
Republican	Gene Fontenot	75,399	38.93
Democratic	CJ Newman	26,246	13.55
Democratic	Robert Musemeche	11,689	6.04
Total votes		193,659	100

No candidate received a majority of the vote, so a runoff was held on December 10.

Texas's 8th congressional district runoff, 1996
Party	Candidate	Votes	%
Republican	Kevin Brady	30,366	59.11
Republican	Gene Fontenot	21,004	40.89
Total votes		51,370	100
Republican hold			

== District 9 ==
1996 Texas's 9th congressional district election
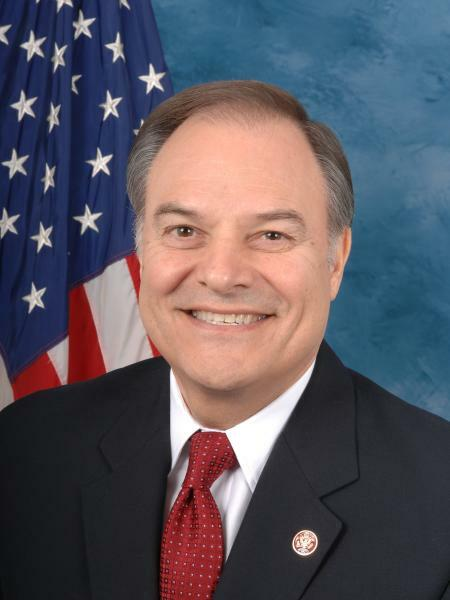

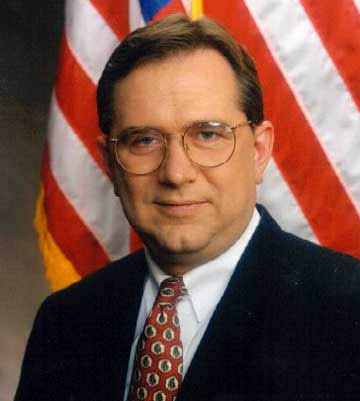
Candidate	Nick Lampson	Steve Stockman
Party	Democratic	Republican
First round	83,782; 44.1%	88,171; 46.4%
Runoff	59,225; 52.8%	52,870; 47.2%
Candidate	Geraldine Sam
Party	Democratic
First round	17,887; 9.4%
Runoff	Eliminated
- Lampson: 50–60% Stockman: 40–50% 60–70%
U.S. Representative before election
Steve Stockman
Republican
Elected U.S. Representative
Nick Lampson
Democratic

Incumbent Republican Steve Stockman ran for re-election. The 9th district was among thirteen districts holding a special election on November 5, the same day as the general election. The race pitted all certified candidates against one another in each district, regardless of party.

Texas's 9th congressional district, 1996
Party	Candidate	Votes	%
Republican	Steve Stockman (incumbent)	88,171	46.44
Democratic	Nick Lampson	83,782	44.13
Democratic	Geraldine Sam	17,887	9.42
Total votes		189,840	100

No candidate received a majority of the vote, so a runoff was held on December 10. Stockman lost reelection by 5.66% to Democratic challenger Nick Lampson.

Texas's 9th congressional district runoff, 1996
Party	Candidate	Votes	%
Democratic	Nick Lampson	59,225	52.83
Republican	Steve Stockman (incumbent)	52,870	47.17
Total votes		112,095	100.00
Democratic gain from Republican			

== District 10 ==
Incumbent Democrat Lloyd Doggett ran for re-election. He won against Republican candidate Teresa Doggett, to whom he has no relation.

Texas's 10th congressional district, 1996
Party	Candidate	Votes	%
Democratic	Lloyd Doggett (incumbent)	132,066	56.20
Republican	Teresa Doggett	97,204	41.36
Libertarian	Gary Johnson	3,950	1.68
Natural Law	Steve Klayman	1,771	0.75
Total votes		234,991	100
Democratic hold			

== District 11 ==
Incumbent Democrat Chet Edwards ran for re-election.

Texas's 11th congressional district, 1996
Party	Candidate	Votes	%
Democratic	Chet Edwards (incumbent)	99,990	56.83
Republican	Jay Mathis	74,549	42.37
Natural Law	Ken Hardin	1,396	0.79
Total votes		175,935	100
Democratic hold			

== District 12 ==
1996 Texas's 12th congressional district election
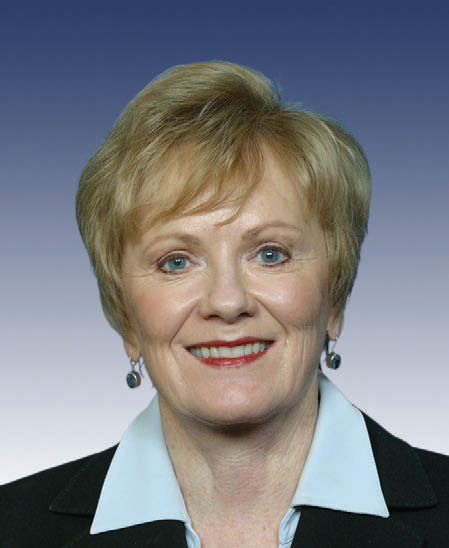

Nominee	Kay Granger	Hugh Parmer
Party	Republican	Democratic
Popular vote	98,349	69,859
Percentage	57.8%	41.0%
- County results Granger: 50–60% 60–70%
U.S. Representative before election
Pete Geren
Democratic
Elected U.S. Representative
Kay Granger
Republican

Incumbent Democrat Pete Geren opted to retire rather than run for re-election.

Texas's 12th congressional district, 1996
Party	Candidate	Votes	%
Republican	Kay Granger	98,349	57.78
Democratic	Hugh Parmer	69,859	41.04
Natural Law	Heather Proffer	1,996	1.17
Total votes		170,204	100.00
Republican gain from Democratic			

== District 13 ==
Incumbent Republican Mac Thornberry ran for re-election.

Texas's 13th congressional district, 1996
Party	Candidate	Votes	%
Republican	Mac Thornberry (incumbent)	116,098	66.87
Democratic	Samuel Brown Silverman	56,066	32.29
Natural Law	Don Harkey	1,463	0.84
Total votes		173,627	100
Republican hold			

== District 14 ==
Incumbent Democrat Greg Laughlin switched his party affiliation to the Republican Party on June 26, 1995. He was defeated in the Republican Primary by former U.S. Representative Ron Paul.

Texas's 14th congressional district, 1996
Party	Candidate	Votes	%
Republican	Ron Paul	99,961	51.08
Democratic	Lefty Morris	93,200	47.62
Natural Law	Ed Fasanella	2,538	1.30
Total votes		195,699	100
Republican hold			

== District 15 ==
Incumbent Democrat Kika de la Garza opted to retire rather than run for re-election.

Texas's 15th congressional district, 1996
Party	Candidate	Votes	%
Democratic	Ruben Hinojosa	86,347	62.30
Republican	Tom Haughey	50,914	36.74
Natural Law	Rob Wofford	1,333	0.96
Total votes		138,594	100
Democratic hold			

== District 16 ==
Incumbent Democrat Ronald D. Coleman opted to retire rather than run for re-election.

Texas's 16th congressional district, 1996
Party	Candidate	Votes	%
Democratic	Silvestre Reyes	90,260	70.63
Republican	Rick Ledesma	35,271	27.60
Natural Law	Carl Proffer	2,253	1.76
Total votes		127,784	100
Democratic hold			

== District 17 ==
1996 Texas's 17th congressional district election
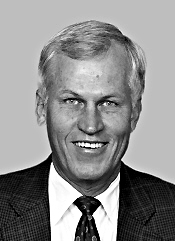

Nominee	Charles Stenholm	Rudy Izzard
Party	Democratic	Republican
Popular vote	99,678	91,429
Percentage	51.7%	47.4%
- County results Stenholm: 40–50% 50–60% 60–70% 70–80% Izzard: 50–60%
U.S. Representative before election
Charles Stenholm
Democratic
Elected U.S. Representative
Charles Stenholm
Democratic

Incumbent Democrat Charles Stenholm ran for re-election.

Texas's 17th congressional district, 1996
Party	Candidate	Votes	%
Democratic	Charles Stenholm	99,678	51.65
Republican	Rudy Izzard	91,429	47.37
Natural Law	Richard Caro	1,887	0.98
Total votes		192,994	100
Democratic hold			

== District 18 ==
Incumbent Democrat Sheila Jackson Lee ran for re-election. The 18th district was among thirteen districts holding a special election on November 5, the same day as the general election. The race pitted all certified candidates against one another in each district, regardless of party.

Texas's 18th congressional district, 1996
Party	Candidate	Votes	%
Democratic	Sheila Jackson Lee (incumbent)	106,111	77.07
Republican	Larry White	13,956	10.14
Republican	Jerry Burley	7,877	5.72
Republican	George Young	5,332	3.87
Democratic	Mike Lamson	4,412	3.20
Total votes		137,688	100
Democratic hold			

== District 19 ==
Incumbent Republican Larry Combest ran for re-election.

Texas's 19th congressional district, 1996
Party	Candidate	Votes	%
Republican	Larry Combest (incumbent)	156,910	80.37
Democratic	John Sawyer	38,316	19.63
Total votes		195,226	100
Republican hold			

== District 20 ==
Incumbent Democrat Henry B. González ran for re-election.

Texas's 20th congressional district, 1996
Party	Candidate	Votes	%
Democratic	Henry B. Gonzalez (incumbent)	88,190	63.72
Republican	James Walker	47,616	34.40
Libertarian	Alex De Pena	2,156	1.56
Natural Law	Lyndon Felps	447	0.32
Total votes		138,409	100
Democratic hold			

== District 21 ==
Incumbent Republican Lamar Smith ran for re-election.

Texas's 21st congressional district, 1996
Party	Candidate	Votes	%
Republican	Lamar Smith (incumbent)	205,830	76.43
Democratic	Gordon Wharton	60,338	22.40
Natural Law	Randy Rutenbeck	3,139	1.17
Total votes		269,307	100
Republican hold			

== District 22 ==
Incumbent Republican Tom DeLay ran for re-election. The 22nd district was among thirteen districts holding a special election on November 5, the same day as the general election. The race pitted all certified candidates against one another in each district, regardless of party.

Texas's 22nd congressional district, 1996
Party	Candidate	Votes	%
Republican	Tom DeLay (incumbent)	126,056	68.11
Democratic	Scott Douglas Cunningham	59,030	31.89
Total votes		185,086	100
Republican hold			

== District 23 ==
Incumbent Republican Henry Bonilla ran for re-election.

Texas's 23rd congressional district, 1996
Party	Candidate	Votes	%
Republican	Henry Bonilla (incumbent)	101,332	61.85
Democratic	Charles Jones	59,596	36.37
Natural Law	Linda Caswell	2,911	1.78
Total votes		163,839	100
Republican hold			

== District 24 ==
Incumbent Democrat Martin Frost ran for re-election. The 24th district was among thirteen districts holding a special election on November 5, the same day as the general election. The race pitted all certified candidates against one another in each district, regardless of party.

Texas's 24th congressional district, 1996
Party	Candidate	Votes	%
Democratic	Martin Frost	77,847	55.75
Write-in	Martin Frost	8	0.01
Total	Martin Frost (incumbent)	77,855	55.76
Republican	Ed Harrison	54,551	39.07
Democratic	Marion Jacob	4,656	3.33
Independent	Dale Mouton	2,574	1.84
Write-in	Fred Hank	1	0.00
Total votes		139,637	100
Democratic hold			

== District 25 ==
Incumbent Democrat Ken Bentsen ran for re-election. The 25th district was among thirteen districts holding a special election on November 5, the same day as the general election. The race pitted all certified candidates against one another in each district, regardless of party.

Texas's 25th congressional district, 1996
Party	Candidate	Votes	%
Democratic	Ken Bentsen (incumbent)	43,701	34.04
Republican	Dolly Madison McKenna	21,898	17.06
Democratic	Beverley Clark	21,699	16.90
Republican	Brent Perry	16,737	13.04
Republican	John Devine	9,070	7.06
Republican	John Sanchez	8,984	7.00
Republican	Ken Mathis	3,649	2.84
Republican	RC Meinke	997	0.78
Republican	Lloyd Oliver	827	0.64
Republican	Dotty Quinn Collins	561	0.44
Socialist Workers	Jerry Freiwirth	270	0.21
Total votes		128,393	100

No candidate received a majority of the vote, so a runoff was held on December 10.

Texas's 25th congressional district runoff, 1996
Party	Candidate	Votes	%
Democratic	Ken Bentsen (incumbent)	29,396	57.32
Republican	Dolly Madison McKenna	21,892	42.68
Total votes		51,288	100
Democratic hold			

== District 26 ==
Incumbent Republican Dick Armey ran for re-election. The 26th district was among thirteen districts holding a special election on November 5, the same day as the general election. The race pitted all certified candidates against one another in each district, regardless of party.

Texas's 26th congressional district, 1996
Party	Candidate	Votes	%
Republican	Dick Armey (incumbent)	163,708	73.63
Democratic	Jerry Frankel	58,623	26.37
Write-in	Others	11	0.00
Total votes		222,342	100
Republican hold			

== District 27 ==
Incumbent Democrat Solomon Ortiz ran for re-election.

Texas's 27th congressional district, 1996
Party	Candidate	Votes	%
Democratic	Solomon Ortiz (incumbent)	97,350	64.64
Republican	Joe Gardner	50,964	33.84
Natural Law	Kevin Richardson	2,286	1.52
Total votes		150,600	100
Democratic hold			

== District 28 ==
Incumbent Democrat Frank Tejeda ran for re-election.

Texas's 28th congressional district, 1996
Party	Candidate	Votes	%
Democratic	Frank Tejeda (incumbent)	110,148	75.37
Republican	Mark Cude	34,191	23.40
Natural Law	Clifford Finley	1,796	1.23
Total votes		150,600	100
Democratic hold			

== District 29 ==
Incumbent Democrat Gene Green ran for re-election. The 29th district was among thirteen districts holding a special election on November 5, the same day as the general election. The race pitted all certified candidates against one another in each district, regardless of party.

Texas's 29th congressional district, 1996
Party	Candidate	Votes	%
Democratic	Gene Green (incumbent)	61,751	67.51
Republican	Jack Rodriguez	28,381	31.03
Constitution	Jack Klinger	1,340	1.46
Total votes		91,472	100
Democratic hold			

== District 30 ==
Incumbent Democrat Eddie Bernice Johnson ran for re-election. The 30th district was among thirteen districts holding a special election on November 5, the same day as the general election. The race pitted all certified candidates against one another in each district, regardless of party.

Texas's 30th congressional district, 1996
Party	Candidate	Votes	%
Democratic	Eddie Bernice Johnson (incumbent)	61,723	54.59
Republican	John Hendry	20,665*	18.28
Democratic	James Sweatt	9,909	8.76
Democratic	Marvin Crenshaw	7,765	6.87
Republican	Lisa Kitterman	7,761	6.86
Independent	Lisa Hembry	3,501	3.10
Independent	Ada Granado	1,278	1.13
Independent	Stevan Hammond	468	0.41
Write-in	Eddie Bernice Johnson (misspelled)	2	0.00
Total votes		113,072	100

*Includes one write-in vote
