= 2000 United States House of Representatives elections in Texas =

Lower house elections for Texas, America in 2000

- November 7, 2000

All 30 Texas seats to the United States House of Representatives
	Majority party	Minority party
Party	Democratic	Republican
Last election	17	13
Seats won	17	13
Seat change	Steady	Steady
Popular vote	2,799,051	2,932,411
Percentage	46.76%	48.99%
Swing	▲2.53%	▼2.62%

Democratic
40–50%
50–60%
60–70%
70–80%
80–90%
90>%
Republican
50–60%
60–70%
70–80%
80–90%
90>%

The 2000 United States House of Representatives elections in Texas occurred on November 7, 2000, to elect the members of the state of Texas's delegation to the United States House of Representatives. Texas had thirty seats in the House, apportioned according to the 1990 United States census.

These elections occurred simultaneously with the United States Senate elections of 2000, the United States House elections in other states, and various state and local elections. Despite the presence of Texas governor George W. Bush as the Republican nominee for president and his landslide victory in the state, the Democratic Party retained its majority of House seats.

Texas was one of five states in which the party that won the state's popular vote did not win a majority of seats in 2000, the other states being Missouri, New Mexico, Pennsylvania, and Wisconsin.

== Overview ==
2000 United States House of Representatives elections in Texas
Party	Votes	Percentage	Seats before	Seats after	+/–
Republican	2,932,411	48.99%	13	13	-
Democratic	2,799,051	46.76%	17	17	-
Libertarian	245,402	4.10%	0	0	-
Independent	8,899	0.15%	0	0	-
Totals	5,985,763	100.00%	30	30	—

== District 1 ==
2000 Texas's 1st congressional district election
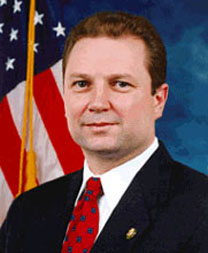

Nominee	Max Sandlin	Noble Willingham
Party	Democratic	Republican
Popular vote	118,157	91,912
Percentage	55.8%	43.4%
- County results Sandlin: 50–60% 60–70% Willingham: 50–60%
U.S. Representative before election
Max Sandlin
Democratic
Elected U.S. Representative
Max Sandlin
Democratic

Incumbent Democrat Max Sandlin ran for re-election. In the general election, he defeated Republican Noble Willingham by over 12 points.

Texas's 1st congressional district, 2000
Party	Candidate	Votes	%
Democratic	Max Sandlin (incumbent)	118,157	55.77
Republican	Noble Willingham	91,912	43.39
Libertarian	Ray Carr	1,779	0.84
Total votes		211,848	100
Democratic hold			

== District 2 ==
2000 Texas's 2nd congressional district election
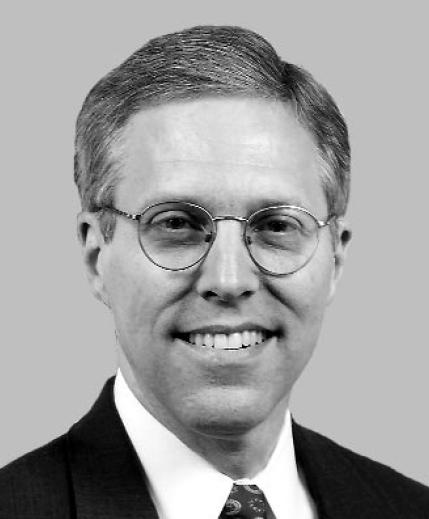

Nominee	Jim Turner	Gary Lyndon Dye
Party	Democratic	Libertarian
Popular vote	162,891	15,939
Percentage	91.1%	8.9%
- County results Turner: 80–90% 90–100%
U.S. Representative before election
Jim Turner
Democratic
Elected U.S. Representative
Jim Turner
Democratic

Incumbent Democrat Jim Turner ran for re-election.

Texas's 2nd congressional district, 2000
Party	Candidate	Votes	%
Democratic	Jim Turner (incumbent)	162,891	91.09
Libertarian	Gary Lyndon Dye	15,939	8.91
Total votes		178,830	100
Democratic hold			

== District 3 ==
2000 Texas's 3rd congressional district election
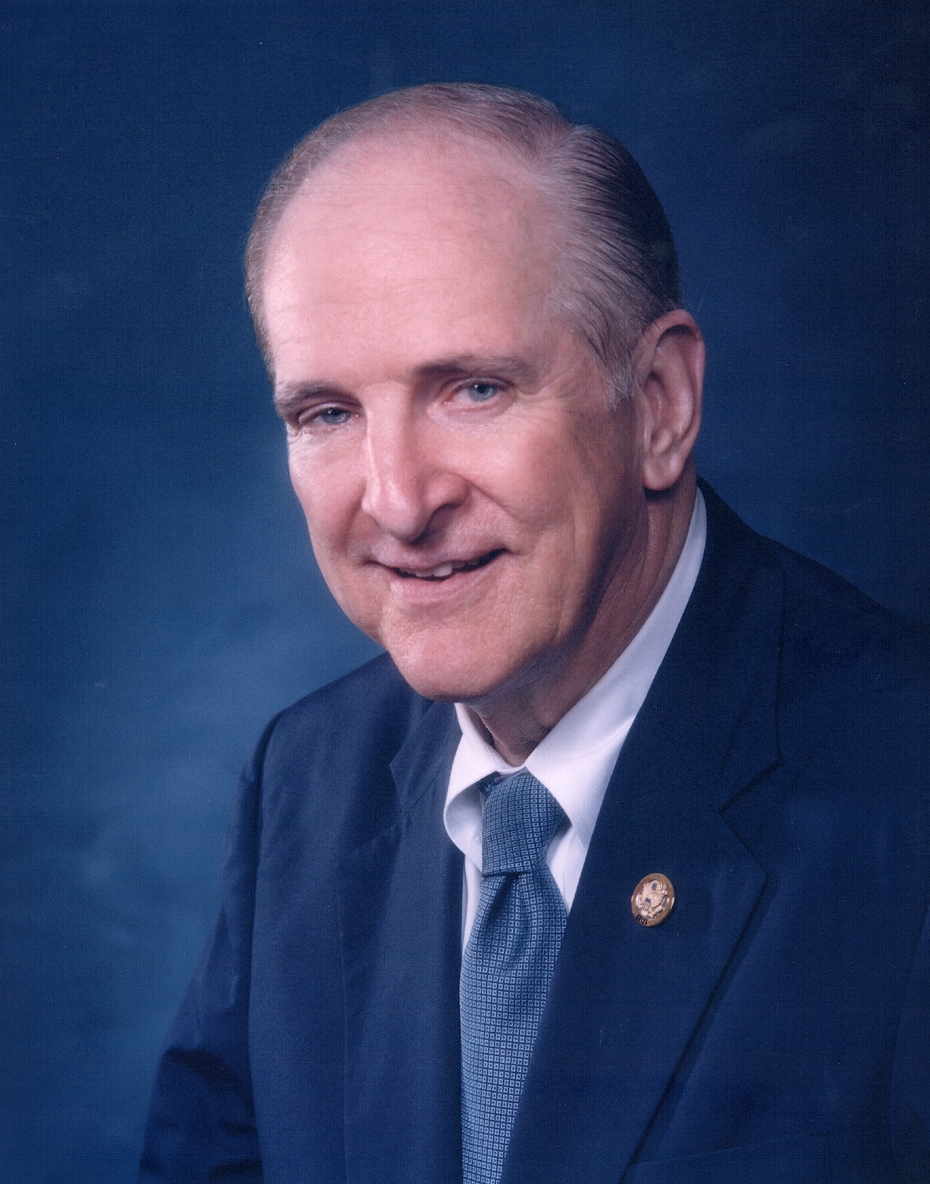

Nominee	Sam Johnson	Billy Wayne Zachary
Party	Republican	Democratic
Popular vote	187,486	67,233
Percentage	71.6%	25.7%
- County results Johnson: 60–70% 70–80%
U.S. Representative before election
Sam Johnson
Republican
Elected U.S. Representative
Sam Johnson
Republican

Incumbent Republican Sam Johnson ran for re-election.

Texas's 3rd congressional district, 2000
Party	Candidate	Votes	%
Republican	Sam Johnson (incumbent)	187,486	71.59
Democratic	Billy Wayne Zachary	67,233	25.67
Libertarian	Lance Flores	7,178	2.74
Total votes		261,897	100
Republican hold			

== District 4 ==
2000 Texas's 4th congressional district election
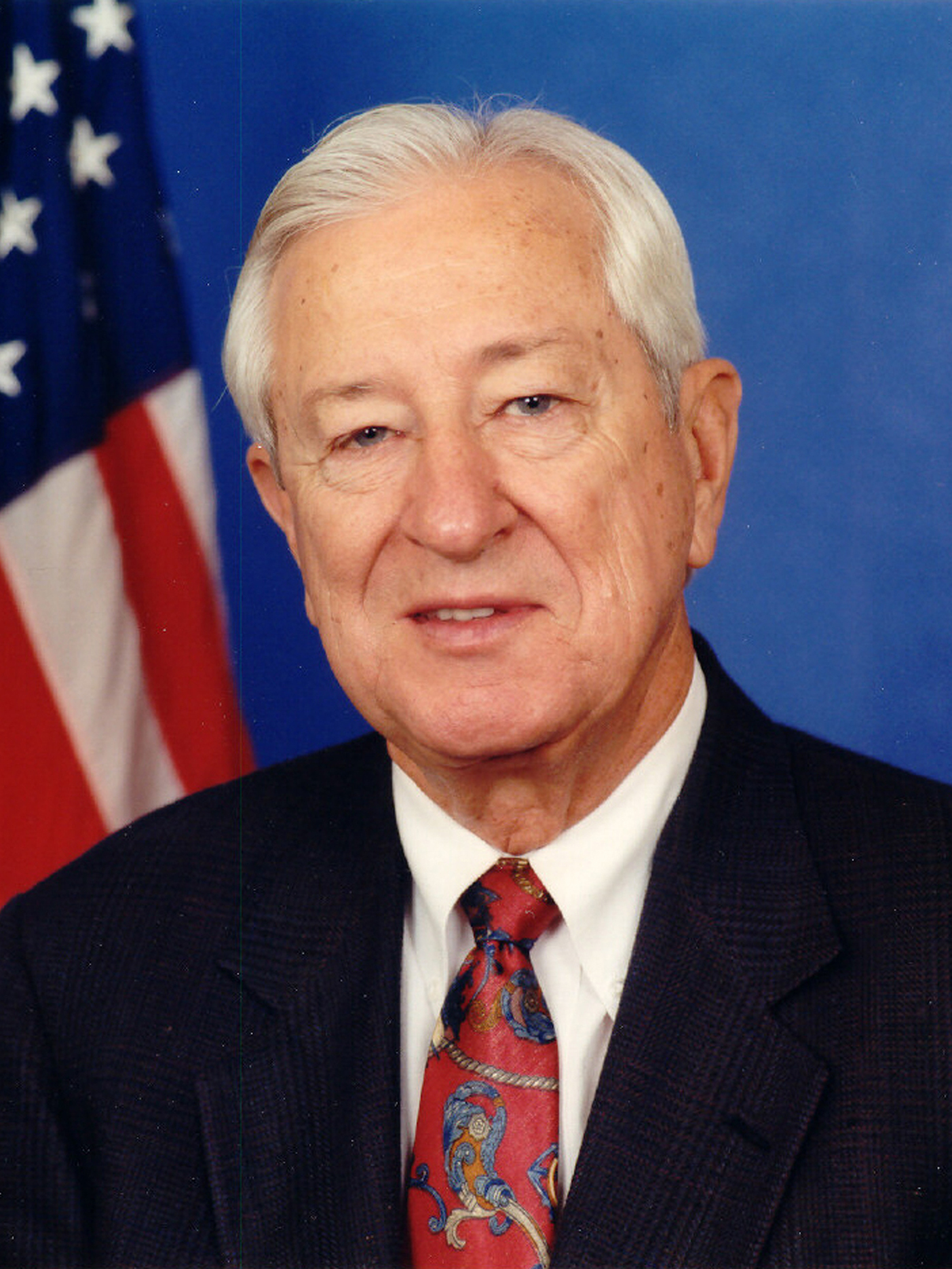

Nominee	Ralph M. Hall	Jon Newton
Party	Democratic	Republican
Popular vote	145,887	91,574
Percentage	60.3%	37.9%
- County results Hall: 40–50% 50–60% 60–70% 70–80% Newton: 50–60%
U.S. Representative before election
Ralph M. Hall
Democratic
Elected U.S. Representative
Ralph M. Hall
Democratic

Incumbent Democrat Ralph Hall ran for re-election.

Texas's 4th congressional district, 2000
Party	Candidate	Votes	%
Democratic	Ralph M. Hall (incumbent)	145,887	60.31
Republican	Jon Newton	91,574	37.86
Libertarian	Joe Turner	4,417	1.83
Total votes		241,878	100
Democratic hold			

== District 5 ==
2000 Texas's 5th congressional district election

Nominee	Pete Sessions	Regina Montoya Coggins
Party	Republican	Democratic
Popular vote	100,487	82,629
Percentage	54.0%	44.4%
- County results Coggins: 50–60% 60–70% 70–80% Sessions: 50–60% 60–70%
U.S. Representative before election
Pete Sessions
Republican
Elected U.S. Representative
Pete Sessions
Republican

Incumbent Republican Pete Sessions ran for re-election.

Texas's 5th congressional district, 2000
Party	Candidate	Votes	%
Republican	Pete Sessions (incumbent)	100,487	54.04
Democratic	Regina Montoya Coggins	82,629	44.43
Libertarian	Ken Ashby	2,842	1.53
Total votes		185,958	100
Republican hold			

== District 6 ==
2000 Texas's 6th congressional district election
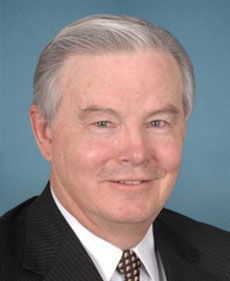

Nominee	Joe Barton	Frank Brady
Party	Republican	Libertarian
Popular vote	183,712	30,056
Percentage	73.9%	11.9%
U.S. Representative before election
Joe Barton
Republican
Elected U.S. Representative
Joe Barton
Republican

Incumbent Republican Joe Barton ran for re-election.

Texas's 6th congressional district, 2000
Party	Candidate	Votes	%
Republican	Joe Barton (incumbent)	183,712	73.90
Libertarian	Frank Brady	30,056	11.89
Total votes		252,741	100
Republican hold			

== District 7 ==
2000 Texas's 7th congressional district election
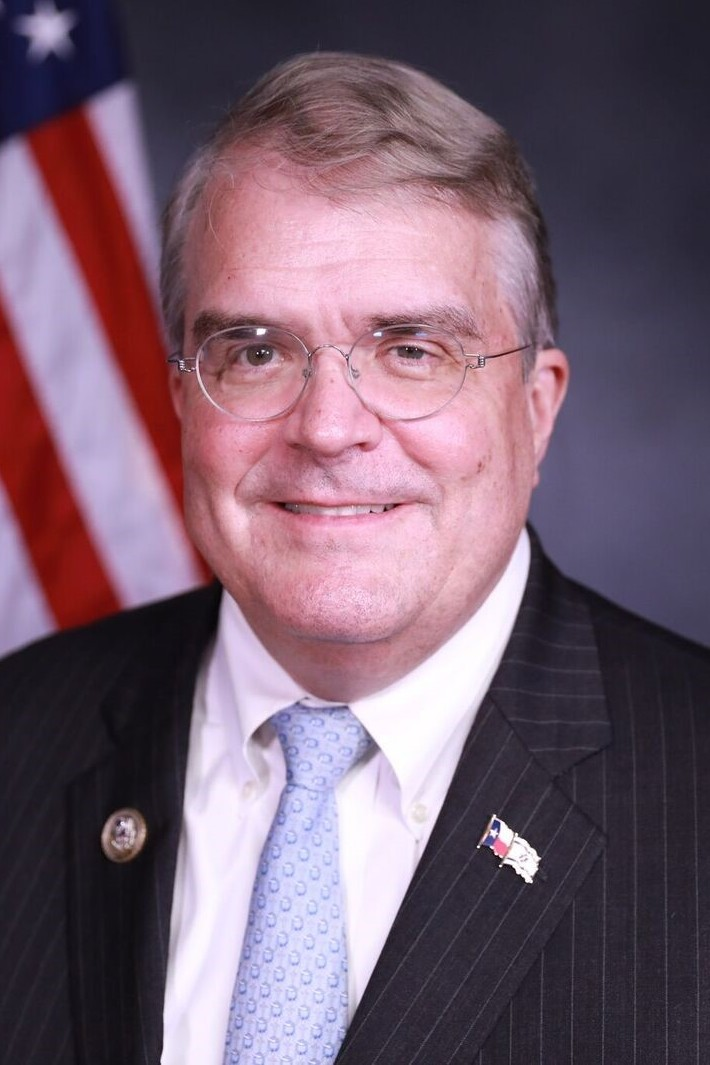

Nominee	John Culberson	Jeff Sell
Party	Republican	Democratic
Popular vote	183,712	60,694
Percentage	73.9%	24.4%
- County results Culberson: 70–80%
U.S. Representative before election
Bill Archer
Republican
Elected U.S. Representative
John Culberson
Republican

Incumbent Republican Bill Archer opted to retire rather than run for re-election.

Texas's 7th congressional district, 2000
Party	Candidate	Votes	%
Republican	John Culberson	183,712	73.90
Democratic	Jeff Sell	60,694	24.42
Libertarian	Drew Parks	4,182	1.68
Write-in	John Skone-Palmer	5	0.00
Total votes		248,593	100
Republican hold			

== District 8 ==
2000 Texas's 8th congressional district election
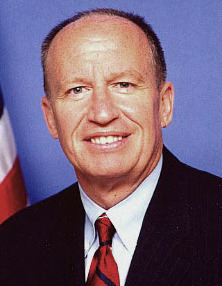

Nominee	Kevin Brady	Gil Guillory
Party	Republican	Libertarian
Popular vote	233,848	21,368
Percentage	91.6%	8.4%
- County results Brady: 80–90% 90–100%
U.S. Representative before election
Kevin Brady
Republican
Elected U.S. Representative
Kevin Brady
Republican

Incumbent Republican Kevin Brady ran for re-election.

Texas's 8th congressional district, 2000
Party	Candidate	Votes	%
Republican	Kevin Brady (incumbent)	233,848	91.63
Libertarian	Gil Guillory	21,368	8.37
Total votes		255,216	100
Republican hold			

== District 9 ==
2000 Texas's 9th congressional district election
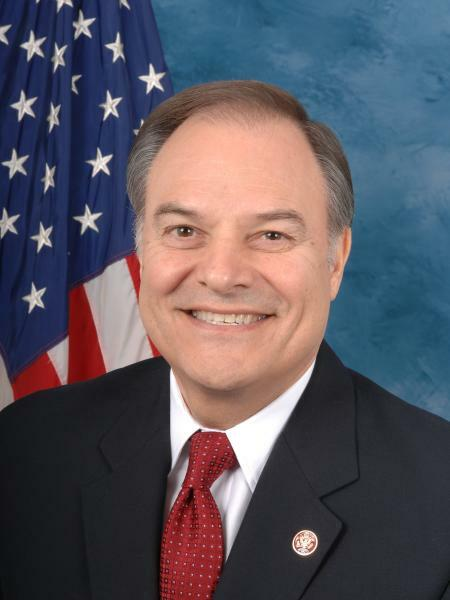

Nominee	Nick Lampson	Paul Williams
Party	Democratic	Republican
Popular vote	130,143	87,165
Percentage	59.2%	39.6%
- County results Lampson: 50–60% 70–80% Williams: 50–60%
U.S. Representative before election
Nick Lampson
Democratic
Elected U.S. Representative
Nick Lampson
Democratic

Incumbent Democrat Nick Lampson ran for re-election.

Texas's 9th congressional district, 2000
Party	Candidate	Votes	%
Democratic	Nick Lampson (incumbent)	130,143	59.21
Republican	Paul Williams	87,165	39.65
Libertarian	F. Charles Knipp	2,508	1.14
Total votes		219,816	100
Democratic hold			

== District 10 ==
2000 Texas's 10th congressional district election
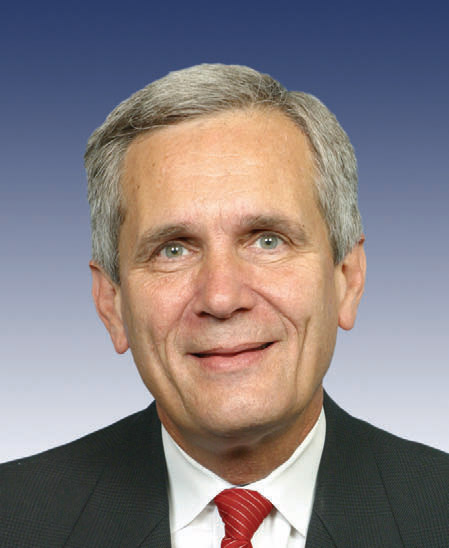

Nominee	Lloyd Doggett	Michael Davis
Party	Democratic	Libertarian
Popular vote	203,628	37,203
Percentage	84.5%	15.4%
- County results Doggett: 80–90%
U.S. Representative before election
Lloyd Doggett
Democratic
Elected U.S. Representative
Lloyd Doggett
Democratic

Incumbent Democrat Lloyd Doggett ran for re-election.

Texas's 10th congressional district, 2000
Party	Candidate	Votes	%
Democratic	Lloyd Doggett (incumbent)	203,628	84.55
Libertarian	Michael Davis	37,203	15.45
Total votes		240,831	100
Democratic hold			

== District 11 ==
2000 Texas's 11th congressional district election
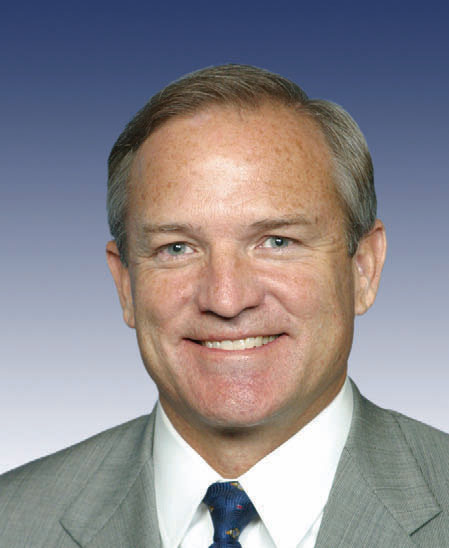

Nominee	Chet Edwards	Ramsey Farley
Party	Democratic	Republican
Popular vote	105,782	85,546
Percentage	54.8%	44.3%
- County results Edwards: 50–60% 60–70% Farley: 50–60%
U.S. Representative before election
Chet Edwards
Democratic
Elected U.S. Representative
Chet Edwards
Democratic

Incumbent Democrat Chet Edwards ran for re-election.

Texas's 11th congressional district, 2000
Party	Candidate	Votes	%
Democratic	Chet Edwards (incumbent)	105,782	54.83
Republican	Ramsey Farley	85,546	44.34
Libertarian	Mark Swanstrom	1,590	0.82
Total votes		192,918	100
Democratic hold			

== District 12 ==
2000 Texas's 12th congressional district election
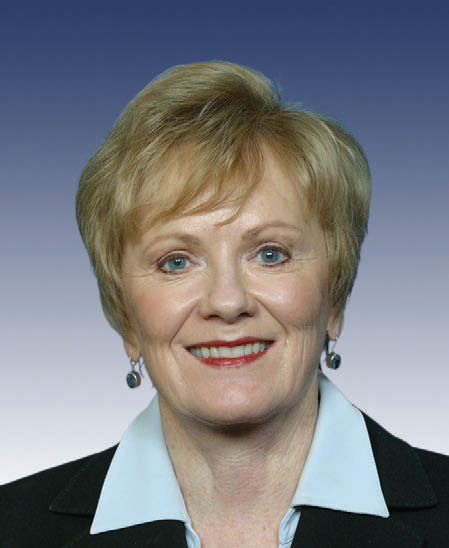

Nominee	Kay Granger	Mark Greene
Party	Republican	Democratic
Popular vote	117,739	67,612
Percentage	62.7%	36.0%
- County results Granger: 60–70% 70–80%
U.S. Representative before election
Kay Granger
Republican
Elected U.S. Representative
Kay Granger
Republican

Incumbent Republican Kay Granger ran for re-election.

Texas's 12th congressional district, 2000
Party	Candidate	Votes	%
Republican	Kay Granger (incumbent)	117,739	62.66
Democratic	Mark Greene	67,612	35.98
Libertarian	Ricky Clay	2,565	1.36
Total votes		187,916	100
Republican hold			

== District 13 ==
2000 Texas's 13th congressional district election
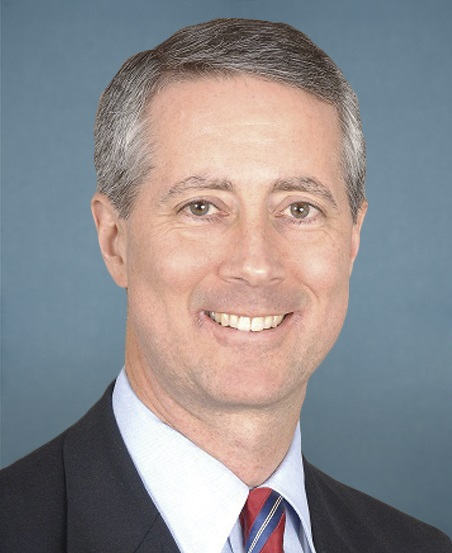

Nominee	Mac Thornberry	Curtis Clinesmith
Party	Republican	Democratic
Popular vote	117,995	54,343
Percentage	67.6%	31.1%
- County results Thornberry: 50–60% 60–70% 70–80% 80–90% Clinesmith: 40–50% 50–60% 60–70%
U.S. Representative before election
Mac Thornberry
Republican
Elected U.S. Representative
Mac Thornberry
Republican

Incumbent Republican Mac Thornberry ran for re-election.

Texas's 13th congressional district, 2000
Party	Candidate	Votes	%
Republican	Mac Thornberry (incumbent)	117,995	67.63
Democratic	Curtis Clinesmith	54,343	31.15
Libertarian	Brad Clardy	2,137	1.22
Total votes		174,475	100
Republican hold			

== District 14 ==
2000 Texas's 14th congressional district election
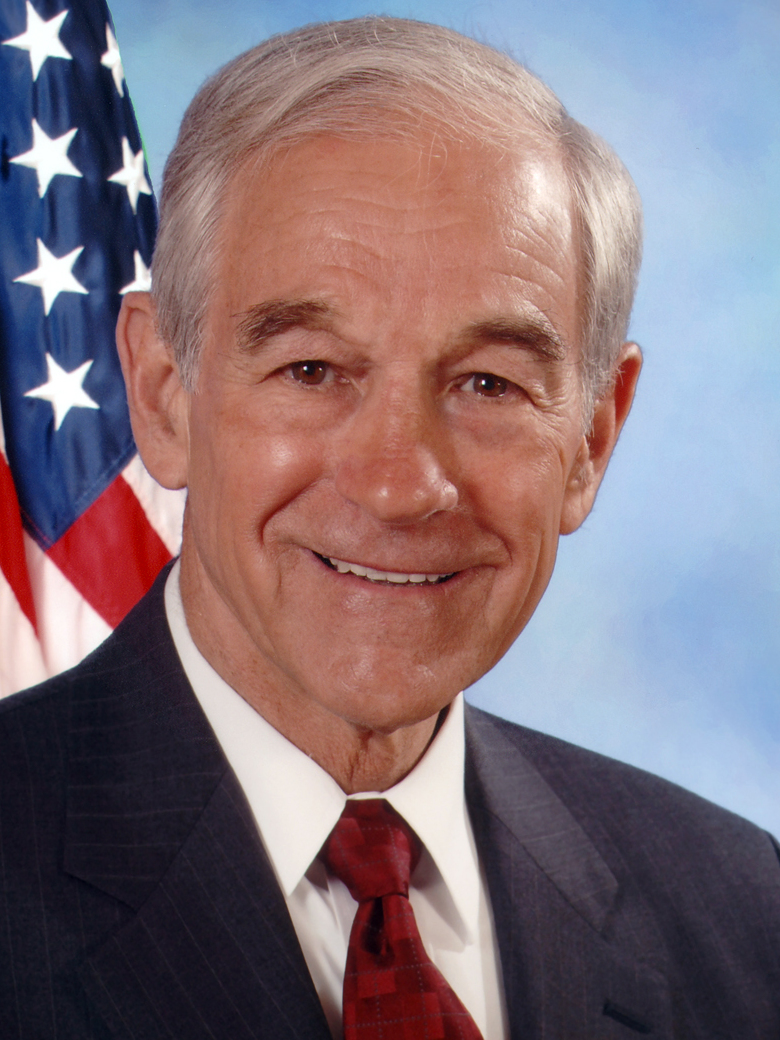

Nominee	Ron Paul	Loy Sneary
Party	Republican	Democratic
Popular vote	137,370	92,689
Percentage	59.7%	40.3%
- County results Paul: 50–60% 60–70% 70–80% Sneary: 50–60%
U.S. Representative before election
Ron Paul
Republican
Elected U.S. Representative
Ron Paul
Republican

Incumbent Republican Ron Paul ran for re-election.

Texas's 14th congressional district, 2000
Party	Candidate	Votes	%
Republican	Ron Paul (incumbent)	137,370	59.71
Democratic	Loy Sneary	92,689	40.29
Total votes		230,059	100
Republican hold			

== District 15 ==
2000 Texas's 15th congressional district election
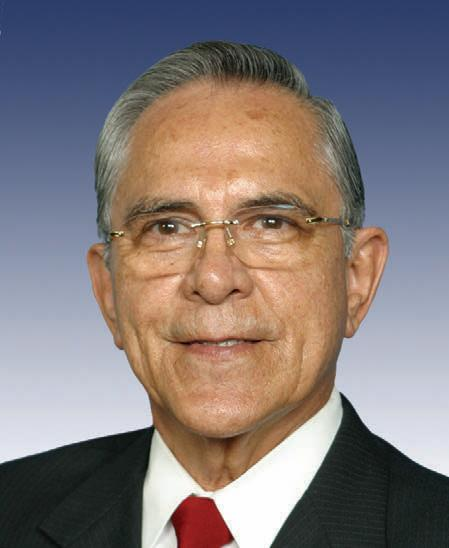

Nominee	Ruben Hinojosa	Frank Jones
Party	Democratic	Libertarian
Popular vote	106,570	13,167
Percentage	88.5%	10.9%
- County results Hinojosa: 70–80% 80–90% 90–100%
U.S. Representative before election
Ruben Hinojosa
Democratic
Elected U.S. Representative
Ruben Hinojosa
Democratic

Incumbent Democrat Ruben Hinojosa ran for re-election.

Texas's 15th congressional district, 2000
Party	Candidate	Votes	%
Democratic	Ruben Hinojosa (incumbent)	106,570	88.48
Libertarian	Frank Jones	13,167	10.93
Write-in	Israel Cantu	711	0.59
Total votes		120,448	100
Democratic hold			

== District 16 ==
2000 Texas's 16th congressional district election
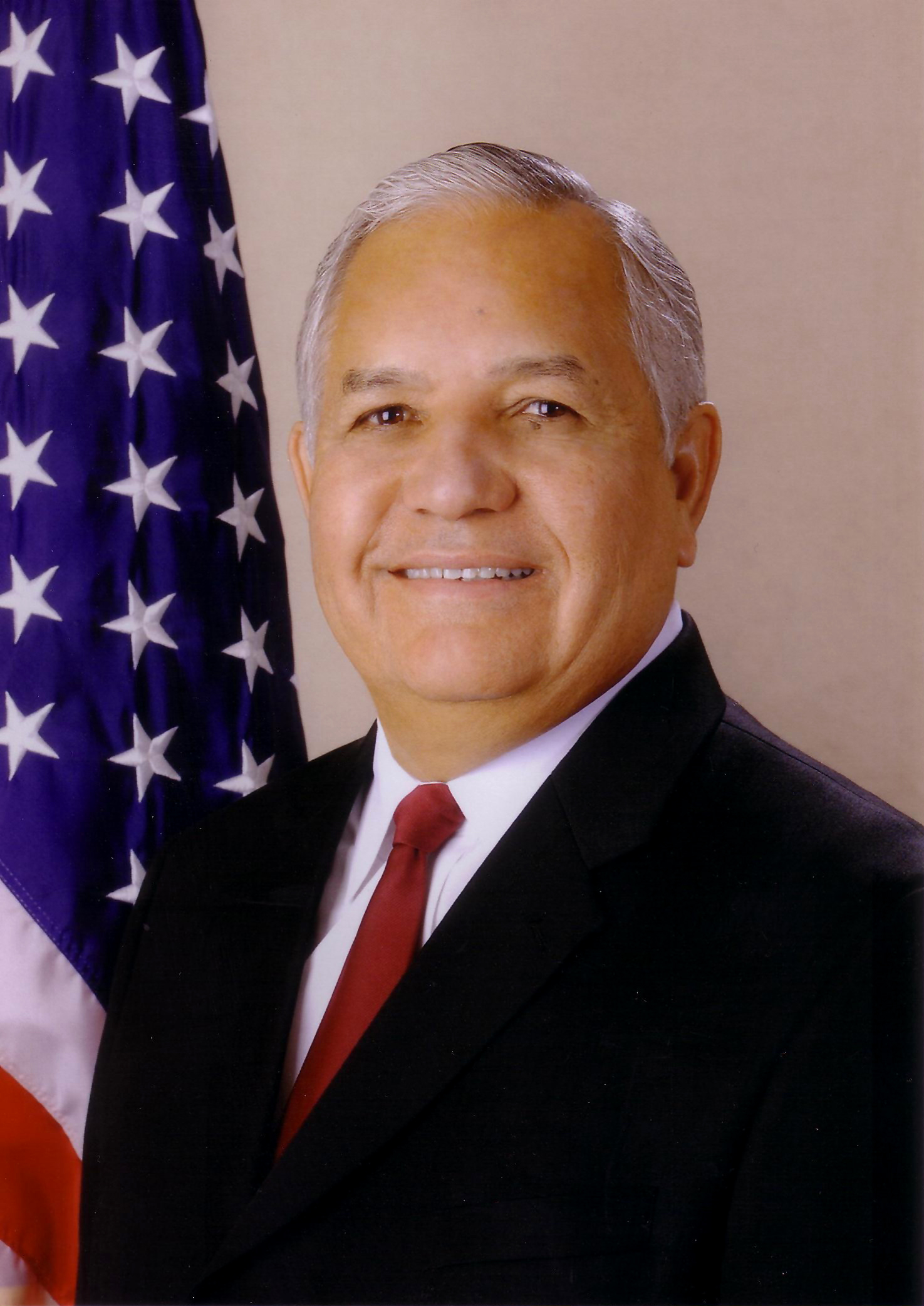

Nominee	Silvestre Reyes	Daniel Power
Party	Democratic	Republican
Popular vote	92,649	40,921
Percentage	68.3%	30.2%
- County results Reyes: 60–70%
U.S. Representative before election
Silvestre Reyes
Democratic
Elected U.S. Representative
Silvestre Reyes
Democratic

Incumbent Democrat Silvestre Reyes ran for re-election.

Texas's 16th congressional district, 2000
Party	Candidate	Votes	%
Democratic	Silvestre Reyes (incumbent)	92,649	68.30
Republican	Daniel Power	40,921	30.17
Libertarian	Dan Moser	2,080	1.53
Total votes		135,650	100
Democratic hold			

== District 17 ==
2000 Texas's 17th congressional district election
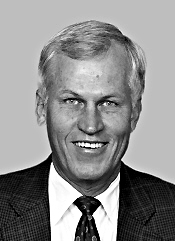

Nominee	Charles Stenholm	Darrell Clements	Debra Monde
Party	Democratic	Republican	Libertarian
Popular vote	120,670	72,535	11,180
Percentage	59.0%	35.5%	5.5%
- County results Stenholm: 50–60% 60–70% 70–80% Clements: 50–60%
U.S. Representative before election
Charles Stenholm
Democratic
Elected U.S. Representative
Charles Stenholm
Democratic

Incumbent Democrat Charles Stenholm ran for re-election.

Texas's 17th congressional district, 2000
Party	Candidate	Votes	%
Democratic	Charles Stenholm (incumbent)	120,670	59.03
Republican	Darrell Clements	72,535	35.48
Libertarian	Debra Monde	11,180	5.47
Write-in	Pete Julia	45	0.02
Total votes		204,430	100
Democratic hold			

== District 18 ==
2000 Texas's 18th congressional district election
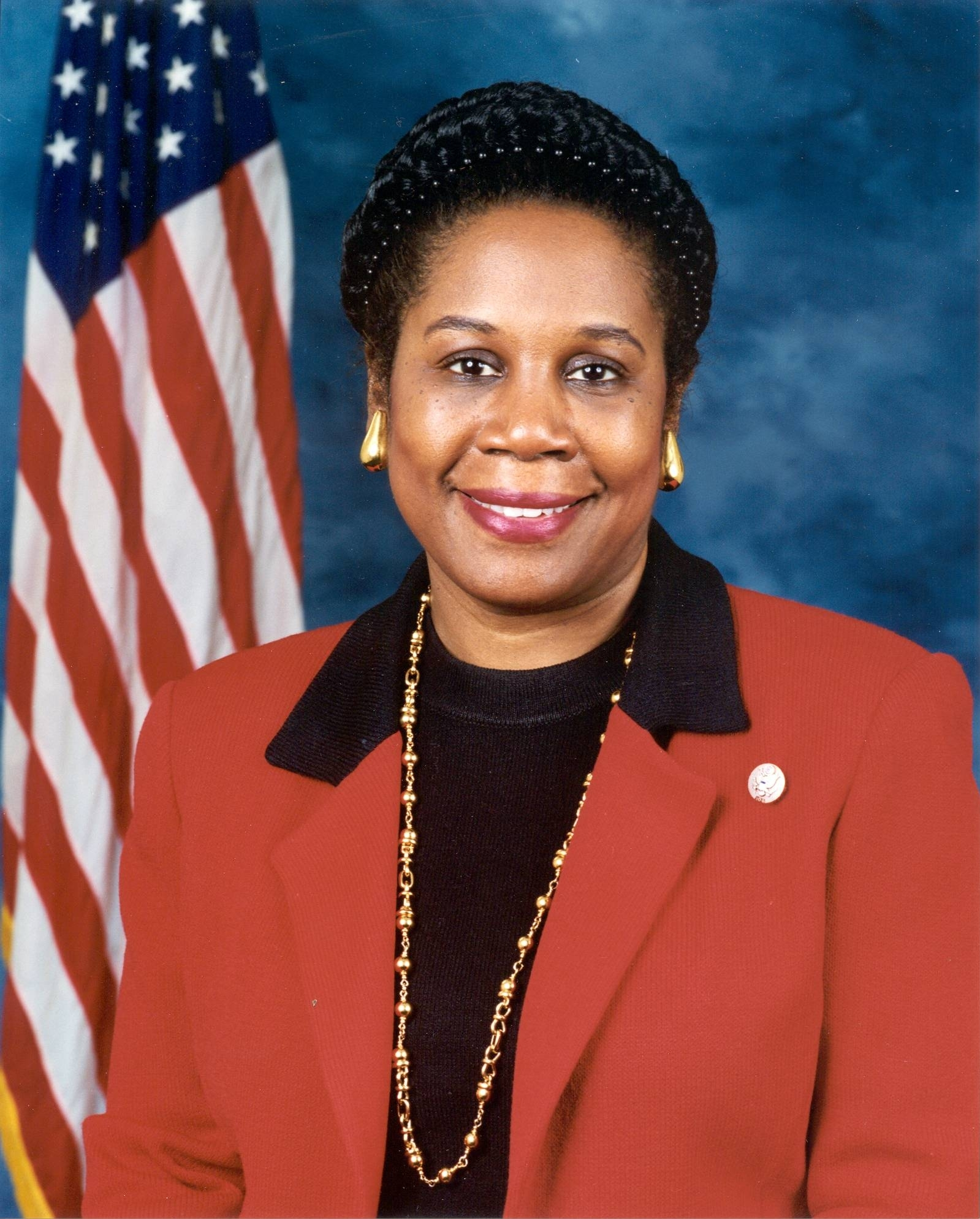

Nominee	Sheila Jackson Lee	Bob Levy
Party	Democratic	Republican
Popular vote	131,857	38,191
Percentage	76.5%	22.2%
- County results Lee: 70–80%
U.S. Representative before election
Sheila Jackson Lee
Democratic
Elected U.S. Representative
Sheila Jackson Lee
Democratic

Incumbent Democrat Sheila Jackson Lee ran for re-election.

Texas's 18th congressional district, 2000
Party	Candidate	Votes	%
Democratic	Sheila Jackson Lee (incumbent)	131,857	76.49
Republican	Bob Levy	38,191	22.16
Libertarian	Colin Nankervis	2,330	1.35
Total votes		172,378	100
Democratic hold			

== District 19 ==
2000 Texas's 19th congressional district election
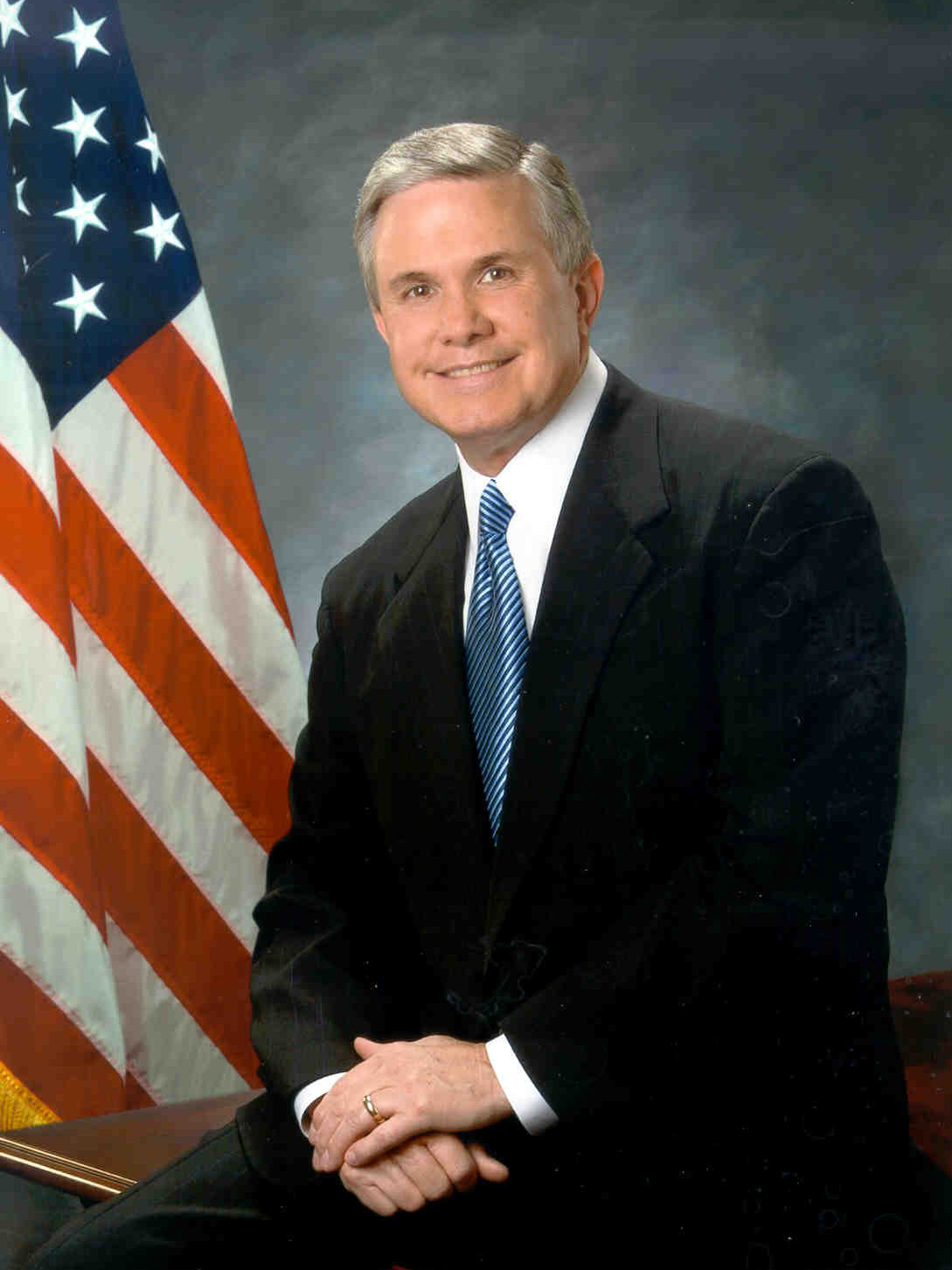

Nominee	Larry Combest	John Turnbow
Party	Republican	Libertarian
Popular vote	170,319	15,579
Percentage	91.6%	8.4%
- County results Combest: 90–100%
U.S. Representative before election
Larry Combest
Republican
Elected U.S. Representative
Larry Combest
Republican

Incumbent Republican Larry Combest ran for re-election.

Texas's 19th congressional district, 2000
Party	Candidate	Votes	%
Republican	Larry Combest (incumbent)	170,319	91.62
Libertarian	John Turnbow	15,579	8.38
Total votes		185,898	100
Republican hold			

== District 20 ==
2000 Texas's 20th congressional district election
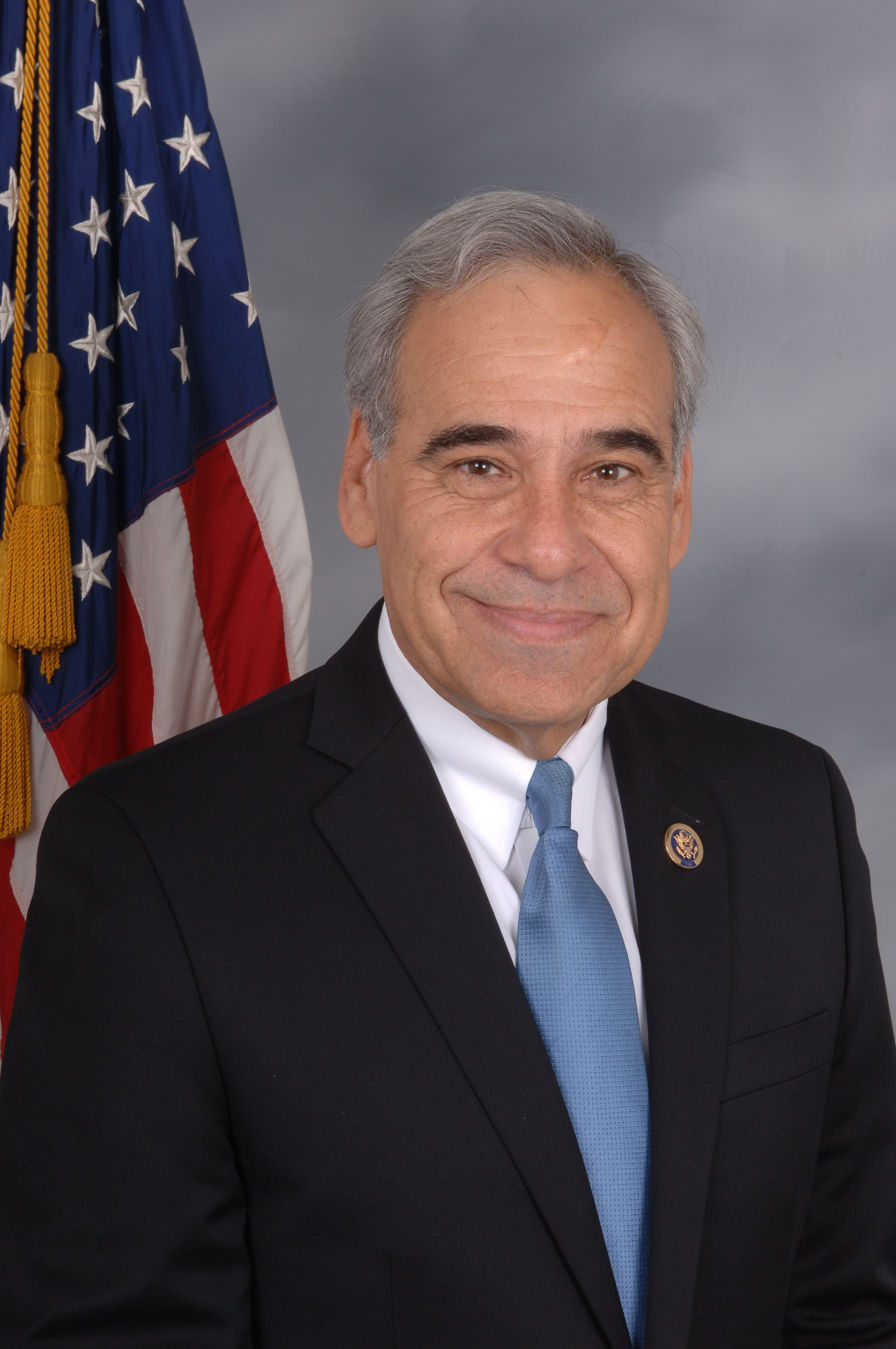

Nominee	Charlie Gonzalez	Alex De Pena
Party	Democratic	Libertarian
Popular vote	107,487	15,087
Percentage	87.7%	12.3%
- County results Gonzalez: 80–90%
U.S. Representative before election
Charlie Gonzalez
Democratic
Elected U.S. Representative
Charlie Gonzalez
Democratic

Incumbent Democrat Charlie Gonzalez ran for re-election.

Texas's 20th congressional district, 2000
Party	Candidate	Votes	%
Democratic	Charlie Gonzalez (incumbent)	107,487	87.69
Libertarian	Alex De Pena	15,087	12.31
Total votes		122,574	100
Democratic hold			

== District 21 ==
2000 Texas's 21st congressional district election
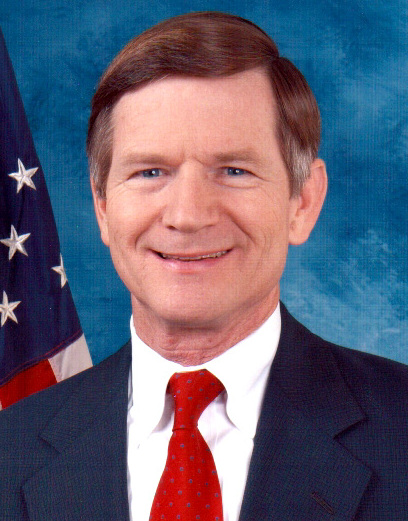

Nominee	Lamar Smith	Jim Green
Party	Republican	Democratic
Popular vote	251,049	73,326
Percentage	75.9%	22.2%
- County results Smith: 60–70% 70–80% 80–90% 90–100%
U.S. Representative before election
Lamar Smith
Republican
Elected U.S. Representative
Lamar Smith
Republican

Incumbent Republican Lamar Smith ran for re-election.

Texas's 21st congressional district, 2000
Party	Candidate	Votes	%
Republican	Lamar Smith (incumbent)	251,049	75.87
Democratic	Jim Green	73,326	22.16
Libertarian	Jinx Steinbrecher	6,503	1.97
Total votes		330,878	100
Republican hold			

== District 22 ==
2000 Texas's 22nd congressional district election
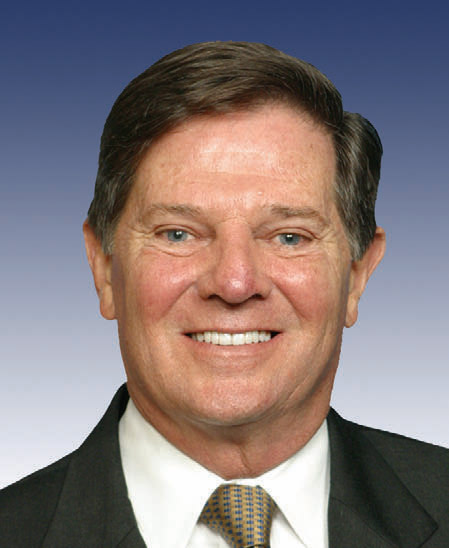

Nominee	Tom DeLay	Jo Ann Matranga
Party	Republican	Democratic
Popular vote	154,662	92,645
Percentage	60.4%	36.1%
- County results Delay: 50–60% 60–70%
U.S. Representative before election
Tom DeLay
Republican
Elected U.S. Representative
Tom DeLay
Republican

Incumbent Republican Tom DeLay ran for re-election.

Texas's 22nd congressional district, 2000
Party	Candidate	Votes	%
Republican	Tom DeLay	154,662	60.35
Democratic	Jo Ann Matranga	92,645	36.15
Independent	Bob Schneider	5,577	2.18
Libertarian	Kent Probst	3,383	1.32
Total votes		256,267	100
Republican hold			

== District 23 ==
2000 Texas's 23rd congressional district election
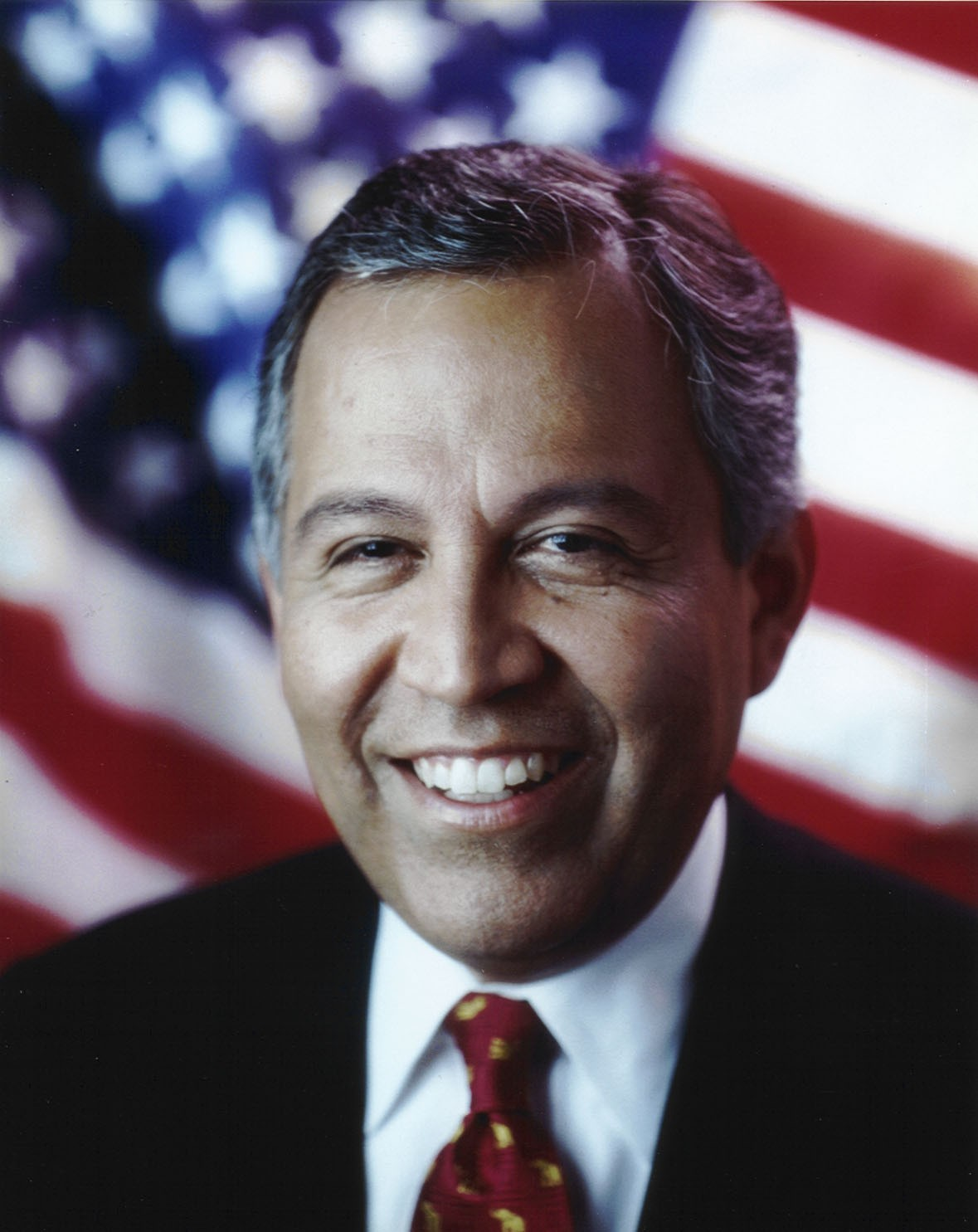

Nominee	Henry Bonilla	Isidro Garza
Party	Republican	Democratic
Popular vote	119,679	78,274
Percentage	59.3%	38.8%
- County results Bonilla: 50–60% 60–70% 70–80% 80–90% Isidro Garza: 50–60% 60–70% 70–80%
U.S. Representative before election
Henry Bonilla
Republican
Elected U.S. Representative
Henry Bonilla
Republican

Incumbent Republican Henry Bonilla ran for re-election.

Texas's 23rd congressional district, 2000
Party	Candidate	Votes	%
Republican	Henry Bonilla (incumbent)	119,679	59.32
Democratic	Isidro Garza	78,274	38.80
Libertarian	Jeffrey Blunt	3,801	1.88
Total votes		201,754	100
Republican hold			

== District 24 ==
2000 Texas's 24th congressional district election
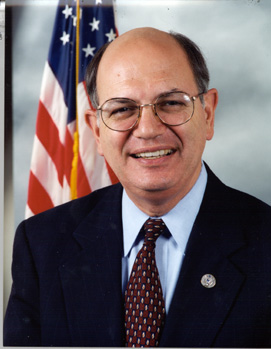

Nominee	Martin Frost	Bryndan Wright
Party	Democratic	Republican
Popular vote	103,152	61,235
Percentage	61.8%	36.7%
- County results Frost: 50–60% 60–70%
U.S. Representative before election
Martin Frost
Democratic
Elected U.S. Representative
Martin Frost
Democratic

Incumbent Democrat Martin Frost ran for re-election.

Texas's 24th congressional district, 2000
Party	Candidate	Votes	%
Democratic	Martin Frost (incumbent)	103,152	61.79
Republican	Bryndan Wright	61,235	36.68
Libertarian	Bob Worthington	2,561	1.53
Total votes		166,948	100
Democratic hold			

== District 25 ==
2000 Texas's 25th congressional district election
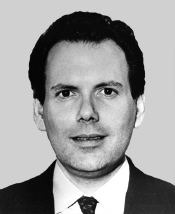

Nominee	Ken Bentsen	Phil Sudan
Party	Democratic	Republican
Popular vote	106,112	68,010
Percentage	60.1%	38.5%
- County results Bentsen: 60–70%
U.S. Representative before election
Ken Bentsen
Democratic
Elected U.S. Representative
Ken Bentsen
Democratic

Incumbent Democrat Ken Bentsen ran for re-election.

=== General election ===
==== Polling ====
Poll source	Date(s)	Sample size	Margin of error	Ken Bentsen (D)	Phil Sudan (R)	Other / undecided (Note: Calculated by taking the difference of 100% and all other candidates combined.)
SurveyUSA	November 1, 2000	500	—	59%	39%	2%

==== Results ====
Texas's 25th congressional district, 2000
Party	Candidate	Votes	%
Democratic	Ken Bentsen (incumbent)	106,112	60.11
Republican	Phil Sudan	68,010	38.53
Libertarian	Clifford Lee Messina	2,400	1.36
Total votes		176,522	100
Democratic hold			

== District 26 ==
2000 Texas's 26th congressional district election
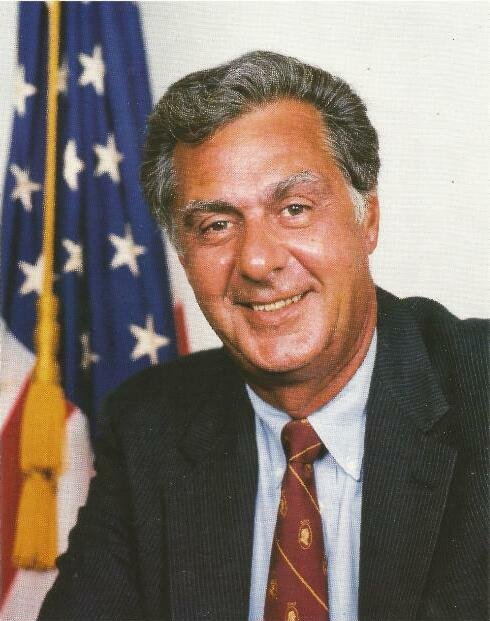

Nominee	Dick Armey	Steve Love
Party	Republican	Democratic
Popular vote	214,025	75,601
Percentage	72.5%	25.6%
- County results Armey: 70–80% 80–90%
U.S. Representative before election
Dick Armey
Republican
Elected U.S. Representative
Dick Armey
Republican

Incumbent Republican Dick Armey ran for re-election.

Texas's 26th congressional district, 2000
Party	Candidate	Votes	%
Republican	Dick Armey (incumbent)	214,025	72.48
Democratic	Steve Love	75,601	25.60
Libertarian	Fred Badagnani	5,646	1.91
Total votes		295,272	100
Republican hold			

== District 27 ==
2000 Texas's 27th congressional district election
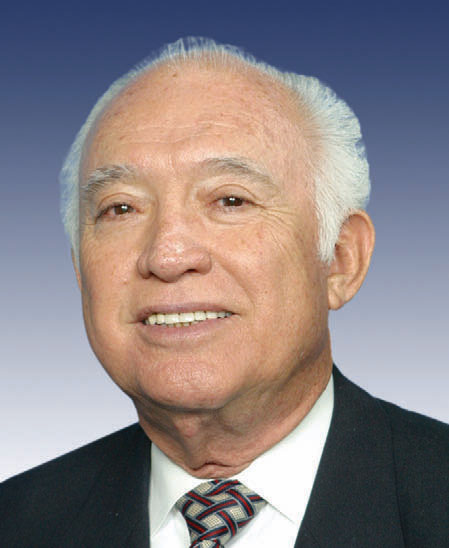

Nominee	Solomon Ortiz	Pat Ahumada
Party	Democratic	Republican
Popular vote	102,088	54,660
Percentage	63.4%	33.9%
- County results Ortiz: 60–70% 70–80%
U.S. Representative before election
Solomon Ortiz
Democratic
Elected U.S. Representative
Solomon Ortiz
Democratic

Incumbent Democrat Solomon Ortiz ran for re-election.

Texas's 27th congressional district, 2000
Party	Candidate	Votes	%
Democratic	Solomon Ortiz (incumbent)	102,088	63.38
Republican	Pat Ahumada	54,660	33.94
Libertarian	William Bunch	4,324	2.68
Total votes		161,072	100
Democratic hold			

== District 28 ==
2000 Texas's 28th congressional district election
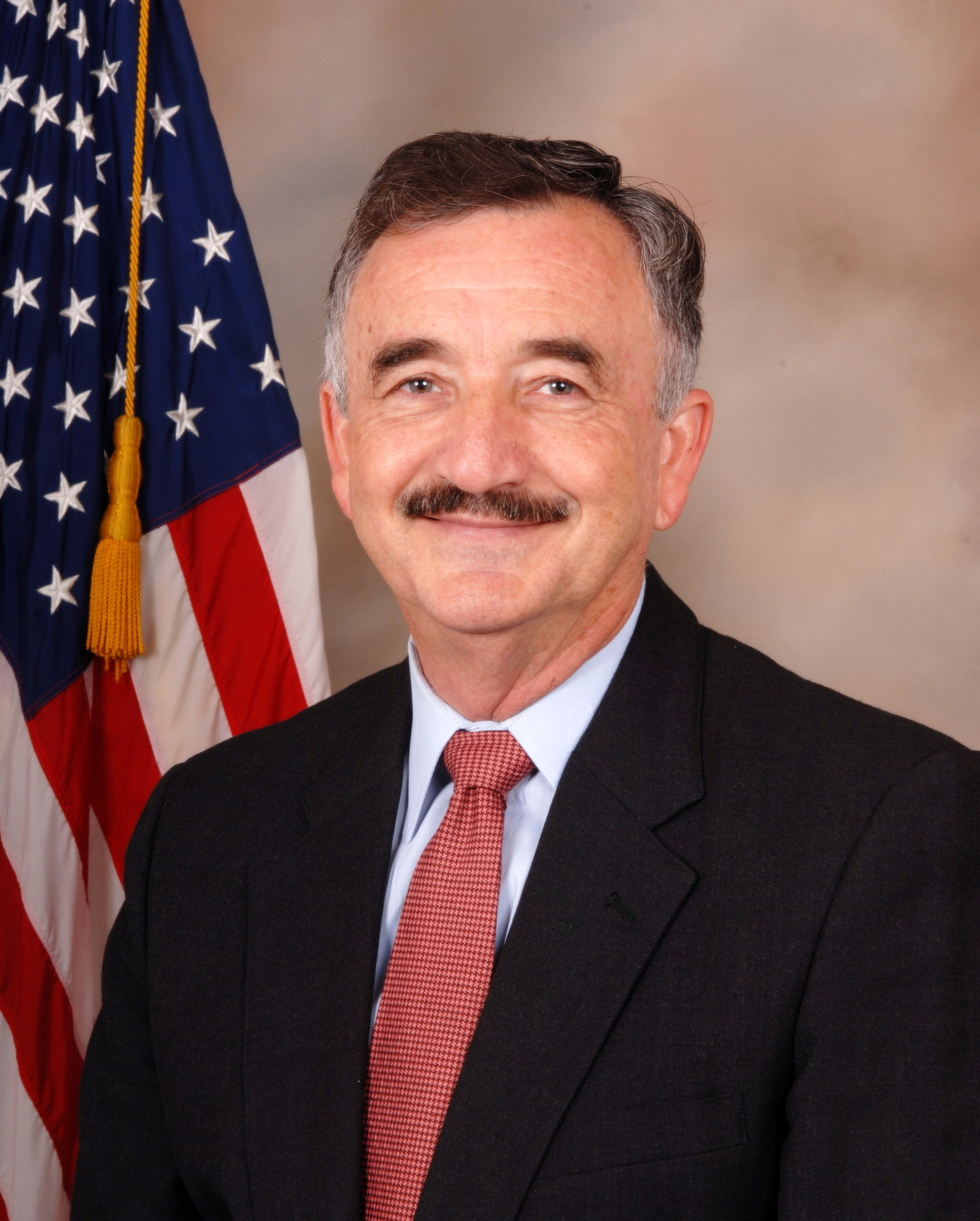

Nominee	Ciro Rodriguez	William Stallknecht
Party	Democratic	Libertarian
Popular vote	123,104	15,156
Percentage	89.0%	11.0%
- County results Rodriguez: 70–80% 80–90% 90–100%
U.S. Representative before election
Ciro Rodriguez
Democratic
Elected U.S. Representative
Ciro Rodriguez
Democratic

Incumbent Democrat Ciro Rodriquez ran for re-election.

Texas's 28th congressional district, 2000
Party	Candidate	Votes	%
Democratic	Ciro Rodriguez (incumbent)	123,104	89.04
Libertarian	William Stallknecht	15,156	10.96
Total votes		138,260	100
Democratic hold			

== District 29 ==
2000 Texas's 29th congressional district election
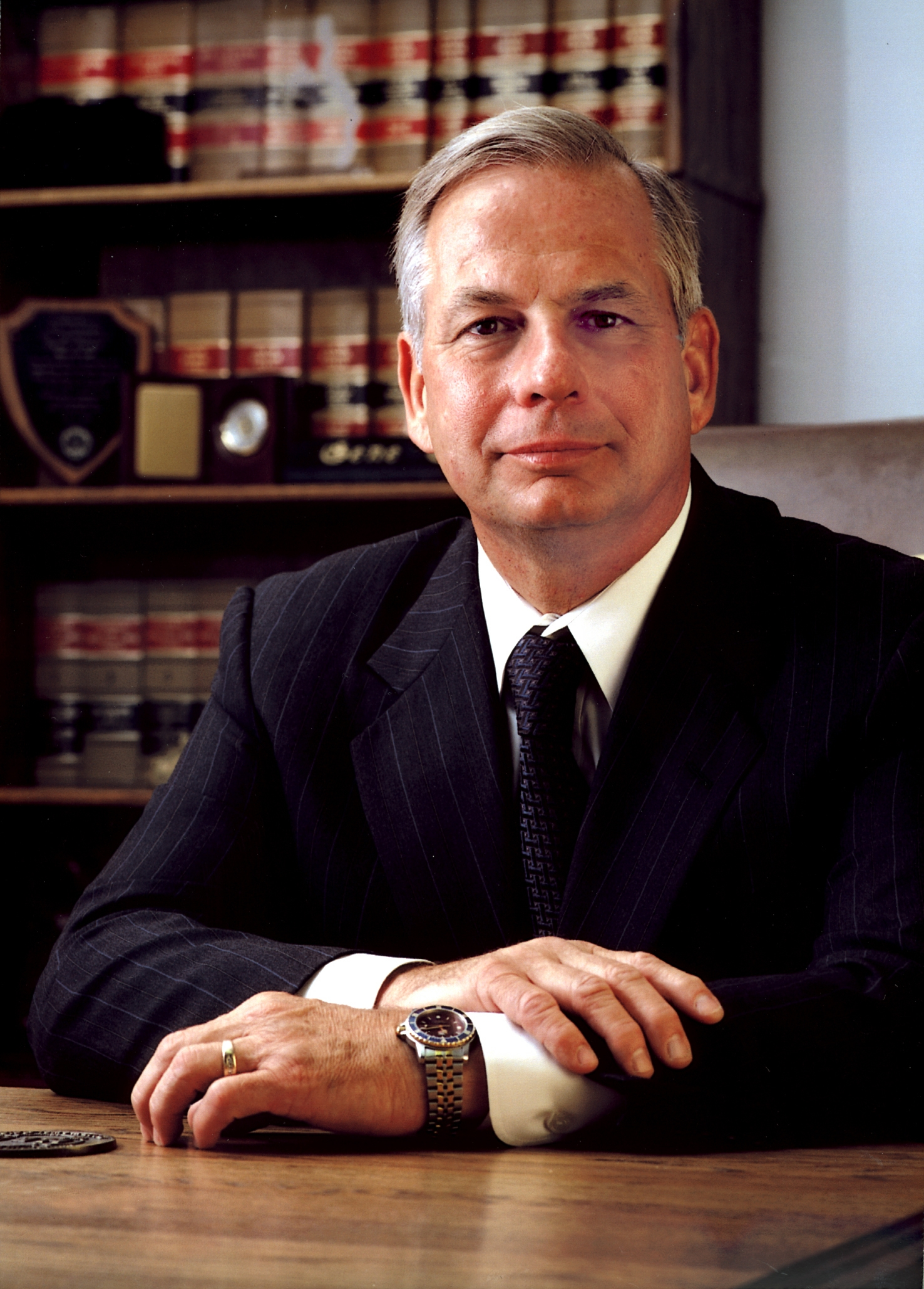

Nominee	Gene Green	Joe Vu
Party	Democratic	Republican
Popular vote	84,665	29,606
Percentage	73.3%	25.6%
- County results Green: 70–80%
U.S. Representative before election
Gene Green
Democratic
Elected U.S. Representative
Gene Green
Democratic

Incumbent Democrat Gene Green ran for re-election.

Texas's 29th congressional district, 2000
Party	Candidate	Votes	%
Democratic	Gene Green (incumbent)	84,665	73.32
Republican	Joe Vu	29,606	25.64
Libertarian	Ray Dittmar	1,204	1.04
Total votes		115,475	100
Democratic hold			

== District 30 ==
2000 Texas's 30th congressional district election
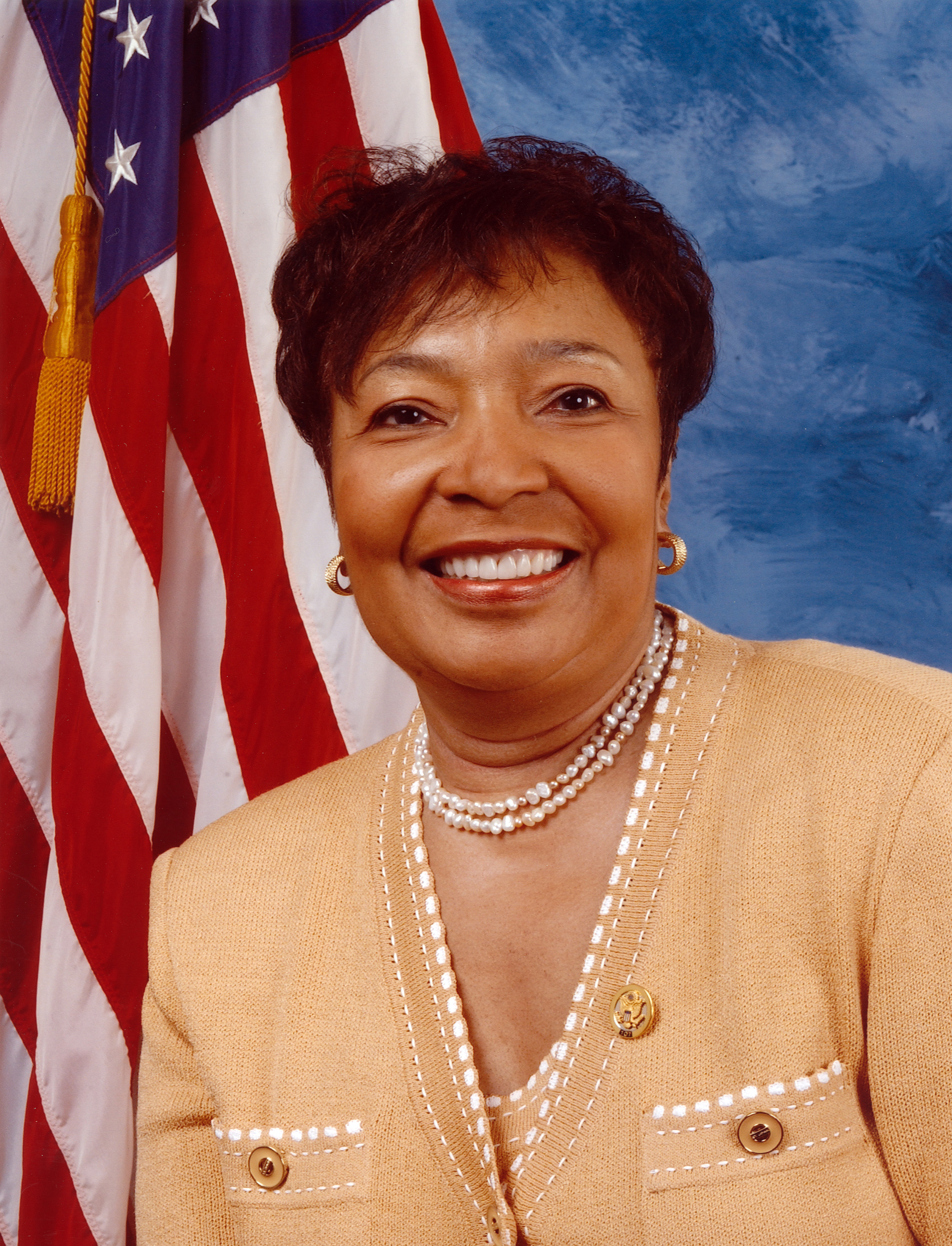

Nominee	Eddie Bernice Johnson	Kelly Rush
Party	Democratic	Libertarian
Popular vote	109,163	9,798
Percentage	91.8%	8.2%
- County results Johnson: 90–100%
U.S. Representative before election
Eddie Bernice Johnson
Democratic
Elected U.S. Representative
Eddie Bernice Johnson
Democratic

Incumbent Democrat Eddie Bernice Johnson ran for re-election.

Texas's 30th congressional district, 2000
Party	Candidate	Votes	%
Democratic	Eddie Bernice Johnson (incumbent)	109,163	91.76
Libertarian	Kelly Rush	9,798	8.24
Total votes		118,961	100
Democratic hold			
