= Steve Ogden =

American politician

Member of the Texas Senate from the 5th district
- In office February 4, 1997 – January 8, 2013
- Preceded by: Jim Turner
- Succeeded by: Charles Schwertner

Member of the Texas House of Representatives from the 14th district
- In office January 8, 1991 – January 28, 1997
- Preceded by: Richard A. Smith
- Succeeded by: Bill Roman

Personal details
- Born: September 21, 1950 (age 76)
- Party: Republican
- Spouse: Beverly Ogden (m. 1973)
- Children: 4
- Education: United States Naval Academy (BS); Texas A&M University (MBA)
- Occupation: Businessman

Steve Ogden (born 21 September 1950) is a businessman from Bryan, Texas, who is a former Republican member of the Texas Senate representing the 5th District. Ogden became a state senator in January 1997. He chaired Texas Senate Finance Committee. He has a Bachelor of Science degree from the United States Naval Academy in Annapolis, Maryland, and a Master of Business Administration degree from Texas A&M University in College Station.

== Business ==
Ogden has been in the oil and gas exploration business for more than two decades. He is president of Ogden Resources, an independent oil and gas company based in Bryan. Prior to entering the oil business, Ogden served for nine years as an officer in the U.S. Navy's nuclear submarine force.

Before his election to the Texas Senate, Ogden served three terms in the Texas House of Representatives.

== Recognition ==
As a state senator, Ogden was honored by the Texas County Judges and Commissioners Association, the Texas Association of District and County Attorneys, Scott & White, The Texas A&M University System, the Texas Veterans Commission, the Texas Municipal Police Association, and the Free Market Committee. Ogden received the sixth annual Bob Bullock Award for Outstanding Public Stewardship and was awarded the 2004 Defensor Pacem medal by Sam Houston State University in Huntsville. Following the 79th regular session of the Texas Legislature in 2005, he was named one of the "Ten Best Legislators" by Texas Monthly magazine, a "Top Legislator" by Capital Inside, and "Pro-Life Chairman of the Year" by Texas Right to Life.

== Personal ==
Steve and Beverly Ogden were married in December 1973 and live in Bryan. They are the parents of four children. Michael, a LtCol in the United States Marine Corps, and his wife Lisa are the parents of Gabriel and Canon Ogden. Stephanie and her husband William Lewis have two sons, Christopher and Will. Kristen, a graduate of the University of Texas at Austin, and her husband Cameron have two children. The youngest son is Charles Benedict Ogden.

== Election history ==
=== Most recent election ===
==== 2006 ====
Texas general election, 2006: Senate District 5
Party	Candidate	Votes	%	±%
Republican	Steve Ogden (Incumbent)	105,979	61.48	−25.38
Democratic	Stephen Wyman	59,671	34.62	+34.62
Libertarian	Darrell R. Grear	6,719	3.90	−9.25
Majority		46,308	26.87	−46.84
Turnout		172,369		22.59
Republican hold				

=== Previous elections ===
==== 2002 ====
Texas general election, 2002: Senate District 5
Party	Candidate	Votes	%	±%
Republican	Steve Ogden (Incumbent)	122,119	86.86	+31.19
Libertarian	Randall Barfield	18,482	13.14	+13.14
Majority		103,637	73.71	+62.38
Turnout		140,601		+1.35
Republican hold				

==== 1998 ====
Texas general election, 1998: Senate District 5
Party	Candidate	Votes	%	±%
Republican	Steve Ogden (Incumbent)	77,227	55.67	+0.21
Democratic	Mary M. Moore	61,508	44.33	−0.21
Majority		15,719	11.33	+0.41
Turnout		138,735		+262.17
Republican hold				

==== 1997 ====
Special election, 1997: Senate District 5, Unexpired term
Party	Candidate	Votes	%	±%
Democratic	Mary M. Moore	17,062	44.54	−11.45
Republican	Steve Ogden	21,245	55.46	+11.45
Majority		4,183	10.92	−1.06
Turnout		38,307		−74.01
Republican gain from Democratic				

==== 1996 ====
Texas general election, 1996: House District 14
Party	Candidate	Votes	%	±%
Republican	Steve Ogden (Incumbent)	24,402	100.00	
Majority		24,402	100.00	
Turnout		24,402		+14.43
Republican hold				

==== 1994 ====
Texas general election, 1994: House District 14
Party	Candidate	Votes	%	±%
Republican	Steve Ogden (Incumbent)	21,325	100.00	
Majority		21,325	100.00	
Turnout		21,325		−32.62
Republican hold				

==== 1992 ====
Texas general election, 1992: House District 14
Party	Candidate	Votes	%	±%
Republican	Steve Ogden (Incumbent)	31,649	100.00	
Majority		31,649	100.00	
Turnout		31,649		
Republican hold				

Texas Senate
Preceded by Jim Turner	Texas State Senator from District 5 (Bryan); 1997-2013	Succeeded by Charles Schwertner
Texas House of Representatives
Preceded by Richard A. Smith	Member of the Texas House of Representatives from District 14 (Bryan); 1991–1997	Succeeded by Bill Roman
