= Jim Turner (politician) =

American politician (born 1946)

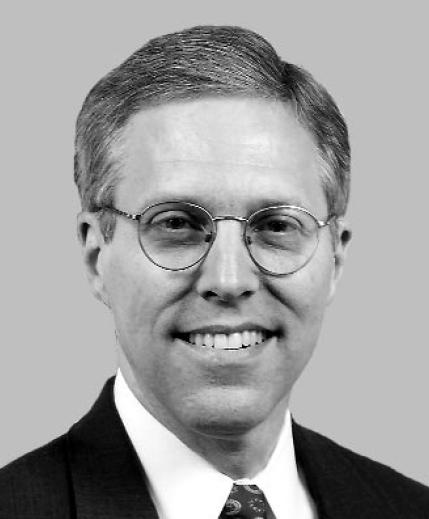

Ranking Member of the House Homeland Security Committee
- In office January 3, 2003 – January 3, 2005
- Preceded by: Nancy Pelosi
- Succeeded by: Bennie Thompson

Member of the U.S. House of Representatives from Texas's 2nd district
- In office January 3, 1997 – January 3, 2005
- Preceded by: Charlie Wilson
- Succeeded by: Kevin Brady (redistricted)

Member of the Texas Senate from the 5th district
- In office January 8, 1991 – January 2, 1997
- Preceded by: Kent Caperton
- Succeeded by: Steve Ogden

Member of the Texas House of Representatives from the 15th district
- In office January 13, 1981 – March 17, 1984
- Preceded by: Emmett Whitehead
- Succeeded by: Mike McKinney

Personal details
- Born: James William Turner; February 6, 1946 (age 80) Fort Lewis, Washington, U.S.
- Party: Democratic
- Spouse: Ginny Turner (m. 1970)
- Children: 2, including John
- Education: University of Texas, Austin (BA, MBA, JD)

Military service
- Branch/service: United States Army
- Years of service: 1970–1978

James William Turner (born February 6, 1946) is an American lawyer and politician who was the Democratic U.S. Representative for Texas's 2nd congressional district from 1997 until 2005.

== Early life, education, and early career ==
Turner was born in Fort Lewis, Washington, but reared in Crockett in Houston County in East Texas. He received a bachelor's degree in business, and simultaneously earned an MBA and a J.D., all from the University of Texas at Austin. Following graduation, he was commissioned in the United States Army and served eight years (active and reserve), attaining the rank of captain. His legal career in Texas included his own law practice in his hometown of Crockett, his partnership in the Austin office of Hughes & Luce, LLP and serving Of Counsel with Hance Scarborough, LLP.

== State politics ==
Prior to being elected to Congress, Turner held several state and local offices. He was a member of the Texas House of Representatives from 1981 to 1984, mayor of Crockett from 1989 to 1991, and a member of the Texas Senate from 1991 to 1996. He succeeded Kent Caperton of Bryan in the Senate. Caperton did not seek reelection in 1990, and Turner defeated the Republican Lou Zaeske, also of Bryan, head of the Texas English-only movement. For two years, Turner was an executive assistant to Texas Governor Mark White.

== U.S. House of Representatives ==
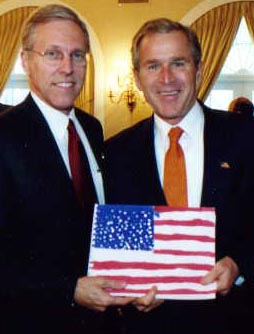
Turner with President George W. Bush in June 2003

In 1996, 2nd district U.S. Representative Charlie Wilson, known for his role in funding the resistance to Afghanistan's communist government, decided not to run for a thirteenth term. Turner won the Democratic nomination to succeed him and was handily elected in November 1996, when Bill Clinton was reelected as U.S. President. He was reelected three times with no substantive opposition. Congressman Turner sat on the House Armed Services Committee, and was the Ranking Member of the House Committee on Homeland Security. Considered a somewhat fiscally Conservative Democrat, Turner co-chaired the Blue Dog Coalition and was a member of the New Democrat Coalition.

In 2003, Turner was one of the targets of a highly controversial redistricting engineered by Tom DeLay. The Texas Legislature dismantled his district, which covered a large portion of East Texas stretching from Lufkin to the suburbs of Houston, and split its territory among three districts. The largest portion was shifted to the 8th District, represented by Republican Kevin Brady, who had been elected the same year as Turner. While the new 8th was geographically more Turner's district than Brady's, most of the 8th's vote was cast in heavily Republican Montgomery County, which had as many people as the rest of the district combined. His home in Crockett was thrown into the Fort Worth/Arlington-based 6th district, an even more Republican area represented by the then ten-term incumbent Joe Barton. Barton represented 96 percent of the population of the new district. Believing that he stood no realistic chance of staying in Congress, Turner decided not to seek a fifth term in 2004.

== Post-political career ==
He was briefly mentioned in 2006 as a potential candidate for governor of Texas against Rick Perry or the United States Senate seat then held by Republican Kay Bailey Hutchison but now the domain of Senator Ted Cruz.

In 2005, Turner joined the Washington office of Arnold & Porter, LLP as the head of the Public Policy and Legislative Practice Group. In 2017, he became associated with the Austin law firm of Hance Scarborough, LLP, where he is Of Counsel and works in their government relations practice group.

== Personal life ==
He and his wife, Ginny, were married in 1970. They have two children: John Turner, who represented District 114 in the Texas House of Representatives and practices at the Dallas law firm Haynes and Boone; and Susan Turner Nold, who is Director of the Annette Strauss Institute for Civic Life at the Moody College of Communication.

== Election history ==
=== 1994 ===
Texas general election, 1994: Senate District 5
Party	Candidate	Votes	%	±%
Democratic	Jim Turner (Incumbent)	82,541	55.99	−44.01
Republican	Jerry T. Thornton	64,875	44.01	+44.01
Majority		17,666	11.98	−88.02
Turnout		147,416		+9.30
Democratic hold				

=== 1992 ===
Texas general election, 1992: Senate District 5
Party	Candidate	Votes	%	±%
Democratic	Jim Turner (Incumbent)	134,875	100.00	
Majority		134,875	100.00	
Turnout		134,875		
Democratic hold				

U.S. House of Representatives
Preceded by Charlie Wilson	Member of the U.S. House of Representatives for Texas's 2nd congressional district 1997–2005	Succeeded by Ted Poe
Preceded by Nancy Pelosi	Ranking Member of the House Homeland Security Committee; 2003–2005	Succeeded by Bennie Thompson
Party political offices
Preceded by Chris John	Chair of the Blue Dog Coalition for Communications; 2001–2003; Served alongside: Chris John (Administration), Allen Boyd (Policy)	Succeeded by Baron Hill
Preceded by Chris John	Chair of the Blue Dog Coalition for Administration; 2003–2005; Served alongside: Baron Hill (Communications), Charles Stenholm (Policy)	Succeeded by Jim Matheson
U.S. order of precedence (ceremonial)
Preceded by Max Sandlin as Former U.S. Representative	Order of precedence of the United States as Former U.S. Representative	Succeeded by Filemon Vela Jr. as Former U.S. Representative
