= Ken Bentsen =

American politician (born 1959)

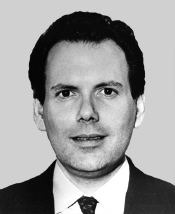

Member of the U.S. House of Representatives from Texas's 25th district
- In office January 3, 1995 – January 3, 2003
- Preceded by: Michael A. Andrews
- Succeeded by: Chris Bell

Personal details
- Born: Kenneth Edward Bentsen Jr. June 3, 1959 (age 67) Houston, Texas, U.S.
- Party: Democratic
- Children: 2
- Relatives: Lloyd Bentsen (uncle)
- Education: University of St. Thomas (BA); American University (MPA)

Kenneth Edward Bentsen Jr. (born June 3, 1959) is an American lobbyist and former politician from Texas, serving four terms in the United States House of Representatives from 1995 to 2003. He is the nephew of former senator and secretary of the treasury, Lloyd Bentsen.

== Early life and education ==
Born in Houston, Texas to Kenneth Sr. and Mary Bentsen, he graduated from Deerfield Academy in 1977. Bentsen earned a Bachelor of Arts degree from the University of St. Thomas in 1982 and a Master of Public Administration from American University in 1985.

== Career ==
From 1983 to 1987, he served on the staff of Congressman Ronald D. Coleman and from 1985 to 1987 was an associate staff member on the United States House Committee on Appropriations. Afterwards, he worked as an investment banker.

=== Congress ===
Bentsen was elected to the U.S. House of Representatives in 1994 and served from 1995 to 2003. As a congressman, he was one of 81 House Democrats who voted in favor of authorizing the invasion of Iraq on October 10, 2002. In 2002, Bentsen opted to run for the U.S. Senate to replace Phil Gramm; he then lost the Democratic primary to Dallas Mayor Ron Kirk who lost the general election to Texas Attorney General John Cornyn. In May, 2006, he became president of the Equipment Leasing Association in Washington, D.C.

=== Later career ===
Bentsen is the president and CEO of the Securities Industry and Financial Markets Association. He was named a "Top Lobbyist" by The Hill and one of "Washington's Most Influential People" by Washingtonian.

== Personal life ==
He has two daughters with wife Tamra Bentsen. The four reside in Washington, D.C.

U.S. House of Representatives
Preceded by Michael A. Andrews	Member of the U.S. House of Representatives from Texas's 25th congressional district 1995–2003	Succeeded by Chris Bell
U.S. order of precedence (ceremonial)
Preceded by Greg Laughlin as Former U.S. Representative	Order of precedence of the United States as Former U.S. Representative	Succeeded by Max Sandlin as Former U.S. Representative
