= Max Sandlin =

American politician (born 1952)

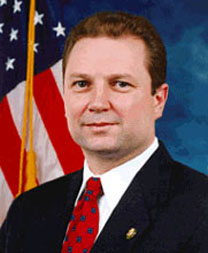

Member of the U.S. House of Representatives from Texas's 1st district
- In office January 3, 1997 – January 3, 2005
- Preceded by: Jim Chapman
- Succeeded by: Louie Gohmert

Personal details
- Born: Max Allen Sandlin Jr. September 29, 1952 (age 73) Texarkana, Arkansas, U.S.
- Party: Democratic
- Spouse(s): Leslie Howell (m. 1981; div. 2000) Stephanie Herseth (m. 2007)
- Education: Baylor University (BA, JD)

Max Allen Sandlin Jr. (born September 29, 1952) is an American politician who served eight years in the U.S. House of Representatives representing Texas's 1st congressional district from 1997 to 2005.

== Early life and career ==
The son of the former Margie Beth Barnett and her husband Maxwell Allen Sandlin, Max Sandlin is a graduate of Baylor University, where he was a member of Phi Delta Theta and named Outstanding Young Alumni, and Baylor University School of Law, where he was a member of the National Championship Mock Trial Team. He was the Distinguished Speaker for the John William Minton and Florence Dean Minton Endowed Law School Lecture Series at Law Day 2004 at Baylor Law School.

He practiced law in Texas and had a broad-based litigation and business practice. He was active in the banking and energy industries. He also served on the Board of Directors of East Texas Legal Services. He is a former County Judge and County Court at Law Judge.

== Congress ==
First elected to Congress in 1996, he rose to become a member of the senior House Democratic leadership, serving as Chief Deputy Whip. He served on the powerful and exclusive Ways and Means Committee, the Financial Services Committee, and the Transportation and Infrastructure Committee. He was an elected and later a leadership representative on the Democratic Steering and Policy Committee, and also among the small group of legislators selected for the Parliamentary Group, representatives called upon for rapid parliamentary and procedural action on the floor of the U.S. House.

Sandlin was a member of the Blue Dog Coalition and was Chairman of the Blue Dog Energy Task Force. Additionally, he served as Chairman of the Democratic Caucus Financial Services Task Force and was a member of the New Democrat Coalition.

While in the House, Sandlin was frequently asked to present and argue policy, and the Austin American-Statesman noted "Sandlin is a forceful and articulate speaker, a lawyer by trade who treats audiences like juries that can be charmed, coaxed, inspired and won over." The Paris Daily News noted that "Sandlin is highly polished...with God-given speaking talents" and an "...ability to communicate eloquently."

=== Consensus building ===
Sandlin was known as a consensus builder, and The Almanac of American Politics noted that he had a "...moderate voting record that straddles Democratic wings." The Democratic Caucus and leadership often called upon Sandlin's coalition-building skills and U.S. Rep. George Miller (D-CA) noted "We've always looked for a way to build that bridge [between liberals and centrists]. He [Sandlin] certainly has that talent." The Austin American-Statesman added that "Sandlin's a versatile campaigner, equally at home with Unitarians as he is in a roomful of good ol' boys."

=== Redistricting and defeat ===
Sandlin was a primary target of the Republican 2003 re-redistricting process orchestrated by then-House Majority Leader Tom DeLay (R-TX). Sandlin's district was made significantly more urban and Republican than its predecessor. Sandlin denounced the reconfiguring of his district, calling it an illegal and unconstitutional effort to dilute and eliminate the voices of rural and minority voters. Sandlin lost to former district judge Louie Gohmert in a massive landslide, taking only 39 percent of the vote. Three other members of the so-called "Texas Five" were also defeated after their districts were radically altered. No Democrat has garnered more than 35 percent of the vote since Sandlin left office.

== Private life ==
Sandlin is currently a partner and co-chairman of Mercury, a public strategy firm.

Sandlin is a former youth baseball, basketball, and softball coach. He is the father of five children, has three grandchildren, and is married to former U.S. Representative Stephanie Herseth Sandlin (D-SD), who is currently the president of Augustana University.

U.S. House of Representatives
Preceded by Jim Chapman	Member of the U.S. House of Representatives from Texas's 1st congressional district 1997–2005	Succeeded by Louie Gohmert
U.S. order of precedence (ceremonial)
Preceded by Ken Bentsen Jr. as Former U.S. Representative	Order of precedence of the United States as Former U.S. Representative	Succeeded by Jim Turner as Former U.S. Representative
