= 2003 United States House of Representatives elections =

- January 4, 2003 and June 3, 2003

2 of the 435 seats in the U.S. House of Representatives 218 seats needed for a majority
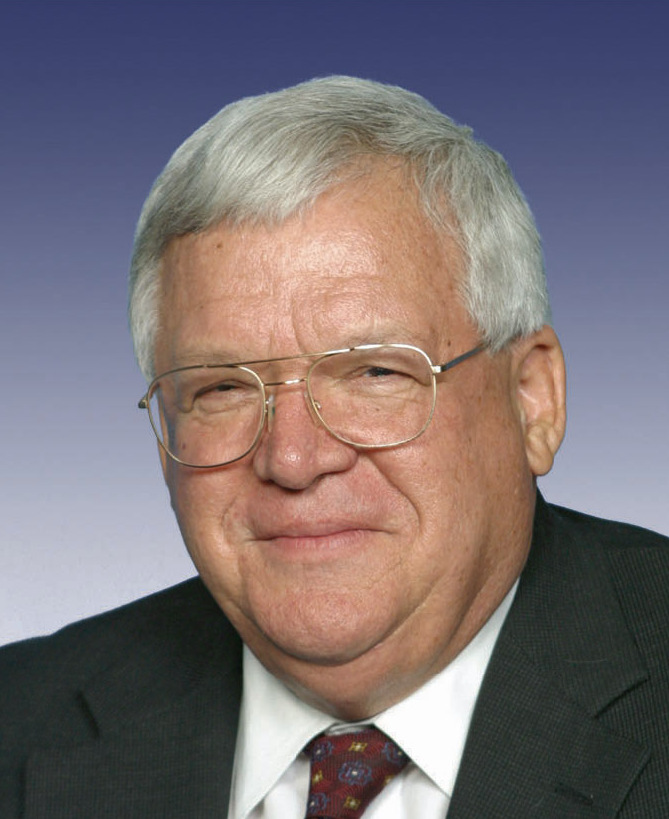

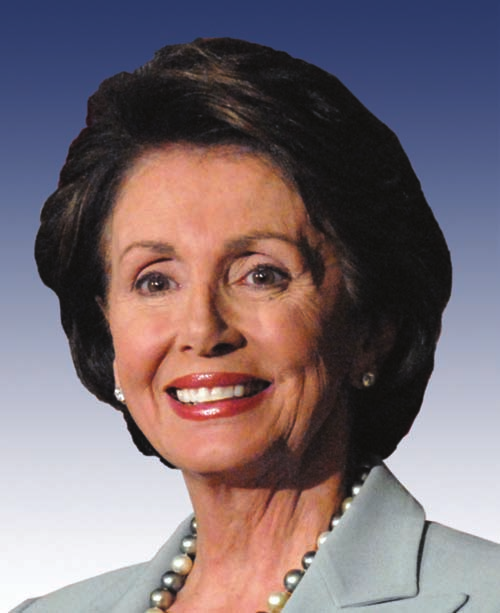
	Majority party	Minority party
Leader	Dennis Hastert	Nancy Pelosi
Party	Republican	Democratic
Leader since	January 3, 1999	January 3, 2003
Leader's seat	Illinois 14th	California 8th
Last election	229 seats	205 seats
Seats won	1	1
Seat change	Steady	Steady
Popular vote	124,373	64,636
Percentage	65.05%	33.81%
	Third party
Party	Independent
Last election	1 seats
Seats won	0
Seat change	Steady
Popular vote	81
Percentage	0.04%
Speaker before election
Dennis Hastert
Republican
Elected Speaker
Dennis Hastert
Republican

There were two special elections to the United States House of Representatives in 2003 during the 108th United States Congress.

== List of elections ==
Elections are listed by date and district.

District	Incumbent			This race	
District	Representative	Party	First elected	Results	Candidates
Hawaii 2	Ed Case	Democratic	2002 (Special)	Member-elect Patsy Mink (D) died September 28, 2002, but was posthumously elected to the 108th Congress. Ed Case had won a special election for the seat in the 107th Congress November 30, 2002, but not for the 108th Congress. Incumbent re-elected January 4, 2003.	▌ ✓ Ed Case (Democratic) 43.67%; ▌Matt Matsunaga (Democratic) 30.5%; ▌Colleen Hanabusa (Democratic) 8.00%; ▌Barbara Marumoto (Republican) 5.95%; ▌Bob C. McDermott (Republican) 5.69%; ▌Scattering <5%
Texas 19	Larry Combest	Republican	1984	Incumbent resigned May 31, 2003 for personal reasons. New member elected June 3, 2003, in a run-off vote. Republican hold.	▌ ✓ Randy Neugebauer (Republican) 50.52%; ▌Mike Conaway (Republican) 49.48%

== Hawaii's 2nd congressional district ==
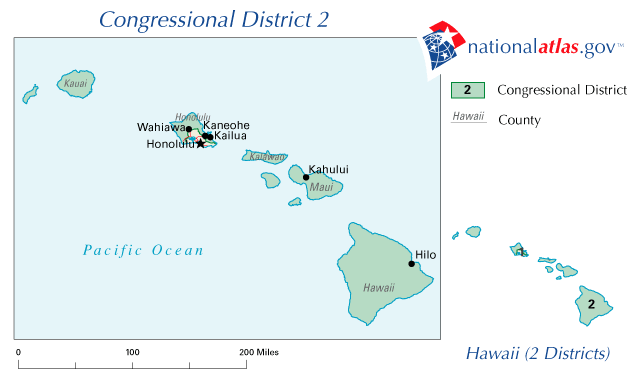
Hawaii's 2nd congressional district

Incumbent Democrat Patsy Mink died on September 28, 2002 due to viral pneumonia as a result of complications from chickenpox. By the time of her death, it had been too late to remove her from the general election ballot. Thus, on November 5, Mink was post-humously re-elected.

A special election was held on November 30, 2002 to fill out the remainder of her term, with Democrat Ed Case winning the election.

Another election, this time to for the 108th Congress was held on January 4, 2003 with incumbent Ed Case running for re-election, along with 3 dozen other candidates including Democratic state Senators Matt Matsunaga and Colleen Hanabusa, Republican state Representatives Barbara Marumoto and Bob McDermott, John Carroll, and former Mayor of Honolulu Frank Fasi.

Incumbent Ed Case won re-election with 44% of the vote.

2003 Hawaii's 2nd congressional district special election
Party	Candidate	Votes	%
Democratic	Ed Case (incumbent)	33,002	43.67
Democratic	Matt Matsunaga	23,050	30.50
Democratic	Colleen Hanabusa	6,046	8.00
Republican	Barbara Marumoto	4,497	5.95
Republican	Bob C. McDermott	4,298	5.69
Republican	Chris Halford	728	0.96
Republican	Kimo Kaloi	642	0.85
Republican	John S. Carroll	521	0.69
Republican	Frank Fasi	483	0.64
Nonpartisan	Mark McNett	449	0.59
Republican	Jim Rath	414	0.55
Republican	Richard Haake	212	0.28
Republican	Nelson Secretario	208	0.28
Republican	Whitney Anderson	201	0.27
Nonpartisan	Ron Jacobs	91	0.12
Green	Nick Nikhilananda	75	0.10
Democratic	Brian G. Cole	69	0.09
Democratic	Kekoa David Kaapu	68	0.09
Libertarian	Jeff Mallan	58	0.08
Nonpartisan	Sophie Mataafa	52	0.07
Republican	Doug Fairhurst	38	0.05
Democratic	Michael Gagne	35	0.05
Republican	Carolyn Martinez Golojuch	29	0.04
Green	Gregory Goodwin	27	0.04
Republican	Rich Payne	25	0.03
Republican	Clarence Weatherwax	25	0.03
Nonpartisan	Kabba Anand	24	0.03
Nonpartisan	Dan Vierra	22	0.03
Republican	John Sabey	20	0.03
Democratic	Pat Rocco	19	0.03
Nonpartisan	Bill Russell	18	0.02
Nonpartisan	Steve Sparks	17	0.02
Nonpartisan	Solomon Wong	16	0.02
Democratic	Art Reyes	15	0.02
Democratic	Paul Britos	13	0.02
Nonpartisan	S.J. Harlan	11	0.01
Democratic	Charles Collins	10	0.01
Nonpartisan	Jack Randall	9	0.01
Democratic	Steve Tataii	9	0.01
Nonpartisan	Marshall Turner	8	0.01
Republican	Mike Rethman	8	0.01
Democratic	Herbert Jensen	6	0.01
Nonpartisan	Alan Gano	3	0.01
Nonpartisan	Bartle Rowland	3	0.01
Total votes		76,328	100.00
Democratic hold			

== Texas's 19th congressional district ==
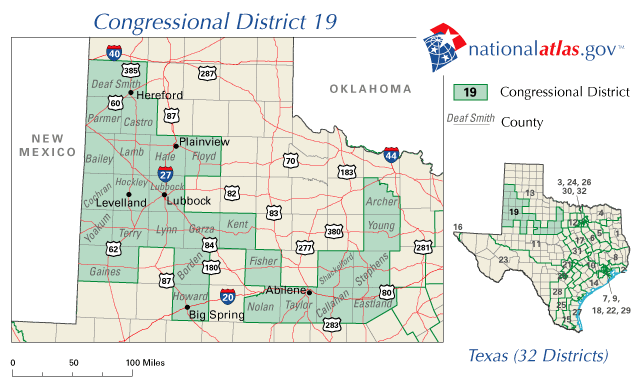
Texas's 19th congressional district

Incumbent Republican Larry Combest announced his resignation on November 12, 2002 following the deaths of his father and one of his daughters, and officially resigned on May 31, 2003.

A nonpartisan special primary was held on May 3, 2003.

2003 Texas 19th special primary
Party	Candidate	Votes	%
Republican	Randy Neugebauer	13,091	22.42
Republican	Mike Conaway	12,270	21.02
Republican	Carl Isett	11,015	18.87
Republican	David Langston	8,053	13.79
Republican	Stace Williams	2,609	4.46
Republican	Vickie Sutton	1,987	3.40
Republican	Jamie Berryhill Jr.	1,907	3.26
Republican	John D. Bell	1,883	3.22
Democratic	Kaye Gaddy	1,396	2.39
Republican	Richard Bartlett	1,046	1.79
Republican	Bill Christian	1,029	1.76
Democratic	Jerri Simmons-Asmussen	898	1.53
Republican	Donald May	629	1.07
Green	Julia Penelope	223	0.38
Libertarian	Chip Peterson	159	0.27
Constitution	Thomas Flournoy	93	0.15
Independent	Ed Hicks	81	0.13
Total votes		58,369	100

As no candidates received over 50% of the vote, the two candidates with the most votes, Randy Neugebauer and Mike Conaway moved to a run-off held on June 3. Neugebauer narrowly won the election, with 50.52% of the vote.

2003 Texas's 19th congressional district special election
Party	Candidate	Votes	%
Republican	Randy Neugebauer	28,546	50.52
Republican	Mike Conaway	27,959	49.48
Total votes		56,505	100.00
Republican hold			

== See also ==
- List of special elections to the United States House of Representatives
