= 108th United States Congress =

2003–2005 U.S. legislative term

←	107th	109th	→
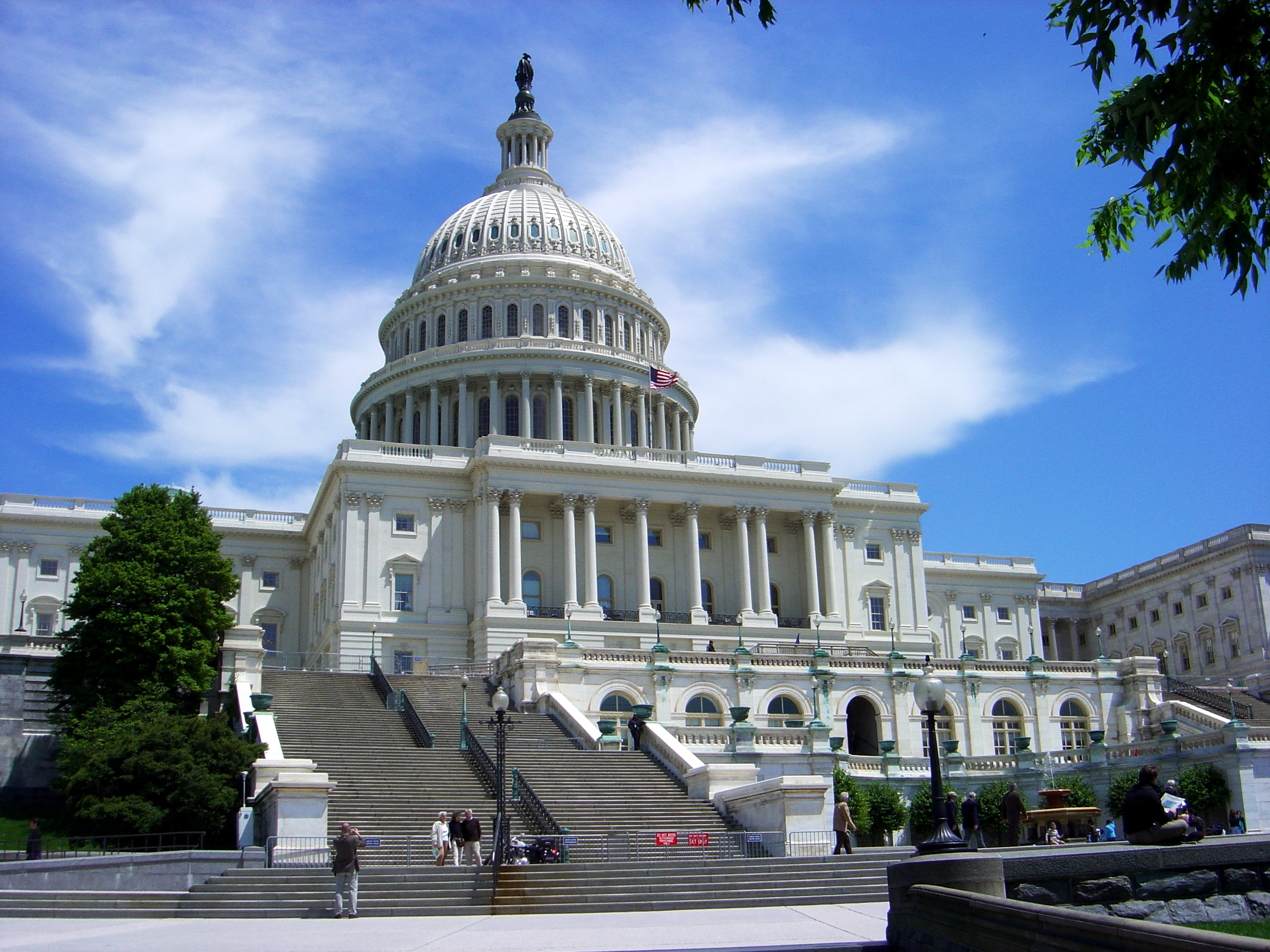
- United States Capitol (2004)

Overview
- Legislative body: United States Congress
- Jurisdiction: United States
- Term: January 3, 2003 – January 3, 2005

Senate
- Members: 100
- President: Dick Cheney (R)
- President pro tempore: Ted Stevens (R)
- Party control: Republican

House of Representatives
- Members: 435 representatives 5 non-voting delegates
- Speaker: Dennis Hastert (R)
- Party control: Republican

Sessions
- 1st: January 7, 2003 – December 8, 2003
- 2nd: January 20, 2004 – December 9, 2004

The 108th United States Congress was a meeting of the legislative branch of the United States federal government, composed of the United States Senate and the United States House of Representatives from January 3, 2003, to January 3, 2005, during the third and fourth years of George W. Bush's presidency.

House members were elected in the 2002 general election on November 5, 2002. Senators were elected in three classes in the 1998 general election on November 3, 1998, 2000 general election on November 7, 2000, or 2002 general election on November 5, 2002. The apportionment of seats in the House of Representatives was based on the 2000 United States census.

This is the most recent Congress to have a Democratic senator from South Carolina, Fritz Hollings, who retired at the end of the Congress.

Both chambers had a Republican majority, with the Republicans slightly increasing their edge in the House, and regaining control of the Senate, after party control had switched back and forth during the 107th Congress due to various factors. With President Bush, this gave the Republicans an overall federal government trifecta.

== Major events ==
- February 1, 2003: Space Shuttle Columbia disintegrated during reentry
- March 20, 2003: 2003 invasion of Iraq began
- April 14, 2003: Human Genome Project was completed
- July 14, 2003: CIA leak scandal began
- May 17, 2004: Same-sex marriage began in Massachusetts
- July 22, 2004: 9/11 Commission issued an initial report of its findings
- September 13, 2004: expiration of the Federal Assault Weapons Ban
- November 2, 2004:
  - 2004 United States presidential election: George W. Bush defeated Democratic challenger, Senator John Kerry from Massachusetts.
  - United States Senate elections, 2004 & United States House of Representatives elections, 2004: Republicans increased their majorities in both houses.

== Major legislation ==
=== Enacted ===
- March 11, 2003: Do-Not-Call Implementation Act of 2003, Pub. L. 108–10 (text) (PDF)
- April 25, 2003: Clean Diamond Trade Act, Pub.L. 108-19
- April 30, 2003: PROTECT (Prosecutorial Remedies and Other Tools to end the Exploitation of Children Today) Act, including Illicit Drug Anti-Proliferation Act, Pub. L. 108–21 (text) (PDF)
- May 27, 2003: United States Leadership Against HIV/AIDS, Tuberculosis, and Malaria Act of 2003, Pub.L. 108-25
- May 28, 2003: Jobs and Growth Tax Relief Reconciliation Act of 2003, Pub. L. 108–27 (text) (PDF)
- May 29, 2003: Veterans' Memorial Preservation and Recognition Act of 2003, Pub.L. 108-29
- June 25, 2003: Keeping Children and Families Safe Act of 2003, Pub.L. 108-36
- September 4, 2003: Prison Rape Elimination Act of 2003, Pub. L. 108–79 (text) (PDF)
- October 1, 2003: Department of Homeland Security Appropriations Act, 2004, Pub.L. 108-90
- October 28, 2003: Check 21 Act, Pub. L. 108–100 (text) (PDF)
- November 5, 2003: Partial-Birth Abortion Ban Act, Pub. L. 108–105 (text) (PDF)
- December 3, 2003: Healthy Forests Restoration Act of 2003, Pub.L. 108-148
- December 3, 2003: 21st Century Nanotechnology Research and Development Act, Pub.L. 108-153
- December 4, 2003: Fair and Accurate Credit Transactions Act, Pub. L. 108–159 (text) (PDF)
- December 6, 2003: Fairness to Contact Lens Consumers Act, Pub.L. 108-164
- December 8, 2003: Medicare Prescription Drug, Improvement, and Modernization Act, Pub. L. 108–173 (text) (PDF)
- December 12, 2003:Syria Accountability and Lebanese Sovereignty Restoration Act, Pub. L. 108–175 (text) (PDF)
- December 16, 2003: CAN-SPAM Act, Pub. L. 108–187 (text) (PDF)
- March 25, 2004: Unborn Victims of Violence Act (Laci and Conner's Law), Pub. L. 108–212 (text) (PDF)
- June 30, 2004: Bunning-Bereuter-Blumenauer Flood Insurance Reform Act, Pub. L. 108–264 (text) (PDF)
- July 7, 2004: GAO Human Capital Reform Act of 2004, Pub. L. 108–271 (text) (PDF)
- July 21, 2004: Project BioShield Act of 2004, Pub. L. 108–276 (text) (PDF)
- October 18, 2004: North Korean Human Rights Act of 2004, Pub. L. 108–333 (text) (PDF)
- October 18, 2004: Department of Homeland Security Appropriations Act, 2005, Pub.L. 108-334
- October 20, 2004: Belarus Democracy Act of 2004, Pub. L. 108–347 (text) (PDF)
- October 22, 2004: American Jobs Creation Act of 2004, Pub.L. 108-357
- October 30, 2004: Crime Victims' Rights Act, Pub.L. 108-405
- December 3, 2004: Internet Tax Nondiscrimination Act, Pub.L. 108-435
- December 3, 2004: Individuals with Disabilities Education Improvement Act of 2004, Pub.L. 108-446
- December 8, 2004: Consolidated Appropriations Act, 2005, Pub.L. 108-447
- December 10, 2004: Alaska Land Transfer Acceleration Act, Pub.L. 108-452
- December 17, 2004: Intelligence Reform and Terrorism Prevention Act, Pub. L. 108–458 (text) (PDF)

=== Proposed, but not enacted ===
- H.R. 2239: Voter Confidence and Increased Accessibility Act of 2003

== Party summary ==
=== Senate ===
Party standings in the 108th Congress 48 Democratic senators 1 independent senator, caucusing with Democrats 51 Republican senators

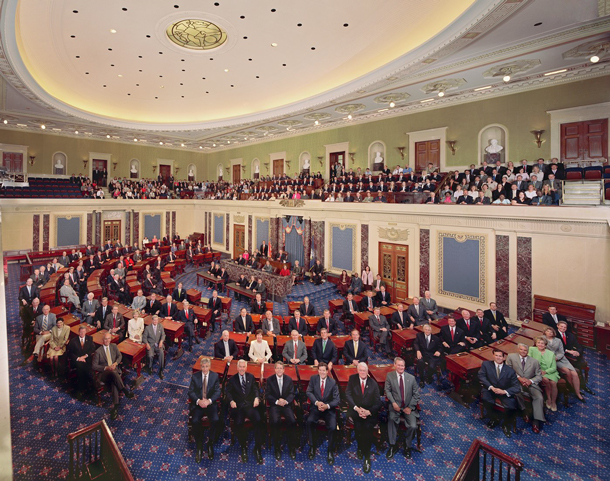
U.S. Senate in the Senate Chamber (2003)

The party summary for the Senate remained the same during the entire 108th Congress.

Affiliation	Party (Shading indicates majority caucus)				Total	
Affiliation	Democratic	Independent	IPM	Republican	Total	Vacant
End of previous Congress	48	1	1	50	100	0
108th Congress	48	1	0	51	100	0
Beginning of next Congress	44	1	0	55	100	0

=== House of Representatives ===
Due to resignations and special elections, Republicans lost a net of two seats to the Democrats. All seats were filled though special elections. (See Changes in membership, below.)

Affiliation	Party (Shading indicates majority caucus)			Total	
Affiliation	Democratic	Independent	Republican	Total	Vacant
End of previous Congress	209	1	223	433	2
Begin	204	1	229	434	1
May 31, 2003	204	1	228	434	1
June 5, 2003	205	1	229	435	0
December 9, 2003	205	1	228	434	1
January 20, 2004	205	1	227	433	2
February 17, 2004	205	1	228	434	1
June 1, 2004	207	1	228	435	0
June 9, 2004	206	1	228	434	1
July 20, 2004	206	1	229	435	0
August 31, 2004	205	1	228	434	1
September 23, 2004	204	1	227	432	3
Final voting share	48.0%		52.0%		
Non-voting members	4	0	1	5	0
Beginning of next Congress	201	1	232	434	1

== Leadership ==
=== Senate ===
Senate President

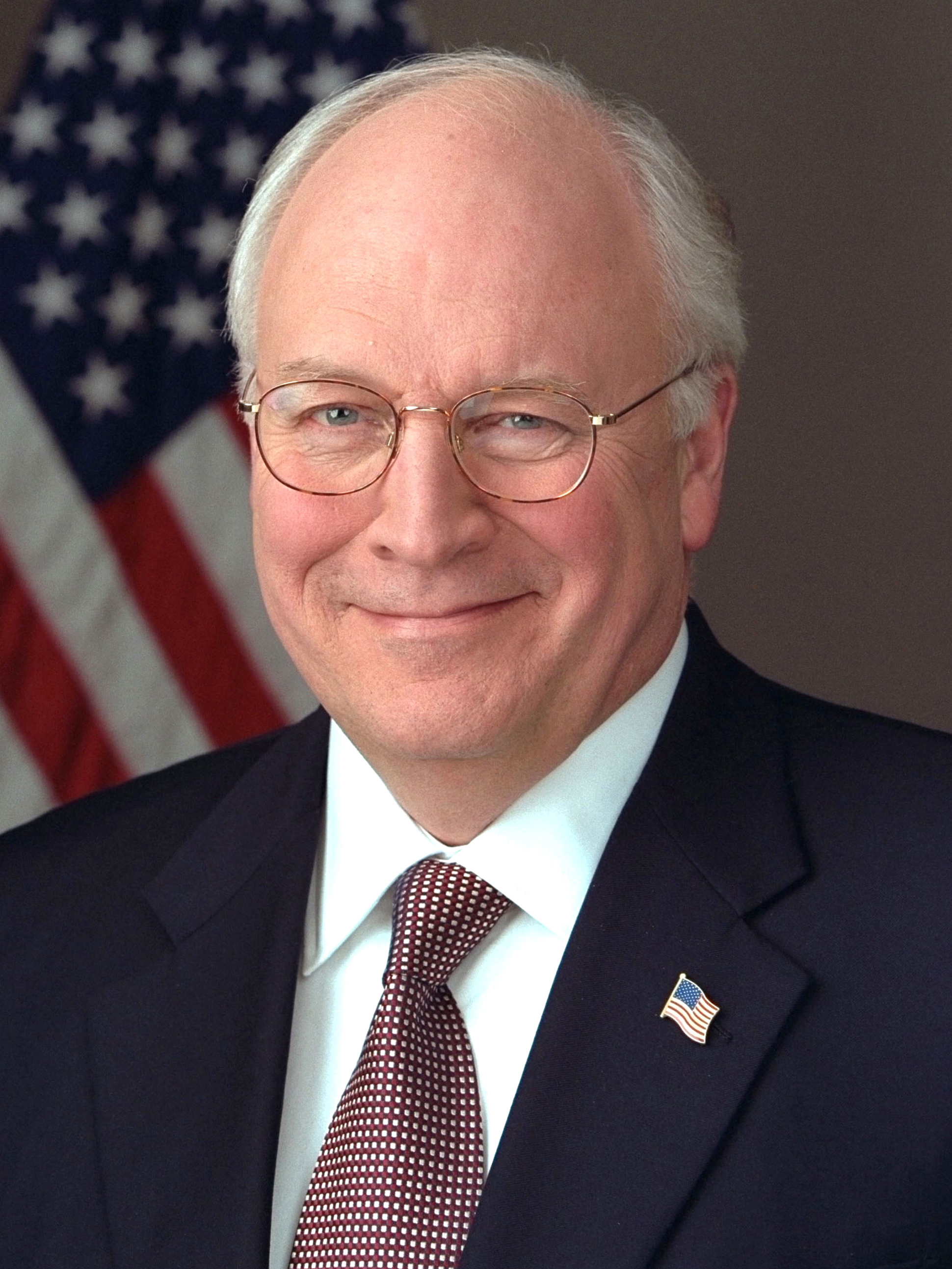
Dick Cheney (R)

Senate President pro tempore

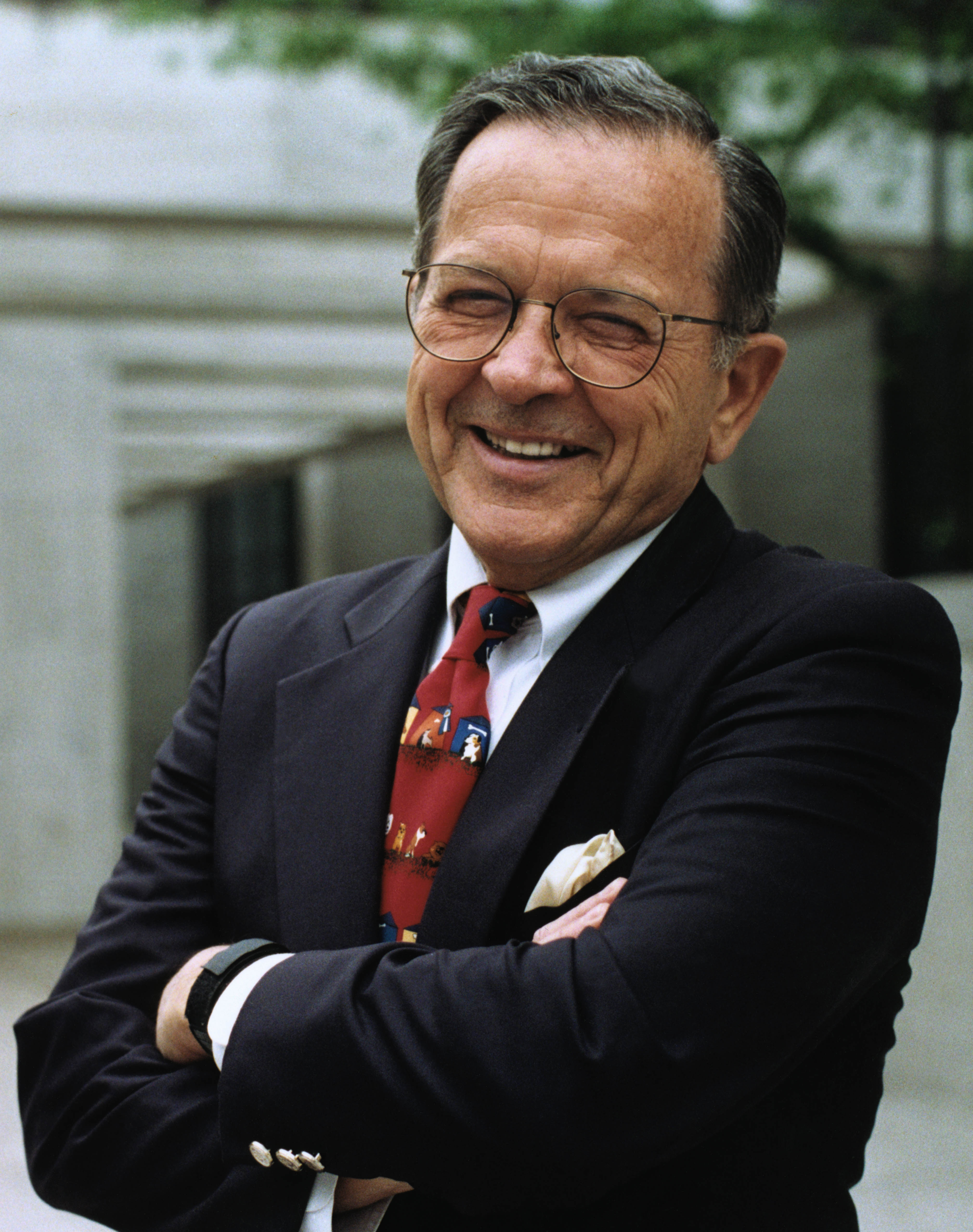
Ted Stevens (R)

- President: Dick Cheney (R)
- President pro tempore: Ted Stevens (R)

==== Majority (Republican) leadership ====
- Majority Leader: Bill Frist
- Majority Whip: Mitch McConnell
- Republican Conference Chairman: Rick Santorum
- Republican Conference Secretary: Kay Bailey Hutchison
- Republican Campaign Committee Chairman: George Allen
- Policy Committee Chairman: Jon Kyl
- Chief Deputy Whip: Bob Bennett

==== Minority (Democratic) leadership ====
- Minority Leader: Tom Daschle
- Minority Whip: Harry Reid
- Policy Committee Chairman: Byron Dorgan
- Democratic Conference Secretary: Barbara Mikulski
- Democratic Campaign Committee Chairman: Jon Corzine
- Steering and Outreach Committee Chair: Hillary Clinton
- Chief Deputy Whip: John Breaux

=== House of Representatives ===
Speaker of the House

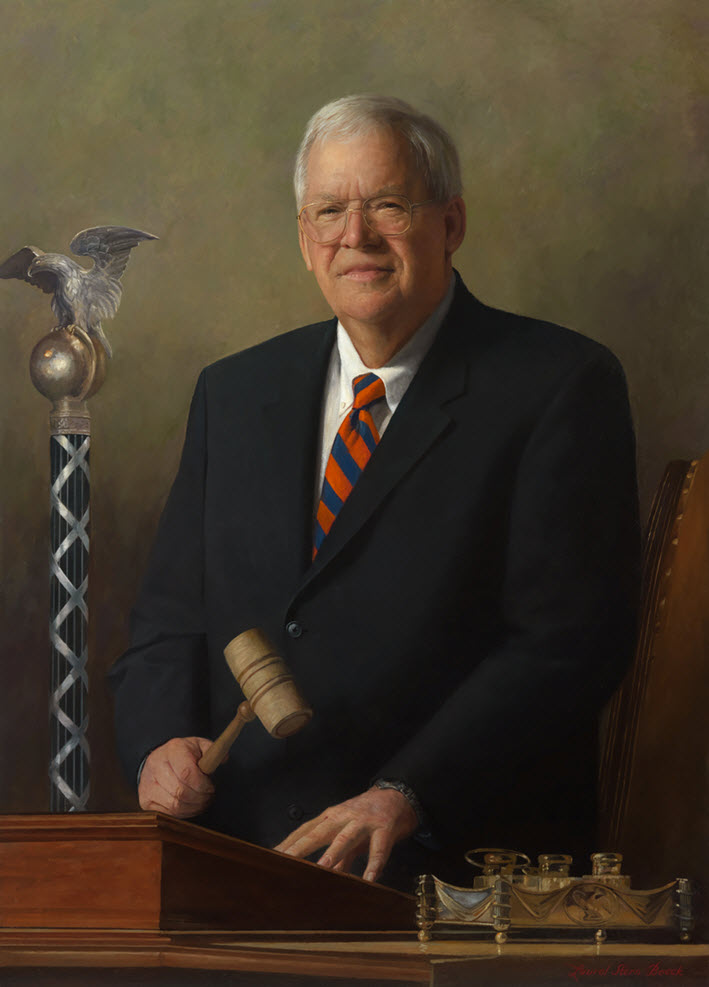
Dennis Hastert (R)

- Speaker: Dennis Hastert (R)

==== Majority (Republican) leadership ====
- Majority Leader: Tom DeLay
- Majority Whip: Roy Blunt
- Chief Deputy Whip: Eric Cantor
- Republican Conference Chairman: Deborah Pryce
- Republican Conference Vice-Chairman: Jack Kingston
- Republican Conference Secretary: John T. Doolittle
- Policy Committee Chairman: Christopher Cox
- Republican Campaign Committee Chairman: Tom Reynolds
- House Rules Committee Chairman: David Dreier

==== Minority (Democratic) leadership ====
- Minority Leader: Nancy Pelosi
- Minority Whip: Steny Hoyer
- Senior Chief Deputy Minority Whip: John Lewis
- Democratic Caucus Chairman: Bob Menendez
- Democratic Caucus Vice Chairman: Jim Clyburn
- Democratic Campaign Committee Chairman: Bob Matsui
- Chief Deputy Minority Whips: Joe Crowley, Baron Hill, Ron Kind, Ed Pastor, Max Sandlin, Jan Schakowsky, & Maxine Waters

== Members ==
=== Senate ===
Senators are preceded by the class, In this Congress, Class 3 meant their term ended with this Congress, requiring reelection in 2004; Class 1 meant their term began in the last Congress, requiring reelection in 2006; and Class 2 meant their term began in this Congress, requiring reelection in 2008.

==== Alabama ====
▌2. Jeff Sessions (R)
▌3. Richard Shelby (R)

==== Alaska ====
▌2. Ted Stevens (R)
▌3. Lisa Murkowski (R)

==== Arizona ====
▌1. Jon Kyl (R)
▌3. John McCain (R)

==== Arkansas ====
▌2. Mark Pryor (D)
▌3. Blanche Lincoln (D)

==== California ====
▌1. Dianne Feinstein (D)
▌3. Barbara Boxer (D)

==== Colorado ====
▌2. Wayne Allard (R)
▌3. Ben Nighthorse Campbell (R)

==== Connecticut ====
▌1. Joe Lieberman (D)
▌3. Chris Dodd (D)

==== Delaware ====
▌1. Tom Carper (D)
▌2. Joe Biden (D)

==== Florida ====
▌1. Bill Nelson (D)
▌3. Bob Graham (D)

==== Georgia ====
▌2. Saxby Chambliss (R)
▌3. Zell Miller (D)

==== Hawaii ====
▌1. Daniel Akaka (D)
▌3. Daniel Inouye (D)

==== Idaho ====
▌2. Larry Craig (R)
▌3. Mike Crapo (R)

==== Illinois ====
▌2. Dick Durbin (D)
▌3. Peter Fitzgerald (R)

==== Indiana ====
▌1. Richard Lugar (R)
▌3. Evan Bayh (D)

==== Iowa ====
▌2. Tom Harkin (D)
▌3. Chuck Grassley (R)

==== Kansas ====
▌2. Pat Roberts (R)
▌3. Sam Brownback (R)

==== Kentucky ====
▌2. Mitch McConnell (R)
▌3. Jim Bunning (R)

==== Louisiana ====
▌2. Mary Landrieu (D)
▌3. John Breaux (D)

==== Maine ====
▌1. Olympia Snowe (R)
▌2. Susan Collins (R)

==== Maryland ====
▌1. Paul Sarbanes (D)
▌3. Barbara Mikulski (D)

==== Massachusetts ====
▌1. Ted Kennedy (D)
▌2. John Kerry (D)

==== Michigan ====
▌1. Debbie Stabenow (D)
▌2. Carl Levin (D)

==== Minnesota ====
▌1. Mark Dayton (DFL)
▌2. Norm Coleman (R)

==== Mississippi ====
▌1. Trent Lott (R)
▌2. Thad Cochran (R)

==== Missouri ====
▌1. James Talent (R)
▌3. Kit Bond (R)

==== Montana ====
▌1. Conrad Burns (R)
▌2. Max Baucus (D)

==== Nebraska ====
▌1. Ben Nelson (D)
▌2. Chuck Hagel (R)

==== Nevada ====
▌1. John Ensign (R)
▌3. Harry Reid (D)

==== New Hampshire ====
▌2. John E. Sununu (R)
▌3. Judd Gregg (R)

==== New Jersey ====
▌1. Jon Corzine (D)
▌2. Frank Lautenberg (D)

==== New Mexico ====
▌1. Jeff Bingaman (D)
▌2. Pete Domenici (R)

==== New York ====
▌1. Hillary Clinton (D)
▌3. Chuck Schumer (D)

==== North Carolina ====
▌2. Elizabeth Dole (R)
▌3. John Edwards (D)

==== North Dakota ====
▌1. Kent Conrad (D-NPL)
▌3. Byron Dorgan (D-NPL)

==== Ohio ====
▌1. Mike DeWine (R)
▌3. George Voinovich (R)

==== Oklahoma ====
▌2. Jim Inhofe (R)
▌3. Don Nickles (R)

==== Oregon ====
▌2. Gordon H. Smith (R)
▌3. Ron Wyden (D)

==== Pennsylvania ====
▌1. Rick Santorum (R)
▌3. Arlen Specter (R)

==== Rhode Island ====
▌1. Lincoln Chafee (R)
▌2. Jack Reed (D)

==== South Carolina ====
▌2. Lindsey Graham (R)
▌3. Fritz Hollings (D)

==== South Dakota ====
▌2. Tim Johnson (D)
▌3. Tom Daschle (D)

==== Tennessee ====
▌1. Bill Frist (R)
▌2. Lamar Alexander (R)

==== Texas ====
▌1. Kay Bailey Hutchison (R)
▌2. John Cornyn (R)

==== Utah ====
▌1. Orrin Hatch (R)
▌3. Bob Bennett (R)

==== Vermont ====
▌1. Jim Jeffords (I)
▌3. Patrick Leahy (D)

==== Virginia ====
▌1. George Allen (R)
▌2. John Warner (R)

==== Washington ====
▌1. Maria Cantwell (D)
▌3. Patty Murray (D)

==== West Virginia ====
▌1. Robert Byrd (D)
▌2. Jay Rockefeller (D)

==== Wisconsin ====
▌1. Herb Kohl (D)
▌3. Russ Feingold (D)

==== Wyoming ====
▌1. Craig L. Thomas (R)
▌2. Mike Enzi (R)

Senators' party membership by state at the opening of the 108th Congress in January 2003 2 Democrats 1 Democrat and 1 Republican 2 Republicans 1 Independent and 1 Democrat

Senate majority leadership

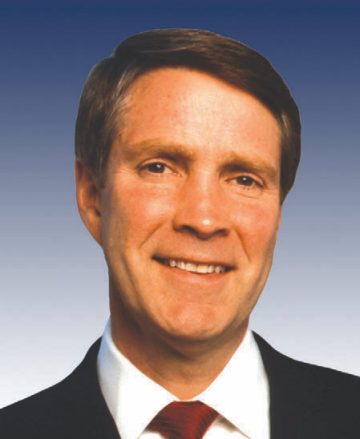
Republican leader
Bill Frist

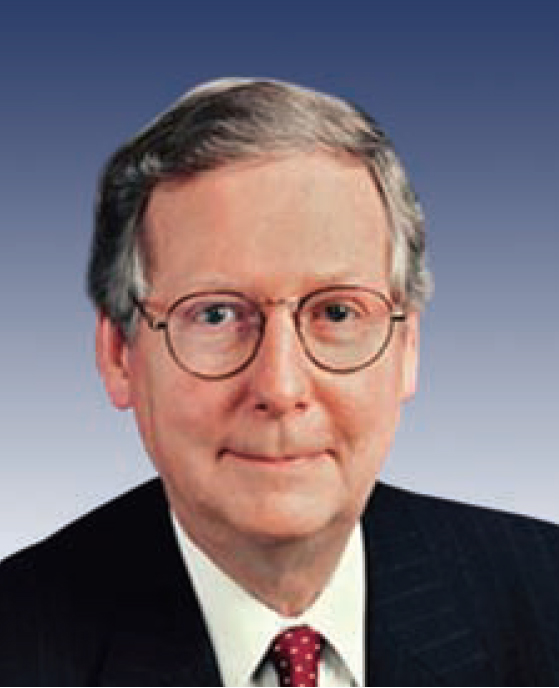
Republican whip
Mitch McConnell

Senate minority leadership

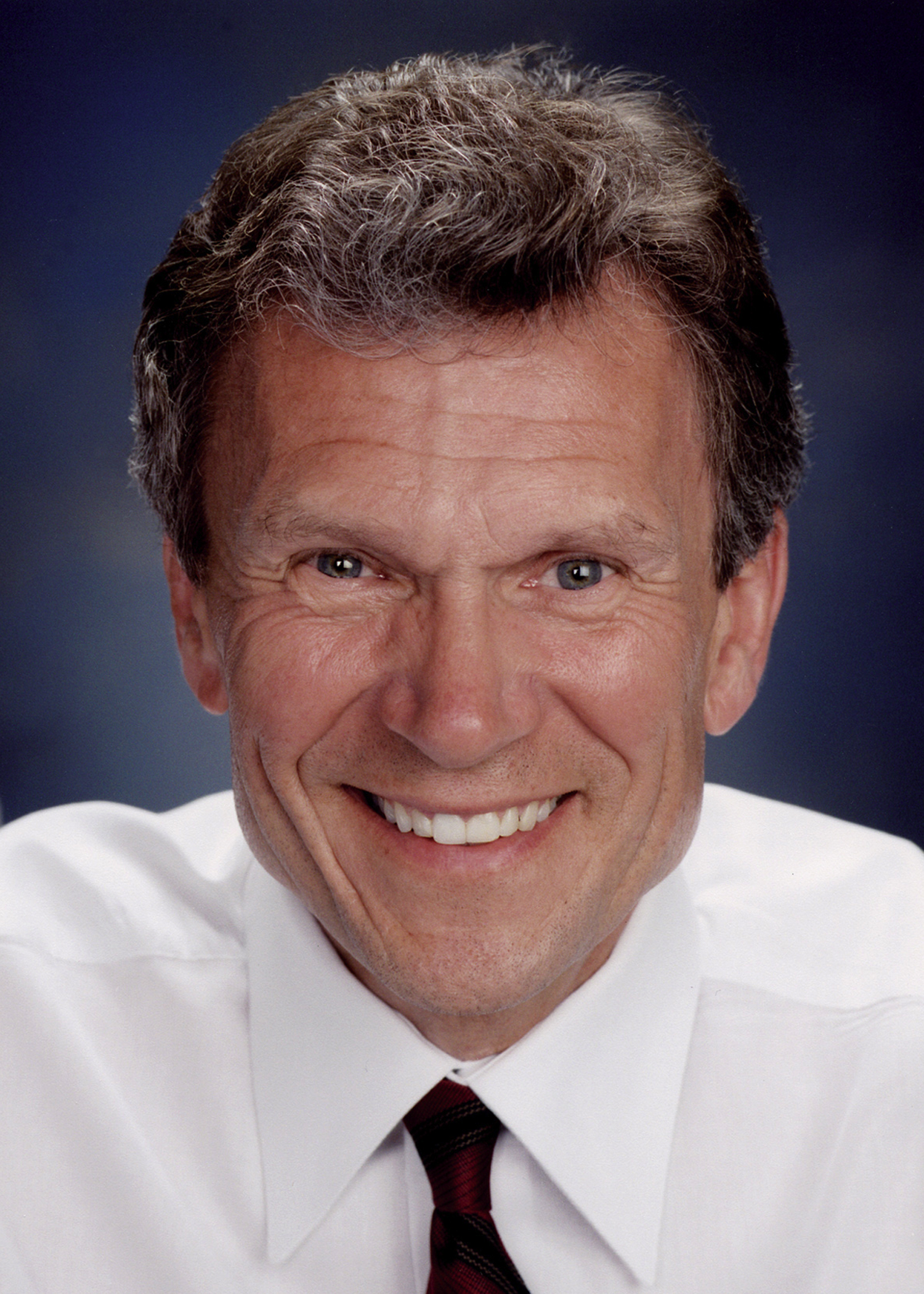
Democratic leader
Tom Daschle

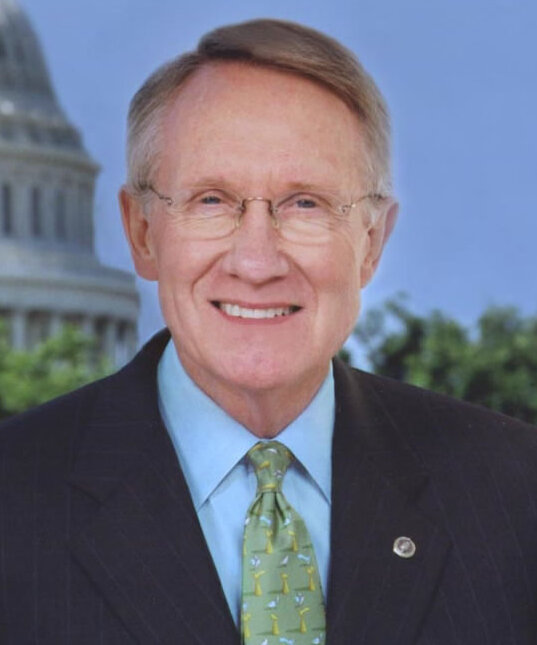
Democratic whip
Harry Reid

Representatives party membership by state at the opening of the 108th Congress. The gold coloring of Vermont indicates Rep. Bernie Sanders, an independent.

=== House of Representatives ===
Representatives are preceded by the district number.

==== Alabama ====
▌1. Jo Bonner (R)
▌2. Terry Everett (R)
▌3. Mike Rogers (R)
▌4. Robert Aderholt (R)
▌5. Bud Cramer (D)
▌6. Spencer Bachus (R)
▌7. Artur Davis (D)

==== Alaska ====
▌At-large. Don Young (R)

==== Arizona ====
▌1. Rick Renzi (R)
▌2. Trent Franks (R)
▌3. John Shadegg (R)
▌4. Ed Pastor (D)
▌5. J. D. Hayworth (R)
▌6. Jeff Flake (R)
▌7. Raúl Grijalva (D)
▌8. Jim Kolbe (R)

==== Arkansas ====
▌1. Marion Berry (D)
▌2. Vic Snyder (D)
▌3. John Boozman (R)
▌4. Mike Ross (D)

==== California ====
▌1. Mike Thompson (D)
▌2. Wally Herger (R)
▌3. Doug Ose (R)
▌4. John Doolittle (R)
▌5. Robert Matsui (D), until January 1, 2005, vacant thereafter
▌6. Lynn Woolsey (D)
▌7. George Miller (D)
▌8. Nancy Pelosi (D)
▌9. Barbara Lee (D)
▌10. Ellen Tauscher (D)
▌11. Richard Pombo (R)
▌12. Tom Lantos (D)
▌13. Pete Stark (D)
▌14. Anna Eshoo (D)
▌15. Mike Honda (D)
▌16. Zoe Lofgren (D)
▌17. Sam Farr (D)
▌18. Dennis Cardoza (D)
▌19. George Radanovich (R)
▌20. Cal Dooley (D)
▌21. Devin Nunes (R)
▌22. Bill Thomas (R)
▌23. Lois Capps (D)
▌24. Elton Gallegly (R)
▌25. Howard McKeon (R)
▌26. David Dreier (R)
▌27. Brad Sherman (D)
▌28. Howard Berman (D)
▌29. Adam Schiff (D)
▌30. Henry Waxman (D)
▌31. Xavier Becerra (D)
▌32. Hilda Solis (D)
▌33. Diane Watson (D)
▌34. Lucille Roybal-Allard (D)
▌35. Maxine Waters (D)
▌36. Jane Harman (D)
▌37. Juanita Millender-McDonald (D)
▌38. Grace Napolitano (D)
▌39. Linda Sánchez (D)
▌40. Edward R. Royce (R)
▌41. Jerry Lewis (R)
▌42. Gary Miller (R)
▌43. Joe Baca (D)
▌44. Ken Calvert (R)
▌45. Mary Bono (R)
▌46. Dana Rohrabacher (R)
▌47. Loretta Sanchez (D)
▌48. Christopher Cox (R)
▌49. Darrell Issa (R)
▌50. Duke Cunningham (R)
▌51. Bob Filner (D)
▌52. Duncan Hunter (R)
▌53. Susan Davis (D)

==== Colorado ====
▌1. Diana DeGette (D)
▌2. Mark Udall (D)
▌3. Scott McInnis (R)
▌4. Marilyn Musgrave (R)
▌5. Joel Hefley (R)
▌6. Tom Tancredo (R)
▌7. Bob Beauprez (R)

==== Connecticut ====
▌1. John Larson (D)
▌2. Rob Simmons (R)
▌3. Rosa DeLauro (D)
▌4. Chris Shays (R)
▌5. Nancy Johnson (R)

==== Delaware ====
▌At-large. Mike Castle (R)

==== Florida ====
▌1. Jeff Miller (R)
▌2. Allen Boyd (D)
▌3. Corrine Brown (D)
▌4. Ander Crenshaw (R)
▌5. Ginny Brown-Waite (R)
▌6. Cliff Stearns (R)
▌7. John Mica (R)
▌8. Ric Keller (R)
▌9. Michael Bilirakis (R)
▌10. Bill Young (R)
▌11. Jim Davis (D)
▌12. Adam Putnam (R)
▌13. Katherine Harris (R)
▌14. Porter Goss (R), until September 24, 2004, vacant thereafter
▌15. Dave Weldon (R)
▌16. Mark Foley (R)
▌17. Kendrick Meek (D)
▌18. Ileana Ros-Lehtinen (R)
▌19. Robert Wexler (D)
▌20. Peter Deutsch (D)
▌21. Lincoln Diaz-Balart (R)
▌22. Clay Shaw (R)
▌23. Alcee Hastings (D)
▌24. Tom Feeney (R)
▌25. Mario Diaz-Balart (R)

==== Georgia ====
▌1. Jack Kingston (R)
▌2. Sanford Bishop (D)
▌3. Jim Marshall (D)
▌4. Denise Majette (D)
▌5. John Lewis (D)
▌6. Johnny Isakson (R)
▌7. John Linder (R)
▌8. Mac Collins (R)
▌9. Charlie Norwood (R)
▌10. Nathan Deal (R)
▌11. Phil Gingrey (R)
▌12. Max Burns (R)
▌13. David Scott (D)

==== Hawaii ====
▌1. Neil Abercrombie (D)
▌2. Ed Case (D), from January 4, 2003

==== Idaho ====
▌1. Butch Otter (R)
▌2. Mike Simpson (R)

==== Illinois ====
▌1. Bobby Rush (D)
▌2. Jesse Jackson Jr. (D)
▌3. William Lipinski (D)
▌4. Luis Gutiérrez (D)
▌5. Rahm Emanuel (D)
▌6. Henry Hyde (R)
▌7. Danny Davis (D)
▌8. Philip Crane (R)
▌9. Janice Schakowsky (D)
▌10. Mark Kirk (R)
▌11. Jerry Weller (R)
▌12. Jerry Costello (D)
▌13. Judy Biggert (R)
▌14. Dennis Hastert (R)
▌15. Tim Johnson (R)
▌16. Donald Manzullo (R)
▌17. Lane Evans (D)
▌18. Ray LaHood (R)
▌19. John Shimkus (R)

==== Indiana ====
▌1. Pete Visclosky (D)
▌2. Chris Chocola (R)
▌3. Mark Souder (R)
▌4. Steve Buyer (R)
▌5. Dan Burton (R)
▌6. Mike Pence (R)
▌7. Julia Carson (D)
▌8. John Hostettler (R)
▌9. Baron Hill (D)

==== Iowa ====
▌1. Jim Nussle (R)
▌2. Jim Leach (R)
▌3. Leonard Boswell (D)
▌4. Tom Latham (R)
▌5. Steve King (R)

==== Kansas ====
▌1. Jerry Moran (R)
▌2. Jim Ryun (R)
▌3. Dennis Moore (D)
▌4. Todd Tiahrt (R)

==== Kentucky ====
▌1. Ed Whitfield (R)
▌2. Ron Lewis (R)
▌3. Anne Northup (R)
▌4. Ken Lucas (D)
▌5. Hal Rogers (R)
▌6. Ernie Fletcher (R), until December 9, 2003

▌Ben Chandler (D), from February 7, 2004

==== Louisiana ====
▌1. David Vitter (R)
▌2. William Jefferson (D)
▌3. Billy Tauzin (R)
▌4. Jim McCrery (R)
▌▌5. Rodney Alexander (D, then R)
▌6. Richard Baker (R)
▌7. Christopher John (D)

==== Maine ====
▌1. Tom Allen (D)
▌2. Mike Michaud (D)

==== Maryland ====
▌1. Wayne Gilchrest (R)
▌2. Dutch Ruppersberger (D)
▌3. Ben Cardin (D)
▌4. Albert Wynn (D)
▌5. Steny Hoyer (D)
▌6. Roscoe Bartlett (R)
▌7. Elijah Cummings (D)
▌8. Chris Van Hollen (D)

==== Massachusetts ====
▌1. John Olver (D)
▌2. Richard Neal (D)
▌3. Jim McGovern (D)
▌4. Barney Frank (D)
▌5. Marty Meehan (D)
▌6. John Tierney (D)
▌7. Ed Markey (D)
▌8. Mike Capuano (D)
▌9. Stephen Lynch (D)
▌10. Bill Delahunt (D)

==== Michigan ====
▌1. Bart Stupak (D)
▌2. Peter Hoekstra (R)
▌3. Vern Ehlers (R)
▌4. David Lee Camp (R)
▌5. Dale Kildee (D)
▌6. Fred Upton (R)
▌7. Nick Smith (R)
▌8. Mike Rogers (R)
▌9. Joe Knollenberg (R)
▌10. Candice Miller (R)
▌11. Thaddeus McCotter (R)
▌12. Sander Levin (D)
▌13. Carolyn Cheeks Kilpatrick (D)
▌14. John Conyers (D)
▌15. John Dingell (D)

==== Minnesota ====
▌1. Gil Gutknecht (R)
▌2. John Kline (R)
▌3. Jim Ramstad (R)
▌4. Betty McCollum (DFL)
▌5. Martin Olav Sabo (DFL)
▌6. Mark Kennedy (R)
▌7. Collin Peterson (DFL)
▌8. James Oberstar (DFL)

==== Mississippi ====
▌1. Roger Wicker (R)
▌2. Bennie Thompson (D)
▌3. Chip Pickering (R)
▌4. Gene Taylor (D)

==== Missouri ====
▌1. Lacy Clay (D)
▌2. Todd Akin (R)
▌3. Dick Gephardt (D)
▌4. Ike Skelton (D)
▌5. Karen McCarthy (D)
▌6. Sam Graves (R)
▌7. Roy Blunt (R)
▌8. Jo Ann Emerson (R)
▌9. Kenny Hulshof (R)

==== Montana ====
▌At-large. Denny Rehberg (R)

==== Nebraska ====
▌1. Doug Bereuter (R), until August 31, 2004, vacant thereafter
▌2. Lee Terry (R)
▌3. Tom Osborne (R)

==== Nevada ====
▌1. Shelley Berkley (D)
▌2. Jim Gibbons (R)
▌3. Jon Porter (R)

==== New Hampshire ====
▌1. Jeb Bradley (R)
▌2. Charlie Bass (R)

==== New Jersey ====
▌1. Rob Andrews (D)
▌2. Frank LoBiondo (R)
▌3. Jim Saxton (R)
▌4. Chris Smith (R)
▌5. Scott Garrett (R)
▌6. Frank Pallone (D)
▌7. Mike Ferguson (R)
▌8. Bill Pascrell Jr. (D)
▌9. Steve Rothman (D)
▌10. Donald M. Payne (D)
▌11. Rodney Frelinghuysen (R)
▌12. Rush Holt Jr. (D)
▌13. Bob Menendez (D)

==== New Mexico ====
▌1. Heather Wilson (R)
▌2. Steve Pearce (R)
▌3. Tom Udall (D)

==== New York ====
▌1. Tim Bishop (D)
▌2. Steve Israel (D)
▌3. Peter King (R)
▌4. Carolyn McCarthy (D)
▌5. Gary Ackerman (D)
▌6. Gregory Meeks (D)
▌7. Joe Crowley (D)
▌8. Jerry Nadler (D)
▌9. Anthony Weiner (D)
▌10. Edolphus Towns (D)
▌11. Major Owens (D)
▌12. Nydia Velázquez (D)
▌13. Vito Fossella (R)
▌14. Carolyn Maloney (D)
▌15. Charles Rangel (D)
▌16. José E. Serrano (D)
▌17. Eliot Engel (D)
▌18. Nita Lowey (D)
▌19. Sue W. Kelly (R)
▌20. John E. Sweeney (R)
▌21. Michael McNulty (D)
▌22. Maurice Hinchey (D)
▌23. John M. McHugh (R)
▌24. Sherwood Boehlert (R)
▌25. James T. Walsh (R)
▌26. Thomas M. Reynolds (R)
▌27. Jack Quinn (R)
▌28. Louise Slaughter (D)
▌29. Amo Houghton (R)

==== North Carolina ====
▌1. Frank Ballance (D), until June 9, 2004

▌G. K. Butterfield (D), from July 20, 2004

▌2. Bob Etheridge (D)
▌3. Walter B. Jones Jr. (R)
▌4. David Price (D)
▌5. Richard Burr (R)
▌6. Howard Coble (R)
▌7. Mike McIntyre (D)
▌8. Robin Hayes (R)
▌9. Sue Myrick (R)
▌10. Cass Ballenger (R)
▌11. Charles H. Taylor (R)
▌12. Mel Watt (D)
▌13. Brad Miller (D)

==== North Dakota ====
▌At-large. Earl Pomeroy (D-NPL)

==== Ohio ====
▌1. Steve Chabot (R)
▌2. Rob Portman (R)
▌3. Mike Turner (R)
▌4. Mike Oxley (R)
▌5. Paul Gillmor (R)
▌6. Ted Strickland (D)
▌7. Dave Hobson (R)
▌8. John Boehner (R)
▌9. Marcy Kaptur (D)
▌10. Dennis Kucinich (D)
▌11. Stephanie Tubbs Jones (D)
▌12. Pat Tiberi (R)
▌13. Sherrod Brown (D)
▌14. Steve LaTourette (R)
▌15. Deborah Pryce (R)
▌16. Ralph Regula (R)
▌17. Tim Ryan (D)
▌18. Bob Ney (R)

==== Oklahoma ====
▌1. John Sullivan (R)
▌2. Brad Carson (D)
▌3. Frank Lucas (R)
▌4. Tom Cole (R)
▌5. Ernest Istook (R)

==== Oregon ====
▌1. David Wu (D)
▌2. Greg Walden (R)
▌3. Earl Blumenauer (D)
▌4. Peter DeFazio (D)
▌5. Darlene Hooley (D)

==== Pennsylvania ====
▌1. Bob Brady (D)
▌2. Chaka Fattah (D)
▌3. Phil English (R)
▌4. Melissa Hart (R)
▌5. John Peterson (R)
▌6. Jim Gerlach (R)
▌7. Curt Weldon (R)
▌8. Jim Greenwood (R)
▌9. Bill Shuster (R)
▌10. Don Sherwood (R)
▌11. Paul Kanjorski (D)
▌12. John Murtha (D)
▌13. Joseph M. Hoeffel (D)
▌14. Mike Doyle (D)
▌15. Patrick Toomey (R)
▌16. Joseph R. Pitts (R)
▌17. Tim Holden (D)
▌18. Tim Murphy (R)
▌19. Todd Russell Platts (R)

==== Rhode Island ====
▌1. Patrick J. Kennedy (D)
▌2. James Langevin (D)

==== South Carolina ====
▌1. Henry Brown (R)
▌2. Joe Wilson (R)
▌3. Gresham Barrett (R)
▌4. Jim DeMint (R)
▌5. John Spratt (D)
▌6. Jim Clyburn (D)

==== South Dakota ====
▌At-large. Bill Janklow (R), until January 20, 2004

▌Stephanie Herseth (D), from June 1, 2004

==== Tennessee ====
▌1. Bill Jenkins (R)
▌2. John Duncan (R)
▌3. Zach Wamp (R)
▌4. Lincoln Davis (D)
▌5. Jim Cooper (D)
▌6. Bart Gordon (D)
▌7. Marsha Blackburn (R)
▌8. John Tanner (D)
▌9. Harold Ford Jr. (D)

==== Texas ====
▌1. Max Sandlin (D)
▌2. Jim Turner (D)
▌3. Sam Johnson (R)
▌▌4. Ralph Hall (D, then R)
▌5. Jeb Hensarling (R)
▌6. Joe Barton (R)
▌7. John Culberson (R)
▌8. Kevin Brady (R)
▌9. Nick Lampson (D)
▌10. Lloyd Doggett (D)
▌11. Chet Edwards (D)
▌12. Kay Granger (R)
▌13. Mac Thornberry (R)
▌14. Ron Paul (R)
▌15. Rubén Hinojosa (D)
▌16. Silvestre Reyes (D)
▌17. Charles Stenholm (D)
▌18. Sheila Jackson-Lee (D)
▌19. Larry Combest (R), until May 31, 2003

▌Randy Neugebauer (R), from June 5, 2003

▌20. Charlie Gonzalez (D)
▌21. Lamar Smith (R)
▌22. Tom DeLay (R)
▌23. Henry Bonilla (R)
▌24. Martin Frost (D)
▌25. Chris Bell (D)
▌26. Michael C. Burgess (R)
▌27. Solomon P. Ortiz (D)
▌28. Ciro Rodriguez (D)
▌29. Gene Green (D)
▌30. Eddie Bernice Johnson (D)
▌31. John Carter (R)
▌32. Pete Sessions (R)

==== Utah ====
▌1. Rob Bishop (R)
▌2. Jim Matheson (D)
▌3. Chris Cannon (R)

==== Vermont ====
▌At-large. Bernie Sanders (I)

==== Virginia ====
▌1. Jo Ann Davis (R)
▌2. Ed Schrock (R)
▌3. Bobby Scott (D)
▌4. Randy Forbes (R)
▌5. Virgil Goode (R)
▌6. Bob Goodlatte (R)
▌7. Eric Cantor (R)
▌8. Jim Moran (D)
▌9. Rick Boucher (D)
▌10. Frank Wolf (R)
▌11. Tom Davis (R)

==== Washington ====
▌1. Jay Inslee (D)
▌2. Rick Larsen (D)
▌3. Brian Baird (D)
▌4. Doc Hastings (R)
▌5. George Nethercutt (R)
▌6. Norm Dicks (D)
▌7. Jim McDermott (D)
▌8. Jennifer Dunn (R)
▌9. Adam Smith (D)

==== West Virginia ====
▌1. Alan Mollohan (D)
▌2. Shelley Moore Capito (R)
▌3. Nick Rahall (D)

==== Wisconsin ====
▌1. Paul Ryan (R)
▌2. Tammy Baldwin (D)
▌3. Ron Kind (D)
▌4. Jerry Kleczka (D)
▌5. Jim Sensenbrenner (R)
▌6. Tom Petri (R)
▌7. Dave Obey (D)
▌8. Mark Green (R)

==== Wyoming ====
▌At-large. Barbara Cubin (R)

==== Non-voting members ====
▌American Samoa. Eni Faleomavaega (D)
▌District of Columbia. Eleanor Holmes Norton (D)
▌Guam. Madeleine Bordallo (D)
▌Puerto Rico. Aníbal Acevedo Vilá (Resident Commissioner) (D/PPD)
▌Virgin Islands. Donna Christian-Christensen (D)

House majority leadership

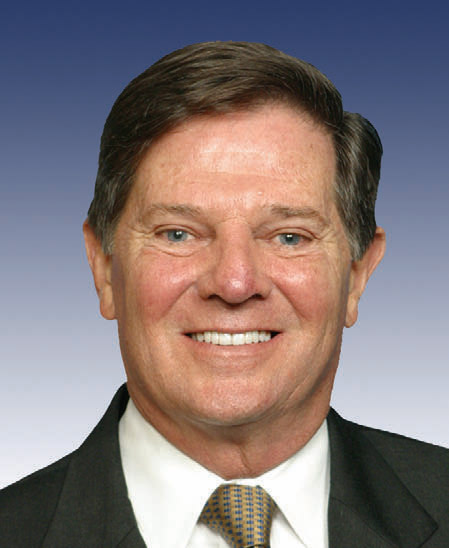
Republican leader
Tom DeLay

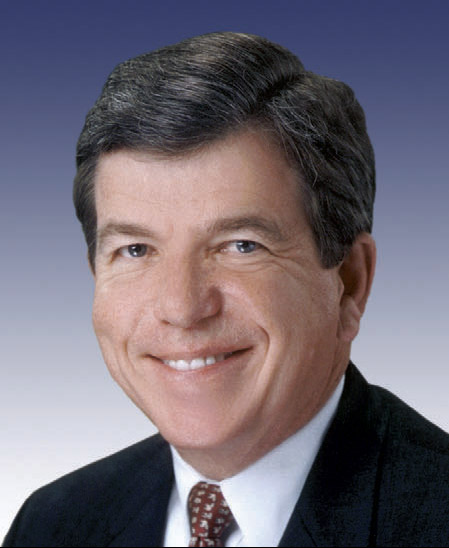
Republican whip
Roy Blunt

House minority leadership

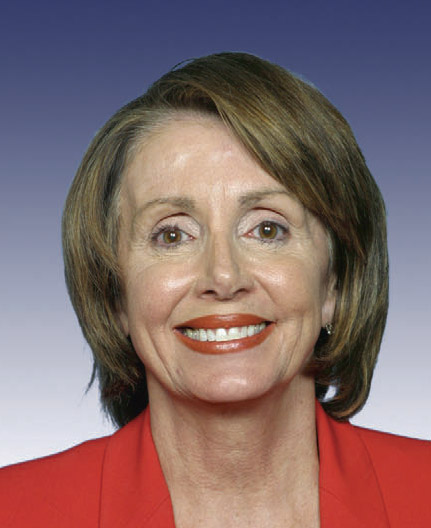
Democratic leader
Nancy Pelosi

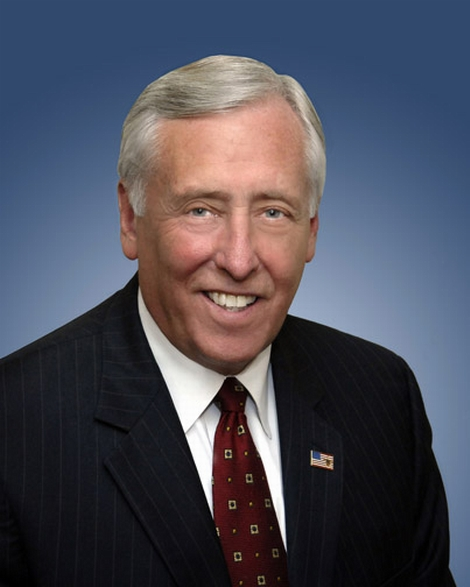
Democratic whip
Steny Hoyer

== Changes in membership ==
Members who came and left during this Congress.

=== Senate ===
There were no changes in Senate membership during this Congress.

=== House of Representatives ===
House changes
District	Vacated by	Reason for change	Successor	Date of successor's formal installation (Note: When seated or oath administered, not necessarily when service began.)
Hawaii 2nd	Ed Case (D)	Member-elect Patsy Mink (D) died September 28, 2002, but was posthumously elected to the 108th Congress. Ed Case had won a special election for the seat in the 107th Congress November 30, 2002, but not for the 108th Congress. A special election was held January 4, 2003.	Ed Case (D)	January 4, 2003
Texas 19th	Larry Combest (R)	Incumbent resigned May 31, 2003, for personal reasons. A special election was held June 3, 2003.	Randy Neugebauer (R)	June 5, 2003
Texas 4th	Ralph Hall (D)	Changed political parties, with no interruption in his service.	Ralph Hall (R)	January 5, 2004
Kentucky 6th	Ernie Fletcher (R)	Incumbent resigned December 9, 2003, to become Governor of Kentucky. A special election was held February 17, 2004	Ben Chandler (D)	February 17, 2004
South Dakota at-large	Bill Janklow (R)	Incumbent resigned January 20, 2004, because of a December 2003 felony conviction in relation to a traffic accident. A special election was held June 1, 2004.	Stephanie Herseth (D)	June 1, 2004
North Carolina 1st	Frank Ballance (D)	Incumbent resigned June 9, 2004, as a result of health problems. A special election was held July 20, 2004	G. K. Butterfield (D)	July 20, 2004
Louisiana 5th	Rodney Alexander (D)	Switched parties August 9, 2004	Rodney Alexander (R)	August 9, 2004
Nebraska 1st	Doug Bereuter (R)	Incumbent resigned August 31, 2004, to head the Asia Foundation.	Remained vacant until the next Congress.	
Florida 14th	Porter Goss (R)	Incumbent resigned September 23, 2004, to head the CIA.	Remained vacant until the next Congress.	
California 5th	Bob Matsui (D)	Incumbent died January 1, 2005.	Remained vacant until the next Congress.	

== Committees ==
Lists of committees and their party leaders for members of the House and Senate committees can be found through the Official Congressional Directory at the bottom of this article. The directory after the pages of terms of service lists committees of the Senate, House (Standing with Subcommittees, Select and Special) and Joint and, after that, House/Senate committee assignments. On the committees section of the House and Senate in the Official Congressional Directory, the committee's members on the first row on the left side shows the chairman of the committee and on the right side shows the ranking member of the committee.

=== Senate ===
Committee	Chairman	Ranking Member
Aging (special)	Larry Craig (R-ID)	John Breaux (D-LA)
Agriculture, Nutrition and Forestry	Thad Cochran (R-MS)	Tom Harkin (D-IA)
Appropriations	Ted Stevens (R-AK)	Robert Byrd (D-WV)
Armed Services	John Warner (R-VA)	Carl Levin (D-MI)
Banking, Housing and Urban Affairs	Richard Shelby (R-AL)	Paul Sarbanes (D-MD)
Budget	Don Nickles (R-OK)	Kent Conrad (D-ND)
Commerce, Science and Transportation	John McCain (R-AZ)	Fritz Hollings (D-SC)
Energy and Natural Resources	Pete Domenici (R-NM)	Jeff Bingaman (D-NM)
Environment and Public Works	Jim Inhofe (R-OK)	Jim Jeffords (I-VT)
Ethics (select)	George Voinovich (R-OH)	Harry Reid (D-NV)
Finance	Chuck Grassley (R-IA)	Max Baucus (D-MT)
Foreign Relations	Richard Lugar (R-IN)	Joe Biden (D-DE)
Governmental Affairs	Susan Collins (R-ME)	Joe Lieberman (D-CT)
Health, Education, Labor and Pensions	Judd Gregg (R-NH)	Ted Kennedy (D-MA)
Indian Affairs	Ben Nighthorse Campbell (R-CO)	Daniel Inouye (D-HI)
Intelligence (select)	Pat Roberts (R-KS)	Jay Rockefeller (D-WV)
Judiciary	Orrin Hatch (R-UT)	Patrick Leahy (D-VT)
Rules and Administration	Trent Lott (R-MS)	Chris Dodd (D-CT)
Small Business and Entrepreneurship	Olympia Snowe (R-ME)	John Kerry (D-MA)
Veterans' Affairs	Arlen Specter (R-PA)	Daniel Akaka (D-HI)

=== House of Representatives ===
- Agriculture (Bob Goodlatte, Chair; John Boehner, Vice Chair)
  - Conservation, Credit and Rural Development (Frank D. Lucas, Chair; Tom Osborne, Vice Chair)
  - Department Operations, Oversight, Nutrition and Forestry (Gil Gutknecht, Chair; Dennis Rehberg, Vice Chair)
  - General Farm Commodities and Risk Management (Jerry Moran, Chair; Nick Smith, Vice Chair)
  - Livestock and Horticulture (Robin Hayes, Chair; Doug Ose, Vice Chair)
  - Specialty Crops and Foreign Agriculture Programs (William L. Jenkins, Chair; Terry Everett, Vice Chair)
- Appropriations (Bill Young, Chair; Dave Obey, Ranking Member)
  - Agriculture, Rural Development, Food and Drug Administration and Related Agencies (Henry Bonilla, Chair; Marcy Kaptur, Ranking Member)
  - Commerce, Justice, State and the Judiciary (Frank R. Wolf, Chair; Jose E. Serrano, Ranking Member)
  - Defense (Jerry Lewis, Chair; John Murtha, Ranking Member)
  - District of Columbia (Rodney P. Frelinghuysen, Chair; Chaka Fattah, Ranking Member)
  - Energy and Water Development (David L. Hobson, Chair; Pete Visclosky, Ranking Member)
  - Foreign Operations, Export Financing and Related Programs (Jim Kolbe, Chair; Nita Lowey, Ranking Member)
  - Homeland Security (Hal Rogers, Chair; Martin Olav Sabo, Ranking Member)
  - Interior (Charles H. Taylor, Chair; Norm Dicks, Ranking Member)
  - Legislative (Jack Kingston, Chair; Jim Moran, Ranking Member)
  - Military Construction (Joe Knollenberg, Chair; Chet Edwards, Ranking Member)
  - Transportation, Treasury and Independent Agencies (Ernest J. Istook Jr., Chair; John Olver, Ranking Member)
  - VA, HUD and Independent Agencies (James T. Walsh, Chair; Alan Mollohan, Ranking Member)
- Armed Services (Duncan Hunter, Chair; Ike Skelton, Ranking Member)
  - Projection Forces (Roscoe G. Bartlett, Chair; Gene Taylor, Ranking Member)
  - Readiness (Joel Hefley, Chair; Solomon P. Ortiz, Ranking Member)
  - Strategic Forces (Terry Everett, Chair; Silvestre Reyes, Ranking Member)
  - Tactical Air and Land Forces (Curt Weldon, Chair; Neil Abercrombie, Ranking Member)
  - Terrorism, Unconventional Threats and Capabilities (Jim Saxton, Chair; Marty Meehan, Ranking Member)
  - Total Force (John M. McHugh, Chair; Vic Snyder, Ranking Member)
- Budget (Jim Nussle, Chair; John M. Spratt Jr., Ranking Member)
- Education and the Workforce (John Boehner, Chair; George Miller, Ranking Member)
  - Education Reform (Michael Castle, Chair; Lynn Woolsey, Ranking Member)
  - Employer-Employee Relations (Sam Johnson, Chair; Robert E. Andrews, Ranking Member)
  - Select Education (Peter Hoekstra, Chair; Ruben Hinojosa, Ranking Member)
  - Workforce Protections (Charlie Norwood, Chair; Major Owens, Ranking Member)
  - 21st Century Competitiveness (Buck McKeon, Chair; Dale Kildee, Ranking Member)
- Energy and Commerce (Billy Tauzin, Chair; Richard Burr, Vice Chair)
  - Commerce, Trade and Consumer Protection (Cliff Stearns, Chair; John B. Shadegg, Vice Chair)
  - Energy and Air Quality (Joe Barton, Chair; John Shimkus, Vice Chair)
  - Environment and Hazardous Materials (Paul E. Gillmor, Chair; Vito Fossella, Vice Chair)
  - Health (Michael Bilirakis, Chair; Charlie Norwood, Vice Chair)
  - Oversight and Investigations (James C. Greenwood, Chair; Greg Walden, Vice Chair)
  - Telecommunications and the Internet (Fred Upton, Chair; Cliff Stearns, Vice Chair)
- Financial Services (Mike Oxley, Chair; Barney Frank, Ranking Member)
  - Capital Markets, Insurance and Government-Sponsored Enterprises (Richard H. Baker, Chair; Paul Kanjorski, Ranking Member)
  - Domestic and International Monetary Policy, Trade and Technology (Peter T. King, Chair; Carolyn Maloney, Ranking Member)
  - Financial Institutions and Consumer Credit (Spencer Bachus, Chair; Bernie Sanders, Ranking Member)
  - Housing and Community Opportunity (Bob Ney, Chair; Maxine Waters, Ranking Member)
  - Oversight and Investigations (Sue W. Kelly, Chair; Luis Guiterrez, Ranking Member)
- Government Reform (Thomas Davis, Chair; Henry Waxman, Ranking Member)
  - Civil Service and Agency Organization (Jo Ann Davis, Chair; Danny K. Davis, Ranking Member)
  - Criminal Justice, Drug Policy and Human Resources (Mark Souder, Chair; Elijah E. Cummings, Ranking Member)
  - Energy Policy, Natural Resources and Regulatory Affairs (Doug Ose, Chair; John Tierney, Ranking Member)
  - Government Efficiency and Financial Management (Todd R. Platts, Chair; Edolphus Towns, Ranking Member)
  - Human Rights and Wellness (Dan Burton, Chair; Diane Watson, Ranking Member)
  - National Security, Emerging Threats and International Relations (Christopher Shays, Chair; Dennis J. Kucinich, Ranking Member)
  - Technology, Information Policy, Intergovernmental Relations and the Census (Adam Putnam, Chair; William Lacy Clay, Ranking Member)
- House Administration (Bob Ney, Chair; John B. Larson, Ranking Member)
- International Relations (Henry J. Hyde, Chair; Tom Lantos, Ranking Member)
  - Africa (Ed Royce, Chair; Donald Payne, Ranking Member)
  - Asia and the Pacific (Jim Leach, Chair; Eni Faleomavaega, Ranking Member)
  - Europe (Doug Bereuter, Chair; Robert Wexler, Ranking Member)
  - International Terrorism, Nonproliferation and Human Rights (Elton Gallegly, Chair; Brad Sherman, Ranking Member)
  - The Middle East and Central Asia (Ileana Ros-Lehtinen, Chair; Gary Ackerman, Ranking Member)
  - The Western Hemisphere (Cass Ballenger, Chair; Robert Menendez, Ranking Member)
- Judiciary (Jim Sensenbrenner, Chair; John Conyers, Ranking Member)
  - Commercial and Administrative Law (Chris Cannon, Chair; Mel Watt, Ranking Member)
  - The Constitution (Steve Chabot, Chair; Jerrold Nadler, Ranking Member)
  - Courts, The Internet and Intellectual Property (Lamar S. Smith, Chair; Howard Berman, Ranking Member)
  - Crime, Terrorism and Homeland Security (Howard Coble, Chair; Bobby Scott, Ranking Member)
  - Immigration, Border Security and Claims (John Hostettler, Chair; Sheila Jackson Lee, Ranking Member)
- Resources (Richard Pombo, Chair; Jim Gibbons, Vice Chair)
  - Energy and Mineral Resources (Barbara Cubin, Chair; Ron Kind, Ranking Member)
  - Fisheries Conservation, Wildlife and Oceans (Wayne T. Gilchrest, Chair; Frank Pallone Jr., Ranking Member)
  - Forests and Forest Health (Scott McInnis, Chair; Jay Inslee, Ranking Member)
  - National Parks, Recreation and Public Lands (George P. Radanovich, Chair; Donna Christian-Christensen, Ranking Member)
  - Water and Power (Ken Calvert, Chair; Grace Napolitano, Ranking Member)
- Rules (David Dreier, Chair; Porter Goss, Vice Chair)
  - The Legislative Process (Deborah Pryce, Chair; Lincoln Diaz-Balart, Vice Chair)
  - Technology and the House (John Linder, Chair; Sue W. Myrick, Vice Chair)
- Science (Sherwood Boehlert, Chair; Ralph M. Hall, Ranking Member)
  - Energy (Judy Biggert, Chair; Nick Lampson, Ranking Member)
  - Environment, Technology and Standards (Vernon Ehlers, Chair; Mark Udall, Ranking Member)
  - Research (Nick Smith, Chair; Eddie Bernice Johnson, Ranking Member)
  - Space and Aeronautics (Dana Rohrabacher, Chair; Bart Gordon, Ranking Member)
- Small Business (Donald A. Manzullo, Chair; Nydia Velázquez, Ranking Member)
  - Regulatory Reform and Oversight (Edward L. Schrock, Chair; Charles A. Gonzalez, Ranking Member)
  - Rural Enterprises, Agriculture and Technology (Sam Graves, Chair; Frank Ballance, Ranking Member)
  - Tax, Finance and Exports (Patrick J. Toomey, Chair; Juanita Millender-McDonald, Ranking Member)
  - Workforce, Empowerment and Government Programs (W. Todd Akin, Chair; Tom Udall, Ranking Member)
- Standards of Official Conduct (Joel Hefley, Chair; Alan B. Mollohan, Ranking Member)
- Transportation and Infrastructure (Don Young, Chair; Jim Oberstar, Ranking Member)
  - Aviation (John Mica, Chair; Peter A. DeFazio, Ranking Member)
  - Coast Guard and Maritime Transportation (Frank A. LoBiondo, Chair; Bob Filner, Ranking Member)
  - Economic Development, Public Buildings and Emergency Management (Steve LaTourette, Chair; Eleanor Holmes Norton, Ranking Member)
  - Highways, Transit and Pipelines (Tom Petri, Chair; Bill Lipinski, Ranking Member)
  - Railroads (Jack Quinn, Chair; Corrine Brown, Ranking Member)
  - Water Resources and Environment (John J. Duncan Jr., Chair; Jerry F. Costello, Ranking Member)
- Veterans' Affairs (Chris Smith, Chair; Lane Evans, Ranking Member)
  - Benefits (Henry E. Brown Jr., Chair; Michael Michaud, Ranking Member)
  - Health (Rob Simmons, Chair; Ciro Rodriguez, Ranking Member)
  - Oversight and Investigations (Steve Buyer, Chair; Darlene Hooley, Ranking Member)
- Ways and Means (Bill Thomas, Chair; Charles Rangel, Ranking Member)
  - Health (Nancy Johnson, Chair; Pete Stark, Ranking Member)
  - Human Resources (Wally Herger, Chair; Ben Cardin, Ranking Member)
  - Oversight (Amo Houghton, Chair; Earl Pomeroy, Ranking Member)
  - Select Revenue Measures (Jim McCrery, Chair; Michael McNulty, Ranking Member)
  - Social Security (E. Clay Shaw Jr., Chair; Bob Matsui, Ranking Member)
  - Trade (Phil Crane, Chair; Sander Levin, Ranking Member)
- Whole

=== Joint committees ===
- Economic (Sen. Robert F. Bennett, Chair; Rep. Jim Saxton, Vice Chair)
- Taxation (Rep. Bill Thomas, Chair; Sen. Chuck Grassley, Vice Chair)
- The Library (Sen. Ted Stevens, Chair; Rep. Vernon J. Ehlers, Vice Chair)
- Printing (Rep. Bob Ney, Chair; Sen. Saxby Chambliss, Vice Chair)

== Employees ==
=== Legislative branch agency directors ===
- Architect of the Capitol: Alan M. Hantman
- Attending Physician of the United States Congress: John F. Eisold
- Comptroller General of the United States: David M. Walker
- Director of the Congressional Budget Office: Barry B. Anderson, until February 5, 2003
  - Douglas Holtz-Eakin, from February 5, 2003
- Librarian of Congress: James H. Billington
- Public Printer of the United States: Bruce James

=== Senate ===
- Chaplain: Lloyd John Ogilvie (Presbyterian), until March 15, 2003
  - Barry C. Black (Seventh-day Adventist), from July 7, 2003
- Curator: Diane K. Skvarla
- Historian: Richard A. Baker
- Parliamentarian: Alan S. Frumin
- Secretary: Emily J. Reynolds
- Librarian: Greg Harness
- Secretary for the Majority: David J. Schiappa
- Secretary for the Minority: Martin P. Paone
- Sergeant at Arms: Alfonso E. Lenhardt, until March 17, 2003
  - William H. Pickle, from March 17, 2003

=== House of Representatives ===
Employees include: (Note: See also: Rules of the House: "Other officers and officials")

- Chaplain: Daniel P. Coughlin (Roman Catholic)
- Chief Administrative Officer: James M. Eagen III
- Clerk: Jeff Trandahl
- Inspector General: Steven McNamara
- Parliamentarian: Charles W. Johnson III, until May 31, 2004
  - John V. Sullivan, from May 31, 2004
- Reading Clerks: Mary Kevin Niland (Democratic); Paul Hays (Republican)
- Sergeant at Arms: Wilson Livingood

== See also ==
=== Elections ===
- 2002 United States elections (elections leading to this Congress)
  - 2002 United States Senate elections
  - 2002 United States House of Representatives elections
- 2004 United States elections (elections during this Congress, leading to the next Congress)
  - 2004 United States presidential election
  - 2004 United States Senate elections
  - 2004 United States House of Representatives elections
- Special elections to the 108th United States Congress

=== Membership lists ===
- List of new members of the 108th United States Congress
