= Department of Homeland Security Appropriations Act =

Department of Homeland Security Appropriations Act may refer to several appropriation bills passed by the United States Congress:

- Department of Homeland Security Appropriations Act, 2004 (Pub. L. 108–90)
- Department of Homeland Security Appropriations Act, 2005 (Pub. L. 108–334)
- Department of Homeland Security Appropriations Act, 2007 (H.R. 5441)
- Department of Homeland Security Appropriations Act, 2014 (H.R. 2217)
- Department of Homeland Security Appropriations Act, 2015 (H.R. 240, Pub. L. 114–4)
