= Special elections to the 108th United States Congress =

There were two special elections to the United States House of Representatives during 2003.

- On January 4, 2003, Ed Case (D) was re-elected to Hawaii's 2nd congressional district. His predecessor, Patsy Mink (D) had died September 28, 2002, and was posthumously re-elected in November. Case was elected in a November 30, 2002, special election to finish the term that ended January 3, 2003. Case was then re-elected on January 4, 2003, to the new term.
- On June 3, 2003, Randy Neugebauer (R) was elected to Texas's 19th congressional district. His predecessor, Larry Combest (R) had resigned May 31, 2003, after deaths in his family.

== See also ==
- Hawaii's 2nd congressional district special elections, 2002-2003
- Texas's 19th congressional district special election, 2003
- List of special elections to the United States Senate
- List of special elections to the United States House of Representatives
