= Veterans' Memorial Preservation and Recognition Act of 2003 =

The Veterans' Memorial Preservation and Recognition Act of 2003 is an act passed on March 29, 2003, by the 108th United States Congress and signed into law by President George W. Bush. Under the law, anyone who willfully damages a public structure, plaque, statue, or monument owned by or under the jurisdiction of the United States government that commemorates the military service of any person or group of persons will be fined and/or imprisoned for up to 10 years. The law also establishes that a veterans cemetery may warrant a supplemental guide sign on any federally-aided highway.
