= Suzanne Case =

Conservationist

Suzanne Case is a conservationist and natural resource manager in Hawaiʻi.

== Education ==
Born in Hilo, Hawaiʻi along with six siblings including her brother, Ed Case, a member of the United States Congress. She graduated from Punahou School on Oʻahu in 1974. She attended Williams College in Massachusetts and Stanford University where she graduated with honors in 1979, obtaining a BA in History. Case received her JD in 1983 from the University of California Hastings College of the Law in San Francisco where she was a member of the Hastings Law Journal.

== Summary of work ==
Case served as counsel for the Western United States and Pacific Region of The Nature Conservancy from 1987 to 2001 before becoming its Hawaiʻi and Palmyra Atoll Program Executive Director from 2001 to 2015. From 2015 to 2022, she served as the Chairperson of State of Hawaiʻi Department of Land and Natural Resources, the state agency responsible for the management of terrestrial and marine natural and cultural resources. She was active in working on stream restoration.

== Career ==
During her time at The Nature Conservancy, Case was involved in creating the Hakalau Forest National Wildlife Refuge on Mauna Kea and supervised eight Nature Conservancy Preserves. She implemented conservation projects in California, Idaho, Nevada, Utah, Colorado, Wyoming and Hawaiʻi. She was a critical help in establishing multiple other international conservation programs.

She was selected to become Chair of the Department of Land and Natural Resources in 2015 after the initial choice was criticised: Honolulu Civil Beat endorsed Case as a strong candidate. She was confirmed in April. Working in the Department of Land and Natural Resources as chairperson, she oversaw the acquisition of the 116,000-acre Kahuku Ranch in order to bring it under the umbrella of Hawaiʻi Volcanoes National Park. As part of her work in the Department of Land and Natural Resources, she served as Chair for the State Board of Land and Natural Resources and the State Commission on Water Resource Management, as well as co-chair of the Sustainable Hawaiʻi Initiative, the Hawaiʻi Climate Adaptation and Mitigation Commission, and the Hawaiʻi Invasive Species Committee, as well as a member of both the Hawaiʻi Board of Agriculture and the Kahoʻolawe Island Reserve Commission. During her leaving, she was honored by the state senate. She is currently Director of the University of Hawaii Office of Land and Ocean Conservation Futures, a role she took up in 2023. She also sits on the advisory council of the Bill Lane Center for the American West at Stanford University.

== Accomplishments ==
Case has received numerous conservation leadership awards, including the Ho‘okele Award in 2014. Case assisted in the creation of watershed partnerships for forested management in the state of Hawaii to connect and grow networks of local communities who would restore near-shore marine life. She helped implement large-scale projects to remove dangerous invasive algae from Hawaii's coral reefs and coastal areas.
