= 2002–03 Hawaii's 2nd congressional district special elections =

There were two United States House of Representatives special elections in Hawaii's 2nd congressional district within 35 days of each other to select the successor to Democrat Patsy Mink who had died from pneumonia. The elections, held November 30, 2002, and January 4, 2003, were officially nonpartisan and each held as general elections without primaries to pick a successor for the remainder of her term in the 107th Congress and for the next term in the 108th Congress, to which Mink was posthumously re-elected. Both elections were won by Democrat Ed Case.

== Background ==
On August 30, 2002, Mink was hospitalized in Honolulu's Straub Clinic and Hospital with complications from chickenpox. Her condition steadily worsened, and on September 28, 2002, Mink died in Honolulu of viral pneumonia. The week prior to her untimely death, she had won renomination. By this point, it was too late to remove her name from the general election ballot. On November 5, 2002, Mink was posthumously re-elected over state Representative Bob McDermott (R). As a result, this triggered two separate special elections: the first to fill the vacancy during the end of the 107th Congress and the second for the new term beginning on January 3, 2003. In accordance with Hawaiian law the elections were single nonpartisan races without primaries.

== Election to the 107th Congress (November 30, 2002) ==
Results by state house district Case: 40–50%; 50–60%; 60–70%; Mink: 40–50%; 50–60%

The two most notable candidates to compete in the first election were then-state representative and former state House Majority Leader Ed Case and John Mink, the former husband of the late Congresswoman. Despite the latter's connections to the district's prior representative, Case would win the election with fifty-one percent of the vote.

2002 Hawaii's 2nd district special election
Party	Candidate	Votes	%
Democratic	Ed Case	23,576	51.44%
Democratic	John Mink	16,624	36.27%
Republican	John S. Carroll	1,933	4.22%
Republican	Whitney Anderson	942	2.06%
Nonpartisan	Mark McNett	449	0.98%
Democratic	Kekoa David Kaapu	269	0.59%
Republican	Richard Haake	229	0.50%
Republican	Doug Fairhurst	173	0.38%
Republican	Kimo Kaloi	149	0.33%
Green	Nick Nikhilananda	136	0.30%
Democratic	Solomon Nalua'i	116	0.25%
Republican	Walter R. Barnes	94	0.21%
Republican	Carolyn Golojuch	94	0.21%
Republican	Clifford Rhodes	86	0.19%
Republican	Timmy Yuen	85	0.19%
Republican	Joe Conner	83	0.18%
Republican	Joseph Payne	69	0.15%
Democratic	Brian G. Cole	67	0.15%
Democratic	John L. Baker	66	0.14%
Democratic	Michael Gagne	62	0.14%
Republican	Bob Schieve	55	0.12%
Nonpartisan	Ron Jacobs	54	0.12%
Nonpartisan	Lillian Hong	51	0.11%
Democratic	Art Reyes	51	0.11%
Nonpartisan	John Mayer	47	0.10%
Libertarian	Jeff Mallan	33	0.07%
Libertarian	Lawrence Duquesne	32	0.07%
Democratic	Steve Tataii	28	0.06%
Nonpartisan	Bill Russell	27	0.06%
Nonpartisan	John Parker	27	0.06%
Green	Gregory Goodwin	27	0.06%
Democratic	Charles Collins	18	0.04%
Nonpartisan	Jack Randall	16	0.03%
Democratic	Paul Britos	15	0.03%
Nonpartisan	Dan A. Cole	15	0.03%
Nonpartisan	Mike Rethman	11	0.02%
Nonpartisan	S.J. Harlan	10	0.02%
Nonpartisan	Robert Martin Jr.	10	0.02%
Total votes		46,216	100%

== Election to the 108th Congress (January 4, 2003) ==
Results by state house district Case: 30–40%; 40–50%; 50–60%; Matsunaga: 30–40%; 40–50%; 50–60%; Hanabusa: 30–40%

The now-freshman incumbent Case immediately ran for reelection in the early January 2003 race for the second district seat in the 108th Congress, going up against more than three dozen other candidates. Other Democrats included state Senators Matt Matsunaga and Colleen Hanabusa. Republicans included state Representatives Barbara Marumoto and Bob McDermott, and former Honolulu Mayor Frank Fasi. Case won this election with 43 percent of the vote.

2003 Hawaii's 2nd district special election
Party	Candidate	Votes	%
Democratic	Ed Case	33,002	43.67%
Democratic	Matt Matsunaga	23,050	30.5%
Democratic	Colleen Hanabusa	6,046	8.00%
Republican	Barbara Marumoto	4,497	5.95%
Republican	Bob McDermott	4,298	5.69%
Republican	Chris Halford	728	0.96%
Republican	Kimo Kaloi	642	0.85%
Republican	John S. Carroll	521	0.69%
Republican	Frank Fasi	483	0.64%
Nonpartisan	Mark McNett	449	0.59%
Republican	Jim Rath	414	0.55%
Republican	Richard Haake	212	0.28%
Republican	Nelson Secretario	208	0.28%
Republican	Whitney Anderson	201	0.27%
Nonpartisan	Ron Jacobs	91	0.12%
Green	Nick Nikhilananda	75	0.10%
Democratic	Brian G. Cole	69	0.09%
Democratic	Kekoa David Kaapu	68	0.09%
Libertarian	Jeff Mallan	58	0.08%
Nonpartisan	Sophie Mataafa	52	0.07%
Republican	Doug Fairhurst	38	0.05%
Democratic	Michael Gagne	35	0.05%
Republican	Carolyn Martinez Golojuch	29	0.04%
Green	Gregory Goodwin	27	0.04%
Republican	Rich Payne	25	0.03%
Republican	Clarence Weatherwax	25	0.03%
Nonpartisan	Kabba Anand	24	0.03%
Nonpartisan	Dan Vierra	22	0.03%
Republican	John Sabey	20	0.03%
Democratic	Pat Rocco	19	0.03%
Nonpartisan	Bill Russell	18	0.02%
Nonpartisan	Steve Sparks	17	0.02%
Nonpartisan	Solomon Wong	16	0.02%
Democratic	Art Reyes	15	0.02%
Democratic	Paul Britos	13	0.02%
Nonpartisan	S.J. Harlan	11	0.01%
Democratic	Charles Collins	10	0.01%
Nonpartisan	Jack Randall	9	0.01%
Democratic	Steve Tataii	9	0.01%
Nonpartisan	Marshall Turner	8	0.01%
Republican	Mike Rethman	8	0.01%
Democratic	Herbert Jensen	6	0.01%
Nonpartisan	Alan Gano	3	0.01%
Nonpartisan	Bartle Rowland	3	0.01%
Total votes		76,328	100%
