= GAO Human Capital Reform Act =

- Other short titles: GAO Human Capital Reform Act of 2004
- Long title: To provide new human capital flexibilities with respect to the GAO, and for other purposes
- Enacted by: the 108th United States Congress
- Effective: July 7, 2004

Citations
- Public law: Pub. L. 108–271 (text) (PDF)
- Statutes at Large: 118 Stat. 211

Codification
- Titles amended: Title 31 of the United States Code: Money and Finance

Legislative history
- Introduced in the House as H.R. 2751 by Rep. Jo Ann Davis (R–VA) on July 16, 2003; Committee consideration by House Government Reform; Senate Governmental Affairs; Passed the House on November 21, 2003 (416–0 (Roll no. 635)); Passed the Senate on June 24, 2004 (Unanimous consent); Signed into law by President George W. Bush on July 7, 2004

For United States federal law, the GAO Human Capital Reform Act of 2004 (Pub. L. 108–271 (text) (PDF), 118 Stat. 811, enacted July 7, 2004) provides new human capital flexibilities with respect to the Government Accountability Office, and for other purposes. The most visible provision of the law was to change the name of the organization from the General Accounting Office, which it had been known as since its founding in 1921, to the Government Accountability Office. Besides the name change, the law:

- Decouples GAO from the federal employee pay system,
- Establishes a compensation system that places greater emphasis on job performance while protecting the purchasing power of employees who are performing acceptably,
- Gives GAO permanent authority to offer voluntary early retirement opportunities and voluntary separation payments (buy-outs),
- Provides greater flexibility for reimbursing employees for relocation benefits,
- Allows certain employees and officers with less than three years of federal service to earn increased amounts of annual leave, and
- Authorizes an exchange program with private sector organizations.
