= Belarus Democracy Act of 2004 =

- Long title: An Act to provide for the promotion of democracy, human rights, and rule of law in the Republic of Belarus and for the consolidation and strengthening of Belarus sovereignty and independence.
- Enacted by: the 108th United States Congress

Citations
- Public law: Pub. L. 108–347 (text) (PDF)

Legislative history
- Introduced in the House as H.R. 854 by Chris Smith (R-NJ) on February 13, 2003; Committee consideration by International Relations, Judiciary and Financial Services; Passed the House on October 4, 2004 (Voice vote); Passed the Senate on October 6, 2004 (Unanimous consent); Signed into law by President George W. Bush on October 20, 2004

The Belarus Democracy Act of 2004 is a United States federal law that authorizes assistance for political parties, non-governmental organizations, and independent media working to advance democracy and human rights in Belarus. The act was passed by the U.S. House of Representatives, by voice vote, on October 4, 2004; was passed by the U.S. Senate, by unanimous consent, on October 6, 2004; and was signed into law by President George W. Bush on October 20, 2004. It is codified, as amended, at 22 U.S.C. 5811 note.

The law expresses the sense of Congress that the Belarusian authorities should not receive various types of non-humanitarian financial aid from the U.S. It also calls for the President to report to Congress on arms sales by Belarus to state sponsors of terrorism and on the personal wealth and assets of senior Belarus officials.

The U.S., said President Bush in his signing statement of October 20, 2004, "will work with our allies and partners to assist those seeking to return Belarus to its rightful place among the Euro-Atlantic community of democracies."

All three bills were introduced by Representative Chris Smith of New Jersey.

Earlier versions of the act that were introduced in 2001 and 2003 but not enacted into law were more severe, prohibiting travel of Belarusian officials, freezing assets, blocking certain trade, and referring to the role of Russia.

== Aftermath ==
Spokesman Richard Boucher of the U.S. Department of State stated, according to an October 26, 2004 editorial in the Voice of America, that the U.S. was concerned about the Belarusian government's increasingly repressive steps against independent news media and pro-democracy groups. He further stated that Belarusian security forces used excessive force against peaceful protesters following the parliamentary elections and referendum.

Belarusian President Alexander Lukashenko and his government were highly displeased with the passage of the act.

On December 8, 2006, the United States House of Representatives passed, and (following Senate enactment) on January 12, 2007, President Bush signed into law, the Belarus Democracy Reauthorization Act of 2006, a statute amending and updating the act.

On January 3, 2012, President Obama signed into law the Belarus Democracy and Human Rights Act of 2011, further amending and updating the act.

== See also ==
- List of people and organizations sanctioned in relation to human rights violations in Belarus
