= Ed Case =

American lawyer and politician (born 1952)

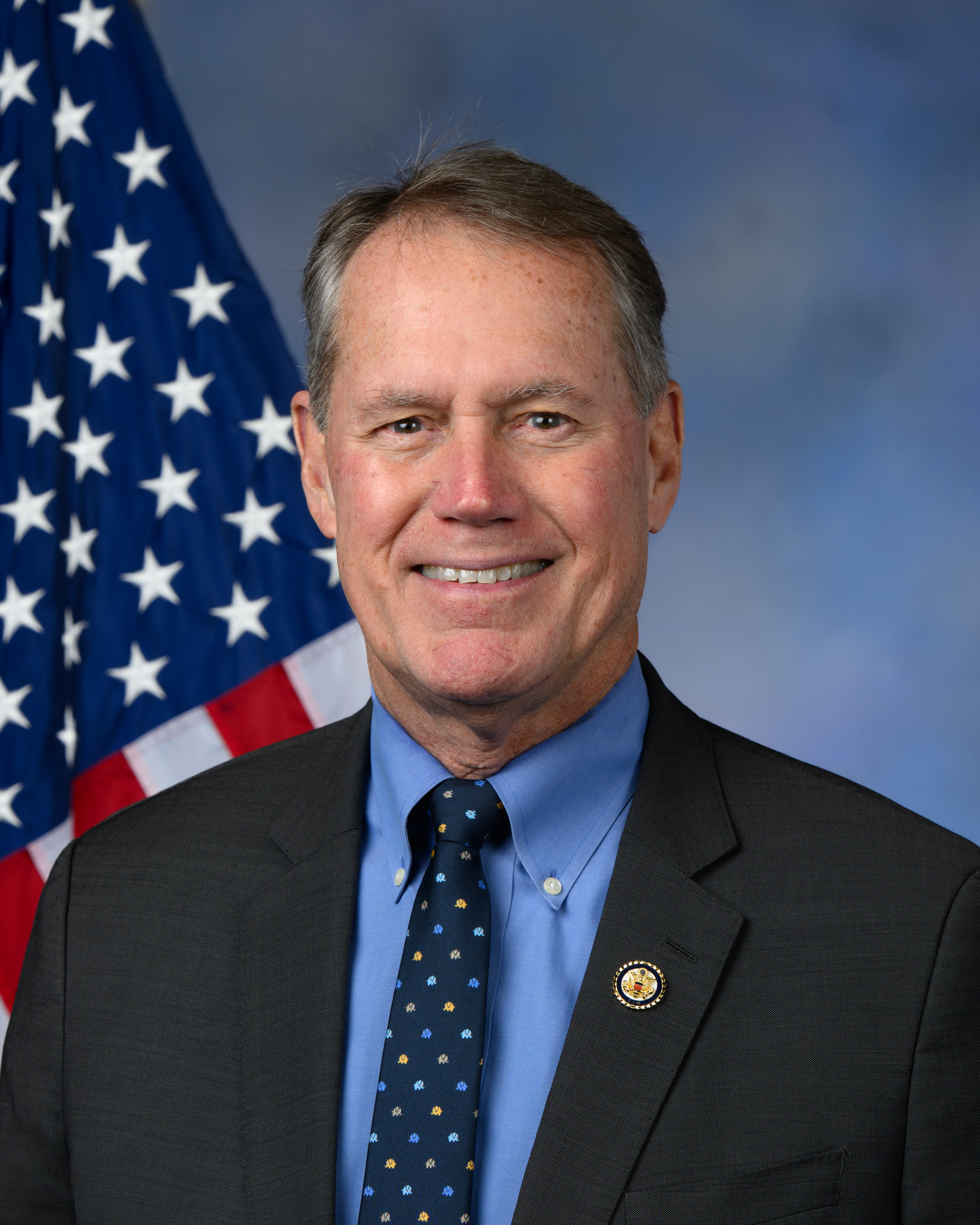
- Official portrait, 2025

Member of the U.S. House of Representatives from Hawaii
- Incumbent
- Assumed office January 3, 2019
- Preceded by: Colleen Hanabusa
- Constituency: 1st district
- In office January 4, 2003 – January 3, 2007 (Note: Case's official service begins on the date of the special election, while he was not sworn in until January 7, 2003.)
- Preceded by: Himself
- Succeeded by: Mazie Hirono
- Constituency: 2nd district
- In office November 30, 2002 – January 3, 2003 (Note: Case's official service begins on the date of the special election, while the House was adjourned sine die until the start of the next Congress on January 3, 2003, upon which his term ended.)
- Preceded by: Patsy Mink
- Succeeded by: Himself
- Constituency: 2nd district

Member of the Hawaii House of Representatives from the 23rd district
- In office November 8, 1994 – November 30, 2002
- Preceded by: Brian Taniguchi
- Succeeded by: Galen Fox

Personal details
- Born: Edward Espenett Case; September 27, 1952 (age 74) Hilo, Hawaii Territory, U.S.
- Party: Democratic
- Spouse: Audrey Nakamura (m. 2001)
- Children: 2
- Relatives: Suzanne Case (sister); Steve Case (cousin)
- Education: Williams College (BA); University of California, Hastings (JD)
- Website: House website Campaign website
- Case's voice Case honoring the Nisei-majority 100th Infantry Battalion on the unit's 80th anniversary. Recorded June 8, 2022

Edward Espenett Case (born September 27, 1952) is an American lawyer and politician. A member of the Democratic Party, he has served as the U.S. representative for Hawaii's 1st congressional district since 2019, which covers the urban core of Honolulu. He represented the 2nd district, which covers the rest of the state, from 2002 to 2007.

Case first came to prominence in Hawaii as majority leader of the Hawaii State Legislature and in his 2002 campaign for governor of Hawaii as a Blue Dog Democrat. He was elected to the House of Representatives in 2002 in a special election to fill the seat of Patsy Mink, who died of pneumonia, Case represented Hawaii's 2nd congressional district until 2006, when he unsuccessfully challenged Daniel Akaka in the Democratic primary for the U.S. Senate.

In 2010, Case was one of two Democratic candidates in the special election for Hawaii's 1st congressional district. With the Democratic vote split, Republican Councilman Charles Djou's 39% of the vote earned him the seat. Case ran again in the Democratic primary for the November general election, but suspended his campaign in May. Colleen Hanabusa, Case's fellow Democrat in the special election, won the primary and the general election against Djou. Case again ran for the Senate in 2012 after Akaka announced his retirement, but lost to Mazie Hirono.

In July 2013, Case announced that he was joining Outrigger Enterprises Group and that his political career was "likely" over. However, in June 2018, Case announced he would run again in Hawaii's 1st congressional district. He won the crowded Democratic primary election in August and the general election. He took office in January 2019.

== Early life, education, and legal career ==
Case was born in Hilo, the eldest of six children. In 1970, he graduated from Hawaii Preparatory Academy in Kamuela. After high school, Case traveled for a year in Australia, where he worked as a jackaroo on a New South Wales sheep station, and in New Zealand. He then attended Williams College in Williamstown, Massachusetts, where he obtained his bachelor's degree in psychology in 1975.

In 1981, Case graduated from the University of California Hastings College of Law in San Francisco with a Juris Doctor.

From 1981 to 1982, Case served as law clerk to Hawaii Supreme Court Chief Justice William S. Richardson. From 1983 to 2002, he worked at the law firm Carlsmith Ball in Honolulu, where he became a partner in 1989, and served as managing partner from 1992 to 1994, when he was first elected to the Hawaii House of Representatives. Case resigned his partnership upon winning election to the United States Congress in 2002. In 2007 he said he would work for the Honolulu-based law firm of Bays Deaver Lung Rose & Baba.

== Early political career ==
Case got his first taste of political life as a legislative assistant to Congressman and then Senator Spark Matsunaga from 1975 to 1978. In 1985, he won his first election, to the Mānoa Neighborhood Board of Honolulu. He became its chairman in 1987, a position he held until leaving the board in 1989.

== Hawaii House of Representatives ==
=== Elections ===
In 1994, Case ran for Hawaii's 23rd House district. He won the Democratic primary with 51% of the vote in a five-candidate field. In the general election, he defeated Green party nominee Toni Worst 59%–41%. In 1996, he was reelected with 67% of the vote. In 1998, he was reelected to a third term with 70% of the vote. In 2000, he was reelected to a fourth term unopposed.

=== Tenure ===
Case served four two-year terms in the Hawaii House of Representatives from 1994 to 2002, where he focused on basic change in Hawaii governance. In 1999, after he led an effort to replace the State House leadership, his Democratic peers elected him Majority Leader.

A conservative Democrat by Hawaii standards, Case sought to change the way state government operated and repeatedly warned that Hawaii was not addressing long-term fiscal challenges. On the last legislative day of 2000, he said in a floor speech: "If you cannot make those choices, please get out of the way, because you are just making it harder for the rest of us."

On January 21, 1997, in the House Judiciary Committee, Case cast the lone vote against advancing HB117, which would allow a referendum to effectively constitutionally ban gay marriage. He and six others opposed the bill again in the full House vote. When he was up for reelection in November 1998, he publicly opposed the referendum because, he said, "changing the Constitution would go against its intended purpose—protecting the rights of the minority against the will of the majority." Leading up to the November election, polls consistently predicted that the measure would pass by 70–75%, a prediction that was accurate. Due to the measure's popularity, only three other politicians or candidates in Hawaii joined his position.

In 2001, Case co-sponsored an unsuccessful civil unions bill.

=== Committee assignments ===
Case was a part of the House Judiciary Committee.

== U.S. House of Representatives ==
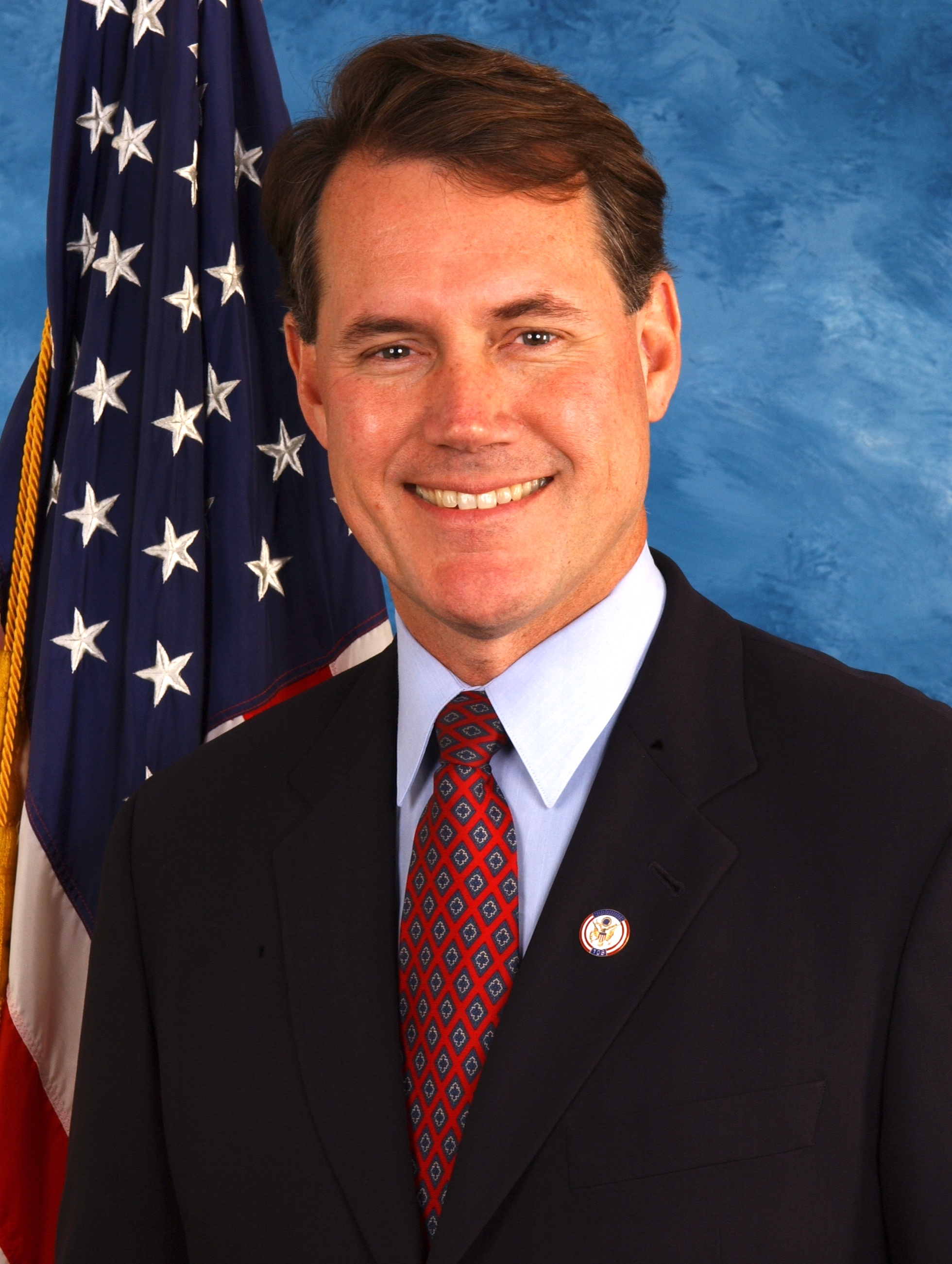
Case during the 107th Congress

=== Elections ===
==== 2002 ====
U.S. Representative Patsy Mink died on September 28, 2002, one week after the primary election, leaving her 107th Congress (2001–2003) seat vacant. She was posthumously reelected to the 108th Congress (2003–2005) in November. On November 30, 2002, Case was elected in a special election to serve the remaining two months of Mink's term, gaining over 50% of the vote in a field of over 40, even though he did not live in the district. Members of the House are only constitutionally required to live in the state they represent, though convention calls for them to live in the district they represent. During the special election campaign, Case pointed out that he grew up on the Big Island.

==== 2003 ====
Case ran in a second special election on January 4, 2003, for Mink's 108th Congress seat, facing more than three dozen other candidates. Other Democrats included Matt Matsunaga and Colleen Hanabusa. Republicans included Barbara Marumoto, Bob McDermott, and Frank Fasi. Case won with 43% of the vote.

==== 2004 ====
In 2004, Case defeated Republican challenger Mike Gabbard, a social conservative who focused almost exclusively on gay marriage issues. He won his first full term with 63% of the vote.

==== 2018 ====
In June 2018, Case ran in the crowded Democratic primary, set for August 11. He won with 40% of the vote, defeating six other challengers, including Doug Chin, the incumbent lieutenant governor. This all but assured his return to Congress after a 12-year absence. In the general election, Case carried Hawaii's 1st congressional district by a 50-point margin, 73.1%—23.1%, defeating Republican Campbell Cavasso.

==== 2020 ====
He was reelected in 2020 with 72.02% of the vote, defeating Republican Ron Curtis.

=== Tenure ===
==== 2002–2007 ====
Case sponsored 36 bills between 2003 and 2006. Of those bills, Congress passed H.Con.Res.218 recognizing 100 years of Filipino-American immigration to America, the Kaloko-Honokohau National Historical Park Addition Act (H.R.546 / Public Law No. 108-142), legislation (H.R. 2030 / Public Law No: 108-5) designating the U.S. Postal Service facility in Paia, Hawaii, as the Patsy Takemoto Mink Post Office Building, and the Kilauea Point National Wildlife Refuge Expansion Act (H.R. 2619 / Public Law No. 108-481). Two of his other bills were included in subsequent legislation. H.R. 3535, to include country of origin labeling for macadamia nuts, was included in the 2008 Farm Bill. Hirono reintroduced the Kalaupapa Memorial Act (H.R. 4529), which she added to Public Law No. 111-11.

Case entered the House of Representatives too late to cast a vote on the Iraq War Resolution, but supported the Iraq War throughout his tenure in the House. As late as 2006, he opposed a firm timetable for withdrawal.

Case often sided with Republicans on major tax legislation. He was one of only 34 Democrats (who sided with 196 Republicans) to support reducing the estate tax. He also was one of 15 Democrats (who sided with 229 Republicans) to support lower taxes on investment income.

In 2005, Case voted for an amendment by Jeb Hensarling that would eliminate funding for PBS, NPR, and Title X family planning, including money for Planned Parenthood. He was the only Democrat to support the amendment, which failed 102–320.

Case also introduced the Northwestern Hawaiian Islands National Marine Refuge Act (H.R. 2376), which would have protected the Northwestern Hawaiian Islands by making them a national marine refuge. In June 2006, President George W. Bush achieved much of the bill's goals by issuing a public proclamation creating the Papahanaumokuakea Marine National Monument under the authority of the Antiquities Act of 1906.

Case co-sponsored 808 bills during the same period. He missed 148 (6%) of 2,435 votes in his tenure.

==== 2019–present ====
Case rejoined the Blue Dog Coalition on January 29, 2019.

On July 25, 2019, Case, Don Young, Brad Sherman and Ted Yoho founded the Congressional Pacific Islands Caucus in order to increase Congressional attention to the Indo-Pacific region.

On August 27, 2019, Case introduced H.R. 4547, the Safe and Quiet Skies Act. The bill would regulate tour airplane and helicopter flights and, among other things, set decibel limits over residential neighborhoods, prohibit overflights of military facilities, national parks, and residential areas by air tours and require a sterile cockpit. The introduction followed two fatal air tour helicopter crashes in Hawaii that killed 14 people.

On December 18, 2019, Case voted to impeach President Donald Trump.

In August 2021, Case joined a group of conservative Democrats, dubbed "The Unbreakable Nine", who threatened to derail the Biden administration's $3.5 trillion budget reconciliation package meant to tackle the nation's infrastructure.

As of 2022, Case voted with President Joe Biden's stated position 100% of the time, according to FiveThirtyEight. Case voted to provide Israel with support following the October 7 attacks.

In February 2023, it was reported that he declined to renew his Blue Dog Coalition membership for the second time due to internal discourse over the caucus' direction and a failed effort to rebrand the group.

On July 11, 2024, Case called for Joe Biden to withdraw from the 2024 United States presidential election.

On March 6, 2025, Case was one of ten Democrats in Congress who joined all of their Republican colleagues in voting to censure Democratic congressman Al Green for interrupting President Donald Trump's State of the Union Address which he said "was to respect the institution".

On April 10, 2025, Case was one of only four Democrats who joined all of the Republicans in the House in voting in favor of the Safeguard American Voter Eligibility Act, commonly known as the SAVE Act. The bill places strict requirements to prove American citizenship in order to vote in federal elections.

Case is one of the most conservative Democrats in Congress and has received most of his financial campaign contributions from PACs.

On August 8, 2026, Case won renomination in the 2026 Democratic primary, defeating progressive candidate Jarrett Keohokalole.

=== Committee assignments ===
For the 119th Congress:

- Committee on Appropriations
  - Subcommittee on Defense
  - Subcommittee on Homeland Security

=== Caucus memberships ===
Case's caucus memberships include:

- Congressional Asian Pacific American Caucus (executive board member)
- Congressional Equality Caucus
- Congressional Wildlife Refuge Caucus
- New Democrat Coalition
- U.S.–Japan Caucus

== Other political campaigns ==
=== 2002 gubernatorial election ===
In early 2001, at the beginning of his fourth term in the Hawaii State House, Case chose not to continue as Majority Leader. In October 2001, he announced his candidacy for governor of Hawaii in 2002. Case's initial opponent was the early favorite in the race, Mayor of Honolulu Jeremy Harris, also a Democrat. Case supporters were discontented with the "Democratic Party of Hawaii machine" that had ruled the state for 40 years and was perceived to have left the economy stagnant, a "machine" to which Harris was closely tied.

Despite high polling numbers, Harris abruptly dropped out of the race in May 2002 because of ongoing campaign spending investigations. Lieutenant Governor Mazie Hirono dropped out of her race for mayor of Honolulu to challenge Case in the primary. A later entrant into the Democratic primary was D. G. "Andy" Anderson, the former Republican state chair and aide to former Honolulu Mayor Frank Fasi. Case told Hawaii voters that his campaign was one of government reform and the future, as opposed to Hirono and Anderson, who represented the "Old Boys' Network" and a status quo past.

In one of the closest primary elections for the Democratic gubernatorial nomination in Hawaii history, Hirono beat Case, 41% to 40%, with Anderson a distant third with 17%. In the general election, Hirono lost to Republican nominee Linda Lingle.

=== 2006 U.S. Senate election ===
Case challenged Senator Daniel Akaka in the Democratic primary election. He lost the September primary, 55-45%.

Akaka centered his campaign on the difference in support for the U.S. intervention in Iraq. He was one of only a handful of Democratic senators to vote against the use of force resolution against Iraq in 2002; Case, while not in Congress at the time of the vote, had said he would have voted in support of the resolution.

Despite his loss, Case decided to stay in politics.

=== 2010 special congressional election ===
On March 29, 2009, Case announced his candidacy for Hawaii's 1st congressional district seat, being vacated by Neil Abercrombie. His main opponents were fellow Democrat Colleen Hanabusa and Republican Charles Djou. Case and Hanabusa represented different wings of the party, Case being a conservative Blue Dog Democrat, while Hanabusa was preferred by the progressive wing. Hanabusa was endorsed by EMILY's List, the local party establishment, and local labor unions. Case was at odds with the party establishment over his primary challenge to Akaka in 2006 when he was still Representative of the 2nd district.

Case and Hanabusa each proposed that the other drop out for the sake of party unity. The Democratic Congressional Campaign Committee (DCCC) dispatched an aide to the state in the hopes of at least ensuring no other Democrats enter the race. It was unlikely either Democrat would drop out; they represented different views and had already faced off in a 2003 special election for Hawaii's 2nd congressional district, which Case won. On May 10, 2010, the DCCC said it would not spend any further resources on the race, preferring to save those resources for the November election.

The election was held on May 22, 2010. Djou became the first Republican to win a Hawaii congressional election since 1988. He won with a plurality of 39% of the vote. Hanabusa came in second with 31% and Case came in third with 28% of the vote.

Case initially said he would run in the next primary against Hanabusa, but later changed his mind and dropped out of the race, citing party unity and his third-place finish.

=== 2012 U.S. Senate election ===
On April 10, 2011, Case announced his candidacy for U.S. Senate, to replace retiring U.S. Senator Daniel Akaka.

In a rematch of the 2002 gubernatorial primary, Hirono once again defeated him, this time by a 17-point margin, 58%–41%.

== Papers ==
The Ed Case Papers were donated to the University of Hawaii at Manoa Library and are held in the Hawaii Congressional Papers Collection of the Library's Archives & Manuscripts Department. The Papers consist of materials from his years in Congress and the Hawaii legislature, as well as campaign material from his successful and unsuccessful campaigns. The papers were processed in 2007 by archivist Ellen Chapman, and will be opened for research on January 3, 2037.

== Personal life ==
Case has two children from his first marriage from 1988 to 1998. In 2001, he married Audrey Nakamura, a former classmate from Hawaii Preparatory Academy, who is a flight attendant with United Airlines. He became reacquainted with her at their 30th class reunion. Nakamura also had two children from a previous marriage.

Case's cousin, Steve Case, is the co-founder of America Online, as well as the former chairman of Time Warner.

Case is Protestant. Case has also received criticism for referring to himself as "an Asian trapped in a white body".

== Electoral history ==
=== Hawaii House of Representatives ===
Hawaii State House Elections 1994: District 23
Primary election
Party	Candidate	Votes	%
Democratic	Ed Case	2,860	50.74
Democratic	Tom Heinrich	1,179	20.92
Democratic	Charles H. Y. Dang	851	15.10
Democratic	Philmund W. M. Lee	506	8.98
Democratic	Richard Thompson	241	4.28
Total votes		5,637	100
General election
Democratic	Ed Case	5,196	59.27
Green	Toni Worst	3,571	40.73
Total votes		8,767	100
Democratic hold			

Hawaii State House Elections 1996: District 23
Party	Candidate	Votes	%
Democratic	Ed Case (incumbent)	5,852	67.43
Republican	Ken Harding	2,827	32.57
Total votes		8,679	100
Democratic hold			

Hawaii State House Elections 1998: District 23
Party	Candidate	Votes	%
Democratic	Ed Case (incumbent)	6,216	70.37
Republican	Walter Yim	2,398	27.15
Natural Law	Lauri Clegg	219	2.48
Total votes		8,833	100
Democratic hold			

Hawaii State House Elections 2000: District 23
Primary election
Party	Candidate	Votes	%
Democratic	Ed Case (incumbent)	4,017	74.46
Democratic	Jason Katsuji Iwai	1,378	25.54
Total votes		5,395	100
General election
Democratic	Ed Case (incumbent)	unopposed	100
Total votes		N/A	100
Democratic hold			

=== Governor of Hawaii ===
Hawaii Democratic Gubernatorial Primary 2002
Party	Candidate	Votes	%
Democratic	Mazie Hirono	76,709	41.24
Democratic	Ed Case	74,096	39.84
Democratic	D.G. "Andy" Anderson	33,384	17.95
Democratic	George Nitta, Jr.	747	0.40
Democratic	Art P. Reyes	568	0.31
Democratic	Joe Fernandez	491	0.26
Total votes		185,995	100

=== United States Congress ===
US House special election, 2002: Hawaii District 2
Party	Candidate	Votes	%
Democratic	Ed Case	23,576	51.01
Democratic	John Mink	16,624	35.97
Republican	John S. Carroll	1,933	4.18
Republican	Whitney Anderson	942	2.04
—	other	3,141	6.80
Total votes		46,216	100
Democratic hold			

US House special election, 2003: Hawaii District 2
Party	Candidate	Votes	%
Democratic	Ed Case (incumbent)	33,002	43.24
Democratic	Matt Matsunaga	23,050	30.20
Democratic	Colleen Hanabusa	6,046	7.92
Republican	Barbara Marumoto	4,497	5.89
Republican	Bob McDermott	4,298	5.63
—	other	5,435	7.12
Total votes		76,328	100
Democratic hold			

United States House Elections 2004: Hawaii District 2
Primary election
Party	Candidate	Votes	%
Democratic	Ed Case (incumbent)	73,705	94.70
Democratic	John Gentile	4,121	5.30
Total votes		77,826	100
General election
Democratic	Ed Case (incumbent)	133,317	62.77
Republican	Mike Gabbard	79,072	37.23
Total votes		212,389	100
Democratic hold			

Hawaii Democratic US Senate Primary 2006
Party	Candidate	Votes	%
Democratic	Daniel Akaka (incumbent)	129,158	54.65
Democratic	Ed Case	107,163	45.35
Total votes		236,321	100

US House special election, 2010: Hawaii District 1
Party	Candidate	Votes	%
Republican	Charles Djou	67,610	39.68
Democratic	Colleen Hanabusa	52,802	30.99
Democratic	Ed Case	47,391	27.81
—	other	2,590	1.52
Total votes		170,393	100
Republican gain from Democratic			

Hawaii Democratic US Senate Primary 2012
Party	Candidate	Votes	%
Democratic	Mazie Hirono	134,745	57.67
Democratic	Ed Case	95,553	40.90
Democratic	Arturo Reyes	1,720	0.74
Democratic	Michael Gillespie	1,104	0.47
Democratic	Antonio Gimbernat	517	0.22
Total votes		233,639	100

United States House Elections 2018: Hawaii District 1
Primary election
Party	Candidate	Votes	%
Democratic	Ed Case	47,491	40.01
Democratic	Doug Chin	30,290	25.52
Democratic	Donna Mercado Kim	21,563	18.17
Democratic	Kaniela Ing	7,539	6.35
Democratic	Beth Fukumoto	7,476	6.30
Democratic	Ernie Yorihiko Martin	3,827	3.22
Democratic	Sam Puletasi	519	0.44
Total votes		118,705	100
General election
Democratic	Ed Case	134,650	73.10
Republican	Campbell Cavasso	42,498	23.07
Libertarian	Michelle Tippens	3,498	1.90
Green	Zach Burd	2,214	1.20
Nonpartisan politician	Calvin Griffin	1,351	0.73
Total votes		184,211	100
Democratic hold			

United States House Elections 2020: Hawaii District 1
Party	Candidate	Votes	%
Democratic	Ed Case (incumbent)	183,245	72.02
Republican	Ron Curtis	71,188	27.98
Total votes		254,433	100
Democratic hold			

United States House Elections 2022: Hawaii District 1
Primary election
Party	Candidate	Votes	%
Democratic	Ed Case (incumbent)	100,667	83.17
Democratic	Sergio Alcubilla	20,364	16.82
Total votes		121,031	100
General election
Democratic	Ed Case (incumbent)	143,546	73.70
Republican	Conrad Kress	51,217	26.30
Total votes		194,763	100
Democratic hold			

United States House Elections 2024: Hawaii District 1
Primary election
Party	Candidate	Votes	%
Democratic	Ed Case (incumbent)	84,114	92.01
Democratic	Cecil Hale	7,308	7.99
Total votes		91,422	100
General election
Democratic	Ed Case (incumbent)	164,237	71.84
Republican	Patrick Largey	64,373	28.16
Total votes		228,610	100
Democratic hold			

United States House Elections 2026: Hawaii District 1
Primary election
Party	Candidate	Votes	%
Democratic	Ed Case (incumbent)	63,784	58.46
Democratic	Jarrett Keohokālole	40,848	37.44
Democratic	Jennifer Booker	2,433	2.23
Democratic	Ben Fatula	1,025	0.94
Democratic	Nick Kiswanto	1,025	0.94
Total votes		109,115	100
General election
Democratic	Ed Case (incumbent)	126,337	71.78
Republican	Adriel Lam	40,308	22.90
Green	Jordan Conley	7,011	3.98
Nonpartisan politician	Nathan Berning	2,348	1.33
Total votes		176,004	100
Democratic hold			

U.S. House of Representatives
Preceded by Patsy Mink	Member of the U.S. House of Representatives from Hawaii's 2nd congressional district 2002–2003	Succeeded by Himself
Preceded by Himself	Member of the U.S. House of Representatives from Hawaii's 2nd congressional district 2003–2007	Succeeded by Mazie Hirono
Preceded by Colleen Hanabusa	Member of the U.S. House of Representatives from Hawaii's 1st congressional district 2019–present	Incumbent
Party political offices
Preceded by Tom O'Halleran	Chair of the Blue Dog Coalition for Policy; 2021–2023; Served alongside: Stephanie Murphy (Administration), Tom O'Halleran (Communications)	Succeeded by Jim Costa
U.S. order of precedence (ceremonial)
Preceded by Donald Norcross	United States representatives by seniority 124th	Succeeded by Pete Aguilar
