= Alaska Land Transfer Acceleration Act =

U.S. state law passed in 2004

The Alaska Land Transfer Acceleration Act (Pub. L. 108–452 (text) (PDF)) was a law passed on December 10, 2004. It was an attempt to resolve the conflicting land claims of three groups in time for the fiftieth anniversary of Alaska's statehood in 2009. The sections were divided into titles.

== Titles ==
Title I -- State Selections and Conveyances was an attempt to speed up the State selection process. Section 107 outlines a process to facilitate the conversion of Federal mining claims to State mining claims on land selected or topfiled by the State.

Title II -- Alaska Native Claims Settlement Act was an attempt to finalize the Regional and Village Corporation land selections under ANCSA. ALTAA Sec. 207 mandated a report to congress be produced regarding ANCSA 17(d)(1) withdrawals.

Title III -- Native Allotments In 2003, it was estimated that the remaining pending allotment applications totaled 3,256 acres (13.18 km^{2}) of land, approximately 1,100 acres (4.5 km^{2}) of which were erroneously conveyed to the State or to Native Corporations, and so no longer belong to the United States.

Title IV -- Final Priorities; Conveyance and Survey Plans . This stated the deadlines.

Title V -- Alaska Land Claims and Appeals. The act authorized the Secretary of the Interior to create a field office of DOI's Office of Hearings and Appeals in Alaska to handle disputes related to the Alaska land transfers.

Title VI -- Report and Authorization of Appropriations The act required the Secretary of the Interior, to deliver to Congress a report within three years of the bill's passage. The report had to detail the progress on the Alaska land transfers. Finally, the act made actions necessary in carrying out the Act legal.
