= Department of Homeland Security Appropriations Act, 2005 =

In the Department of Homeland Security Appropriations Act, 2005,(Pub. L. 108–334 (text) (PDF)) President Bush gave:

- $28.9 billion in net discretionary spending for the Department of Homeland Security
- $419.2 million in new funding to enhance border and port security activities
- $2.5 billion for Project BioShield
- $894 million for Information Analysis and Infrastructure Protection
- $5.1 billion for the Transportation Security Administration
- $475 million to continue deploying more efficient baggage screening at airports
- $115 million for air cargo security
- $663 million for Federal Air Marshals (FAMS) program
- $61 million is appropriated to the DHS Science and Technology directorate
- $4 billion for state and local assistance programs or First Responders
- 179 million for improvements in immigration enforcement
- 160 million in total resources towards immigration application processing
- $3.1 billion for the Emergency Preparedness and Response Directorate
- 15 million for the National Incident Management System (NIMS)

President George W. Bush signed the 2005 Act on October 18, 2004.

== See also ==
- United States Department of Homeland Security
- Homeland Security Act
