= Department of Homeland Security Appropriations Act, 2004 =

U.S. law

The Homeland Security Appropriations Act of 2004 (Pub. L. 108–90 (text) (PDF)) was a United States Act of Congress that gave the authority for the President to fund the operations of the Department of Homeland Security for each fiscal year.

== History ==
June 2003 The first Act was passed in June 2003 and authorized US$29.4 billion for Homeland Security.

October 2003

President George W. Bush signed the 2004 Act on October 1, 2003.

October 2004

The Act 2004 (PL 108-90) consisted of US $31 billion to be spent on:

- $5.6 billion for Project BioShield - to be used by the Department of Health and Human Services to finds ways to protect Americans (i.e., vaccines and treatments) from biological, or chemical, or radiological threats
- $4 billion of grants to create "first responders" as the first line of defense against threats to the United States; $40 million towards Citizen Corps Councils and other funds to the United States Coast Guard towards the Container Security Initiative
- $900 million in this bill will go to science and technology projects

== See also ==
- United States Department of Homeland Security
- Homeland Security Act
