= Barbara Marumoto =

American politician

Member of the Hawaii House of Representatives from the 19th district
- In office 1978–2012
- Succeeded by: Bertrand Kobayashi

Personal details
- Born: Barbara Okamoto; July 21, 1939 (age 87) San Francisco, California, U.S.
- Party: Republican
- Spouse(s): Wendell Marumoto Richard A. Coons (died 2012)
- Education: University of Hawaii at Manoa (BA)

Barbara Chizuko Marumoto-Coons (née Okamoto, born July 21, 1939) is a former member of the Hawaii State House of Representatives. She represented Kaimuki, Waialae, and Kahala as a Republican for 34 years.

== Biography ==
Barbara Okamoto was born in San Francisco in 1939, and spent part of her childhood detained at the Tanforan Assembly Center following the enforcement of Executive Order 9066. Her immediate family was able to transfer to Colorado, but her grandparents were incarcerated at the Topaz War Relocation Center during World War II.

Marumoto earned a bachelor's degree in sociology from the University of Hawaii. She also studied at the University of California, Berkeley, University of California, Los Angeles and San Francisco State University.

Marumoto was a delegate to the 1978 Hawaii Constitutional Convention. She served in the Hawaii House of Representatives since 1978. She is a Republican, and served as the Hawaii House Minority leader from 1984 to 1986 and again from 1998 to 2000. She did not seek reelection in 2012. As a lawmaker, she was best known for supporting small businesses, children's safety, tax reduction, and fiscal reform. Marumoto was also active in many community organizations, such as the Honolulu Japanese Chamber of Commerce, the AARP, and the Historic Hawaii Foundation.

She is married to Richard A. Coons, a retired CPA.
