= Whitney Anderson =

American politician and businessman (1931–2023)

Whitney T. Anderson (1931 – November 25, 2023) was an American politician and businessman from Waimanalo, Hawaii. He is the younger brother of D.G. "Andy" Anderson.

Anderson served for a total of 20 years in both chambers of the Hawaii State Legislature. Anderson's first experience in Hawaiian politics resulted from working on brother Andy's various campaigns for City Council, the Hawaii State Legislature, Mayor of Honolulu and Governor of Hawaii. Anderson later worked on the campaigns of other prominent Hawaii Republicans, including Gov. William F. Quinn and gubernatorial candidate Randy Crossley. He was also extremely involved with the state Association of Hawaiian Civic Clubs, having served as both Kailua Hawaiian Civic Club president and state Association of Hawaiian Civic Clubs president. Anderson is the first state Association of Hawaiian Civic Clubs president to lead an annual Club convention out-of-state.

Whitney Anderson's first stint in public office came in 1978, when he won a State House seat representing Kailua. Anderson would hold the positions of House Minority Floor Leader and House Minority Leader. In 1992, after fourteen years in the State House, Anderson decided to vacate his seat to run for Mayor of Honolulu against incumbent Mayor Frank Fasi in the GOP primary election. Anderson lost this election.

In late 1994, longtime Windward Oahu Republican state Sen. Mary George announced her retirement in the middle of a four-year term. Democratic Hawaii Gov. Benjamin J. Cayetano made Whitney Anderson his first appointee to the State Legislature, selecting Anderson to fill the remaining two years of retiring George's term. Anderson ran for re-election to the Hawaii State Senate in 1996, defeating former State House Vice Speaker Jackie Young in one of the year's most hotly contested races. Upon re-election to his state Senate seat, Anderson assumed the Senate Minority Leadership position, a position he held until his exit from the Senate in 2000. At the time of his departure from the Hawaii State Senate, Anderson was Hawaii's sole state senator of native Hawaiian ancestry.

Anderson's adopted hānai son and grandson, Ikaika Anderson, was elected to the Honolulu City Council as a councilmember in 2009 and announced his intention to seek the nomination of the Democratic Party for the U.S. House of Representatives for the urban core of Honolulu in August 2013.

In the 2006 elections, Anderson sought an at-large seat on the Office of Hawaiian Affairs Board of Trustees.

Anderson died in Waimanalo on November 25, 2023, at the age of 91.
