= National Flood Insurance Act of 1968 =

United States federal law

The National Flood Insurance Act of 1968 is a federal law in the United States that was enacted as Title XIII of the Housing and Urban Development Act of 1968 and signed into law by President Lyndon B. Johnson that led to the creation of the National Flood Insurance Program (NFIP).

== Origin of the act ==
The act was motivated by a long history of property damage and loss of life due to flooding. The legislation was finally promulgated because of the recent flood loss sustained in Florida and Louisiana following the destruction caused by the Hurricane Betsy flood surge in 1965. The 1967 Fairbanks flood that affected more than 12,000 in Fairbanks, Fort Wainwright, and surrounding areas also brought the bill to attention.

== National Flood Insurance Program ==
The NFIP goals are two-fold:

• To provide flood insurance for structures and contents in communities that adopt and enforce an ordinance outlining minimal floodplain management standards.
• To identify areas of high and low flood hazard and establish flood insurance rates for structures inside each flood hazard area.

== Amendments ==
The program was first amended by the Flood Disaster Protection Act of 1973, which made the purchase of flood insurance mandatory for the protection of property within special flood hazard areas (SFHAs). In 1982, the Act was amended by the Coastal Barrier Resources Act (CBRA). The CBRA enacted a set of maps depicting the John H. Chafee Coastal Barrier Resources System (CBRS) in which federal flood insurance is unavailable for new or significantly improved structures. The National Flood Insurance Reform Act of 1994 codified the Community Rating System (an incentive program that encourages communities to exceed the minimal federal requirements for development within floodplains) within the NFIP. The program was further amended by the Flood Insurance Reform Act of 2004, with the goal of reducing "losses to properties for which repetitive flood insurance claim payments have been made." More specifically, FIRA authorized FEMA to offer assistance in the buyout of Severe Repetitive Loss Properties to willing sellers and impose premium hikes on those that refused.

=== Biggert–Waters Flood Insurance Reform Act of 2012 ===
The Biggert–Waters Flood Insurance Reform Act of 2012 was "designed to allow premiums to rise to reflect the true risk of living in high-flood areas." The bill was supposed to deal with the increasing debt of the National Flood Insurance Program by requiring the premiums to reflect real flood risks. The result was a 10 fold increase in premiums. At present, $527 billion worth of property is in the coastal floodplain. The federal government heavily underwrites the flood insurance rates for these areas. The law "ordered FEMA to stop subsidizing flood insurance for second homes and businesses, and for properties that had been swamped multiple times." These changes were to occur gradually over the course of five years. FEMA was also instructed to do a study on the affordability of this process, a study which it has failed to complete.

=== Proposed ===
In January 2014, the United States Senate passed the Homeowner Flood Insurance Affordability Act of 2014 (S. 1926; 113th Congress). That bill would delay the increases in flood insurance premiums that were part of the Biggert–Waters Flood Insurance Reform Act of 2012. The reforms from that law were meant to require flood insurance premiums to actually reflect the real risk of flooding, which led to an increase in premiums. The National Flood Insurance Program is currently $24 billion in debt and taxpayers will be forced to pay for any additional payouts until that situation is solved.

In March 2014, the United States House of Representatives passed the Homeowner Flood Insurance Affordability Act of 2013 (H.R. 3370; 113th Congress), a similar but not identical bill to the Senate version (S. 1926). The bill would amend the National Flood Insurance Act of 1968 to prohibit the Federal Emergency Management Agency from providing flood insurance to prospective insureds at rates less than those estimated for any property purchased after the expiration of such six-month period (currently, any property purchased after July 6, 2012). It would also make additional reforms to the National Flood Insurance Program and delay some of the provisions of the Biggert–Waters Flood Insurance Reform Act of 2012.

== Criticism ==
According to critics of the program, the government's subsidized insurance plan "encouraged building, and rebuilding, in vulnerable coastal areas and floodplains." Stephen Ellis, of the group Taxpayers for Common Sense, points to "properties that flooded 17 or 18 times that were still covered under the federal insurance program" without premiums going up.

== See also ==
- Homeowner Flood Insurance Affordability Act of 2014 (S. 1926; 113th Congress)
