= Jeb Hensarling =

American politician (born 1957)

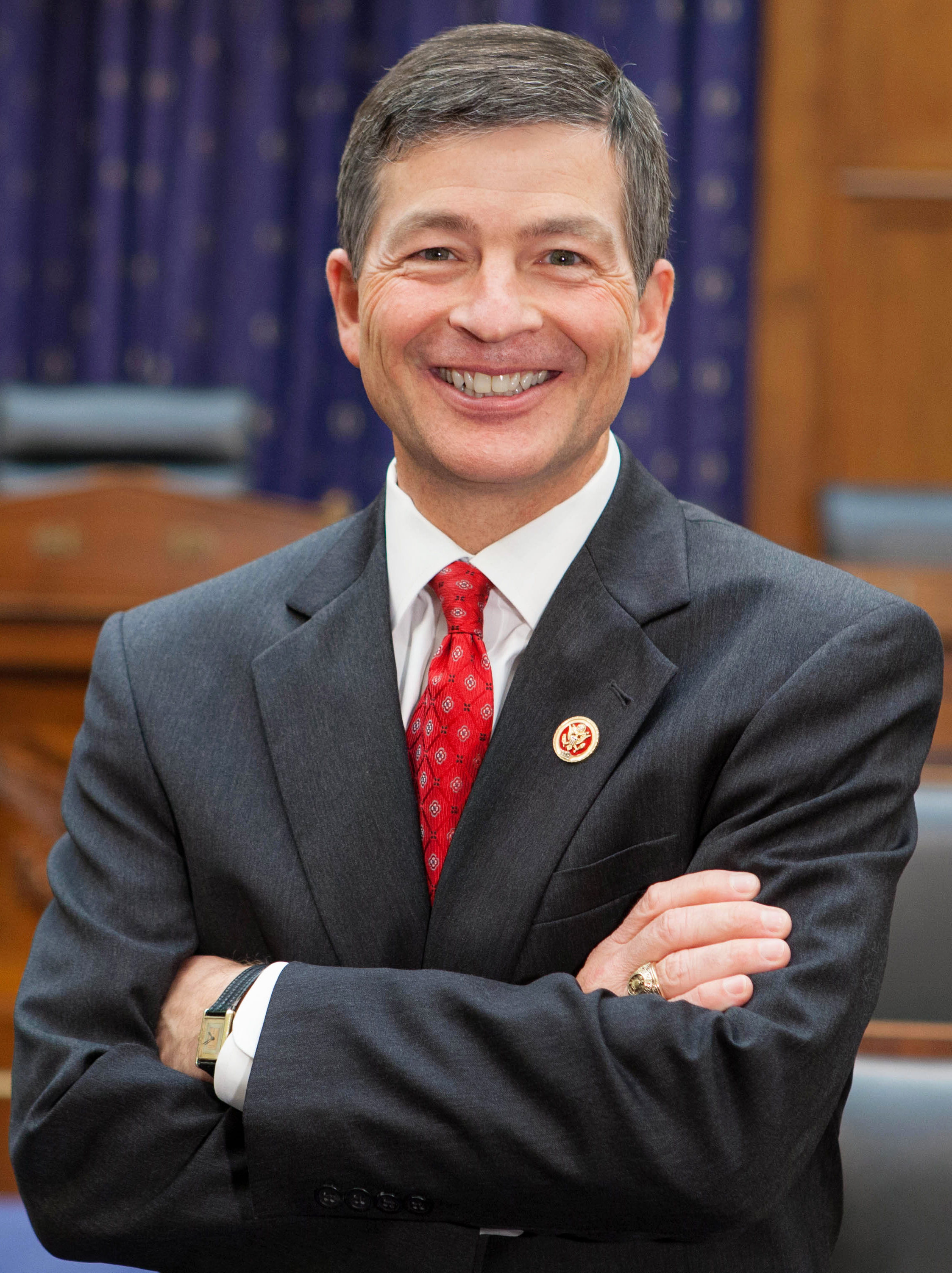
- Official portrait, 2013

Chair of the House Financial Services Committee
- In office January 3, 2013 – January 3, 2019
- Preceded by: Spencer Bachus
- Succeeded by: Maxine Waters

Chair of the House Republican Conference
- In office January 3, 2011 – January 3, 2013
- Leader: John Boehner
- Vice Chair: Cathy McMorris Rodgers
- Preceded by: Mike Pence
- Succeeded by: Cathy McMorris Rodgers

Member of the U.S. House of Representatives from Texas's 5th district
- In office January 3, 2003 – January 3, 2019
- Preceded by: Pete Sessions
- Succeeded by: Lance Gooden

Personal details
- Born: Thomas Jeb Hensarling; May 29, 1957 (age 69) Stephenville, Texas, U.S.
- Party: Republican
- Spouse: Melissa Hensarling
- Children: 2
- Education: Texas A&M University (BA); University of Texas, Austin (JD)
- Hensarling's voice Hensarling supporting the Housing Opportunity through Modernization Act of 2016. Recorded February 2, 2016

Thomas Jeb Hensarling (born May 29, 1957) is an American politician who served as the U.S. representative for Texas's 5th congressional district from 2003 to 2019. A member of the Republican Party, he chaired the House Republican Conference from 2011 to 2013 and House Financial Services Committee from 2013 until 2019. The Los Angeles Times described Hensarling, "a fervent believer in free market ideology" and that he was "a pivotal player in the GOP effort to reduce financial regulation in the Trump Era". The Wall Street Journal called him "a driver of economic policy in the house". Hensarling has close ties to Wall Street, having received campaign donations from every major Wall Street bank as well as various payday lenders.

On October 31, 2017, Hensarling announced that he would not seek reelection in 2018. In 2019, he revealed he was joining UBS Group AG as executive vice chairman for the Americas region. In 2023, he stepped down from that position.

== Early life ==
Hensarling was born in Stephenville, the seat of government of Erath County in Central Texas; he was reared on the family farm in College Station. Jeb Hensarling has one brother, James Andrew Hensarling (born 1954) now deceased, and a sister, Carolyn Hensarling Arizpe. He is an Episcopalian.

Like his late father, Jeb Hensarling graduated from Texas A&M University; he received a bachelor's degree in economics in 1979. In 1982, he earned a Juris Doctor degree from the University of Texas School of Law at Austin.

== Political career ==
Prior to serving in Congress, Hensarling was State Director for Texas Senator Phil Gramm from 1985 until 1989. He also managed Gramm's re-election campaign in 1990. From 1991 to 1993, he served as executive director of the Republican Senatorial Committee.

Hensarling next served as a vice president at two companies before becoming owner of San Jacinto Ventures in 1996 and CEO of Family Support Assurance Corporation in 2001. He served as vice president of Green Mountain Energy from 1999 to 2001.

Hensarling was elected to his first term in 2002, defeating Democratic opponent Ron Chapman with 58 percent of the vote. He was reelected in 2004 with 64 percent of the vote over Democratic challenger Bill Bernstein. In 2006, he was reelected with 62% of the votes over Charlie Thompson (D) with 36%, and in 2008 with 84% against Ken Ashby (L) with 16%. In 2010, Hensarling was reelected with 71% of the votes, in 2012 with 64% and in 2014 with 85%. In 2016 Hensarling gained a total of 80% of the votes and defeated Ken Ashby, who had received 20% of the votes.

A December 31, 2005, article in National Review profiled his work as the country's "budget nanny", saying that he replaced his mentor, former Senator Phil Gramm, in this role. Hensarling's proposed legislation was said to be intended to force Congress to "decide how much money they can afford to spend, and then prioritize within those limits." The article said that "the chief problem with any proposal to reform the budget process is that it excites almost nobody."

Hensarling was elected chairman of the Republican Study Committee following the 2006 congressional elections, defeating Todd Tiahrt.

From 2011 to 2013, Hensarling was chairman of the House Republican Conference. He served on the Congressional Oversight Panel of the Troubled Asset Relief Program, the National Commission on Fiscal Responsibility and Reform. Hensarling was also co-chair of the Joint Select Committee on Deficit Reduction.

After the 2012 election, Hensarling was elected as chairman of the House Committee on Financial Services, succeeding Rep. Spencer Bachus (R-Ala.).

After the election of Donald Trump as president, Hensarling met with him in Trump Tower and was considered for Secretary of the Treasury. Eventually, Steven Mnuchin was given the position. Later Hensarling became one of the earliest and most vocal critics of the Trump administration's trade policies.

=== Legislation ===
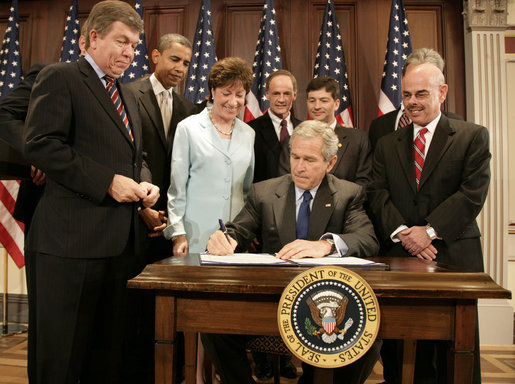
Congressman Hensarling and then Senator Barack Obama looked on President George W. Bush signs into law the Federal Funding Accountability and Transparency Act of 2006

Hensarling shepherded over 80 bills into law during his three terms as chairmen, most of them bipartisan.These included the Economic Growth Regulatory Relief and Consumer Protection Act which rewrote numerous provisions of the Dodd-Frank Act and is largely viewed as the most pro growth banking bill in a generation. His record also included passage of the bipartisan JOBS 2.0 legislation which facilitated capital formation for start ups and early growth companies as well as the Foreign Investment Risk Review Modernization Act of 2018 which provided major reforms to the Committee on Foreign Investment in the United States (CIFIUS), the government agency responsible for reviewing pending foreign investment for national security implications.

Hensarling opposed the Homeowner Flood Insurance Affordability Act of 2013 (H.R. 3370; 113th Congress), a bill that would delay some of the reforms to the National Flood Insurance Program. Hensarling criticized the bill, saying the bill would "postpone actuarially sound rates for perhaps a generation ... (and) kill off a key element of risk-based pricing permanently, which is necessary if we are to ever transition to market competition." Hensarling criticized the National Flood Insurance Programs for regularly underestimating flood risk. Hensarling is an opponent of the Dodd–Frank Wall Street Reform and Consumer Protection Act.

=== Committee assignments ===
- Committee on Financial Services (Chair)
  - Subcommittee on Capital Markets, Insurance, and Government-Sponsored Enterprises
  - Subcommittee on Financial Institutions and Consumer Credit
- Joint Select Committee on Deficit Reduction (Co-chair)

=== Voting record ===
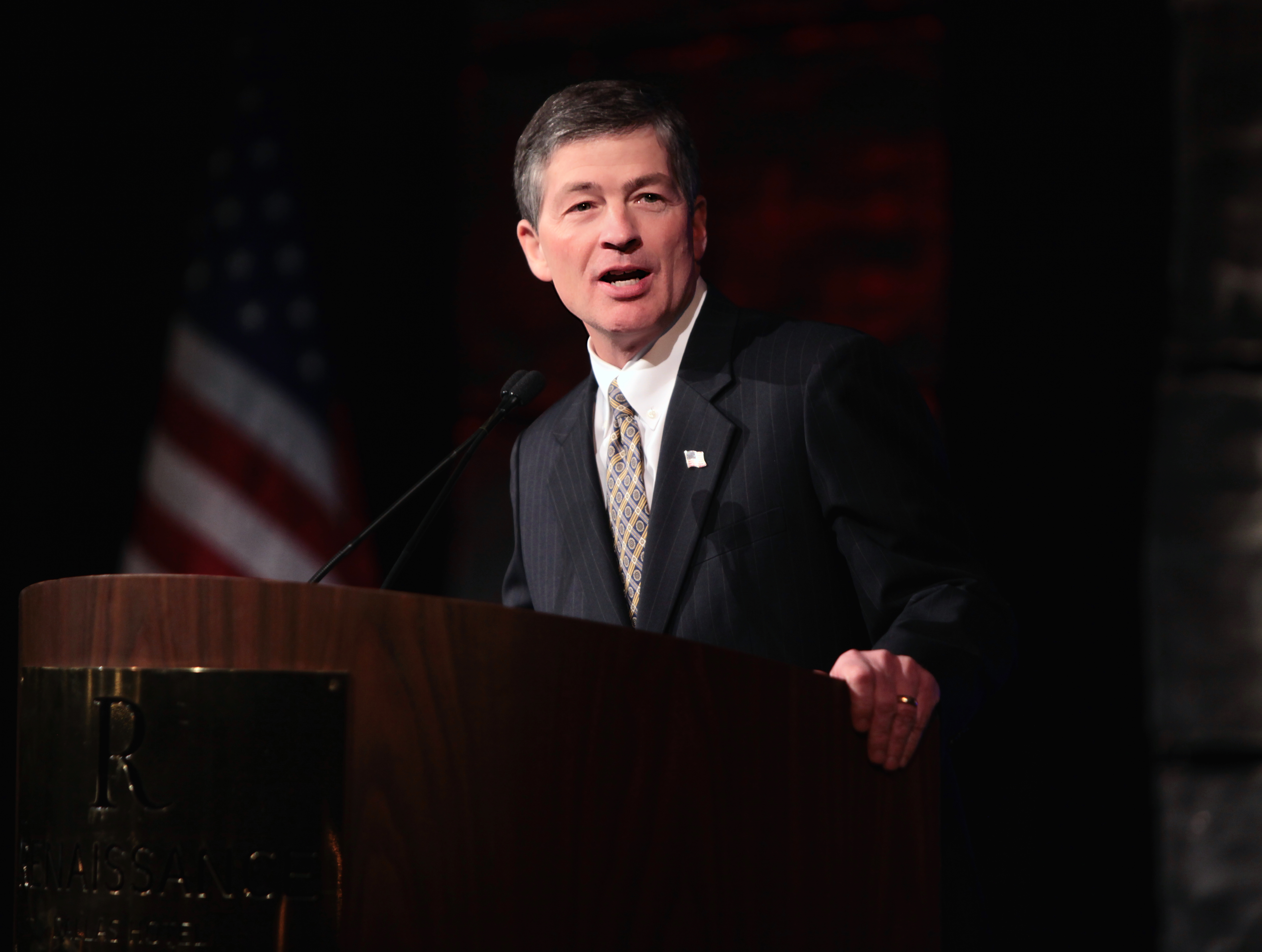
Congressman Jeb Hensarling speaking at the 2015 Reagan Dinner for the Dallas County Republican Party

During his Congressional tenure, Hensarling maintained a conservative voting record as evidenced by his 97% lifetime rating from the American Conservative Union.

Hensarling served on the House Committee on the Budget and chaired the House Committee on Financial Services. Hensarling was co-author of a constitutional amendment (known as the Spending Limit Amendment) that would prohibit federal spending from growing faster than the economy. Hensarling campaigned for Congress to enact a one-year moratorium on all Congressional earmarks, saying that the process needs to be overhauled. In 2007, he introduced the Taxpayer Bill of Rights. He also co-authored the Taxpayer Choice Act.

A vocal critic of the Consumer Financial Protection Bureau (CFPB), he received $210,500 from the payday lending industry (directly and through his political action committee) during the 2013-2014 election cycle, according to a report from the nonprofit Americans for Financial Reform.

=== 2008 ===
In January 2008, Hensarling was an original cosponsor of the Economic Growth Act of 2008.

In May 2008, Hensarling campaigned for the Republican party leadership in the House to agree to a special session to give lawmakers to air their views on a new policy platform and share ideas on how to define themselves to better advantage going into the 2008 election.

=== 2010 ===
On January 29, 2010, during President Barack Obama's meeting with House Republicans, Hensarling challenged Obama's position on the budget, asserting that the Obama White House was increasing the national deficit at the same rate per month that the previous President had increased it per year. President Obama responded with the following: "the whole question was structured as a talking point for running a campaign. ... [t]he fact of the matter is that when we came into office, the deficit was $1.3 trillion. So when you say that suddenly I've got a monthly budget that is higher than the annual – or a monthly deficit that's higher than the annual deficit left by Republicans, that's factually just not true, and you know it's not true." The Congressional Budget Office issued a projection in January 2009, before Obama took office, that the budget deficit would reach $1.2 trillion that year.

== Financial bailout ==
In September 2008, Hensarling led House Republican efforts to oppose Secretary Henry Paulson and Chairman Ben Bernanke's $700 billion financial bailout, and urged caution before Congress rushed to approve the plan. Along with Rep. Eric Cantor (R-VA) and Rep. Paul Ryan (R-WI), Hensarling backed an alternative plan that would have created a temporary government insurance for mortgage backed securities with premiums to be paid by financial institutions. The plan never received a vote.After voting against the bill, Hensarling said,

no one truly knows if this plan will work – though we all hope that it does. No one knows the true amount of taxpayer exposure. Treasury could spend $700 billion in no time flat and come right back to Congress for $700 billion more. Some believe the taxpayer will actually make money in the deal and I hope that proves true. But history as a guide, I have strong fears it will not. At what point do we finally bailout the American taxpayer from the unconscionable burden he or she faces from out of control Washington spending? I fear that the legislation passed by Congress remains more of a bailout than a work out. I fear it undermines the ethic of personal responsibility. I fear that it rewards bad behavior and punishes good. But my greatest fear is that it changes the role of the federal government in our free market economy, which despite its current problems, remains the envy of the world. How can we have capitalism on the way up and socialism on the way down? If we lose our ability to fail will we not in turn lose our ability to succeed? If Congress bails out some firms and sectors, how can it say no to others? We must always be very careful to ensure that any remedy does allow short-term gain to come at the cost of even greater long-term pain – that being the slippery slope to socialism. The thought of my children growing up in America with less freedom and less opportunity is a long-term pain I cannot bear.

Following September 29 House vote, the Dow Jones Industrial Average dropped 777 points in a single day, its largest single-day point drop ever. The House subsequently passed the bill in a second vote on October 3.

On November 19, 2008, Hensarling was appointed by United States House of Representatives Minority Leader John Boehner to serve on the five-member Congressional Oversight Panel created to oversee the implementation of the Emergency Economic Stabilization Act. He was the lone dissenting member on the "Accountability for the Troubled Asset Relief Program" report issued by the panel on January 9, 2009.

== House leadership ==
In 2008, Hensarling was mentioned as a possible candidate for Republican Conference Chairman, then the number three position in the House Republican leadership. However, Hensarling instead endorsed former Republican Study Committee Chairman Mike Pence, a longtime friend and ally. After the 2010 elections, Pence stepped down from the House to run for Governor of Indiana. Hensarling succeeded Pence as Conference Chairman, becoming the fourth-ranking Republican, as the Republican Party had won control of the House of Representatives in 2010. Hensarling stepped down from leadership after the 2012 elections to become Chairman of the House Financial Services Committee.

Prior to Eric Cantor's primary defeat, Hensarling was mentioned as a potential rival to Cantor to succeed John Boehner as leader of the House Republicans.

U.S. House of Representatives
Preceded by Pete Sessions	Member of the U.S. House of Representatives from Texas's 5th congressional district 2003–2019	Succeeded by Lance Gooden
Preceded by Spencer Bachus	Chair of the House Financial Services Committee; 2013–2019	Succeeded by Maxine Waters
Party political offices
Preceded by Mike Pence	Chair of the Republican Study Committee; 2007–2009	Succeeded by Tom Price
Preceded by Mike Pence	Chair of the House Republican Conference; 2011–2013	Succeeded by Cathy McMorris Rodgers
U.S. order of precedence (ceremonial)
Preceded by Silvestre Reyes as Former U.S. Representative	Order of precedence of the United States as Former U.S. Representative	Succeeded by Mike Conaway as Former U.S. Representative
