= Homeowner Flood Insurance Affordability Act of 2014 =

U.S. Law

- Long title: To delay the implementation of certain provisions of the Biggert–Waters Flood Insurance Reform Act of 2012 and to reform the National Association of Registered Agents and Brokers, and for other purposes.
- Announced in: the 113th United States Congress
- Sponsored by: Sen. Robert Menendez (D, NJ)
- Number of co-sponsors: 3

Codification
- Acts affected: Gramm-Leach-Bliley Act, National Flood Insurance Act of 1968, Biggert–Waters Flood Insurance Reform Act of 2012, and others.
- U.S.C. sections affected: 42 U.S.C. § 4014, 5 U.S.C. ch. 5, 42 U.S.C. § 4015, 42 U.S.C. § 4001 et seq., 42 U.S.C. § 4017, and others.
- Agencies affected: United States Congress, United States Senate, Executive Office of the President, United States Department of Justice, Federal Bureau of Investigation, United States Department of the Treasury, Federal Emergency Management Agency
- Authorizations of appropriations: an unlimited amount

Legislative history
- Introduced in the Senate as S. 1926 by Sen. Robert Menendez (D, NJ) on January 14, 2014; Passed the Senate on January 30, 2014 (Roll Call Vote 19: 67–32)

The Homeowner Flood Insurance Affordability Act of 2014 (S. 1926) was a United States Congress bill that would have delayed the increases in flood insurance premiums that were part of the Biggert–Waters Flood Insurance Reform Act of 2012. The reforms from that law were meant to require flood insurance premiums to actually reflect the real risk of flooding, which led to an increase in premiums. At the time of the bill, the National Flood Insurance Program was $24 billion in debt.

The bill passed in the United States Senate during the 113th United States Congress, but was superseded by a similar bill which had originated in the United States House of Representatives. That bill ultimately became law as the Homeowner Flood Insurance Affordability Act of 2013.

== Background ==
=== National Flood Insurance Program ===
The National Flood Insurance Program (NFIP) is a program created by the Congress of the United States in 1968 through the National Flood Insurance Act of 1968 (P.L. 90-448). The program enables property owners in participating communities to purchase insurance protection from the government against losses from flooding. This insurance is designed to provide an insurance alternative to disaster assistance to meet the escalating costs of repairing damage to buildings and their contents caused by floods. The National Flood Insurance Program serves close to 5 million people. When the program began in 1968, there were few private insurers willing to cover floods due to the associated risks. At present, approximately 5.5 million properties are covered by the program, with twenty percent of them receiving discount rates of less than half what a private insurance company would charge them.

According to critics of the program, the government's subsidized insurance plan "encouraged building, and rebuilding, in vulnerable coastal areas and floodplains." Stephen Ellis, of the group taxpayers for Common Sense, points to "properties that flooded 17 or 18 times that were still covered under the federal insurance program" without premiums going up.

=== Biggert–Waters Flood Insurance Reform Act of 2012 ===
The Biggert–Waters Flood Insurance Reform Act of 2012 was "designed to allow premiums to rise to reflect the true risk of living in high-flood areas." The bill was supposed to deal with the "insolvency" of the National Flood Insurance Program by requiring the premiums to reflect real flood risks. The result was a 10 fold increase in premiums. At present, $527 billion worth of property is in the coastal floodplain. The federal government heavily underwrites the flood insurance rates for these areas. The law "ordered FEMA to stop subsidizing flood insurance for second homes and businesses, and for properties that had been swamped multiple times." These changes were to occur gradually over the course of five years. FEMA was also instructed to do a study on the affordability of this process, a study which it has failed to complete.

== Provisions of the bill ==
The bill would delay the flood insurance premium increases mandated under the Biggert–Waters Flood Insurance Reform Act of 2012 for four years. During that time, the Federal Emergency Management Agency is supposed to come up with a plan to make the premiums cheaper and reassess its maps of areas that are likely to flood (and therefore require flood insurance).

In addition to delaying the onset of higher premiums, the bill would allow homeowners who sell their homes to pass the lower flood insurance premiums on to the next homeowner.

== Procedural history ==
The Homeowner Flood Insurance Affordability Act of 2014 was introduced into the United States Senate on January 14, 2014 by Sen. Robert Menendez (D, NJ). Senator Johnny Isakson (R-GA) was the main Republican co-sponsor of the bill. The bill was debated and considered on January 27, 28, and 29th, 2014. On January 30, 2014, the Senate voted in Roll Call Vote 19 to pass the bill 67–32.

The White House originally released a statement opposing the bill, but changed its mind and supported the bill. Speaker of the House John Boehner indicated that that House might consider the Senate bill.

== Debate and discussion ==
Supporters of the bill argue that the delay is necessary for economic reasons. They argue that without the delay, flood insurance premiums will increase so much that many of the home and business owners they apply to will be unable to afford coverage and have to leave. Constituents who use the program or are afraid they will be drawn into a floodplain have called their congresspersons to lobby for this bill.

Opponents object to the delay because the National Flood Insurance Program is already $24 billion in debt and this change would hurt needed reforms to this program. Opponents of undoing the insurance reforms are described as including budget hawks, insurance companies, scientists, and environmentalists.

== Alternative proposals ==
Senator Pat Toomey (R-PA) offered an amendment that would have set up a graduated phase in of a maximum increase of 25% per year. The goal of the amendment was to give people time to change their plans by moving, saving more money, getting errors related to floodplain maps worked out, and so forth. However, the amendment failed 34–65.

Frank Nutter, the president of the Reinsurance Associate of America, suggested pursuing a plan of keeping the scheduled insurance premium increases, but targeting the homeowners that are "most in need, while maintaining the benefits of risk-based rates and incentivizing community and individual mitigation."

Howard Kunreuther favored of keeping the Biggert–Waters reforms. He and his colleagues suggest using a voucher system instead that would help needy people in exchange for them taking action to make their homes safer and less prone to flood damage. Their proposed reforms are explained in the working paper Addressing Affordability in the National Flood Insurance Program.

== See also ==
- List of bills in the 113th United States Congress
- National Flood Insurance Program
- Homeowner Flood Insurance Affordability Act of 2013 (H.R. 3370; 113th Congress)
