= Abel Briones Ruiz =

Mexican drug lord

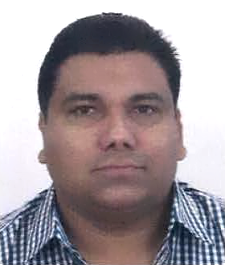
- Born: Abel Briones Ruiz; 31 October 1973 (age 52); Matamoros, Tamaulipas, Mexico
- Other names: Cacho
- Occupation: Business owner
- Employer: Gulf Cartel (suspected)
- Criminal charges: Drug trafficking; Money laundering; Financial structuring
- Criminal status: Fugitive
- Spouse: Myriam Susana Beattie Martínez

Notes
- Wanted by the U.S. District Court for the Southern District of Texas since 2014

Abel Briones Ruiz (born 31 October 1973) is a Mexican business owner and suspected drug trafficker for the Gulf Cartel, a criminal group based in Tamaulipas, Mexico. According to the U.S. District Court for the Southern District of Texas, between 2005 and 2014, Briones Ruiz and his network were responsible for cocaine trafficking from Mexico to the U.S., smuggling the cash proceeds back into Mexico, conducting money laundering from these earnings, and structuring financial activities to hide the illegal nature of his earnings. He did this through his family-run gasoline company, Combustibles Briones, S.A. de C.V. A fugitive from U.S. justice, Briones Ruiz faces up to life imprisonment and up to US$10 million in fines from his drug trafficking activities alone.

== Early life and background ==
Abel Briones Ruiz was born in Matamoros, Tamaulipas, Mexico, on 31 October 1973 to Abel Briones and Magdalena Ruiz Carrión. His birth was registered in Matamoros in 1974. (Note: The information on his birth certificate can be retrieved in the cited source by using his Unique Population Registry Code (CURP), BIRA731031HTSRZB03, along with one of his parents' names.) He is married to Myriam Susana Beattie Martínez. His sister is Claudia Aidé and she is married to Rogelio Nieto González.

Briones Ruiz several hotels and a Matamoros-based gas company, Combustibles Briones, S.A. de C.V., which is located on the highway connecting Matamoros with Reynosa. According to the Public Registry of Property and Commerce (RPPC), Briones Ruiz registered Combustibles Briones, S.A. de C.V. as a commercial entity and listed himself as a commercial business owner in 2009. In an RPPC assembly in 2012, he reported MXN$4.3 million in investments to justify an expansion in his company. That year, Pemex granted a short-term license to Combustibles Briones, S.A. de C.V. to opened up a gas station.

In January 2016, Pemex granted Combustibles Briones, S.A. de C.V. a license to sell their standard and premium gasoline, effectively superseding the short-term license they owned. The licence allowed for Combustibles Briones, S.A. de C.V. to operate for 30 years should they follow the conditions stipulated in the contract. Among the conditions were for Combustibles Briones, S.A. de C.V. to ensure safety regulations, product control standards, insurance requirements, and that financial reports and transactions were kept for record-keeping.

== Career ==
Briones Ruiz, known also by his alias "Cacho", is a suspected drug trafficker of the Gulf Cartel, a criminal group based in Tamaulipas. On 22 October 2014, the U.S. District Court for the Southern District of Texas (S.D. Tex) filed a sealed indictment against Briones Ruiz and three of his collaborators: Beattie Martínez, Nieto González, and an unnamed individual. The indictment was unsealed in court on 18 May 2015. According to the indictment, Briones Ruiz and his network conspired to smuggle with intent to distribute over 5 kg (11 lb) of cocaine from Mexico to the U.S. between 1 January 2005 and 22 October 2014. They were also charged with money laundering and illegal financial structuring.

For the drug charges, they faced from ten years to life imprisonment and up to US$10 million in fines. For the money laundering charges, they faced up to 20 years in prison and up to US$500,000 in fines. In addition, for smuggling drug proceeds internationally, they faced a maximum of 20 years in prison and US$500,000 in fines. Briones Ruiz and his wife were believed to have structured their transactions to hide the nature of their criminal activities; if found guilty, they faced up to ten years in prison and US$500,000 in fines. U.S. authorities were also seeking forfeiture of Nieto González's properties.

Briones Ruiz and the rest of his network are from Matamoros and U.S. authorities believe they are not residing in the U.S. The case against Briones Ruiz and his network was built and prosecuted by Assistant U.S. Attorney Michael Hess. It included information from a joint investigation from the Internal Revenue Service (IRS), Drug Enforcement Administration (DEA), Customs and Border Protection (CBP), Texas Department of Public Safety, Cameron County District Attorney's Office, Cameron County Sheriff's Office, Willacy County Sheriff's Office, and Texas police departments of San Benito, Harlingen, Port Isabel, and Brownsville, across the border from Matamoros.

=== Economic sanctions ===
On 21 May 2015, the Office of Foreign Assets Control (OFAC), a branch of the United States Department of the Treasury, sanctioned Briones Ruiz under the Foreign Narcotics Kingpin Designation Act ("Kingpin Act") for providing support to the international operations of the Gulf Cartel. He is designated as a Specially Designated Narcotics Trafficker (SDNT). The economic sanction extends to four of Briones Ruiz's collaborators: Nieto González, Beattie de Briones, Ruiz Carrión and Claudia Aidé. The sanction also extends to his company, Combustibles Briones, S.A. de C.V. As part of the sanction, the U.S. government prohibited U.S. citizens from engaging in business activities with these entities and individuals, and froze all of their U.S.-based assets.

According to the OFAC, Briones Ruiz and his collaborators are responsible for smuggling cocaine shipments from Mexico to the U.S. Southwestern border. The drugs were distributed in the U.S. states of Texas and Tennessee. The earnings generated by their drug operations were smuggled back into Mexico by Briones Ruiz's network. His network used Combustibles Briones, S.A. de C.V. to launder the Gulf Cartel's proceeds in Mexico and the U.S., where they deposited some of their earnings in Texan bank accounts. They bought multiple properties in Texas but U.S. authorities did not confirm how many. Most of the properties were seized by the U.S. Department of Justice as part of this investigation. Investigators stated that Briones Ruiz is the head of the criminal network and uses his family to further the Gulf Cartel's operations.

The information in the Kingpin Act designation was built by the DEA's field office in Brownsville and the S.D. Tex. If found guilty in a civil court, Briones Ruiz would face up to US$1.075 million in fines per violation. In a criminal court, Briones Ruiz (facing trial as a corporate officer of Combustibles Briones, S.A. de C.V.) would face up to 30 years in prison and up to US$5 million in fines. His corporation can face up to US$10 million in fines if a court determines that it participated in the stimulated charges. Briones Ruiz has an outstanding arrest warrant for his arrest in the U.S.; they have not issued a formal extradition request. Briones Ruiz is considered innocent until proven guilty of the drug offenses through due process.

On 10 July 2019, Mexico's Financial Intelligence Unit (UIF) informed the Attorney General's Office (FGR) of the existence of eight gas stations that were suspected of being involved in money laundering. Among them was Combustibles Briones, S.A. de C.V. The UIF highlighted that Briones Ruiz's company was sanctioned by the OFAC years back. In order to limit their suspected laundering activities, the Mexican government froze all Mexican bank accounts owned by Briones Ruiz, his sister and that of Combustibles Briones, S.A. de C.V. The company was also blocked from being able to generate an official Tax Administration Service (SAT) digital logo, which effectively prevents it from conducting business operations. However, Briones Ruiz and his sister responded by issuing writs of amparo to prevent the government from freezing their bank accounts. In the report, the UIF noted that another of the sanctioned gas companies, KNG Ultra S.A. de C.V. (also known as Ultragas México), made business transactions with Combustibles Briones, S.A. de C.V.

== See also ==
- Mexican drug war
