= Homeowner Flood Insurance Affordability Act of 2013 =

U.S. law

- Long title: To delay the implementation of certain provisions of the Biggert–Waters Flood Insurance Reform Act of 2012, and for other purposes.
- Announced in: the 113th United States Congress
- Sponsored by: Rep. Michael G. Grimm (R, NY-11)
- Number of co-sponsors: 79

Codification
- Acts affected: National Flood Insurance Act of 1968, Biggert–Waters Flood Insurance Reform Act of 2012
- U.S.C. sections affected: 42 U.S.C. § 4014, 42 U.S.C. § 4001 et seq., 42 U.S.C. § 4017, 42 U.S.C. § 4104, 42 U.S.C. § 4015, and others.
- Agencies affected: United States House of Representatives, Executive Office of the President, United States Congress, Federal Emergency Management Agency, United States Senate
- Authorizations of appropriations: an unlimited amount

Legislative history
- Introduced in the House as H.R. 3370 by Rep. Michael G. Grimm (R, NY-11) on October 29, 2013; Committee consideration by United States House Committee on Financial Services, United States House Committee on Rules; Passed the House on March 4, 2014 (House Roll Call Vote 91: 306–91); Passed the Senate on March 13, 2014 (Roll Call Vote 78: 72–22)

The Homeowner Flood Insurance Affordability Act of 2013 (H.R. 3370) is a bill that would reduce some of the reforms made to the federal flood insurance program that were passed two years prior. The bill would reduce federal flood insurance premium rates for some properties that are sold, were uninsured as of July 2012, or where coverage lapsed as a result of the policyholder no longer being required to maintain coverage.

The bill was passed in the United States House of Representatives during the 113th United States Congress. On March 21, 2014, President Barack Obama signed the bill into law, making it Pub. L. 113–89 (text) (PDF).

== Background ==
=== National Flood Insurance Program ===
The National Flood Insurance Program (NFIP) is a program created by the Congress of the United States in 1968 through the National Flood Insurance Act of 1968 (P.L. 90-448). The program enables property owners in participating communities to purchase insurance protection from the government against losses from flooding. This insurance is designed to provide an insurance alternative to disaster assistance to meet the escalating costs of repairing damage to buildings and their contents caused by floods. The National Flood Insurance Program serves close to 5 million people. When the program began in 1968, there were few private insurers willing to cover floods due to the associated risks. At present, approximately 5.5 million properties are covered by the program, with twenty percent of them receiving discount rates of less than half what a private insurance company would charge them.

According to critics of the program, the government's subsidized insurance plan "encouraged building, and rebuilding, in vulnerable coastal areas and floodplains." Stephen Ellis, of the group taxpayers for Common Sense, points to "properties that flooded 17 or 18 times that were still covered under the federal insurance program" without premiums going up. The program's debt increased to $24 billion in part due to Hurricane Katrina in 2005 and Hurricane Sandy in 2012.

=== Biggert–Waters Flood Insurance Reform Act of 2012 ===
The Biggert–Waters Flood Insurance Reform Act of 2012 was "designed to allow premiums to rise to reflect the true risk of living in high-flood areas". The bill was supposed to deal with the increasing debt of the National Flood Insurance Program by requiring the premiums to reflect real flood risks. The result was a 10-fold increase in premiums. At present, $527 billion worth of property is in the coastal floodplain. The federal government heavily underwrites the flood insurance rates for these areas. The law "ordered FEMA to stop subsidizing flood insurance for second homes and businesses, and for properties that had been swamped multiple times." These changes were to occur gradually over the course of five years. FEMA was also instructed to do a study on the affordability of this process, a study which it has failed to complete.

=== The Senate's proposed reforms ===
On January 30, 2014, the United States Senate passed the Homeowner Flood Insurance Affordability Act of 2014 (S. 1926; 113th Congress) to delay the onset of higher premiums, allow homeowners who sell their homes to pass the lower flood insurance premiums on to the next homeowner, and assign FEMA the task of finding a way to make premiums cheaper. The Hill reported that the Senate might be willing move forward with this House bill instead, due to the difficult negotiations over the details of this legislation.

== Provisions of the bill ==
This summary is based largely on the summary provided by the Congressional Research Service, a public domain source.

The Homeowner Flood Insurance Affordability Act of 2013 would prohibit the Administrator of the Federal Emergency Management Agency (FEMA) from: (1) increasing flood insurance risk premium rates to reflect the current risk of flood for certain property located in specified areas subject to a certain mandatory premium adjustment, or (2) reducing such subsidies for any property not insured by the flood insurance program as of July 6, 2012, or any policy that has lapsed in coverage as a result of the policyholder's deliberate choice (Pre-Flood Insurance Rate Map or pre-FIRM properties). The bill would set forth expiration dates for such prohibitions.

The bill would amend the National Flood Insurance Act of 1968 (NFIA) to prohibit the Administrator from providing flood insurance to prospective insureds at rates less than those estimated for any property purchased after the expiration of such six-month period (currently, any property purchased after July 6, 2012).

The bill would direct FEMA to: (1) restore during such six-month period specified estimated risk premium rate subsidies for flood insurance for pre-FIRM properties and properties purchased after such six-month period, and (2) submit to certain congressional committees a draft affordability framework addressing the affordability of flood insurance sold under the National Flood Insurance Program.

The bill would prescribe procedures for expedited congressional consideration of legislation on FEMA affordability authorities.

The bill would permit FEMA to enter into an agreement with another federal agency either to: (1) complete the affordability study, or (2) prepare the draft affordability framework.

The bill would direct FEMA submit to certain congressional committees the affordability study and report.

The bill would amend NFIA to authorize FEMA to reimburse homeowners for successful map appeals.

The bill would make any community that has made adequate progress on the construction (as under current law) or reconstruction (new) of a flood protection system which will afford flood protection for the one-hundred year frequency flood eligible for flood insurance at premium rates not exceeding those which would apply if such flood protection system had been completed.

The bill would revise guidelines governing availability of flood insurance in communities restoring disaccredited flood protection systems to include riverine and coastal levees.

The bill would require FEMA to: (1) rate a covered structure using the elevation difference between the floodproofed elevation of the covered structure and the adjusted base flood elevation of the covered structure; and (2) designate a Flood Insurance Advocate to advocate for the fair treatment of policy holders under the National Flood Insurance Program and property owners in the mapping of flood hazards, the identification of risks from flood, and the implementation of measures to minimize the risk of flood.

== Congressional Budget Office report ==
This summary is based largely on the summary provided by the Congressional Budget Office about the substitute amendment for H.R. 3370 that was posted on February 28, 2014. This is a public domain source.

H.R. 3370 would reduce federal flood insurance premium rates for some properties that are sold, were uninsured as of July 2012, or where coverage lapsed as a result of the policyholder no longer being required to maintain coverage. Excess premiums collected on these policies since the beginning of fiscal year 2014 would be refunded to the policyholder. In addition, H.R. 3370 would limit the amount that the National Flood Insurance Program (NFIP) could increase premium rates for individual policyholders (with some exceptions) and for all policyholders within the same risk classification. The legislation also would place an annual surcharge of $250 for all NFIP policies covering non-residential properties or non-primary residences and $25 for all other policies.

The Congressional Budget Office (CBO) estimates that the surcharges collected under the bill would exceed the costs of reduced premiums over the 2015–2019 period, resulting in a decrease in direct spending of $165 million over that time. Over the subsequent five-year period, additional borrowing (made possible by lower borrowing during the first five years), as well as reduced net income to the program, would increase direct spending by $165 million, resulting in no net effect over the 2015–2024 period.

The change in net income to the NFIP measures the effect of the legislation without regard to borrowing. CBO estimates that the changes proposed by H.R. 3370 would have no significant effect on net income to the NFIP over the 2015–2024 period. Additional receipts generated by annual surcharges collected on all policies would roughly offset the lesser premium collected from some properties.

== Procedural history ==
The Homeowner Flood Insurance Affordability Act of 2013 was introduced into the United States House of Representatives on October 29, 2013 by Rep. Michael G. Grimm (R, NY-11). It was referred to the United States House Committee on Financial Services and the United States House Committee on Rules. On February 29, 2014, House Majority Leader Eric Cantor announced that H.R. 4076 would be considered under a suspension of the rules on March 4, 2014. On March 4, 2014, the House voted in House Roll Call Vote 91 to pass the bill 306-91. Republicans split on the vote, with 121 voting in favor and 86 voting against, while Democrats voted 117–5 in favor. On March 13, 2014, the United States Senate voted in Roll Call Vote 78 by a vote of 72–22. President Barack Obama signed the bill into law on March 21, 2014.

== Debate and discussion ==
One Republican supporter of the bill, Rep. Shelley Moore Capito (R-WV), said that due to the sharply increasing insurance premiums, some people were now faced with the choice "to either spend their life savings on their flood insurance bills or walk away from their house, ruining their credit."

Republicans opposed to the bill were concerned that it would make it more difficult to pay back the billions of dollars of debt owed by the National Flood Insurance Program. Rep. Jeb Hensarling (R-TX) criticized the bill, saying the bill would "postpone actuarially sound rates for perhaps a generation... (and) kill off a key element of risk-based pricing permanently, which is necessary if we are to ever transition to market competition." Hensarling criticized the National Flood Insurance Programs for regularly underestimating flood risk.

Conservative activist group Heritage Action urged its supporters to contact their representatives and tell them to vote no on the bill. The organization criticized the bill because it "forces taxpayers to continue subsidizing high-risk development of flood-prone areas and sets a terrible precedent of never letting positive reform take effect."

One Republican Michigan Congresswoman Candice Miller argued that the state of Michigan should opt out of the National Flood Insurance Program entirely and urged the governor to do so. According to Miller, Michigan residents subsidize other, more flood prone parts of the country, by paying higher premiums than they should. Miller accused insurance premiums of being decided by politics rather than actuarial costs. She said that "too many Americans across this nation are paying rates far below what actual risk would dictate in the marketplace while others, including many who I represent, are being forced to pay into a program that they do not need or want to help subsidize lower rates for other favored groups whose risk is far greater."

== See also ==
- List of bills in the 113th United States Congress
