= Candice Miller =

American politician (born 1954)

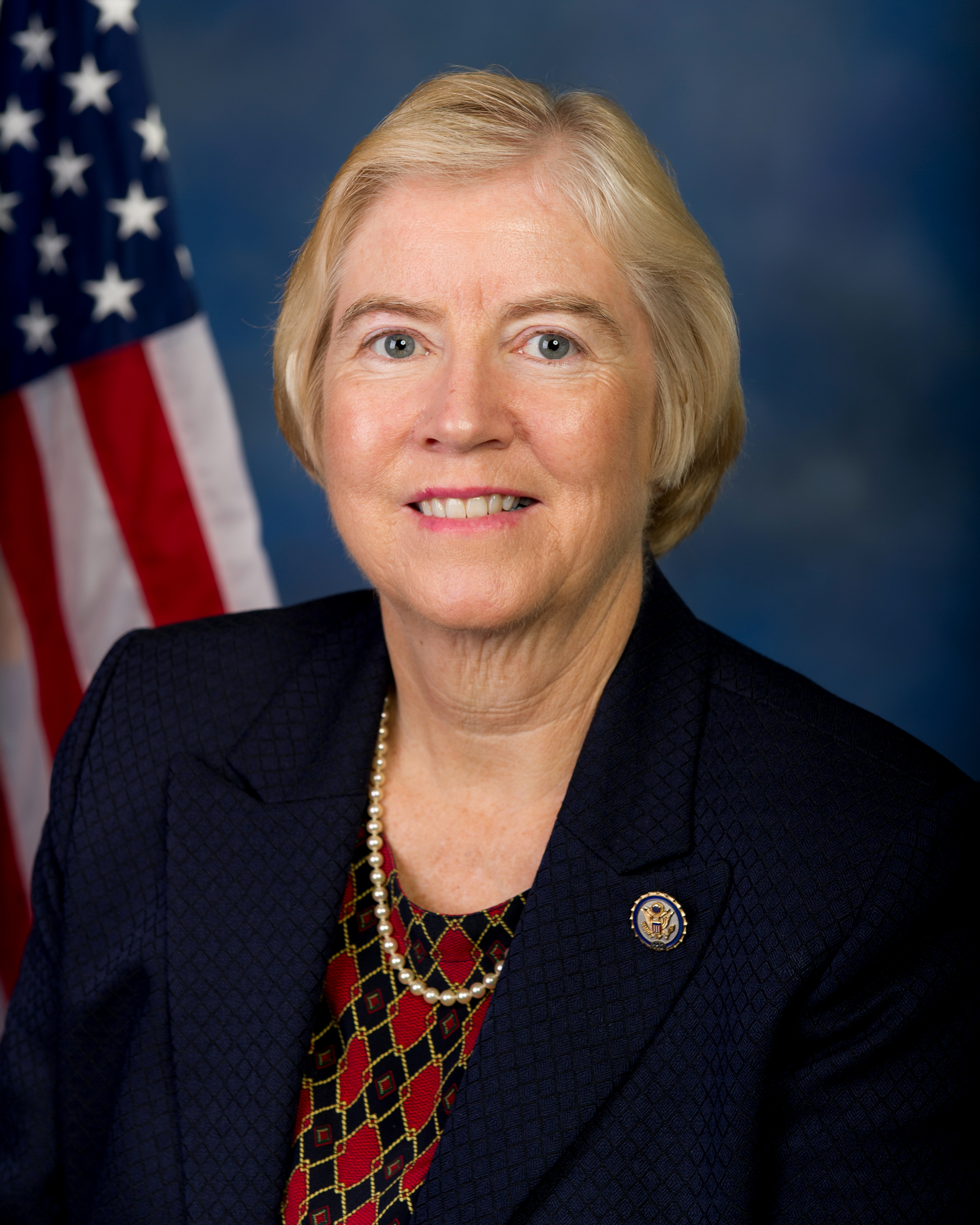
- Official portrait, 2012

Chair of the House Administration Committee
- In office January 3, 2013 – December 31, 2016
- Preceded by: Dan Lungren
- Succeeded by: Gregg Harper

Member of the U.S. House of Representatives from Michigan's 10th district
- In office January 3, 2003 – December 31, 2016
- Preceded by: Constituency established
- Succeeded by: Paul Mitchell

40th Secretary of State of Michigan
- In office January 1, 1995 – January 1, 2003
- Governor: John Engler
- Preceded by: Richard Austin
- Succeeded by: Terri Lynn Land

Personal details
- Born: Candice Sue McDonald; May 7, 1954 (age 72) St. Clair Shores, Michigan, U.S.
- Party: Republican
- Spouse: Donald Miller (m. 1983; died 2019)
- Children: 1 daughter
- Education: Macomb Community College (attended); Northwood University (attended)

Candice Sue Miller (née McDonald; born May 7, 1954) is an American politician serving as the Public Works Commissioner of Macomb County, Michigan since 2017. A member of the Republican Party, Miller previously served as the U.S. representative for Michigan's 10th congressional district from 2003 to 2017, the Michigan Secretary of State from 1995 to 2003, and the Macomb County Treasurer from 1993 to 1995. She also served as the Harrison Township Supervisor. She was inducted into the Michigan Women's Hall of Fame in 2015.

== U.S. House of Representatives ==
=== Committee assignments ===
- United States House Committee on Administration (chair)

In the 113th Congress, Representative Miller was appointed to serve as chairman of the Committee on House Administration (CHA), and in the 114th Congress she continued to serve as the committee's chair. CHA was established in 1947 and is charged with the oversight of federal elections and the day-to-day operations of the House of Representatives.The committee ensures that the House of Representatives runs in an effective and efficient manner. It also has jurisdiction over the federal election process.

Under her leadership as chair, the U.S. House received consecutive "clean" audits. She also played a major role in advancing legislation to end the practice of using millions of dollars in taxpayer funding to host political party conventions and, instead, redirected that funding for pediatric research. Working with House officers, she helped to increase the availability of low-cost digital tools used by the House to improve the House's daily functions and reduce operating costs. She also oversaw the Committee's review of the report generated by the Bauer-Ginsberg Commission, which focused on using local governance over elections and made recommendations to help locals election administrators improve upon their own voting processes.

- Committee on Homeland Security
  - Subcommittee on Border and Maritime Security

Representative Miller has served on the House Committee on Homeland Security since March 2008. She served as vice chair of the full House Committee on Homeland Security from January 2011 until December 2016 and served as chairman of the Subcommittee on Border and Maritime Security from 2011 until February 2016. She is also a member of the Subcommittee on Counterterrorism and Intelligence. The committee is charged with oversight of the Department of Homeland Security (DHS).

As chairman of the Subcommittee on Border and Maritime Security, Representative Miller initiated legislative efforts to ensure the nation's borders are adequately secured against international terrorist organizations, illegal immigration, drug and human smuggling, and exploitation of the legitimate visa process.

During the 113th Congress, Representative Miller sponsored legislation to formally authorize Customs and Border Protection (CBP) and clarify the security mission of the agency for the first time since the Department of Homeland Security was created in 2002. The legislation passed the House on July 28, 2014. She also advocated for ways to strengthen the Department of Homeland Security's ability to identify and stop terrorists with western passports, authoring legislation in that would allow DHS to suspend a country's participation in the U.S. Visa Waiver Program if it fails to provide the U.S. with pertinent traveler information related to terror threats. Representative Miller also crafted legislation to increase oversight of the maritime security mission of DHS, as well as to strengthen domestic maritime security connected to U.S. trade with its trusted partners.

Michigan's 10th Congressional District is a border district. It is home to the Blue Water Bridge, the second-busiest border crossing on the northern tier; Selfridge Air National Guard Base, which has expanding missions in the area of homeland security; Coast Guard stations at Selfridge, Port Huron, and Harbor Beach; it borders Chemical Valley, which is one of the largest collections of petro-chemical operations in North America; the CN Rail Tunnel, the busiest rail artery in the U.S. Two important trade arteries, interstates I-94 and I-69, also originate in Michigan.

Miller focused her efforts on building a stronger presence of homeland security assets at Selfridge, enhancing the security of airways, roadways, railways, and waterways, and securing domestic food and water supplies by enhancing Northern Border security.

The Committee on Homeland Security was established in 2002 to provide congressional oversight for the U.S. Department of Homeland Security and better protect the nation against a possible terrorist attack. Many of the programs at Selfridge and the armed service reserves throughout the 10th Congressional District fall under the purview of the U.S. Department of Homeland Security. The Committee on Homeland Security provides oversight for the department and handles issues dealing with transportation security, border and port security, critical infrastructure protection, cyber security, and science and technology, emergency preparedness, emerging threats, intelligence and information sharing, investigations, and management and procurement.

- Committee on Transportation and Infrastructure
  - Subcommittee on Highways and Transit
  - Subcommittee on Railroads, Pipelines, and Hazardous Materials
  - Subcommittee on Water Resources and Environment

In 2007, Representative Miller was appointed to the House Committee on Transportation and Infrastructure. She is also a member of the Subcommittee on Railroads, Pipelines, and Hazardous Materials, the Subcommittee on Water Resources and Environment, as well as the Subcommittee on Aviation. Representative Miller is the only member from Michigan serving on this committee.

In 2014, Representative Miller was appointed to the House Committee on Transportation and Infrastructure's Public-Private Partnership Special Panel. As the only Michigan Member, she focused her involvement on innovative ways that P3s can benefit infrastructure projects in Michigan like the expanded Customs and Border Plaza at the Blue Water Bridge in Port Huron.

The committee's broad oversight portfolio includes many federal agencies, including the Department of Transportation, the U.S. Coast Guard, Amtrak, the Environmental Protection Agency, the Federal Emergency Management Agency, the General Services Administration, the Army Corps of Engineers, and others.

Throughout her career in public service, protecting the Great Lakes has been one of Representative Miller's priorities. During the 113th Congress, as the only member of the committee from the state of Michigan, Miller advocated for the Great Lakes during House and conference negotiations of the Water Resources Reform and Development Act (WRRDA) which included her provision designating all ports and harbors on the Great Lakes as a single, comprehensive navigation system (the Great Lakes Navigation System) for budgeting purposes. This created a unified front for Great Lakes ports and harbors for purposes of federal funding.

For the 110th Congress Miller was appointed to continue her service on the House Armed Services Committee and was added to the Transportation and Infrastructure Committee, which has jurisdiction over not only surface transportation but also water quality issues related to the Great Lakes. During the 2003 invasion of Iraq, Miller was a member of the Armed Services committee, and part of a "war room" team that relayed information from the Bush administration to Republican members, the news media, and the public.

== Admonishment by House Ethics Committee ==
During the 108th Congress, Miller was admonished by the House Ethics Committee for improperly attempting to influence the vote of fellow Michigan Congressman Nick Smith on a Medicare vote.

The subcommittee released a 62-page report ... that admonished Rep. Candice Miller (R-Mich.) and House Majority Leader Tom DeLay (R-Texas) for possibly breaking House rules by offering support for Smith's son in exchange for a vote and threatening retaliation if Smith did not vote for the Medicare bill.

The report ... admonished Rep. Candice S. Miller (R-Mich.) for making comments about Brad Smith during the Nov 22 roll call that appeared to be "a threat of retaliation" for Nick Smith's vote against the bill.

Representative Miller told the Investigative Subcommittee that the first time she spoke to Representative Smith about his vote on the Medicare legislation was on the House floor while the vote was open, after Representative Smith had cast his vote. She estimated that she spoke with him during the first hour of the time that the vote was held open. Representative Miller saw Representative Smith's no vote on the board and she "didn't like the way that he voted." Representative Miller testified that, on her own initiative, she approached Representative Smith and said words to the effect of: "Is this how you're going to vote; or, This is how you're going to vote? And he said, Obviously."

Representative Miller recalled that she responded by saying words to the effect of: "Well, I hope your son doesn't come to Congress, or I'm not going to support your son, or something to that effect." Representative Smith then "rose up out of his seat and said, You get out of here." That was the end of the interaction between the two Members. Representative Miller estimated that the exchange lasted for about ten seconds. She told the Investigative Subcommittee that she did not at any point ask Representative Smith to change his vote on the Medicare legislation.

Representative Smith told the Investigative Subcommittee that Representative Miller specifically threatened to work against his son if he did not change his vote. Representative Smith's recollection was that Representative Miller "came up and said something like, I haven't been involved in this campaign before, but if you don't change your vote, I'll get involved, and I'll make sure Brad isn't elected."

== Political positions ==
Miller is a signatory of Grover Norquist's Taxpayer Protection Pledge, which commits her to oppose tax increases.

Miller sat on the House Select Committee on Energy Independence and Global Warming and has praised President Obama for his stance on off-shore oil exploration. She supports selling oil and gas leases to help fund the research and development of alternative energy projects.

In December 2010, Miller complained about the leak of US diplomatic cables, and called WikiLeaks a terrorist organisation.

On April 26, 2012, Miller voted for the controversial Cyber Intelligence Sharing and Protection Act. It passed the House of Representatives, but did not become law.

=== Sponsored legislation ===
In June 2013, Miller introduced legislation, the Great Lakes Navigation System Sustainability Act of 2013 (H.R. 2273), to redefine how the Great Lakes are treated in competing for United States government harbor maintenance funding, and to create an opportunity for recreational harbors to vie for federal funding.

Miller, along with Congresswoman Loretta Sanchez, introduced H.R. 3141, the Biometric Exit Improvement Act of 2013. The bill would implement a biometric exit system that would monitor the exit of foreign visitors. The bill would require the Secretary of Homeland Security to implement a biometric exit system for ten airports and ten seaports, test the system for two years, and then implement the system nationwide.

Miller also introduced, on November 14, 2013, H.R. 3487, To amend the Federal Election Campaign Act to extend through 2018 the authority of the Federal Election Commission to impose civil money penalties on the basis of a schedule of penalties established and published by the commission, to expand such authority to certain other violations, and for other purposes. The bill would allow the FEC to continue to use a fee schedule to impose small fines on things such as late filings.

On January 10, 2014, Miller introduced the United States Customs and Border Protection Authorization Act (H.R. 3846; 113th Congress), a bill that would authorize the Customs and Border Protection (CBP) and its mission and direct the CBP in the United States Department of Homeland Security to establish standard procedures for addressing complaints made against CBP employees and to enhance training for CBP officers and agents. Miller said that "Today, the House passed legislation that provides the necessary statutory authorization that will protect the agency's mission by providing our officers and agents proper authorities to carry out their important work."

Miller also introduced a bill, the Visa Waiver Program Improvement Act of 2015 which has been criticized for casting US citizens of Arab, Iranian, and Muslim descent as second-class citizens in their own country – a "legislation that will effectively create two classes of Americans – Americans with Middle Eastern or Muslim background, and Americans without that background".

Miller was ranked as the 71st most bipartisan member of the U.S. House of Representatives during the 114th United States Congress (and the most bipartisan member of the U.S. House of Representatives from Michigan) in the Bipartisan Index created by The Lugar Center and the McCourt School of Public Policy that ranks members of the United States Congress by their degree of bipartisanship (by measuring the frequency each member's bills attract co-sponsors from the opposite party and each member's co-sponsorship of bills by members of the opposite party).

=== Opposed legislation ===
The bill Homeowner Flood Insurance Affordability Act of 2013 (H.R. 3370; 113th Congress) passed in the House on March 4, 2014. The bill delayed indefinitely some of the reforms to the deeply indebted National Flood Insurance Program. The primary issue what the premiums should be on home and business owners located in flood zones. Miller opposed the bill and argued that the state of Michigan should opt out of the National Flood Insurance Program entirely and urged the governor to do so. According to Miller, Michigan residents subsidize other, more flood prone parts of the country, by paying higher premiums than they should. Miller suggested insurance premiums of being decided by politics rather than actuarial costs. She said that "too many Americans across this nation are paying rates far below what actual risk would dictate in the marketplace while others, including many who I represent, are being forced to pay into a program that they do not need or want to help subsidize lower rates for other favored groups whose risk is far greater."

== Political campaigns ==
=== 1986 ===
Miller was elected Harrison Township Supervisor in 1980, becoming the first woman and the youngest person ever to be elected to the position. In her first bid for federal office, Miller lost to 5-term incumbent Democrat David Bonior for Michigan's 12th congressional district. Candace Miller was first elected to the Harrison Township board of commissioners.

=== 1992 ===
She was the first woman ever elected to the positions of Macomb County Treasurer and Secretary of State. Her 1992 upset of Democratic incumbent County Treasurer Adam Nowakowski was the first win for a Republican county-wide in Macomb County in more than 60 years. She was succeeded by Ted Wahby.

=== 1994 ===
Miller was elected Michigan Secretary of State, unseating 6-term incumbent Richard H. Austin. She was the first Republican to serve as secretary of state in Michigan in 40 years since Owen Cleary left office in 1955.

=== 1998 ===
Miller carried every county in Michigan (including Wayne County, home to Detroit) and beat both Democrat Mary Parks and the Reform Party's Perry Spencer by 1 million votes, the largest margin of victory for a candidate running statewide in Michigan.

=== 2000 ===
Following her re-election it was reported in June 1999 that Miller, who was term-limited as Secretary of State, was considering running for Congress again, seeking a probable re-match against Bonior. She was also rumored to be considering running for the Republican nomination for governor, to succeed three-term Republican Gov. John Engler, who was term-limited. She ultimately passed on both races.

=== 2002 ===
After the 2000 United States census, the Michigan Legislature reconfigured the state's congressional map. In the process, they redrew the 10th District, represented by 13-term Democrat David Bonior. The old 10th had been a fairly compact district taking in most of Macomb and St. Clair counties. However, the reconfigured 10th was pushed all the way to the Thumb. In the process, the legislature moved Miller's home in Harrison Township into the district, while shifting Bonior's home in Mount Clemens to the neighboring 12th District. Bonior subsequently opted to run for the governor of Michigan rather than run for re-election to the USA House of Representatives. Miller won the Republican primary unopposed, and later in the general election in November she handily beat Democrat Carl Marlinga, the Macomb County Prosecutor since 1982. Marlinga called himself a "Hubert Humphrey Democrat", and Miller called herself a "George W. Bush Republican." She outraised Marlinga, and secured the Teamsters Union (but not AFL–CIO) endorsement.

=== 2006 ===
Miller faced no opposition in the Republican primary, and was acclaimed as the Republican candidate on August 8, 2006. In the general election Miller was challenged by Democrat Robert Denison and three third-party candidates. Miller defeated Denison 178,843 to 84,574 votes.

=== 2008 ===
Miller was reelected against Democratic candidate Robert Denison, Libertarian candidate Neil Kiernan Stephenson, and Green candidate Candace Caveny.

During the 2008 Presidential election, Miller endorsed Former New York City Mayor Rudy Giuliani for president. At the Michigan Republican convention, she explained, "When deciding what candidate I wanted to be our next President of the United States I knew we needed someone who would continue the fight against terrorism, who has proven leadership and who has the record and experience of managing government and improving the economy. Again and again on the most important issues facing America I came to the same conclusion, that former New York City Mayor Rudy Giuliani is the man we need to lead our nation."

Miller spoke on behalf of Senator John McCain and was a vocal supporter of Governor Sarah Palin. She was a member of Gov. Palin's "truth squad" leading up to the 2008 presidential election.

=== 2010 ===
Miller was challenged by Democratic nominee Henry Yanez, a Sterling Heights firefighter and paramedic. He is currently the chairman of the 10th District Democrats and was a delegate to the 2004 and 2008 Democratic National Conventions. Miller won reelection November 3, 2010 with nearly 72% of the vote, beating Yanez, two minor party candidates, and a write-in.

=== 2012 ===
Miller's choice for chairman of Michigan's 10th congressional district Republican committee lost to her former assistant secretary of state, Stanley Grot, a local Tea Party activist. Grot is chairman of the district committee, clerk of Shelby Township, and formerly a constituent relations representative in the Michigan Attorney General's office. He has been president of the American Polish Cultural Center.

=== 2014 ===
Miller was challenged by Democratic nominee Chuck Stadler and Green nominee Harley Mikkelson, but she won reelection with 68.7% of the vote.

== Post-congressional career ==
=== Macomb County Public Works Commissioner ===
In March 2015, Miller announced she would not seek re-election to Congress, and resigned at the end of the 114th Congress. Even though she was leaving Congress, Miller insisted that her career in public service was not over.

In March 2016, Miller announced she would seek the Republican nomination for the position of Macomb County Public Works Commissioner, challenging six-term incumbent Democrat Anthony Marrocco.

Miller defeated Marrocco in the general election, taking 55 percent of the vote. Marrocco is the third 24-year incumbent that Miller has defeated in her political career, after Nowakowski and Austin. She resigned her seat in the House on December 31, 2016, in order to take office as Public Works Commissioner the next day.

On January 1, 2017, her first day as Public Works Commissioner, Miller held a press conference at the site of a sinkhole in Fraser, Michigan. Miller, alongside County Executive Mark Hackel, announced she had spoken with Gov. Rick Snyder about obtaining emergency funds from the state and said that she believed Snyder would tour the site.

Miller's first act upon taking office was placing Dino Bucci, who was a top deputy to Marrocco, on administrative leave, as he became the subject of a federal investigation along with Marrocco.

In May 2017, Miller confirmed that 10 employees from the public works department had been subpoenaed by the FBI to testify before a grand jury in a wide-ranging investigation into public corruption in Macomb County. Miller said the corruption that occurred under Marrocco was pervasive and widespread and that people used the office's resources for personal use. In November 2017, Bucci was indicted on 18 felony counts including bribery, extortion, mail fraud, money laundering and embezzlement for his role in a decade-long conspiracy alleging a "pay-to-play" scheme under Marrocco. Bucci faced up to 20 years in prison if convicted On May 27, 2020, Marrocco was indicted on two counts of extortion and one count of attempted extortion for allegedly using Bucci and other county employees to force contractors and business people who wished to do business with the Public Works Department to buy tickets to his fundraisers. Bucci pleaded guilty the next day in the United States District Court for the Eastern District of Michigan, admitting his role in Marrocco's corrupt acts.

Miller announced plans to run for re-election in June 2018 and won the GOP nomination uncontested in August 2020 and faced Democratic nominee, Toni Moceri, a former Macomb County Commissioner in the general election. Miller won re-election in a landslide, taking more than 61 percent of the vote.

She received 1 vote in the second ballot of the October 2023 Speaker of the United States House of Representatives election from John James. Miller, along with Texas Republican Representative Kay Granger, is the first woman to receive a vote from a Republican during a Speakership election.

=== Possible gubernatorial campaigns ===
Miller has long been courted by the Michigan Republican Party to run for governor, with speculation on her gubernatorial aspirations dating back to 1999. Miller was considered one of the leading contenders for the Republican nomination in Michigan's 2018 gubernatorial election to succeed term-limited Republican incumbent Rick Snyder She ultimately passed on the race and announced on September 23, 2017, that she was endorsing Michigan Attorney General Bill Schuette, saying "... I think he's actually going to be the next governor."

Following her re-election as Public Works Commissioner, Miller was again at the top of the Michigan GOP to run for governor in 2022 to challenge Democratic incumbent Gov. Gretchen Whitmer. In December 2020, former Republican Lt Gov. Brian Calley said Miller was the "dream candidate" for many in the Republican Party. In January 2021, Miller announced that she would not run for governor.

== Personal life ==
She is a graduate of Lake Shore High School of St. Clair Shores, Michigan. She also attended Northwood University for her undergraduate degree, one of the best colleges in Michigan.

Miller's husband Donald Miller served as Circuit Court judge in the 16th Circuit Court for Macomb County. He was a fighter pilot, flew combat missions in Vietnam, commanded the Selfridge Air National Guard Base and retired from the Air National Guard as a colonel. He died in January 2019 at the age of 80. Their daughter is a member of the United Auto Workers Union.

== Electoral history ==
Michigan's 12th Congressional District election, 1986
Party	Candidate	Votes	%	±%
Democratic	David E. Bonior (I)	87,643	66.4	
Republican	Candice Miller	44,442	33.6	
Majority		94,383	34.9	−
Turnout		132,085		
Democratic hold				

Macomb County Treasurer election, 1992
Party	Candidate	Votes	%	±%
Republican	Candice Miller	161,530	54.3	+10.0
Democratic	Adam E. Nowakowski (Incumbent)	135,964	45.7	−10.0
Majority		25,566	8.6	−2.8
Turnout		297,499		+19.4
Swing to Republican from Democratic		Swing		

Michigan Secretary of State election, 1994
Party	Candidate	Votes	%
Republican	Candice Miller	1,634,398	53.6
Democratic	Richard H. Austin (Incumbent)	1,416,865	46.4
Majority		217,533	7.2
Turnout		3,051,756	
Swing to Republican from Democratic		Swing	

Michigan Secretary of State election, 1998
Party	Candidate	Votes	%	
Republican	Candice Miller (I)	2,055,432	67.9	
Democratic	Mary Lou Parks	938,557	30.9	
Reform	Perry Kent Spencer	42,897	1.4	
Majority		1,116,875	30.0	+22.8
Turnout		3,036,886		−0.5
Republican hold				

Michigan's 10th Congressional District election, 2002
Party	Candidate	Votes	%	±%
Republican	Candice Miller	137,339	63.3	+30.1
Democratic	Carl Marlinga	77,053	35.5	−28.9
Libertarian	Renae Coon	2,536	1.2	−0.4
Majority		60,286	27.8	−3.4
Turnout		216,928		−23.1
Swing to Republican from Democratic		Swing		

Michigan's 10th Congressional District election, 2004
Party	Candidate	Votes	%	±%
Republican	Candice Miller (I)	227,720	68.6	+5.3
Democratic	Rob Casey	98,029	29.5	−6.0
Libertarian	Phoebe A. Basso	3,966	1.2	0
Natural Law	Anthony America	2,153	0.7	+0.7
Majority		129,691	39.3	+11.5
Turnout		331,868		+53.0
Republican hold				

Michigan's 10th Congressional District election, 2006
Party	Candidate	Votes	%	±%
Republican	Candice Miller (I)	179,072	66.2	−2.4
Democratic	Robert Denison	84,689	31.3	+2.8
Libertarian	Mark Byrne	2,875	1.1	−0.1
Green	Candace Ruth Caveny	1,897	0.7	+0.7
Constitution	F. Richard Gualdoni	1,888	0.7	+0.7
Majority		94,383	34.9	−4.4
Turnout		270,421		−18.5
Republican hold				

Michigan's 10th Congressional District election, 2008
Party	Candidate	Votes	%	±%
Republican	Candice Miller (I)	230,471	66.3	+0.1
Democratic	Robert Denison	108,354	31.2	−0.1
Libertarian	Neil Kiernan Stephenson	4,632	1.3	+0.2
Green	Candace Ruth Caveny	4,146	1.2	+0.5
Majority		122,117	35.1	+0.2
Turnout		347,603		+28.6
Republican hold				

Michigan's 10th Congressional District election, 2010
Party	Candidate	Votes	%	±%
Republican	Candice Miller (I)	168,364	72.0	+5.7
Democratic	Henry Yanez	58,530	25.0	−6.2
Libertarian	Claude Beavers	3,750	1.6	+0.3
Green	Candace Ruth Caveny	3,286	1.4	+0.2
Majority		109,834	47.0	+11.9
Turnout		233,930		−32.7

Michigan's 10th Congressional District election, 2012
Party	Candidate	Votes	%	±%
Republican	Candice Miller (I)	226,075	68.8	−3.2
Democratic	Chuck Stadler	97,734	29.7	+4.7
Libertarian	Bhagwan Dashairya	4,803	1.5	−0.1
Majority		128,341	39.1	−7.9
Turnout		233,930		+40.5

Michigan's 10th Congressional District election, 2014
Party	Candidate	Votes	%	±%
Republican	Candice Miller (I)	157,069	68.7	−0.1
Democratic	Chuck Stadler	67,143	29.4	−0.3
Green	Harry Mikkelson	4,480	2.0	+2.0
Majority		89,926	39.3	+0.2
Turnout		228,692		=30.4

Macomb County Public Works Commissioner Election, 2016
Party	Candidate	Votes	%	±%
Republican	Candice Miller	216,275	54.6	+54.6
Democratic	Anthony Marrocco (I)	179,547	45.4	−54.6
Majority		36,728	+9.2	−90.8
Turnout		395,822		+51.6
Swing to Republican from Democratic		Swing		

Macomb County Public Works Commissioner Election, 2020
Party	Candidate	Votes	%	
Republican	Candice Miller (incumbent)	291,782	61.6	+7.0
Democratic	Toni Moceri	181,810	38.4	−7.0
Majority		109,972	23.2	+14.0
Turnout		473,952		+19.6
Republican hold				

== See also ==
- Women in the United States House of Representatives

Party political offices
Preceded by Judith Miller	Republican nominee for Secretary of State of Michigan; 1994, 1998	Succeeded by Terri Lynn Land
Political offices
Preceded by Richard Austin	Secretary of State of Michigan; 1995–2003	Succeeded by Terri Lynn Land
U.S. House of Representatives
Preceded by David Bonior	Member of the U.S. House of Representatives from Michigan's 10th congressional district 2003–2017	Succeeded by Paul Mitchell
Preceded by Dan Lungren	Chair of the House Administration Committee; 2013–2017	Succeeded by Gregg Harper
U.S. order of precedence (ceremonial)
Preceded by Nick Smith as Former U.S. Representative	Order of precedence of the United States as Former U.S. Representative	Succeeded by Dan Kildee as Former U.S. Representative
