= Flood insurance rate map =

A flood insurance rate map (FIRM) is an official map of a community within the United States that displays the floodplains, more explicitly special hazard areas and risk premium zones, as delineated by the Federal Emergency Management Agency (FEMA). The term is used mainly in the United States but similar maps exist in many other countries, such as Australia.

== Uses ==
FIRMs display areas that fall within the 100-year flood boundary. Areas that fall within the boundary are called special flood hazard areas (SFHAs) and they are further divided into insurance risk zones. The term 100-year flood indicates that the area has a one-percent chance of flooding in any given year, not that a flood will occur every 100 years.

Such maps are used in town planning, in the insurance industry, and by individuals who want to avoid moving into a home at risk of flooding or to know how to protect their property. FIRMs are used to set rates of insurance against risk of flood and whether buildings are insurable at all against flood. It is similar to a topographic map, but is designed to show floodplains. Towns and municipalities use FIRMs to plan zoning areas. Most places will not allow construction in a flood way.

== Creation process ==
In the United States the FIRM for each town is occasionally updated. At that time a preliminary FIRM will be published, and available for public viewing and comment. FEMA sells the official FIRMs, called community kits, as well as an updating access service to the maps. There are also some companies that sell software to locate land parcels or real estate on digitized FIRMs. These FIRMs are used in identifying whether a land or building is in flood zone and, if so, which of the different flood zones are in effect.

In 2004, FEMA began a project to update and digitize the flood plain maps at a yearly cost of $200 million. The new maps usually take around 18 months to go from a preliminary release to the final product. During that time period FEMA works with local communities to determine the final maps.

== Louisiana and FEMA ==
In early 2014, two congressmen from Louisiana, Bill Cassidy and Steve Scalise, asked FEMA to consider the width of drainage canals, water flow levels, drainage improvements, pumping stations and computer models when deciding the final flood insurance rate maps.

== See also ==
- National Flood Insurance Program
- Floodplain
- Special Flood Hazard Area
