= Flood Insurance Reform Act of 2004 =

Bunning-Bereuter-Blumenauer Flood Insurance Reform Act of 2004
- Long title: An Act to amend the National Flood Insurance Act of 1968 to reduce losses to properties for which repeated flood insurance claim payments have been made, and for other purposes.
- Enacted by: the 108th United States Congress

Citations
- Public law: Pub. L. 108–264 (text) (PDF)
- Statutes at Large: 118 Stat. 712

Codification
- Acts amended: National Flood Insurance Act of 1968

Legislative history
- Introduced in the Senate as S. 2238 by Jim Bunning on March 25, 2004; Committee consideration by Banking, Housing, and Urban Affairs; Passed the Senate on June 15, 2004 (Unanimous consent); Passed the House on June 21, 2004 (Voice vote); Signed into law by President George W. Bush on June 30, 2004

The Bunning-Bereuter-Blumenauer Flood Insurance Reform Act of 2004 (Pub. L. 108–264 (text) (PDF)) reformed the National Flood Insurance Program (NFIP) and the terms of the National Flood Insurance Act of 1968. It was designed to "reduce losses to properties for which repetitive flood insurance claim payments have been made." The Act's main sponsors were Sen. Jim Bunning, Rep. Doug Bereuter, and Rep. Earl Blumenauer.

The Act's preamble included the following Congressional findings that quantify the motivation for the new law:

- the NFIP insures approximately 4,400,000 policyholders;
- about 48,000 properties in the program have experienced, within a ten-year period, two or more flood losses where each loss is more than $1,000;
- about 10,000 repetitive-loss properties have experienced two or three losses that cumulatively exceed building value;
- these repetitive-loss properties cost the taxpayer about $200 million annually;
- about 1% of insured properties account for 25-30% of claims losses;
- the vast majority of repetitive-loss properties were built before the 1974 implementation of floodplain management standards created under the original program and thus are eligible for subsidized flood insurance.

When introduced in the House on January 8, 2003, the bill was called the Two Floods and You Are Out of the Taxpayers' Pocket Act of 2003.
