= H.R. 3487 (113th Congress) =

- Long title: To amend the Federal Election Campaign Act to extend through 2018 the authority of the Federal Election Commission to impose civil money penalties on the basis of a schedule of penalties established and published by the Commission, to expand such authority to certain other violations, and for other purposes.
- Announced in: the 113th United States Congress
- Sponsored by: Rep. Candice S. Miller (R, MI-10)
- Number of co-sponsors: 8

Codification
- Acts affected: Federal Election Campaign Act of 1971
- U.S.C. sections affected: 2 U.S.C. § 437g

Legislative history
- Introduced in the House as H.R. 3487 by Rep. Candice S. Miller (R, MI-10) on November 14, 2013; Committee consideration by United States House Committee on House Administration; Passed the House on November 18, 2013 (voice vote)

The bill H.R. 3487 has the long title "to amend the Federal Election Campaign Act to extend through 2018 the authority of the Federal Election Commission (FEC) to impose civil money penalties on the basis of a schedule of penalties established and published by the Commission, to expand such authority to certain other violations, and for other purposes." The bill would allow the FEC to continue to use a fee schedule to impose small fines on things such as late filings.

The bill was introduced into the United States House of Representatives during the 113th United States Congress. It passed the House on November 18, 2013, by voice vote.

== Provisions of the bill ==
This summary is based largely on the summary provided by the Congressional Research Service, a public domain source.

H.R. 3487 would amend the Federal Election Campaign Act of 1971 to extend through December 31, 2018, the authority of the Federal Election Commission (FEC) to impose civil money penalties on the basis of a schedule of penalties fit has established and published. The bill would apply such penalties to violations of qualified campaign contribution and expenditure disclosure requirements.

== Procedural history ==
H.R. 3487 was introduced into the United States House of Representatives on November 14, 2013, by Rep. Candice Miller (R-MI). It was referred to the United States House Committee on House Administration. On November 15, 2013, House Majority Leader Eric Cantor announced that the bill would be considered under a suspension of the rules on November 18, 2013. It passed the House on November 18, 2013, by voice vote.

== See also ==
- List of bills in the 113th United States Congress
- Federal Election Commission
