= Special Flood Hazard Area =

A Special Flood Hazard Area (SFHA) is an area identified by the United States Federal Emergency Management Agency (FEMA) as an area with a special flood or mudflow, and/or flood related erosion hazard, as shown on a flood hazard boundary map or flood insurance rate map. Areas within the SFHA are designated on the flood insurance rate map as Zone A, AO, A1-A30, AE, A99, AH, AR, AR/A, AR/AE, AR/AH, AR/AO, AR/A1-A30, V1-V30 or V.

Land areas that are at high risk for flooding are called special flood hazard areas (SFHAs), or floodplains. These areas are indicated on flood insurance rate maps (FIRMs).

In high-risk areas, there is at least a 1 in 4 chance of flooding during a 30-year mortgage.
