= United States Customs and Border Protection Authorization Act =

- Long title: To provide for the authorization of border, maritime, and transportation security responsibilities and functions in the Department of Homeland Security and the establishment of United States Customs and Border Protection, and for other purposes.
- Announced in: the 113th United States Congress
- Sponsored by: Rep. Candice S. Miller (R, MI-10)
- Number of co-sponsors: 2

Codification
- Acts affected: Homeland Security Act of 2002, Security and Accountability for Every Port Act of 2006
- U.S.C. sections affected: 6 U.S.C. § 101 et seq., 6 U.S.C. § 234, 6 U.S.C. § 212, 6 U.S.C. § 238, 6 U.S.C. § 213, and others.
- Agencies affected: Commissioner of Customs, Transportation Security Administration, Department of Homeland Security Office of Inspector General, U.S. Customs and Border Protection, U.S. Immigration and Customs Enforcement, Federal Bureau of Investigation, Department of Homeland Security

Legislative history
- Introduced in the House as H.R. 3846 by Rep. Candice S. Miller (R, MI-10) on January 10, 2014; Committee consideration by United States House Committee on Homeland Security, United States House Committee on Ways and Means, United States House Homeland Security Subcommittee on Border and Maritime Security; Passed the House on July 28, 2014 (voice vote)

The United States Customs and Border Protection Authorization Act (H.R. 3846) is a bill that would authorize the Customs and Border Protection (CBP) and its mission and direct the CBP in the United States Department of Homeland Security to establish standard procedures for addressing complaints made against CBP employees and to enhance training for CBP officers and agents.

The bill was introduced into the United States House of Representatives during the 113th United States Congress.

== Background ==
U.S. Customs and Border Protection (CBP) is the largest federal law enforcement agency of the United States Department of Homeland Security charged with regulating and facilitating international trade, collecting import duties, and enforcing U.S. regulations, including trade, customs, and immigration. CBP is the largest law enforcement agency in the United States. Over 44,000 law enforcement officers work for the CBP. It has its headquarters in Washington, D.C.

== Provisions of the bill ==
This summary is based largely on the summary provided by the Congressional Research Service, a public domain source.

The United States Customs and Border Protection Authorization Act would amend the Homeland Security Act of 2002 with respect to the establishment in the United States Department of Homeland Security (DHS) of the U.S. Customs and Border Protection.

== Congressional Budget Office report ==
This summary is based largely on the summary provided by the Congressional Budget Office, as ordered reported by the House Committee on Homeland Security on June 11, 2014. This is a public domain source.

H.R. 3846 would direct Customs and Border Protection (CBP) in the United States Department of Homeland Security to establish standard procedures for addressing complaints made against CBP employees and to enhance training for CBP officers and agents. The bill also would require the agency to prepare several minor reports for the Congress on a variety of issues, including the characteristics of CBP procurement personnel, infrastructure needs at ports of entry, and the problem of unaccompanied children apprehended at U.S. borders.

Based on the cost of similar activities, the Congressional Budget Office (CBO) estimates that implementing H.R. 3846 would cost about $1 million in fiscal year 2015 and less than $500,000 annually thereafter, from appropriated funds, mostly for the required reports. According to CBP, much of the information needed for those reports has already been compiled. Enacting the legislation would not affect direct spending or revenues; therefore, pay-as-you-go procedures do not apply. H.R. 3846 contains no intergovernmental or private-sector mandates as defined in the Unfunded Mandates Reform Act and would not affect the budgets of state, local, or tribal governments.

== Procedural history ==
The United States Customs and Border Protection Authorization Act was introduced into the United States House of Representatives by Rep. Candice S. Miller (R, MI-10). The bill was referred to the United States House Committee on Homeland Security, the United States House Committee on Ways and Means, and the United States House Homeland Security Subcommittee on Border and Maritime Security. On July 24, 2014 the bill was reported (amended) alongside House Report 113-555 part 1. On July 28, 2014, the House voted to pass the bill in a voice vote.

== Debate and discussion ==
The US-Mexico Border Mayors Association supported the bill, with executive director John Cook writing that they were "heartened by Congressional steps these past few weeks to formally authorize the security functions of the U.S. Custom and Border Protection." According to Cook, in Texas "nearly half a million jobs rely on the $86 billion of trade with Mexico," but delays occurring at the border "cost 26,000 U.S. jobs and $6 billion in lost economic output" because of "inadequate and outdated port infrastructure and significant staffing gaps within CBP." H.R. 3846 would help fix this. Cook did argue that the act could be strengthened by including additional training for border agents and building a better way for stakeholders to communicate with the CBP.

Rep. Michael McCaul (R-TX) said that he was "pleased the House has passed the US Customs and Border Protection Authorization Act, which will authorize the CBP for the first time ever."

Rep. Candice Miller, who introduced the bill, said that "Today, the House passed legislation that provides the necessary statutory authorization that will protect the agency's mission by providing our officers and agents proper authorities to carry out their important work."

== See also ==
- List of bills in the 113th United States Congress
- Children's immigration crisis
