= Taxpayer Choice Act =

The Taxpayer Choice Act (H.R. 3818/S. 2416) was a bill in the United States Congress which, if enacted, would have amended the Internal Revenue Code to eliminate the alternative minimum tax on individual taxpayers. The bill was reproposed in 2009. The bill was not voted upon in either session. The legislation would create an alternative, simplified tax that individuals may choose over the current personal income tax. The new system would have two tax rates (up to $100K at 10% and 25% for everything above), a large standard deduction with no special deductions, and is argued to greatly reduce the damage and complexity caused by the current income tax. The bill would also make permanent the capital gains and dividends rate reductions enacted by the Jobs and Growth Tax Relief Reconciliation Act. In the House, the bill was introduced by Rep. Paul Ryan (R-WI), ranking member on the House Budget Committee, and had 83 cosponsors in 2007 and 22 fellow Republicans in 2009. The bill was introduced in the Senate by Jim Demint. The plan has been supported by FreedomWorks, former House Majority Leader Dick Armey, and former 2008 presidential candidate Fred Thompson.

== See also ==
- Alternative Minimum Tax
- Income tax in the United States
- Taxation in the United States
- Tax reform
