= Coastal Barrier Resources Act =

- Long title: An Act to protect and conserve fish and wildlife resources, and for other purposes.
- Acronyms (colloquial): CBRA
- Nicknames: Coastal Barrier Resources Act of 1982
- Enacted by: the 97th United States Congress
- Effective: October 18, 1982

Citations
- Public law: Pub. L. 97–348
- Statutes at Large: 96 Stat. 1653

Codification
- Titles amended: 16 U.S.C.: Conservation
- U.S.C. sections created: 16 U.S.C. ch. 55 § 3501 et seq.

Legislative history
- Introduced in the Senate as S. 1018 by John Chafee (R–RI) on April 28, 1981; Committee consideration by Senate Environment and Public Works, House Merchant Marine and Fisheries, House Banking, Finance, and Urban Affairs, House Public Works and Transportation; Passed the Senate on September 23, 1982 (Passed Voice Vote); Passed the House on September 24, 1982 (399-4, in lieu of H.R. 3252); Reported by the joint conference committee on October 1, 1982; agreed to by the Senate on October 1, 1982 (Agreed) and by the House on October 1, 1982 (Agreed); Signed into law by President Ronald Reagan on October 18, 1982

Major amendments
- P.L. 100-707, 102 Stat. 4689, H.R. 2707, 1988; P.L. 101-591, 104 Stat. 2931, H.R. 2840, 1990; P.L. 106-167, 113 Stat. 1803, S. 1866, 1999; P.L. 106-514, 114 Stat. 2394, S. 1752, 2000; P.L. 109-226, 120 Stat. 381, S. 1869, 2006; P.L. 115-358, 132 Stat. 5078, H.R. 5787, 2018

The Coastal Barrier Resources Act (CBRA, Public Law 97-348) of the United States was enacted into law by the 40th President of the United States Ronald Reagan on October 18, 1982. The United States Congress passed this Act in order to address the many problems associated with coastal barrier development. CBRA designated various undeveloped coastal barriers, which were illustrated by a set of maps adopted by law, to be included in the John H. Chafee Coastal Barrier Resources System (CBRS). These designated areas were made ineligible for both direct and indirect federal expenditures and financial assistance, which are believed to encourage development of fragile, high-risk, and ecologically sensitive coastal barriers.

CBRA was originally authored by U.S. Representative Thomas B. Evans, Jr. and Senator John Chafee, who kept three objectives in mind: 1) to minimize the loss of human life by discouraging development in high risk areas vulnerable to storm surges and hurricane winds; 2) to reduce wasteful expenditure of federal resources; and 3) to protect the natural resources associated with undeveloped coastal barriers.

== Undeveloped coastal barriers ==
Coastal barriers are landscape features that protect the mainland, lagoons, wetlands and salt marshes from the full force of wind, wave and tidal energy. “Undeveloped coastal barriers” are defined by the CBRA to include barrier islands, bars, spits, and tombolos, along with associated aquatic habitats, such as adjacent estuaries and wetlands. Composed of sand and other loose sediments, these elongated, narrow landforms are dynamic ecosystems and are vulnerable to hurricane damage and shoreline recession. Coastal barriers also provide important habitat for a variety of wildlife, and are an important recreational resource.

The Coastal Barrier Resources Reauthorization Act of 2000 (Public Law 106-514) provided specifications for determining if an area was undeveloped at the time it was included within the CBRS, and ordered the development of a Digital Mapping Pilot Project for between 50 and 75 CBRS areas for the purpose of information precision and accessibility. If some portion of a barrier landform is developed, the remaining undeveloped portion may be included in the CBRS.

== U.S. Fish and Wildlife Service Role ==
The United States Department of the Interior, through the United States Fish and Wildlife Service (Service), was named the primary authority in the implementation of this Act, and may approve the use of subsidies for such uses as emergency assistance, national security, navigability, fish and wildlife research, and energy exploration.

Other Service responsibilities for administrating the CBRA include:

• Maintaining the official maps of the CBRS and providing copies for public viewing at USFWS headquarters, regional, and field office locations;

• Maintaining the administrative record for each CBRS unit;

• Consulting with federal agencies to determine whether federal funds may be spent within designated CBRS areas;

• Determining whether properties lay within CBRS boundaries;

• Reviewing and modifying the CBRS every five years to reflect geomorphic changes such as erosion and accretion; and

• Working with Congress, landowners, and other interested parties when questions concerning the correct application of CBRS boundaries

== Designated and Protected Areas ==
Initially, CBRA consisted of 186 units totaling 666 miles (1,072 km) of shoreline and 452,834 acres (1,833 km^{2}) of undeveloped, unprotected coastal barriers on the Atlantic Ocean and Gulf of Mexico coasts. Shortly following its enactment, Congress passed the Great Lakes Coastal Barrier Act (Public Law 100-707), which required the Secretary of the Interior to identify additional System units along the Great Lakes. The Secretary identified and recommended for inclusion in the System 112 Great Lakes units totaling 30,150 acres (122 km^{2}).

The Act was amended in 1990 by the Coastal Barrier Improvement Act (CBIA, Public Law 101-591) to include the designation of otherwise protected areas (OPAs), which applies to the national, state and local areas that include coastal barriers held for conservation or recreation. Examples of OPAs include National Wildlife Refuges, national parks and seashores, state parks, and lands owned by private organizations for conservation purposes.

The CBIA expanded existing CBRS units, and created new units and OPAs along the Great Lakes, Puerto Rico, the Florida Keys, the U.S. Virgin Islands, and secondary barriers within large embayments. Additionally, CBIA required the Secretary to prepare a report on Pacific Coast coastal barriers. This report has never been submitted to the Congress, and no Pacific coast barrier units have been included in the System.

The CBRS currently includes 585 System units, which add up to approximately 1,300,000 acres (5,300 km^{2}) of land and associated aquatic habitat. Additionally, there are 271 OPAs, which comprise nearly 1,800,000 acres (7,300 km^{2}) of land and associated aquatic habitat, which are protected by CBRA. CBRS areas now extend along the coasts of the Atlantic Ocean and the Gulf of Mexico, as well as Puerto Rico, the U.S. Virgin Islands, and the Great Lakes.

== Modification of boundaries ==
According to the Act, only Congress has the power to modify boundaries of the CBRS through legislation. The one exception to this rule is a five-year review of the CBRS conducted by the Service that modifies boundaries only to reflect changes due to natural processes such as accretion and erosion. Since the establishment of the CBRS in 1982, several pieces of legislation have removed land from the CBRS, making it available to federal subsidies for development.

Congress determined the initial CBRS units in 1982, and modified and expanded the CBRS in 1990. Subsequent modifications to the CBRS have since been made via Congressional action. If a technical mapping error warranting a change in any single part of the CBRS map is found by the Service, all adjacent areas must be reviewed to ensure the map’s accuracy. This is a comprehensive approach to map revisions that treats all landowners who may be affected equitably, and ensures that Congress will not have to remap the same area in the future. While this may be an extensive process, it allows the Service to uphold the integrity of the entire CBRS by looking at boundary revisions in a holistic manner instead of pursuing incremental fixes for individual areas on a single map.

== Map modernization ==
On April 7, 2009, the U.S. Fish and Wildlife Service (Service) released to the public its Report to Congress: John H. Chafee Coastal Barrier Resources System Digital Mapping Pilot Project and announced the start of a 90-day public comment period. The report, which was directed by the Coastal Barrier Resources Reauthorization Act of 2000 (P.L. 106-514), highlights the benefits of updating Coastal Barrier Resources System (CBRS) maps with more accurate and precise digital maps to better protect people, coastal areas and natural resources. The report includes draft revised maps for 70 units, or approximately 10 percent of the entire CBRS, and a framework for modernizing the remainder of the maps. The 70 pilot project units are located in Delaware, North Carolina, South Carolina, Florida and Louisiana. On June 29, 2009, the Service announced a 30-day extension of the public comment period. The public comment period closed on August 5, 2009.

== Accomplishments ==
Since limiting federally subsidized development on designated coastal barriers, CBRA has managed to save federal dollars, protect humans by keeping them out of the path of deadly storm surges, and conserve valuable coastal habitat for fish and other wildlife.

Since its enactment, CBRA has been promoted as a fiscally conservative, free-market approach to encourage coastal conservation. In no way does the Act regulate how individuals develop their land on and around areas of coastal barrier. Instead, it directs that federal dollars not be spent for development purposes on designated coastal barriers. Therefore, the full cost of development and rebuilding is transferred from American taxpayers to the individuals who choose to live and build in such hazard-prone areas.

An economic study conducted by the USFWS in 2002 estimated that by 2010, CBRA will have saved American taxpayers nearly $1.3 billion by restricting federal spending for roads, wastewater systems, potable water supply, and disaster relief.

== Sources ==
- US Fish and Wildlife Service: Legislation
- US Fish and Wildlife Service: Coastal Barrier Resource System
