= Taxpayers for Common Sense =

US federal budget watchdog organization

Taxpayers for Common Sense (TCS) is a nonpartisan federal budget watchdog organization based in Washington, D.C., in the United States. TCS is a 501(c)(3) non-profit organization; its 501(c)(4) affiliate is Taxpayers for Common Sense Action (TCS Action). The current president of TCS is Stephen Ellis. Founded in 1995 by Jill Lancelot and Rafael DeGennaro, TCS states that its mission is to ensure that the federal government spends taxpayer money efficiently and responsibly.

In 2000, former United States Senator William Proxmire asked Taxpayers for Common Sense to revive the Golden Fleece Award, which was awarded to federal programs that most Americans would agree were wasteful. The first revived Golden Fleece was awarded to the Federal Aviation Administration for allowing the local governmental authority operating Tampa International Airport to lease non-aviation airport property to commercial interests at below then-market rates.

TCS creates databases of the earmarks that appear in congressional spending bills. TCS is credited with labeling the Gravina Island Bridge proposal in Ketchikan, Alaska, as the "Bridge to Nowhere". The project received a $223 million earmark in 2005 and was later cancelled on September 21, 2007.

During the 2020 COVID-19 pandemic, the group received $178,500 in federally backed small business loan from Citibank as part of the Paycheck Protection Program. TCS said it was the first time they had accepted government money.
