= Child Abuse Prevention and Treatment Act =

1988 United States federal law

- Long title: An Act to provide financial assistance for a demonstration program for the prevention, identification, and treatment of child abuse and neglect, to establish a National Center on Child Abuse and Neglect, and for other purposes.
- Acronyms (colloquial): CAPTA
- Enacted by: the 93rd United States Congress

Citations
- Public law: Pub. L. 93–247
- Statutes at Large: 88 Stat. 4

Codification
- Titles amended: 42 U.S.C. § 5101 et seq.

Legislative history
- Introduced in the Senate as S. 1191 by Walter F. Mondale (D–MN) on March 13, 1973; Committee consideration by Senate Labor and Public Welfare; House Education and Labor; Passed the Senate on July 14, 1973 (57–7); Passed the House of Representatives on December 3, 1973 (354–36); Agreed to by the Senate on December 20, 1973 (Senate agreed to House amendments with an amendment); Signed into law by President Richard Nixon on January 31, 1974

The Child Abuse Prevention and Treatment Act (Public Law 93–247) of 1988 provides financial assistance for demonstration programs for the prevention, identification, and treatment of child abuse and neglect and to establish a National Center on Child Abuse and Neglect. Additionally, it identifies the federal role in supporting research, evaluation, technical assistance, and data collection activities; it established the Office on Child Abuse and Neglect in the United States Children's Bureau; and mandates the National Clearinghouse on Child Abuse and Neglect Information. It also sets forth a minimum definition of child abuse and neglect.

The key federal legislation addressing child abuse and neglect is the Child Abuse Prevention and Treatment Act (CAPTA), originally enacted in 1974 (Public Law 93-247). It was amended several times and was most recently amended and reauthorized by the Comprehensive Addiction and Recovery Act of 2016.

== Legislative history ==
=== 1973-2000 ===
The Child Abuse Prevention and Treatment Act (CAPTA) was originally introduced by Walter Mondale and became law in 1974 (Public Law 93-247) as key federal legislation addressing child abuse and neglect.

The Community-Based Child Abuse and Neglect Prevention Grants was a program that was originally authorized by Sections 402 to 409 of the Continuing Appropriations Act for Fiscal Year 1985 (Public Law 98-473).

CAPTA was completely rewritten in the Child Abuse Prevention, Adoption and Family Services Act of 1988 (Public Law 100-294). In 1989, it was further amended by the Child Abuse Prevention Challenge Grants Reauthorization Act of 1989 (P.L. 101-126 and the Drug Free School Amendments of 1989 (Public Law 101-226). The Child Abuse Prevention Challenge Grants Reauthorization Act of 1989 (Public Law 101-126) transferred the program to CAPTA, as amended.

The Stewart B. McKinney Homeless Assistance Act Amendments of 1990 (Public Law 101-645) added a new Title III, Certain Preventive Services Regarding Children of Homeless Families or Families at Risk of Homelessness to the Child Abuse and Neglect and Treatment Act.

CAPTA was amended and reauthorized by the Child Abuse, Domestic Violence Adoption and Family Services Act of 1992 (Public Law 102-295), and amended by the Juvenile Justice and Delinquency Prevention Act Amendments of 1992 (Public Law 102-586).

In 1993, the Act was amended by the Older Americans Act Technical Amendments of 1993 (Public Law 103–171, 12/2/93) and in 1994 by the Human Services Amendments of 1994 (Public Law 103–252, 5/19/94).

CAPTA was further amended by the Child Abuse Prevention and Treatment Act Amendments of 1996 (P.L. 104–235,), which amended Title I, replaced the Title II Community-Based Family Resource Centers program with a new Community-Based Family Resource and Support Program, and repealed Title III.

=== 2000-present ===
In 2003, CAPTA was amended by the Keeping Children and Families Safe Act of 2003 (P.L. 108–36,), which amended Title I and replaced Title II, Community-Based Family Resource and Support Program with Community-Based Grants for the Prevention of Child Abuse and Neglect.

CAPTA was reauthorized in 2010, as the Child Abuse Prevention and Treatment Act of 2010 (Public Law 111-320).

The Comprehensive Addiction and Recovery Act of 2016 altered CAPTA requirements for infants affected by substance use or born with withdrawal symptoms or fetal alcohol spectrum disorders.

In 2018, the Substance Use-Disorder Prevention That Promotes Opioid Recovery and Treatment for Patients and Communities Act or the SUPPORT for Patients and Communities Act amended CAPTA (P.L. 115-271).

In 2019, CAPTA was amended by the Victims of Child Abuse Act Reauthorization Act of 2018 (P.L. 115-424, 1/7/2019) to provide immunity from civil and criminal liability for people who make good-faith child abuse or neglect reports.

In 2023, CAPTA was amended by P.L. 117–348. Trafficking Victims Prevention and Protection Reauthorization Act of 2022.

== Effectiveness and state non-compliance ==
In 2018, Congress provided $85 million to states under the law, an amount that anti-abuse advocates criticized as too low, and which some states found too little to justify rigorous compliance, which would bring its own costs.

As of 2019, the law contained a long list of reporting and process requirements for states to be eligible. Though none have been declared non-compliant by the United States Children's Bureau, an investigation by The Boston Globe and ProPublica published in 2019 found that the 50 states, the District of Columbia, and Puerto Rico were out of compliance with the requirements to varying degrees. The report found that underfunding of child welfare agencies and substandard procedures in some states caused failures to prevent avoidable child injuries and deaths.

== Criticisms ==
Critics of CAPTA argue that funding for mandated reporting and surveillance of families depletes resources that could otherwise be used in service to children and families. There is also concern that the perception of families as violent or criminal by mandated reporters creates stigma and bias, generating false positive cases and harming parents and children through traumatic investigations.

Proponents of family policing abolition like law professor Dorothy Roberts argue that such policies have created a robust state surveillance network with the power to separate families. Furthermore, the threat of being reported by doctors, teachers, and other mandated reporters creates distrust in communities and deters families from seeking help from social services. This fear is exacerbated by corruption occurring within many child protection organizations which are motivated to seize children from and thwart reunification efforts with the children's parents because of receiving thousands of dollars in adoption bonuses via the Adoption and Safe Families Act for every child adopted out.

Surveillance of new mothers is considered a reproductive justice issue. Although a positive toxicology report does not confirm health risks to the child, CAPTA requires states to “address the needs of infants born with and identified as being affected by illegal substance abuse or withdrawal symptoms resulting from prenatal drug exposure.” This results in infants and mothers being drug tested, often without their consent, and incites racist discrimination against Black mothers by healthcare workers.

The American College of Obstetricians and Gynecologists (ACOG) acknowledges that “leading medical organizations agree that a positive drug test should not be construed as child abuse or neglect,” and adding that mandated drug testing “disrupts bodily autonomy of the pregnant person and their newborn and is inconsistent with treating substance use disorder as a health condition with social and behavioral dimensions.”

== See also ==
- Karly's Law
- Landeros v. Flood
- UN Convention on the Rights of the Child
