= Outcry =

Outcry usually refers to a loud cry or a large protest, specifically it can refer to:

- Outcry (mini-series), a 2020 documentary series on a wrongful imprisonment for child sexual assault
- "Outcry" (song), a song by Dream Theater from their album A Dramatic Turn of Events
- Outcry (video game), a first person psychological thriller point-and-click adventure video game
- Outcry witness, in United States law, the person who first hears an allegation of abuse made by a child or another victim
- Outcry auction or English auction, an open ascending dynamic auction
- Open outcry, a method of communication between professionals on a stock exchange or futures exchange
- The Outcry, a novel by Henry James published in 1911

== See also ==
- Brouhaha
- Controversy
- Dissent
- Protest
- Scandal
