= Bikers Against Child Abuse =

Charitable worldwide motorcycle organization

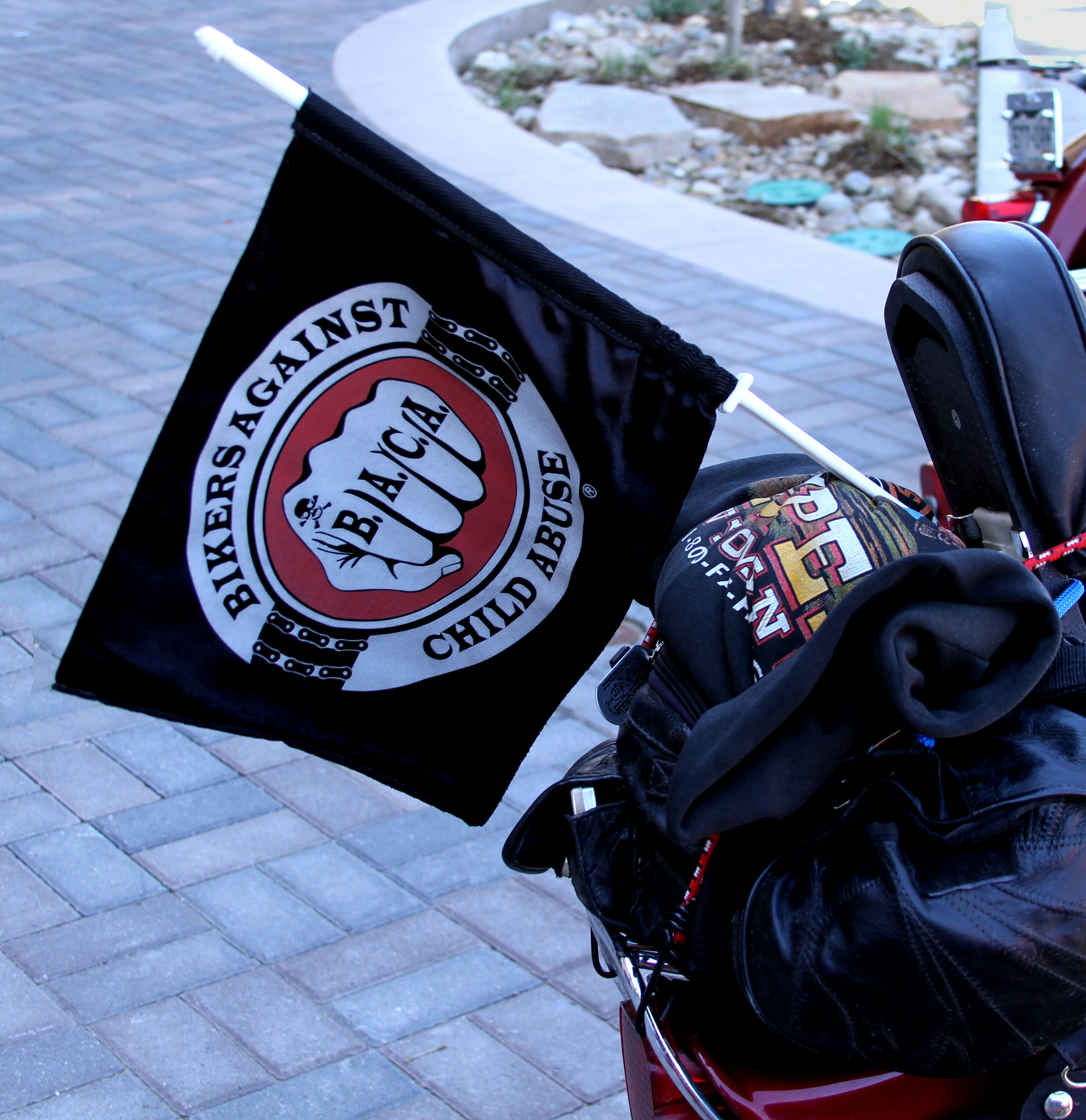
- Abbreviation: B.A.C.A.
- Founded: 1995; 31 years ago
- Founder: John Paul "Chief" Lilly
- Founded at: Provo, Utah, U.S.
- Type: Non profit
- Purpose: Child welfare
- Region served: United States, Australia, Belgium, Canada, Denmark, Germany, Spain, France, Greece, Iceland, Italy, Netherlands, New Zealand, Austria, Portugal, Romania, Switzerland, Sweden, United Kingdom
- Key people: Horace Montoya; Mark "Ogre" Birchette
- Website: bacaworld.org

Bikers Against Child Abuse (B.A.C.A. or B.A.C.A. International, Inc.) is a charitable worldwide motorcycle organization. The organization works to protect children across 19 countries from dangerous individuals and situations.

== History and overview ==
Bikers Against Child Abuse was founded in 1995 in Provo, Utah, United States, by John Paul "Chief" Lilly, who enlisted his friends Horace Montoya and Mark "Ogre" Birchette in establishing the organization.

The organization's stated purpose is to empower abused children to not be afraid of the world in which they live by working in conjunction with local and state officials who are already in place to protect children.

As of January 2026, BACA chapters have been established in 19 countries: United States, Australia, Belgium, Canada, Denmark, Germany, Spain, France, Greece, Iceland, Italy, Netherlands, New Zealand, Austria, Portugal, Romania, Switzerland, Sweden, United Kingdom.

== Activities ==
Any legal guardian who feels their child may have been abused or may potentially be "frightened by his or her environment" can officially request that B.A.C.A. open a case for their child. The organization immediately confirms that local authorities have been contacted and that the abuse has been reported, before meeting with the family in order to determine whether making direct contact with the child would be in their best interest, and whether the situation adheres to the B.A.C.A. Mission; one factor of discretion being that B.A.C.A. does not involve itself in domestic issues between guardians.

If the case is valid according to the B.A.C.A. Mission, the organization offers for the child to join at a "Level 1 Intervention". Upon accepting a case, two bikers — generally one male and one female — act as primary contacts from B.A.C.A. for the child and their family, and as a general positive and strong presence to prevent further conflict. The two bikers may then perform follow-up visits with the family periodically and notify the organization of any specific needs the child might have.

If "Level 1" intervention is not sufficient to deter further abuse or harassment, members may establish a temporary presence at the home of the child as a "Level 2" intervention, being visible at times the family might be the most vulnerable to further abuse and, if necessary, protect the children and the family from violence.

Any cases referred from other established agencies are subject to review by local legal and child services systems before B.A.C.A. responds with any type of contact. B.A.C.A. is able to receive referrals from Child Protective Services, therapists, clergy members, and other organizations that know of a child who could use B.A.C.A.’s support.

Members may attend court proceedings with the children if the court permits, in an effort to assist the child in being less intimidated and frightened, subsequently giving a more accurate testimony. B.A.C.A. may also escort them with errands or to school if they are in fear. According to the organization, members can help the child's legal guardians to navigate the child-welfare system and understand how to file different legal documents such as restraining orders and guardianship documents.

In addition to private events, each chapter of the organization worldwide holds mandatory meetings, which are open to the public, and an annual hundred-mile ride to raise awareness. They may also host awareness and fundraising events like poker runs, particularly during April for Child Abuse Awareness Month. Some chapters hold balloon release events to commemorate abused and/or deceased children.

=== Jan Broberg appearance ===
Actress Jan Broberg Felt, who had previously been kidnapped twice by Robert Ersol Berchtold, was with her mother at the Dixie State College in St. George, Utah for the annual Women's Conference. Fifteen B.A.C.A. members offered to escort Broberg and provide their services as security personnel after Berchtold threatened violence against her if she presented her book, Stolen Innocence: The Jan Broberg Story, at the conference.

The Conference commenced without issue until Berchtold arrived at the event. He approached B.A.C.A. member Les Watson and asked him to hand out literature to attendees. Watson wanted to review the papers before passing them out, which caused Berchtold to threaten him. Watson refused to hand out the papers, at which point he told other B.A.C.A. members to call the police. Berchtold returned to his vehicle before revving his engine aggressively and subsequently striking Watson with his vehicle. Upon being struck, Watson continued to cling to the van's hood for about 100 feet, at which point Berchtold brandished a gun and Watson jumped from the moving vehicle. Watson suffered back and leg injuries in the incident.

A witness was later able to provide the van's license plate number, which led to Berchtold's arrest on charges of simple assault, criminal trespassing and disorderly conduct. He was held at the Purgatory Correctional Facility in Hurricane, Utah until he was released on $970 bail, which was later increased to $19,250 after he was charged.

== Program evaluation ==
One of the group's founders, J.P. "Chief" Lilly, and at least one other confirmed member of the group, Dee C. Ray, conducted a self-published study. Lilly states the organization has respect and support in their mission from the four largest motorcycle clubs in the United States: the Bandidos, the Hells Angels, the Pagans and the Outlaws. Staten Island Chapter President at the time, "Popeye", made references to the study in 2016, well before its publication, calling it "a preliminary study from 2014".

The B.A.C.A. study states, “Although we are cautious in interpreting causation due to [the] nature of [a] single group design, it is evident that child emotional and behavioral improvement occurred during the time that children were involved in B.A.C.A. intervention. However, it should be noted, improvement also correlated with children’s temporal distance from the crisis situation.”

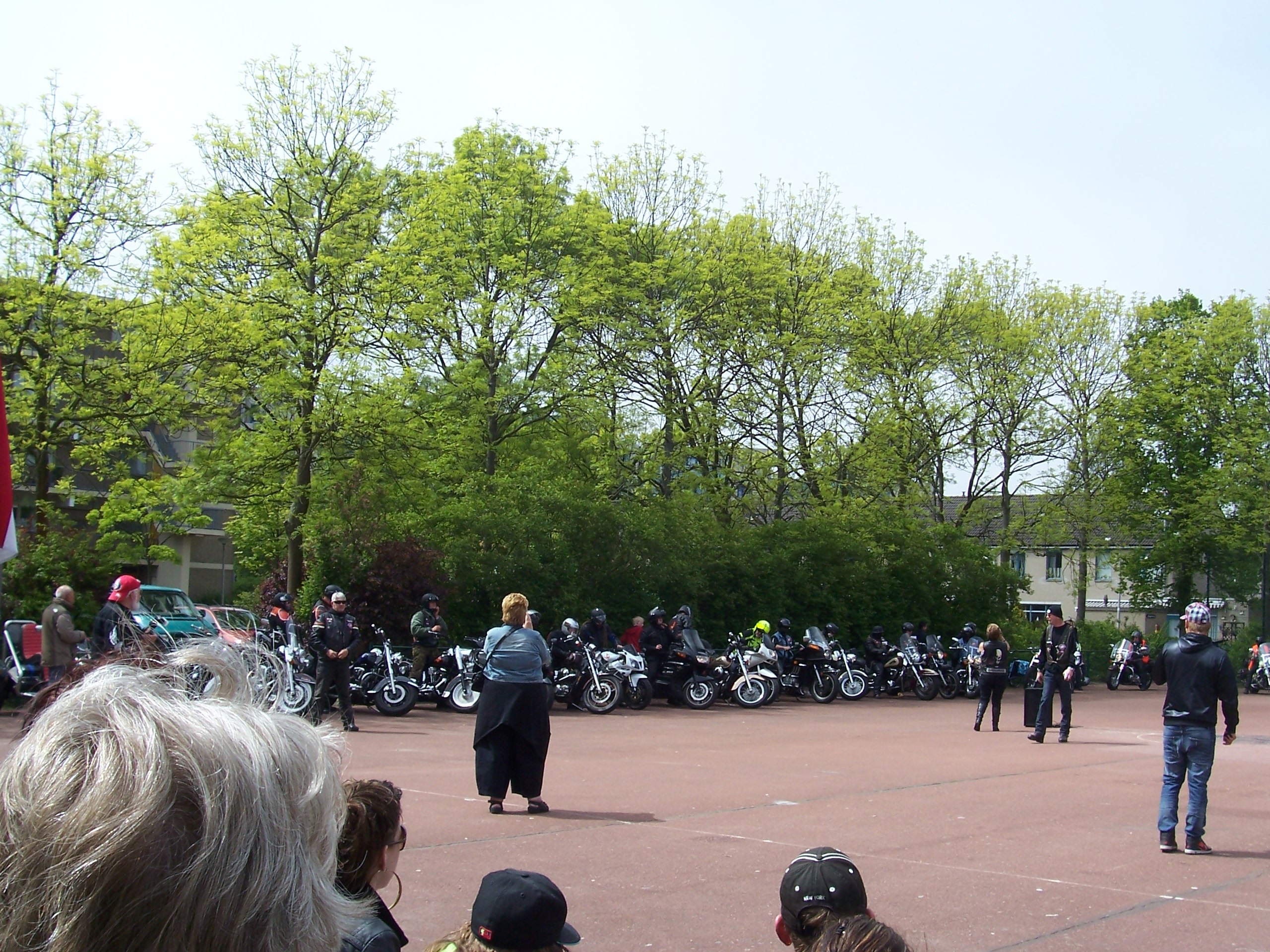
Fundraising for B.A.C.A. in Katwijk, the Netherlands, 2010.

== Membership ==
=== United States ===
Road names are used by members for any children in the abused family for confidentiality and protection. Each member undergoes a minimum of 40–50 hours of initial training to better help support victims. Before becoming a supporter, a person must be at least 18 years of age, be fingerprinted and have an extensive FBI background check done to ensure there are no prior charges of child or domestic abuse.

B.A.C.A. is a U.S. Registered non-profit, 501(c)(3) tax exempt organization as designated by the Internal Revenue Service.

=== Australia ===
In Australia, BACA (officially "Bikers Against Child Abuse Australia Incorporated") is a registered not-for-profit charity, with around 3,000 members and eight chapters: Western Australia; South Australia; Victoria; Hobart, Tasmania; Canberra, ACT; Newcastle, NSW; and Canterbury, NSW. They work in pairs, and must only ever visit a child together. Before being admitted and being allowed to wear the BACA logo, members have to pass background, criminal, and Working With Children Checks, and then have to complete the mandatory BACA training. They cite their most important rule as "you show up for the kids and never break a promise made to a child". Government agencies often do not consider BACA as legitimate options to help children, for reasons including confusion with outlaw motorcycle gangs or stereotypes associated with "bikie" culture, or believing that there is enough support for victims of abuse in the court system already.

== Complaints ==
In January 2004, a group of B.A.C.A. members were removed from a Frontier Airlines aircraft preparing to travel to Denver, Colorado. A member, Darrell Sparti, approached a parent who had spanked his child on the flight and proceeded to tell the parent to stop. An argument ensued, whereupon Frontier staff asked both the family and the B.A.C.A. members to leave the plane, citing concern for "the safety of the passengers."

On April 10, 2004, several members of B.A.C.A. arrived at a victim's home upon the request of the child's mother. The child's alleged teenage abuser lived next door, and it was stated by the perpetrator's lawyer that B.A.C.A. members revved their engines and pointed at the alleged perpetrator's house. The article states most of the B.A.C.A. members did not know the alleged perpetrator lived next door, and therefore were not acting in a deliberate way to harass the perpetrator. The police were called and approximately 20 officers visited the house. This incident escalated with allegations that the Payson police would start following the victim's family and any B.A.C.A. members any time they would be seen driving around town.

In a June 2004 article, a former member alleged that some B.A.C.A. members had a tendency to take the law into their own hands.

In 2016, New Zealand Police voiced concerns when B.A.C.A. opened their Auckland chapter. At the time, Auckland B.A.C.A. Secretary Anne Murphy stated, "We do not use violence or intimidation.”

== Legal issues involving members in the U.S. ==
On March 18, 2009, the Cyber Crime Unit of the Texas Attorney General's office announced that David Wayne Garvey, a member of B.A.C.A. in Houston, had been arrested for possession of child pornography. Upon being notified of his arrest, the Houston chapter permanently revoked Garvey's membership. Garvey was sentenced on March 29, 2011, to 20 years on four counts of “Possession with intent to promote child pornography”, Texas Penal Code 43.26(e).

Two members of the Sam Bass chapter of B.A.C.A. in Round Rock, Texas, Daniel Rodriguez and his wife Shirley Ann Rodriguez, were arrested on July 18, 2018, for 23 counts of abusing foster children in their care, including indecency with a child and injury to a child. The Sam Bass chapter permanently revoked the memberships for both Daniel and Shirley Ann Rodriguez upon learning of the arrests.

Oklahoma B.A.C.A. member Richard David West, 41, was arrested July 10, 2019, and charged with Lewd or Indecent Acts or Proposals to a Child Under 16. West was found to have photos and videos of the 15 year old victim who was introduced to him when she was 12 years old through the B.A.C.A. referral.

On April 9, 2025, John C. Todaro, the vice president of the Buffalo, New York chapter was arrested following an Internet Crimes Against Children investigation and charged with two felonies: promoting a sexual performance by a child and possessing a sexual performance by a child. Todaro was also accused of possessing and distributing child pornography. He was arraigned in court in Amherst, New York, and released.

== Similar organizations ==
Comparing B.A.C.A. To Other Similar Biker Organizations Involved In Child Abuse Protection
Organization Name	Year Established	Founded In	Operates In	MC Style Hierarchy	Charity Status	Has Creed	Holds Events	Use of Colors	Use of Aliases	Claims to be Law Abiding
Templars Against Child Abuse	1985	Denmark	Worldwide	Yes	Non Profit	N/A	Yes	Yes	Yes	Yes
Bikers Against Child Abuse	1995	USA	Worldwide	Yes	501(c)(3)	Yes	Yes	Yes	Yes	Yes
Punishers Law Enforcement MC	1999	USA	Worldwide	N/A	Non Profit	N/A	Yes	Yes	Yes	Yes
Enforcers Law Enforcement MC	2001	USA	North America	N/A	N/A	Yes	Yes	Yes	Yes	Yes
Bikers United Against Child Abuse	2001	Australia	Australia	N/A	N/A	Yes	Yes	Yes	Yes	Yes
Guardians Of the Children	2006	USA	North America	Yes	501(c)(3)	Yes	Yes	Yes	Yes	Yes
Gargoyles, Protectors Of Children MC	2009	USA	USA	N/A	Non Profit	No	Yes	Yes	Yes	Yes
Bikers Against Bullies	2012	USA	Worldwide	No	Non Profit	Yes	Yes	Yes	Yes	Yes
Guardians of the Children Canada	2014	Canada	North America	Yes	Canadian Charity	Yes	Yes	Yes	Yes	Yes

== See also ==
- Child protection
