= Landeros v. Flood =

Court case in California

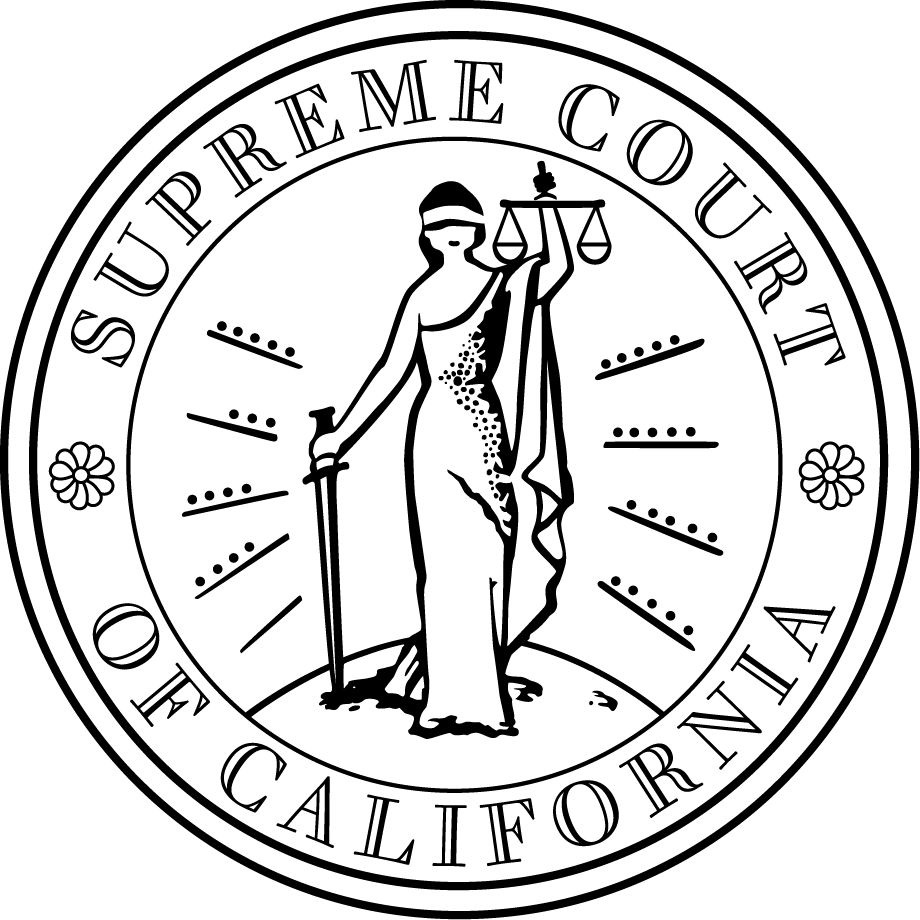
- Court: Supreme Court of California
- Full case name: Gita Landeros, a Minor, etc. Plaintiff and Appellant, v. A. J. Flood et al, Defendants and Respondents
- Decided: June 30, 1976
- Citations: 17 Cal. 3d 399, 551 P.2d 389 97 ALR 3d 324

Case history
- Prior actions: Superior Court of Santa Clara County, No. 260674, Albert F. DeMarco, Judge

Court membership
- Judges sitting: Mosk, J.; Wright, C. J.; McComb, J.; Tobriner, J.; Sullivan, J.; Clark, J.; Richardson, J.

Keywords
- Child abuse, tort, medical malpractice, failure to diagnose child abuse

Landeros v. Flood was a 1976 court case in the state of California involving child abuse and alleged medical malpractice.

In 1971, Gita Landeros, a minor, was seen in the emergency room by Dr. A. J. Flood for injuries inflicted by her mother and the mother's common law husband. Dr. Flood failed to diagnose "battered child syndrome" and also did not report the injuries to proper civil authorities in violation of California law. The child was released to the custody of her mother and the mother's common law husband, where she experienced further injury at their hands. The parents fled the state, but were apprehended and convicted of criminal child abuse. Gita Landeros brought a civil suit in tort for damages against Dr. Flood. The trial court dismissed her case as a matter of law. The case was appealed and decided in 1976 by the California Supreme Court.

== Overview ==
Gita Landeros Appellant, a minor, sought review of a judgment of the Superior Court of Santa Clara County (California), which sustained general demurrers and dismissed her medical malpractice action against appellees, a physician and a hospital, for injuries sustained when they failed to properly diagnose and treat the condition from which she was suffering.

Appellant minor argued trial court error in sustaining the demurrer of appellees, doctor and hospital, to her malpractice suit against them, because issues existed as to whether they had a duty to recognize a case of battered child syndrome that was to be reported to authorities, and whether their conduct proximately caused appellant's injuries. The court agreed, noting first that appellant was returned to parental custody after having been treated for injuries not appearing to be accidental, and that she then was traumatically abused. Because it was unclear whether treating physicians should have recognized the syndrome for treatment purposes, appellant was entitled to prove by expert testimony the standard of care against which appellees were to be held. And as appellees could not escape liability if it was foreseeable that appellant would suffer further injury, appellant was entitled to prove that appellees' conduct proximately caused her injuries, even if the parent's intervening act was the actual cause. Finally, appellant was entitled to show that appellees failed to exercise due care in not reporting her injuries to authorities who would have shielded her from further harm.

== Issues ==
1. Is there a duty for a physician to recognize a case of battered child syndrome (child abuse) and report it to the appropriate authorities?
2. Does medical standard of care dictate recognition of child abuse?
3. Should the appellant (Landeros) have been allowed to introduce expert testimony concerning standard of care in her malpractice action?
4. Was further injury from child abuse foreseeable?
5. Did the appellant's actions of allowing Landeros to return to the care of her abusive parents proximately cause her subsequent injuries, even if the parent's intervening actions in harming her were the actual cause of her injuries?
6. Did the appellants fail to show due care by not reporting Landeros' injuries to authorities who could have prevented further injury?

== Holdings ==
1. It is established standard of care for physicians to suspect, work-up and diagnose child abuse when such a case presents in the emergency room or physician's office.
2. California statutory requirements obligate the physician to report suspected cases of child abuse to the proper civil authorities. Failure to do so is a violation of law.
3. The summary dismissal of the complaint and allegation that the failure to diagnose child abuse and report it alleging this to be the proximate cause of the plaintiff's subsequent injuries was reversible error by the trial court.
4. The failure to allow the plaintiff to introduce expert testimony was reversible error.
5. The issue of foreseeability in negligence cases is a question for the jury under California law, and this applies to the actions of third parties.

== Facts and background ==
Plaintiff brought the action by her guardian ad litem against A. J. Flood, a physician, and The San Jose Hospitals & Health Center, Inc. (hereinafter called the San Jose Hospital). The amended complaint purports to allege four "causes of action." of recovery alleged in support of a single cause of action for compensatory damages for personal injuries caused by defendants' negligence in failing to properly diagnose and treat the condition from which plaintiff was suffering; the fourth "cause of action" merely adds a claim for punitive damages on allegations that defendants' conduct in this respect was wilful and wanton. Defendants filed general demurrers. The court sustained the demurrers as to the first and second "causes of action" with leave to amend, and as to the third and fourth "causes of action" without leave to amend. Plaintiff elected to stand on her complaint as previously amended, and a judgment dismissing the entire action was therefore entered. On this appeal plaintiff has expressly abandoned her claim of punitive damages.

The material factual allegations of the amended complaint are as follows. Plaintiff was born on May 14, 1970. On repeated occasions during the first year of her life she was severely beaten by her mother and the latter's common law husband, one Reyes. On April 26, 1971, when the plaintiff was eleven months old, her mother took her to the San Jose Hospital for examination, diagnosis, and treatment. The attending physician was defendant Dr. Flood, acting on his own behalf and as agent of the defendant San Jose Hospital. At the time, the plaintiff was suffering from a comminuted spiral fracture of the right tibia and fibula, which gave the appearance of having been caused by a twisting force. Plaintiff's mother had no explanation for this injury. Plaintiff had bruises over her entire body. In addition, she had a non-depressed linear skull fracture which was then in the process of healing. Plaintiff demonstrated fear and apprehension when approached. Inasmuch as all plaintiff's injuries gave the appearance of having been intentionally inflicted by other persons, she exhibited the medical condition known as the battered child syndrome.

Landeros presented to the emergency room with a spiral fracture of the tibia, among other injuries.

It is alleged that proper diagnosis of plaintiff's condition would have included taking X-rays of her entire skeletal structure, and that such procedure would have revealed the fracture of her skull. Defendants negligently failed to take such X-rays, and thereby negligently failed to diagnose her true condition. It is further alleged that proper medical treatment of plaintiff's battered child syndrome would have included reporting her injuries to local law enforcement authorities or juvenile probation department. Such a report would have resulted in an investigation by the concerned agencies, followed by a placement of plaintiff in protective custody until her safety was assured. Defendants negligently failed to make such report.

The complaint avers that as a proximate result of the foregoing negligence plaintiff was released from the San Jose Hospital without proper diagnosis and treatment of her battered child syndrome, and was returned to the custody of her mother and Reyes who resumed physically abusing her until she sustained traumatic blows to her right eye and back, puncture wounds over her left lower leg and across her back, severe bites on her face, and second and third degree burns on her left hand.

On July 1, 1971, plaintiff was again brought in for medical care, but to a different doctor and hospital. Her battered child syndrome was immediately diagnosed and reported to local police and juvenile probation authorities, and she was taken into protective custody. Following hospitalization and surgery she was placed with foster parents, and the latter subsequently undertook proceedings to adopt her. Plaintiff's mother and Reyes fled the state, but were apprehended, returned for trial, and convicted of the crime of child abuse.

With respect to damages the complaint alleges that as a proximate result of defendants' negligence plaintiff suffered painful permanent physical injuries and great mental distress, "including the probable loss of use or amputation of her left hand."

The second and third "causes of action" are predicated on defendants' failure to comply with three related sections of the Penal Code. Section 11160 provides in relevant part that every hospital to which any person is brought who is suffering from any injuries inflicted "in violation of any penal law of this State" must report that fact immediately, by telephone and in writing, to the local law enforcement authorities. Section 11161 imposes the identical duty on every physician who has under his care any person suffering from any such injuries. Section 11161.5 deals specifically with child abuse, and declares in pertinent part that in any case in which a minor is under a physician's care or is brought to him for diagnosis, examination or treatment, and "it appears to the physician" from observation of the minor that the latter has any physical injuries "which appear to have been inflicted upon him by other than accidental means by any person," he must report that fact by telephone and in writing to the local law enforcement authorities and the juvenile probation department. All three sections require the report to state the name of the victim, if known, together with his whereabouts and the character and extent of his injuries; and a violation of any of the sections is a misdemeanor (§ 11162).

Among such laws are the statutes penalizing child abuse. The statute imposes the same duty on certain other health care professionals, school officials and teachers, child care supervisors, and social workers.

The trial court did not allow Gita Landeros to present expert testimony supporting her allegations of negligence against Dr. Flood. The trial court also dismissed the complaint of Gita Landeros as a matter of law. The decision is appealed to the California Supreme Court.

== Opinion ==
Opinion written by Chief Judge Mosk: By means of allegations phrased largely in the statutory language plaintiff undertakes to charge defendants with a duty to comply with section 11161.5 (second "cause of action") and sections 11160 and 11161 (third "cause of action"), and avers that they failed to make the reports thus required by law. Her allegations of proximate cause and damages on these counts are essentially identical to those of the first count.

We have found no case directly in point, but the issues may be decided by reference to well settled principles. Succinctly stated, the rules governing our consideration of this appeal are "that a general demurrer admits the truth of all material factual allegations in the complaint [citation]; that the question of plaintiff's ability to prove these allegations, or the possible difficulty in making such proof does not concern the reviewing court [citations here omitted]; and that plaintiff need only plead facts showing that [may be shown to be relevant during the trial.]

The standard of care in malpractice cases is also well known. With unimportant variations in phrasing, we have consistently held that a physician is required to possess and exercise, in both diagnosis and treatment, etc. In this medical malpractice action plaintiff Gita Landeros, a minor, appeals from a judgment of dismissal entered upon an order sustaining general demurrers to her amended complaint. As will appear, we have concluded that the complaint states a cause of action and hence that the judgment must be reversed.

Plaintiff brought the action by her guardian ad litem against A. J. Flood, a physician, and The San Jose Hospitals & Health Center, Inc. (hereinafter called the San Jose Hospital). The amended complaint purports to allege four "causes of action." of recovery alleged in support of a single cause of action for compensatory damages for personal injuries caused by defendants' negligence in failing to properly diagnose and treat the condition from which plaintiff was suffering; the fourth "cause of action" merely adds a claim for punitive damages on allegations that defendants' conduct in this respect was wilful and wanton. Defendants filed general demurrers. The court sustained the demurrers as to the first and second "causes of action" with leave to amend, and as to the third and fourth "causes of action" without leave to amend. Plaintiff elected to stand on her complaint as previously amended, and a judgment dismissing the entire action was therefore entered.

On this appeal plaintiff has expressly abandoned her claim of punitive damages. It is alleged that proper diagnosis of plaintiff's condition would have included taking X-rays of her entire skeletal structure, and that such procedure would have revealed the fracture of her skull. Defendants negligently failed to take such X-rays, and thereby negligently failed to diagnose her true condition. It is further alleged that proper medical treatment of plaintiff's battered child syndrome would have included reporting her injuries to local law enforcement authorities or juvenile probation department. Such a report would have resulted in an investigation by the concerned agencies, followed by a placement of plaintiff in protective custody until her safety was assured. Defendants negligently failed to make such report. The complaint avers that as a proximate result of the foregoing negligence plaintiff was released from the San Jose Hospital without proper diagnosis and treatment of her battered child syndrome, and was returned to the custody of her mother and Reyes who resumed physically abusing her until she sustained traumatic blows to her right eye and back, puncture wounds over her left lower leg and across her back, severe bites on her face, and second and third degree burns on her left hand.

On July 1, 1971, plaintiff was again brought in for medical care, but to a different doctor and hospital. Her battered child syndrome was immediately diagnosed and reported to local police and juvenile probation authorities, and she was taken into protective custody. Following hospitalization and surgery she was placed with foster parents, and the latter subsequently undertook proceedings to adopt her. Plaintiff's mother and Reyes fled the state, but were apprehended, returned for trial, and convicted of the crime of child abuse.

With respect to damages the complaint alleges that as a proximate result of defendants' negligence plaintiff suffered painful permanent physical injuries and great mental distress, including the probable loss of use or amputation of her left hand. The second and third "causes of action" are predicated on defendants' failure to comply with three related sections of the Penal Code. Section 11160 provides in relevant part that every hospital to which any person is brought who is suffering from any injuries inflicted "in violation of any penal law of this State" n4 must report that fact immediately, by telephone and in writing, to the local law enforcement authorities. Section 11161 imposes the identical duty on every physician who has under his care any person suffering from any such injuries. Section 11161.5 deals specifically with child abuse, and declares in pertinent part that in any case in which a minor is under a physician's care or is brought to him for diagnosis, examination or treatment, and "it appears to the physician" from observation of the minor that the latter has any physical injuries "which appear to have been inflicted upon him by other than accidental means by any person," he must report that fact by telephone and in writing to the local law enforcement authorities and the juvenile probation department. All three sections require the report to state the name of the victim, if known, together with his whereabouts and the character and extent of his injuries; and a violation of any of the sections is a misdemeanor.

Among such laws, of course, are the statutes penalizing child abuse. The statute imposes the same duty on certain other health care professionals, school officials and teachers, child care supervisors, and social workers. By means of allegations phrased largely in the statutory language plaintiff undertakes to charge defendants with a duty to comply with section 11161.5 (second "cause of action") and sections 11160 and 11161 (third "cause of action"), and avers that they failed to make the reports thus required by law. Her allegations of proximate cause and damages on these counts are essentially identical to those of the first count.

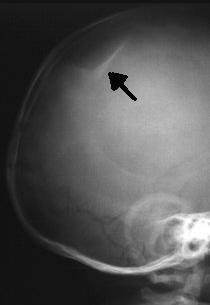
X-ray image of a depressed skull fracture in an infant. This injury is typical of child abuse cases.

We have found no case directly in point, but the issues may be decided by reference to well settled principles. Succinctly stated, the rules governing our consideration of this appeal are "that a general demurrer admits the truth of all material factual allegations in the complaint; that the question of plaintiff's ability to prove these allegations, or the possible difficulty in making such proof does not concern the reviewing court; and that plaintiff need only plead facts showing that he may be.

The standard of care in malpractice cases is also well known. With unimportant variations in phrasing, we have consistently held that a physician is required to possess and exercise, in both diagnosis and treatment. The first question presented, accordingly, is whether the foregoing standard of care includes a requirement that the physician know how to diagnose and treat the battered child syndrome.

It appears from the literature that the battered child syndrome was first tentatively identified and reported to the medical profession in the early 1950s. Further surveys and analyses of the syndrome followed, culminating in a landmark article published in 1962 in the Journal of the American Medical Association. Since that date numerous additional studies of the condition have been undertaken, and their results and recommendations publicized in the medical journals. A typical article in the field recites case histories of child abuse, points out the distinguishing signs and symptoms of the battered child syndrome, and advises the practicing physician how to detect and treat the condition. For a detailed survey of the medical literature on the topic from its beginning until 1965, A selection of the later articles is cited in Grumet, The Plaintive Plaintiffs: Victims of the Battered Child Syndrome

While helpful, the foregoing general history of the battered child syndrome is not conclusive on the precise question in the case at bar. The question is whether a reasonably prudent physician examining this plaintiff in 1971 would have been led to suspect she was a victim of the battered child syndrome from the particular injuries and circumstances presented to him, would have confirmed that diagnosis by ordering X-rays of her entire skeleton, and would have promptly reported his findings to appropriate authorities to prevent a recurrence of the injuries. There are numerous recommendations to follow each of these diagnostic and treatment procedures in the medical literature cited above.

For example, the leading article by Kempe et al., op. cit., supra, states that "A physician needs to have a high initial level of suspicion of the diagnosis of the battered-child syndrome in instances of subdural hematoma, multiple unexplained fractures at different stages of healing, failure to thrive, when soft tissue swelling or skin bruising are present, or in any other situation where the degree and type of injury is at variance with the history given regarding its occurrence . . . ." (Id., at p. 20.) Of the different types of fractures exhibited, an arm or leg fracture caused by a twisting force is particularly significant because "The extremities are the 'handles' for rough handling" of the child by adults. (Id., at p. 22.) The article also contains numerous recommendations to conduct a "radiologic examination of the entire skeleton" for the purpose of confirming the diagnosis, explaining that "To the informed physician, the bones tell a story the child is too young or too frightened to tell." (Id., at p. 18.) Finally, on the subject of management of the case it is repeatedly emphasized that the physician "should report possible willful trauma to the police department or any special children's protective service that operates in his community" (id., at p. 23) in order to forestall further injury to the child: "All too often, despite the apparent cooperativeness of the parents and their apparent desire to have the child with them, the child returns to his home only to be assaulted again and suffer permanent brain damage or death." (Id., at p. 24.)

Inasmuch as the "common knowledge" exception to the foregoing rule does not apply on the facts here alleged, the trial court could not properly conclude as a matter of law that defendants' standard of professional care did not include the diagnostic and treatment procedures outlined in the complaint. Plaintiff is therefore entitled to the opportunity to prove by way of expert testimony that in the circumstances of this case a reasonably prudent physician would have followed those procedures. Whether the physician would have followed the procedure of reporting plaintiff's injuries to the authorities, however, is not solely a question of good medical practice. The above-cited reporting statutes (Pen. Code, § 11160- 11161.5) were in force in 1971. They evidence a determination by the Legislature that in the event a physician does diagnose a battered child syndrome, due care includes a duty to report that fact to the authorities. In other words, since the enactment of these statutes a physician who diagnoses a battered child syndrome will not be heard to say that other members of his profession would not have made such a report. The same is true of each of the persons and entities covered by this legislation. Accordingly, although expert testimony on the issue of a duty to report is admissible, it is not mandatory.

The statute also lays to rest defendant Flood's concern that if he were required to report his findings to the authorities he might be held liable for violation of the physician-patient privilege. Section 11161.5 specifically exempts the physician from any civil or criminal liability for making a report pursuant to its terms.

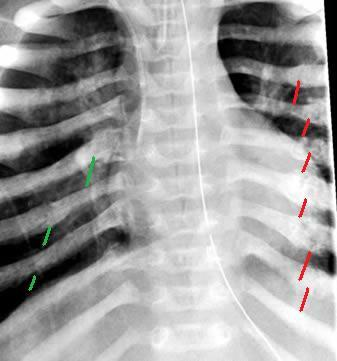
Multiple rib fractures in an infant. Red are old and healed. Green are newer.

Defendants complain that the first "cause of action" is nevertheless fatally defective because it assertedly fails to allege certain specific facts, i.e., that Dr. Flood negligently treated plaintiff's leg fracture, that proper treatment of that fracture or the bruises on plaintiff's back included taking an X-ray of her skull, and that Dr. Flood negligently failed to ask plaintiff's mother for an explanation of the cause of the fracture. None of these allegations is necessary, however, because they are irrelevant to the gist of the complaint. Plaintiff's theory is that in the circumstances of this case the fracture, the bruises, and the lack of an explanation offered by her mother are themselves indicia of the underlying battered child syndrome of which plaintiff was the victim, and it was that condition which defendants negligently failed to diagnose and treat. For the reasons stated, the complaint adequately alleges the facts necessary to support such a theory. A third person may act in a particular manner is the hazard or one of the hazards which makes the actor negligent, such an act whether innocent, negligent, intentionally tortious, or criminal does not prevent the actor from being liable for harm caused thereby."

As we recently observed with respect to a determination of duty, however, "foreseeability is a question of fact for the jury." The same rule applies when the issue is whether the intervening act of a third person was foreseeable and therefore did not constitute a superseding cause: in such circumstances "The foreseeability of the risk generally frames a question for the trier of fact" Restatement the fact that the risk eventuates does not relieve him of responsibility.

Accordingly, the trial court in the case at bar could not properly rule as a matter of law that the defendants' negligence was not the proximate cause of plaintiff's injuries. Plaintiff is entitled to prove by expert testimony that defendants should reasonably have foreseen that her caretakers were likely to resume their physical abuse and inflict further injuries on her if she were returned directly to their custody. Again defendant Flood presses only a technical point of pleading, claiming the allegation of proximate cause is fatally defective because the foreseeability of the intervening conduct of plaintiff's mother and Reyes is not specifically set forth. It is asserted that under the case law such an allegation is mandatory if the foreseeability of the intervening act does not clearly appear from the pleaded facts of negligence and injury. As shown above, however, here the occurrence of the intervening act is the precise hazard to which defendants' conduct is alleged to have negligently exposed plaintiff, and the injuries pleaded are those which a reasonably prudent physician would have foreseen as likely to ensue from that negligence. In these circumstances "The allegations of the complaint are sufficient to present the issue" of proximate cause.

Pursuant to our duty to liberally construe pleadings with a view to achieving substantial justice we therefore treat the second and third "causes of action" as alternative counts setting forth plaintiff's theory of statutory liability. The purpose of that theory is manifestly to raise a presumption that by omitting to report plaintiff's injuries to the authorities as required by law, defendants failed to exercise due care—a presumption now codified in Evidence Code section 669. Defendant Flood correctly concedes that the complaint alleges facts showing compliance with the first, third and fourth of the conditions specified of rebutting that presumption.

Insofar as relevant here, section 669 provides: "(a) The failure of a person to exercise due care is presumed if: "(1) He violated a statute, ordinance, or regulation of a public entity; "(2) The violation proximately caused death or injury to person or property; "(3) The death or injury resulted from an occurrence of the nature which the statute, ordinance, or regulation was designed to prevent; and "(4) The person suffering the death or the injury to his person or property was one of the class of persons for whose protection the statute, ordinance, or regulation was adopted. "(b) This presumption may be rebutted by proof that: "(1) The person violating the statute, ordinance, or regulation did what might reasonably be expected of a person of ordinary prudence, acting under similar circumstances, who desired to comply with the law; . . ." A number of recent commentators support this theory of liability. Finally, defendants raise two questions of statutory interpretation. They contend that even if plaintiff may rely on Penal Code section 11161.5 in this case, she cannot invoke sections 11160 and 11161 because the latter are "general" statutes which have assertedly been superseded by the former as a "special" statute on the same topic. But such supersession occurs only when the provisions are "inconsistent" which is not here the case. Sections 11160 and 11161.5 are directed to different classes of persons, and hence are not inconsistent but complementary. Sections 11161 and 11161.5, on the other hand, are duplicative of each other to the extent that the former deals with physical injuries unlawfully inflicted on minors and the latter deals with the observation of such injuries by a physician. But inasmuch as the same penalty is provided for a violation of each section they do not present an irreconcilable conflict requiring one to give way to the other. There is nothing to prevent the Legislature from imposing a reporting requirement on physicians in two separate statutes, even if their coverage apparently overlaps.

Defendants next contend that plaintiff can rely on section 11161.5 only if she can prove that Dr. Flood in fact observed her various injuries and in fact formed the opinion they were caused by other than accidental means and by another person—in other words, that his failure to comply with the reporting requirement of the statute was intentional rather than negligent. We first note that the complaint in effect so alleges, thereby mooting the issue at this pleading stage. For the guidance of the court at the trial, however, we briefly address the point of proof. The provision of section 11161.5 is ambiguous with respect to the required state of mind of the physician. It has been suggested that for the purposes of a criminal prosecution "the more reasonable interpretation of the statutory language is that no physician can be convicted unless it is shown that it actually appeared to him that the injuries were inflicted injuries and formed the opinion they were intentionally inflicted on her.

By parity of reasoning, the same rule will apply if plaintiff elects to rely at trial on sections 11160 and 11161 as well. This does not mean, of course, that plaintiff can meet her burden only by extracting damaging admissions from defendant Flood. "The knowledge a person may have when material to an issue in a judicial proceeding is a fact to be proven as any other fact. It differs from physical objects and phenomena in that it is a state of mind like belief or consciousness and cannot be seen, heard or otherwise directly observed by other persons. It may be evidenced by the affirmative statement or admission of the possessor of it. If he is silent or says he did not have such knowledge, it may be evidenced in other ways," i.e., by circumstantial evidence and the inferences which the trier of fact may draw therefrom. Plaintiff will therefore be entitled to introduce proof of facts alleged in her complaint as circumstantial evidence that defendant Flood possessed the requisite state of mind, and any conflict between such evidence and direct testimony of defendant Flood will be for the trier of fact to resolve.

The judgment is reversed.

Judges Wright, C. J., McComb, J., Tobriner, J., Sullivan, J., Clark, J., and Richardson, J., concurred.

== Discussion ==
A diagnosis of battered child syndrome essentially means that serious injuries inflicted on a child were done by another person, by other than accidental means, and it had become an accepted medical diagnosis by the early 1970s. Many states have enacted penal statutes prohibiting child abuse, and many have enacted statutes of a general nature, or specifically applicable to cases of child abuse, imposing reporting requirements on physicians, and others in a professional position to recognize abuse.

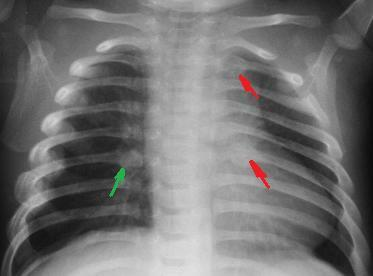
Fractured ribs in various stages of healing, typically seen from squeezing injury. Red shows old healed fractures. Green is newer fracture.

The decision in Landeros v. Flood was the first time that a cause of action was established to exist in favor of a battered child against a physician who negligently failed to diagnose the battered child syndrome or to comply with an applicable reporting statute. Such failure was found to be the cause of further similar injury to the child. The causal chain was not broken by the fact that the subsequent injury was inflicted by the same third persons, namely the child's mother and her common-law husband who were responsible for the original injuries. The court held that no physician could be convicted for failure to make the necessary reports to the civil authorities as required by California statute, unless it was shown that it actually appeared to him that the injuries were inflicted on the child, so that his failure to report was intentional and not merely negligent. If the child wished to satisfy the requirements of the statute, it would be necessary to persuade the trier of fact that the physician actually observed her injuries and formed the requisite opinion that they were intentionally inflicted on her. The court also held that even if the trial court found the child experienced further beatings at the hands of her mother and the latter's husband, it constituted an "intervening act" and not a "superseding cause", thereby relieving the defendants of liability. This was predicated on the finding (at the trial court level) that the foreseeability arose directly from the risk created by the original negligence. This would be the risk created by the original failure of the physician to diagnose and report the injuries. This was a question of fact for the jury, and could not be dismissed by the trial court as a matter of law.

Child abuse, or battered child syndrome was first reported in the medical literature in 1946 by Caffey. By the 1960s, the medical literature was rife with reports and discussions of both the syndrome, and the need for health care professionals to report it when diagnosed or suspected.

Similarly, there was copious discussion of the problem of child abuse in the sociological literature of the day.

It became apparent that before social and legal institutions can improve the home environment of a physically abused child, or remove the child from the harmful environment where necessary, the child must be identified. It is generally recognized that the physician is the primary means of identifying the abused child. Despite existing legislation requiring, as a matter of law, the reporting of suspicious cases, many physicians remained reluctant to report cases to civil authorities. Physicians reluctance to report has been traced to these factors :

1. The lack of standard definition, especially in the reporting statutes, as to what constitutes child abuse.
2. Uncertainty that the diagnosis of "battered child syndrome" is correct or appropriate in individual cases.
3. Reluctance to breach doctor–patient confidentiality.
4. Fear that reporting will cause parents not to bring injured children for medical attention.
5. Fear of criminal or civil penalties for incorrect diagnoses.
6. General eschewing of legal and social welfare agencies.
7. Lack of knowledge of procedures involved with reporting.

Landeros v. Flood was a landmark case in which tort law was used to purposely change the behavior of physicians and encourage them to report suspected child abuse. Otherwise, they would face the threat of civil action for damages in tort proximately flowing from the failure to report the suspected injuries.
