= Keeping Children and Families Safe Act =

American federal legislation

- Long title: An Act to reauthorize and strengthen certain programs for child abuse prevention and treatment, adoption opportunities, abandoned infants assistance, and family violence prevention and services, and for other purposes.
- Enacted by: the 108th United States Congress
- Effective: June 25, 2003

Citations
- Public law: Pub. L. 108–36 (text) (PDF)
- Statutes at Large: 117 Stat. 800

Codification
- Acts amended: Child Abuse Prevention and Treatment Act; Adoption Opportunities Act; Abandoned Infants Assistance Act; Family Violence Prevention and Services Act

Legislative history
- Introduced in the Senate as S. 342 by Sen. Judd Gregg (R–NH) on February 11, 2003; Committee consideration by Senate Health, Education, Labor, and Pensions; House Education and the Workforce; Passed the Senate on March 19, 2003 (Passed (voice vote)); Passed the House on March 26, 2003 (Passed (voice vote)); Reported by the joint conference committee on June 12, 2003; agreed to by the House on June 17, 2003 (Agreed (voice vote)); Signed into law by President George W. Bush on June 25, 2003

Keeping Children and Families Safe Act of 2003 (Pub. L. 108–36 (text) (PDF)) was an American federal legislation (108th Congress (2003-2004)) reauthorizing the Child Abuse Prevention and Treatment Act, the Adoption Opportunities Act, the Abandoned Infants Assistance Act, and the Family Violence Prevention and Services Act.

== Purpose ==
The committee had three general goals for this legislation:

- to encourage new training and better qualifications for CPS workers;
- to encourage links between agencies to better improve services for children; and
- to strengthen initiatives to prevent child abuse and neglect.

== S.342 ==
S.342 - Keeping Children and Families Safe Act of 2003:

Sponsor:	Sen. Gregg, Judd [R-NH] (Introduced 02/11/2003)
Committees:	Senate - Health, Education, Labor, and Pensions
Committee Reports:	S. Rept. 108–12; H. Rept. 108-150 (Conference Report)
Latest Action:	06/25/2003 Became Public Law No: 108-36.
Roll Call Votes:	There has been 1 roll call vote

The Senate version of the bill contains much of the same language, but there are some significant differences. For example, the House bill requires hospitals to report to child protective services the birth of a fetal alcohol or drug-exposed infant, and referral of the infant for evaluation for developmental disabilities to the State's early intervention program provided by a Part C agency. The Senate version requires referral "as appropriate" for infants affected by illegal substance abuse, but not including fetal alcohol abuse.

== See also ==
- Violence Against Women Act
- Domestic violence in the United States
- Family Violence Prevention and Services Act
