= Money marriage =

Type of marriage

Money marriage refers to a marriage where a girl, usually, is married off to a man to settle debts owed by her parents. The female is referred as a money wife. Money marriage is known to be a practice in Becheve, in southern Nigeria in Cross River State, where girls as young as three get married in such a way.

The practice of Money Woman locally known as 'Ukey Egole' was seen as legitimate wife of the man because typical Becheve Man was not considered a complete man without having a 'Money Woman'.

But the way the case was reported was misunderstood by many, reason being that the right channel of enquiry was not followed, which is meeting with the elders of the host Becheve community to give them an exegesis of the matter on how it emanated.

The tradition is said to still be practiced despite being illegal in Nigeria.
