= Guardians of the Children Canada =

Canadian Charitable founded in 2014

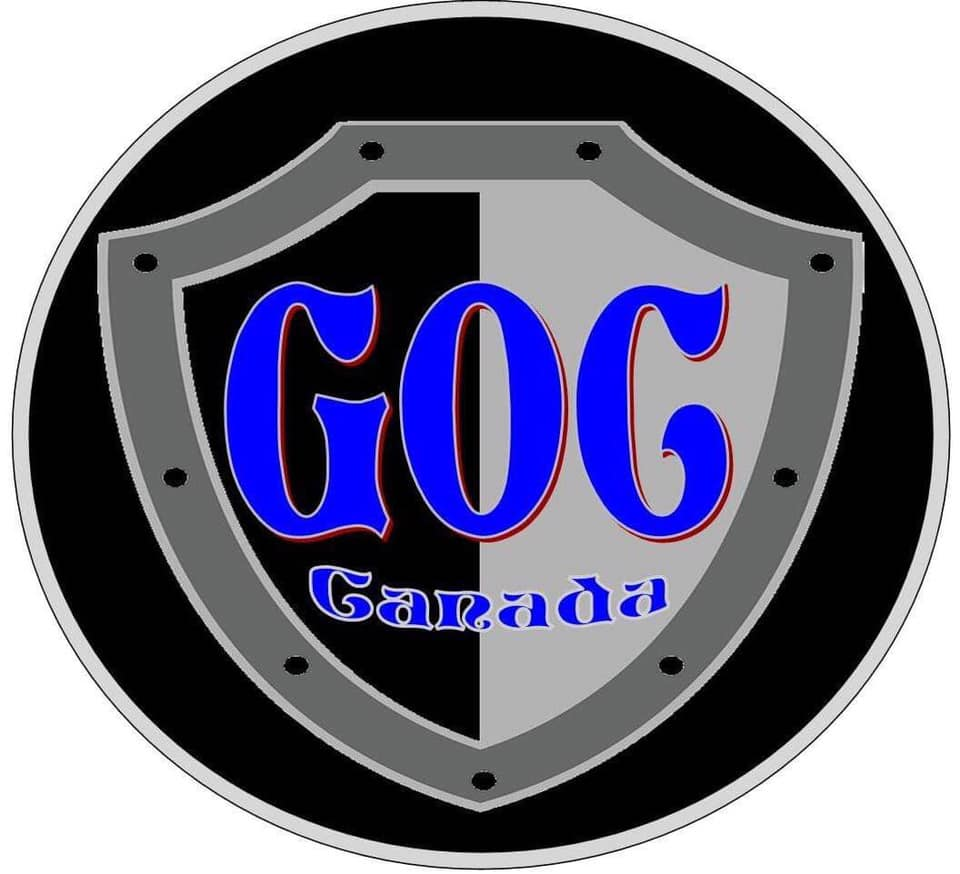
- Established: 2014
- Founded at: Winnipeg, Manitoba, Canada
- Purpose: To create a safer environment for all children
- Services: Education, Support and protection for abused children
- Website: www.guardiansofthechildren.com//

Guardians of the Children Canada (French: Gardiens Des Enfants Canada) is a Canadian Charitable founded in 2014 Winnipeg, Manitoba Canada. As of 2019, the organization had members in five Canadian provinces. The organization is composed of chapters of recreational motorcyclists across Canada. Each chapter works locally with children and parents to help victims and raise awareness of child abuse and bullying.

== Charity Work & Activities ==
The organization partners with child advocacy agencies, victim assistance groups and schools to raise awareness and provide education on child abuse as well as the anti-bullying movement. They offer support "at any time, day or night, in any way they can." Members in each provincial chapter hold annual "Children Empowerment Rides" with all local motorcyclists also encouraged to take part. Members also attend local events such as parades, comic book conventions, and other organized events to raise awareness and obtain donations to assist children who have been – or are being – abused, and visit local schools to help educate on abuse and bullying. Members will typically attended court proceedings to support the victims. The group says its mission is to educate the public about child abuse and "to provide strength and stability to families in crisis."
