= Karly's Law =

Child abuse investigation law in Oregon, US

Karly’s Law is a law that reformed child abuse investigation standards and procedures in the state of Oregon. Karly’s Law is named for a three-year-old girl, Karly Sheehan, who died as a result of child abuse and neglect in 2005.

== Background ==
Karly's Law was first introduced as House Bill 3328 in 2007. It was created as a result of the death of Karly Sheehan in 2005. Karly was a three-year-old girl who died as a result of neglect and abuse from her mother's boyfriend, Shawn Wesley Field. Her situation was brought to the attention of the Department of Health and Human Services as well as Law Enforcement, who interviewed Karly's mother, father and her mother's significant other twice and concluded that her injuries were not a result of child abuse.

== Procedural history ==
The bill was proposed and sponsored by Rep Sara Gelser in 2007. It passed the Oregon House of Representatives unanimously on 30 April 2007, where it went on to the Oregon state Senate Human Services Committee. The Oregon Senate also passed the bill unanimously, and it was sent back to the House with minor clarifying amendments. The House passed these amendments, and Gov. Ted Kulongoski signed them into law.

== Law requirements ==
The law mandates that children with suspicious injuries during the course of an abuse investigation receive medical treatment within 48 hours. The Oregon Department of Human Services and trained medical providers are to assess the injuries. The law sets protocol and procedures if abuse is suspected.

== Legacy ==
After Karly's law was passed, the quantity of children who have been assessed for abuse in the state of Oregon rose by 140%. This does not imply a rise in the child abuse rates in the State of Oregon, simply that the number of children being inspected for possible child abuse-related injuries has gone up. In 2009, Oregon had 67,885 total referrals for child abuse and neglect. Of those, 28,584 reports were referred for investigation. Prior to the passage of HR 3328 in 2007, these numbers were: 46,524 total referrals for child abuse and neglect, 23,529 were referred for investigation in 2004.
