= Outcry witness =

Person who first hears an abuse allegation

In United States criminal law, an outcry witness is the person who first hears an allegation of abuse made by a child or another victim of abuse or sexual crime. The witness is legally obligated to report the abuse, and may be called upon during the trial proceedings.

== Hearsay ==
The problem with outcry witnesses, legally speaking, is that they are often considered hearsay evidence. Generally speaking, hearsay is not admissible in a court hearing or trial, unless it meets certain criteria, which can change from state to state.

For example, in the 1997 Illinois case People vs Holloway, the defendant took the case to appeal on the basis that one of the witnesses to appear at the trial was a hearsay witness: the witness was not present for the incident and didn't directly see or hear the incident. However, the Illinois Supreme Court ruled that a 1982 outcry law applied when the victim was under 13 years old at the time of the offense. In the case of Holloway, the victim told a friend about the incident at a slumber party, nearly two years after the abuse occurred. The defendant was subsequently convicted of the sexual abuse.

In other states, different laws have been created. Texas allows testimony from the first person the victim reported the crime to, and the outcry witness must be over the age of 18.

California has more general hearsay exceptions, including PC 273(d), which specifically address child abuse, along with a long list of items, such as confessions, mental health, and deathbed statements.
