= List of acts of the 108th United States Congress =

The acts of the 108th United States Congress includes all Acts of Congress and ratified treaties by the 108th United States Congress, which lasted from January 3, 2003, to January 3, 2005.

Acts include public and private laws, which are enacted after being passed by Congress and signed by the President, however if the President vetoes a bill it can still be enacted by a two-thirds vote in both houses. The Senate alone considers treaties, which are ratified by a two-thirds vote.

== Summary of actions ==
President George W. Bush did not veto any bills during this Congress.

== Public laws ==
Public law number (Linked to Wikisource)	Date of enactment	Official short title	Description	Link to Legislink.org
108-1	January 8, 2003	(No short title)	An act to provide for a 5-month extension of the Temporary Extended Unemployment Compensation Act of 2002 and for a transition period for individuals receiving compensation when the program under such Act ends	Pub. L. 108–1 (text) (PDF)
108-2	January 10, 2003	(No short title)	Joint resolution making further continuing appropriations for the fiscal year 2003, and for other purposes	Pub. L. 108–2 (text) (PDF)
108-3	January 13, 2003	National Flood Insurance Program Reauthorization Act of 2003	An act to extend the national flood insurance program	Pub. L. 108–3 (text) (PDF)
108-4	January 31, 2003	(No short title)	Joint resolution making further continuing appropriations for the fiscal year 2003, and for other purposes	Pub. L. 108–4 (text) (PDF)
108-5	February 7, 2003	(No short title)	Joint resolution making further continuing appropriations for the fiscal year 2003, and for other purposes	Pub. L. 108–5 (text) (PDF)
108-6	February 13, 2003	(No short title)	An act to authorize salary adjustments for Justices and judges of the United States for fiscal year 2003	Pub. L. 108–6 (text) (PDF)
108-7	February 20, 2003	Consolidated Appropriations Resolution, 2003	Joint resolution making consolidated appropriations for the fiscal year ending September 30, 2003, and for other purposes	Pub. L. 108–7 (text) (PDF)
108-8	February 25, 2003	(No short title)	An act to improve the calculation of the Federal subsidy rate with respect to certain small business loans, and for other purposes	Pub. L. 108–8 (text) (PDF)
108-9	March 6, 2003	(No short title)	Joint resolution recognizing the 92d birthday of Ronald Reagan	Pub. L. 108–9 (text) (PDF)
108-10	March 11, 2003	Do-Not-Call Implementation Act	An act to authorize the Federal Trade Commission to collect fees for the implementation and enforcement of a "do-not-call" registry, and for other purposes	Pub. L. 108–10 (text) (PDF)
108-11	April 16, 2003	Emergency Wartime Supplemental Appropriations Act, 2003	An act making emergency wartime supplemental appropriations for the fiscal year 2003, and for other purposes	Pub. L. 108–11 (text) (PDF)
108-12	April 22, 2003	(No short title)	An act to reinstate and extend the deadline for commencement of construction of a hydroelectric project in the State of Illinois	Pub. L. 108–12 (text) (PDF)
108-13	April 22, 2003	(No short title)	An act to rename the Guam South Elementary/Middle School of the Department of Defense Domestic Dependents Elementary and Secondary Schools System in honor of Navy Commander William "Willie" McCool, who was the pilot of the Space Shuttle Columbia when it was tragically lost on February 1, 2003	Pub. L. 108–13 (text) (PDF)
108-14	April 23, 2003	(No short title)	An act to designate the Federal building located at 290 Broadway in New York, New York, as the "Ted Weiss Federal Building"	Pub. L. 108–14 (text) (PDF)
108-15	April 23, 2003	American 5-Cent Coin Design Continuity Act of 2003	An act to ensure continuity for the design of the 5-cent coin, establish the Citizens Coinage Advisory Committee, and for other purposes	Pub. L. 108–15 (text) (PDF)
108-16	April 23, 2003	Nutria Eradication and Control Act of 2003	An act to provide for the eradication and control of nutria in Maryland and Louisiana	Pub. L. 108–16 (text) (PDF)
108-17	April 23, 2003	(No short title)	An act to designate the facility of the United States Postal Service located at 2127 Beatties Ford Road in Charlotte, North Carolina, as the "Jim Richardson Post Office"	Pub. L. 108–17 (text) (PDF)
108-18	April 23, 2003	Postal Civil Service Retirement System Funding Reform Act of 2003	An act to amend chapter 83 of title 5, United States Code, to reform the funding of benefits under the Civil Service Retirement System for employees of the United States Postal Service, and for other purposes	Pub. L. 108–18 (text) (PDF)
108-19	April 25, 2003	Clean Diamond Trade Act	An act to implement effective measures to stop trade in conflict diamonds, and for other purposes	Pub. L. 108–19 (text) (PDF)
108-20	April 30, 2003	Smallpox Emergency Personnel Protection Act of 2003	An act to provide benefits and other compensation for certain individuals with injuries resulting from administration of smallpox countermeasures, and for other purposes	Pub. L. 108–20 (text) (PDF)
108-21	April 30, 2003	Prosecutorial Remedies and Other Tools to end the Exploitation of Children Today Act of 2003	An act to prevent child abduction and the sexual exploitation of children, and for other purposes	Pub. L. 108–21 (text) (PDF)
108-22	May 14, 2003	Gila River Indian Community Judgment Fund Distribution Act of 2003	An act to provide for the use and distribution of certain funds awarded to the Gila River Pima-Maricopa Indian Community, and for other purposes	Pub. L. 108–22 (text) (PDF)
108-23	May 19, 2003	Ottawa National Wildlife Refuge Complex Expansion and Detroit River International Wildlife Refuge Expansion Act	An act to expand the boundaries of the Ottawa National Wildlife Refuge Complex and the Detroit River International Wildlife Refuge	Pub. L. 108–23 (text) (PDF)
108-24	May 27, 2003	(No short title)	Joint resolution increasing the statutory limit on the public debt	Pub. L. 108–24 (text) (PDF)
108-25	May 27, 2003	United States Leadership Against HIV/AIDS, Tuberculosis, and Malaria Act of 2003	An act to provide assistance to foreign countries to combat HIV/AIDS, tuberculosis, and malaria, and for other purposes	Pub. L. 108–25 (text) (PDF)
108-26	May 28, 2003	Unemployment Compensation Amendments of 2003	An act to extend the Temporary Extended Unemployment Compensation Act of 2002	Pub. L. 108–26 (text) (PDF)
108-27	May 28, 2003	Jobs and Growth Tax Relief Reconciliation Act of 2003	An act to provide for reconciliation pursuant to section 201 of the concurrent resolution on the budget for fiscal year 2004	Pub. L. 108–27 (text) (PDF)
108-28	May 29, 2003	(No short title)	An act concerning participation of Taiwan in the World Health Organization	Pub. L. 108–28 (text) (PDF)
108-29	May 29, 2003	Veterans' Memorial Preservation and Recognition Act of 2003	An act to further the protection and recognition of veterans' memorials, and for other purposes	Pub. L. 108–29 (text) (PDF)
108-30	May 29, 2003	(No short title)	An act to amend the Richard B. Russell National School Lunch Act to extend the availability of funds to carry out the fruit and vegetable pilot program	Pub. L. 108–30 (text) (PDF)
108-31	June 17, 2003	(No short title)	An act to amend the Microenterprise for Self-Reliance Act of 2000 and the Foreign Assistance Act of 1961 to increase assistance for the poorest people in developing countries under microenterprise assistance programs under those Acts, and for other purposes	Pub. L. 108–31 (text) (PDF)
108-32	June 17, 2003	Grand Teton National Park Land Exchange Act	An act to provide for the expeditious completion of the acquisition of land owned by the State of Wyoming within the boundaries of Grand Teton National Park, and for other purposes	Pub. L. 108–32 (text) (PDF)
108-33	June 23, 2003	(No short title)	An act to designate the facility of the United States Postal Service located at 1114 Main Avenue in Clifton, New Jersey, as the "Robert P. Hammer Post Office Building"	Pub. L. 108–33 (text) (PDF)
108-34	June 23, 2003	Zuni Indian Tribe Water Rights Settlement Act of 2003	An act to approve the settlement of the water rights claims of the Zuni Indian Tribe in Apache County, Arizona, and for other purposes	Pub. L. 108–34 (text) (PDF)
108-35	June 23, 2003	(No short title)	An act to designate the Federal building and United States courthouse located at 46 East Ohio Street in Indianapolis, Indiana, as the "Birch Bayh Federal Building and United States Courthouse"	Pub. L. 108–35 (text) (PDF)
108-36	June 25, 2003	Keeping Children and Families Safe Act of 2003	An act to amend the Child Abuse Prevention and Treatment Act to make improvements to and reauthorize programs under that Act, and for other purposes	Pub. L. 108–36 (text) (PDF)
108-37	June 26, 2003	(No short title)	An act to designate the regional headquarters building for the National Park Service under construction in Omaha, Nebraska, as the "Carl T. Curtis National Park Service Midwest Regional Headquarters Building"	Pub. L. 108–37 (text) (PDF)
108-38	June 26, 2003	(No short title)	Joint resolution expressing the sense of Congress with respect to raising awareness and encouraging prevention of sexual assault in the United States and supporting the goals and ideals of National Sexual Assault Awareness and Prevention Month	Pub. L. 108–38 (text) (PDF)
108-39	June 30, 2003	ORBIT Technical Corrections Act of 2003	An act to amend the Communications Satellite Act of 1962 to provide for the orderly dilution of the ownership interest in Inmarsat by former signatories to the Inmarsat Operating Agreement	Pub. L. 108–39 (text) (PDF)
108-40	June 30, 2003	Welfare Reform Extension Act of 2003	An act to reauthorize the Temporary Assistance for Needy Families block grant program through fiscal year 2003, and for other purposes	Pub. L. 108–40 (text) (PDF)
108-41	July 1, 2003	Automatic Defibrillation in Adam's Memory Act	An act to authorize the use of certain grant funds to establish an information clearinghouse that provides information to increase public access to defibrillation in schools	Pub. L. 108–41 (text) (PDF)
108-42	July 1, 2003	San Gabriel River Watershed Study Act	An act to authorize the Secretary of the Interior to conduct a study of the San Gabriel River Watershed, and for other purposes	Pub. L. 108–42 (text) (PDF)
108-43	July 1, 2003	Glen Canyon National Recreation Area Boundary Revision Act	An act to revise the boundary of the Glen Canyon National Recreation Area in the States of Utah and Arizona	Pub. L. 108–43 (text) (PDF)
108-44	July 3, 2003	Accountant, Compliance, and Enforcement Staffing Act of 2003	An act to provide for the protection of investors, increase confidence in the capital markets system, and fully implement the Sarbanes-Oxley Act of 2002 by streamlining the hiring process for certain employment positions in the Securities and Exchange Commission	Pub. L. 108–44 (text) (PDF)
108-45	July 3, 2003	Strengthen AmeriCorps Program Act	An act to improve the manner in which the Corporation for National and Community Service approves, and records obligations relating to, national service positions	Pub. L. 108–45 (text) (PDF)
108-46	July 14, 2003	(No short title)	An act to redesignate the facility of the United States Postal Service located at 7401 West 100th Place in Bridgeview, Illinois, as the "Michael J. Healy Post Office Building"	Pub. L. 108–46 (text) (PDF)
108-47	July 14, 2003	(No short title)	An act to designate the facility of the United States Postal Service located at 1830 South Lake Drive in Lexington, South Carolina, as the "Floyd Spence Post Office Building"	Pub. L. 108–47 (text) (PDF)
108-48	July 14, 2003	(No short title)	An act to redesignate the facility of the United States Postal Service located at 1859 South Ashland Avenue in Chicago, Illinois, as the "Cesar Chavez Post Office"	Pub. L. 108–48 (text) (PDF)
108-49	July 14, 2003	(No short title)	An act to designate the facility of the United States Postal Service located at 141 Erie Street in Linesville, Pennsylvania, as the "James R. Merry Post Office"	Pub. L. 108–49 (text) (PDF)
108-50	July 14, 2003	(No short title)	An act to designate the facility of the United States Postal Service located at 111 West Washington Street in Bowling Green, Ohio, as the "Delbert L. Latta Post Office Building"	Pub. L. 108–50 (text) (PDF)
108-51	July 14, 2003	(No short title)	An act to designate the facility of the United States Postal Service located at 1901 West Evans Street in Florence, South Carolina, as the "Dr. Roswell N. Beck Post Office Building"	Pub. L. 108–51 (text) (PDF)
108-52	July 14, 2003	(No short title)	An act to designate the facility of the United States Postal Service located at 7554 Pacific Avenue in Stockton, California, as the "Norman D. Shumway Post Office Building"	Pub. L. 108–52 (text) (PDF)
108-53	July 14, 2003	(No short title)	An act to designate the facility of the United States Postal Service located at 4832 East Highway 27 in Iron Station, North Carolina, as the "General Charles Gabriel Post Office"	Pub. L. 108–53 (text) (PDF)
108-54	July 14, 2003	(No short title)	An act to designate the facility of the United States Postal Service located at 2318 Woodson Road in St. Louis, Missouri, as the "Timothy Michael Gaffney Post Office Building"	Pub. L. 108–54 (text) (PDF)
108-55	July 14, 2003	(No short title)	An act to redesignate the facility of the United States Postal Service located at 201 West Boston Street in Brookfield, Missouri, as the "Admiral Donald Davis Post Office Building"	Pub. L. 108–55 (text) (PDF)
108-56	July 14, 2003	(No short title)	An act to designate the facility of the United States Postal Service located at 1502 East Kiest Boulevard in Dallas, Texas, as the "Dr. Caesar A.W. Clark, Sr. Post Office Building"	Pub. L. 108–56 (text) (PDF)
108-57	July 14, 2003	(No short title)	An act to designate the facility of the United States Postal Service located at 120 Baldwin Avenue in Paia, Maui, Hawaii, as the "Patsy Takemoto Mink Post Office Building"	Pub. L. 108–57 (text) (PDF)
108-58	July 14, 2003	(No short title)	An act to authorize the Congressional Hunger Center to award Bill Emerson and Mickey Leland Hunger Fellowships for fiscal years 2003 and 2004	Pub. L. 108–58 (text) (PDF)
108-59	July 14, 2003	(No short title)	An act to extend the Abraham Lincoln Bicentennial Commission, and for other purposes	Pub. L. 108–59 (text) (PDF)
108-60	July 17, 2003	(No short title)	An act to award a congressional gold medal to Prime Minister Tony Blair	Pub. L. 108–60 (text) (PDF)
108-61	July 28, 2003	Burmese Freedom and Democracy Act of 2003	An act to sanction the ruling Burmese military junta, to strengthen Burma's democratic forces and support and recognize the National League of Democracy as the legitimate representative of the Burmese people, and for other purposes	Pub. L. 108–61 (text) (PDF)
108-62	July 29, 2003	(No short title)	An act to authorize the Secretary of the Interior to grant an easement to facilitate access to the Lewis and Clark Interpretative Center in Nebraska City, Nebraska	Pub. L. 108–62 (text) (PDF)
108-63	July 29, 2003	McLoughlin House Addition to Fort Vancouver National Historic Site Act	An act to authorize the Secretary of the Interior to acquire the McLoughlin House in Oregon City, Oregon, for inclusion in Fort Vancouver National Historic Site, and for other purposes	Pub. L. 108–63 (text) (PDF)
108-64	July 29, 2003	(No short title)	An act to designate the visitor center in Organ Pipe Cactus National Monument in Arizona as the "Kris Eggle Visitor Center", and for other purposes	Pub. L. 108–64 (text) (PDF)
108-65	July 29, 2003	(No short title)	An act to redesignate the facility of the United States Postal Service located at 101 South Vine Street in Glenwood, Iowa, as the "William J. Scherle Post Office Building"	Pub. L. 108–65 (text) (PDF)
108-66	July 30, 2003	(No short title)	An act to provide that certain Bureau of Land Management land shall be held in trust for the Pueblo of Santa Clara and the Pueblo of San Ildefonso in the State of New Mexico	Pub. L. 108–66 (text) (PDF)
108-67	August 1, 2003	(No short title)	An act to direct the Secretary of Agriculture to convey certain land in the Lake Tahoe Basin Management Unit, Nevada, to the Secretary of the Interior, in trust for the Washoe Indian Tribe of Nevada and California	Pub. L. 108–67 (text) (PDF)
108-68	August 1, 2003	(No short title)	An act to amend the PROTECT Act to clarify certain volunteer liability	Pub. L. 108–68 (text) (PDF)
108-69	August 8, 2003	Emergency Supplemental Appropriations for Disaster Relief Act, 2003	An act making emergency supplemental appropriations for the fiscal year ending September 30, 2003	Pub. L. 108–69 (text) (PDF)
108-70	August 14, 2003	(No short title)	An act to designate the building located at 1 Federal Plaza in New York, New York, as the "James L. Watson United States Court of International Trade Building"	Pub. L. 108–70 (text) (PDF)
108-71	August 14, 2003	(No short title)	An act to designate the facility of the United States Postal Service located at 9350 East Corporate Hill Drive in Wichita, Kansas, as the "Garner E. Shriver Post Office Building"	Pub. L. 108–71 (text) (PDF)
108-72	August 15, 2003	Smithsonian Facilities Authorization Act	An act to provide for additional space and resources for national collections held by the Smithsonian Institution, and for other purposes	Pub. L. 108–72 (text) (PDF)
108-73	August 15, 2003	Family Farmer Bankruptcy Relief Act of 2003	An act to extend for six months the period for which chapter 12 of title 11 of the United States Code is reenacted	Pub. L. 108–73 (text) (PDF)
108-74	August 15, 2003	(No short title)	An act to amend title XXI of the Social Security Act to extend the availability of allotments for fiscal years 1998 through 2001 under the State Children's Health Insurance Program, and for other purposes	Pub. L. 108–74 (text) (PDF)
108-75	August 15, 2003	Mosquito Abatement for Safety and Health Act	An act to authorize grants through the Centers for Disease Control and Prevention for mosquito control programs to prevent mosquito-borne diseases, and for other purposes	Pub. L. 108–75 (text) (PDF)
108-76	August 18, 2003	Higher Education Relief Opportunities for Students Act of 2003	An act to provide the Secretary of Education with specific waiver authority to respond to a war or other military operation or national emergency	Pub. L. 108–76 (text) (PDF)
108-77	September 3, 2003	United States-Chile Free Trade Agreement Implementation Act	An act to implement the United States-Chile Free Trade Agreement	Pub. L. 108–77 (text) (PDF)
108-78	September 3, 2003	United States- Singapore Free Trade Agreement Implementation Act	An act to implement the United States-Singapore Free Trade Agreement	Pub. L. 108–78 (text) (PDF)
108-79	September 4, 2003	Prison Rape Elimination Act of 2003	An act to provide for the analysis of the incidence and effects of prison rape in Federal, State, and local institutions and to provide information, resources, recommendations, and funding to protect individuals from prison rape	Pub. L. 108–79 (text) (PDF)
108-80	September 17, 2003	(No short title)	An act to designate the United States courthouse located at 101 North Fifth Street in Muskogee, Oklahoma, as the "Ed Edmondson United States Courthouse"	Pub. L. 108–80 (text) (PDF)
108-81	September 25, 2003	Museum and Library Services Act of 2003	An act to reauthorize the Museum and Library Services Act, and for other purposes	Pub. L. 108–81 (text) (PDF)
108-82	September 29, 2003	(No short title)	An act to ratify the authority of the Federal Trade Commission to establish a do-not-call registry	Pub. L. 108–82 (text) (PDF)
108-83	September 30, 2003	Legislative Branch Appropriations Act, 2004	An act making appropriations for the Legislative Branch for the fiscal year ending September 30, 2004, and for other purposes	Pub. L. 108–83 (text) (PDF)
108-84	September 30, 2003	(No short title)	Joint resolution making continuing appropriations for the fiscal year 2004, and for other purposes	Pub. L. 108–84 (text) (PDF)
108-85	September 30, 2003	Fremont-Madison Conveyance Act	An act to authorize the Secretary of the Interior to convey certain facilities to the Fremont-Madison Irrigation District in the State of Idaho	Pub. L. 108–85 (text) (PDF)
108-86	September 30, 2003	Postmasters Equity Act of 2003	An act to amend chapter 10 of title 39, United States Code, to include postmasters and postmasters' organizations in the process for the development and planning of certain policies, schedules, and programs, and for other purposes	Pub. L. 108–86 (text) (PDF)
108-87	September 30, 2003	Department of Defense Appropriations Act, 2004	An act making appropriations for the Department of Defense for the fiscal year ending September 30, 2004, and for other purposes	Pub. L. 108–87 (text) (PDF)
108-88	September 30, 2003	Surface Transportation Extension Act of 2003	An act to provide an extension of highway, highway safety, motor carrier safety, transit, and other programs funded out of the Highway Trust Fund pending enactment of a law reauthorizing the Transportation Equity Act for the 21st Century	Pub. L. 108–88 (text) (PDF)
108-89	October 1, 2003	(No short title)	An act to extend the Temporary Assistance for Needy Families block grant program, and certain tax and trade programs, and for other purposes	Pub. L. 108–89 (text) (PDF)
108-90	October 1, 2003	Department of Homeland Security Appropriations Act, 2004	An act making appropriations for the Department of Homeland Security for the fiscal year ending September 30, 2004, and for other purposes	Pub. L. 108–90 (text) (PDF)
108-91	October 3, 2003	Hospital Mortgage Insurance Act of 2003	An act to amend section 242 of the National Housing Act regarding the requirements for mortgage insurance under such Act for hospitals	Pub. L. 108–91 (text) (PDF)
108-92	October 3, 2003	(No short title)	An act to amend chapter 84 of title 5, United States Code, to provide that certain Federal annuity computations are adjusted by 1 percentage point relating to periods of receiving disability payments, and for other purposes	Pub. L. 108–92 (text) (PDF)
108-93	October 3, 2003	(No short title)	An act to direct the Secretary of the Interior to conduct a special resource study to determine the national significance of the Miami Circle site in the State of Florida as well as the suitability and feasibility of its inclusion in the National Park System as part of Biscayne National Park, and for other purposes	Pub. L. 108–93 (text) (PDF)
108-94	October 3, 2003	Coltsville Study Act of 2003	An act to direct the Secretary of the Interior to conduct a study of Coltsville in the State of Connecticut for potential inclusion in the National Park System	Pub. L. 108–94 (text) (PDF)
108-95	October 3, 2003	Mount Naomi Wilderness Boundary Adjustment Act	An act to make certain adjustments to the boundaries of the Mount Naomi Wilderness Area, and for other purposes	Pub. L. 108–95 (text) (PDF)
108-96	October 10, 2003	Runaway, Homeless, and Missing Children Protection Act	An act to reauthorize programs under the Runaway and Homeless Youth Act and the Missing Children's Assistance Act, and for other purposes	Pub. L. 108–96 (text) (PDF)
108-97	October 10, 2003	(No short title)	An act to designate the facility of the United States Postal Service located at 1000 Avenida Sanchez Osorio in Carolina, Puerto Rico, as the "Roberto Clemente Walker Post Office Building"	Pub. L. 108–97 (text) (PDF)
108-98	October 10, 2003	(No short title)	An act to amend the Higher Education Act of 1965 with respect to the qualifications of foreign schools	Pub. L. 108–98 (text) (PDF)
108-99	October 15, 2003	(No short title)	An act to amend the Immigration and Nationality Act to extend for an additional 5 years the special immigrant religious worker program	Pub. L. 108–99 (text) (PDF)
108-100	October 28, 2003	Check Clearing for the 21st Century Act	An act to facilitate check truncation by authorizing substitute checks, to foster innovation in the check collection system without mandating receipt of checks in electronic form, and to improve the overall efficiency of the Nation's payments system, and for other purposes	Pub. L. 108–100 (text) (PDF)
108-101	October 29, 2003	(No short title)	An act to award a congressional gold medal to Jackie Robinson (posthumously), in recognition of his many contributions to the Nation, and to express the sense of the Congress that there should be a national day in recognition of Jackie Robinson	Pub. L. 108–101 (text) (PDF)
108-102	October 29, 2003	(No short title)	An act to amend title 44, United States Code, to transfer to the Public Printer the authority over the individuals responsible for preparing indexes of the Congressional Record, and for other purposes	Pub. L. 108–102 (text) (PDF)
108-103	October 29, 2003	(No short title)	An act to redesignate the facility of the United States Postal Service located at 48 South Broadway, Nyack, New York, as the "Edward O'Grady, Waverly Brown, Peter Paige Post Office Building"	Pub. L. 108–103 (text) (PDF)
108-104	October 31, 2003	(No short title)	Joint resolution making further continuing appropriations for the fiscal year 2004, and for other purposes	Pub. L. 108–104 (text) (PDF)
108-105	November 5, 2003	Partial-Birth Abortion Ban Act of 2003	An act to prohibit the procedure commonly known as partial-birth abortion	Pub. L. 108–105 (text) (PDF)
108-106	November 6, 2003	Emergency Supplemental Appropriations Act for Defense and for the Reconstruction of Iraq and Afghanistan, 2004	An act making emergency supplemental appropriations for defense and for the reconstruction of Iraq and Afghanistan for the fiscal year ending September 30, 2004, and for other purposes	Pub. L. 108–106 (text) (PDF)
108-107	November 7, 2003	(No short title)	Joint resolution making further continuing appropriations for the fiscal year 2004, and for other purposes	Pub. L. 108–107 (text) (PDF)
108-108	November 10, 2003	Department of the Interior and Related Agencies Appropriations Act, 2004	An act making appropriations for the Department of the Interior and related agencies for the fiscal year ending September 30, 2004, and for other purposes	Pub. L. 108–108 (text) (PDF)
108-109	November 11, 2003	National Cemetery Expansion Act of 2003	An act to provide for the establishment by the Secretary of Veterans Affairs of additional cemeteries in the National Cemetery Administration	Pub. L. 108–109 (text) (PDF)
108-110	November 11, 2003	(No short title)	An act to redesignate the facility of the United States Postal Service located at 120 East Ritchie Avenue in Marceline, Missouri, as the "Walt Disney Post Office Building"	Pub. L. 108–110 (text) (PDF)
108-111	November 11, 2003	(No short title)	An act to designate the facility of the United States Postal Service located at 440 South Orange Blossom Trail in Orlando, Florida, as the "Arthur `Pappy' Kennedy Post Office"	Pub. L. 108–111 (text) (PDF)
108-112	November 11, 2003	(No short title)	An act to designate the facility of the United States Postal Service located at 1905 West Blue Heron Boulevard in West Palm Beach, Florida, as the "Judge Edward Rodgers Post Office Building"	Pub. L. 108–112 (text) (PDF)
108-113	November 11, 2003	(No short title)	An act to designate the facility of the United States Postal Service located at 1101 Colorado Street in Boulder City, Nevada, as the "Bruce Woodbury Post Office Building"	Pub. L. 108–113 (text) (PDF)
108-114	November 11, 2003	(No short title)	An act to designate the facility of the United States Postal Service located at 2300 Redondo Avenue in Long Beach, California, as the "Stephen Horn Post Office Building"	Pub. L. 108–114 (text) (PDF)
108-115	November 11, 2003	(No short title)	An act to designate the facility of the United States Postal Service located at 2001 East Willard Street in Philadelphia, Pennsylvania, as the "Robert A. Borski Post Office Building"	Pub. L. 108–115 (text) (PDF)
108-116	November 11, 2003	(No short title)	An act to designate the facility of the United States Postal Service located at 1210 Highland Avenue in Duarte, California, as the "Francisco A. Martinez Flores Post Office"	Pub. L. 108–116 (text) (PDF)
108-117	November 11, 2003	(No short title)	An act to designate the facility of the United States Postal Service located at 339 Hicksville Road in Bethpage, New York, as the "Brian C. Hickey Post Office Building"	Pub. L. 108–117 (text) (PDF)
108-118	November 11, 2003	(No short title)	An act to designate the facility of the United States Postal Service located at 10701 Abercorn Street in Savannah, Georgia, as the "J.C. Lewis, Jr. Post Office Building"	Pub. L. 108–118 (text) (PDF)
108-119	November 11, 2003	(No short title)	An act to designate the facility of the United States Postal Service located at 141 Weston Street in Hartford, Connecticut, as the "Barbara B. Kennelly Post Office Building"	Pub. L. 108–119 (text) (PDF)
108-120	November 11, 2003	(No short title)	An act to designate the facility of the United States Postal Service located at 135 East Olive Avenue in Burbank, California, as the "Bob Hope Post Office Building"	Pub. L. 108–120 (text) (PDF)
108-121	November 11, 2003	Military Family Tax Relief Act of 2003	An act to amend title 10, United States Code, and the Internal Revenue Code of 1986 to increase the death gratuity payable with respect to deceased members of the Armed Forces and to exclude such gratuity from gross income, to provide additional tax relief for members of the Armed Forces and their families, and for other purposes	Pub. L. 108–121 (text) (PDF)
108-122	November 11, 2003	(No short title)	Joint resolution recognizing the Dr. Samuel D. Harris National Museum of Dentistry, an affiliate of the Smithsonian Institution in Baltimore, Maryland, as the official national museum of dentistry in the United States	Pub. L. 108–122 (text) (PDF)
108-123	November 11, 2003	Federal Employee Student Loan Assistance Act	An act to amend section 5379 of title 5, United States Code, to increase the annual and aggregate limits on student loan repayments by Federal agencies	Pub. L. 108–123 (text) (PDF)
108-124	November 11, 2003	(No short title)	An act to designate the facility of the United States Postal Service located at 1601-1 Main Street in Jacksonville, Florida, as the "Eddie Mae Steward Post Office"	Pub. L. 108–124 (text) (PDF)
108-125	November 11, 2003	(No short title)	An act to extend the authority for the construction of a memorial to Martin Luther King Jr.	Pub. L. 108–125 (text) (PDF)
108-126	November 17, 2003	(No short title)	An act to authorize the design and construction of a visitor center for the Vietnam Veterans Memorial	Pub. L. 108–126 (text) (PDF)
108-127	November 17, 2003	(No short title)	An act to amend title XXI of the Social Security Act to make technical corrections with respect to the definition of qualifying State	Pub. L. 108–127 (text) (PDF)
108-128	November 17, 2003	Black Canyon of the Gunnison Boundary Revision Act of 2003	An act to revise the boundary of the Black Canyon of the Gunnison National Park and Gunnison Gorge National Conservation Area in the State of Colorado, and for other purposes	Pub. L. 108–128 (text) (PDF)
108-129	November 17, 2003	(No short title)	An act to authorize the exchange of lands between an Alaska Native Village Corporation and the Department of the Interior, and for other purposes	Pub. L. 108–129 (text) (PDF)
108-130	November 18, 2003	Animal Drug User Fee Act of 2003	An act to amend the Federal Food, Drug, and Cosmetic Act to establish a program of fees relating to animal drugs	Pub. L. 108–130 (text) (PDF)
108-131	November 22, 2003	Blackwater National Wildlife Refuge Expansion Act	An act to authorize the Secretary of the Interior to acquire the property in Cecil County, Maryland, known as Garrett Island for inclusion in the Blackwater National Wildlife Refuge	Pub. L. 108–131 (text) (PDF)
108-132	November 22, 2003	Military Construction Appropriations Act, 2004	An act making appropriations for military construction, family housing, and base realignment and closure for the Department of Defense for the fiscal year ending September 30, 2004, and for other purposes	Pub. L. 108–132 (text) (PDF)
108-133	November 22, 2003	District of Columbia Military Retirement Equity Act of 2003	An act to amend the Policemen and Firemen's Retirement and Disability Act to permit military service previously performed by members and former members of the Metropolitan Police Department of the District of Columbia, the Fire Department of the District of Columbia, the United States Park Police, and the United States Secret Service to count as creditable service for purposes of calculating retirement annuities payable to such members upon payment of a contribution by such members, and for other purposes	Pub. L. 108–133 (text) (PDF)
108-134	November 22, 2003	(No short title)	An act to reauthorize certain school lunch and child nutrition programs through March 31, 2004	Pub. L. 108–134 (text) (PDF)
108-135	November 22, 2003	(No short title)	Joint resolution making further continuing appropriations for the fiscal year 2004, and for other purposes	Pub. L. 108–135 (text) (PDF)
108-136	November 24, 2003	National Defense Authorization Act for Fiscal Year 2004	An act to authorize appropriations for fiscal year 2004 for military activities of the Department of Defense, for military construction, and for defense activities of the Department of Energy, to prescribe personnel strengths for such fiscal year for the Armed Forces, and for other purposes	Pub. L. 108–136 (text) (PDF)
108-137	December 1, 2003	Energy and Water Development Appropriations Act, 2004	An act making appropriations for energy and water development for the fiscal year ending September 30, 2004, and for other purposes	Pub. L. 108–137 (text) (PDF)
108-138	December 1, 2003	(No short title)	An act to correct a technical error from Unit T-07 of the John H. Chafee Coastal Barrier Resources System	Pub. L. 108–138 (text) (PDF)
108-139	December 1, 2003	(No short title)	Joint resolution commending the Inspectors General for their efforts to prevent and detect waste, fraud, abuse, and mismanagement, and to promote economy, efficiency, and effectiveness in the Federal Government during the past 25 years	Pub. L. 108–139 (text) (PDF)
108-140	December 1, 2003	(No short title)	Joint resolution recognizing the Agricultural Research Service of the United States Department of Agriculture for 50 years of outstanding service to the Nation through agricultural research	Pub. L. 108–140 (text) (PDF)
108-141	December 1, 2003	(No short title)	An act to redesignate the facility of the United States Postal Service, located at 315 Empire Boulevard in Crown Heights, Brooklyn, New York, as the "James E. Davis Post Office Building"	Pub. L. 108–141 (text) (PDF)
108-142	December 2, 2003	Kaloko-Honokohau National Historical Park Addition Act of 2003	An act to revise the boundary of the Kaloko-Honokohau National Historical Park in the State of Hawaii, and for other purposes	Pub. L. 108–142 (text) (PDF)
108-143	December 2, 2003	(No short title)	An act to designate the facility of the United States Postal Service located at 710 Wicks Lane in Billings, Montana, as the "Ronald Reagan Post Office Building"	Pub. L. 108–143 (text) (PDF)
108-144	December 2, 2003	(No short title)	An act to designate the facility of the United States Postal Service located at 3710 West 73rd Terrace in Prairie Village, Kansas, as the "Senator James B. Pearson Post Office"	Pub. L. 108–144 (text) (PDF)
108-145	December 2, 2003	Adoption Promotion Act of 2003	An act to reauthorize the adoption incentive payments program under part E of title IV of the Social Security Act, and for other purposes	Pub. L. 108–145 (text) (PDF)
108-146	December 3, 2003	Tornado Shelters Act	An act to amend the Housing and Community Development Act of 1974 to authorize communities to use community development block grant funds for construction of tornado-safe shelters in manufactured home parks	Pub. L. 108–146 (text) (PDF)
108-147	December 3, 2003	Veterans' Compensation Cost-of-Living Adjustment Act of 2003	An act to increase, effective as of December 1, 2003, the rates of disability compensation for veterans with service-connected disabilities and the rates of dependency and indemnity compensation for survivors of certain service-connected disabled veterans, and for other purposes	Pub. L. 108–147 (text) (PDF)
108-148	December 3, 2003	Healthy Forests Restoration Act of 2003	An act to improve the capacity of the Secretary of Agriculture and the Secretary of the Interior to conduct hazardous fuels reduction projects on National Forest System lands and Bureau of Land Management lands aimed at protecting communities, watersheds, and certain other at-risk lands from catastrophic wildfire, to enhance efforts to protect watersheds and address threats to forest and rangeland health, including catastrophic wildfire, across the landscape, and for other purposes	Pub. L. 108–148 (text) (PDF)
108-149	December 3, 2003	(No short title)	An act to designate the facility of the United States Postal Service located at 514 17th Street in Moline, Illinois, as the "David Bybee Post Office Building"	Pub. L. 108–149 (text) (PDF)
108-150	December 3, 2003	(No short title)	An act to designate the facility of the United States Postal Service located at 2650 Cleveland Avenue, NW in Canton, Ohio, as the "Richard D. Watkins Post Office Building"	Pub. L. 108–150 (text) (PDF)
108-151	December 3, 2003	(No short title)	An act to designate the facility of the United States Postal Service located at 3210 East 10th Street in Bloomington, Indiana, as the "Francis X. McCloskey Post Office Building"	Pub. L. 108–151 (text) (PDF)
108-152	December 3, 2003	Florida National Forest Land Management Act of 2003	An act to authorize the Secretary of Agriculture to sell or exchange certain land in the State of Florida, and for other purposes	Pub. L. 108–152 (text) (PDF)
108-153	December 3, 2003	21st Century Nanotechnology Research and Development Act	An act to authorize appropriations for nanoscience, nanoengineering, and nanotechnology research, and for other purposes	Pub. L. 108–153 (text) (PDF)
108-154	December 3, 2003	Birth Defects and Developmental Disabilities Prevention Act of 2003	An act to revise and extend the Birth Defects Prevention Act of 1998	Pub. L. 108–154 (text) (PDF)
108-155	December 3, 2003	Pediatric Research Equity Act of 2003	An act to amend the Federal Food, Drug, and Cosmetic Act to authorize the Food and Drug Administration to require certain research into drugs used in pediatric patients	Pub. L. 108–155 (text) (PDF)
108-156	December 3, 2003	Basic Pilot Program Extension and Expansion Act of 2003	An act to extend and expand the basic pilot program for employment eligibility verification, and for other purposes	Pub. L. 108–156 (text) (PDF)
108-157	December 3, 2003	(No short title)	An act to provide for Federal court proceedings in Plano, Texas	Pub. L. 108–157 (text) (PDF)
108-158	December 3, 2003	Overseas Private Investment Corporation Amendments Act of 2003	An act to amend the Foreign Assistance Act of 1961 to reauthorize the Overseas Private Investment Corporation, and for other purposes	Pub. L. 108–158 (text) (PDF)
108-159	December 4, 2003	Fair and Accurate Credit Transactions Act of 2003	An act to amend the Fair Credit Reporting Act, to prevent identity theft, improve resolution of consumer disputes, improve the accuracy of consumer records, make improvements in the use of, and consumer access to, credit information, and for other purposes	Pub. L. 108–159 (text) (PDF)
108-160	December 6, 2003	Environmental Policy and Conflict Resolution Advancement Act of 2003	An act to reauthorize the United States Institute for Environmental Conflict Resolution, and for other purposes	Pub. L. 108–160 (text) (PDF)
108-161	December 6, 2003	National Veterinary Medical Service Act	An act to authorize the Secretary of Agriculture to conduct a loan repayment program regarding the provision of veterinary services in shortage situations, and for other purposes	Pub. L. 108–161 (text) (PDF)
108-162	December 6, 2003	(No short title)	An act to award a congressional gold medal to Dr. Dorothy Height in recognition of her many contributions to the Nation	Pub. L. 108–162 (text) (PDF)
108-163	December 6, 2003	Health Care Safety Net Amendments Technical Corrections Act of 2003	An act to make certain technical and conforming amendments to correct the Health Care Safety Net Amendments of 2002	Pub. L. 108–163 (text) (PDF)
108-164	December 6, 2003	Fairness to Contact Lens Consumers Act	An act to provide for availability of contact lens prescriptions to patients, and for other purposes	Pub. L. 108–164 (text) (PDF)
108-165	December 6, 2003	(No short title)	An act to designate the facility of the United States Postal Service located at 57 Old Tappan Road in Tappan, New York, as the "John G. Dow Post Office Building"	Pub. L. 108–165 (text) (PDF)
108-166	December 6, 2003	(No short title)	An act to designate the facility of the United States Postal Service located at 38 Spring Street in Nashua, New Hampshire, as the "Hugh Gregg Post Office Building"	Pub. L. 108–166 (text) (PDF)
108-167	December 6, 2003	(No short title)	An act to authorize salary adjustments for Justices and judges of the United States for fiscal year 2004	Pub. L. 108–167 (text) (PDF)
108-168	December 6, 2003	National Transportation Safety Board Reauthorization Act of 2003	An act to reauthorize the National Transportation Safety Board, and for other purposes	Pub. L. 108–168 (text) (PDF)
108-169	December 6, 2003	(No short title)	An act to reauthorize the United States Fire Administration, and for other purposes	Pub. L. 108–169 (text) (PDF)
108-170	December 6, 2003	(No short title)	An act to amend title 38, United States Code, to improve and enhance provision of health care for veterans, to authorize major construction projects and other facilities matters for the Department of Veterans Affairs, to enhance and improve authorities relating to the administration of personnel of the Department of Veterans Affairs, and for other purposes	Pub. L. 108–170 (text) (PDF)
108-171	December 6, 2003	National Flood Insurance Program Reauthorization Act of 2004	An act to extend the national flood insurance program	Pub. L. 108–171 (text) (PDF)
108-172	December 6, 2003	(No short title)	An act to temporarily extend the programs under the Small Business Act and the Small Business Investment Act of 1958 through March 15, 2004, and for other purposes	Pub. L. 108–172 (text) (PDF)
108-173	December 8, 2003	Medicare Prescription Drug, Improvement, and Modernization Act of 2003	An act to amend title XVIII of the Social Security Act to provide for a voluntary program for prescription drug coverage under the Medicare Program, to modernize the Medicare Program, to amend the Internal Revenue Code of 1986 to allow a deduction to individuals for amounts contributed to health savings security accounts and health savings accounts, to provide for the disposition of unused health benefits in cafeteria plans and flexible spending arrangements, and for other purposes	Pub. L. 108–173 (text) (PDF)
108-174	December 9, 2003	(No short title)	An act to reauthorize the ban on undetectable firearms	Pub. L. 108–174 (text) (PDF)
108-175	December 12, 2003	Syria Accountability and Lebanese Sovereignty Restoration Act of 2003	An act to halt Syrian support for terrorism, end its occupation of Lebanon, and stop its development of weapons of mass destruction, and by so doing hold Syria accountable for the serious international security problems it has caused in the Middle East, and for other purposes	Pub. L. 108–175 (text) (PDF)
108-176	December 12, 2003	(No short title)	An act to amend title 49, United States Code, to reauthorize programs for the Federal Aviation Administration, and for other purposes	Pub. L. 108–176 (text) (PDF)
108-177	December 13, 2003	Intelligence Authorization Act for Fiscal Year 2004	An act to authorize appropriations for fiscal year 2004 for intelligence and intelligence-related activities of the United States Government, the Community Management Account, and the Central Intelligence Agency Retirement and Disability System, and for other purposes	Pub. L. 108–177 (text) (PDF)
108-178	December 15, 2003	(No short title)	An act to improve the United States Code	Pub. L. 108–178 (text) (PDF)
108-179	December 15, 2003	Torture Victims Relief Reauthorization Act of 2003	An act to amend the Torture Victims Relief Act of 1998 to authorize appropriations to provide assistance for domestic and foreign centers and programs for the treatment of victims of torture, and for other purposes	Pub. L. 108–179 (text) (PDF)
108-180	December 15, 2003	(No short title)	An act to award congressional gold medals posthumously on behalf of Reverend Joseph A. DeLaine, Harry and Eliza Briggs, and Levi Pearson in recognition of their contributions to the Nation as pioneers in the effort to desegregate public schools that led directly to the landmark desegregation case of Brown et al. v. the Board of Education of Topeka et al.	Pub. L. 108–180 (text) (PDF)
108-181	December 15, 2003	(No short title)	Joint resolution appointing the day for the convening of the second session of the One Hundred Eighth Congress	Pub. L. 108–181 (text) (PDF)
108-182	December 15, 2003	Hometown Heroes Survivors Benefits Act of 2003	An act to ensure that a public safety officer who suffers a fatal heart attack or stroke while on duty shall be presumed to have died in the line of duty for purposes of public safety officer survivor benefits	Pub. L. 108–182 (text) (PDF)
108-183	December 16, 2003	Veterans Benefits Act of 2003	An act to amend title 38, United States Code, to improve benefits under laws administered by the Secretary of Veterans Affairs, and for other purposes	Pub. L. 108–183 (text) (PDF)
108-184	December 16, 2003	National Museum of African American History and Culture Act	An act to establish within the Smithsonian Institution the National Museum of African American History and Culture, and for other purposes	Pub. L. 108–184 (text) (PDF)
108-185	December 16, 2003	(No short title)	Joint resolution making further continuing appropriations for the fiscal year 2004, and for other purposes	Pub. L. 108–185 (text) (PDF)
108-186	December 16, 2003	(No short title)	An act to support certain housing proposals in the fiscal year 2003 budget for the Federal Government, including the downpayment assistance initiative under the HOME Investment Partnership Act, and for other purposes	Pub. L. 108–186 (text) (PDF)
108-187	December 16, 2003	Controlling the Assault of Non- Solicited Pornography and Marketing Act of 2003	An act to regulate interstate commerce by imposing limitations and penalties on the transmission of unsolicited commercial electronic mail via the Internet	Pub. L. 108–187 (text) (PDF)
108-188	December 17, 2003	(No short title)	Joint resolution to approve the Compact of Free Association, as amended, between the Government of the United States of America and the Government of the Federated States of Micronesia, and the Compact of Free Association, as amended, between the Government of the United States of America and the Government of the Republic of the Marshall Islands, and to appropriate funds to carry out the amended Compacts	Pub. L. 108–188 (text) (PDF)
108-189	December 19, 2003	(No short title)	An act to restate, clarify, and revise the Soldiers' and Sailors' Civil Relief Act of 1940	Pub. L. 108–189 (text) (PDF)
108-190	December 19, 2003	(No short title)	An act to provide for the exchange of certain lands in the Coconino and Tonto National Forests in Arizona, and for other purposes	Pub. L. 108–190 (text) (PDF)
108-191	December 19, 2003	Captive Wildlife Safety Act	An act to amend the Lacey Act Amendments of 1981 to further the conservation of certain wildlife species	Pub. L. 108–191 (text) (PDF)
108-192	December 19, 2003	Carter G. Woodson Home National Historic Site Act	An act to establish the Carter G. Woodson Home National Historic Site in the District of Columbia, and for other purposes	Pub. L. 108–192 (text) (PDF)
108-193	December 19, 2003	Trafficking Victims Protection Reauthorization Act of 2003	An act to authorize appropriations for fiscal years 2004 and 2005 for the Trafficking Victims Protection Act of 2000, and for other purposes	Pub. L. 108–193 (text) (PDF)
108-194	December 19, 2003	Poison Control Center Enhancement and Awareness Act Amendments of 2003	An act to provide assistance for poison prevention and to stabilize the funding of regional poison control centers	Pub. L. 108–194 (text) (PDF)
108-195	December 19, 2003	Defense Production Act Reauthorization of 2003	An act to reauthorize the Defense Production Act of 1950, and for other purposes	Pub. L. 108–195 (text) (PDF)
108-196	December 19, 2003	Federal Law Enforcement Pay and Benefits Parity Act of 2003	An act to provide for a report on the parity of pay and benefits among Federal law enforcement officers and to establish an exchange program between Federal law enforcement employees and State and local law enforcement employees	Pub. L. 108–196 (text) (PDF)
108-197	December 19, 2003	Mental Health Parity Reauthorization Act of 2003	An act to amend the Employee Retirement Income Security Act of 1974 and the Public Health Service Act to extend the mental health benefits parity provisions for an additional year	Pub. L. 108–197 (text) (PDF)
108-198	December 19, 2003	Preserving Independence of Financial Institution Examinations Act of 2003	An act to prohibit the offer of credit by a financial institution to a financial institution examiner, and for other purposes	Pub. L. 108–198 (text) (PDF)
108-199	January 23, 2004	Consolidated Appropriations Act, 2004	An act making appropriations for Agriculture, Rural Development, Food and Drug Administration, and Related Agencies for the fiscal year ending September 30, 2004, and for other purposes	Pub. L. 108–199 (text) (PDF)
108-200	February 13, 2004	Congo Basin Forest Partnership Act of 2004	An act to authorize appropriations for fiscal year 2004 to carry out the Congo Basin Forest Partnership program, and for other purposes	Pub. L. 108–200 (text) (PDF)
108-201	February 24, 2004	NASA Flexibility Act of 2004	An act to amend the provisions of title 5, United States Code, to provide for workforce flexibilities and certain Federal personnel provisions relating to the National Aeronautics and Space Administration, and for other purposes	Pub. L. 108–201 (text) (PDF)
108-202	February 29, 2004	Surface Transportation Extension Act of 2004	An act to provide an extension of highway, highway safety, motor carrier safety, transit, and other programs funded out of the Highway Trust Fund pending enactment of a law reauthorizing the Transportation Equity Act for the 21st Century	Pub. L. 108–202 (text) (PDF)
108-203	March 2, 2004	(No short title)	An act to amend the Social Security Act and the Internal Revenue Code of 1986 to provide additional safeguards for Social Security and Supplemental Security Income beneficiaries with representative payees, to enhance program protections, and for other purposes	Pub. L. 108–203 (text) (PDF)
108-204	March 2, 2004	(No short title)	An act to make technical corrections to laws relating to Native Americans, and for other purposes	Pub. L. 108–204 (text) (PDF)
108-205	March 15, 2004	(No short title)	An act to provide for an additional temporary extension of programs under the Small Business Act and the Small Business Investment Act of 1958 through April 2, 2004, and for other purposes	Pub. L. 108–205 (text) (PDF)
108-206	March 15, 2004	(No short title)	An act to provide for the conveyance of a small parcel of Bureau of Land Management land in Douglas County, Oregon, to the county to improve management of and recreational access to the Oregon Dunes National Recreation Area, and for other purposes	Pub. L. 108–206 (text) (PDF)
108-207	March 16, 2004	(No short title)	An act to extend the final report date and termination date of the National Commission on Terrorist Attacks Upon the United States, to provide additional funding for the commission, and for other purposes	Pub. L. 108–207 (text) (PDF)
108-208	March 19, 2004	Galisteo Basin Archaeological Sites Protection Act	An act to provide for the protection of archaeological sites in the Galisteo Basin in New Mexico, and for other purposes	Pub. L. 108–208 (text) (PDF)
108-209	March 19, 2004	Fort Bayard National Historic Landmark Act	An act to designate Fort Bayard Historic District in the State of New Mexico as a National Historic Landmark, and for other purposes	Pub. L. 108–209 (text) (PDF)
108-210	March 31, 2004	Welfare Reform Extension Act of 2004	An act to reauthorize the Temporary Assistance for Needy Families block grant program through June 30, 2004, and for other purposes	Pub. L. 108–210 (text) (PDF)
108-211	March 31, 2004	(No short title)	An act to reauthorize certain school lunch and child nutrition programs through June 30, 2004	Pub. L. 108–211 (text) (PDF)
108-212	April 1, 2004	Unborn Victims of Violence Act of 2004	An act to amend title 18, United States Code, and the Uniform Code of Military Justice to protect unborn children from assault and murder, and for other purposes	Pub. L. 108–212 (text) (PDF)
108-213	April 1, 2004	Energy Efficient Housing Technical Correction Act	An act to amend section 220 of the National Housing Act to make a technical correction to restore allowable increases in the maximum mortgage limits for FHA-insured mortgages for multifamily housing projects to cover increased costs of installing a solar energy system or residential energy conservation measures	Pub. L. 108–213 (text) (PDF)
108-214	April 1, 2004	Medical Devices Technical Corrections Act	An act to amend the Federal Food, Drug, and Cosmetic Act to make technical corrections relating to the amendments made by the Medical Device User Fee and Modernization Act of 2002, and for other purposes	Pub. L. 108–214 (text) (PDF)
108-215	April 5, 2004	(No short title)	An act to authorize the President of the United States to agree to certain amendments to the Agreement between the Government of the United States of America and the Government of the United Mexican States concerning the establishment of a Border Environment Cooperation Commission and a North American Development Bank, and for other purposes	Pub. L. 108–215 (text) (PDF)
108-216	April 5, 2004	Organ Donation and Recovery Improvement Act	An act to amend the Public Health Service Act to promote organ donation, and for other purposes	Pub. L. 108–216 (text) (PDF)
108-217	April 5, 2004	(No short title)	An act to provide for an additional temporary extension of programs under the Small Business Act and the Small Business Investment Act of 1958 through June 4, 2004, and for other purposes	Pub. L. 108–217 (text) (PDF)
108-218	April 10, 2004	Pension Funding Equity Act of 2004	An act to amend the Employee Retirement Income Security Act of 1974 and the Internal Revenue Code of 1986 to temporarily replace the 30-year Treasury rate with a rate based on long-term corporate bonds for certain pension plan funding requirements and other provisions, and for other purposes	Pub. L. 108–218 (text) (PDF)
108-219	April 13, 2004	(No short title)	An act to provide for the conveyance to the Utrok Atoll local government of a decommissioned National Oceanic and Atmospheric Administration ship, and for other purposes	Pub. L. 108–219 (text) (PDF)
108-220	April 22, 2004	(No short title)	An act to require the Secretary of Defense to reimburse members of the United States Armed Forces for certain transportation expenses incurred by the members in connection with leave under the Central Command Rest and Recuperation Leave Program before the program was expanded to include domestic travel	Pub. L. 108–220 (text) (PDF)
108-221	April 30, 2004	(No short title)	An act to direct the Administrator of General Services to convey to Fresno County, California, the existing Federal courthouse in that county	Pub. L. 108–221 (text) (PDF)
108-222	April 30, 2004	(No short title)	An act to provide for the distribution of judgment funds to the Cowlitz Indian Tribe	Pub. L. 108–222 (text) (PDF)
108-223	April 30, 2004	(No short title)	An act to designate the Orville Wright Federal Building and the Wilbur Wright Federal Building in Washington, District of Columbia	Pub. L. 108–223 (text) (PDF)
108-224	April 30, 2004	Surface Transportation Extension Act of 2004, Part II	An act to provide an extension of highway, highway safety, motor carrier safety, transit, and other programs funded out of the Highway Trust Fund pending enactment of a law reauthorizing the Transportation Equity Act for the 21st Century	Pub. L. 108–224 (text) (PDF)
108-225	May 7, 2004	(No short title)	An act to designate the United States courthouse located at 400 North Miami Avenue in Miami, Florida, as the "Wilkie D. Ferguson, Jr. United States Courthouse"	Pub. L. 108–225 (text) (PDF)
108-226	May 7, 2004	(No short title)	An act to designate the Federal building located at 250 West Cherry Street in Carbondale, Illinois the "Senator Paul Simon Federal Building"	Pub. L. 108–226 (text) (PDF)
108-227	May 7, 2004	(No short title)	An act to designate a Federal building in Harrisburg, Pennsylvania, as the "Ronald Reagan Federal Building"	Pub. L. 108–227 (text) (PDF)
108-228	May 18, 2004	(No short title)	An act to amend the Communications Satellite Act of 1962 to extend the deadline for the Intelsat initial public offering	Pub. L. 108–228 (text) (PDF)
108-229	May 28, 2004	(No short title)	An act to provide for expansion of Sleeping Bear Dunes National Lakeshore	Pub. L. 108–229 (text) (PDF)
108-230	May 28, 2004	(No short title)	An act to require the conveyance of certain National Forest System lands in Mendocino National Forest, California, to provide for the use of the proceeds from such conveyance for National Forest purposes, and for other purposes	Pub. L. 108–230 (text) (PDF)
108-231	May 28, 2004	(No short title)	An act to authorize the Secretary of the Interior to revise a repayment contract with the Tom Green County Water Control and Improvement District No. 1, San Angelo project, Texas, and for other purposes	Pub. L. 108–231 (text) (PDF)
108-232	May 28, 2004	Premier Certified Lenders Program Improvement Act of 2004	An act to amend the Small Business Investment Act of 1958 to allow certain premier certified lenders to elect to maintain an alternative loss reserve	Pub. L. 108–232 (text) (PDF)
108-233	May 28, 2004	Irvine Basin Surface and Groundwater Improvement Act of 2004	An act to amend the Reclamation Wastewater and Groundwater Study and Facilities Act to authorize the Secretary of the Interior to participate in projects within the San Diego Creek Watershed, California, and for other purposes	Pub. L. 108–233 (text) (PDF)
108-234	May 28, 2004	(No short title)	An act to provide for the establishment of separate campaign medals to be awarded to members of the uniformed services who participate in Operation Enduring Freedom and to members of the uniformed services who participate in Operation Iraqi Freedom	Pub. L. 108–234 (text) (PDF)
108-235	June 14, 2004	(No short title)	An act to address the participation of Taiwan in the World Health Organization	Pub. L. 108–235 (text) (PDF)
108-236	June 15, 2004	(No short title)	Joint resolution recognizing the 60th anniversary of the Allied landing at Normandy during World War II	Pub. L. 108–236 (text) (PDF)
108-237	June 22, 2004	(No short title)	An act to encourage the development and promulgation of voluntary consensus standards by providing relief under the antitrust laws to standards development organizations with respect to conduct engaged in for the purpose of developing voluntary consensus standards, and for other purposes	Pub. L. 108–237 (text) (PDF)
108-238	June 22, 2004	National Great Black Americans Commemoration Act of 2004	An act to authorize assistance for the National Great Blacks in Wax Museum and Justice Learning Center	Pub. L. 108–238 (text) (PDF)
108-239	June 25, 2004	(No short title)	An act to designate the facility of the United States Postal Service located at 3751 West 6th Street in Los Angeles, California, as the "Dosan Ahn Chang Ho Post Office"	Pub. L. 108–239 (text) (PDF)
108-240	June 25, 2004	(No short title)	An act to redesignate the facility of the United States Postal Service located at 121 Kinderkamack Road in River Edge, New Jersey, as the "New Bridge Landing Post Office"	Pub. L. 108–240 (text) (PDF)
108-241	June 25, 2004	(No short title)	An act to designate the facility of the United States Postal Service located at 115 West Pine Street in Hattiesburg, Mississippi, as the "Major Henry A. Commiskey, Sr. Post Office Building"	Pub. L. 108–241 (text) (PDF)
108-242	June 25, 2004	(No short title)	An act to designate the facility of the United States Postal Service located at 255 North Main Street in Jonesboro, Georgia, as the "S. Truett Cathy Post Office Building"	Pub. L. 108–242 (text) (PDF)
108-243	June 25, 2004	(No short title)	An act to designate the facility of the United States Postal Service located at 304 West Michigan Street in Stuttgart, Arkansas, as the "Lloyd L. Burke Post Office"	Pub. L. 108–243 (text) (PDF)
108-244	June 25, 2004	(No short title)	An act to designate the facility of the United States Postal Service located at 2055 Siesta Drive in Sarasota, Florida, as the "Brigadier General (AUS- Ret.) John H. McLain Post Office"	Pub. L. 108–244 (text) (PDF)
108-245	June 25, 2004	(No short title)	An act to designate the facility of the United States Postal Service located at 14 Chestnut Street in Liberty, New York, as the "Ben R. Gerow Post Office Building"	Pub. L. 108–245 (text) (PDF)
108-246	June 25, 2004	(No short title)	An act to designate the facility of the United States Postal Service located at 15500 Pearl Road in Strongsville, Ohio, as the "Walter F. Ehrnfelt, Jr. Post Office Building"	Pub. L. 108–246 (text) (PDF)
108-247	June 25, 2004	(No short title)	An act to designate the facility of the United States Postal Service located at 525 Main Street in Tarboro, North Carolina, as the "George Henry White Post Office Building"	Pub. L. 108–247 (text) (PDF)
108-248	June 25, 2004	(No short title)	An act to designate the facility of the United States Postal Service located at 210 Main Street in Malden, Illinois, as the "Army Staff Sgt. Lincoln Hollinsaid Malden Post Office"	Pub. L. 108–248 (text) (PDF)
108-249	June 25, 2004	(No short title)	An act to designate the facility of the United States Postal Service located at 185 State Street in Manhattan, Illinois, as the "Army Pvt. Shawn Pahnke Manhattan Post Office"	Pub. L. 108–249 (text) (PDF)
108-250	June 25, 2004	(No short title)	An act to designate the facility of the United States Postal Service located at 201 South Chicago Avenue in Saint Anne, Illinois, as the "Marine Capt. Ryan Beaupre Saint Anne Post Office"	Pub. L. 108–250 (text) (PDF)
108-251	June 25, 2004	(No short title)	An act to designate the facility of the United States Postal Service located at 2 West Main Street in Batavia, New York, as the "Barber Conable Post Office Building"	Pub. L. 108–251 (text) (PDF)
108-252	June 25, 2004	(No short title)	An act to designate the facility of the United States Postal Service located at 410 Huston Street in Altamont, Kansas, as the "Myron V. George Post Office"	Pub. L. 108–252 (text) (PDF)
108-253	June 25, 2004	(No short title)	An act to designate the facility of the United States Postal Service located at 223 South Main Street in Roxboro, North Carolina, as the "Oscar Scott Woody Post Office Building"	Pub. L. 108–253 (text) (PDF)
108-254	June 25, 2004	(No short title)	An act to designate the facility of the United States Postal Service located at 137 East Young High Pike in Knoxville, Tennessee, as the "Ben Atchley Post Office Building"	Pub. L. 108–254 (text) (PDF)
108-255	June 25, 2004	(No short title)	An act to designate the facility of the United States Postal Service located at 607 Pershing Drive in Laclede, Missouri, as the "General John J. Pershing Post Office"	Pub. L. 108–255 (text) (PDF)
108-256	June 25, 2004	(No short title)	An act to designate the facility of the United States Postal Service located at 695 Marconi Boulevard in Copiague, New York, as the "Maxine S. Postal United States Post Office"	Pub. L. 108–256 (text) (PDF)
108-257	June 25, 2004	(No short title)	An act to redesignate the facility of the United States Postal Service located at 14-24 Abbott Road in Fair Lawn, New Jersey, as the "Mary Ann Collura Post Office Building"	Pub. L. 108–257 (text) (PDF)
108-258	June 25, 2004	(No short title)	An act to redesignate the facility of the United States Postal Service located at 7 Commercial Boulevard in Middletown, Rhode Island, as the "Rhode Island Veterans Post Office Building"	Pub. L. 108–258 (text) (PDF)
108-259	June 25, 2004	(No short title)	An act to designate the facility of the United States Postal Service located at 475 Kell Farm Drive in Cape Girardeau, Missouri, as the "Richard G. Wilson Processing and Distribution Facility"	Pub. L. 108–259 (text) (PDF)
108-260	June 25, 2004	(No short title)	An act to designate the facility of the United States Postal Service located at 122 West Elwood Avenue in Raeford, North Carolina, as the "Bobby Marshall Gentry Post Office Building"	Pub. L. 108–260 (text) (PDF)
108-261	June 25, 2004	(No short title)	An act to designate the facility of the United States Postal Service located at 410 South Jackson Road in Edinburg, Texas, as the "Dr. Miguel A. Nevarez Post Office Building"	Pub. L. 108–261 (text) (PDF)
108-262	June 30, 2004	TANF and Related Programs Continuation Act of 2004	An act to reauthorize the Temporary Assistance for Needy Families block grant program through September 30, 2004, and for other purposes	Pub. L. 108–262 (text) (PDF)
108-263	June 30, 2004	Surface Transportation Extension Act of 2004, Part III	An act to provide an extension of highway, highway safety, motor carrier safety, transit, and other programs funded out of the Highway Trust Fund pending enactment of a law reauthorizing the Transportation Equity Act for the 21st Century	Pub. L. 108–263 (text) (PDF)
108-264	June 30, 2004	Bunning-Bereuter- Blumenauer Flood Insurance Reform Act of 2004	An act to amend the National Flood Insurance Act of 1968 to reduce losses to properties for which repetitive flood insurance claim payments have been made	Pub. L. 108–264 (text) (PDF)
108-265	June 30, 2004	Child Nutrition and WIC Reauthorization Act of 2004	An act to amend the Richard B. Russell National School Lunch Act and the Child Nutrition Act of 1966 to provide children with increased access to food and nutrition assistance, to simplify program operations and improve program management, to reauthorize child nutrition programs, and for other purposes	Pub. L. 108–265 (text) (PDF)
108-266	July 2, 2004	Marine Turtle Conservation Act of 2004	An act to assist in the conservation of marine turtles and the nesting habitats of marine turtles in foreign countries	Pub. L. 108–266 (text) (PDF)
108-267	July 2, 2004	(No short title)	An act to amend the Indian Self-Determination and Education Assistance Act to redesignate the American Indian Education Foundation as the National Fund for Excellence in American Indian Education	Pub. L. 108–267 (text) (PDF)
108-268	July 2, 2004	(No short title)	An act to provide for the transfer of the Nebraska Avenue Naval Complex in the District of Columbia to facilitate the establishment of the headquarters for the Department of Homeland Security, to provide for the acquisition by the Department of the Navy of suitable replacement facilities, and for other purposes	Pub. L. 108–268 (text) (PDF)
108-269	July 2, 2004	(No short title)	An act to amend the Bend Pine Nursery Land Conveyance Act to direct the Secretary of Agriculture to sell the Bend Pine Nursery Administrative Site in the State of Oregon	Pub. L. 108–269 (text) (PDF)
108-270	July 7, 2004	Western Shoshone Claims Distribution Act	An act to provide for the use and distribution of the funds awarded to the Western Shoshone identifiable group under Indian Claims Commission Docket Numbers 326-A-1, 326-A-3, and 326-K, and for other purposes	Pub. L. 108–270 (text) (PDF)
108-271	July 7, 2004	GAO Human Capital Reform Act of 2004	An act to provide new human capital flexibilities with respect to the GAO, and for other purposes	Pub. L. 108–271 (text) (PDF)
108-272	July 7, 2004	(No short title)	Joint resolution approving the renewal of import restrictions contained in the Burmese Freedom and Democracy Act of 2003	Pub. L. 108–272 (text) (PDF)
108-273	July 7, 2004	(No short title)	An act to designate the United States courthouse and post office building located at 93 Atocha Street in Ponce, Puerto Rico, as the "Luis A. Ferre United States Courthouse and Post Office Building"	Pub. L. 108–273 (text) (PDF)
108-274	July 13, 2004	AGOA Acceleration Act of 2004	An act to extend and modify the trade benefits under the African Growth and Opportunity Act	Pub. L. 108–274 (text) (PDF)
108-275	July 15, 2004	Identity Theft Penalty Enhancement Act	An act to amend title 18, United States Code, to establish penalties for aggravated identity theft, and for other purposes	Pub. L. 108–275 (text) (PDF)
108-276	July 21, 2004	Project BioShield Act of 2004	An act to amend the Public Health Service Act to provide protections and countermeasures against chemical, radiological, or nuclear agents that may be used in a terrorist attack against the United States by giving the National Institutes of Health contracting flexibility, infrastructure improvements, and expediting the scientific peer review process, and streamlining the Food and Drug Administration approval process of countermeasures	Pub. L. 108–276 (text) (PDF)
108-277	July 22, 2004	Law Enforcement Officers Safety Act of 2004	An act to amend title 18, United States Code, to exempt qualified current and former law enforcement officers from State laws prohibiting the carrying of concealed handguns	Pub. L. 108–277 (text) (PDF)
108-278	July 22, 2004	Tribal Forest Protection Act of 2004	An act to authorize the Secretary of Agriculture and the Secretary of the Interior to enter into an agreement or contract with Indian tribes meeting certain criteria to carry out projects to protect Indian forest land	Pub. L. 108–278 (text) (PDF)
108-279	July 22, 2004	(No short title)	An act to resolve boundary conflicts in Barry and Stone Counties in the State of Missouri	Pub. L. 108–279 (text) (PDF)
108-280	July 30, 2004	Surface Transportation Extension Act of 2004, Part IV	An act to provide an extension of highway, highway safety, motor carrier safety, transit, and other programs funded out of the Highway Trust Fund pending enactment of a law reauthorizing the Transportation Equity Act for the 21st Century	Pub. L. 108–280 (text) (PDF)
108-281	August 2, 2004	(No short title)	An act to amend the E-Government Act of 2002 with respect to rulemaking authority of the Judicial Conference	Pub. L. 108–281 (text) (PDF)
108-282	August 2, 2004	(No short title)	An act to amend the Federal Food, Drug, and Cosmetic Act with regard to new animal drugs, and for other purposes	Pub. L. 108–282 (text) (PDF)
108-283	August 2, 2004	Northern Uganda Crisis Response Act	An act to require a report on the conflict in Uganda, and for other purposes	Pub. L. 108–283 (text) (PDF)
108-284	August 2, 2004	(No short title)	Joint resolution providing for the appointment of Eli Broad as a citizen regent of the Board of Regents of the Smithsonian Institution	Pub. L. 108–284 (text) (PDF)
108-285	August 2, 2004	Helping Hands for Homeownership Act of 2004	An act to facilitate self-help housing homeownership opportunities	Pub. L. 108–285 (text) (PDF)
108-286	August 3, 2004	Australia–United States Free Trade Agreement Act	An act to implement the Australia-United States Free Trade Agreement	Pub. L. 108–286 (text) (PDF)
108-287	August 5, 2004	Department of Defense Appropriations Act, 2005	An act making appropriations for the Department of Defense for the fiscal year ending September 30, 2005, and for other purposes	Pub. L. 108–287 (text) (PDF)
108-288	August 6, 2004	(No short title)	An act to designate the United States courthouse located at 100 North Palafox Street in Pensacola, Florida, as the "Winston E. Arnow United States Courthouse"	Pub. L. 108–288 (text) (PDF)
108-289	August 6, 2004	Jamestown 400th Anniversary Commemorative Coin Act of 2004	An act to provide for the issuance of a coin to commemorate the 400th anniversary of the Jamestown settlement	Pub. L. 108–289 (text) (PDF)
108-290	August 6, 2004	John Marshall Commemorative Coin Act	An act to require the Secretary of the Treasury to mint coins in commemoration of Chief Justice John Marshall	Pub. L. 108–290 (text) (PDF)
108-291	August 6, 2004	Marine Corps 230th Anniversary Commemorative Coin Act	An act to require the Secretary of the Treasury to mint coins in commemoration of the 230th Anniversary of the United States Marine Corps, and to support construction of the Marine Corps Heritage Center	Pub. L. 108–291 (text) (PDF)
108-292	August 6, 2004	(No short title)	An act to designate the facility of the United States Postal Service located at 4737 Mile Stretch Drive in Holiday, Florida, as the "Sergeant First Class Paul Ray Smith Post Office Building"	Pub. L. 108–292 (text) (PDF)
108-293	August 9, 2004	(No short title)	An act an Act to authorize appropriations for the Coast Guard for fiscal year 2005, to amend various laws administered by the Coast Guard, and for other purposes	Pub. L. 108–293 (text) (PDF)
108-294	August 9, 2004	(No short title)	An act to redesignate the facilities of the United States Postal Service located at 7715 and 7748 S. Cottage Grove Avenue in Chicago, Illinois, as the "James E. Worsham Post Office" and the "James E. Worsham Carrier Annex Building", respectively, and for other purposes	Pub. L. 108–294 (text) (PDF)
108-295	August 9, 2004	SUTA Dumping Prevention Act of 2004	An act to amend titles III and IV of the Social Security Act to improve the administration of unemployment taxes and benefits	Pub. L. 108–295 (text) (PDF)
108-296	August 9, 2004	(No short title)	An act to designate the facility of the United States Postal Service located at 550 Nebraska Avenue in Kansas City, Kansas, as the "Newell George Post Office Building"	Pub. L. 108–296 (text) (PDF)
108-297	August 9, 2004	Cape Town Treaty Implementation Act of 2004	An act to amend title 49, United States Code, to make certain conforming changes to provisions governing the registration of aircraft and the recordation of instruments in order to implement the Convention on International Interests in Mobile Equipment and the Protocol to the Convention on International Interests in Mobile Equipment on Matters Specific to Aircraft Equipment, known as the "Cape Town Treaty"	Pub. L. 108–297 (text) (PDF)
108-298	August 9, 2004	(No short title)	An act to designate the facility of the United States Postal Service located at 7450 Natural Bridge Road in St. Louis, Missouri, as the "Vitilas `Veto' Reid Post Office Building"	Pub. L. 108–298 (text) (PDF)
108-299	August 9, 2004	(No short title)	An act to modify certain deadlines pertaining to machine-readable, tamper- resistant entry and exit documents	Pub. L. 108–299 (text) (PDF)
108-300	August 9, 2004	(No short title)	An act to designate the facility of the United States Postal Service located at 73 South Euclid Avenue in Montauk, New York, as the "Perry B. Duryea, Jr. Post Office"	Pub. L. 108–300 (text) (PDF)
108-301	August 9, 2004	(No short title)	An act to preserve the ability of the Federal Housing Administration to insure mortgages under sections 238 and 519 of the National Housing Act	Pub. L. 108–301 (text) (PDF)
108-302	August 17, 2004	United States- Morocco Free Trade Agreement Implementation Act	An act to implement the United States-Morocco Free Trade Agreement	Pub. L. 108–302 (text) (PDF)
108-303	September 8, 2004	Emergency Supplemental Appropriations for Disaster Relief Act, 2004	An act making emergency supplemental appropriations for the fiscal year ending September 30, 2004, for additional disaster assistance	Pub. L. 108–303 (text) (PDF)
108-304	September 24, 2004	Sports Agent Responsibility and Trust Act	An act to designate certain conduct by sports agents relating to the signing of contracts with student athletes as unfair and deceptive acts or practices to be regulated by the Federal Trade Commission	Pub. L. 108–304 (text) (PDF)
108-305	September 24, 2004	(No short title)	An act to provide for the conveyance of the real property located at 1081 West Main Street in Ravenna, Ohio	Pub. L. 108–305 (text) (PDF)
108-306	September 24, 2004	(No short title)	An act to provide an additional temporary extension of programs under the Small Business Act and the Small Business Investment Act of 1958 through September 30, 2004, and for other purposes	Pub. L. 108–306 (text) (PDF)
108-307	September 24, 2004	Harpers Ferry National Historical Park Boundary Revision Act of 2004	An act to revise the boundary of Harpers Ferry National Historical Park, and for other purposes	Pub. L. 108–307 (text) (PDF)
108-308	September 30, 2004	Welfare Reform Extension Act, Part VIII	An act to reauthorize the Temporary Assistance for Needy Families block grant program through March 31, 2005, and for other purposes	Pub. L. 108–308 (text) (PDF)
108-309	September 30, 2004	(No short title)	Joint resolution making continuing appropriations for the fiscal year 2005, and for other purposes	Pub. L. 108–309 (text) (PDF)
108-310	September 30, 2004	Surface Transportation Extension Act of 2004, Part V	An act to provide an extension of highway, highway safety, motor carrier safety, transit, and other programs funded out of the Highway Trust Fund pending enactment of a law reauthorizing the Transportation Equity Act for the 21st Century	Pub. L. 108–310 (text) (PDF)
108-311	October 4, 2004	Working Families Tax Relief Act of 2004	An act to amend the Internal Revenue Code of 1986 to provide tax relief for working families, and for other purposes	Pub. L. 108–311 (text) (PDF)
108-312	October 5, 2004	Mount Rainier National Park Boundary Adjustment Act of 2004	An act to provide for an adjustment of the boundaries of Mount Rainier National Park, and for other purposes	Pub. L. 108–312 (text) (PDF)
108-313	October 5, 2004	Johnstown Flood National Memorial Boundary Adjustment Act of 2004	An act to provide for additional lands to be included within the boundary of the Johnstown Flood National Memorial in the State of Pennsylvania, and for other purposes	Pub. L. 108–313 (text) (PDF)
108-314	October 5, 2004	Martin Luther King, Junior, National Historic Site Land Exchange Act	An act to authorize the exchange of certain lands within the Martin Luther King, Junior, National Historic Site for lands owned by the City of Atlanta, Georgia, and for other purposes	Pub. L. 108–314 (text) (PDF)
108-315	October 5, 2004	Carpinteria and Montecito Water Distribution Systems Conveyance Act of 2004	An act to authorize the Secretary of the Interior to convey certain water distribution systems of the Cachuma Project, California, to the Carpinteria Valley Water District and the Montecito Water District	Pub. L. 108–315 (text) (PDF)
108-316	October 5, 2004	(No short title)	An act to amend the Reclamation Wastewater and Groundwater Study and Facilities Act to authorize the Secretary of the Interior to participate in the Williamson County, Texas, Water Recycling and Reuse Project, and for other purposes	Pub. L. 108–316 (text) (PDF)
108-317	October 5, 2004	Southwest Forest Health and Wildfire Prevention Act of 2004	An act to establish Institutes to demonstrate and promote the use of adaptive ecosystem management to reduce the risk of wildfires, and restore the health of fire-adapted forest and woodland ecosystems of the interior West	Pub. L. 108–317 (text) (PDF)
108-318	October 5, 2004	(No short title)	An act to amend the Reclamation Project Authorization Act of 1972 to clarify the acreage for which the North Loup division is authorized to provide irrigation water under the Missouri River Basin project	Pub. L. 108–318 (text) (PDF)
108-319	October 5, 2004	(No short title)	An act to extend the term of the Forest Counties Payments Committee	Pub. L. 108–319 (text) (PDF)
108-320	October 5, 2004	(No short title)	An act to amend the Stevenson-Wydler Technology Innovation Act of 1980 to permit Malcolm Baldrige National Quality Awards to be made to nonprofit organizations	Pub. L. 108–320 (text) (PDF)
108-321	October 5, 2004	Timucuan Ecological and Historic Preserve Boundary Revision Act of 2004	An act to expand the Timucuan Ecological and Historic Preserve, Florida	Pub. L. 108–321 (text) (PDF)
108-322	October 5, 2004	(No short title)	Joint resolution commemorating the opening of the National Museum of the American Indian	Pub. L. 108–322 (text) (PDF)
108-323	October 6, 2004	(No short title)	An act to reauthorize the Tropical Forest Conservation Act of 1998 through fiscal year 2007, and for other purposes	Pub. L. 108–323 (text) (PDF)
108-324	October 13, 2004	Military Construction Appropriations and Emergency Hurricane Supplemental Appropriations Act, 2005	An act making appropriations for military construction, family housing, and base realignment and closure for the Department of Defense for the fiscal year ending September 30, 2005, and for other purposes	Pub. L. 108–324 (text) (PDF)
108-325	October 13, 2004	Craig Recreation Land Purchase Act	An act to authorize a land conveyance between the United States and the City of Craig, Alaska, and for other purposes	Pub. L. 108–325 (text) (PDF)
108-326	October 16, 2004	(No short title)	An act to clarify the tax treatment of bonds and other obligations issued by the Government of American Samoa	Pub. L. 108–326 (text) (PDF)
108-327	October 16, 2004	National Wildlife Refuge Volunteer Act of 2004	An act to amend the Fish and Wildlife Act of 1956 to reauthorize volunteer programs and community partnerships for national wildlife refuges, and for other purposes	Pub. L. 108–327 (text) (PDF)
108-328	October 16, 2004	(No short title)	An act to amend the Safe Drinking Water Act to reauthorize the New York City Watershed Protection Program	Pub. L. 108–328 (text) (PDF)
108-329	October 16, 2004	(No short title)	An act to amend the Act of November 2, 1966 (80 Stat. 1112), to allow binding arbitration clauses to be included in all contracts affecting the land within the Salt River Pima-Maricopa Indian Reservation	Pub. L. 108–329 (text) (PDF)
108-330	October 16, 2004	Department of Homeland Security Financial Accountability Act	An act to amend title 31, United States Code, to improve the financial accountability requirements applicable to the Department of Homeland Security, to establish requirements for the Future Years Homeland Security Program of the department, and for other purposes	Pub. L. 108–330 (text) (PDF)
108-331	October 16, 2004	(No short title)	An act to authorize the Board of Regents of the Smithsonian Institution to carry out construction and related activities in support of the collaborative Very Energetic Radiation Imaging Telescope Array System (VERITAS) project on Kitt Peak near Tucson, Arizona	Pub. L. 108–331 (text) (PDF)
108-332	October 16, 2004	Global Anti-Semitism Review Act of 2004	An act to require a report on acts of anti-Semitism around the world	Pub. L. 108–332 (text) (PDF)
108-333	October 18, 2004	North Korean Human Rights Act of 2004	An act to promote human rights and freedom in the Democratic People's Republic of Korea, and for other purposes	Pub. L. 108–333 (text) (PDF)
108-334	October 18, 2004	Department of Homeland Security Appropriations Act, 2005	An act making appropriations for the Department of Homeland Security for the fiscal year ending September 30, 2005, and for other purposes	Pub. L. 108–334 (text) (PDF)
108-335	October 18, 2004	District of Columbia Appropriations Act, 2005	An act making appropriations for the government of the District of Columbia and other activities chargeable in whole or in part against revenues of said District for the fiscal year ending September 30, 2005, and for other purposes	Pub. L. 108–335 (text) (PDF)
108-336	October 18, 2004	Southern Ute and Colorado Intergovernmental Agreement Implementation Act of 2004	An act to provide for the implementation of air quality programs developed in accordance with an Intergovernmental Agreement between the Southern Ute Indian Tribe and the State of Colorado concerning Air Quality Control on the Southern Ute Indian Reservation, and for other purposes	Pub. L. 108–336 (text) (PDF)
108-337	October 18, 2004	Alaska Native Allotment Subdivision Act	An act to authorize the subdivision and dedication of restricted land owned by Alaska Natives	Pub. L. 108–337 (text) (PDF)
108-338	October 18, 2004	(No short title)	An act to direct the Secretary of Agriculture to convey to the New Hope Cemetery Association certain land in the State of Arkansas for use as a cemetery	Pub. L. 108–338 (text) (PDF)
108-339	October 18, 2004	(No short title)	An act to replace certain Coastal Barrier Resources System maps	Pub. L. 108–339 (text) (PDF)
108-340	October 18, 2004	Manhattan Project National Historical Park Study Act	An act to direct the Secretary of the Interior to conduct a study on the preservation and interpretation of the historic sites of the Manhattan Project for potential inclusion in the National Park System	Pub. L. 108–340 (text) (PDF)
108-341	October 18, 2004	(No short title)	An act to transfer Federal lands between the Secretary of Agriculture and the Secretary of the Interior	Pub. L. 108–341 (text) (PDF)
108-342	October 18, 2004	El Camino Real de los Tejas National Historic Trail Act	An act to amend the National Trails System Act to designate El Camino Real de los Tejas as a National Historic Trail	Pub. L. 108–342 (text) (PDF)
108-343	October 18, 2004	Tapoco Project Licensing Act of 2004	An act to authorize and facilitate hydroelectric power licensing of the Tapoco Project	Pub. L. 108–343 (text) (PDF)
108-344	October 18, 2004	(No short title)	An act to revise and extend the Boys and Girls Clubs of America	Pub. L. 108–344 (text) (PDF)
108-345	October 18, 2004	(No short title)	An act to redesignate the Ridges Basin Reservoir, Colorado, as Lake Nighthorse	Pub. L. 108–345 (text) (PDF)
108-346	October 18, 2004	Arapaho and Roosevelt National Forests Land Exchange Act of 2004	An act to direct the Secretary of Agriculture to exchange certain lands in the Arapaho and Roosevelt National Forests in the State of Colorado	Pub. L. 108–346 (text) (PDF)
108-347	October 20, 2004	Belarus Democracy Act of 2004	An act to provide for the promotion of democracy, human rights, and rule of law in the Republic of Belarus and for the consolidation and strengthening of Belarus sovereignty and independence	Pub. L. 108–347 (text) (PDF)
108-348	October 20, 2004	(No short title)	An act to authorize the Gateway Arch in St. Louis, Missouri, to be illuminated by pink lights in honor of breast cancer awareness month	Pub. L. 108–348 (text) (PDF)
108-349	October 21, 2004	(No short title)	An act to amend the Congressional Accountability Act of 1995 to permit members of the Board of Directors of the Office of Compliance to serve for 2 terms	Pub. L. 108–349 (text) (PDF)
108-350	October 21, 2004	(No short title)	An act to authorize the Secretary of Agriculture to sell or exchange all or part of certain administrative sites and other land in the Ozark-St. Francis and Ouachita National Forests and to use funds derived from the sale or exchange to acquire, construct, or improve administrative sites	Pub. L. 108–350 (text) (PDF)
108-351	October 21, 2004	(No short title)	An act to amend the Lease Lot Conveyance Act of 2002 to provide that the amounts received by the United States under that Act shall be deposited in the reclamation fund, and for other purposes	Pub. L. 108–351 (text) (PDF)
108-352	October 21, 2004	National Park System General Authorities Act	An act to make technical corrections to laws relating to certain units of the National Park System and to National Park programs	Pub. L. 108–352 (text) (PDF)
108-353	October 21, 2004	(No short title)	An act to designate the facility of the United States Postal Service located at 4141 Postmark Drive, Anchorage, Alaska, as the "Robert J. Opinsky Post Office Building"	Pub. L. 108–353 (text) (PDF)
108-354	October 21, 2004	Chimayo Water Supply System and Espanola Filtration Facility Act of 2004	An act to direct the Secretary of the Interior to conduct a feasibility study of a Chimayo water supply system, to provide for the planning, design, and construction of a water supply, reclamation, and filtration facility for Espanola, New Mexico, and for other purposes	Pub. L. 108–354 (text) (PDF)
108-355	October 21, 2004	Garrett Lee Smith Memorial Act	An act to amend the Public Health Service Act to support the planning, implementation, and evaluation of organized activities involving statewide youth suicide early intervention and prevention strategies, to authorize grants to institutions of higher education to reduce student mental and behavioral health problems, and for other purposes	Pub. L. 108–355 (text) (PDF)
108-356	October 21, 2004	(No short title)	An act to extend certain authority of the Supreme Court Police, modify the venue of prosecutions relating to the Supreme Court building and grounds, and authorize the acceptance of gifts to the United States Supreme Court	Pub. L. 108–356 (text) (PDF)
108-357	October 22, 2004	American Jobs Creation Act of 2004	An act to amend the Internal Revenue Code of 1986 to remove impediments in such Code and make our manufacturing, service, and high-technology businesses and workers more competitive and productive both at home and abroad	Pub. L. 108–357 (text) (PDF)
108-358	October 22, 2004	Anabolic Steroid Control Act of 2004	An act to amend the Controlled Substances Act to clarify the definition of anabolic steroids and to provide for research and education activities relating to steroids and steroid precursors	Pub. L. 108–358 (text) (PDF)
108-359	October 25, 2004	(No short title)	An act to amend the securities laws to permit church pension plans to be invested in collective trusts	Pub. L. 108–359 (text) (PDF)
108-360	October 25, 2004	National Windstorm Impact Reduction Act of 2004	An act to reauthorize the National Earthquake Hazards Reduction Program, and for other purposes	Pub. L. 108–360 (text) (PDF)
108-361	October 25, 2004	Water Supply, Reliability, and Environmental Improvement Act	An act to authorize the Secretary of the Interior to implement water supply technology and infrastructure programs aimed at increasing and diversifying domestic water resources	Pub. L. 108–361 (text) (PDF)
108-362	October 25, 2004	Pancreatic Islet Cell Transplantation Act of 2004	An act to amend the Public Health Service Act to increase the supply of pancreatic islet cells for research, and to provide for better coordination of Federal efforts and information on islet cell transplantation	Pub. L. 108–362 (text) (PDF)
108-363	October 25, 2004	Veterans' Compensation Cost-of-Living Adjustment Act of 2004	An act to increase, effective as of December 1, 2004, the rates of disability compensation for veterans with service-connected disabilities and the rates of dependency and indemnity compensation for survivors of certain service-connected disabled veterans, and for other purposes	Pub. L. 108–363 (text) (PDF)
108-364	October 25, 2004	Assistive Technology Act of 1998	An act to amend the Assistive Technology Act of 1998 to support programs of grants to States to address the assistive technology needs of individuals with disabilities, and for other purposes	Pub. L. 108–364 (text) (PDF)
108-365	October 25, 2004	Mammography Quality Standards Reauthorization Act of 2004	An act to amend the Public Health Service Act to revise and extend provisions relating to mammography quality standards	Pub. L. 108–365 (text) (PDF)
108-366	October 25, 2004	Higher Education Extension Act of 2004	An act to temporarily extend the programs under the Higher Education Act of 1965	Pub. L. 108–366 (text) (PDF)
108-367	October 25, 2004	Fort Donelson National Battlefield Expansion Act of 2004	An act to expand the boundaries of the Fort Donelson National Battlefield to authorize the acquisition and interpretation of lands associated with the campaign that resulted in the capture of the fort in 1862, and for other purposes	Pub. L. 108–367 (text) (PDF)
108-368	October 25, 2004	(No short title)	An act to authorize the President to award a gold medal on behalf of the Congress to Reverend Doctor Martin Luther King Jr. (posthumously) and his widow Coretta Scott King in recognition of their contributions to the Nation on behalf of the civil rights movement	Pub. L. 108–368 (text) (PDF)
108-369	October 25, 2004	Family Farmer Bankruptcy Relief Act of 2004	An act to extend for eighteen months the period for which chapter 12 of title 11, United States Code, is reenacted	Pub. L. 108–369 (text) (PDF)
108-370	October 25, 2004	Prevention of Child Abduction Partnership Act	An act to amend the International Child Abduction Remedies Act to limit the tort liability of private entities or organizations that carry out responsibilities of the United States Central Authority under that Act	Pub. L. 108–370 (text) (PDF)
108-371	October 25, 2004	(No short title)	An act to modify and extend certain privatization requirements of the Communications Satellite Act of 1962	Pub. L. 108–371 (text) (PDF)
108-372	October 25, 2004	State Justice Institute Reauthorization Act of 2004	An act to reauthorize the State Justice Institute	Pub. L. 108–372 (text) (PDF)
108-373	October 27, 2004	(No short title)	An act to reauthorize and improve the program authorized by the Public Works and Economic Development Act of 1965	Pub. L. 108–373 (text) (PDF)
108-374	October 27, 2004	American Indian Probate Reform Act of 2004	An act to amend the Indian Land Consolidation Act to improve provisions relating to probate of trust and restricted land, and for other purposes	Pub. L. 108–374 (text) (PDF)
108-375	October 28, 2004	Ronald W. Reagan National Defense Authorization Act for Fiscal Year 2005	An act to authorize appropriations for fiscal year 2005 for military activities of the Department of Defense, for military construction, and for defense activities of the Department of Energy, to prescribe personnel strengths for such fiscal year for the Armed Forces, and for other purposes	Pub. L. 108–375 (text) (PDF)
108-376	October 30, 2004	(No short title)	An act to protect the voting rights of members of the Armed Services in elections for the Delegate representing American Samoa in the United States House of Representatives, and for other purposes	Pub. L. 108–376 (text) (PDF)
108-377	October 30, 2004	Asthmatic Schoolchildren's Treatment and Health Management Act of 2004	An act to give a preference regarding States that require schools to allow students to self-administer medication to treat that student's asthma or anaphylaxis, and for other purposes	Pub. L. 108–377 (text) (PDF)
108-378	October 30, 2004	(No short title)	An act to amend the Organic Act of Guam for the purposes of clarifying the local judicial structure of Guam	Pub. L. 108–378 (text) (PDF)
108-379	October 30, 2004	(No short title)	An act to amend the Agricultural Adjustment Act to remove the requirement that processors be members of an agency administering a marketing order applicable to pears	Pub. L. 108–379 (text) (PDF)
108-380	October 30, 2004	(No short title)	An act to clarify the boundaries of the John H. Chafee Coast Barrier Resources System Cedar Keys Unit P25 on Otherwise Protected Area P25P	Pub. L. 108–380 (text) (PDF)
108-381	October 30, 2004	(No short title)	An act to provide for the conveyance of several small parcels of National Forest System land in the Apalachicola National Forest, Florida, to resolve boundary discrepancies involving the Mt. Trial Primitive Baptist Church of Wakulla County, Florida, and for other purposes	Pub. L. 108–381 (text) (PDF)
108-382	October 30, 2004	Provo River Project Transfer Act	An act to authorize the Secretary of the Interior to convey certain lands and facilities of the Provo River Project	Pub. L. 108–382 (text) (PDF)
108-383	October 30, 2004	National Archives and Records Administration Efficiency Act of 2004	An act to amend title 44, United States Code, to improve the efficiency of operations by the National Archives and Records Administration and to reauthorize the National Historical Publications and Records Commission	Pub. L. 108–383 (text) (PDF)
108-384	October 30, 2004	Brown Tree Snake Control and Eradication Act of 2004	An act to provide for the control and eradication of the brown tree snake on the island of Guam and the prevention of the introduction of the brown tree snake to other areas of the United States, and for other purposes	Pub. L. 108–384 (text) (PDF)
108-385	October 30, 2004	John Muir National Historic Site Boundary Adjustment Act	An act to adjust the boundary of the John Muir National Historic Site, and for other purposes	Pub. L. 108–385 (text) (PDF)
108-386	October 30, 2004	2004 District of Columbia Omnibus Authorization Act	An act to authorize improvements in the operations of the government of the District of Columbia, and for other purposes	Pub. L. 108–386 (text) (PDF)
108-387	October 30, 2004	(No short title)	An act to redesignate Fort Clatsop National Memorial as the Lewis and Clark National Historical Park, to include in the park sites in the State of Washington as well as the State of Oregon, and for other purposes	Pub. L. 108–387 (text) (PDF)
108-388	October 30, 2004	(No short title)	An act to designate the facility of the United States Postal Service located at 555 West 180th Street in New York, New York, as the "Sergeant Riayan A. Tejeda Post Office"	Pub. L. 108–388 (text) (PDF)
108-389	October 30, 2004	Chickasaw National Recreation Area Land Exchange Act of 2004	An act to provide for the conveyance of certain land to the United States and to revise the boundary of Chickasaw National Recreation Area, Oklahoma, and for other purposes	Pub. L. 108–389 (text) (PDF)
108-390	October 30, 2004	(No short title)	An act to amend section 274A of the Immigration and Nationality Act to improve the process for verifying an individual's eligibility for employment	Pub. L. 108–390 (text) (PDF)
108-391	October 30, 2004	(No short title)	Joint resolution expressing the sense of the Congress in recognition of the contributions of the seven Columbia astronauts by supporting establishment of a Columbia Memorial Space Science Learning Center	Pub. L. 108–391 (text) (PDF)
108-392	October 30, 2004	(No short title)	An act to designate the facility of the United States Postal Service located at 2811 Springdale Avenue in Springdale, Arkansas, as the "Harvey and Bernice Jones Post Office Building"	Pub. L. 108–392 (text) (PDF)
108-393	October 30, 2004	Homeownership Opportunities for Native Americans Act of 2004	An act to clarify the loan guarantee authority under title VI of the Native American Housing Assistance and Self-Determination Act of 1996	Pub. L. 108–393 (text) (PDF)
108-394	October 30, 2004	Wilson's Creek National Battlefield Boundary Adjustment Act of 2004	An act to amend Public Law 86-434 establishing Wilson's Creek National Battlefield in the State of Missouri to expand the boundaries of the park, and for other purposes	Pub. L. 108–394 (text) (PDF)
108-395	October 30, 2004	(No short title)	An act to designate the facility of the United States Postal Service located at 1115 South Clinton Avenue in Dunn, North Carolina, as the "General William Carey Lee Post Office Building"	Pub. L. 108–395 (text) (PDF)
108-396	October 30, 2004	Truman Farm Home Expansion Act	An act to modify the boundary of the Harry S Truman National Historic Site in the State of Missouri, and for other purposes	Pub. L. 108–396 (text) (PDF)
108-397	October 30, 2004	(No short title)	An act to designate the facility of the United States Postal Service located at 10 West Prospect Street in Nanuet, New York, as the "Anthony I. Lombardi Memorial Post Office Building"	Pub. L. 108–397 (text) (PDF)
108-398	October 30, 2004	(No short title)	An act to designate the facility of the United States Postal Service located at 19504 Linden Boulevard in St. Albans, New York, as the "Archie Spigner Post Office Building"	Pub. L. 108–398 (text) (PDF)
108-399	October 30, 2004	(No short title)	An act to amend the Federal Water Pollution Control Act to reauthorize the National Estuary Program	Pub. L. 108–399 (text) (PDF)
108-400	October 30, 2004	(No short title)	An act to amend the Colorado Canyons National Conservation Area and Black Ridge Canyons Wilderness Act of 2000 to rename the Colorado Canyons National Conservation Area as the McInnis Canyons National Conservation Area	Pub. L. 108–400 (text) (PDF)
108-401	October 30, 2004	Federal Regulatory Improvement Act of 2004	An act to amend title 5, United States Code, to authorize appropriations for the Administrative Conference of the United States for fiscal years 2005, 2006, and 2007, and for other purposes	Pub. L. 108–401 (text) (PDF)
108-402	October 30, 2004	(No short title)	An act to designate the facility of the United States Postal Service located at 411 Midway Avenue in Mascotte, Florida, as the "Specialist Eric Ramirez Post Office"	Pub. L. 108–402 (text) (PDF)
108-403	October 30, 2004	(No short title)	An act to designate the facility of the United States Postal Service located at United States Route 1 in Ridgeway, North Carolina, as the "Eva Holtzman Post Office"	Pub. L. 108–403 (text) (PDF)
108-404	October 30, 2004	(No short title)	An act to designate the facility of the United States Postal Service located at 1001 Williams Street in Ignacio, Colorado, as the "Leonard C. Burch Post Office Building"	Pub. L. 108–404 (text) (PDF)
108-405	October 30, 2004	Scott Campbell, Stephanie Roper, Wendy Preston, Louarna Gillis, and Nila Lynn Crime Victims' Rights Act	An act to protect crime victims' rights, to eliminate the substantial backlog of DNA samples collected from crime scenes and convicted offenders, to improve and expand the DNA testing capacity of Federal, State, and local crime laboratories, to increase research and development of new DNA testing technologies, to develop new training programs regarding the collection and use of DNA evidence, to provide post-conviction testing of DNA evidence to exonerate the innocent, to improve the performance of counsel in State capital cases, and for other purposes	Pub. L. 108–405 (text) (PDF)
108-406	October 30, 2004	Special Olympics Sport and Empowerment Act of 2004	An act to provide assistance to Special Olympics to support expansion of Special Olympics and development of education programs and a Healthy Athletes Program, and for other purposes	Pub. L. 108–406 (text) (PDF)
108-407	October 30, 2004	(No short title)	An act to designate the facility of the United States Postal Service located at 11110 Sunset Hills Road in Reston, Virginia, as the "Martha Pennino Post Office Building"	Pub. L. 108–407 (text) (PDF)
108-408	October 30, 2004	(No short title)	An act to designate the facility of the United States Postal Service located at 23055 Sherman Way in West Hills, California, as the "Evan Asa Ashcraft Post Office Building"	Pub. L. 108–408 (text) (PDF)
108-409	October 30, 2004	Taxpayer-Teacher Protection Act of 2004	An act to reduce certain special allowance payments and provide additional teacher loan forgiveness on Federal student loans	Pub. L. 108–409 (text) (PDF)
108-410	October 30, 2004	John F. Kennedy Center Reauthorization Act of 2004	An act to amend the John F. Kennedy Center Act to authorize appropriations for the John F. Kennedy Center for the Performing Arts, and for other purposes	Pub. L. 108–410 (text) (PDF)
108-411	October 30, 2004	(No short title)	An act to provide for reform relating to Federal employment, and for other purposes	Pub. L. 108–411 (text) (PDF)
108-412	October 30, 2004	(No short title)	An act to require the Secretary of Agriculture to establish a program to provide assistance to eligible weed management entities to control or eradicate noxious weeds on public and private land	Pub. L. 108–412 (text) (PDF)
108-413	October 30, 2004	Hibben Center Act	An act to authorize the Secretary of the Interior, in cooperation with the University of New Mexico, to construct and occupy a portion of the Hibben Center for Archaeological Research at the University of New Mexico, and for other purposes	Pub. L. 108–413 (text) (PDF)
108-414	October 30, 2004	Mentally Ill Offender Treatment and Crime Reduction Act of 2004	An act to foster local collaborations which will ensure that resources are effectively and efficiently used within the criminal and juvenile justice systems	Pub. L. 108–414 (text) (PDF)
108-415	November 19, 2004	(No short title)	An act to amend title 31 of the United States Code to increase the public debt limit	Pub. L. 108–415 (text) (PDF)
108-416	November 21, 2004	(No short title)	Joint resolution making further continuing appropriations for the fiscal year 2005, and for other purposes	Pub. L. 108–416 (text) (PDF)
108-417	November 30, 2004	(No short title)	An act to authorize an exchange of land at Fort Frederica National Monument, and for other purposes	Pub. L. 108–417 (text) (PDF)
108-418	November 30, 2004	(No short title)	An act to amend the Reclamation Projects Authorization and Adjustment Act of 1992 to increase the Federal share of the costs of the San Gabriel Basin demonstration project	Pub. L. 108–418 (text) (PDF)
108-419	November 30, 2004	Copyright Royalty and Distribution Reform Act of 2004	An act to amend title 17, United States Code, to replace copyright arbitration royalty panels with Copyright Royalty Judges, and for other purposes	Pub. L. 108–419 (text) (PDF)
108-420	November 30, 2004	California Missions Preservation Act	An act to support the efforts of the California Missions Foundation to restore and repair the Spanish colonial and mission-era missions in the State of California and to preserve the artworks and artifacts of these missions, and for other purposes	Pub. L. 108–420 (text) (PDF)
108-421	November 30, 2004	Highlands Conservation Act	An act to assist the States of Connecticut, New Jersey, New York, and Pennsylvania in conserving priority lands and natural resources in the Highlands region, and for other purposes	Pub. L. 108–421 (text) (PDF)
108-422	November 30, 2004	Veterans Health Programs Improvement Act of 2004	An act to amend title 38, United States Code, to increase the authorization of appropriations for grants to benefit homeless veterans, to improve programs for management and administration of veterans' facilities and health care programs, and for other purposes	Pub. L. 108–422 (text) (PDF)
108-423	November 30, 2004	Department of Energy High-End Computing Revitalization Act of 2004	An act to require the Secretary of Energy to carry out a program of research and development to advance high-end computing	Pub. L. 108–423 (text) (PDF)
108-424	November 30, 2004	Lincoln County Conservation, Recreation, and Development Act of 2004	An act to establish wilderness areas, promote conservation, improve public land, and provide for the high quality development in Lincoln County, Nevada, and for other purposes	Pub. L. 108–424 (text) (PDF)
108-425	November 30, 2004	(No short title)	An act to amend the Tijuana River Valley Estuary and Beach Sewage Cleanup Act of 2000 to extend the authorization of appropriations, and for other purposes	Pub. L. 108–425 (text) (PDF)
108-426	November 30, 2004	Norman Y. Mineta Research and Special Programs Improvement Act	An act to amend title 49, United States Code, to provide the Department of Transportation a more focused research organization with an emphasis on innovative technology, and for other purposes	Pub. L. 108–426 (text) (PDF)
108-427	November 30, 2004	Research Review Act of 2004	An act to expand research information regarding multidisciplinary research projects and epidemiological studies	Pub. L. 108–427 (text) (PDF)
108-428	November 30, 2004	(No short title)	An act to extend the liability indemnification regime for the commercial space transportation industry	Pub. L. 108–428 (text) (PDF)
108-429	December 3, 2004	(No short title)	An act to amend the Harmonized Tariff Schedule of the United States to modify temporarily certain rates of duty, to make other technical amendments to the trade laws, and for other purposes	Pub. L. 108–429 (text) (PDF)
108-430	December 3, 2004	Petrified Forest National Park Expansion Act of 2004	An act to revise the boundary of the Petrified Forest National Park in the State of Arizona, and for other purposes	Pub. L. 108–430 (text) (PDF)
108-431	December 3, 2004	(No short title)	An act to reaffirm the inherent sovereign rights of the Osage Tribe to determine its membership and form of government	Pub. L. 108–431 (text) (PDF)
108-432	December 3, 2004	(No short title)	Joint resolution recognizing the 60th anniversary of the Battle of the Bulge during World War II	Pub. L. 108–432 (text) (PDF)
108-433	December 3, 2004	(No short title)	Joint resolution appointing the day for the convening of the first session of the One Hundred Ninth Congress	Pub. L. 108–433 (text) (PDF)
108-434	December 3, 2004	(No short title)	Joint resolution making further continuing appropriations for the fiscal year 2005, and for other purposes	Pub. L. 108–434 (text) (PDF)
108-435	December 3, 2004	Internet Tax Nondiscrimination Act	An act to make permanent the moratorium on taxes on Internet access and multiple and discriminatory taxes on electronic commerce imposed by the Internet Tax Freedom Act	Pub. L. 108–435 (text) (PDF)
108-436	December 3, 2004	Idaho Panhandle National Forest Improvement Act of 2004	An act to authorize the Secretary of Agriculture to sell or exchange all or part of certain parcels of National Forest System land in the State of Idaho and use the proceeds derived from the sale or exchange for National Forest System purposes	Pub. L. 108–436 (text) (PDF)
108-437	December 3, 2004	Three Affiliated Tribes Health Facility Compensation Act	An act to implement the recommendations of the Garrison Unit Joint Tribal Advisory Committee by providing authorization for the construction of a rural health care facility on the Fort Berthold Indian Reservation, North Dakota	Pub. L. 108–437 (text) (PDF)
108-438	December 3, 2004	Kate Mullany National Historic Site Act	An act to establish the Kate Mullany National Historic Site in the State of New York, and for other purposes	Pub. L. 108–438 (text) (PDF)
108-439	December 3, 2004	(No short title)	An act to authorize additional appropriations for the Reclamation Safety of Dams Act of 1978	Pub. L. 108–439 (text) (PDF)
108-440	December 3, 2004	(No short title)	An act to designate the facility of the United States Postal Service located at 3150 Great Northern Avenue in Missoula, Montana, as the "Mike Mansfield Post Office"	Pub. L. 108–440 (text) (PDF)
108-441	December 3, 2004	(No short title)	An act to improve access to physicians in medically underserved areas	Pub. L. 108–441 (text) (PDF)
108-442	December 3, 2004	(No short title)	An act to designate the facility of the United States Postal Service located at 1050 North Hills Boulevard in Reno, Nevada, as the "Guardians of Freedom Memorial Post Office Building" and to authorize the installation of a plaque at such site, and for other purposes	Pub. L. 108–442 (text) (PDF)
108-443	December 3, 2004	(No short title)	An act to designate the facility of the United States Postal Service located at 1475 Western Avenue, Suite 45, in Albany, New York, as the "Lieutenant John F. Finn Post Office"	Pub. L. 108–443 (text) (PDF)
108-444	December 3, 2004	Department of Veterans Affairs Health Care Personnel Enhancement Act of 2004	An act to amend the Livestock Mandatory Price Reporting Act of 1999 to modify the termination date for mandatory price reporting	Pub. L. 108–444 (text) (PDF)
108-446	December 3, 2004	Individuals with Disabilities Education Improvement Act of 2004	An act to reauthorize the Individuals with Disabilities Education Act, and for other purposes	Pub. L. 108–446 (text) (PDF)
108-447	December 8, 2004	Consolidated Appropriations Act, 2005	An act making appropriations for foreign operations, export financing, and related programs for the fiscal year ending September 30, 2005, and for other purposes	Pub. L. 108–447 (text) (PDF)
108-448	December 8, 2004	(No short title)	An act to amend title XIX of the Social Security Act to extend medicare cost- sharing for the medicare part B premium for qualifying individuals through September 2005	Pub. L. 108–448 (text) (PDF)
108-449	December 10, 2004	(No short title)	An act to amend and extend the Irish Peace Process Cultural and Training Program Act of 1998	Pub. L. 108–449 (text) (PDF)
108-450	December 10, 2004	District of Columbia Mental Health Civil Commitment Modernization Act of 2004	An act to amend title 21, District of Columbia Official Code, to enact the provisions of the Mental Health Civil Commitment Act of 2002 which affect the Commission on Mental Health and require action by Congress in order to take effect	Pub. L. 108–450 (text) (PDF)
108-451	December 10, 2004	Arizona Water Settlements Act	An act to provide for adjustments to the Central Arizona Project in Arizona, to authorize the Gila River Indian Community water rights settlement, to reauthorize and amend the Southern Arizona Water Rights Settlement Act of 1982, and for other purposes	Pub. L. 108–451 (text) (PDF)
108-452	December 10, 2004	Alaska Land Transfer Acceleration Act	An act to facilitate the transfer of land in the State of Alaska, and for other purposes	Pub. L. 108–452 (text) (PDF)
108-453	December 10, 2004	Cooperative Research and Technology Enhancement (CREATE) Act of 2004	An act to amend title 35, United States Code, to promote cooperative research involving universities, the public sector, and private enterprises	Pub. L. 108–453 (text) (PDF)
108-454	December 10, 2004	Veterans Benefits Improvement Act of 2004	An act to amend title 38, United States Code, to improve and extend housing, education, and other benefits under the laws administered by the Secretary of Veterans Affairs, and for other purposes	Pub. L. 108–454 (text) (PDF)
108-455	December 10, 2004	(No short title)	An act to extend the authority of the United States District Court for the Southern District of Iowa to hold court in Rock Island, Illinois	Pub. L. 108–455 (text) (PDF)
108-456	December 10, 2004	(No short title)	An act to reauthorize the Harmful Algal Bloom and Hypoxia Research and Control Act of 1998, and for other purposes	Pub. L. 108–456 (text) (PDF)
108-457	December 17, 2004	(No short title)	An act to amend the District of Columbia College Access Act of 1999 to reauthorize for 2 additional years the public school and private school tuition assistance programs established under the Act	Pub. L. 108–457 (text) (PDF)
108-458	December 17, 2004	Intelligence Reform and Terrorism Prevention Act of 2004	An act to reform the intelligence community and the intelligence and intelligence-related activities of the United States Government, and for other purposes	Pub. L. 108–458 (text) (PDF)
108-459	December 21, 2004	(No short title)	An act to redesignate the facility of the United States Postal Service located at 747 Broadway in Albany, New York, as the "United States Postal Service Henry Johnson Annex"	Pub. L. 108–459 (text) (PDF)
108-460	December 21, 2004	(No short title)	An act to provide for the conveyance of Federal lands, improvements, equipment, and resource materials at the Oxford Research Station in Granville County, North Carolina, to the State of North Carolina	Pub. L. 108–460 (text) (PDF)
108-461	December 21, 2004	(No short title)	An act to designate the United States courthouse located at 125 Bull Street in Savannah, Georgia, as the "Tomochichi United States Courthouse"	Pub. L. 108–461 (text) (PDF)
108-462	December 21, 2004	(No short title)	An act to designate the facility of the United States Geological Survey and the United States Bureau of Reclamation located at 230 Collins Road, Boise, Idaho, as the "F.H. Newell Building"	Pub. L. 108–462 (text) (PDF)
108-463	December 21, 2004	(No short title)	An act to designate the Federal building located at 324 Twenty-Fifth Street in Ogden, Utah, as the "James V. Hansen Federal Building"	Pub. L. 108–463 (text) (PDF)
108-464	December 21, 2004	Benjamin Franklin Commemorative Coin Act	An act to require the Secretary of the Treasury to mint coins in commemoration of the tercentenary of the birth of Benjamin Franklin, and for other purposes	Pub. L. 108–464 (text) (PDF)
108-465	December 21, 2004	Specialty Crops Competitiveness Act of 2004	An act to ensure an abundant and affordable supply of highly nutritious fruits, vegetables, and other specialty crops for American consumers and international markets by enhancing the competitiveness of United States- grown specialty crops, and for other purposes	Pub. L. 108–465 (text) (PDF)
108-466	December 21, 2004	(No short title)	An act to designate the Federal building located at Fifth and Richardson Avenues in Roswell, New Mexico, as the "Joe Skeen Federal Building"	Pub. L. 108–466 (text) (PDF)
108-467	December 21, 2004	(No short title)	An act to designate the Federal building and United States courthouse located at 615 East Houston Street in San Antonio, Texas, as the "Hipolito F. Garcia Federal Building and United States Courthouse"	Pub. L. 108–467 (text) (PDF)
108-468	December 21, 2004	(No short title)	An act to redesignate the facility of the United States Postal Service located at 4025 Feather Lakes Way in Kingwood, Texas, as the "Congressman Jack Fields Post Office"	Pub. L. 108–468 (text) (PDF)
108-469	December 21, 2004	Thrift Savings Plan Open Elections Act of 2004	An act to amend chapter 84 of title 5, United States Code, to provide for Federal employees to make elections to make, modify, and terminate contributions to the Thrift Savings Fund at any time, and for other purposes	Pub. L. 108–469 (text) (PDF)
108-470	December 21, 2004	(No short title)	An act to confirm the authority of the Secretary of Agriculture to collect approved State commodity assessments on behalf of the State from the proceeds of marketing assistance loans	Pub. L. 108–470 (text) (PDF)
108-471	December 21, 2004	(No short title)	An act to designate the facility of the United States Postal Service located at 140 Sacramento Street in Rio Vista, California, as the "Adam G. Kinser Post Office Building"	Pub. L. 108–471 (text) (PDF)
108-472	December 21, 2004	(No short title)	An act to designate the facility of the United States Postal Service located at 560 Bay Isles Road in Longboat Key, Florida, as the "Lieutenant General James V. Edmundson Post Office Building"	Pub. L. 108–472 (text) (PDF)
108-473	December 21, 2004	(No short title)	An act to designate the facility of the United States Postal Service located at 25 McHenry Street in Rosine, Kentucky, as the "Bill Monroe Post Office"	Pub. L. 108–473 (text) (PDF)
108-474	December 21, 2004	American History and Civics Education Act of 2004	An act to authorize grants to establish academies for teachers and students of American history and civics, and for other purposes	Pub. L. 108–474 (text) (PDF)
108-475	December 21, 2004	(No short title)	An act to designate the facility of the United States Postal Service located at 5505 Stevens Way in San Diego, California, as the "Earl B. Gilliam/ Imperial Avenue Post Office Building"	Pub. L. 108–475 (text) (PDF)
108-476	December 21, 2004	(No short title)	An act to treat certain arrangements maintained by the YMCA Retirement Fund as church plans for the purposes of certain provisions of the Internal Revenue Code of 1986, and for other purposes	Pub. L. 108–476 (text) (PDF)
108-477	December 21, 2004	(No short title)	An act to designate the facility of the United States Postal Service located at 4985 Moorhead Avenue in Boulder, Colorado, as the "Donald G. Brotzman Post Office Building"	Pub. L. 108–477 (text) (PDF)
108-478	December 21, 2004	(No short title)	An act to designate the facility of the United States Postal Service located at 103 East Kleberg in Kingsville, Texas, as the "Irma Rangel Post Office Building"	Pub. L. 108–478 (text) (PDF)
108-479	December 21, 2004	(No short title)	Joint resolution recognizing the 60th anniversary of the Battle of Peleliu and the end of Imperial Japanese control of Palau during World War II and urging the Secretary of the Interior to work to protect the historic sites of the Peleliu Battlefield National Historic Landmark and to establish commemorative programs honoring the Americans who fought there	Pub. L. 108–479 (text) (PDF)
108-480	December 23, 2004	(No short title)	An act to authorize funds for an educational center for the Castillo de San Marcos National Monument, and for other purposes	Pub. L. 108–480 (text) (PDF)
108-481	December 23, 2004	Kilauea Point National Wildlife Refuge Expansion Act of 2004	An act to provide for the expansion of Kilauea Point National Wildlife Refuge	Pub. L. 108–481 (text) (PDF)
108-482	December 23, 2004	Intellectual Property Protection and Courts Amendments Act of 2004	An act to prevent and punish counterfeiting of copyrighted copies and phonorecords, and for other purposes	Pub. L. 108–482 (text) (PDF)
108-483	December 23, 2004	(No short title)	An act to authorize the exchange of certain land in Everglades National Park	Pub. L. 108–483 (text) (PDF)
108-484	December 23, 2004	Microenterprise Results and Accountability Act of 2004	An act to amend the Foreign Assistance Act of 1961 to improve the results and accountability of microenterprise development assistance programs, and for other purposes	Pub. L. 108–484 (text) (PDF)
108-485	December 23, 2004	(No short title)	An act to authorize the Secretary of Commerce to make available to the University of Miami property under the administrative jurisdiction of the National Oceanic and Atmospheric Administration on Virginia Key, Florida, for use by the university for a Marine Life Science Center	Pub. L. 108–485 (text) (PDF)
108-486	December 23, 2004	American Bald Eagle Recovery and National Emblem Commemorative Coin Act	An act to require the Secretary of the Treasury to mint coins celebrating the recovery and restoration of the American bald eagle, the national symbol of the United States, to America's lands, waterways, and skies and the great importance of the designation of the American bald eagle as an "endangered" species under the Endangered Species Act of 1973, and for other purposes	Pub. L. 108–486 (text) (PDF)
108-487	December 23, 2004	(No short title)	An act to authorize appropriations for fiscal year 2005 for intelligence and intelligence-related activities of the United States Government, the Community Management Account, and the Central Intelligence Agency Retirement and Disability System, and for other purposes	Pub. L. 108–487 (text) (PDF)
108-488	December 23, 2004	(No short title)	An act to provide for the development of a national plan for the control and management of Sudden Oak Death, a tree disease caused by the fungus-like pathogen Phytophthora ramorum, and for other purposes	Pub. L. 108–488 (text) (PDF)
108-489	December 23, 2004	District of Columbia Retirement Protection Improvement Act of 2004	An act to amend the Balanced Budget Act of 1997 to improve the administration of Federal pension benefit payments for District of Columbia teachers, police officers, and fire fighters, and for other purposes	Pub. L. 108–489 (text) (PDF)
108-490	December 23, 2004	(No short title)	An act to amend section 340E of the Public Health Service Act (relating to children's hospitals) to modify provisions regarding the determination of the amount of payments for indirect expenses associated with operating approved graduate medical residency training programs	Pub. L. 108–490 (text) (PDF)
108-491	December 23, 2004	(No short title)	An act to authorize salary adjustments for Justices and judges of the United States for fiscal year 2005	Pub. L. 108–491 (text) (PDF)
108-492	December 23, 2004	Commercial Space Launch Amendments Act of 2004	An act to promote the development of the emerging commercial human space flight industry, and for other purposes	Pub. L. 108–492 (text) (PDF)
108-493	December 23, 2004	(No short title)	An act to amend the Internal Revenue Code of 1986 to modify the taxation of arrow components	Pub. L. 108–493 (text) (PDF)
108-494	December 23, 2004	(No short title)	An act to amend the National Telecommunications and Information Administration Organization Act to facilitate the reallocation of spectrum from governmental to commercial users; to improve, enhance, and promote the Nation's homeland security, public safety, and citizen activated emergency response capabilities through the use of enhanced 911 services, to further upgrade Public Safety Answering Point capabilities and related functions in receiving E-911 calls, and to support in the construction and operation of a ubiquitous and reliable citizen activated system; and to provide that funds received as universal service contributions under section 254 of the Communications Act of 1934 and the universal service support programs established pursuant thereto are not subject to certain provisions of title 31, United States Code, commonly known as the Antideficiency Act, for a period of time	Pub. L. 108–494 (text) (PDF)
108-495	December 23, 2004	Video Voyeurism Prevention Act of 2004	An act to amend title 18, United States Code, to prohibit video voyeurism in the special maritime and territorial jurisdiction of the United States, and for other purposes	Pub. L. 108–495 (text) (PDF)
108-496	December 23, 2004	Federal Employee Dental and Vision Benefits Enhancement Act of 2004	An act to amend part III of title 5, United States Code, to provide for the establishment of programs under which supplemental dental and vision benefits are made available to Federal employees, retirees, and their dependents, to expand the contracting authority of the Office of Personnel Management, and for other purposes	Pub. L. 108–496 (text) (PDF)
108-497	December 23, 2004	Comprehensive Peace in Sudan Act of 2004	An act to express the sense of Congress regarding the conflict in Darfur, Sudan, to provide assistance for the crisis in Darfur and for comprehensive peace in Sudan, and for other purposes	Pub. L. 108–497 (text) (PDF)
108-498	December 23, 2004	(No short title)	An act to limit the transfer of certain Commodity Credit Corporation funds between conservation programs for technical assistance for the programs	Pub. L. 108–498 (text) (PDF)

== Private laws ==
Private law number (Linked to Wikisource)	Date of enactment	Official short title	Description	Citation
108-1	July 22, 2004	(No short title)	An act for the relief of Lindita Idrizi Heath	118 Stat. 4021
108-2	October 5, 2004	Railroad Right-of-Way Conveyance Validation Act of 2004	An act to amend the Railroad Right-of-Way Conveyance Validation Act to validate additional conveyances of certain lands in the State of California that form part of the right-of-way granted by the United States to facilitate the construction of the transcontinental railway, and for other purposes	118 Stat. 4025
108-3	October 30, 2004	(No short title)	An act for the relief of Richi James Lesley	118 Stat. 4026
108-4	October 30, 2004	(No short title)	An act for the relief of Durreshahwar Durreshahwar, Nida Hasan, Asna Hasan, Anum Hasan, and Iqra Hasan	118 Stat. 4028
108-5	December 3, 2004	(No short title)	An act for the relief of Rocco A. Trecosta of Fort Lauderdale, Florida	118 Stat. 4030
108-6	December 23, 2004	(No short title)	An act for the relief of Tanya Andrea Goudeau	118 Stat. 4032

== Treaties ==
No treaties were enacted during this Congress.

== See also ==
- List of United States federal legislation
- List of acts of the 107th United States Congress
- List of acts of the 109th United States Congress
