= Lindita =

Lindita may refer to:

- Lindita (given name)
- Lindita (singer)
- Lindita Peak, a mountain in Alaska
