= Assistive Technology Acts =

Assistive Technology Acts provide federal funding from the U.S. Department of Education to each state and territory to support "State efforts to improve the provision of assistive technology to individuals with disabilities of all ages through comprehensive statewide programs of technology-related assistance." Assistive Technologies are equipment, items or devices used to improve or keep the functionality of an individual with a disability. This will allow an individual with a disability to be more independent in life, this includes: education, recreation, and any daily activity. The services being offered for Assistive Technology include being able to use AT devices, assessment for the devices, and any maintenance included, such as customization, repair, and training. Under the Assistive Technology laws, federal grants are granted to each state to fund an Assistive Technology Act Project (ATAP) which provide services for individuals with disabilities, their families, guardians and more for their life span. The act, first passed in 1988, expires each years and needs to be continuously renewed to ensure the services can still be used.

Currently, there are 56 State AT programs. There are programs for all 50 states, 4 US territories, and for Puerto Rico and the District of Columbia. For the approximately 50,000,000 individuals with disabilities in the United States, these programs are available to provide them with assistance in selecting and acquiring assistive technology, defined as any device that would help them perform tasks that would otherwise be difficult or impossible. The 56 grantees are mandated in carrying out their respected specific state level and state leadership activities. The grantees must inform individuals with disabilities on Assistive Technologies, where to receive them, and how to obtain the Assistive Technologies.

== History ==
The Technology-Related Assistance for Individuals with Disabilities Act (Pub. L. 100–407), first passed in 1988, reauthorized in 1994 (Pub. L. 103–218) and again in 1998 (Pub. L. 105–394 (text) (PDF)). It was designated as a systems change grant and is often called the "Tech Act" for short. Congress passed this legislation to increase access to, availability of, and funding for assistive technology through state efforts and national initiatives. The 1998 law reaffirmed that technology is a valuable tool that can be used to improve the lives of Americans with disabilities. With the help of the government many people would be allowed access to equipment and devices they never thought they would get a chance to own.

Every state and territory of the United States was awarded a Tech Act project. The first group of projects started in 1989. Each state project had five years of funding under the 1989 law. A competitive grant application was required to receive an additional five years of funds. Projects were assured of eight years of full funding; the ninth year at 75% of full funding; and the tenth year as a Tech Act project at 50% of full funding.

Legislation supporting the state assistive technology projects was scheduled to sunset on September 30, 2004. The Assistive Technology Act of 2004 (Pub. L. 108–364 (text) (PDF)) reauthorized the assistive technology programs in all states and territories for five years as a formula-based program, and removed the sunset provision from the law.

== Assistive Technology Act of 2004 ==
The Assistive Technology Act of 2004, signed by President George W. Bush, ensured major funding for the assistive technology was continued. The continuation of the act has allowed many people with a disability to continue to participate in everyday activities. While this act was created in 1988, many changes occurred when it was continued in 2004. One of the major changes brought about by the Assistive Technology Act of 2004 was a change in purpose. Previous Acts focused on helping states build "systems for improving access to assistive technology devices for individuals with disabilities." The Assistive Technology Act of 2004 changes prior law from the Assistive Technology Act of 1998 to revise and reauthorize the Assistive Technology Act programs. The changes in the Assistive Technology Act allow the Secretary of Education to make Assistive Technology grants go to States to maintain statewide programs. The program will help individuals with disabilities, family members, guardians, authorized representatives, and advocates in obtaining Assistive Technologies'. In addition, the changes in 2004 to the Assistive Technology grants requires states to use the money for state level activities. State level activities include financing systems, which include loan programs to aid in access and funding for Assistive Technology services and devices. An Assistive Technology Device Loan allows individuals to borrow an Assistive Technology for a limited period of time to use and determine if the device meets their needs prior to them purchasing an Assistive Technology product. Also, Assistive Technology State Financing services allow individuals with disabilities to purchase/acquire financial loans that provide Assistive Technologies to consumers at lower costs through non-Assistive Technology Act sources or out of pocket money. In addition, the program will help with device reutilization which helps consumers get their products repaired, refurbished, and reassigned. Assistive Technology Reutilization services allows for other individuals with disabilities to reuse Assistive Technologies that are no longer used or needed by the original owner. This allows individuals with disabilities to receive an Assistive Technology with substantial cost savings. Also, this program will help find loans for devices with demonstrations that will aid in the informative processes.

== Accomplishments of State Tech Act Programs ==
Due to the efforts of the State Tech Act Programs, millions of Americans with disabilities are able to go to work, go to school, participate in recreation activities, and be contributing members of their communities. The State Program accomplishments are summarized each year as part of the Tech Act reporting requirements. A summary of these accomplishments is compiled by the Association of Assistive Technology Act Programs; complete copies of each State Plan can be found at the National Information System for Assistive Technology.

The Association of Assistive Technology Act Program (ATAP) is a national non-profit organization founded in 1997 and funded by the federal Assistive Technology Act to oversees state AT programs. ATAP formed an assistive technology network for states to share resources, discuss issues, give support, conduct research, advocate for programs and laws, and provide access to assistive technology. The ATAP looks to, "maintain and enhance a strong, effective, and efficient national network of Statewide Assistive Technology Programs..." Not only do these programs look to provide the necessary equipment but enhancing the effectiveness of the programs on all levels. These programs need to be recognized and as more legislation is passed more attention will be drawn to all assistive technology has done to help individuals with disabilities.

Each State have their own personally designed plans which can be found at the National Information System for Assistive Technology. Once a state is chosen you will find that specific state's assistive technology name along with the address and where to contact them at. Under that information you will then find a description of the state's assistive technology was created, how it meets the state's requirements, and a brief description of the technology provided. Under the description, the user will then find the Program Profile which is divided into six sections:

- The first section states the Statewide Assistive Technology Program Profile, Lead Agency, Implementing Entity, and Program Title.

- The second section will provide information regarding, State Financing Activities with details on what will be accomplished and how those specific activities will be carried out.

- The third section is a description on Device Reutilization and explains the development research effective reutilization programs within the state and how the state will implement those device reutilization programs.

- The fourth section touches on the subject of Device Loan which indicates whether specific state's have device loan programs and implementations of those programs.

- The fifth section is Device Demonstration where the state will indicate if the Assistive Technology Act is funding to support demonstration centers and if there are independent learning centers that funding from the state is being received to operate demonstration centers.

- The sixth and final section describes State Leadership Activities which includes the programs development and training are being implemented to targeted entities. Along with those, the state will indicate whether it is providing toll-free information and referral service, public service announcements on different platforms such as radio stations and television, and if the state is issuing briefs and informational articles in regards to bring awareness to Assistive Technology.

Every state has different programs and personally designed plans based on the individuals living in that state, to learn about your state go ahead and visit the National Information System for Assistive Technology.

== Workforce Innovation and Opportunity Act ==
Workforce Innovation and Opportunity Act (WIOA) was signed into law by President Barack Obama on July 22, 2014. WIOA provides people seeking work with access to employment, high-quality jobs, education, training, support services for people with disabilities and connects skilled workers with employers to improve the United States public workforce system. WIOA affected the Assistive Technology Act of 2004 by moving the AT Act administration from the Rehabilitation Services Administration in the Department of Education to the Administration for Community of Living in the Department of Health and Human Services. The Administration of Community Living runs the Sections 4, 5 and 6 of the AT Act programs and activities. WIOA moved the National Institute on Disability, Independent living, and Rehabilitation Research from the Department of Education to the Administration for Community of Living (ACL). Placing all these disability services programs together allows ACL "to maximize the independence, well-being, and health of older adults and people with disabilities, and the families and caregivers of both" and fulfill their mission to provide people with disabilities a quality life.
