= Lindita (given name) =

- Gender: Female
- Language: Albanian

Origin
- Region of origin: Albania, Kosovo

Lindita is an Albanian female given name, with the meaning "the day is born" - "lind dita".

Notable people bearing this name include:

- Lindita Arapi (born 1972), Albanian writer and journalist
- Lindita Halimi (born 1989), Albanian Kosovar singer and songwriter
- Lindita Idrizi (born 1996), Albanian model
- Lindita Kodra (born 1962), Albanian shooter
- Lindita Nikolla (born 1965), Albanian politician
