= 2008 United States House of Representatives elections in Texas =

- November 4, 2008

All 32 Texas seats to the United States House of Representatives
- Turnout: 7,528,622 - 40%
	Majority party	Minority party
Party	Republican	Democratic
Seats before	19	13
Seats won	20	12
Seat change	▲1	▼1
Popular vote	4,203,917	2,979,398
Percentage	55.84%	39.57%
Swing	▲3.5%	▼4.7%

Republican
40–50%
50–60%
60–70%
70–80%
80–90%
90>%
Democratic
40–50%
50–60%
60–70%
70–80%
80–90%
90>%

The 2008 elections for the Texas delegation of the United States House of Representatives was held on November 4, 2008. 31 of 32 congressional seats that make up the state's delegation were contested. In Texas's 14th congressional district no one challenged incumbent Ron Paul. Since Representatives are elected for two-year terms, those elected will serve in the 111th United States Congress from January 4, 2009, until January 3, 2011.

The 2008 presidential election, 2008 Senate election, and elections to the Texas House and Texas Senate occurred on the same date, as well as many local elections and ballot initiatives.

Despite widespread success for Democrats nationwide, Republicans gained one seat.

== Overview ==
2008 United States House of Representatives elections in Texas
Party	Votes	Percentage	Seats before	Seats after	+/–
Republican	4,203,917	55.84%	19	20	+1
Democratic	2,979,398	39.57%	13	12	-1
Libertarian	302,145	4.01%	0	0	0
Independent	43,162	0.57%	0	0	0
Totals	7,528,622	100.00%	32	32	—

== District 1 ==
2008 Texas's 1st congressional district election
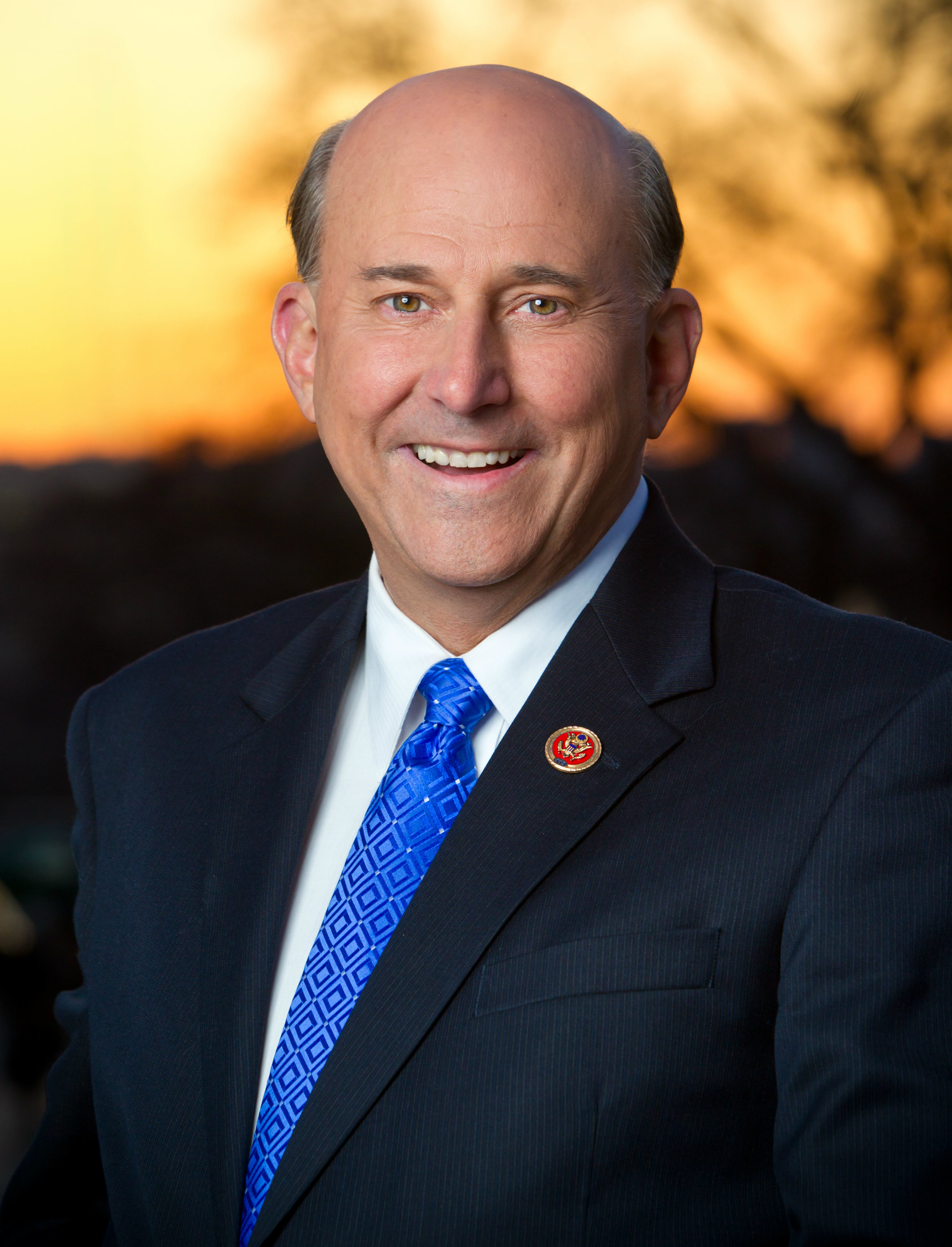

Nominee	Louie Gohmert	Roger L. Owen
Party	Republican	Independent
Popular vote	189,012	26,814
Percentage	87.6%	12.4%
- County results Gohmert: 70–80% 80–90% 90–100%
U.S. Representative before election
Louie Gohmert
Republican
Elected U.S. Representative
Louie Gohmert
Republican

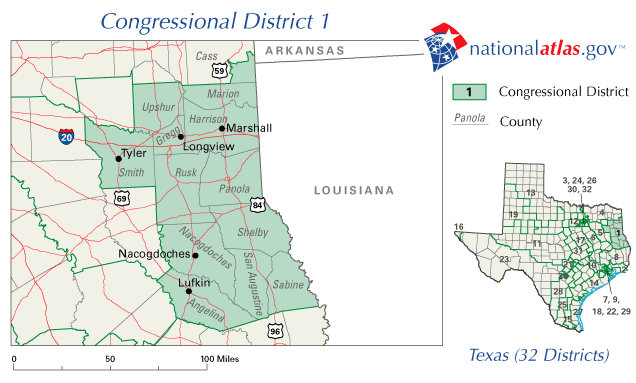

Sophomore Republican Louie Gohmert of Tyler was elected in 2004 following a controversial redistricting in 2003 by then-House Majority Leader Tom DeLay that moved the district of incumbent Democrat Max Sandlin into a strongly Republican constituency. Sandlin was defeated by a 24-point margin in 2004, and Gohmert won in 2006 with 68% of the vote. The district is a purely East Texas one stretching from the Tyler and Longview–Marshall areas in the north to the Lufkin–Nacogdoches area due south. Gohmert was renominated, while no Democrats ran in the 2008 primary.

=== Predictions ===
Source	Ranking	As of
The Cook Political Report	Safe R	November 6, 2008
Rothenberg	Safe R	November 2, 2008
Sabato's Crystal Ball	Safe R	November 6, 2008
Real Clear Politics	Safe R	November 7, 2008
CQ Politics	Safe R	November 6, 2008

Texas's 1st congressional district, 2008
Party	Candidate	Votes	%
Republican	Louie Gohmert (incumbent)	189,012	87.58
Independent	Roger L. Owen	26,814	12.42
Total votes		215,826	100
Republican hold			

== District 2 ==
2008 Texas's 2nd congressional district election
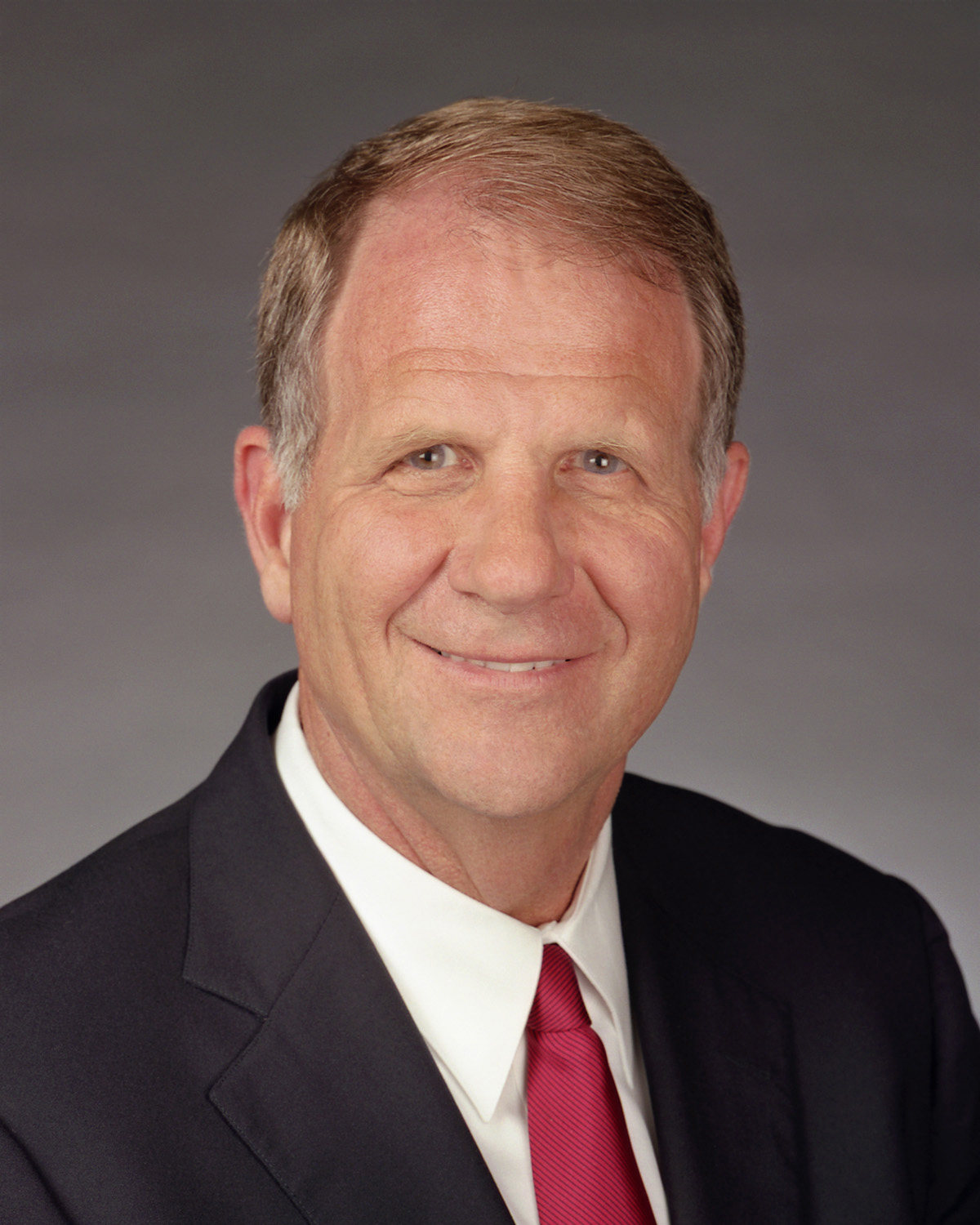

Nominee	Ted Poe	Craig Wolfe
Party	Republican	Libertarian
Popular vote	175,101	21,813
Percentage	88.9%	11.1%
- County results Poe: 80–90%
U.S. Representative before election
Ted Poe
Republican
Elected U.S. Representative
Ted Poe
Republican

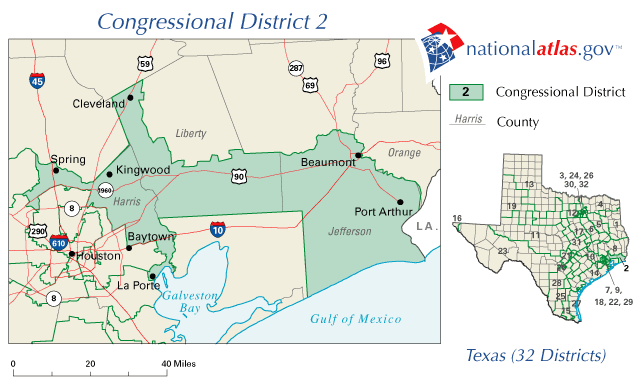

Republican Ted Poe of Humble was one of four Republicans who defeated a Democratic challenger (Nick Lampson, now representing District 22) in the 2004 elections. Poe won 56% of the vote in 2004 and 66% in 2006, making him one of only a handful of Republicans who gained from the previous election (In 2006, Democrats, who won control of the House from Republicans, generally improved on their 2004 margins). The district stretches from the northern Harris County and Houston suburbs of Spring and Kingwood to southern Liberty County and much of the Golden Triangle region. Poe was renominated, while no Democrats ran in the 2008 primary. The Libertarian Party nominated Craig Wolfe.

=== Predictions ===
Source	Ranking	As of
The Cook Political Report	Safe R	November 6, 2008
Rothenberg	Safe R	November 2, 2008
Sabato's Crystal Ball	Safe R	November 6, 2008
Real Clear Politics	Safe R	November 7, 2008
CQ Politics	Safe R	November 6, 2008

Texas's 2nd congressional district, 2008
Party	Candidate	Votes	%
Republican	Ted Poe (incumbent)	175,101	88.92
Libertarian	Craig Wolfe	21,813	11.08
Total votes		196,914	100
Republican hold			

== District 3 ==
2008 Texas's 3rd congressional district election
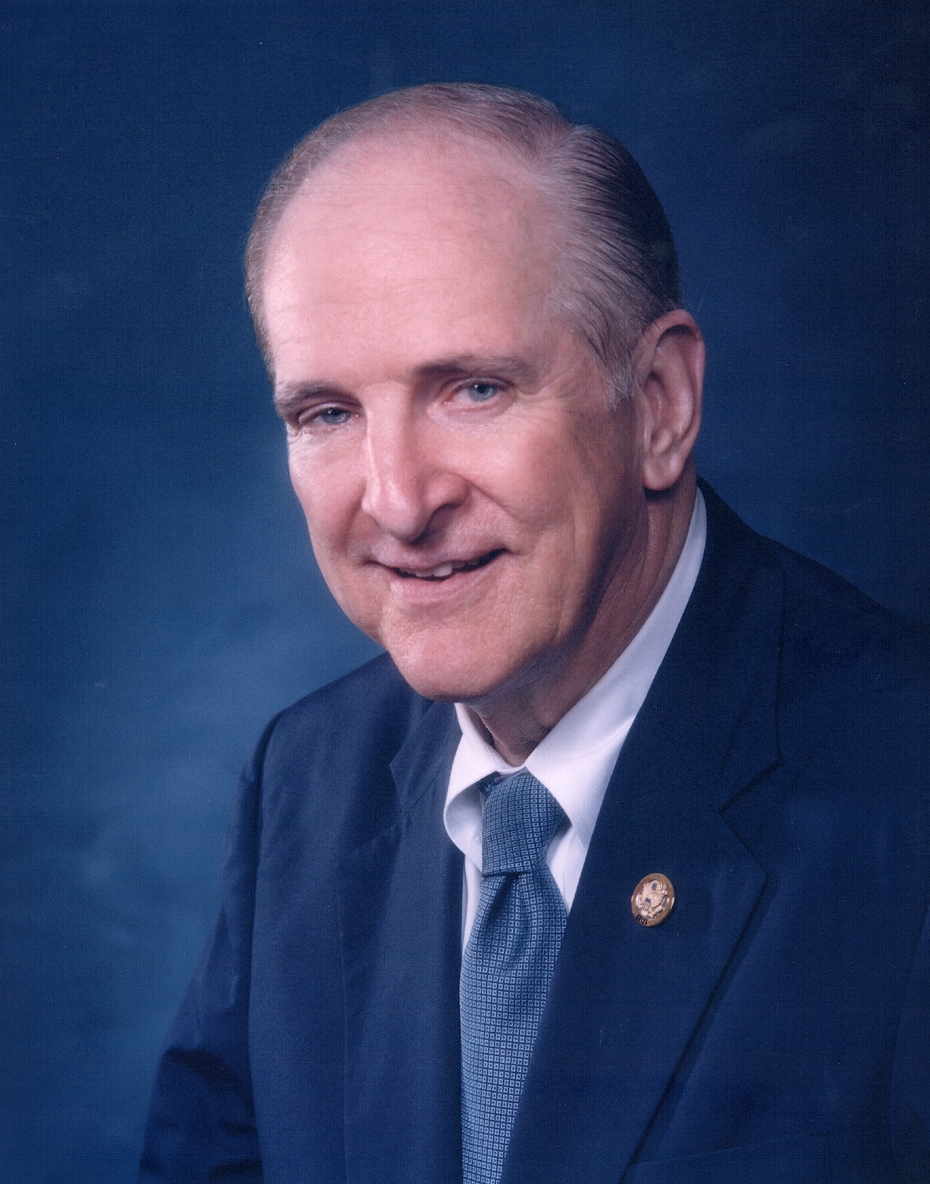

Nominee	Sam Johnson	Tom Daley
Party	Republican	Democratic
Popular vote	170,742	108,693
Percentage	59.8%	38.0%
- County results Johnson: 50–60% 60–70%
U.S. Representative before election
Sam Johnson
Republican
Elected U.S. Representative
Sam Johnson
Republican

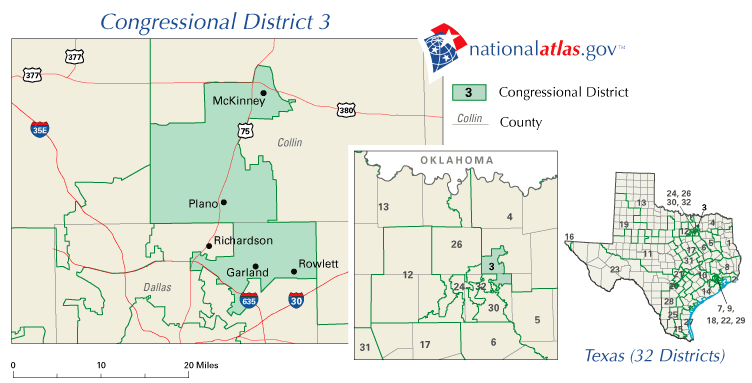

Longtime Republican Sam Johnson of Plano was 78 in 2008 but chose not to retire. He won the Republican nomination. Tom Daley was the Democratic nominee and Christopher J. Claytor was the Libertarian nominee.

This district includes several northern and northeastern suburbs of Dallas, including southwestern Collin County (including Plano and McKinney) and northeastern Dallas County including large portions of Garland and Richardson, as well as some northern portions of Dallas itself. The district is heavily Caucasian, upper-middle class, and Republican, with incomes averaging around the $75,000 range.

=== Predictions ===
Source	Ranking	As of
The Cook Political Report	Safe R	November 6, 2008
Rothenberg	Safe R	November 2, 2008
Sabato's Crystal Ball	Safe R	November 6, 2008
Real Clear Politics	Safe R	November 7, 2008
CQ Politics	Safe R	November 6, 2008

Texas's 3rd congressional district, 2008
Party	Candidate	Votes	%
Republican	Sam Johnson (incumbent)	170,742	59.75
Democratic	Tom Daley	108,693	38.03
Libertarian	Christopher J. Claytor	6,348	2.22
Total votes		285,783	100
Republican hold			

== District 4 ==
2008 Texas's 4th congressional district election
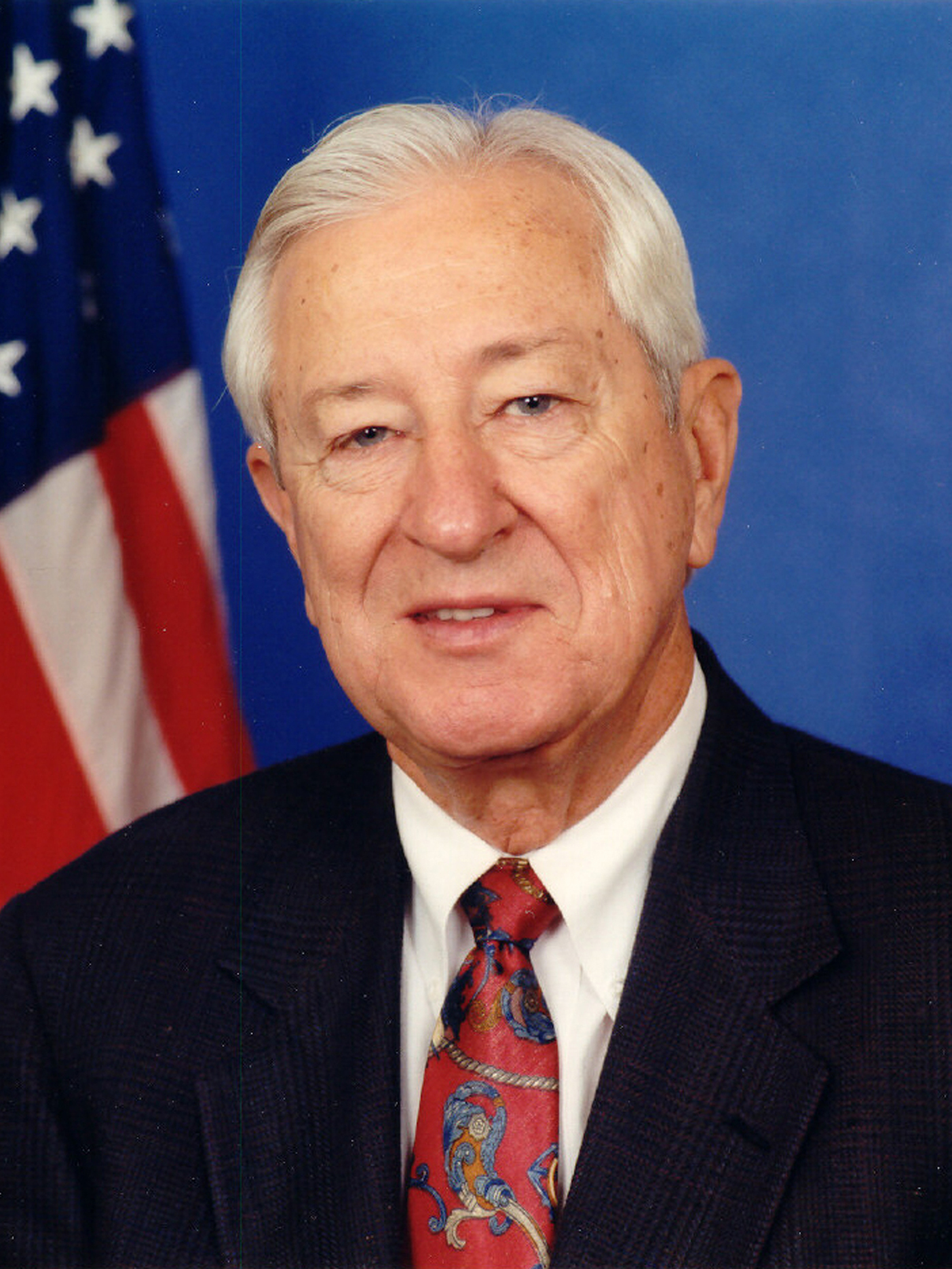

Nominee	Ralph M. Hall	Glenn Melancon
Party	Republican	Democratic
Popular vote	206,906	88,067
Percentage	68.8%	29.3%
- County results Hall: 50–60% 60–70% 70–80%
U.S. Representative before election
Ralph M. Hall
Republican
Elected U.S. Representative
Ralph M. Hall
Republican

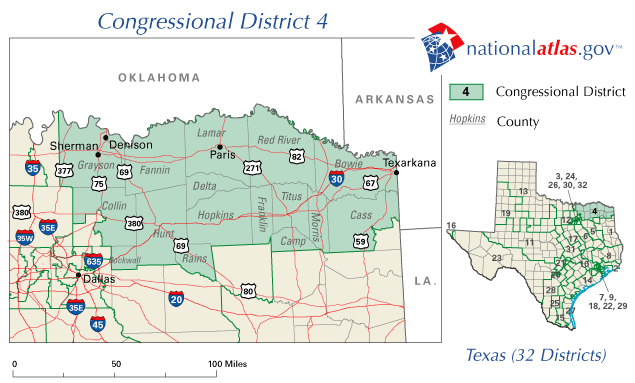

Republican Ralph Hall of Rockwall, the oldest living member of the House of Representatives at the time, faced Democratic nominee Glenn Melancon. CQ Politics considered the race 'Safe Republican'.

Hall has represented the district since 1980, first elected as an "old-time" conservative Democrat before becoming a Republican in 2004. He won the 2008 primary election, defeating foreign relations expert Joshua Kowert; businessman and NASCAR team owner Gene Christensen; and former Frisco mayor Kathy Seei.

This Northeast Texas district encompasses the Ark-La-Tex, the Rockwall County suburbs of Dallas, and the Sherman–Denison area.

=== Predictions ===
Source	Ranking	As of
The Cook Political Report	Safe R	November 6, 2008
Rothenberg	Safe R	November 2, 2008
Sabato's Crystal Ball	Safe R	November 6, 2008
Real Clear Politics	Safe R	November 7, 2008
CQ Politics	Safe R	November 6, 2008

Texas's 4th congressional district, 2008
Party	Candidate	Votes	%
Republican	Ralph M. Hall (incumbent)	206,906	68.80
Democratic	Glenn Melancon	88,067	29.28
Libertarian	Fred Annett	5,771	1.92
Total votes		300,744	100
Republican hold			

== District 5 ==
2008 Texas's 5th congressional district election
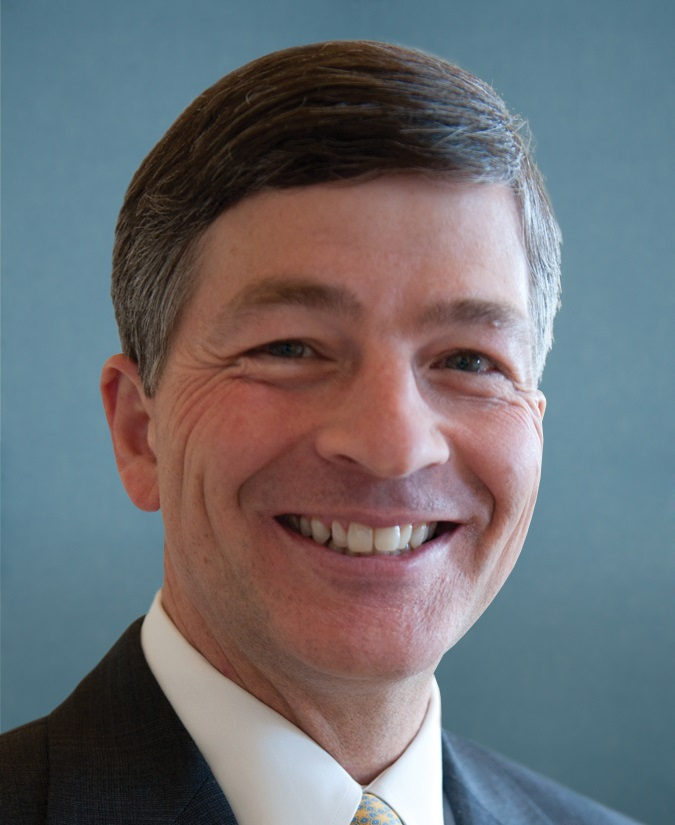

Nominee	Jeb Hensarling	Ken Ashby
Party	Republican	Libertarian
Popular vote	162,894	31,967
Percentage	83.6%	16.4%
- County results Hensarling: 70–80% 80–90%
U.S. Representative before election
Jeb Hensarling
Republican
Elected U.S. Representative
Jeb Hensarling
Republican

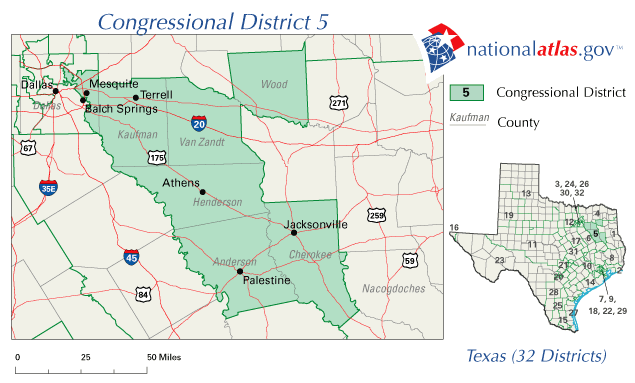

Jeb Hensarling, a Republican from Dallas, was first elected in 2002 to a heavily Republican district comprising east Dallas and its neighboring suburbs, and stretching to the south and east to a number of small East Texas counties. A favorite among fiscal conservatives in Texas, Hensarling is a potential challenger for the U.S. Senate in 2012 should the incumbent Republican, Kay Bailey Hutchison, retire. In 2008, Hensarling is expected to win another term in this district despite recent Democratic gains in Dallas County. Hensarling was renominated, while no Democrats ran in the 2008 primary.

=== Predictions ===
Source	Ranking	As of
The Cook Political Report	Safe R	November 6, 2008
Rothenberg	Safe R	November 2, 2008
Sabato's Crystal Ball	Safe R	November 6, 2008
Real Clear Politics	Safe R	November 7, 2008
CQ Politics	Safe R	November 6, 2008

Texas's 5th congressional district, 2008
Party	Candidate	Votes	%
Republican	Jeb Hensarling (incumbent)	162,894	83.59
Libertarian	Ken Ashby	31,967	16.41
Total votes		194,861	100
Republican hold			

== District 6 ==
2008 Texas's 6th congressional district election
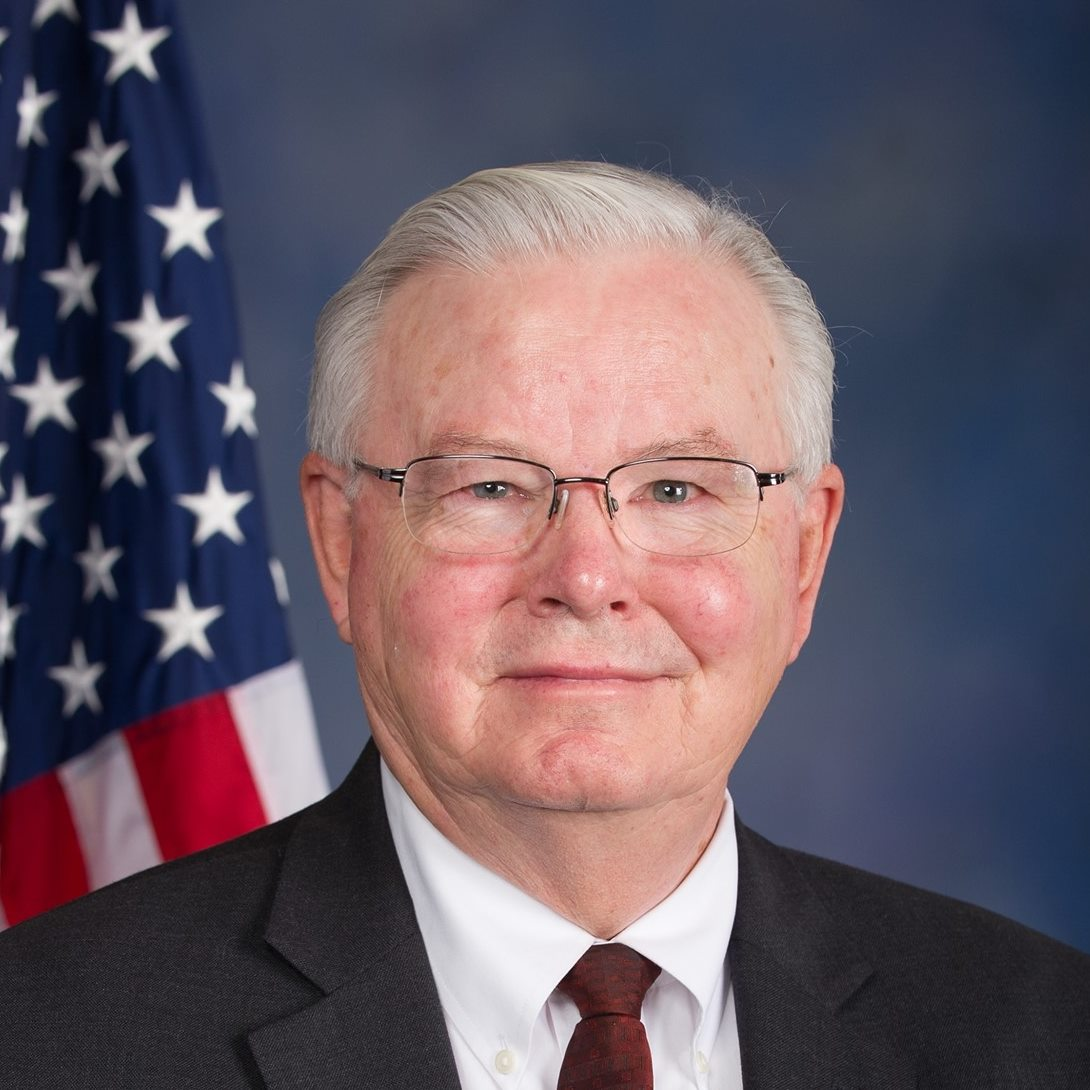

Nominee	Joe Barton	Ludwig Otto
Party	Republican	Democratic
Popular vote	174,008	99,919
Percentage	62.0%	35.6%
- County results Barton: 50–60% 60–70% 70–80%
U.S. Representative before election
Joe Barton
Republican
Elected U.S. Representative
Joe Barton
Republican

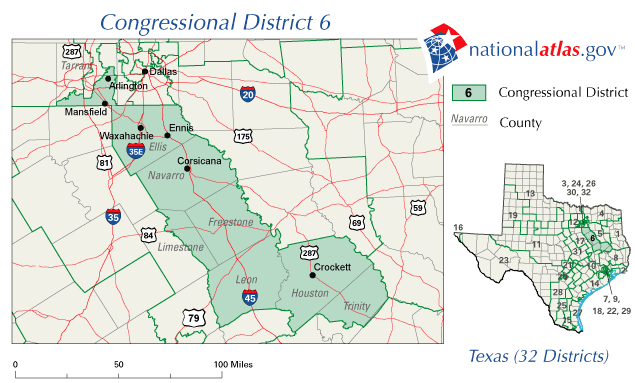

Twelve-term Republican Joe Barton of Ennis was the chair of the House Energy and Commerce Committee until Democrats took over the House in 2006. The district stretches from Arlington southward to several east central Texas counties all the way to Trinity County, which is west of Lufkin and is heavily Republican. Barton won the 2008 primary, and faced Democratic winner Ludwig Otto in the general election.

=== Predictions ===
Source	Ranking	As of
The Cook Political Report	Safe R	November 6, 2008
Rothenberg	Safe R	November 2, 2008
Sabato's Crystal Ball	Safe R	November 6, 2008
Real Clear Politics	Safe R	November 7, 2008
CQ Politics	Safe R	November 6, 2008

Texas's 6th congressional district, 2008
Party	Candidate	Votes	%
Republican	Joe Barton (incumbent)	174,008	62.02
Democratic	Ludwig Otto	99,919	35.61
Libertarian	Max Koch	6,655	2.37
Total votes		280,582	100
Republican hold			

== District 7 ==
2008 Texas's 7th congressional district election
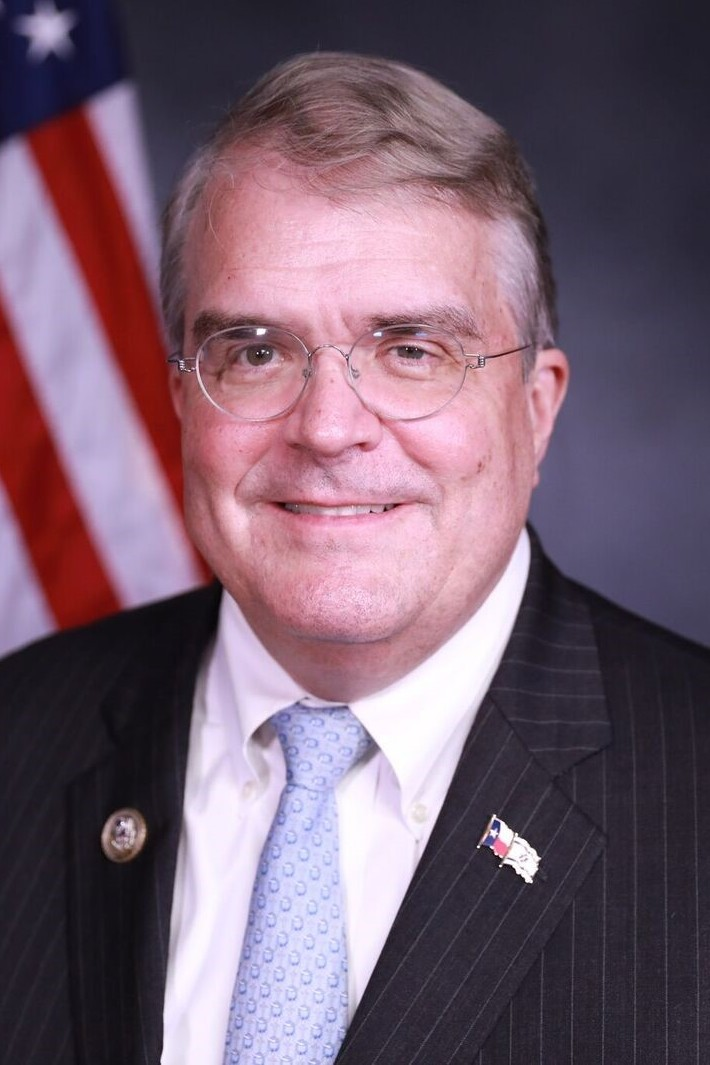

Nominee	John Culberson	Michael Skelly
Party	Republican	Democratic
Popular vote	162,635	123,242
Percentage	55.9%	42.4%
- County results Culberson: 50–60%
U.S. Representative before election
John Culberson
Republican
Elected U.S. Representative
John Culberson
Republican

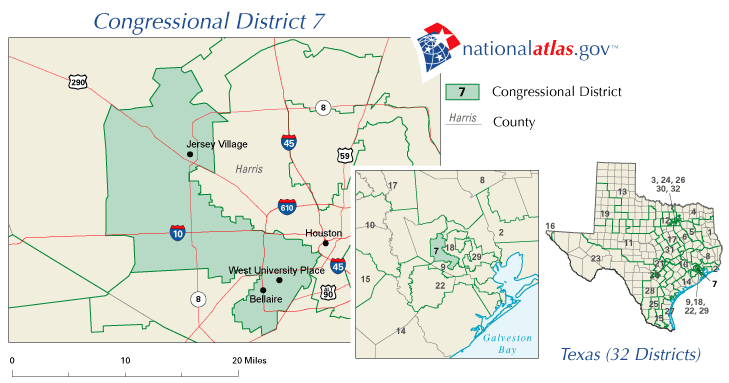

Incumbent Republican John Culberson faced Democratic businessman Michael Skelly in this Houston area district. CQ Politics considered this race 'Leans Republican'.

Culberson won a surprisingly modest 59% of the vote in 2006 in what is otherwise a normally strong Republican district. He was still favored to win in 2008, given the 2006 anti-Republican trend and the normally Republican voting trend of this mainly suburban district, which is among the most affluent in the nation. Skelly, a former executive of Horizon Wind Energy, earned an MBA from Harvard after serving in the Peace Corps. He currently serves on Houston Mayor Bill White's Green Building Advisory Committee.

The district, which was once represented by former President George H. W. Bush, includes much of heavily Republican west Houston—such as River Oaks, Uptown and Upper Kirby, Memorial/Spring Branch area, and the island cities of Bellaire, West University Place, and Jersey Village, as well as many unincorporated areas of northwest Harris County including a large chunk of the Cypress-Fairbanks area. The district also includes the heavily Democratic Neartown area. No Democrat has served this district since 1966, before the district was based in its current location.

=== Predictions ===
Source	Ranking	As of
The Cook Political Report	Lean R	November 6, 2008
Rothenberg	Likely R	November 2, 2008
Sabato's Crystal Ball	Lean R	November 6, 2008
Real Clear Politics	Safe R	November 7, 2008
CQ Politics	Lean R	November 6, 2008

Texas's 7th congressional district, 2008
Party	Candidate	Votes	%
Republican	John Culberson (incumbent)	162,635	55.90
Democratic	Michael Skelly	123,242	42.36
Libertarian	Drew Parks	5,057	1.74
Total votes		290,934	100
Republican hold			

== District 8 ==
2008 Texas's 8th congressional district election
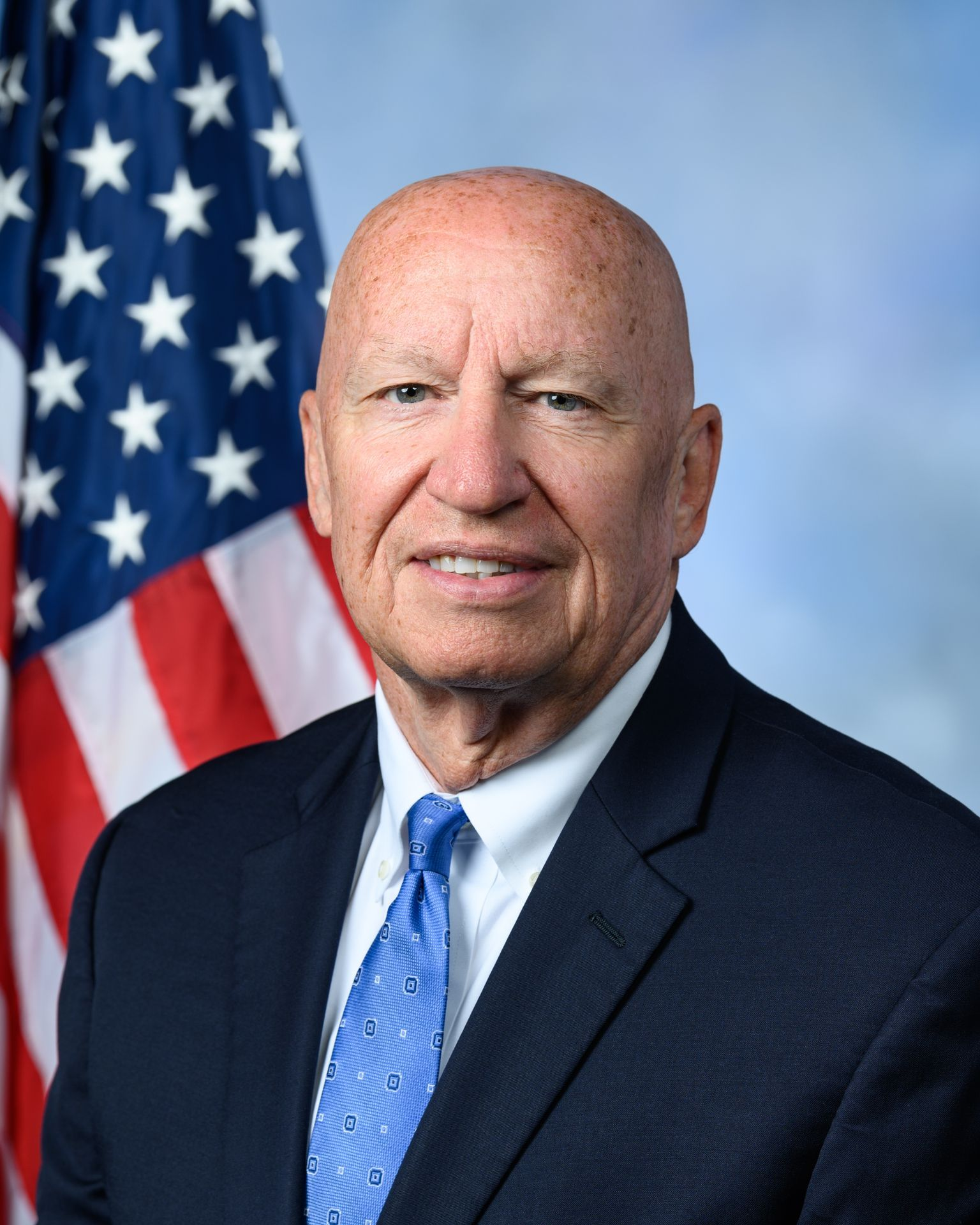

Nominee	Kevin Brady	Kent Hargett
Party	Republican	Democratic
Popular vote	207,128	70,758
Percentage	72.6%	24.8%
- County results Brady: 50–60% 60–70% 70–80%
U.S. Representative before election
Kevin Brady
Republican
Elected U.S. Representative
Kevin Brady
Republican

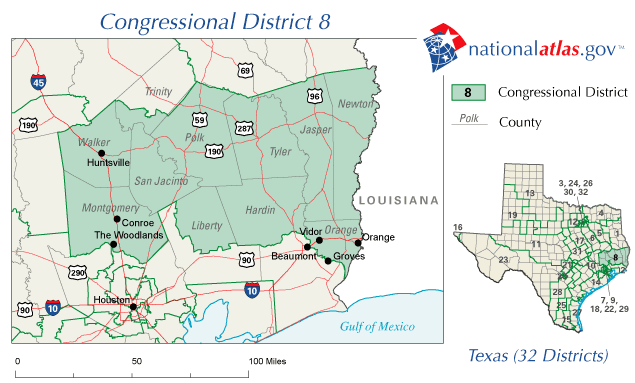

Republican Kevin Brady of The Woodlands represents a strongly GOP district centered on the northern suburbs and exurbs of Houston and Beaumont as well as the Huntsville and Lake Livingston areas, winning two thirds of the vote in 2004 and 2006. The district was expected to remain in Republican hands; no Democrat has won this district 1978. Brady won the 2008 primary and faced Democrat Kent Hargett.

=== Predictions ===
Source	Ranking	As of
The Cook Political Report	Safe R	November 6, 2008
Rothenberg	Safe R	November 2, 2008
Sabato's Crystal Ball	Safe R	November 6, 2008
Real Clear Politics	Safe R	November 7, 2008
CQ Politics	Safe R	November 6, 2008

Texas's 8th congressional district, 2008
Party	Candidate	Votes	%
Republican	Kevin Brady (incumbent)	207,128	72.56
Democratic	Kent Hargett	70,758	24.79
Libertarian	Brian Stevens	7,565	2.65
Total votes		285,451	100
Republican hold			

== District 9 ==
2008 Texas's 9th congressional district election
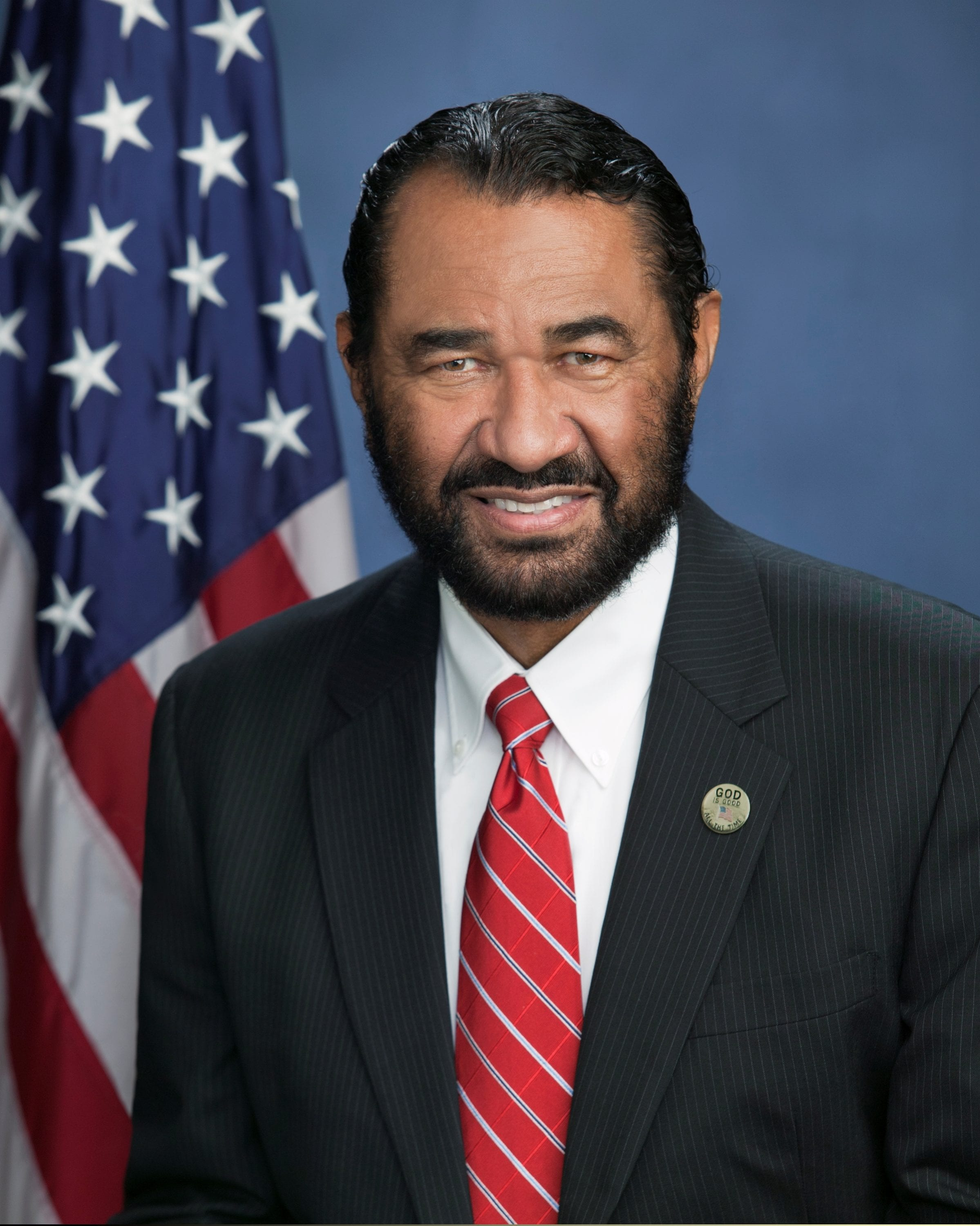

Nominee	Al Green	Brad Walters
Party	Democratic	Libertarian
Popular vote	143,868	9,760
Percentage	93.7%	6.3%
- County results Green: 90–100%
U.S. Representative before election
Al Green
Democratic
Elected U.S. Representative
Al Green
Democratic

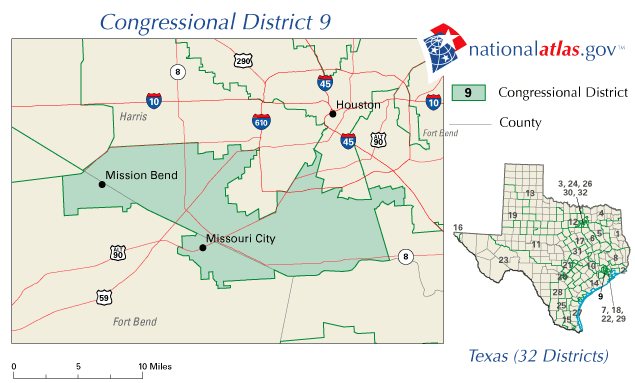

Sophomore Democrat Al Green was not expected to face a serious challenge in 2008 for his heavily Democratic district, which is situated in southwest Houston and includes Houston's Southside, as well as the Mission Bend and Alief areas (which have large Asian-American populations) and several heavily black and Hispanic northeastern neighborhoods of Missouri City. He was elected by a 3 to 1 margin in 2004 after defeating displaced incumbent Congressman and fellow Democrat Chris Bell in the primary (Bell was moved out of his previous district in the controversial 2003 redistricting engineered by then-House Majority Leader Tom DeLay), and won a second term unopposed in 2006. Green was renominated, while no Republicans ran in the 2008 primary.

=== Predictions ===
Source	Ranking	As of
The Cook Political Report	Safe D	November 6, 2008
Rothenberg	Safe D	November 2, 2008
Sabato's Crystal Ball	Safe D	November 6, 2008
Real Clear Politics	Safe D	November 7, 2008
CQ Politics	Safe D	November 6, 2008

Texas's 9th congressional district, 2008
Party	Candidate	Votes	%
Democratic	Al Green (incumbent)	143,868	93.65
Libertarian	Brad Walters	9,760	6.35
Total votes		153,628	100
Democratic hold			

== District 10 ==
2008 Texas's 10th congressional district election
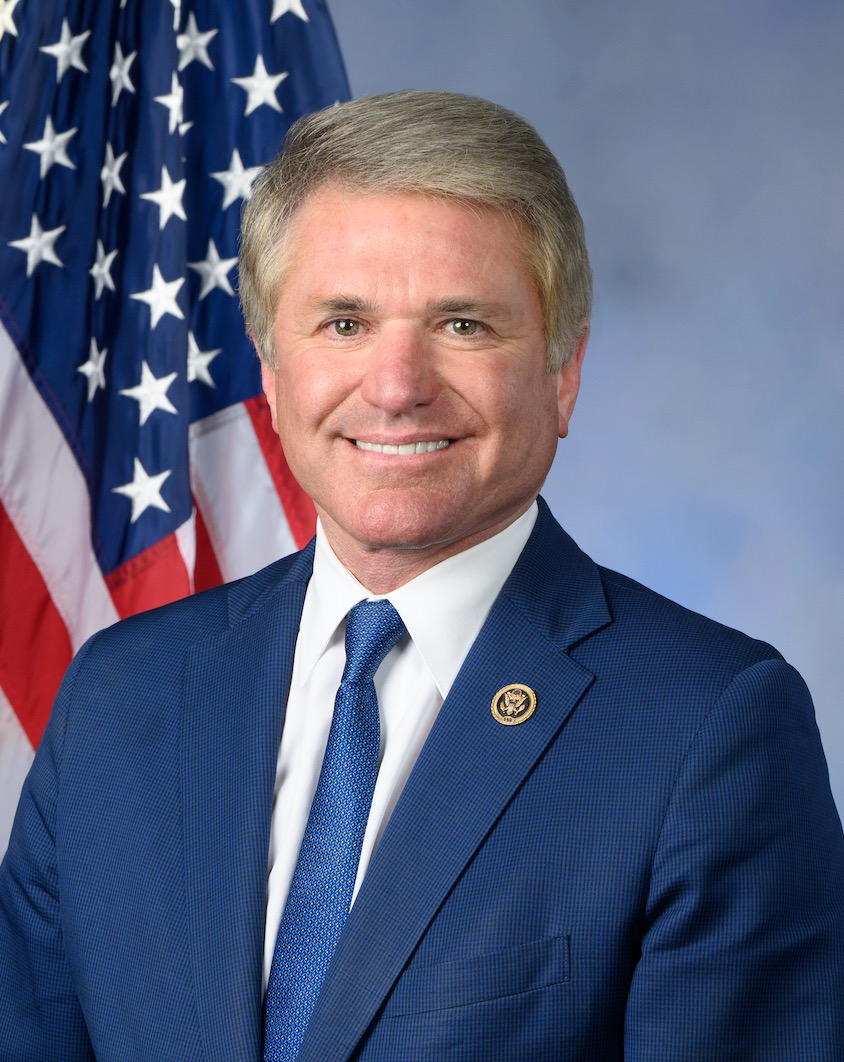

Nominee	Michael McCaul	Larry Joe Doherty
Party	Republican	Democratic
Popular vote	179,493	143,719
Percentage	53.9%	43.1%
- County results Mccaul: 50–60% 60–70% 70–80% Doherty: 50–60% 60–70%
U.S. Representative before election
Michael McCaul
Republican
Elected U.S. Representative
Michael McCaul
Republican

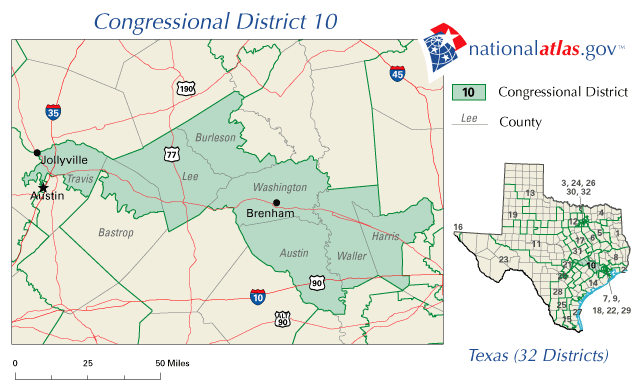

Incumbent Republican nominee Michael McCaul of Austin was challenged by Democratic nominee Larry Joe Doherty, a legal ethics attorney and former TV courtroom judge, who had defeated Dan Grant in the primary. CQ Politics considered this race 'Republican Favored'. In 2006, McCaul won only 55% of the vote against Democratic challenger, Ted Ankrum, and Libertarian Michael Badnarik.

This Republican-leaning district stretches from north Austin into Brenham traveling all the way to several far western and northwestern suburbs of Houston.

=== Predictions ===
Source	Ranking	As of
The Cook Political Report	Lean R	November 6, 2008
Rothenberg	Likely R	November 2, 2008
Sabato's Crystal Ball	Lean R	November 6, 2008
Real Clear Politics	Safe R	November 7, 2008
CQ Politics	Lean R	November 6, 2008

Texas's 10th congressional district, 2008
Party	Candidate	Votes	%
Republican	Michael McCaul (incumbent)	179,493	53.89
Democratic	Larry Joe Doherty	143,719	43.15
Libertarian	Matt Finkel	9,871	2.96
Total votes		333,083	100
Republican hold			

== District 11 ==
2008 Texas's 11th congressional district election
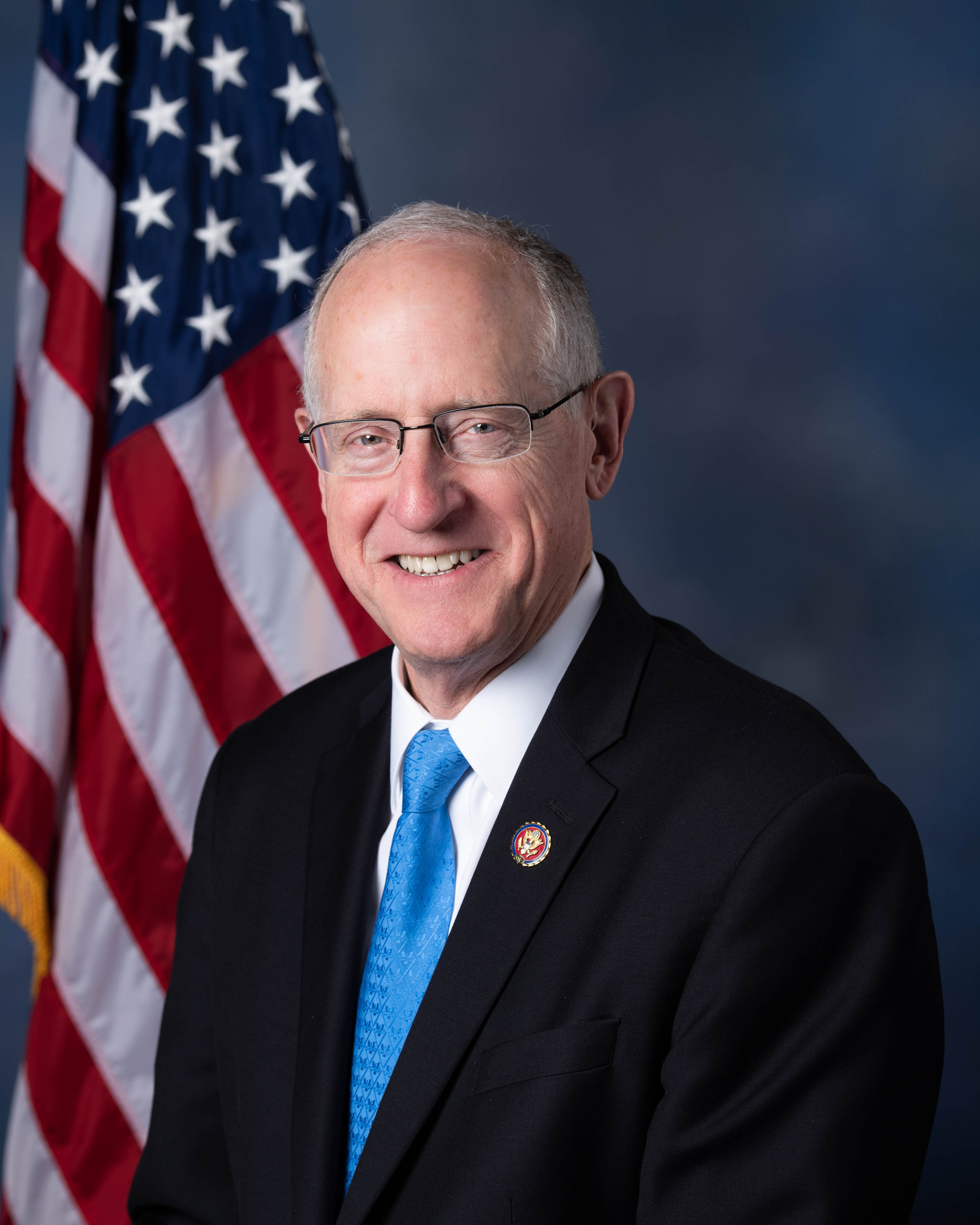

Nominee	Mike Conaway	John Strohm
Party	Republican	Libertarian
Popular vote	189,625	25,051
Percentage	88.3%	11.7%
- County results Conaway: 80–90% 90–100%
U.S. Representative before election
Mike Conaway
Republican
Elected U.S. Representative
Mike Conaway
Republican

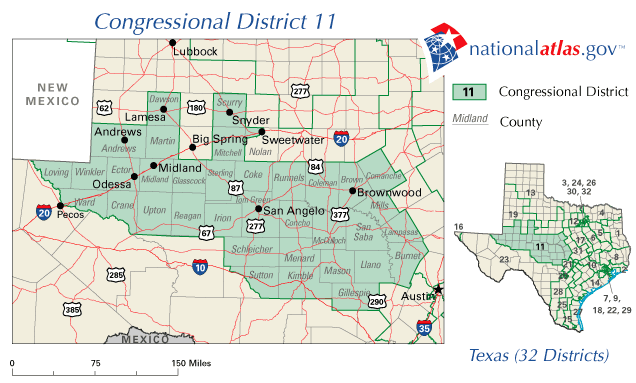

Midland Republican Mike Conaway represented George W. Bush's strongest district in the 2004 election. He won 77% of the vote in 2004 and was one of only a handful of Republicans who ran unopposed in 2006. Conaway's district stretches from the Midland and San Angelo areas to several mostly rural areas northwest of Austin. No Democrat ran in the 2008 primary.

=== Predictions ===
Source	Ranking	As of
The Cook Political Report	Safe R	November 6, 2008
Rothenberg	Safe R	November 2, 2008
Sabato's Crystal Ball	Safe R	November 6, 2008
Real Clear Politics	Safe R	November 7, 2008
CQ Politics	Safe R	November 6, 2008

Texas's 11th congressional district, 2008
Party	Candidate	Votes	%
Republican	Mike Conaway (incumbent)	189,625	88.33
Libertarian	John Strohm	25,051	11.67
Total votes		214,676	100
Republican hold			

== District 12 ==
2008 Texas's 12th congressional district election
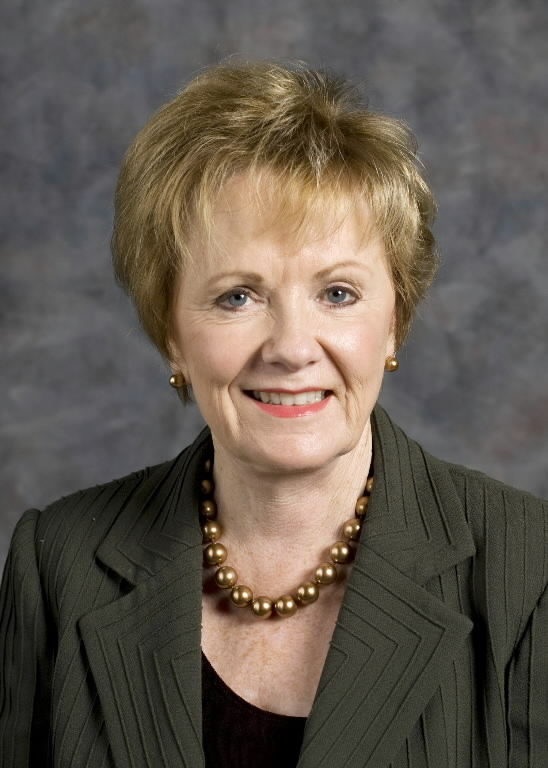

Nominee	Kay Granger	Tracey Smith
Party	Republican	Democratic
Popular vote	181,662	82,250
Percentage	67.6%	30.6%
- County results Granger: 60–70% 70–80%
U.S. Representative before election
Kay Granger
Republican
Elected U.S. Representative
Kay Granger
Republican

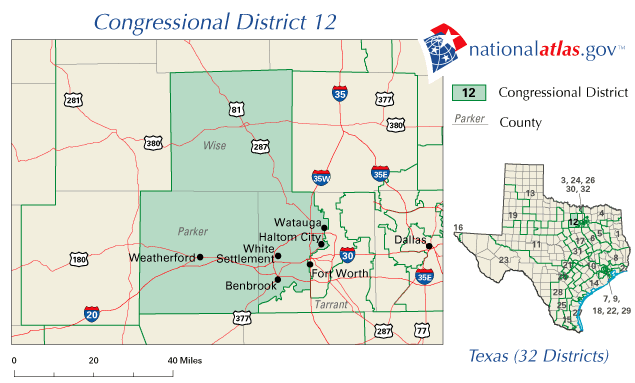

Republican Kay Granger, who is considered a moderate by Texas Republican standards, won two thirds of the vote in 2006, outperforming most of her fellow Texas Republican colleagues. The popular Fort Worth-based Granger was expected to win re-election in 2008 in this district comprising western areas of Fort Worth and surrounding areas.

=== Predictions ===
Source	Ranking	As of
The Cook Political Report	Safe R	November 6, 2008
Rothenberg	Safe R	November 2, 2008
Sabato's Crystal Ball	Safe R	November 6, 2008
Real Clear Politics	Safe R	November 7, 2008
CQ Politics	Safe R	November 6, 2008

Texas's 12th congressional district, 2008
Party	Candidate	Votes	%
Republican	Kay Granger (incumbent)	181,662	67.59
Democratic	Tracey Smith	82,250	30.60
Libertarian	Shiloh Sidney Shambaugh	4,842	1.80
Total votes		268,754	100
Republican hold			

== District 13 ==
2008 Texas's 13th congressional district election
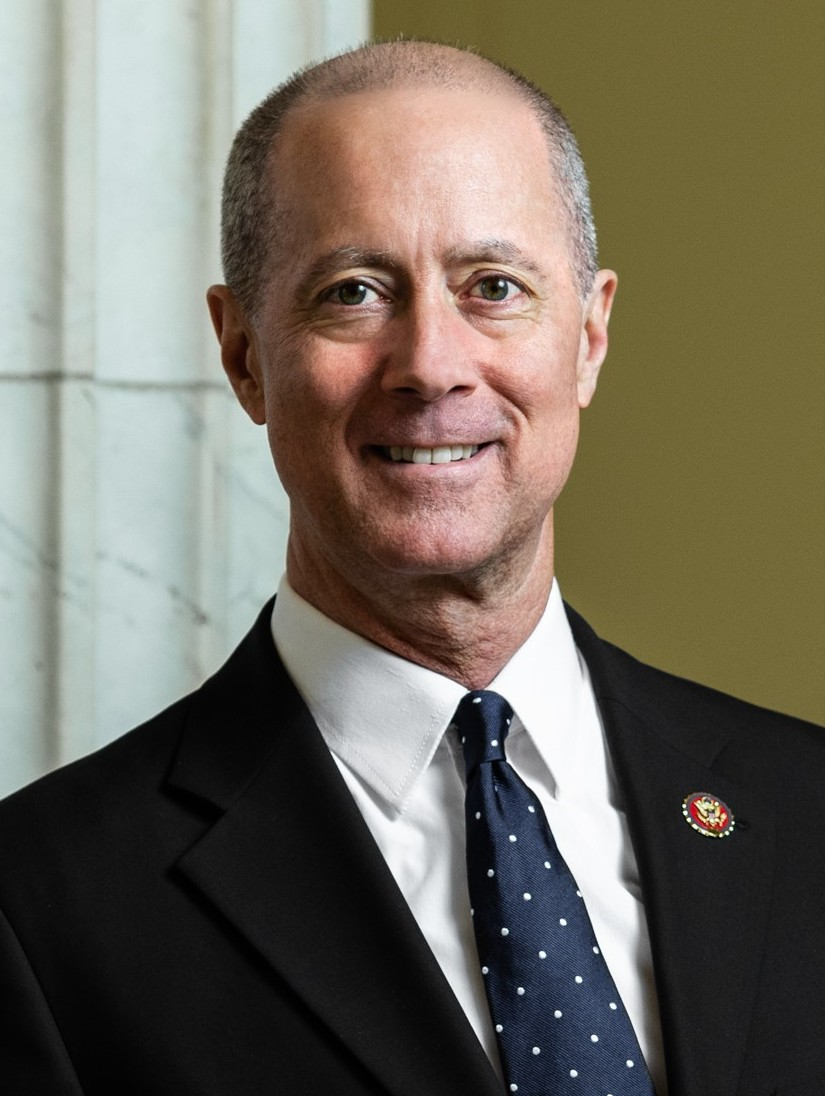

Nominee	Mac Thornberry	Roger James Waun
Party	Republican	Democratic
Popular vote	180,078	51,847
Percentage	77.7%	22.4%
- County results Thornberry: 50–60% 60–70% 70–80% 80–90% 90–100%
U.S. Representative before election
Mac Thornberry
Republican
Elected U.S. Representative
Mac Thornberry
Republican

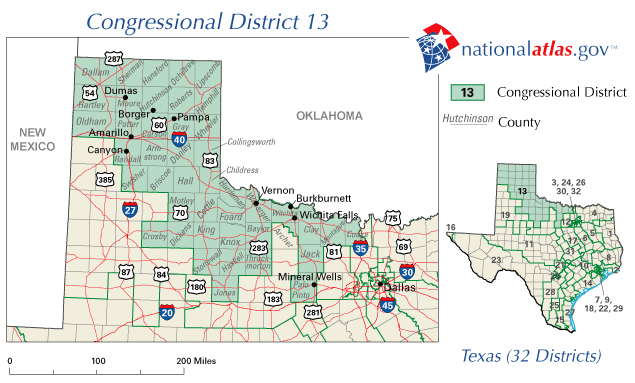

Mac Thornberry represents this Texas Panhandle district that encompasses Amarillo and Wichita Falls. The Clarendon Republican won by a 3 to 1 margin in 2006 and faced only a Libertarian candidate in 2004.

=== Predictions ===
Source	Ranking	As of
The Cook Political Report	Safe R	November 6, 2008
Rothenberg	Safe R	November 2, 2008
Sabato's Crystal Ball	Safe R	November 6, 2008
Real Clear Politics	Safe R	November 7, 2008
CQ Politics	Safe R	November 6, 2008

Texas's 13th congressional district, 2008
Party	Candidate	Votes	%
Republican	Mac Thornberry (incumbent)	180,078	77.65
Democratic	Roger James Waun	51,847	22.35
Total votes		231,919	100
Republican hold			

== District 14 ==
2008 Texas's 14th congressional district election
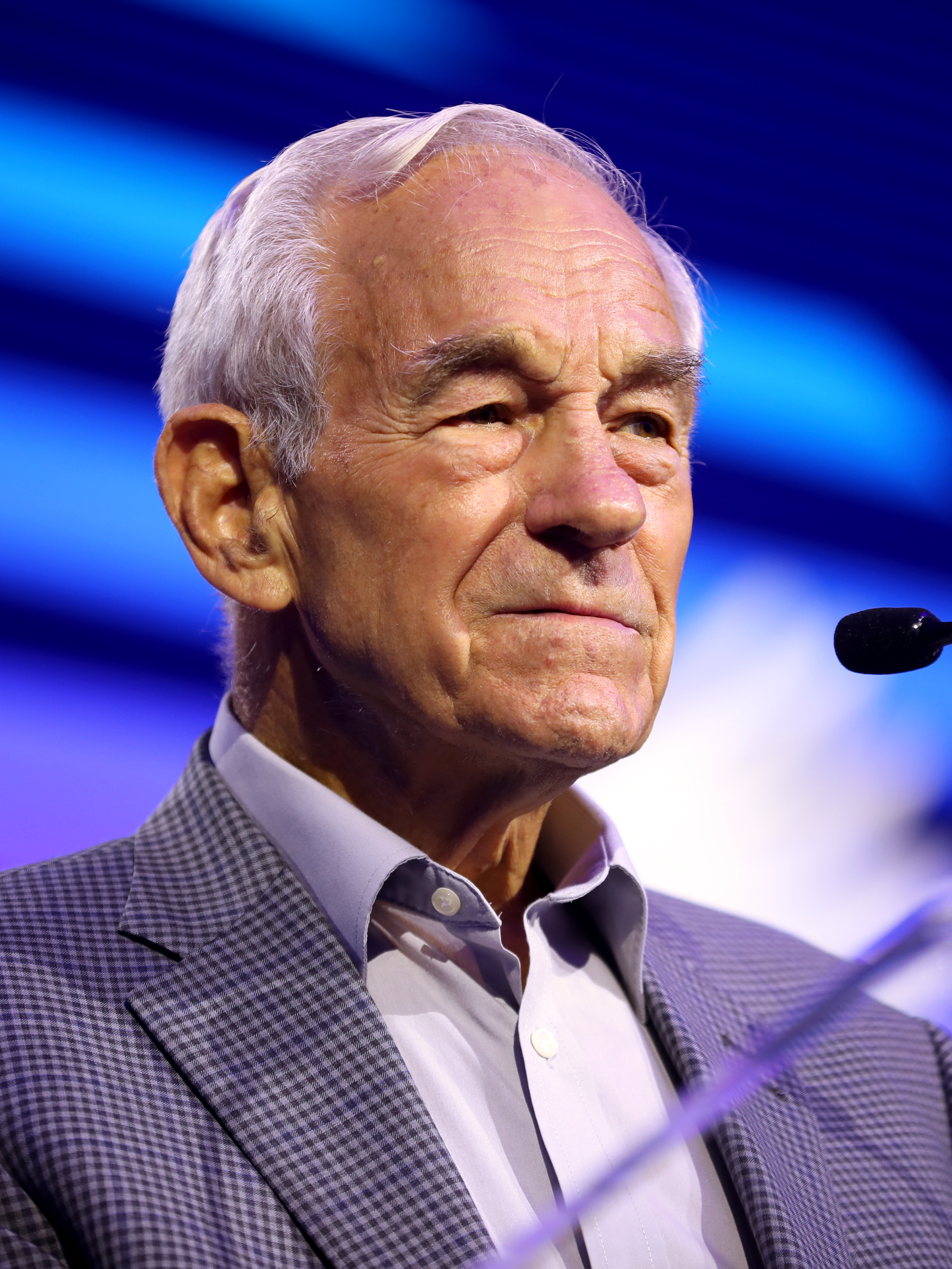
Nominee	Ron Paul
Party	Republican
Popular vote	191,293
Percentage	100.0%
U.S. Representative before election
Ron Paul
Republican
Elected U.S. Representative
Ron Paul
Republican

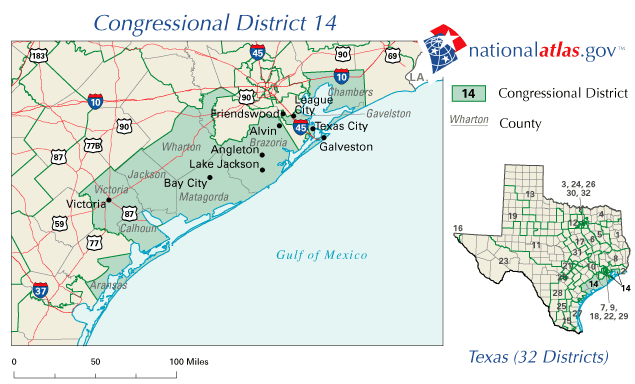

Republican Ron Paul is best known for his strong libertarian views. His slogan, "The Taxpayers' Best Friend", emphasizes his strong — and sometimes controversial — takes on fiscal conservatism, while his social policies, which includes ending the federal war on drugs and legalizing marijuana, as well as his belief that the federal government should not be involved in wedge issues such as gay marriage, leading to a more negative nickname, "Dr. No", for his votes against much of the legislative agenda of both parties in Congress.

The 73-year-old physician is a resident of Surfside. Paul was a Republican candidate in the 2008 presidential election (his second, following his run as Libertarian Party nominee in 1988), and ran un-opposed for re-election.

In 2006, Ron Paul won 60% of the vote against Democratic opponent Shane Sklar, a young rancher and executive director of the Independent Cattlemen's Association of Texas (ICA) who ran on a promise to serve as a fiscally conservative Blue Dog Democrat and received a slightly more favorable rating from the NRA Political Victory Fund, in an attempt to defeat the popular Paul. In 2008, Paul was renominated, while no Democrats ran in the primary. The district extends from several far southern and southeastern areas of Houston, including Galveston and Brazoria County, to the Bay City, Wharton County, and Victoria areas.

=== Predictions ===
Source	Ranking	As of
The Cook Political Report	Safe R	November 6, 2008
Rothenberg	Safe R	November 2, 2008
Sabato's Crystal Ball	Safe R	November 6, 2008
Real Clear Politics	Safe R	November 7, 2008
CQ Politics	Safe R	November 6, 2008

Texas's 14th congressional district, 2008
Party	Candidate	Votes	%
Republican	Ron Paul (incumbent)	191,293	100.00
Total votes		191,293	100
Republican hold			

== District 15 ==
2008 Texas's 15th congressional district election
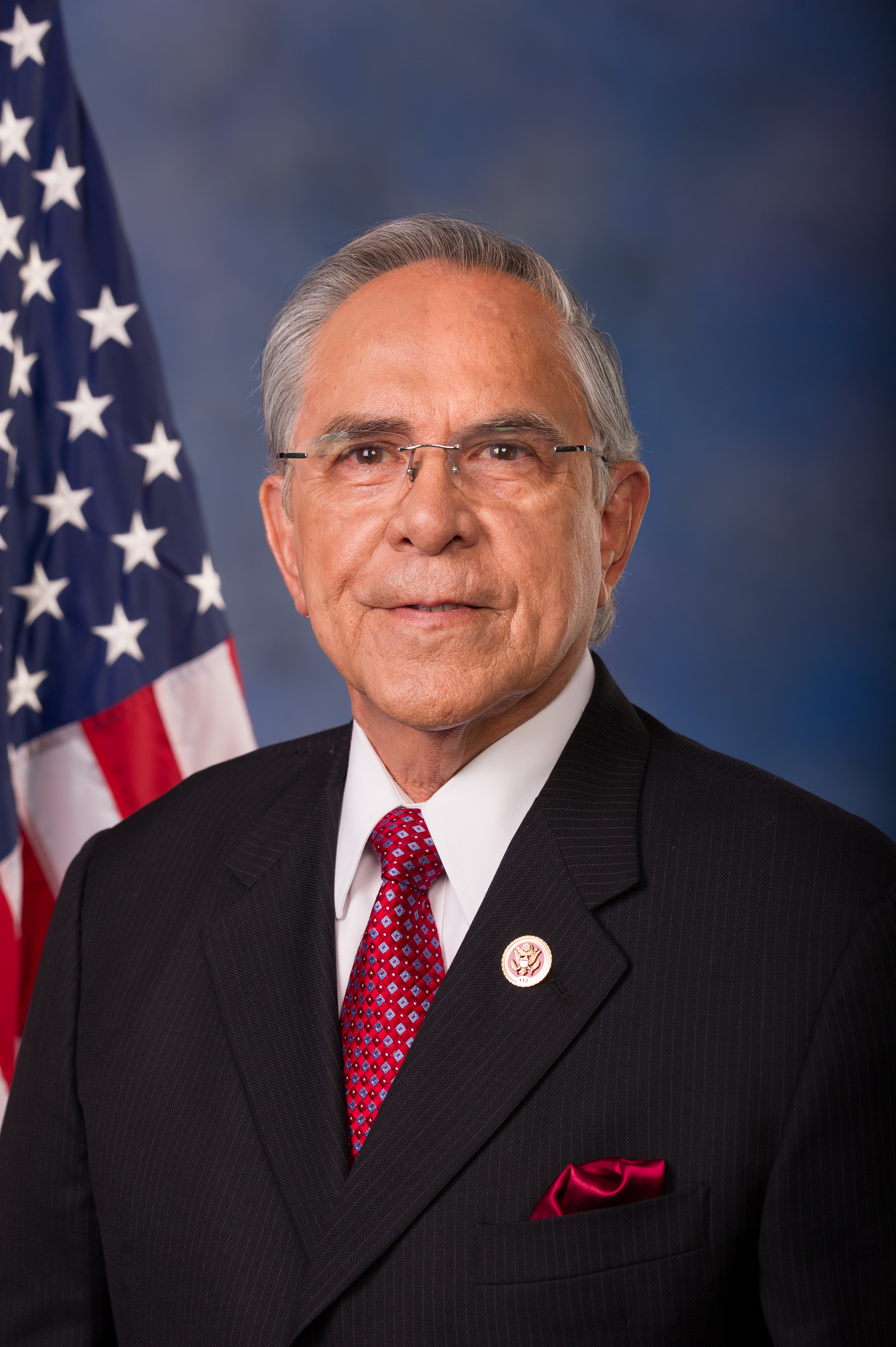

Nominee	Ruben Hinojosa	Eddie Zamora
Party	Democratic	Republican
Popular vote	107,578	52,303
Percentage	65.7%	31.9%
- County results Hinojosa: 50–60% 60–70% 70–80% 80–90% Zamora: 40–50% 50–60% 60–70%
U.S. Representative before election
Ruben Hinojosa
Democratic
Elected U.S. Representative
Ruben Hinojosa
Democratic

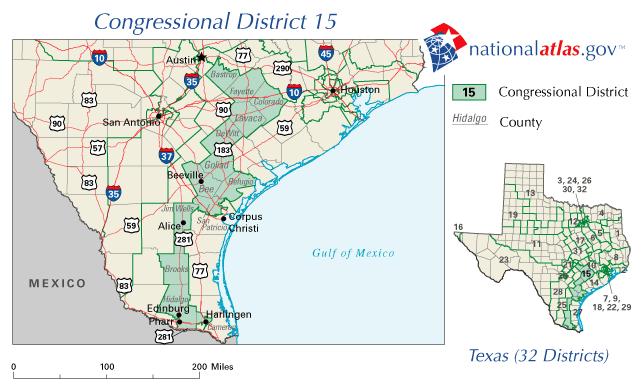

Democrat Rubén Hinojosa of Mercedes won 62% of the vote in 2004 in a South Texas district that had to be realigned following a Supreme Court decision that made the neighboring 23rd District unconstitutional. Hinojosa, who was 68 in 2008, won the Democratic nomination.

=== Predictions ===
Source	Ranking	As of
The Cook Political Report	Safe D	November 6, 2008
Rothenberg	Safe D	November 2, 2008
Sabato's Crystal Ball	Safe D	November 6, 2008
Real Clear Politics	Safe D	November 7, 2008
CQ Politics	Safe D	November 6, 2008

Texas's 15th congressional district, 2008
Party	Candidate	Votes	%
Democratic	Ruben Hinojosa (Incumbent)	107,578	65.71
Republican	Eddie Zamora	52,303	31.95
Libertarian	Gricha Raether	3,827	2.634
Total votes		163,708	100
Democratic hold			

== District 16 ==
2008 Texas's 16th congressional district election
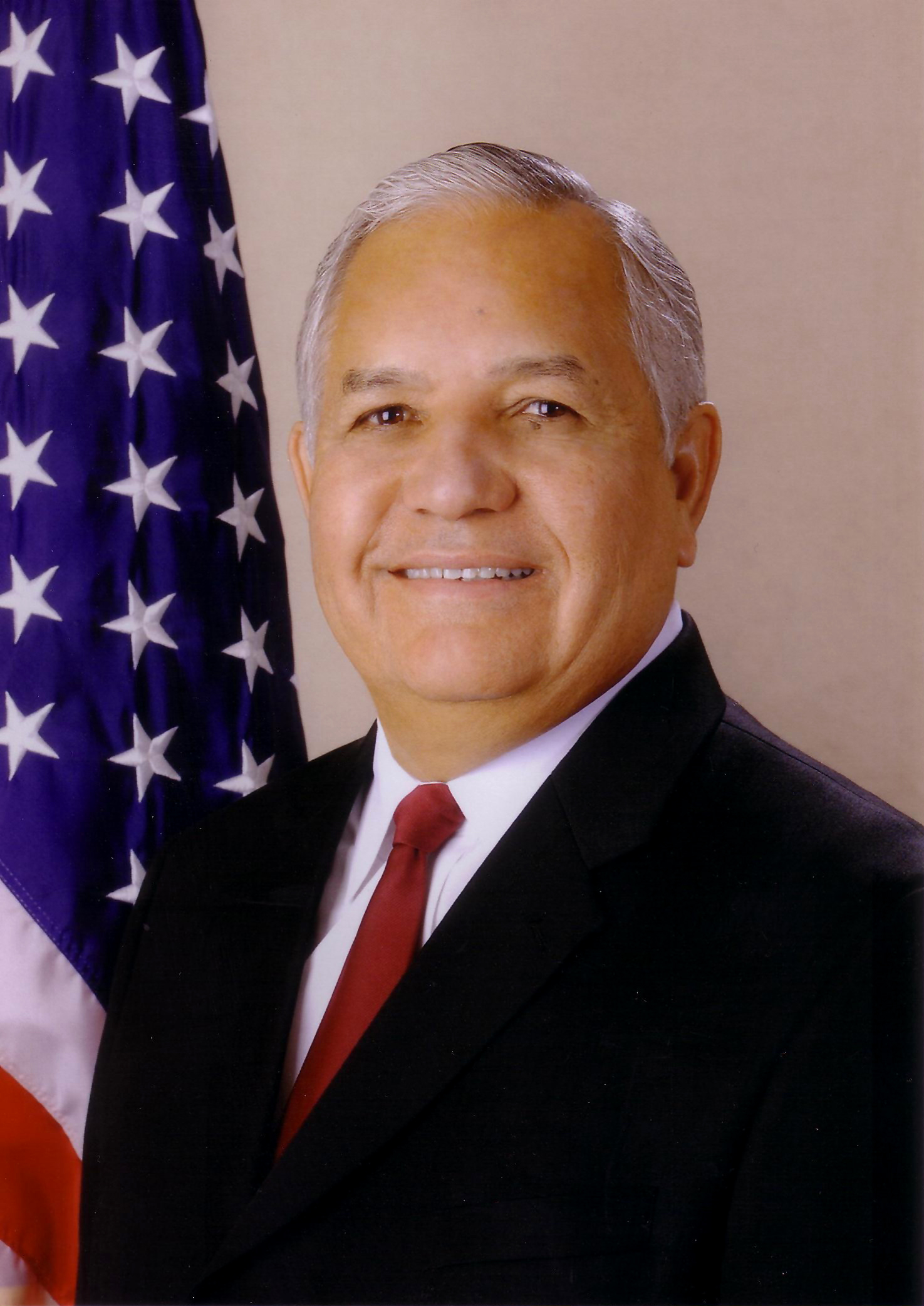

Nominee	Silvestre Reyes	Benjamin Mendoza	Mette Baker
Party	Democratic	Independent	Libertarian
Popular vote	130,375	16,348	12,000
Percentage	82.1%	10.3%	7.6%
- County results Reyes: 80–90%
U.S. Representative before election
Silvestre Reyes
Democratic
Elected U.S. Representative
Silvestre Reyes
Democratic

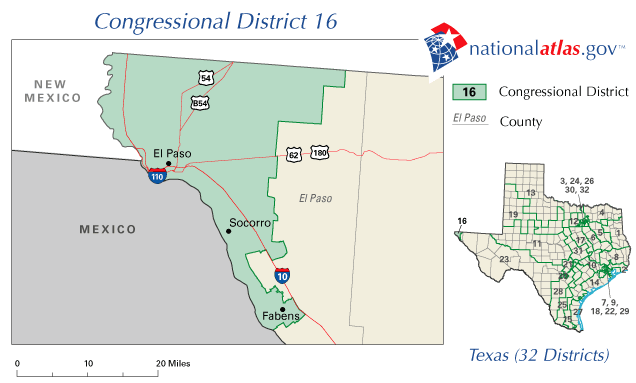

Democrat Silvestre Reyes represents El Paso and is the Chairman of the Permanent Select Committee on Intelligence, which could make him a target of some conservative Republicans over issues relating to immigration in spite of the fact that Reyes was a former border patrol agent. Still, the district remains overwhelmingly Democratic due to its large Hispanic population, and Reyes is popular with his constituents. He won two thirds of the 2004 vote in a district that swung strongly in favor of John Kerry, and won with no Republican challenger in 2006. Reyes was renominated, while no Republican ran in the 2008 primary.

=== Predictions ===
Source	Ranking	As of
The Cook Political Report	Safe D	November 6, 2008
Rothenberg	Safe D	November 2, 2008
Sabato's Crystal Ball	Safe D	November 6, 2008
Real Clear Politics	Safe D	November 7, 2008
CQ Politics	Safe D	November 6, 2008

Texas's 16th congressional district, 2008
Party	Candidate	Votes	%
Democratic	Silvestre Reyes (Incumbent)	130,375	82.14
Independent	Benjamin Mendoza	16,348	10.30
Libertarian	Mette Baker	12,000	7.56
Total votes		158,723	100
Democratic hold			

== District 17 ==
2008 Texas's 17th congressional district election
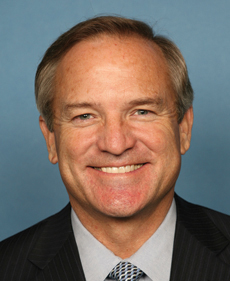

Nominee	Chet Edwards	Rob Curnock
Party	Democratic	Republican
Popular vote	134,592	115,581
Percentage	53.0%	45.5%
- County results Edwards: 50–60% 60–70% Curnock: 40–50% 50–60% 60–70%
U.S. Representative before election
Chet Edwards
Democratic
Elected U.S. Representative
Chet Edwards
Democratic

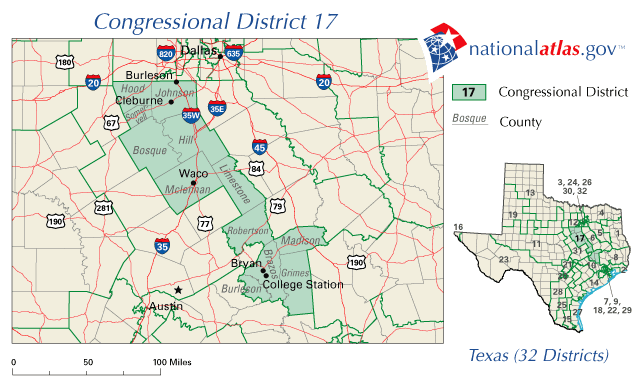

Incumbent Democrat Chet Edwards had been targeted for defeat in many recent elections. His district was widely seen as arguably the most heavily Republican district held by a Democrat, and won a close election in 2004, but recovered in 2006 with a strong eighteen point win. The district, which includes the official residence of George W. Bush, stretched from several rural areas south of Fort Worth to Edwards' hometown of Waco and the Brazos Valley region, which comprises the Bryan–College Station area. This district gave George W. Bush 70% of the vote in 2004. Edwards won the 2008 Democratic nomination.

=== Predictions ===
Source	Ranking	As of
The Cook Political Report	Safe D	November 6, 2008
Rothenberg	Safe D	November 2, 2008
Sabato's Crystal Ball	Safe D	November 6, 2008
Real Clear Politics	Safe D	November 7, 2008
CQ Politics	Safe D	November 6, 2008

Texas's 17th congressional district, 2008
Party	Candidate	Votes	%
Democratic	Chet Edwards (Incumbent)	134,592	52.98
Republican	Rob Curnock	115,581	45.50
Libertarian	Gardner Osborne	3,849	1.52
Total votes		254,022	100
Democratic hold			

== District 18 ==
2008 Texas's 18th congressional district election
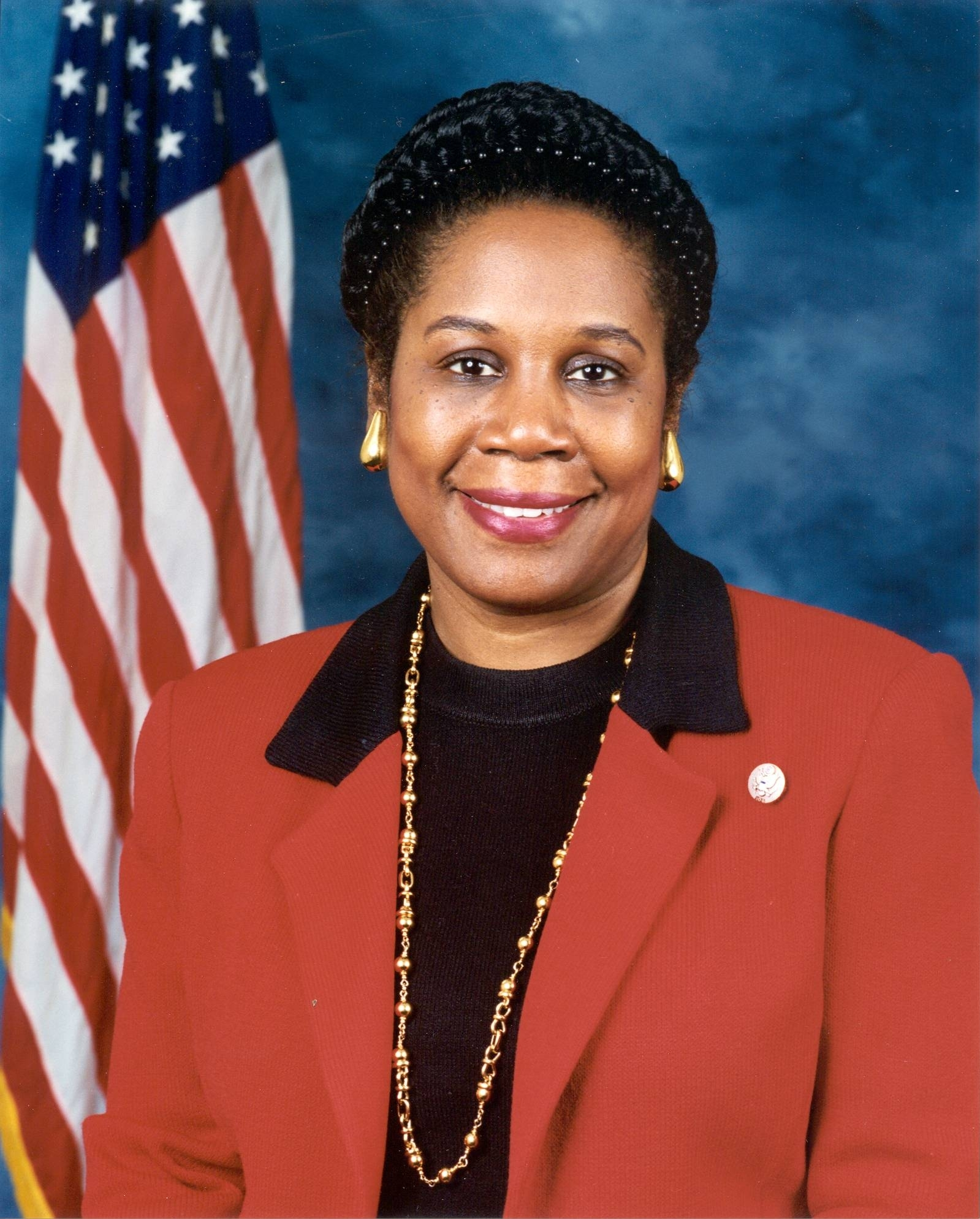

Nominee	Sheila Jackson Lee	John Faulk
Party	Democratic	Republican
Popular vote	148,617	39,095
Percentage	77.3%	20.3%
- County results Lee: 70–80%
U.S. Representative before election
Sheila Jackson Lee
Democratic
Elected U.S. Representative
Sheila Jackson Lee
Democratic

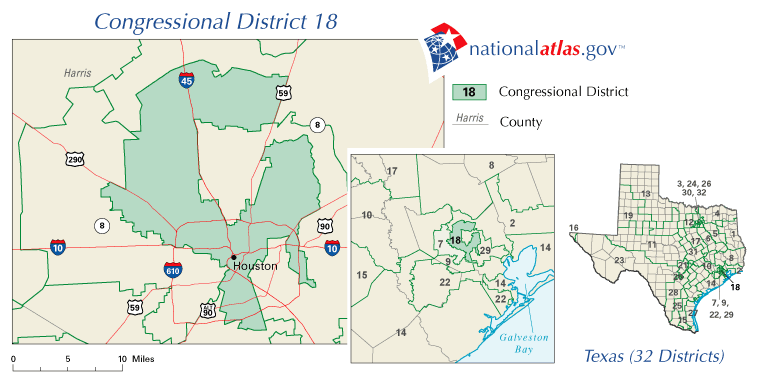

Democrat Sheila Jackson Lee represented one of the most heavily Democratic areas in the state, covering several largely poor and African-American areas of Houston (including downtown Houston) and whose three previous representatives (Barbara Jordan, Mickey Leland, and Craig Washington) were all African-Americans and took staunch liberal stances.

Jackson Lee won the Democratic nomination.

=== Predictions ===
Source	Ranking	As of
The Cook Political Report	Safe D	November 6, 2008
Rothenberg	Safe D	November 2, 2008
Sabato's Crystal Ball	Safe D	November 6, 2008
Real Clear Politics	Safe D	November 7, 2008
CQ Politics	Safe D	November 6, 2008

Texas's 18th congressional district, 2008
Party	Candidate	Votes	%
Democratic	Sheila Jackson Lee (Incumbent)	148,617	77.32
Republican	John Faulk	39,095	20.34
Libertarian	Mike Taylor	4,486	2.33
Total votes		192,198	100
Democratic hold			

== District 19 ==
2008 Texas's 19th congressional district election
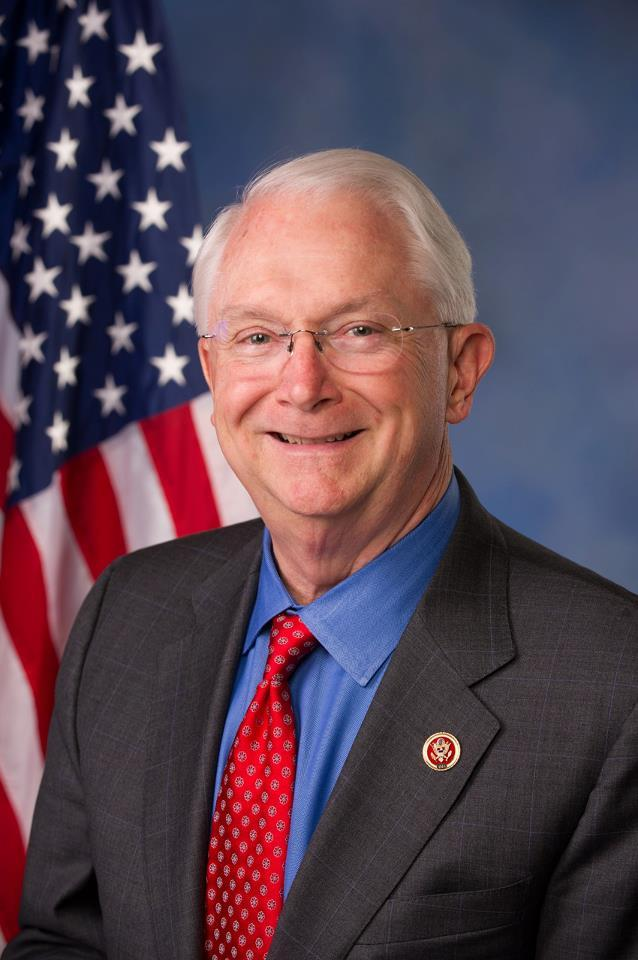

Nominee	Randy Neugebauer	Dwight Fullingim
Party	Republican	Democratic
Popular vote	168,501	58,030
Percentage	72.4%	24.9%
- County results Neugebauer: 50–60% 60–70% 70–80% 80–90%
U.S. Representative before election
Randy Neugebauer
Republican
Elected U.S. Representative
Randy Neugebauer
Republican

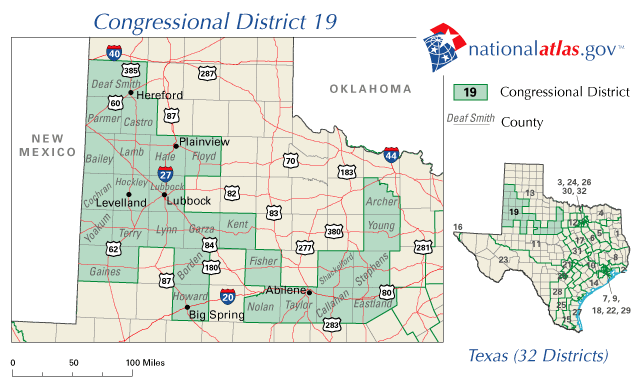

Republican Randy Neugebauer of Lubbock won re-election in 2006 with 68% of the vote. His district is heavily Republican and stretches from Lubbock to Big Spring and Abilene and was created in the controversial 2003 Texas redistricting, which in 2004 led to the defeat of Neugebauer's challenger, conservative Democrat Charles Stenholm.

=== Predictions ===
Source	Ranking	As of
The Cook Political Report	Safe R	November 6, 2008
Rothenberg	Safe R	November 2, 2008
Sabato's Crystal Ball	Safe R	November 6, 2008
Real Clear Politics	Safe R	November 7, 2008
CQ Politics	Safe R	November 6, 2008

Texas's 19th congressional district, 2008
Party	Candidate	Votes	%
Republican	Randy Neugebauer (incumbent)	168,501	72.44
Democratic	Dwight Fullingim	58,030	24.95
Libertarian	Richard Peterson	6,080	2.61
Total votes		232,611	100
Republican hold			

== District 20 ==
2008 Texas's 20th congressional district election
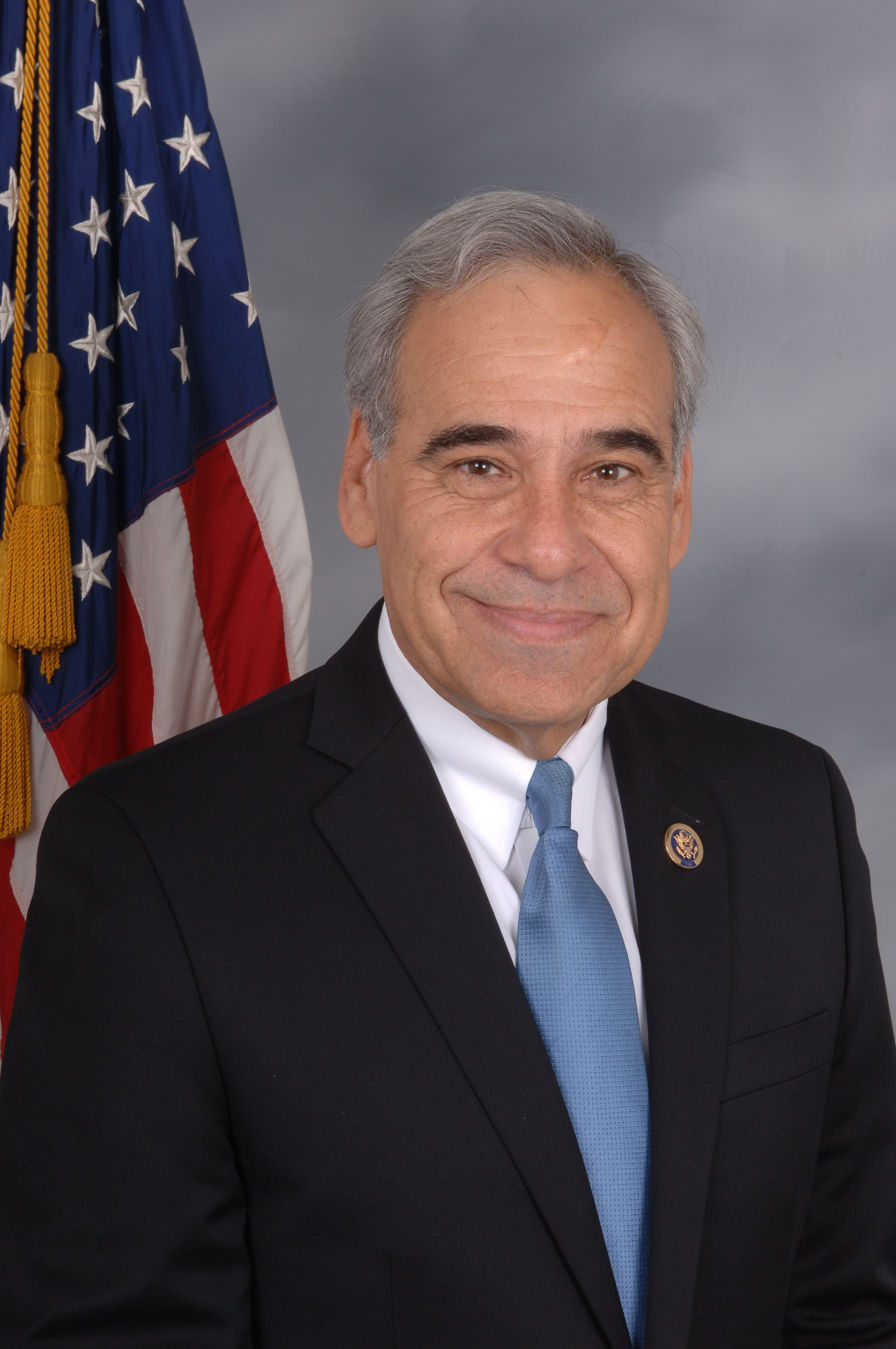

Nominee	Charles A. Gonzalez	Robert Litoff
Party	Democratic	Republican
Popular vote	127,298	44,585
Percentage	71.9%	25.2%
- County results Gonzalez: 70–80%
U.S. Representative before election
Charles A. Gonzalez
Democratic
Elected U.S. Representative
Charles A. Gonzalez
Democratic

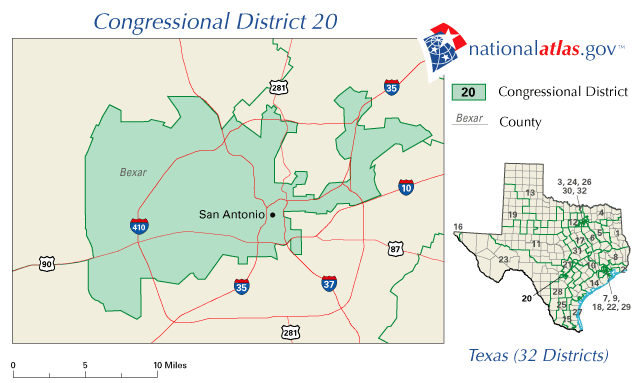

Democrat Charlie Gonzalez represents much of heavily Democratic, largely Hispanic inner San Antonio, including the downtown area. Gonzalez won 87% of the vote in 2006 against a Libertarian opponent and two thirds of the 2004 vote. Gonzalez was heavily favored to win re-election to this seat, which was once held by his father, Henry Gonzalez for nearly four decades. The Gonzalez family had represented this district for 47 years as of 2008.

=== Predictions ===
Source	Ranking	As of
The Cook Political Report	Safe D	November 6, 2008
Rothenberg	Safe D	November 2, 2008
Sabato's Crystal Ball	Safe D	November 6, 2008
Real Clear Politics	Safe D	November 7, 2008
CQ Politics	Safe D	November 6, 2008

Texas's 20th congressional district, 2008
Party	Candidate	Votes	%
Democratic	Charles A. Gonzalez (Incumbent)	127,298	71.90
Republican	Robert Litoff	44,585	25.18
Libertarian	Michael Idrogo	5,172	2.92
Total votes		177,055	100
Democratic hold			

== District 21 ==
2008 Texas's 21st congressional district election
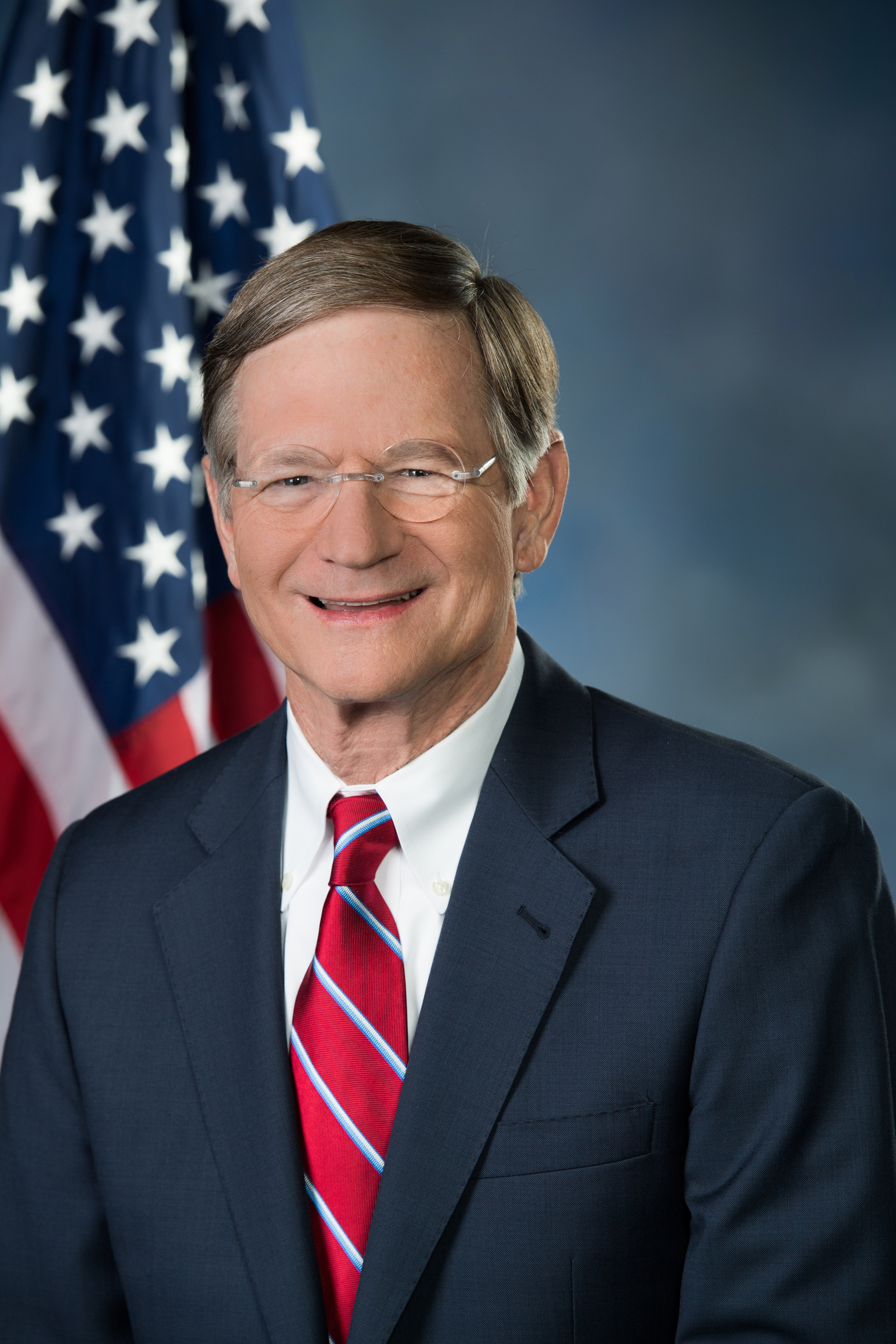

Nominee	Lamar Smith	James Arthur Strohm
Party	Republican	Libertarian
Popular vote	243,471	60,879
Percentage	80.0%	20.0%
- County results Smith: 70–80% 80–90%
U.S. Representative before election
Lamar Smith
Republican
Elected U.S. Representative
Lamar Smith
Republican

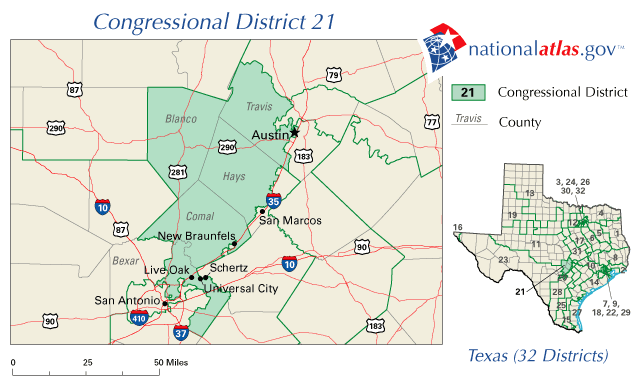

Longtime representative Lamar S. Smith was the only Republican to win among the five congressional districts realigned as a result of a Supreme Court ruling that declared the nearby 23rd District unconstitutional as a result of allegations of diluted Hispanic voting power during the controversial 2003 Texas redistricting. Smith ended up being moved into a district that now encompasses several northern San Antonio suburbs as well as the Texas Hill Country and western parts of Travis County. The district includes a heavily Democratic portion of Austin, including the area around the University of Texas at Austin. However, it is no match for the heavily Republican areas around San Antonio. The Supreme Court decision restored a large amount of territory that had been shifted to Henry Bonilla's district in 2003. Smith won 60% of the vote in 2006 against six challengers, including two Democrats, in a special election that resulted from the ruling. Smith was renominated, while no Democrats ran in the 2008 primary.

=== Predictions ===
Source	Ranking	As of
The Cook Political Report	Safe R	November 6, 2008
Rothenberg	Safe R	November 2, 2008
Sabato's Crystal Ball	Safe R	November 6, 2008
Real Clear Politics	Safe R	November 7, 2008
CQ Politics	Safe R	November 6, 2008

Texas's 21st congressional district, 2008
Party	Candidate	Votes	%
Republican	Lamar Smith (incumbent)	243,471	80.00
Libertarian	James Arthur Strohm	60,879	20.00
Total votes		304,350	100
Republican hold			

== District 22 ==
2008 Texas's 22nd congressional district election
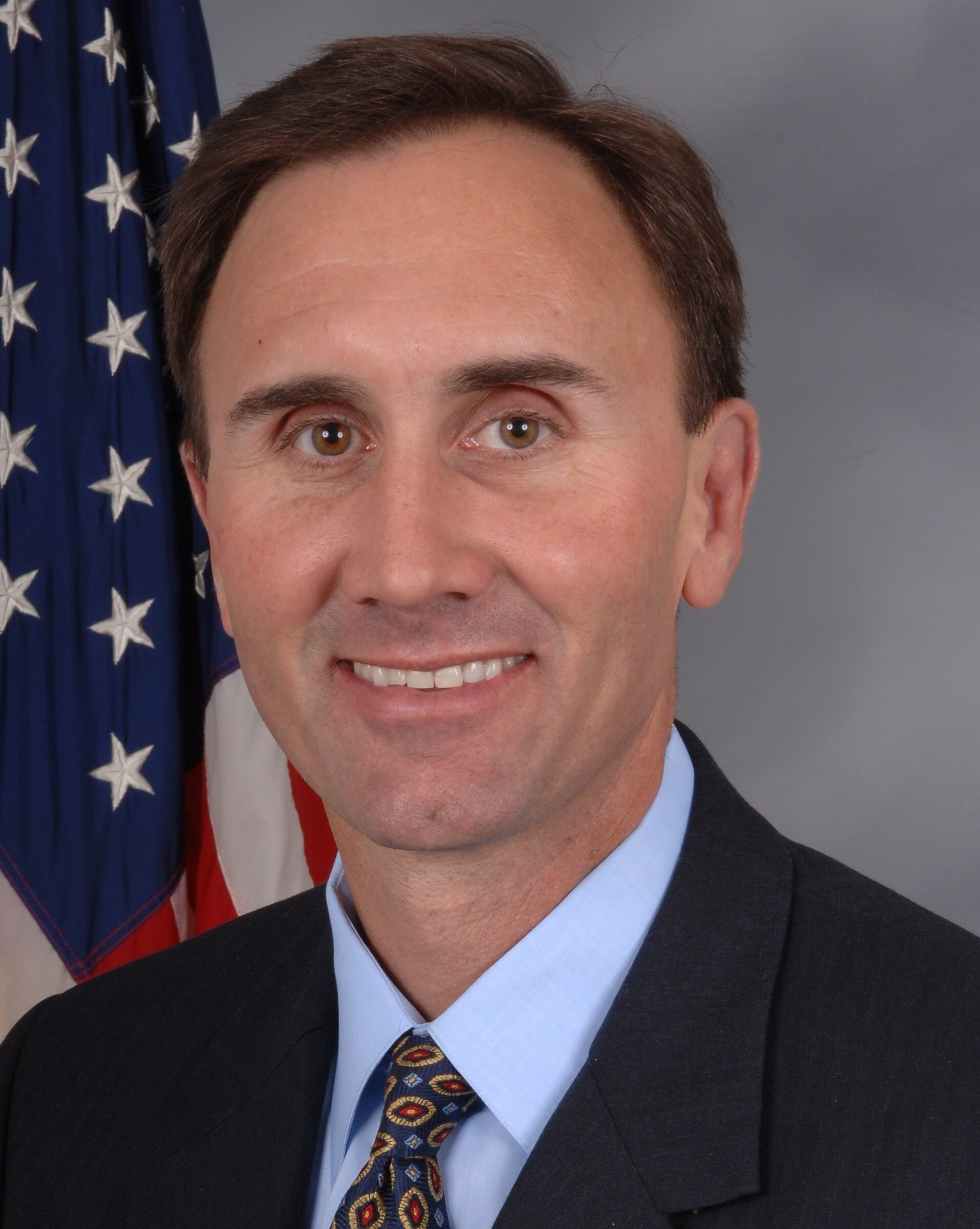

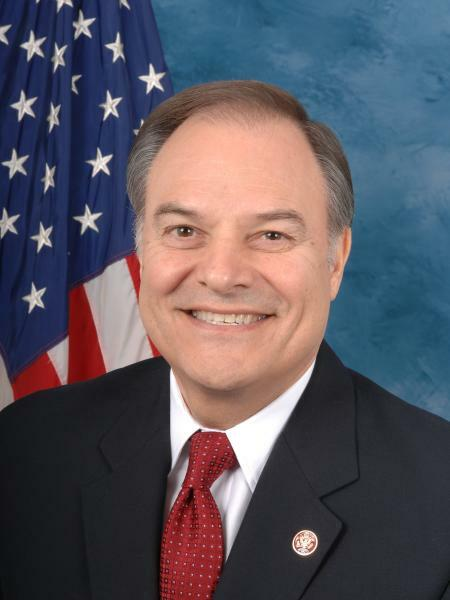
Nominee	Pete Olson	Nick Lampson
Party	Republican	Democratic
Popular vote	161,996	140,160
Percentage	52.4%	45.4%
- County results Olson: 50–60% Lampson: 50–60%
U.S. Representative before election
Nick Lampson
Democratic
Elected U.S. Representative
Pete Olson
Republican

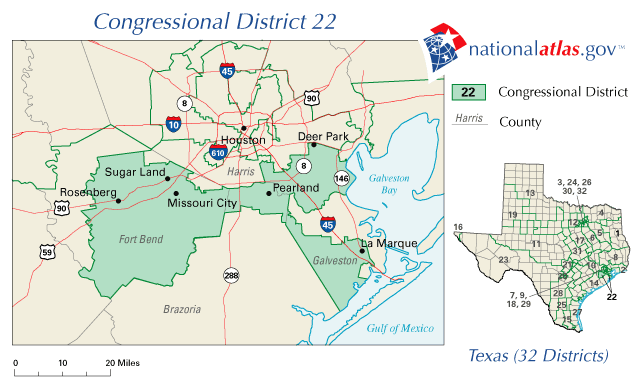

The 2008 election for Texas's 22nd congressional district was held on November 4, 2008, as part of the United States House of Representatives elections for the 111th United States Congress. Pete Olson defeated the incumbent Nick Lampson.

This race was considered a key race because the seat was previously held by former House Majority Leader Tom DeLay, as well as the fact that the seat was represented by a Democrat, Nick Lampson, whose victory was largely attributed to Republicans being forced to run a write-in campaign. The Republican candidate was Pete Olson who faced the incumbent, Lampson.

Olson clearly led the race in the weeks leading up to election day. On October 22, 2008, poll by John Zogby and the Houston Chronicle stated that Olson had a 17-point lead over Lampson. On October 30, 2008, Larry Sabato predicted in his Crystal Ball newsletter that Olson's congressional race to be a "Republican Pick Up."

=== Predictions ===
Source	Ranking	As of
The Cook Political Report	Tossup	November 6, 2008
Rothenberg	Lean R (flip)	November 2, 2008
Sabato's Crystal Ball	Lean R (flip)	November 6, 2008
Real Clear Politics	Lean R (flip)	November 7, 2008
CQ Politics	Tossup	November 6, 2008

Texas's 22nd congressional district, 2008
Party	Candidate	Votes	%
Republican	Pete Olson	161,996	52.43
Democratic	Nick Lampson (incumbent)	140,160	45.36
Libertarian	John Wieder	6,839	2.21
Total votes		308,995	100.00
Republican gain from Democratic			

=== Results by county ===
2008 results in Texas' 22nd congressional district (by county)
County	Pete Olson Republican		Nick Lampson Democratic		John Wieder Libertarian		Total votes
	#	%	#	%	#	%	#
Brazoria	21,802	53.8%	17,787	43.9%	956	2.3%	40,545
Fort Bend	68,779	51.4%	62,670	46.8%	2,450	1.8%	133,899
Galveston	8,898	39.5%	13,088	58.0%	566	2.5%	22,552
Harris	62,517	55.8%	46,615	41.6%	2,867	2.6%	111,999

== District 23 ==
2008 Texas's 23rd congressional district election
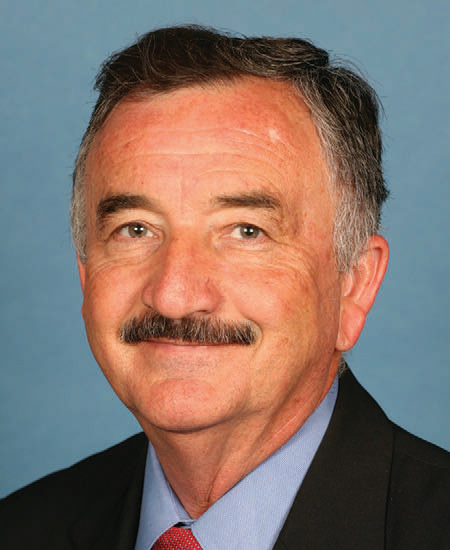

Nominee	Ciro Rodriguez	Lyle Larson
Party	Democratic	Republican
Popular vote	134,090	100,799
Percentage	55.8%	41.9%
- County results Rodriguez: 40–50% 50–60% 60–70% 70–80% 80–90% Larson: 50–60%
U.S. Representative before election
Ciro Rodriguez
Democratic
Elected U.S. Representative
Ciro Rodriguez
Democratic

Ciro Rodriguez, a former Democratic congressman from San Antonio, faced Republican nominee Bexar County Commissioner Lyle Larson and Libertarian Lani Connolly in this majority-Hispanic district. CQ Politics considered this race 'Leans Democratic'.

Rodriguez defeated incumbent Republican Henry Bonilla in a December runoff after finishing in second place to Bonilla during the November general election, when Rodriguez himself ran out of money but was later helped by the DCCC. He was a former congressman who represented the nearby 28th District until a controversial redistricting plan that made this district more heavily Republican and favorable to Bonilla resulted in his defeat by that district's current representative, Henry Cuellar. Bonilla was seen as an ally of Tom DeLay, who engineered the redistricting. Also, a Supreme Court ruled Bonilla's district, which was situated in the Hill Country suburbs of San Antonio, unconstitutional over claims that Hispanic voting rights were diluted in the redistricting. This resulted in the 23rd becoming much more Democratic with the addition of south San Antonio, which is Rodriguez's home base, and the removal of the Hill Country portions from the district, which were moved to Lamar S. Smith's district.

Larson is a public official and businessman in San Antonio. A graduate of Texas A&M University, he worked as a salesman for Ethicon, a subsidiary of Johnson & Johnson. In 1991 and 1993, Larson was elected to the San Antonio City Council. In 1996, he was elected as one of the four Bexar County commissioners. He defeated attorney and banker Quico Canseco in the Republican primary for the U.S. House in 2008.

In addition to southern San Antonio and Bexar County, the district also includes several northwestern areas of San Antonio. Other areas represented in the district include the border towns of Del Rio and Eagle Pass, as well as Big Bend National Park and eastern El Paso County. It includes more than 600 miles of the Texas–Mexico border.

=== Predictions ===
Source	Ranking	As of
The Cook Political Report	Likely D	November 6, 2008
Rothenberg	Safe D	November 2, 2008
Sabato's Crystal Ball	Lean D	November 6, 2008
Real Clear Politics	Safe D	November 7, 2008
CQ Politics	Lean D	November 6, 2008

Texas's 23rd congressional district, 2008
Party	Candidate	Votes	%
Democratic	Ciro Rodriguez (Incumbent)	134,090	55.76
Republican	Lyle Larson	100,799	41.92
Libertarian	Lani Connolly	5,581	2.32
Total votes		240,470	100
Democratic hold			

== District 24 ==
2008 Texas's 24th congressional district election
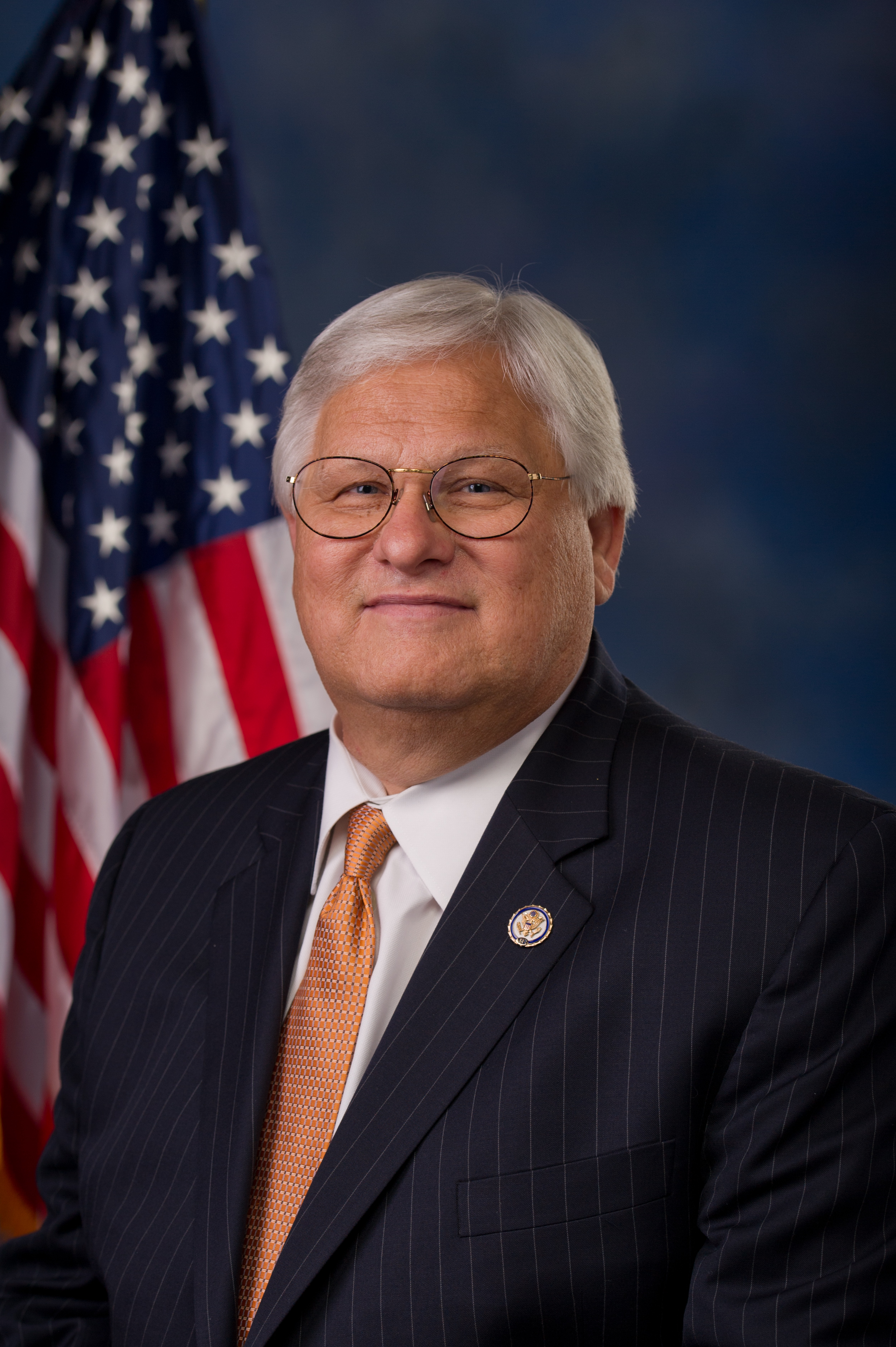

Nominee	Kenny Marchant	Tom Love
Party	Republican	Democratic
Popular vote	151,434	111,089
Percentage	56.0%	41.1%
- County results Marchant: 40–50% 50–60% 60–70%
U.S. Representative before election
Kenny Marchant
Republican
Elected U.S. Representative
Kenny Marchant
Republican

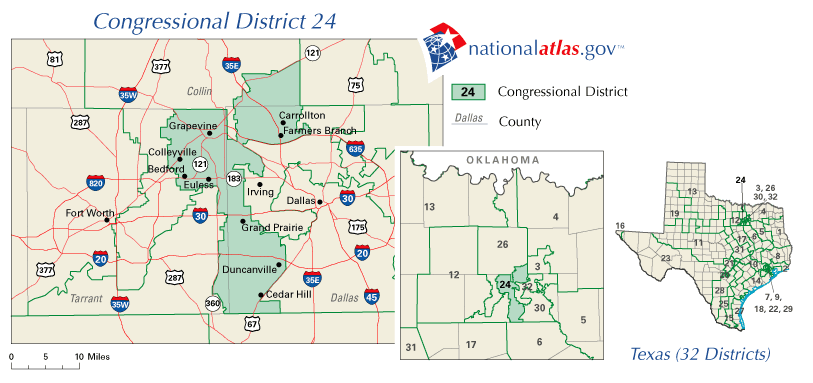

Republican Kenny Marchant of Coppell won 60% of the vote in this Republican-leaning district that gave George W. Bush 65% of the vote in 2004. Marchant is heavily favored to win re-election to this district, which is located in the middle of the Dallas/Fort Worth Metroplex and includes the suburbs of Duncanville and Cedar Hill in the south, Grand Prairie and part of Irving in the central area of the district, and Colleyville, Grapevine and the Carrollton–Farmers Branch area in the north, as well as Dallas/Fort Worth International Airport. Marchant's district was previously represented by Martin Frost, who was moved out of this district in Tom DeLay's controversial 2003 redistricting of the state.

=== Predictions ===
Source	Ranking	As of
The Cook Political Report	Safe R	November 6, 2008
Rothenberg	Safe R	November 2, 2008
Sabato's Crystal Ball	Safe R	November 6, 2008
Real Clear Politics	Safe R	November 7, 2008
CQ Politics	Safe R	November 6, 2008

Texas's 24th congressional district, 2008
Party	Candidate	Votes	%
Republican	Kenny Marchant (incumbent)	151,434	55.98
Democratic	Tom Love	111,089	41.07
Libertarian	David Casey	7,972	2.95
Total votes		270,495	100
Republican hold			

== District 25 ==
2008 Texas's 25th congressional district election
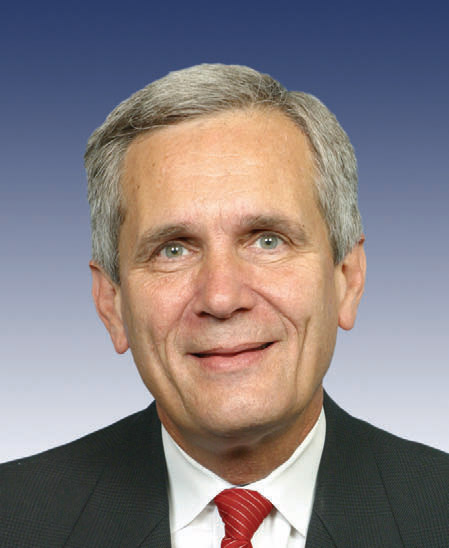

Nominee	Lloyd Doggett	George Morovich
Party	Democratic	Republican
Popular vote	191,755	88,693
Percentage	65.8%	30.4%
- County results Doggett: 50–60% 60–70% 70–80% Morovich: 50–60%
U.S. Representative before election
Lloyd Doggett
Democratic
Elected U.S. Representative
Lloyd Doggett
Democratic

Austin Democrat Lloyd Doggett represents a Democratic-leaning constituency that is centered on the Austin area and several smaller rural areas to the south and east which either lean Republican or strongly favor Republicans. Doggett won 67% of the vote against a largely unknown Republican opponent who initially ran as a Libertarian until the previous 25th district was thrown out in a Supreme Court ruling that declared the nearby 23rd District of Henry Bonilla unconstitutional; this district was realigned as a result of the controversial mid-decade redistricting engineered by former House Majority Leader Tom DeLay, which realigned Doggett's district into a linear form that was derisively referred to as the "fajita strip".

=== Predictions ===
Source	Ranking	As of
The Cook Political Report	Safe D	November 6, 2008
Rothenberg	Safe D	November 2, 2008
Sabato's Crystal Ball	Safe D	November 6, 2008
Real Clear Politics	Safe D	November 7, 2008
CQ Politics	Safe D	November 6, 2008

Texas's 25th congressional district, 2008
Party	Candidate	Votes	%
Democratic	Lloyd Doggett (Incumbent)	191,755	65.83
Republican	George Morovich	88,693	30.45
Libertarian	Jim Stutsman	10,848	3.72
Total votes		291,296	100
Democratic hold			

== District 26 ==
2008 Texas's 26th congressional district election

Nominee	Michael Burgess	Ken Leach
Party	Republican	Democratic
Popular vote	195,181	118,167
Percentage	60.2%	36.4%
- County results Burgess: 60–70% 70–80% Leach: 40–50%
U.S. Representative before election
Michael Burgess
Republican
Elected U.S. Representative
Michael Burgess
Republican

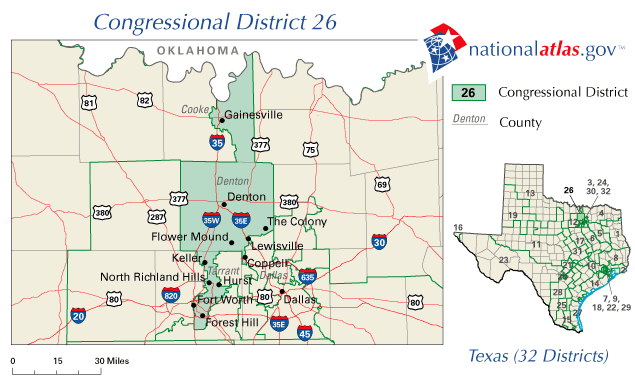

Republican Michael Burgess of Lewisville won 60% of the vote in 2006 against an underfunded Democratic opponent, a six-percent drop from his 2004 victory against another Democrat. However, Burgess remains assured of a safe seat, as his seat takes in most of Denton County as well as parts of Fort Worth and lean heavily in favor of the Republican Party. The district was once represented by former House Majority Leader Dick Armey, who engineered the 1994 Republican Revolution along with former House Speaker Newt Gingrich.

=== Predictions ===
Source	Ranking	As of
The Cook Political Report	Safe R	November 6, 2008
Rothenberg	Safe R	November 2, 2008
Sabato's Crystal Ball	Safe R	November 6, 2008
Real Clear Politics	Safe R	November 7, 2008
CQ Politics	Safe R	November 6, 2008

Texas's 26th congressional district, 2008
Party	Candidate	Votes	%
Republican	Michael Burgess (incumbent)	195,181	60.17
Democratic	Ken Leach	118,167	36.43
Libertarian	Stephanie Weiss	11,028	3.40
Total votes		324,376	100
Republican hold			

== District 27 ==
2008 Texas's 27th congressional district election
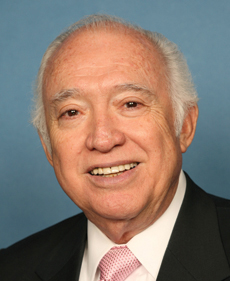

Nominee	Solomon Ortiz	William Willie Vaden
Party	Democratic	Republican
Popular vote	104,864	69,458
Percentage	58.0%	38.4%
- County results Ortiz: 50–60% 60–70% 70–80% Vaden: 50–60%
U.S. Representative before election
Solomon Ortiz
Democratic
Elected U.S. Representative
Solomon Ortiz
Democratic

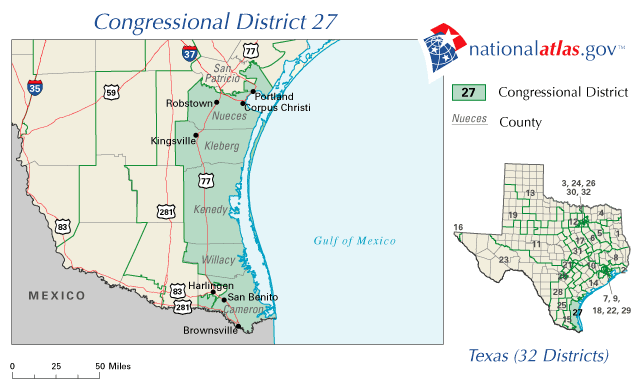

The District is represented by moderate Democrat Solomon Ortiz, the Dean of the Congressional Hispanic Caucus. Ortiz received 57% of the vote in 2006, a six-point decline from his 2004 performance, which was somewhat of an anomaly given the strong anti-Republican voting mood of 2006, where Democrats either performed above their 2004 performance or ran without opposition. In 2004, George W. Bush carried this South Texas district, which includes Corpus Christi as well as Brownsville and South Padre Island.

=== Predictions ===
Source	Ranking	As of
The Cook Political Report	Safe D	November 6, 2008
Rothenberg	Safe D	November 2, 2008
Sabato's Crystal Ball	Safe D	November 6, 2008
Real Clear Politics	Safe D	November 7, 2008
CQ Politics	Safe D	November 6, 2008

Texas's 27th congressional district, 2008
Party	Candidate	Votes	%
Democratic	Solomon Ortiz (Incumbent)	104,864	57.95
Republican	William Willie Vaden	69,458	38.38
Libertarian	Robert E. Powell	6,629	3.66
Total votes		180,951	100
Democratic hold			

== District 28 ==
2008 Texas's 28th congressional district election
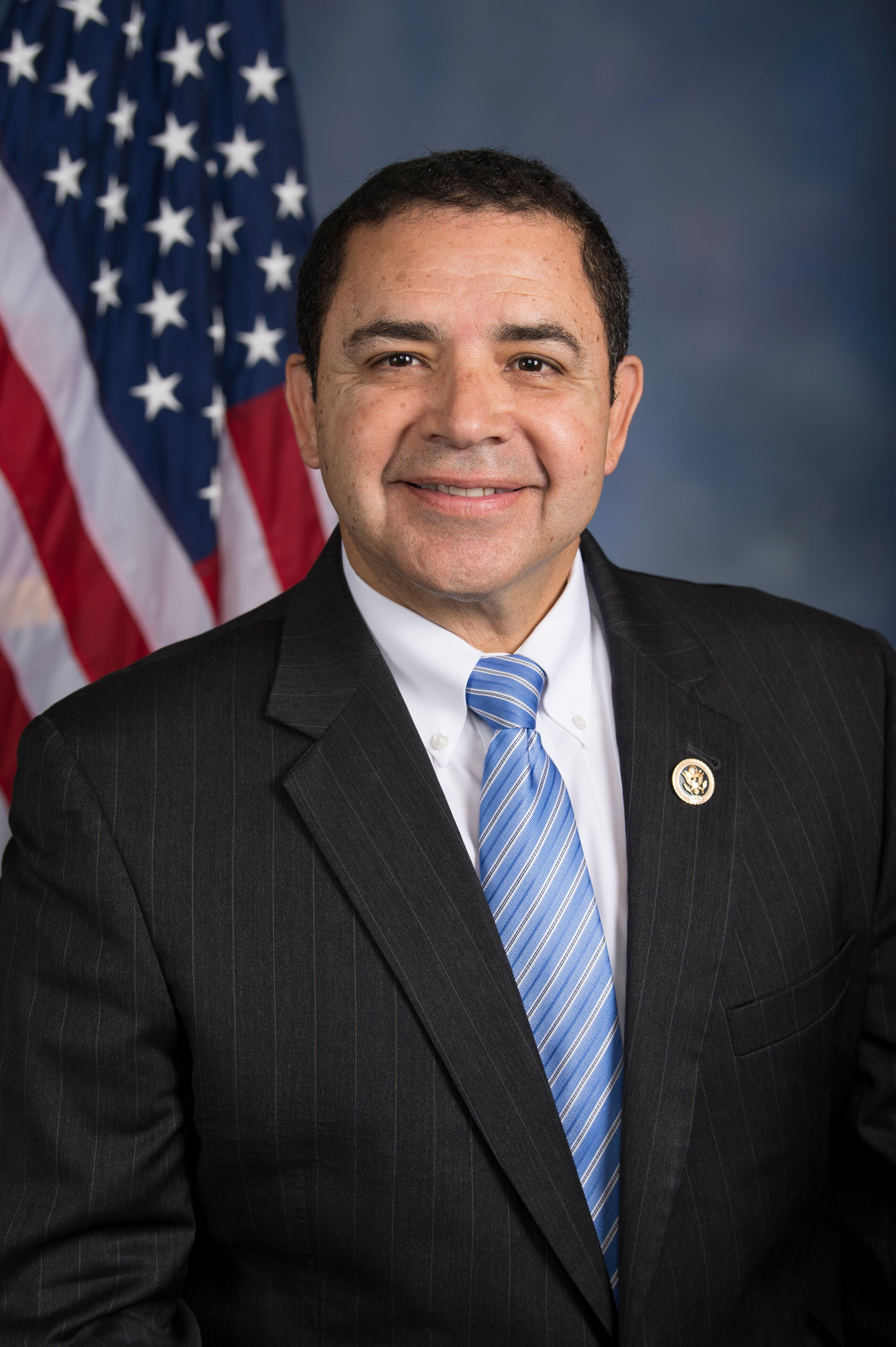

Nominee	Henry Cuellar	Jim Fish
Party	Democratic	Republican
Popular vote	123,494	52,524
Percentage	68.7%	29.2%
- County results Cuellar: 50–60% 60–70% 70–80% 80–90% 90–100% Fish: 50–60%
U.S. Representative before election
Henry Cuellar
Democratic
Elected U.S. Representative
Henry Cuellar
Democratic

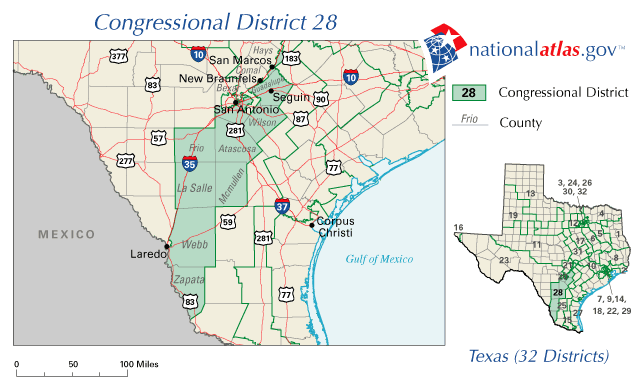

Conservative Democrat Henry Cuellar won 68% of the vote in 2006 against another Democrat who received 20% of the vote. Even though Cuellar is becoming a rising star in the Democratic Party, and has even been seen by some as a potential Democratic challenger to Senator John Cornyn, Cuellar could face a challenge for his seat, which includes Laredo (where Cuellar resides) and areas south of San Antonio, due to his somewhat conservative voting record. For instance, Cuellar received the backing of the conservative Club for Growth during his 2006 primary campaign against Ciro Rodriguez, his predecessor, who later went on to win the 23rd District held by Republican Henry Bonilla, whom Cuellar nearly defeated in 2002. Cuellar won the Democratic nomination.

=== Predictions ===
Source	Ranking	As of
The Cook Political Report	Safe D	November 6, 2008
Rothenberg	Safe D	November 2, 2008
Sabato's Crystal Ball	Safe D	November 6, 2008
Real Clear Politics	Safe D	November 7, 2008
CQ Politics	Safe D	November 6, 2008

Texas's 28th congressional district, 2008
Party	Candidate	Votes	%
Democratic	Henry Cuellar (Incumbent)	123,494	68.71
Republican	Jim Fish	52,524	29.22
Libertarian	Ross Lynn Leone	3,722	2.07
Total votes		179,470	100
Democratic hold			

== District 29 ==
2008 Texas's 29th congressional district election
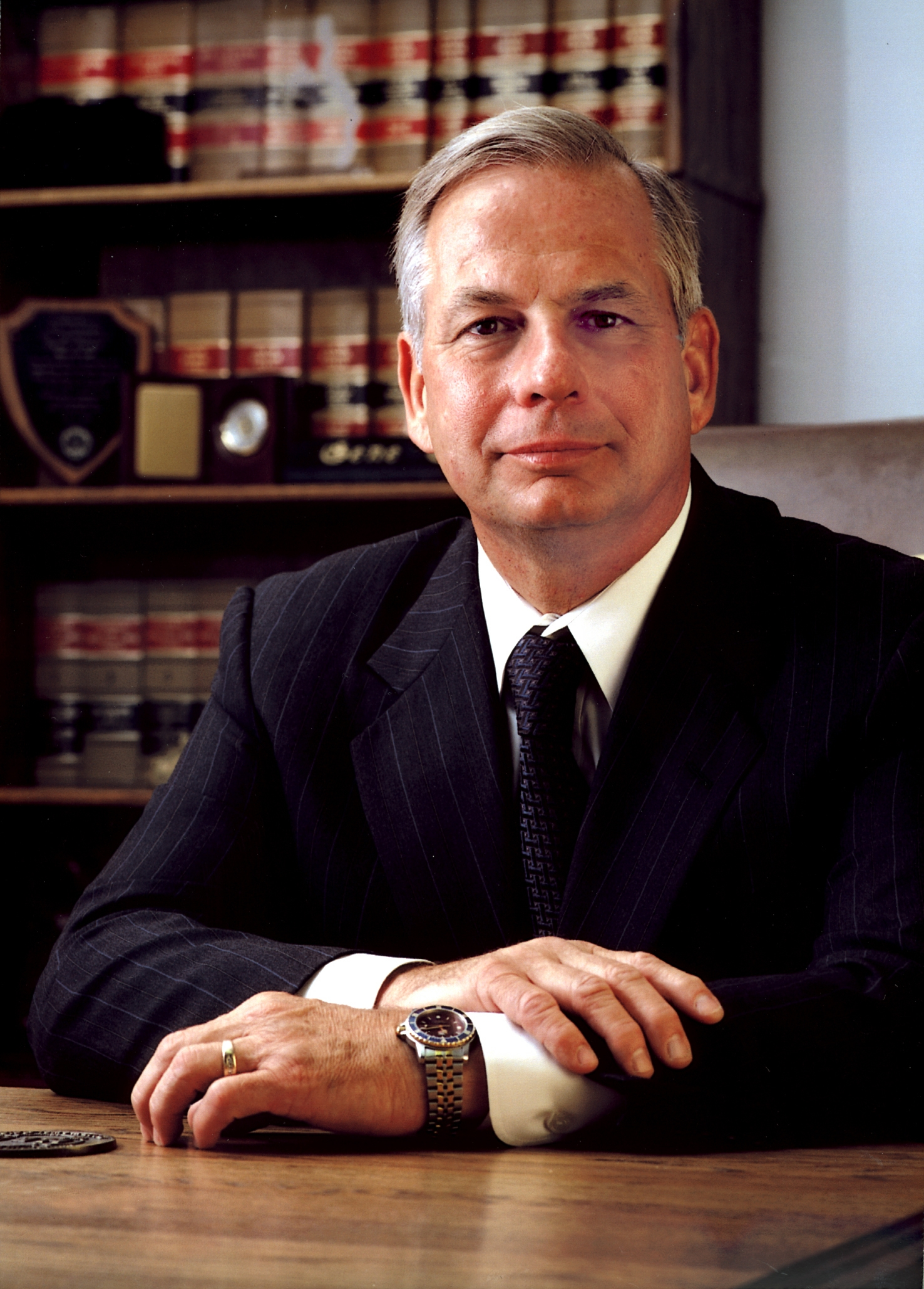

Nominee	Gene Green	Eric Story
Party	Democratic	Republican
Popular vote	79,718	25,512
Percentage	74.7%	23.9%
- County results Green: 70–80%
U.S. Representative before election
Gene Green
Democratic
Elected U.S. Representative
Gene Green
Democratic

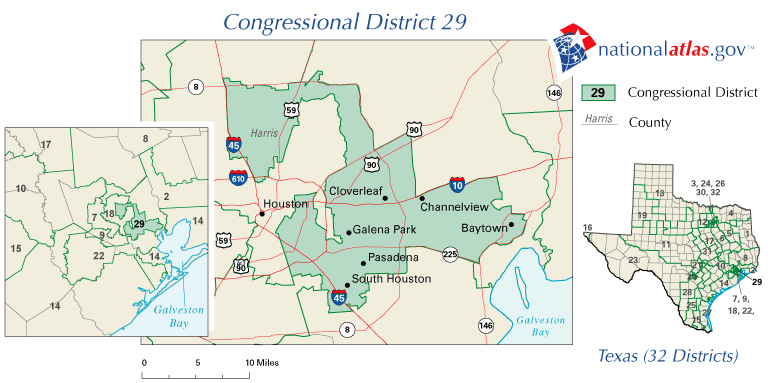

Democrat Gene Green of Houston has won re-election easily without facing a primary challenge in this strongly Latino, heavily Democratic district, which covers eastern portions of Houston as well as some of its suburbs.

=== Predictions ===
Source	Ranking	As of
The Cook Political Report	Safe D	November 6, 2008
Rothenberg	Safe D	November 2, 2008
Sabato's Crystal Ball	Safe D	November 6, 2008
Real Clear Politics	Safe D	November 7, 2008
CQ Politics	Safe D	November 6, 2008

Texas's 29th congressional district, 2008
Party	Candidate	Votes	%
Democratic	Gene Green (Incumbent)	79,718	74.65
Republican	Eric Story	25,512	23.89
Libertarian	Joel Grace	1,564	1.46
Total votes		106,794	100
Democratic hold			

== District 30 ==
2008 Texas's 30th congressional district election
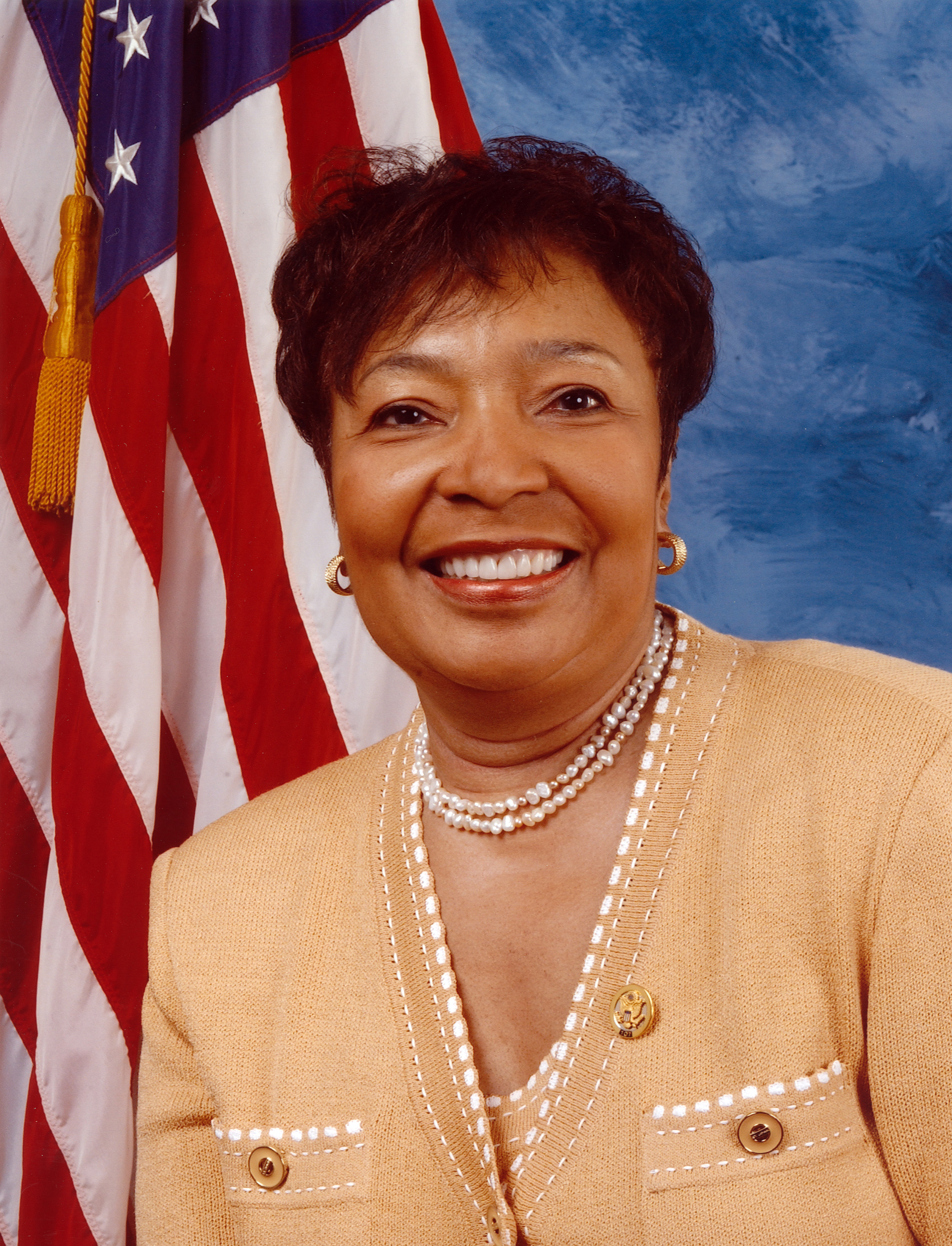

Nominee	Eddie Bernice Johnson	Fred Wood
Party	Democratic	Republican
Popular vote	168,249	32,361
Percentage	82.5%	15.9%
- County results Johnson: 80–90%
U.S. Representative before election
Eddie Bernice Johnson
Democratic
Elected U.S. Representative
Eddie Bernice Johnson
Democratic

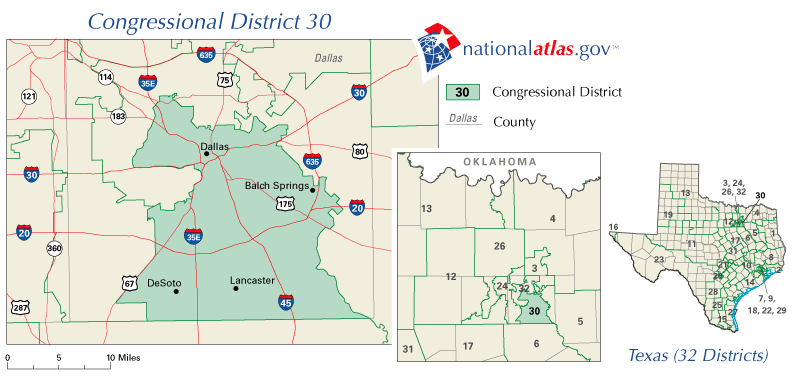

Incumbent Democratic nominee Eddie Bernice Johnson of Dallas defeated Republican nominee Fred Wood 82.6–15.8%. This district includes the inner city areas of Dallas, including its downtown areas, as well as several southern Dallas County suburbs south of the city which boast a large African-American population.

=== Predictions ===
Source	Ranking	As of
The Cook Political Report	Safe D	November 6, 2008
Rothenberg	Safe D	November 2, 2008
Sabato's Crystal Ball	Safe D	November 6, 2008
Real Clear Politics	Safe D	November 7, 2008
CQ Politics	Safe D	November 6, 2008

Texas's 30th congressional district, 2008
Party	Candidate	Votes	%
Democratic	Eddie Bernice Johnson (Incumbent)	168,249	82.48
Republican	Fred Wood	32,361	15.87
Libertarian	Jarrett Woods	3,366	1.65
Total votes		203,976	100
Democratic hold			

== District 31 ==
2008 Texas's 31st congressional district election
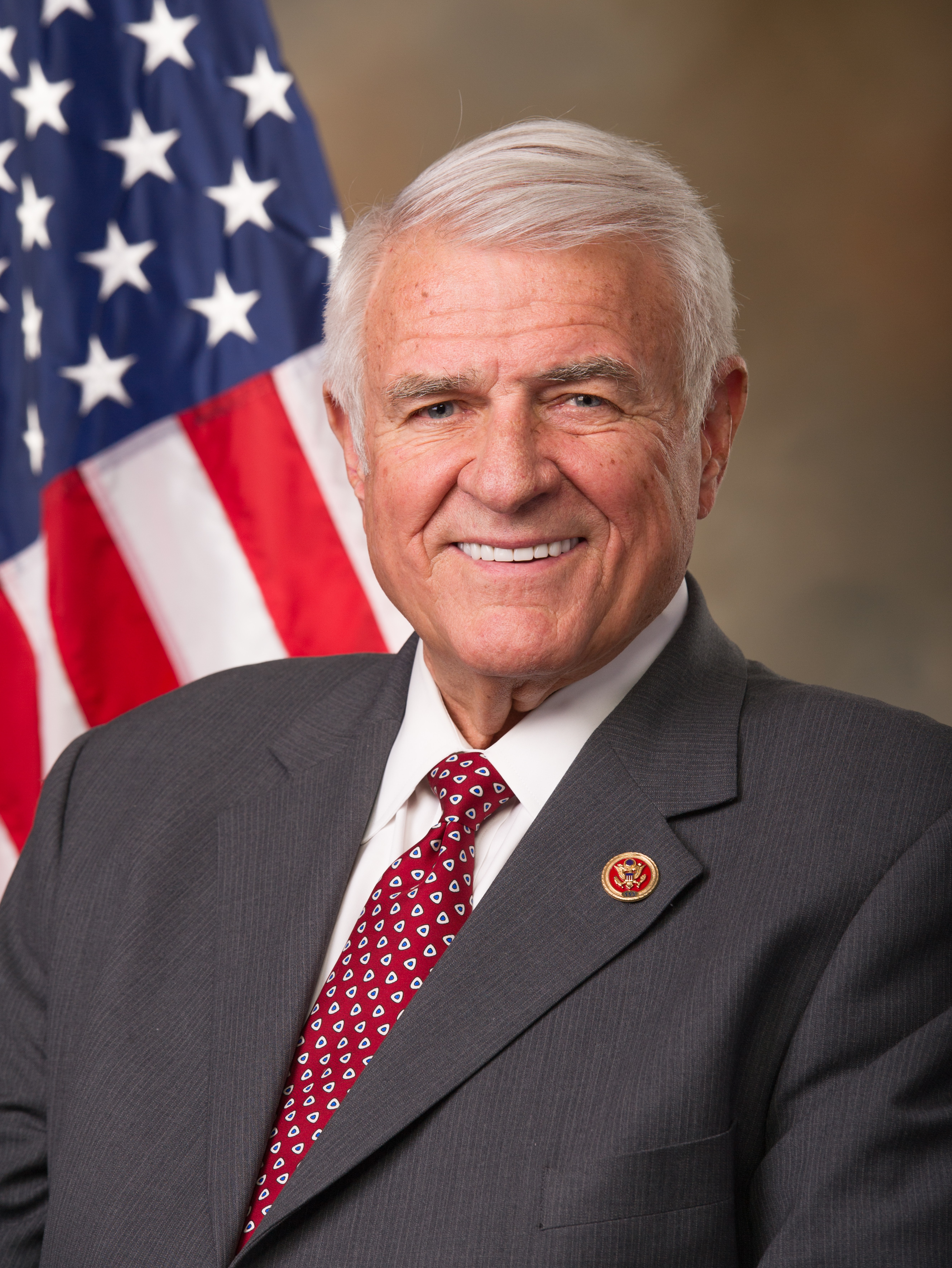

Nominee	John Carter	Brian Ruiz
Party	Republican	Democratic
Popular vote	175,563	106,559
Percentage	60.3%	36.6%
- County results Carter: 50–60% 60–70% 70–80%
U.S. Representative before election
John Carter
Republican
Elected U.S. Representative
John Carter
Republican

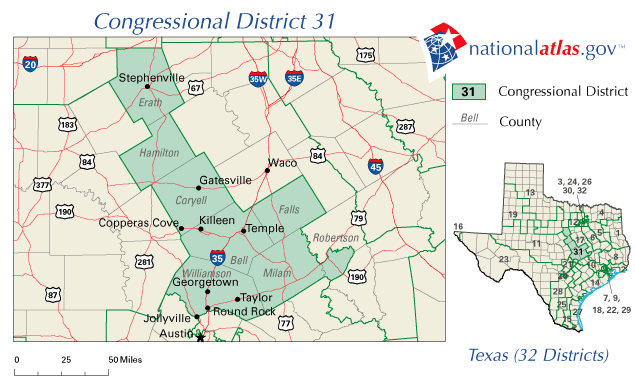

John Carter of Round Rock won 59% of the vote in 2006 against a token Democratic opponent. His district, which was created as a result of the 2000 census, stretches across a large segment of Central Texas from the northern Williamson County suburbs of Austin to the gigantic Fort Hood military base, all the way north to Stephenville. This description of the district would make it an opportunity for the Fighting Dems, a faction of military veterans who are members of the Democratic Party. Radio producer Brian P. Ruiz of Hutto won the Democratic nomination.

=== Predictions ===
Source	Ranking	As of
The Cook Political Report	Safe R	November 6, 2008
Rothenberg	Safe R	November 2, 2008
Sabato's Crystal Ball	Safe R	November 6, 2008
Real Clear Politics	Safe R	November 7, 2008
CQ Politics	Safe R	November 6, 2008

Texas's 31st congressional district, 2008
Party	Candidate	Votes	%
Republican	John Carter (incumbent)	175,563	60.27
Democratic	Brian Ruiz	106,559	36.58
Libertarian	Barry Cooper	9,182	3.15
Total votes		291,304	100
Republican hold			

== District 32 ==
2008 Texas's 32nd congressional district election

Nominee	Pete Sessions	Eric Roberson
Party	Republican	Democratic
Popular vote	116,283	82,406
Percentage	57.3%	40.6%
- County results Sessions: 50–60%
U.S. Representative before election
Pete Sessions
Republican
Elected U.S. Representative
Pete Sessions
Republican

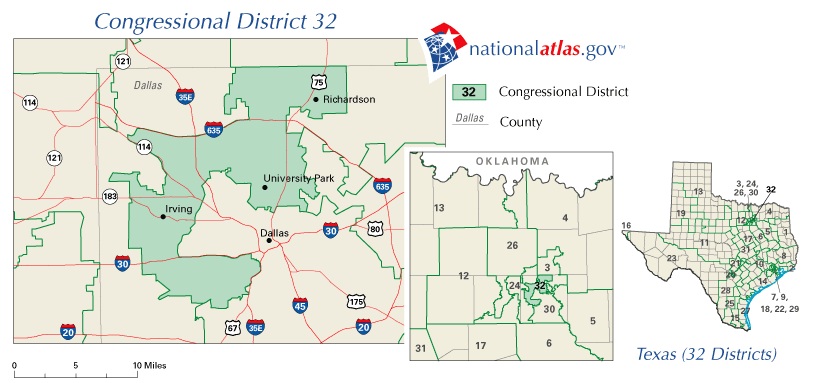

Six-term incumbent and conservative Republican Pete Sessions faced Democrat Eric Roberson in this Dallas district. Sessions was considered to be a vulnerable candidate for a number of reasons. First, he is known to have close ties to disgraced lobbyist Jack Abramoff, an issue that is likely to become the focus of his Democratic challenger's campaign in 2008. Also, while Sessions improved on his margin from his hotly contested 2004 race against Democrat Martin Frost, who was displaced from his previous district as a result of the controversial 2003 redistricting engineered by former House Majority Leader and Abramoff ally, Tom DeLay, it was only by a 2% margin (from 54% in 2004 to 56% in 2006). Contrarily, George W. Bush carried 59% of the vote in the district to 41% of the vote for John Kerry in 2004. Finally, in 2006, Democrats made unexpected gains in Dallas County, winning the District Attorney office and all contested state district judgeships in the county, along with a number of countywide offices on the basis of corruption within the local Republican establishment as well as momentum gained from Democratic Dallas County Sheriff Lupe Valdez's unexpected 2004 victory.

Roberson won against Steve Love in the April 8 party runoff election to determine the Democratic nominee. This Republican-leaning district includes several northern affluent areas of Dallas, including Highland Park, and significant chunks of the suburbs of Irving and Richardson.

=== Predictions ===
Source	Ranking	As of
The Cook Political Report	Safe R	November 6, 2008
Rothenberg	Safe R	November 2, 2008
Sabato's Crystal Ball	Safe R	November 6, 2008
Real Clear Politics	Safe R	November 7, 2008
CQ Politics	Safe R	November 6, 2008

Texas's 32nd congressional district, 2008
Party	Candidate	Votes	%
Republican	Pete Sessions (incumbent)	116,283	57.25
Democratic	Eric Roberson	82,406	40.57
Libertarian	Alex Bischoff	4,421	2.18
Total votes		203,110	100
Republican hold			
