= Rescue of Qaid Farhan al-Qadi =

Israeli hostage rescue operation

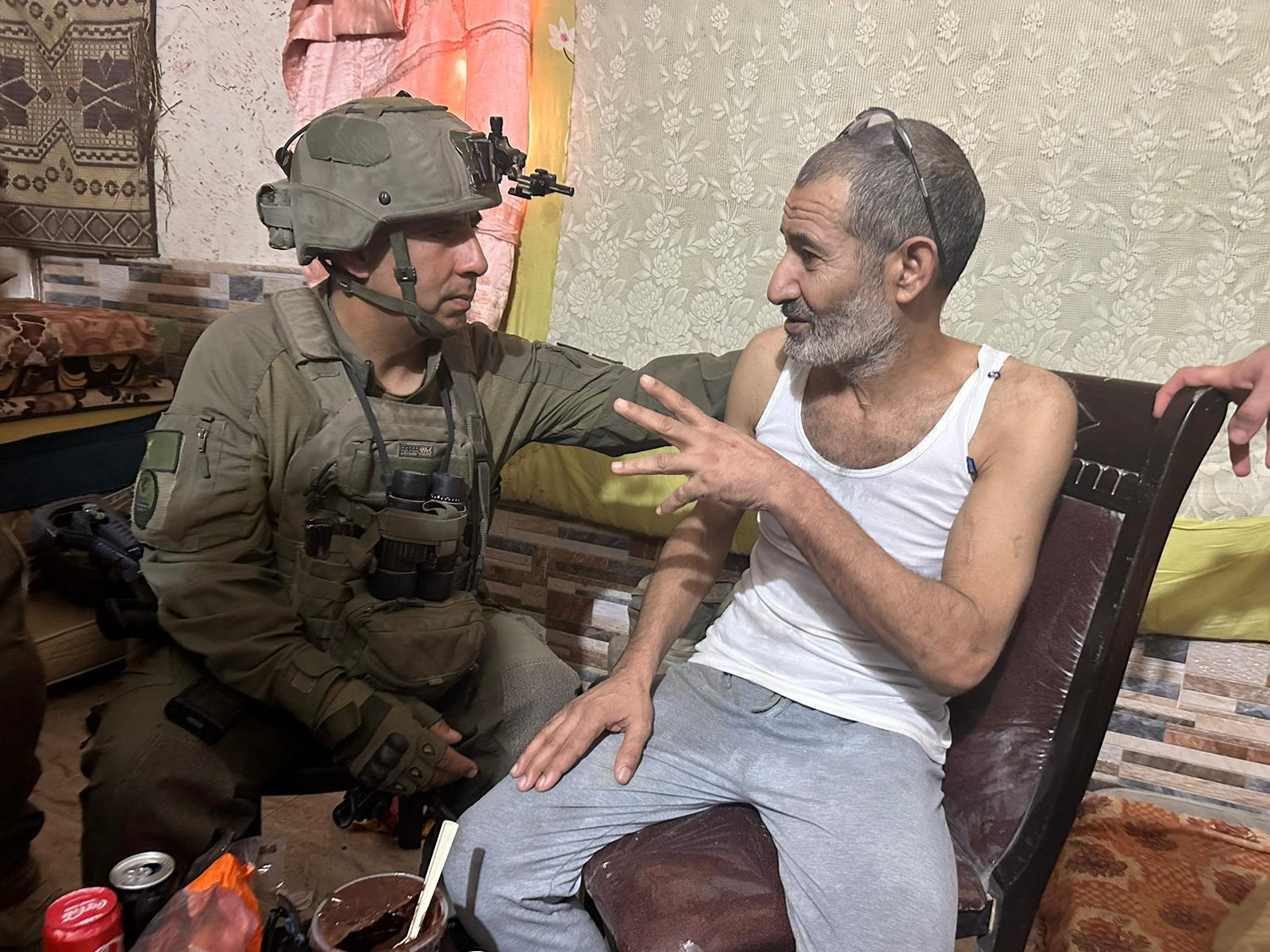
Al-Qadi with Tat Aluf (Brigadier general) Itzik Cohen, commander of the 162nd division, shortly after the rescue operation

Qaid Farhan al-Qadi (Arabic: قائد فرحان القاضي; Hebrew: קאיד פרחאן אל-קאדי; born c. 1972), an Israeli-Bedouin held hostage by Hamas since the October 7, 2023 attack on Israel, was rescued on August 27, 2024, after 326 days in captivity. Al-Qadi is from the Al-Kasum Regional Council, near the city of Rahat in the Negev. He was one of 251 people kidnapped from Israel, six of whom were Bedouin. The rescue operation was conducted by the Israel Defense Forces (IDF) and the Shin Bet in southern Gaza.

Al-Qadi is the eighth hostage to be rescued by Israeli forces since the conflict began. (Note: The first was the rescue of Ori Megidish in October 2023, two additional hostages were rescued in February 2024 in Operation Golden Hand, and four additional hostages were rescued in June 2024 in Operation Arnon) The news of his release was celebrated within Israel's Bedouin community, which lost 16 members during the October 7 attacks, although the mood in Al-Qadi's village was complicated by pending demolition orders.

== Abduction ==
Al-Qadi is a father of 11 children and has two wives. On October 7, 2023, during the Hamas attack on Israel, al-Qadi was abducted while working as a guard at a packing house in Kibbutz Magen. Until his rescue, Israel had not received any information regarding his whereabouts and welfare.

Al-Qadi initially was held in an apartment where he witnessed and was filmed with a fellow captive's death. He formed a bond with Aryeh Zalmanovich, another Israeli hostage who was later killed. After being moved to a tunnel, Al-Qadi faced severe deprivation, including only being allowed to shower once a month and being kept in total darkness, which made it impossible for him to distinguish day from night. He also underwent painful surgery without proper anaesthesia. Two weeks before his rescue, his captors fled after hearing IDF drills, leaving him in an underground room with minimal food and rigged explosives to prevent escape.

== Rescue ==
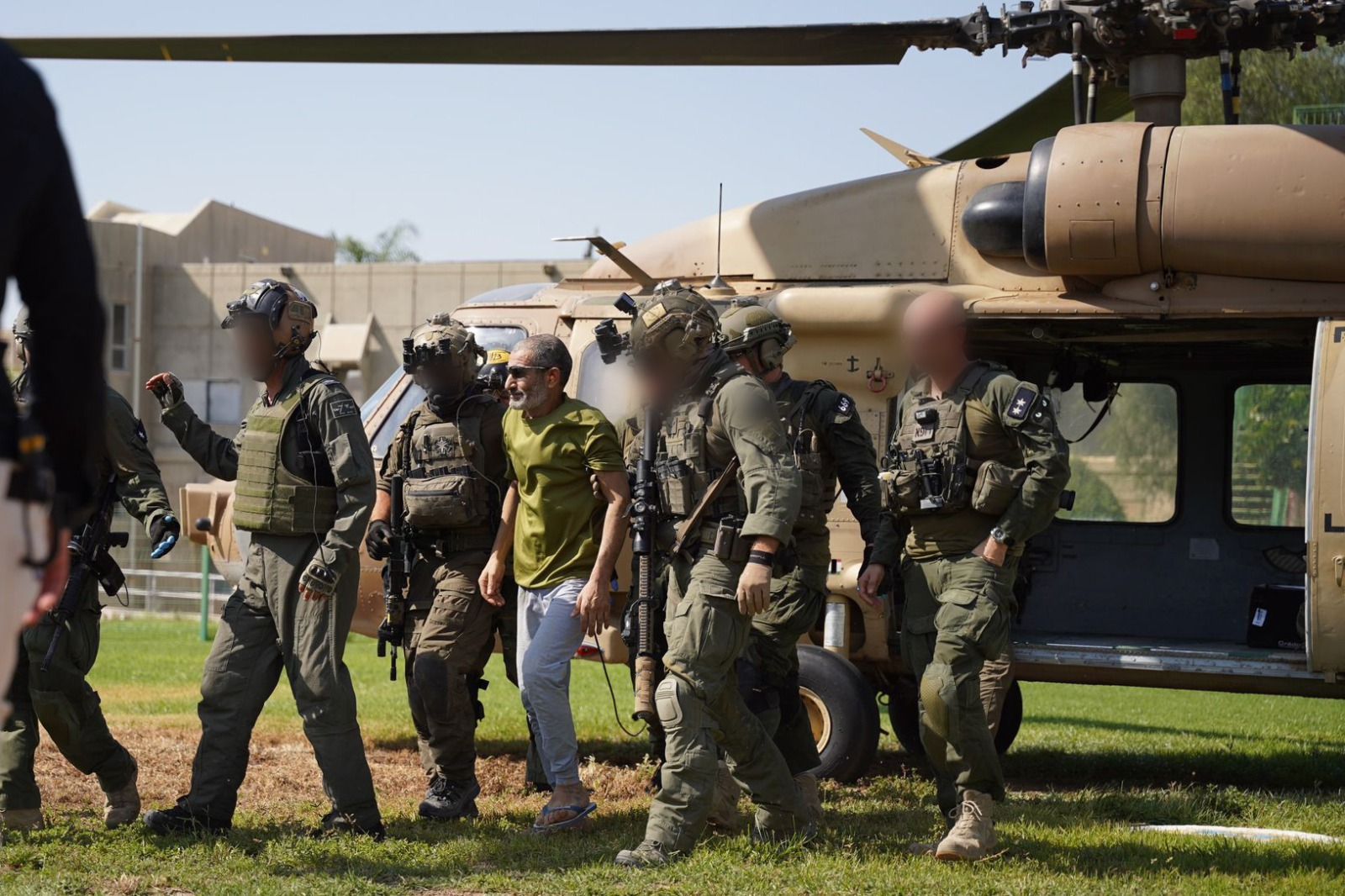
Rescue of Al-Qadi

It was initially announced on August 27, 2024 that Farhan al-Qadi was rescued from Gaza in a joint operation conducted by the Israel Defense Forces (IDF) and the Shin Bet in southern Gaza. However it was later revealed that the Israeli forces found him by chance, as the soldiers were not performing a rescue operation. He was found abandoned, with only a little bit of bread to eat. The tunnel was found rigged with explosives, to ensure that he would not make it out alive, should he try to flee. Upon hearing Hebrew, Al-Qadi identified himself to the soldiers.

Al-Qadi is the eighth hostage to be rescued by Israeli forces since the conflict began, and the first to be rescued from a tunnel. The operation was part of Israel's broader military campaign in Gaza aimed at dismantling Hamas, following the October 7 attack that killed approximately 1,200 people, most of them civilians, and resulted in the kidnapping of 251 others.

Al-Qadi's family was joyfully reunited with him at Soroka Medical Center in Beersheba. The news of his release was received with great joy within the Israel's Bedouin community, which lost 16 members on the Hamas attack on Israel. Some were killed by rockets fired from Gaza, and others by Hamas Nukhba fighters who murdered them despite the fact that they were Arabic-speaking Muslims.

The day after his rescue, Al-Qadi was released from the hospital to his home in the village of Khirbet Karkur, which is among the Bedouin villages in Israel that is unrecognized. Celebration in the village of Al-Qadi's rescue was tainted by a pending demolition order of 70% of the homes in the village, as the homes were built without permits. A spokesperson for the Israel Land Authority stated that in light of his status as a former hostage, they would not serve a demolition notice on his home.

Al-Qadi was the third and final of six Israeli Bedouins who were kidnapped to Gaza during Hamas' October 7 massacre to have returned from captivity alive. The other two, 17-year-old Aisha and 18-year-old Bilal al-Zayadna, were released in November 2023 during the 2023 Israeli–Palestinian prisoner exchange. The bodies of the latter's father, Yousef, and elder brother, Hamza, were recovered from a tunnel in January 2025; Al-Qadi eulogized Yousef, who had been his neighbour and childhood friend. The sixth Bedouin, Samer al-Talalka, had been shot dead by IDF troops after escaping his captors along with another two hostages in December 2023.

== See also ==
- List of Gaza war hostages
- Kidnapping of Elkana Bohbot
- Kidnapping of Shoshan Haran
- Kidnapping of Evyatar David
- Bar Kupershtein
- Kidnapping of Avinatan Or
- Edan Alexander
- Omer Neutra
- Omer Shem Tov
- Eli Sharabi
- Kidnapping of Noa Argamani
