= Texas Justice =

American reality court show (2001–2005)

- Genre: Arbitration-based reality court show
- Starring: Larry Joe Doherty (judge), William M. Bowers Jr. (bailiff)
- Narrated by: Randy Schell
- Theme music composer: Scott Szabo
- Country of origin: United States
- Original language: English
- No. of seasons: 5
- No. of episodes: 587

Production
- Production locations: KRIV Studios Houston, Texas
- Camera setup: Multi-camera
- Running time: 30 minutes (including commercials)
- Production company: 20th Television

Original release
- Network: First-run syndication
- Release: March 26, 2001 – May 20, 2005

Texas Justice is an American syndicated arbitration-based reality court show.

In the program, cases were run by former Houston attorney Larry Joe Doherty, and the program was recorded at the studios of Fox station KRIV (Channel 26) in Houston, Texas.

The series lasted for 5 seasons in syndication from March 26, 2001 until May 20, 2005. The show was canceled in September 2005. Living up to the court show's title, the program's look, music and style evoked a country rural presence and cowboy atmosphere. To boot, Doherty had an innate country drawl and a Walker, Texas Ranger-like aura about him.

The show was replaced by Judge Alex, which also taped at KRIV for its first 5 seasons. Judge Alex aired from September 12, 2005 to May 21, 2014.

Reruns of the show have aired on CMT, Ion Television, and El Rey Network as well as on the Nosey app during the 2018–19 season.
