= Mark Mays =

American businessman

Mark Pitman Mays
- Education: Vanderbilt University (BA); Columbia Business School (MBA)
- Occupation: Businessman
- Title: Former President and CEO of Clear Channel Communications (2004–2010)
- Father: Lowry Mays
- Relatives: Michael McCaul (brother-in-law)

Mark Pitman Mays is an American businessman. He is the former president and chief executive officer (CEO) of Clear Channel Communications Inc. (parent entity of iHeartMedia), which was co-founded by his father, Lowry Mays in 1972. After serving the company in other roles, Mays took over as president and CEO from October 2004 until 2010.

== Early life ==
Mays graduated from the Hotchkiss School in Lakeville, Connecticut in 1981. Mays holds a B.A. from Vanderbilt University in Math and Economics, and an M.B.A. from Columbia Business School. Mays is an Eagle Scout.

== Career ==
On February 4, 2007, Mays resigned from his position as Chairman at Live Nation.

In October 2007, 41 Democratic United States Senators sent a letter of request to Mays, asking him to renounce Rush Limbaugh for his comments allegedly referring to all soldiers who disagreed with the Iraq War as "phony soldiers". Mays gave Limbaugh the letter, who in turn auctioned it on eBay of behalf of the Marine Corps-Law Enforcement Foundation, netting $4.2 million in total for the charity, including the matching funds.

On June 22, 2010, Mays announced his intention to step down as CEO at the end of 2010, but would remain as chairman of the board at Clear Channel. The announcement additionally directed the Board to begin a search for his replacement and was sent via email to all Clear Channel employees.

Mays is a member of the National Executive Board of the Boy Scouts of America, the organization's governing body. He serves on the board of trust of his alma mater, Vanderbilt University.
