= Lowry Mays =

American businessman (1935–2022)

- Born: Lester Lowry Mays; July 24, 1935; Houston, Texas, U.S.
- Died: September 12, 2022 (aged 87); San Antonio, Texas, U.S.
- Education: A&M College of Texas (BS); Harvard University (MBA)
- Occupation: Businessman
- Spouse: Peggy Pitman (m. 1959; died 2020)
- Children: 4, including Mark Mays
- Relatives: Michael McCaul (son-in-law)
- Military career
- Allegiance: United States
- Branch: United States Air Force

Lester Lowry Mays (July 24, 1935 – September 12, 2022) was an American businessman. He was the founder and chairman of Clear Channel Communications, now known as iHeartCommunications, Inc..

== Early life ==
Mays was born in Houston on July 24, 1935. His father, Lester T. Mays, was an executive in the steel industry and died in a car accident when Mays was twelve; his mother, Mary Virginia Lowry, became a real estate agent after her husband's death. Mays was raised in University Park in suburban Dallas, where he attended Highland Park High School. He studied at the A&M College of Texas (now Texas A&M University), where he received a Bachelor of Science in petroleum engineering.

== Career ==
After graduating in 1957, Mays joined the Air Force, where he served as an officer. Upon his discharge from the Air Force, Mays obtained a Master of Business Administration from Harvard University. He spent the following ten years as an investment banker and eventual vice president at Russ & Company.

In 1972, Mays and his partner Red McCombs founded the San Antonio Broadcasting Company, soon renamed Clear Channel Communications. The company purchased its first radio station, KEEZ-FM in San Antonio in 1972. He and McCombs bought a second "clear channel" station, WOAI, in 1975. Over the next several years, the company bought ten more struggling radio stations. Their first non–San Antonio acquisition was 1250 KPAC and 98.5 KPAC-FM in Port Arthur, bought from then-Port Arthur College, now Lamar State College–Port Arthur. Hoping to cover Houston for the first time, Clear Channel built a 2,000-ft tower near Devers, Texas for KPAC-FM. The effort failed to meet expectations and the station was sold after Clear Channel bought radio stations with in-town Houston signals. The company went public in 1984. Four years later, the company bought its first television station.

Before 1996, Clear Channel Communications owned 43 radio and 16 television stations. After the Telecommunications Act of 1996 significantly deregulated the broadcast industry, Mays and his company purchased 49 radio stations and an interest in New Zealand's largest radio group. Jacor Communications, who bought the broadcast side of Nationwide Insurance a year earlier, merged with Clear Channel in 1990 and brought 450 stations to the Clear Channel portfolio. As of 2000, Clear Channel owned over 1,200 radio stations, 41 television stations, over 750,000 outdoor advertising displays, and the events promoter later known as Live Nation.

In 1999, Mays was inducted into the Texas Business Hall of Fame.

In 2003, Mays testified before the US Senate that the deregulation of the telecommunications industry had not hurt the public. However, in an interview that same year with Fortune magazine, he remarked, "We're not in the business of providing news and information. We're not in the business of providing well-researched music. We're simply in the business of selling our customers' products."

Mays was inducted into the Radio Hall of Fame in 2004. After suffering a stroke the following year, Mays relinquished his position as a CEO of the company to his son, Mark Mays.

In 2008, Mays and McCombs sold Clear Channel Communications for $25 billion, and the company was renamed iHeartCommunications, Inc.

Mays served as a chairman of the United Way of San Antonio and was a member of the Associates Board at Harvard Business School.

== Involvement with Texas A&M University ==
Mays served on the Texas A&M Board of Regents from 1985 to 1991. He was reappointed to the Board of Regents in 2001 and served as chairman of the Board of Regents from 2003 to 2005. He was also a chair of the Presidential Library Committee and a member of the Committee on Buildings and Physical Plant and was the Board's special liaison to the Texas A&M Foundation. His final term on the Board of Regents expired on February 1, 2007.

Over the course of his life, Mays donated $40 million to Texas A&M, $15 million of which was directed towards the business department. In 1996, A&M renamed their business department Mays Business School.

== Personal life and death ==
Mays was married to Peggy Pitman from 1959 until her death in November 2020. Together, they had four children, Kathy, Mark, Linda, and Randall Mays. They lived in San Antonio, Texas, where they oversaw the operations and giving of the Mays Family Foundation. His son-in-law, Michael McCaul, is a Republican congressman from Texas's 10th congressional district.

Mays died in San Antonio on September 12, 2022, at age 87.

== Awards and honors ==
- 1997 San Antonio Business Hall of Fame
- 1998 Golden Plate Award of the American Academy of Achievement
- 1999 Texas Business Hall of Fame
- 2004 Radio Hall of Fame
- 2010 Sterling C. Evans Medal
