= Larry Joe Doherty =

American lawyer

- Born: July 29, 1946 (age 80); Hillsboro, Texas, U.S.
- Other name: LJD
- Occupations: attorney, judge, TV show host
- Years active: 2001–2005, as host of Texas Justice TV program
- Spouse(s): Joanne, 1960s–present

Larry Joe Doherty or LJD (born July 29, 1946) is a Texas legal ethics attorney and former television star of the syndicated courtroom show Texas Justice. He was the Democratic candidate for the 10th Congressional District of Texas in 2008, unsuccessfully challenging incumbent Republican Michael McCaul. Born in Hillsboro, Texas, Doherty is married to Joanne Doherty.

== Legal career ==
Doherty received a J.D. (Juris Doctor) from the University of Houston in 1970. He is a member of the Houston Bar Association and the State Bar of Texas. Doherty is a senior partner in the Houston law firm Doherty, Long & Wagner. Doherty specializes in legal malpractice cases.

Doherty is considered a pioneer in the field of legal malpractice, making a name for himself as the lawyer who sued other lawyers. He built a highly successful practice holding other attorneys accountable for misrepresenting their clients. As a senior partner in the law firm of Doherty, Long and Wagner, Larry Joe specialized in legal malpractice, because, as he explains, "people need to believe that the rule of law applies equally to everyone - and that no one, no matter how powerful, is beyond being held accountable for their actions."

Doherty and his wife Joanne have endowed a Chair on Ethics at the University of Houston Law Center.

== Television show ==
Doherty starred in the show Texas Justice from 2001–2005. The court show is currently in syndication. Doherty judged cases in the show, making legally binding decisions. The series lasted for 5 seasons, from March 26, 2001, until May 20, 2005. It was officially cancelled in September 2005.

Doherty's style on the show drew a contrast with other TV court shows that emphasize conflict between parties. Instead, Doherty was known for focusing on the root causes of the personal conflicts and emphasizing the importance of litigants to accept responsibility for their actions. According to a piece in Slate by Virginia Heffernan, "In his questioning, he looks for signs of affection and agreement.... He orchestrates things so that each case imparts a small emotional lesson ("be kind," "lighten up")." A 2009 commentary on Texas Justice states, "Judge Larry Joe's appeal lay in his accent, his double entendres, his ear for the rhythm of people's speech, his ability to rhyme on a dime, and the way he gently poked fun at the litigants. His lack of actual judicial experience might explain why ruling on the cases was not his strong suit."

== 2008 Congressional campaign ==
On April 4, 2007, Doherty announced his candidacy for the United States House of Representatives for the Tenth Congressional District of Texas, the seat currently held by Republican Michael McCaul. Doherty entered the race after McCaul's relatively low 2006 win percentage against Democratic opponent Ted Ankrum. The district had been designed to be safe for Republicans, but the Austin Chronicle noted:

Now, here we are five years down the road from Tom DeLay's infamous re-redistricting of Texas. DeLay is gone from Congress, disgraced. Nationally, voters swept the Republican "permanence" away in 2006. Even DeLay's seat is now held by a Democrat, one of the very politicians whose career he tried to end. And here in Austin, another of those supposedly safe seats is under serious threat.

Doherty's challenge generated intense interest among Texas and national political observers, as a seat previously thought to be "safe Republican" looked increasingly competitive. However, Doherty first had to survive the Democratic primary.

=== Democratic primary ===
Doherty decisively defeated primary challenger Dan Grant on the March 4, 2008 primary, with 61% to 39% out of 85,000 votes cast.

During the primary, Doherty was criticized by supporters of his primary opponent because his campaign treasurer, Houston philanthropist Jim "Mattress Mac" McIngvale, had participated in a fundraiser for Republican Mitt Romney's presidential campaign. Doherty used the criticism as an opportunity to point out his political independence. "I'm not going to be anybody's rubber stamp, and my treasurer is free to support anybody he wants to," Doherty said. "This is an independent country, last time I checked."

March, 2008 U.S. House Texas Congressional District 10 Democratic Primary Election.
Party	Candidate	Votes	%
Democratic	Larry Joe Doherty	51,977	61.11
Democratic	Dan Grant	33,072	38.88

=== Campaign message ===
Focusing on his own record in legal ethics, Doherty's critique of McCaul focused on the incumbent's association with former Republican Majority Leader Tom DeLay. One mail piece highlighted McCaul's vote to change House ethics rules in a way that would have allegedly benefited DeLay. Doherty's campaign also aired a television ad titled, "The Code," attempting to tie McCaul to the unfolding financial crisis by highlighting McCaul's Wall Street contributions and his vote against capping CEO salaries.

McCaul refused to face Doherty in a debate setting. According to the Houston Chronicle, "McCaul, an Austin Republican representing the district that includes a chunk of northwest Harris County, steadfastly refuses to debate his Democratic opponent, a colorful lawyer who once served as judge on the TV series Texas Justice." The Austin American Statesman provided three possible dates to McCaul's campaign, which were rejected. Doherty and McCaul are believed to have only met once during the campaign, at a Houston Chronicle interview.

The Statesman later endorsed Doherty's candidacy, citing McCaul's refusal to debate.

=== National Democratic support ===
Doherty's strong fundraising efforts and closing polling numbers elevated the race's national profile. Originally considered "Safe Republican" and a long shot at best for a Democratic challenger, the respected Cook Political Report eventually upgraded the race over time to "Leans Republican." In mid-October, the Democratic Congressional Campaign Committee (DCCC) designated the district a member of its "Red to Blue" program, directing additional funds and national support to Doherty's campaign. Former U.S. President Bill Clinton also recorded a robocall urging support for Doherty.

=== Iraq quote controversy ===
In October 2008, McCaul supporters criticized Doherty's controversial comments on the Iraq War in an interview with the Austin Chronicle that, "We've killed children for oil [in Iraq]." An Iraq War veteran, James Crabtree, criticized Doherty's comment in a letter, in online postings, on various radio programs, and eventually organized a protest at the Doherty for Congress campaign office. Doherty's statement produced a stern response from various veterans, Vets for Freedom, and Gold Star parents that felt his quote was akin to calling troops "baby killers" during the Vietnam War. They called on Doherty to apologize or explain his remarks. Doherty and his campaign never responded to this controversy.

=== Television show controversy ===
Attempting to generate press late in the campaign, Doherty's opponent McCaul recycled attempts by supporters of Doherty's primary opponent to insinuate Doherty was racially insensitive. McCaul's campaign released a series of clips from Doherty's show, Texas Justice, claiming Doherty mocked African-American participants. Also, Doherty was endorsed early in his campaign by the Black Austin Democrats and the Houston Black American Democrats, and independent polling showed Doherty with a 7-to-1 advantage over McCaul among African-American voters.

Doherty's campaign spokesperson responded, "He gets a great response to it. People still identify him with it and they truly loved watching that show. What he always worked to do through each episode was to let people know what they did wrong and that there's hope." And one entertainment reviewer directly refuted McCaul's attack:

But, the criticism of a political opponent that he mocked African-Americans on the show was entirely undeserved. When it came to mocking litigants, Larry Joe was equal opportunity all the way.

McCaul's use without permission of material from a blogger who supported Doherty's primary opponent led to McCaul's website being blocked from the Internet.

=== Election results ===
Doherty lost to McCaul by a 54% (179,493) to 43% (143,719) margin with the Libertarian, Matt Finkel, taking the remainder of the votes. McCaul won majorities in six of the eight counties in the district and overcame Doherty's 77,043 votes (60%) in liberal Travis County by running up 98,122 votes (68%) in the conservative northwest portions of Harris County.

Doherty would be named by the Austin Chronicle as the "biggest loser" for the fact that he received more votes than nine other candidates that won their congressional elections.

2008 U.S. House Texas Congressional District 10 Election.
Party	Candidate	Votes	%
Republican	Michael McCaul	179,493	53.9
Democratic	Larry Joe Doherty	143,719	43.1
Libertarian	Matt Finkel	9,871	2.96

== Continued political activism ==
In December 2008 Larry Joe Doherty emailed his supporters and pleaded for them to support the runoff election of Chris Bell for a Houston, Texas area state senate seat. Doherty stated that, "I'm asking you to make a difference in another important battle: Chris Bell for Texas Senate.... This is the last battleground of 2008, and Chris's victory is important to all Democrats and Texans who want change in Austin.... My friend Chris is the type of Democratic leader Texas needs -- a true visionary who will fight for real reform in the Texas Senate." Bell would earn only 43% of the vote and lose the election on Tuesday, December 16, 2008.

Doherty organized the South Central Texas Water Conservation Conference at Brenham, Texas, on October 3, 2009, under the auspices of the Texas Wildlife Association.

On August 10, 2009, Doherty publicly endorsed Jack McDonald's Democratic candidacy for McCaul's congressional seat. McDonald would then quit before the election.

== Environmentalism ==
Larry Joe Doherty is a former president of the Washington County Wildlife Society and a former board member of the Texas Wildlife Association, as well as a past member of the Texas Quail Council, an official advisory group to the Texas Parks and Wildlife Commission. Doherty maintains the "Long Star Ranch," near Brenham, Texas, as a 270-acre (1.1 km^{2}) wildlife habitat and native grass restoration project.
