= Rescue of Ori Megidish =

Hostage rescue during the Gaza war

Operation "Beginning of the Light" מבצע ראשית האור
- Part of the Gaza war
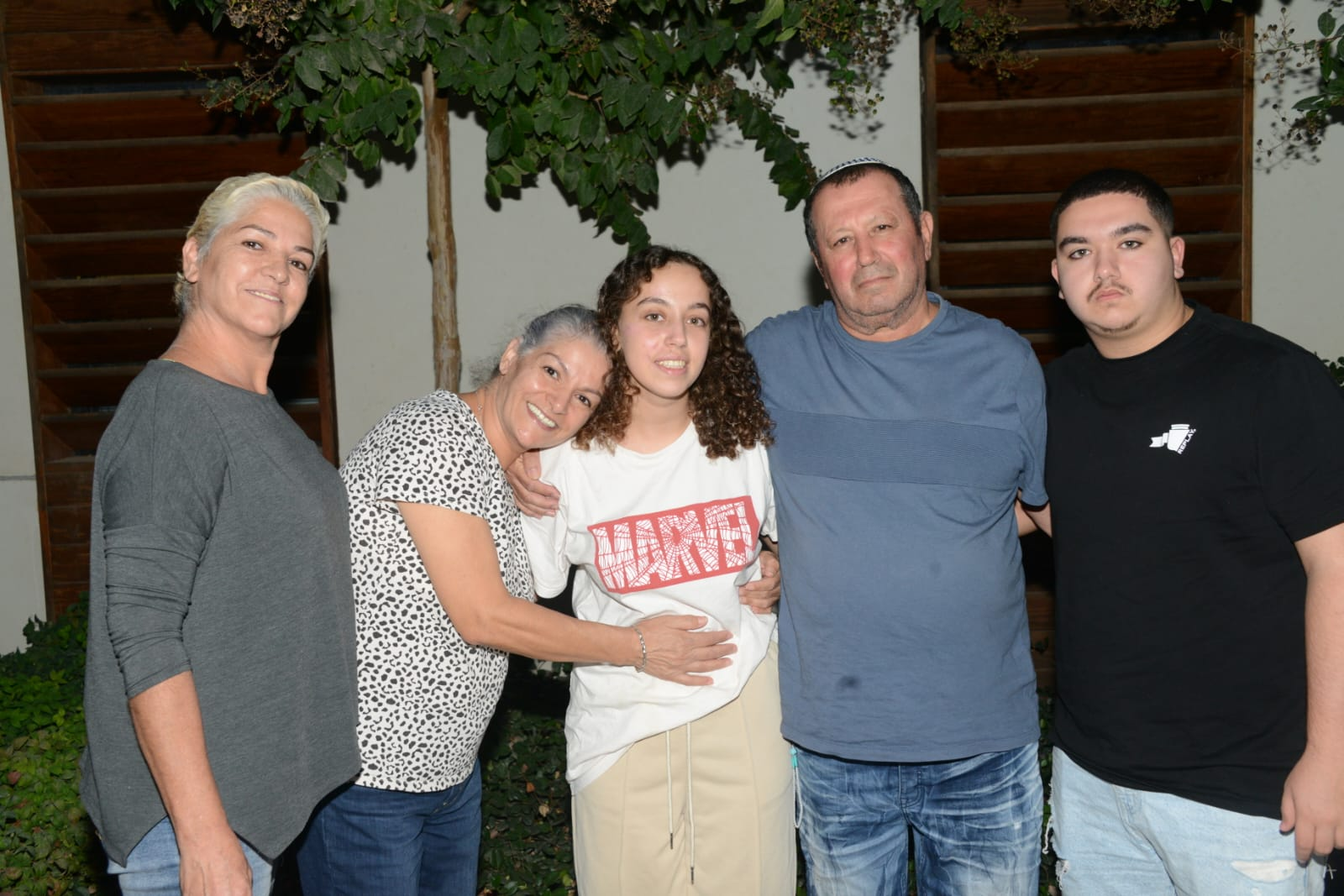
- Then-Private Magidish with her family after her rescue
Date	30 October 2023; 2 years ago
Location	Gaza Strip
Result	Fully successful rescue

The rescue of Ori Megidish was an Israel Defense Forces military operation (Hebrew: מבצע ראשית האור, Mivtza Reshit ha'Or, lit. Operation "Beginning of the Light") on 30 October 2023 during the Gaza war that led to the rescue of Israeli soldier Ori Magidish from Hamas imprisonment in Gaza to Israel. Megidish was rescued in a joint operation between the IDF and the Israeli Shin Bet, based on specific intelligence of her whereabouts. Two Hamas militants were killed during the operation.

Megidish's rescue was the first successful rescue operation by Israel in about two decades, and the first of the Gaza war.

== Abduction and captivity ==
On 7 October 2023, Megidish was an 18 year old private in the Israel Defense Forces (IDF). She was a "Spotter", one of what are known in Hebrew as the "tatzpitaniyot" (female members of the IDF who serve as field observers), at the Nahal Oz base watching for threats along the Israel-Gaza border by analyzing video filmed by cameras along the border fences. During the Hamas-led attack on Israel, she and other members of her unit were taken hostage after Hamas militants overran and briefly took over the Nahal Oz military base. Only two members of her unit escaped death or abduction.

While Megidish was kidnapped along with other soldiers from her base, she was believed to have been held in captivity alone. She had been held in an apartment near al-Shifa Hospital.

In May 2025, Megidish was profiled on the TV program, Uvda. In the interview, Megidish said that during Hamas's assault on her base, she took refuge in a bomb shelter. Eden Nimri, a fellow soldier whom Megidish did not know, tried to fight against the 30 to 40 terrorists who entered the shelter (Nimri's name was researched by Uvda). Nimri died in the gunfight. Megidish made eye contact with one of the terrorists, which she later characterized as a "mistake". She was taken into a car, that unbeknownst to her at the time, her close friend, Noa Marciano, was in the back. Another female soldier, Naama Levy, was later forced into the same vehicle. After arriving in Gaza, Marciano was separated from Megidish and Levy.

According to Megidish, one of her captors, whom she characterized as "the boss", sexually assaulted her, touching her inappropriately and showing an unusual interest in her chest wounds. It took her several months to come to terms with the fact that she was a victim of sexual harassment.

Megidish also said that the apartment she was held was hit in an Israeli airstrike on October 21. One of her captors was killed and she suffered a fractured skull and taken a hospital where she was treated without anesthesia.

== Rescue ==
Megidish's rescue overnight on 30 October in Gaza was the first successful rescue operation by Israel in about two decades, and the first of the Gaza war. Another rescue operation, Operation Golden Hand, took place on 12 February 2024, and resulted in the successful rescue of Fernando Simon Marman and Luis Herr. The operation was carried out by the Shin Bet and Yamam. A third successful rescue operation, originally named "Summer Seeds" but posthumously renamed "Operation Arnon", after Commander Arnon Zmora was killed in action, resulted in the rescue of four additional Israeli hostages: Noa Argamani, Shlomi Ziv, Almog Meir Jan, and Andrey Kozlov.

Megidish was limited in what she could tell the Israeli TV program, Uvda, in May 2025. All she could say was that she was asleep when the rescue operation started and woke up to the sound of gunfire. She instinctively reacted by screaming in Hebrew, and went with a man who appeared like a local Palestinian, not knowing if she was being taken hostage by another group. She did not realize she was being rescued until she was inside the getaway vehicle and the people in the vehicle spoke Hebrew with her.

== Aftermath ==
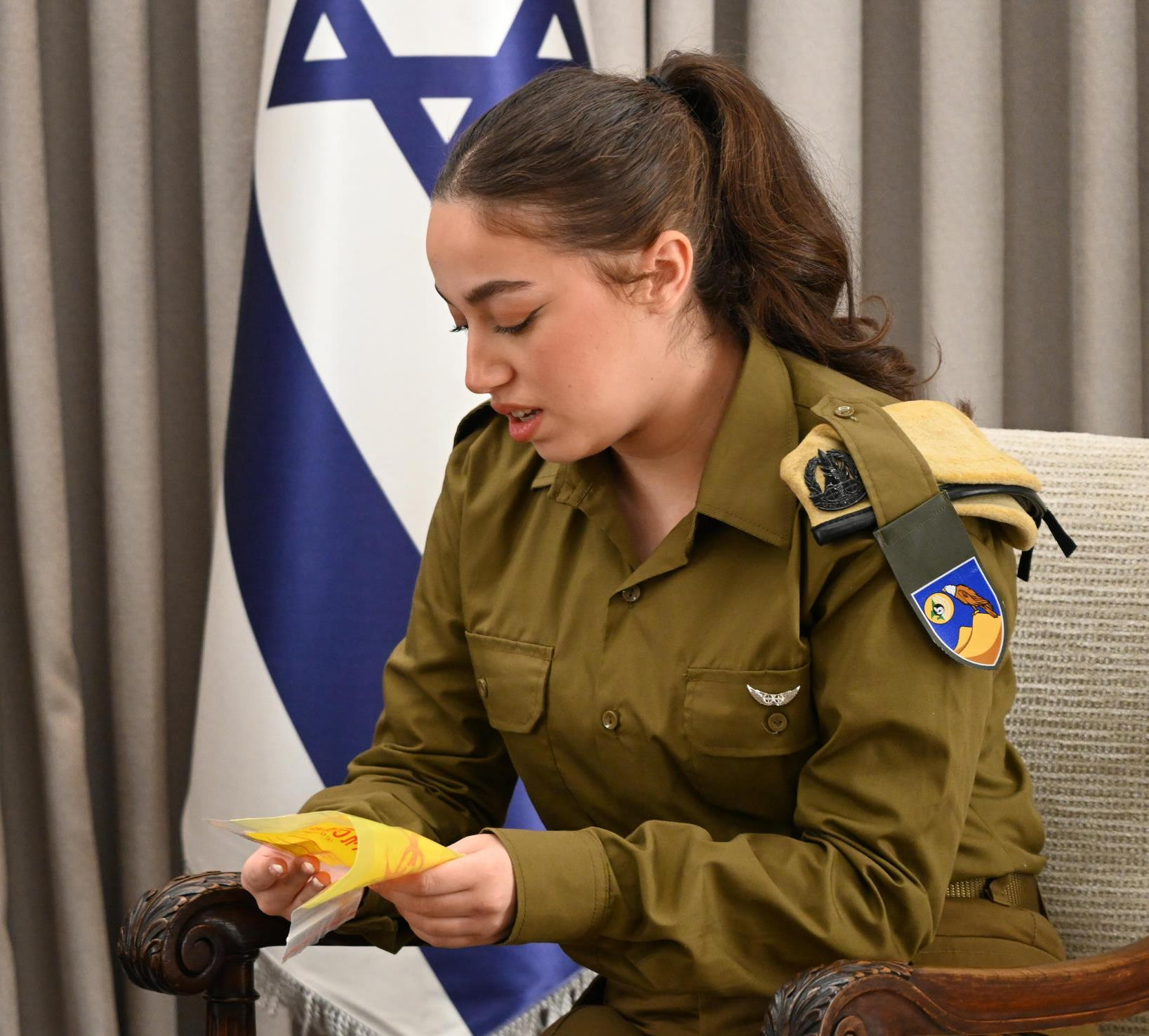
Megidish in January 2024

After her rescue, Megidish reportedly shared information with the Israeli military and intelligence officers about her captivity. Widespread celebrations were held in her hometown of Kiryat Gat after her release, and she met with Israeli President Isaac Herzog in January 2024. A month after her rescue, she cheered the release of other hostages during the 2023 Gaza war ceasefire by posting a video to social media. In the video, she expressed her desire that all the remaining hostages could reunite with their families as she had.

Megidish said that she had to deal with many issues since her rescue. One of them being the loss of her friend, Noa Marciano, who was kidnapped with her, but did not survive the captivity. Megidish also said that she had to deal with many false rumors about her, including a rumor that she was impregnated during her captivity.

On 26 February 2024, Megidish, since promoted to corporal, returned to active IDF service in the Military Intelligence Directorate.

In May 2024 Megidish was honored as one of the torchbearers in the national Israeli Independence Day ceremony.

== See also ==
- 2024 Nuseirat rescue operation
- Operation Golden Hand
