= Nuseirat refugee camp =

Refugee camp in Deir al-Balah, Palestine

Nuseirat Camp مخيّم النصيرات
- Refugee camp
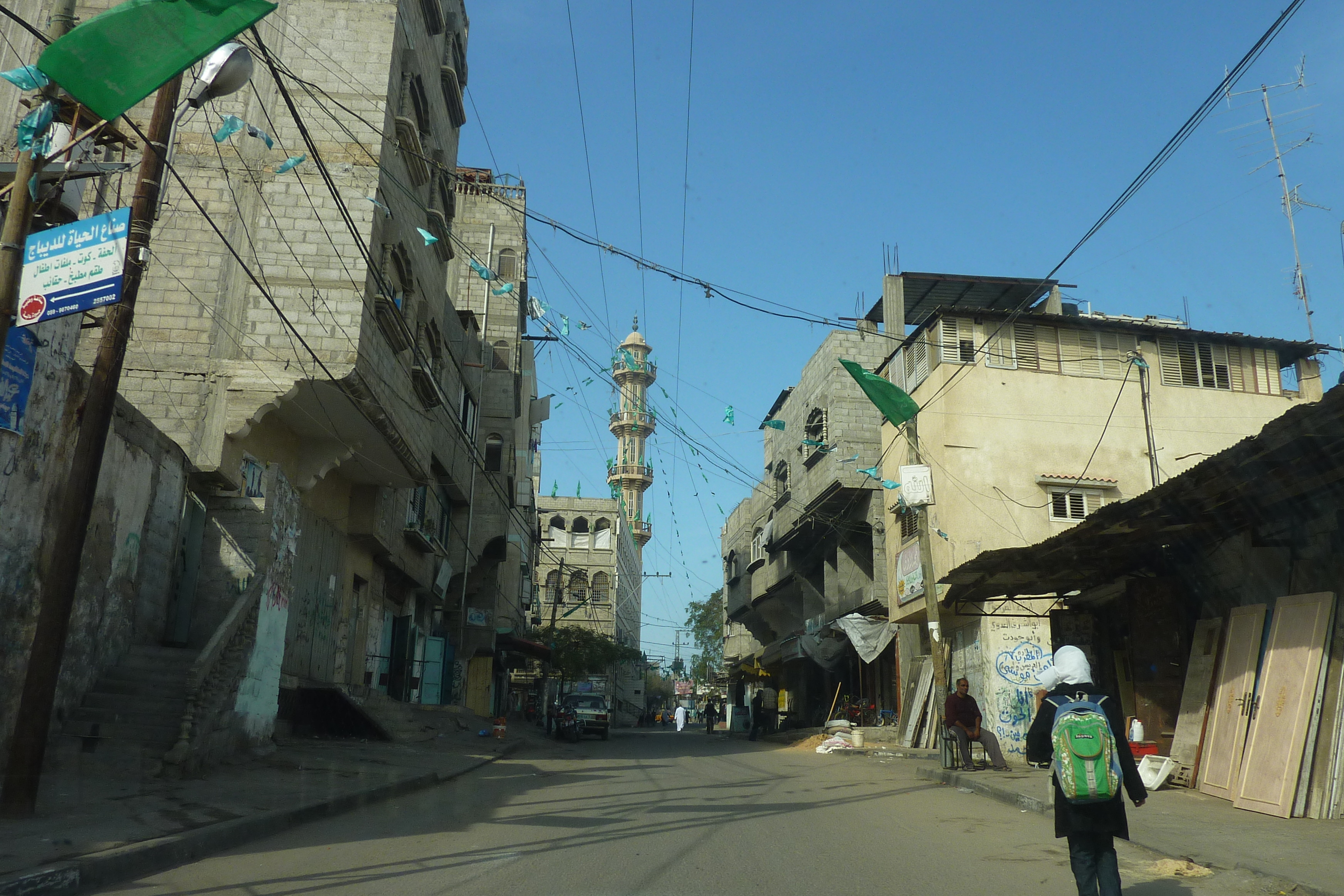
- Nuseirat in 2010

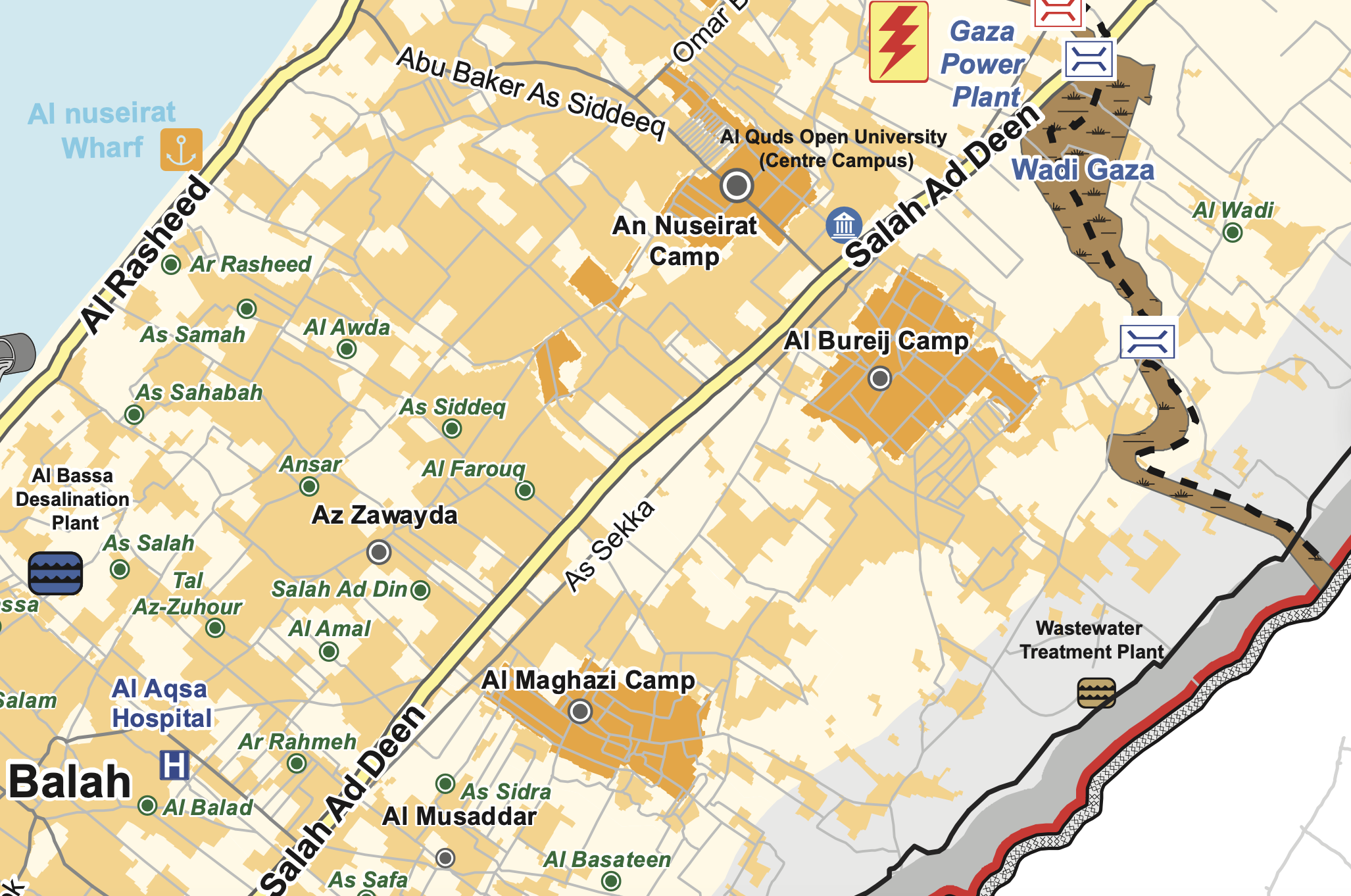
- Map of the camp, as well as the two other adjacent camps of Bureij and Maghazi

- Location of Nuseirat camp within Palestine
- Coordinates: 31°26′51″N 34°23′34″E
- State: State of Palestine
- Governorate: Deir al-Balah

Government
  - Type: Refugee Camp
  - Control: Hamas

Population (2024)
  - Total: 31,747
- Population total includes both the camp population and the population of the Nuseirat municipality

Nuseirat Camp (Arabic: مخيّم النصيرات) is a Palestinian refugee camp located in the middle of the Gaza Strip, five kilometers north-east of Deir al-Balah. The refugee camp is in the Deir al-Balah Governorate, Gaza Strip. According to the Palestinian Central Bureau of Statistics, the refugee camp had a population of 31,747 and the surrounding Nuseirat municipality had a population of 54,851 in 2017. The camp was established after the 1948 Palestinian expulsion during the 1948 Palestine war.

== History ==
=== Ancient history ===
The Nuseirat camp was named after the local Nuseirat tribe, part of the larger Hanajira confederation, that historically dominated the area between Deir al-Balah and Gaza. Excavations in the area have revealed remains of a large coenobium, including a church with a crypt, a bathhouse and a hospice, reminiscent of the monastery of Martyrius at Ma'ale Adummim. The side has been tentatively identified as that of the monastery of Seridus.

=== Origin of the refugee camp ===
The camp was established after the 1948 Palestinian expulsion during the 1948 Palestine war. Most refugees of this camp came from the southern areas of Palestine such as Beersheba and the coastal plain. Prior to the camp's establishment by UNRWA, the roughly 16,000 original refugees settled in the grounds of a former British military prison at the site.

=== 2000s ===
In May 2018 a mosque, the Grand Nuseirat Mosque, was opened by the Qatari envoy to Gaza, Mohammed Al Emadi.

==== Gaza war ====
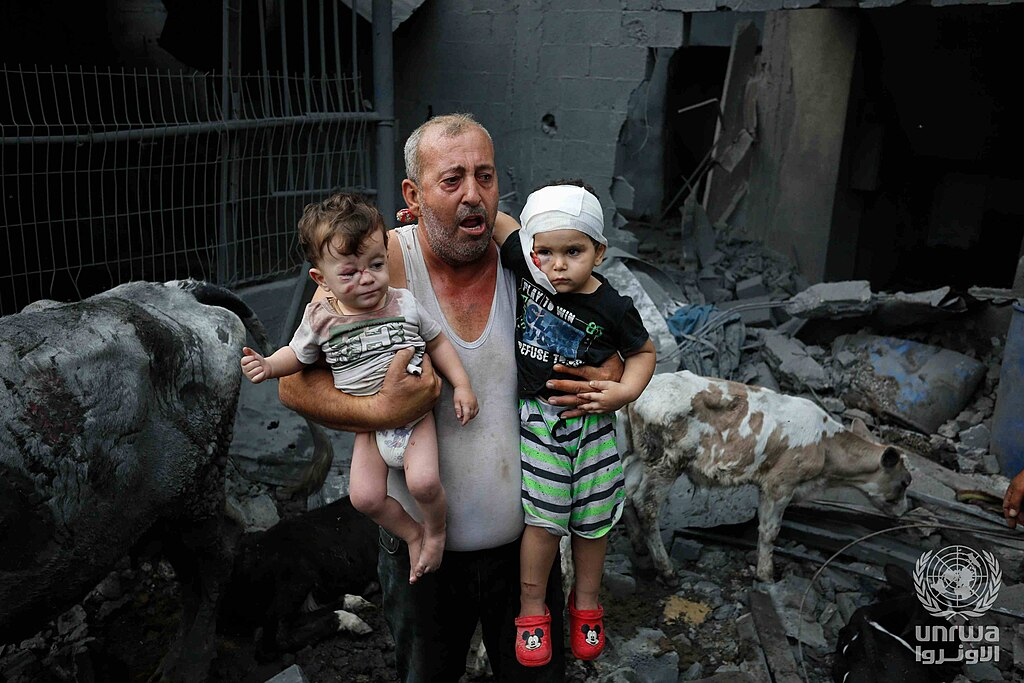
A resident of the camp carries his grandchildren injured by Israeli bombing. 29 October 2023

The Nuseirat refugee camp has been bombed repeatedly since the start of the Gaza war. On 18 October 2023 the Grand Nuseirat Mosque was bombed and destroyed by Israeli airstrikes, subsequently the attacks continued causing more than a hundred victims.

On 8 June 2024, the IDF and Yamam rescued four Israeli hostages held by Hamas in Nuseirat, including Noa Argamani, during a rescue operation. An IDF spokesperson claimed that the hostages were guarded by armed militants and concealed among Gazan civilians. The Gaza Health Ministry reported that at least 274 Palestinians were killed and 698 wounded in the Israeli airstrikes on the refugee camp, causing international outrage and the attack deemed a massacre. The operation took place in two sites in Nuseirat, where the hostages were kept, a school and a marketplace.

The IDF killed at least 10 civilians and injured at least 16 in a missile strike on a water distribution point on July 13, 2025. Six of the dead and seven of the wounded were children. The Israeli military stated the missile missed its intended target by dozens of meters because of a "technical error".

== Population ==
Census year	Population
2007	28,093
2017	31,747

== See also ==
- Khaled Nabhan
