= Kidnapping of Avinatan Or =

Israeli hostage taken by Hamas in 2023

- Part of the Gaza war hostage crisis
- Avinatan Or (left) being abducted from the Nova music festival on 7 October 2023. The IDF added highlights to show Ahmad Abu Marhil (center) and Ahmad Ibrahim Rajab Shaar (right) whom the IDF assassinated in 2025
- Location: near Re'im, Israel
- Date: 7 October 2023 (kidnapping) – 13 October 2025 (release); 738 days held hostage
- Attack type: kidnapping, hostage taking
- Perpetrator: Hamas

Avinatan Or (Hebrew: אבינתן אור; born 6 February 1993) was kidnapped along with his then-girlfriend, Noa Argamani, by Hamas militants during the Nova music festival massacre near Re'im on October 7, 2023.

Or was released on 13 October 2025, after 738 days in Hamas captivity, as part of the third Gaza war ceasefire agreement.

== Early life ==
Or was born on 6 February 1993, and was raised in Shilo, an Israeli settlement in the West Bank. He is the son of Yaron and Ditza Or and has two brothers and four sisters. Or was recorded to be almost 2 metres (6 ft 7 in) tall.

Or studied at Yeshivat Shavei Hevron and served in the Israel Defense Forces as a combat soldier in the elite Gidonim Unit (Battalion 97).

He graduated with a degree in electrical and computer engineering from Ben-Gurion University of the Negev, where he met his girlfriend Noa Argamani, and later worked as an engineer at Nvidia's chip-development division. Before their abduction, the couple lived in Tel Aviv.

== Abduction ==
On 7 October 2023, Or and Argamani were attending the Nova music festival near Kibbutz Re'im when Hamas launched its large-scale surprise attack on Israel. As hundreds of militants overran the site and began attacking fleeing participants, the couple escaped the main dance area and hid in the surrounding woods. For several hours they remained in contact with Israeli security forces, until a group of militants discovered and captured them.

They were immediately separated: Or was forced to march on foot toward Gaza under armed guard, while Argamani was dragged onto the back of a motorcycle. Video footage recorded by the captors and released the same day shows Argamani screaming, reaching towards Or in as she is carried away, while Or, hands raised, is led off surrounded by at least four gunmen. The clip spread rapidly worldwide and became one of the most widely recognized and enduring images of the October 7 attacks.

== Captivity ==
Having completed his combat service in the IDF's elite Gidonim Unit (Battalion 97), Hamas designated Or a "captured soldier" rather than a civilian hostage. Or was reportedly held in solitary confinement and bound during his captivity unable to freely walk around. He also recounted being kept in the dark of information and light sources. According to his father, after his release Or had no access to books or human contact during his captivity, but was able to obtain a Rubik's Cube to occupy himself. Or stated that he used his engineering background to collect data and keep himself occupied, along with attempting to carry on conversations with his captors.

On 12 March 2025, Israeli authorities received the first proof-of-life indication concerning Or; intelligence assessments placed him in Hamas captivity in the central Gaza Strip. Accounts provided by subsequently released hostages described severe malnutrition caused by prolonged deprivation of food and water, as well as marked psychological deterioration. After his release Or's father stated that Or had not been starved but the available food was very meager and he was extremely thin upon release.

Following his release, Or recounted an unsuccessful escape attempt in which he dug for weeks with improvised tools, briefly emerged one night, and wrote the word "HOSTAGE" on a sandbag before being discovered and severely beaten. He reported being subjected to extended periods of solitary confinement, frequent restraint, and repeated physical and psychological abuse. Or's mother further claimed that captors administered collective beatings to the hostages as a retaliatory response to a video purportedly showing abuse of Palestinian prisoners in the Sde Teiman detention camp.

== Efforts to release ==
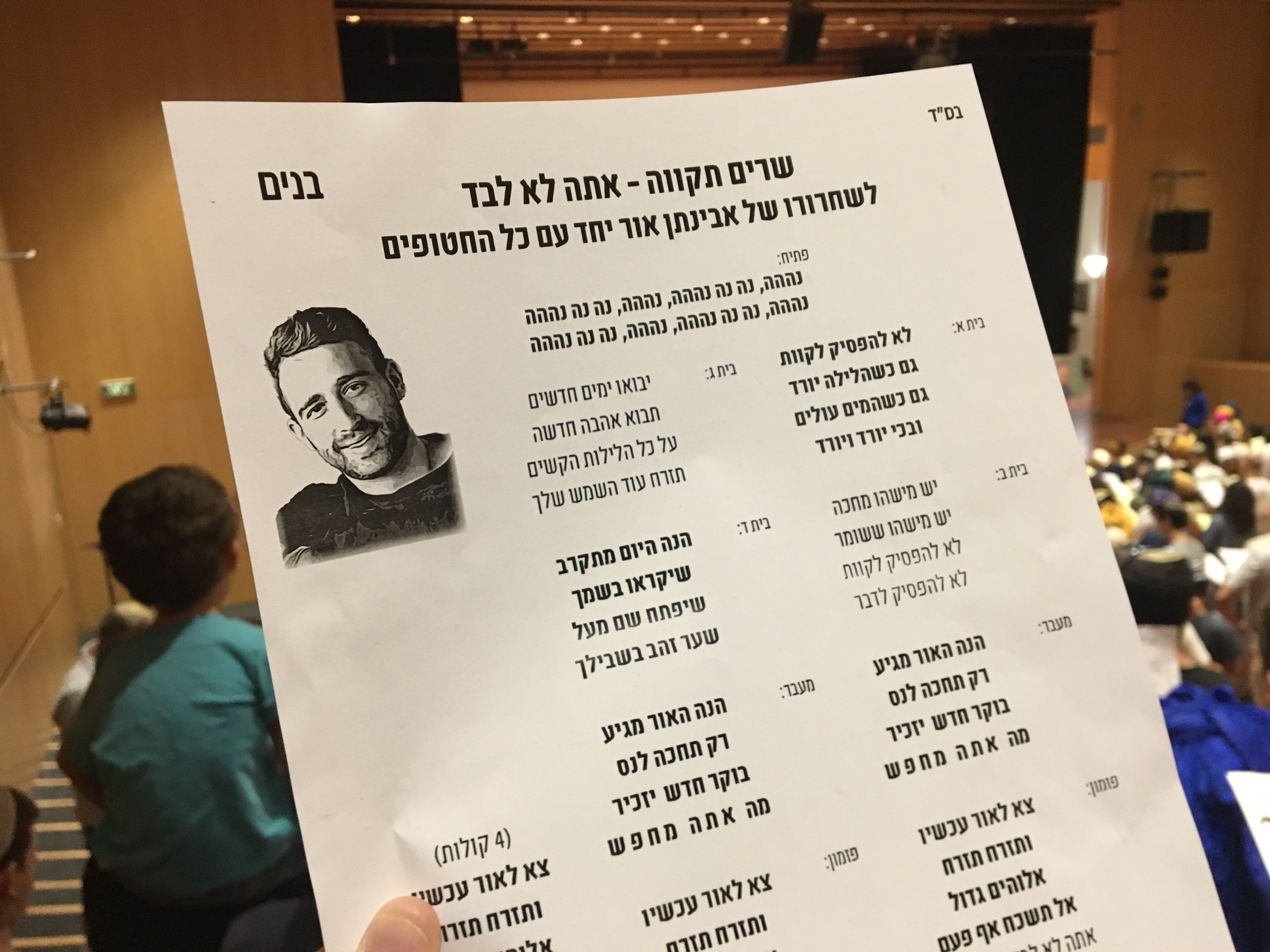
"Singing Hope" event held in the Tel Aviv Museum of Art to support those still held captive such as Avinatan Or in August 2024

Or's family spoke out for his release multiple times. His brother Moshe spoke to supporters in Hostages Square in August 2025 and demanded the Israeli government to negotiate for a deal to release all hostages. Moshe also mailed a video of himself speaking in Hebrew to the Al Jazeera network in April 2025, calling for Hamas to reach an agreement with Israel that would lead to the release of all hostages. He also requested for any information regarding his brother to be released. In a later interview with Ynet, Moshe stated Al Jazeera had reached out to him resulting in him recording the video, his disillusionment with both governments and that the family had raised NIS 250,000 ($67,846 USD) to pay for information if need.

Or's uncle Shimon Or also called for all hostages to be returned but stated a ceasefire wouldn't work as if Israel stopped fighting, Hamas would continue to build up weapons and armaments. Shimon argued that the IDF must control all of Gaza until the last hostage is released. Ditza Or, Or's mother belonged to the Tikva Forum which advocated that Israel's interests took precedence over those of the hostages or their family members. While she stated that there had been immense work done to support the hostages and their families through the Hostages Forum, she had followed the Jewish law of halachah or keeping a distance as she had a personal stake in the issue. Shortly after his release, Ditza spoke at The Future of Judea and Samaria conference in Jerusalem calling his release a "wondrous miracle" and that it was time to advance the national dream of Israel and "the fulfillment of Divine prophecy and the ultimate redemption of all humanity".

The personnel director of Nvidia's Israel employees, Gideon Rosenberg, campaigned for the release of Or. Rosenberg gathered Nvidia employees to offer support to Or's family and friends at marches and rallies. He also participated in marches, speeches, and printed T-shirts and signs to call for his return at Hostage Square in Tel Aviv and other locations.

Or's girlfriend, Argamani, who was abducted alongside him, was rescued by Israeli special forces on 8 June 2024, during Operation Arnon. After her release, she became a prominent public advocate for the remaining hostages, including Or. After a report in March 2025 by a released hostage that they had seen Or, Argamani posted to Instagram stating that "until Avinatan comes back, my heart is in captivity."

== Release ==
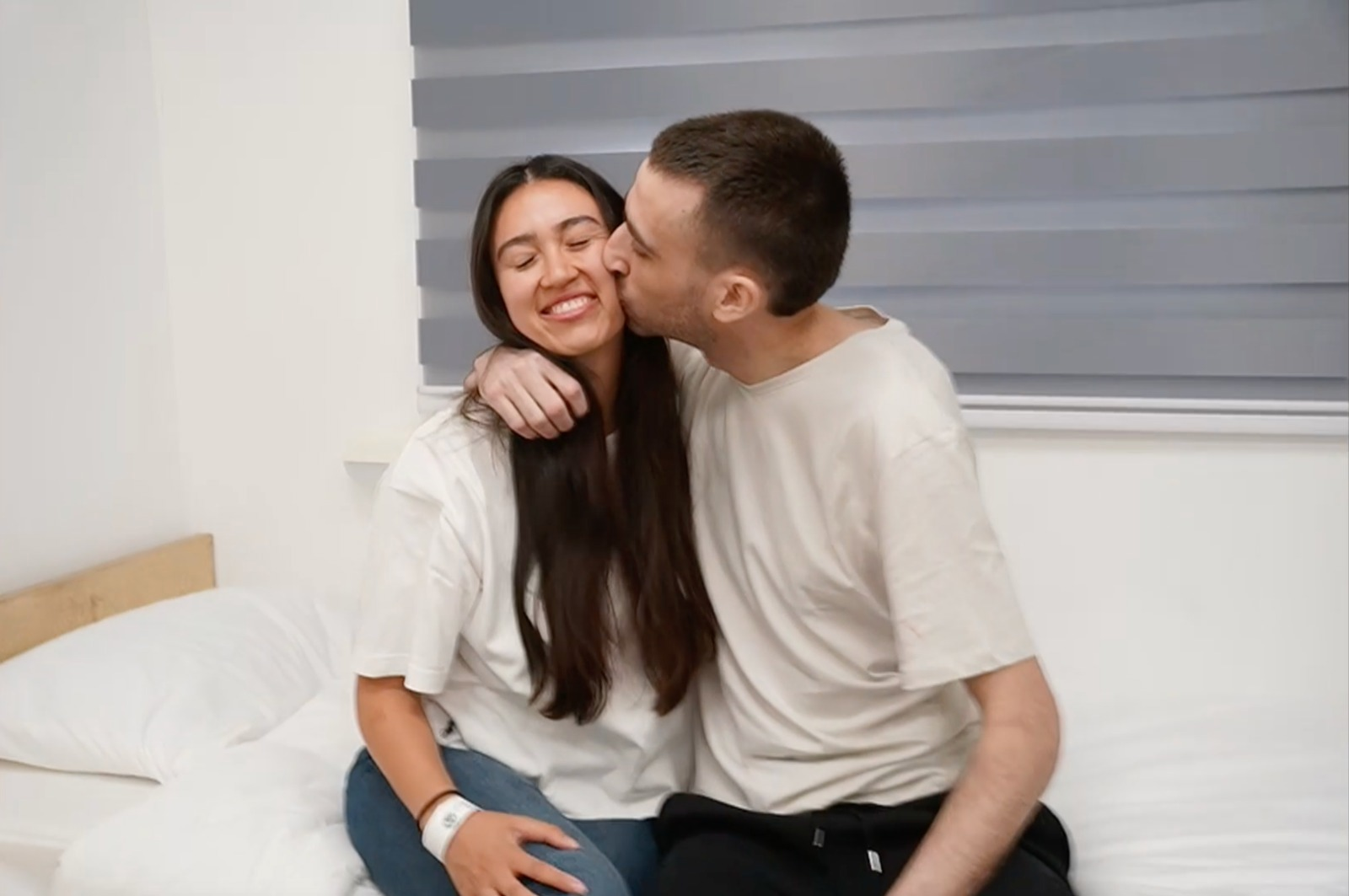
Avinatan Or reuniting with his girlfriend, Noa Argamani, following his release

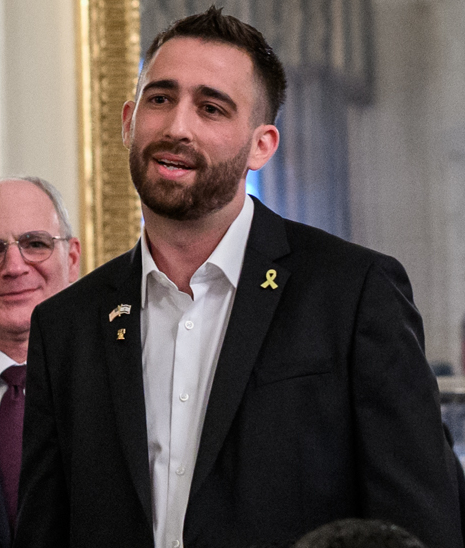
Or, after his release, at a November 2025 White House ceremony honoring some of the former hostages

On 13 October 2025, Or was freed together with the remaining 19 living Israeli hostages held in Gaza under the terms of the third hostage-prisoner exchange. The day after Or was released, his girlfriend Argamani posted about his release and included photos of the two of them shortly after his release, the two had been reunited at the Re'im crossing the day before. Eight days after his release, Or returned home to Shiloh and welcomed by a crowd of residents and well wishers.

== Retaliation ==
After Or's release, Israel announced that it had assassinated two of the militants involved in his abduction. Ahmad Abu Marhil was killed in an airstrike on 26 March 2025, followed by the assassination of Ahmad Ibrahim Rajab Shaar in a separate airstrike on 22 August 2025.

== Post release activities ==
Shortly after his release Or and his parents met with Prime Minister Benjamin Netanyahu and his wife Sara.

Argamani and Or spoke alongside released hostages Evyatar David and Guy Gilboa-Dalal spoke at the Jewish Federations of North America's opening ceremony in November 2025. In December 2025, Or and Argamani met with Jensen Huang the CEO of Nvidia in Santa Clara, California in a meeting set up by senior vice president and head of the Nvidia Israel development center, Amit Krig.

Or and his former girlfriend, Noa Argamani, met with American actress Sydney Sweeney during an event hosted by the StandWithUs organization in January 2026. The event was aimed to highlight and continue international support for former hostages and their experiences.

== See also ==
- List of Gaza war hostages
