= Nuseirat rescue and massacre =

2024 massacre and rescue operation in the Gaza war

Nuseirat hostage raid
- Part of the Gaza war
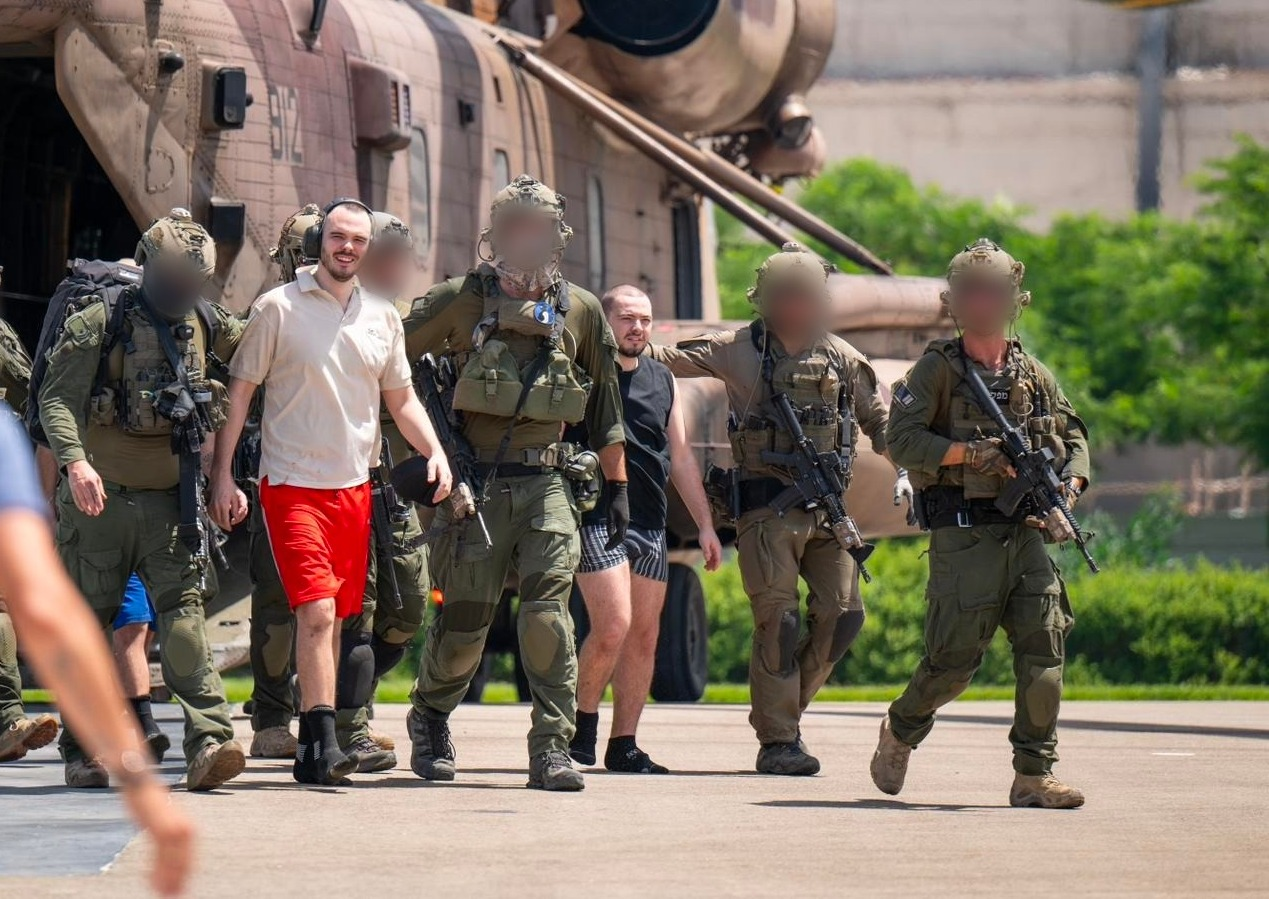
- The landing of the rescued hostages at Sheba Hospital
- Location: Nuseirat refugee camp, Gaza Strip, Palestine
- Objective: Rescue Israeli hostages held by Hamas
- Date: 8 June 2024
- Executed by: Yamam, Shin Bet, Israel Defense Forces
- Outcome: 276 Palestinians killed and 698+ injured; Four Israeli hostages rescued; One Yamam officer killed

On 8 June 2024, the Israel Defense Forces rescued four hostages from the Nuseirat refugee camp, and, during the operation, killed at least 276 Palestinians and injured over 698. (Note: The Israeli units involved with the operation included Yamam, the Shin Bet and Israel Defense Forces (IDF)) Due to the high death toll, some sources have referred to the operation as a massacre, and one of the largest massacres of the Gaza war.

During the operation, the Israeli military called in an intense air, sea, and ground attack. The operation successfully recovered four hostages taken during the October 7 attacks – Noa Argamani, Shlomi Ziv, Almog Meir Jan, and Andrey Kozlov—from two multi-story residential apartment buildings in Nuseirat, who were held there by Hamas. The operation also killed at least 276 Palestinians, including 64 children and 57 women, with at least 698 people reported injured, according to the Gaza Health Ministry. One Israeli officer was seriously injured and later died from his injuries. According to Hamas, Israel also killed three hostages during the operation, including one who was a dual Israeli-American citizen, during the operation. This was denied by Israel.

EU foreign policy chief Josep Borrell described the events as a "bloodbath." The OHCHR said that both Israeli forces and Palestinian armed groups may have committed war crimes.

== Background ==
The Nuseirat refugee camp was established in the Gaza Strip after the Palestinians were expelled or fled from Israel during the 1948 Palestine war. Israel began its occupation of the Gaza Strip in 1967, and since 2007, the area has been under Israeli air and naval blockade. On 7 October 2023, the Qassam Brigades (the militant wing of the Hamas party) launched an attack on Israel. As part of the attack, in which other Palestinian militant groups were also involved, Hamas, Palestinian Islamic Jihad and other Palestinian militant groups kidnapped 251 Israeli civilians and soldiers. This attack led to the Gaza war.

The Nuseirat refugee camp is a long-standing UNRWA refugee camp located in the middle of the Gaza Strip, in Deir al-Balah. The camp has been repeatedly bombed during the Israel-Hamas war, with over a hundred Palestinians killed in the attacks. The most recent attack on the camp occurred only days before the rescue operation, with IDF forces striking the UNRWA school in the camp, killing at least 33 people. The deceased classification are contested with Gaza sources reporting a number of women and children were in the death toll, while the IDF said the deceased included Hamas Nukhba and Palestinian Islamic Jihad militants.

This operation was the third known successful hostage rescue carried out by the IDF since the start of the war. IDF Corporal Ori Megidish was rescued in October 2023 from the northern part of the Gaza Strip, and two male hostages were rescued in February 2024 from southern Rafah. Additionally, a number of Israeli hostages and Palestinian prisoners were exchanged in 2023.

== Hostages ==
All four hostages rescued had been abducted from the Re'im music festival, and were identified as Noa Argamani (26-years-old), Almog Meir Jan (22-years-old), Andrey Kozlov (27-years-old), and Shlomi Ziv (41-years-old). Both Argamani and Meir Jan were festival goers while Kozlov, a recent immigrant from Russia, and Ziv had been employed as security guards for the festival.

Argamani was shown in one of the initial videos released by Hamas documenting the massacre. She was seen being taken away on a motorcycle while yelling, "Don't kill me!" Her arms are outstretched towards her boyfriend, Avinatan Or, who was also being kidnapped. This footage became emblematic of the hostage crisis, leading to Argamani being described as "the face of the Nova music festival hostages." Argamani's family had indications that she was alive, as she appeared in a Hamas video released in January 2024.

The abductees had suffered from malnutrition in captivity and were often beaten. The three male hostages, Shlomi Ziv, Almog Meir Jan, and Andrey Kozlov reported that they had gone through physical and psychological abuse while in Hamas captivity. Reports alleged that they were confined to a single dark room without any contact with the outside world for six months, and claimed that they faced severe punishments for non-compliance, such as being locked in a small bathroom or buried under blankets in intense heat. The doctor in charge of treatment for the rescued hostages said they were beaten and showed signs of malnutrition due to a lack of adequate food while in captivity. Itai Pesach at the Sheba Medical Centre who treated the three male hostages, stated that they suffered from severe trauma and had muscle atrophy due to malnutrition.

Argamani said she had been held in four different apartments during her eight months in captivity and that in the last location, the family made her wash their dishes. Ynet reported that she also cooked at times with basic ingredients she was provided.

The Qassam Brigades (the militant wing of the Hamas movement) claimed that three other hostages were killed as a result of the raid. They did not name any of them, or show photographs, but they claimed that one of the three was a US citizen and released a short video with text in Arabic, Hebrew, and English. The video depicted three unidentifiable corpses with their faces obscured by censor bars. The Brigades did not give details of how the hostages had died, but said they were killed by the Israeli military. (Note: Killed by the IDF directly, not executed in retaliation for civilian deaths, as threatened in early October.)

"In exchange for them, your own army killed 3 of your own captives in the same attack; one of them holds a USA citizenship" - Qassam Brigades, 9 June 2024.

== Rescue ==
The IDF said that they worked with Shin Bet and Israeli police to free the four Israeli hostages. It was also later reported that the operation was aided by intelligence support from the United States and the United Kingdom. The operation was planned for several weeks, and was carried out after an intelligence opportunity arose. Some of the special forces members entered the refugee camp in a vehicle with a mattress on top, posing as Palestinian refugees fleeing Rafah per Saudi reporters. They reportedly told locals that they were escaping the Israeli assault on Rafah, while other Palestinian locals alleged that other forces entered in humanitarian trucks. However, a senior official in the Biden administration stated that the Israeli forces did not use an aid truck.

Body camera footage from a Yamam officer during the rescue operation. Shows breaching area that the three male hostages were found in, and partial movement of hostages to secure zone.

The operation began at about 11 a.m., with the Yamam and Shin Bet officers raiding two multi-story buildings about 200 meters apart, in the center of Nusseirat, where the hostages were reportedly held in two family homes. During captivity the hostages were held in a civilian environment, guarded by armed militants. The female hostage, Argamani, was reportedly held separately from the three male hostages, who had been reportedly held together throughout their eight-month captivity. None of them were held in the Hamas tunnel network.

The IDF stated that, at the time of the rescue, the three male hostages were being held in the family home of Ahmed Al-Jamal, a physician. His son Abdullah Al-Jamal, a freelance journalist, was also in the household. Ramy Abdu, chairman of the Euro-Mediterranean Human Rights Monitor, reported that Ahmed Al-Jamal, Abdullah Al-Jamal, and the latter's wife were all killed after Israeli forces stormed the home by ladder. Al Jazeera disputed IDF allegations that Abdullah Al-Jamal had been one of its journalists, stating that he had contributed to an opinion piece published on its website but had no other involvement with the network. The Palestine Chronicle, a nonprofit online publication that Abdullah Al-Jamal had contributed to in the past, reported inconsistencies in the Israeli narrative. An investigation by The Wall Street Journal reported that the Al-Jamal family had been known for its close ties with and support of Hamas. Locals criticized Hamas for placing hostages in civilian areas.

During the extraction of the three male hostages, a major gun battle erupted, causing the mortal wounding of the commander of the Yamam rescue team for that building. During the operation, the Southern Command and the Air Force said they exchanged fire with Hamas militants. An IDF spokesman said its forces were fired upon inside buildings and during their withdrawal from Gaza. The three male hostages were extracted from the refugee camp, but the extraction vehicle became stuck and came under fire, leading additional forces to come to their rescue. They were then brought to a landing zone on the coast and airlifted into Israel. The abductees were not injured and were transferred to Sheba Medical Center.

A witness in the camp reported a "crazy bombardment" occurred suddenly, while another stated that the strike happened when people were sleeping. Witnesses reported that entire residential blocks were wiped out. A witness who had been in the marketplace stated that about 150 rockets fell at and around the market place in less than 10 minutes. Per a resident and paramedic in the camp, the assault felt like a "horror movie" and that Israeli drones and warplanes fired randomly throughout the night at peoples homes and those who tried to flee the area. Videos were posted to social media, reportedly showing corpses with entrails spilling out lying on blood-stained streets after the attack, although Reuters was unable to immediately verify the footage. Additional footage showed Palestinians in the market area diving for cover as missiles flew in and gunfire erupted.

The US denied that its Gaza floating pier (intended for the delivery of aid into Gaza) was used in the operation. The denial followed the release of imagery showing the landing zone used for the air evacuation immediately south along the coast from the pier, with the U.S. facility clearly visible in the near background.

== Bombing ==
=== Airstrikes ===
According to reports, "at least one of the [escape] vehicles" for ferrying the three male rescued hostages broke down, requiring additional forces to escape. Israeli forces henceforth called for additional support, "from the air, from the sea, and on the ground."

At 11:27 a.m., a strike occurred near the building from which the three male hostages were rescued. Subsequently, the building was demolished by another strike. Shortly before noon, another strike demolished the building where Noa Argamani had been held captive. Eyal Shahtout, a resident of a neighboring building, informed The New York Times that his home was hit, resulting in many of his family members being buried under the debris. 18 of his family members were killed, including his wife, four children, and two grandchildren. The Israeli military did not provide an explanation for why the home was targeted. To the south of the hostage sites, a market was also struck. At 11:45 a.m., plumes of smoke were visible in downtown Nuseirat.

Scores of local people, including children, were killed. According to a statement from Doctors without Borders, which works nearby at the Al-Aqsa Martyrs Hospital in Deir al-Balah, "there have been back-to-back mass casualties as densely populated areas are bombed. It's way beyond what anyone could deal with in a functional hospital, let alone with the scarce resources we have here." The Al-Awda Hospital in Nuseirat was also overwhelmed with casualties, "including many children laid out in the corridors". The strikes destroyed "apartment buildings throughout" [the] "camp, according to witnesses and video footage". The UN human rights office said that both Israeli forces and Palestinian armed groups may have committed war crimes, citing potential "violations of rules of proportionality, distinction and precaution" in the case of the former and "holding hostages in densely populated areas" for the latter.

== Casualties ==
The Gaza Health Ministry reported that 274 Palestinians were killed during the operation with around 700 wounded. The death toll included 64 children and 57 women. By contrast the IDF stated the number of casualties from the operation was “under 100.” Kenneth Roth writes that 44% of those killed were women and children, and given that the men were killed in the nearby market, it is likely that large number of the male casualties were civilians too.

Al-Aqsa hospital received 109 bodies of Palestinians, including 11 women and 23 children, along with "more than 100 wounded". Tanya Haj-Hassan, a paediatric intensive care doctor with Doctors Without Borders working at the hospital, described the scene as a "complete bloodbath." Another 100 people killed in the attacks were taken to al-Awda hospital. It is not known how many combatants are included in these counts. Ziad, a paramedic and resident of Nuseirat and Abu Obaida, a spokesperson for al-Qassam Brigades referred to the attack as a massacre, as did top EU diplomat Josep Borrell; the UN’s aid chief described "in graphic detail" scenes of "shredded bodies on the ground".

Obaida stated the operation resulted in the deaths of several other Israeli hostages, including one with US citizenship, IDF spokesman Peter Lerner dismissed the claim. The day after the operation, Hamas's armed wing uploaded a video to its Telegram channel appearing to show corpses of three hostages that were reportedly killed during the rescue operation. The faces of the corpses were obscured to prevent identification.

== International law ==
The UN human rights office said that both Israeli forces and Palestinian armed groups may have committed war crimes, citing potential "violations of rules of proportionality, distinction and precaution" in the case of the former and "holding hostages in densely populated areas" for the latter. The office added that by holding hostages in civilian areas, Hamas put "the lives of Palestinian civilians, as well as the hostages themselves, at added risk”. Israel denied the allegations against it.

Al-Haq called on the Prosecutor of the International Criminal Court to investigate the killings. Kenneth Roth agreed, stating that Israel has never investigated senior IDF officials for war crimes.

=== Proportionality ===
The rule of proportionality prohibits "Launching an attack which may be expected to cause incidental loss of civilian life, injury to civilians, damage to civilian objects, or a combination thereof, which would be excessive in relation to the concrete and direct military advantage anticipated."

Professor Ben Saul writes Israel launched the rescue operation knowing civilian casualties would be excessive. Adil Haque writes that the harm to civilians was foreseeable in advance of the operation. EMR also writes that the operation was launched with "despite prior knowledge of the presence of hundreds of civilians." Israeli military said it resorted to immense firepower after it got stuck. But Haque pointed to Israeli prior preparations, such as "air support ready to go" and "ground support ready to go", that indicated the Israelis had foreseen this situation.

Emanuel Gross of the University of Haifa writes that Israel had an obligation to release hostages, either through negotiation or force. Kenneth Roth questions why force is necessary for releasing hostages, pointing out through a prisoner exchange Israel was able to release more than 100 hostages, while rescue operations had only released 7. Roth acknowledges that negotiations had been slow, but blamed Netanyahu for that. Families of hostages have blamed Netanyahu for preventing a hostage deal. CIHRS also pointed out that a negotiated prisoner exchange between the two sides was done without any civilian casualties.

UN Human Rights experts said while it was legitimate to rescue four hostages, the violence used against civilians was "excessive". Tammy Caner of Tel Aviv University argues that the goal of freeing hostages was so significant to Israel, that the deaths of civilians in service of that goal were "not considered excessive". An article in +972 Magazine asked “How is it reasonable to kill over 200 people for the sake of four?", arguing that Palestinian lives were regarded as "cheap". Al-Haq wrote the sheer scale of civilian casualties indicates Israel had "a systemic policy that views Palestinian lives as expendable". Professor Brian L. Cox writes that observers typically don't “have access to the information that would be required to evaluate the doctrinal version of proportionality.”

Emanuel Gross of Haifa University stated that IHL was "created for wars between two nations, not a nation against a terror group", and thus the international community ought to change IHL for this sort of situation. Yuval Kaplinsky, former head of Israeli State Attorney, said such a case of a hostage rescue mission was unprecedented and therefore difficult to evaluate.

=== Distinction ===
Israeli IHL lawyer Michael Sfard said the high number of casualties raises the question whether Israeli forces conducted "random, indiscriminate use of bombardment in a very densely populated area". A UN spokesperson also said the law of distinction may have been violated. Oxfam said the killings appeared to be indiscriminate.

Witnesses interviewed by Al-Jazeera and CNN described the Israeli forces indiscriminately shooting at the civilian population during the attacks. One camp resident said Israeli soldiers summarily executed people on the street.

Al-Haq wrote that Israeli soldiers had deliberately targeted Palestinians in their homes. CNN interviewed the Miqdad family, who said Israeli soldiers entered their home and shot two of their children, killing one and severely wounding the other. Israeli soldiers also beat the men while interrogating them, and reportedly punched a child and forced him to strip. Israel later released a heavily edited video of the attack on the Miqdad house, but the video omitted what happened on the third floor, where the family says the Israeli attacks happened.

Israeli soldiers allegedly entered the area hiding in a humanitarian aid truck, though Israel denied the allegation.

An Al Jazeera documentary reported that some of the civilians were killed in areas are far from the site rescue operation, concluding they were attacked without military necessity.

== Aftermath ==
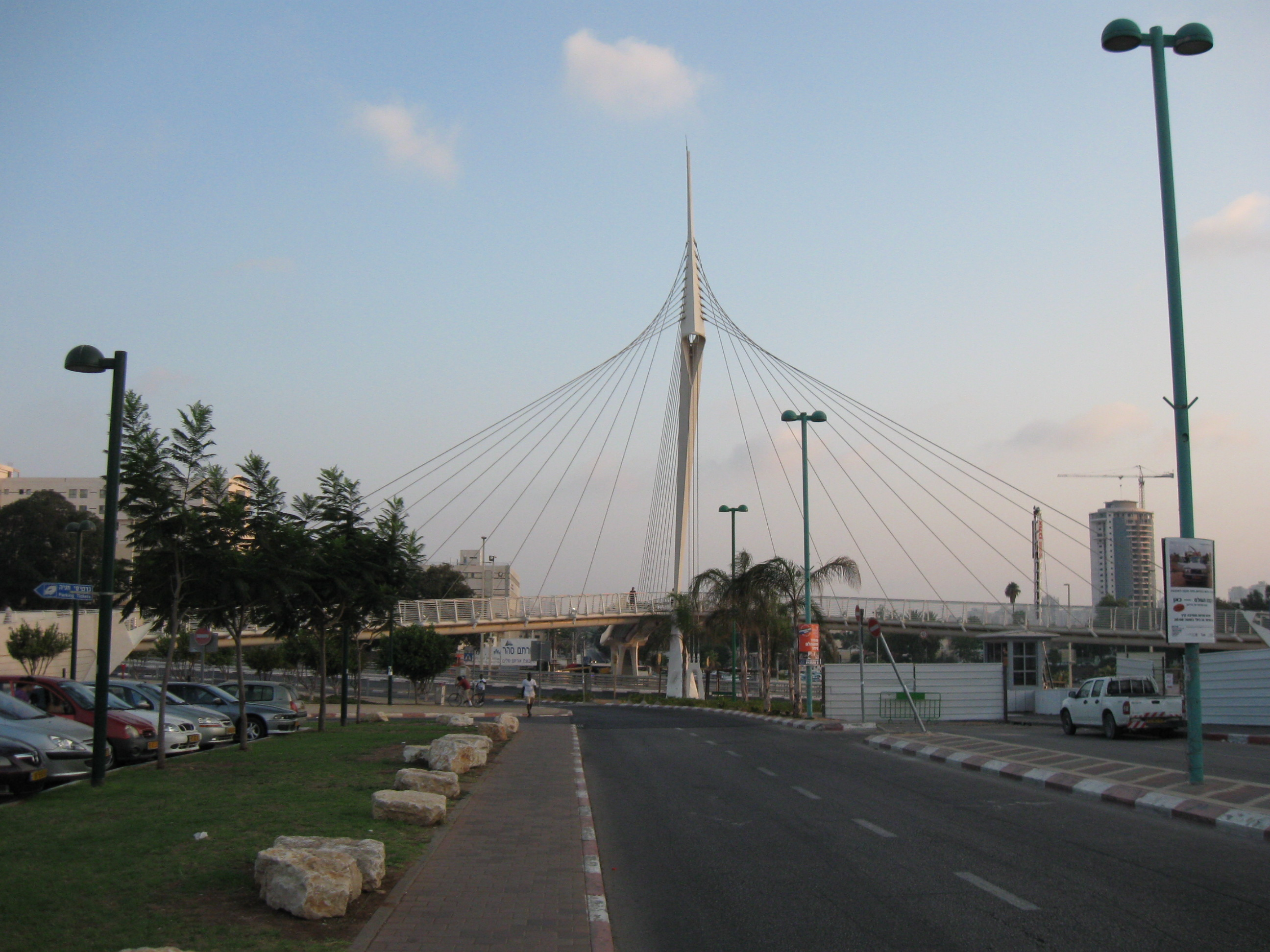
A pedestrian bridge in Petah Tikva renamed in honor of Arnon Zmora, the commander of the rescue operation who later died of his wounds.

Argamani was reunited with her father and transported to Sheba Medical Center to be reunited with her mother, where she was being treated for terminal brain cancer. Her father told reporters "Today is my birthday, and what a present I received". During a phone call with Argamani, Israeli Prime Minister Benjamin Netanyahu said that "we didn't give up on you for a moment." Her mother died less than a month later. The rescue operation, originally named "Seeds of Summer" was renamed as "Operation Arnon", in honor of Arnon Zmora, the commander of the rescue mission who later died of his wounds. A pedestrian bridge in Petah Tikva has also been renamed "Operation Arnon Bridge".

Arab Israeli actress and television presenter Lama Tatour was fired over an Instagram post questioning whether Argamani's seemingly healthy appearance justified the Palestinian civilian deaths in the operation, drawing Israeli criticism perceived as mocking a released hostage.

Israeli war cabinet member Benny Gantz postponed a scheduled news conference the night of the raid, which coincided with his deadline to resign if Prime Minister Benjamin Netanyahu did not present a new plan for the war. The following day, he resigned.

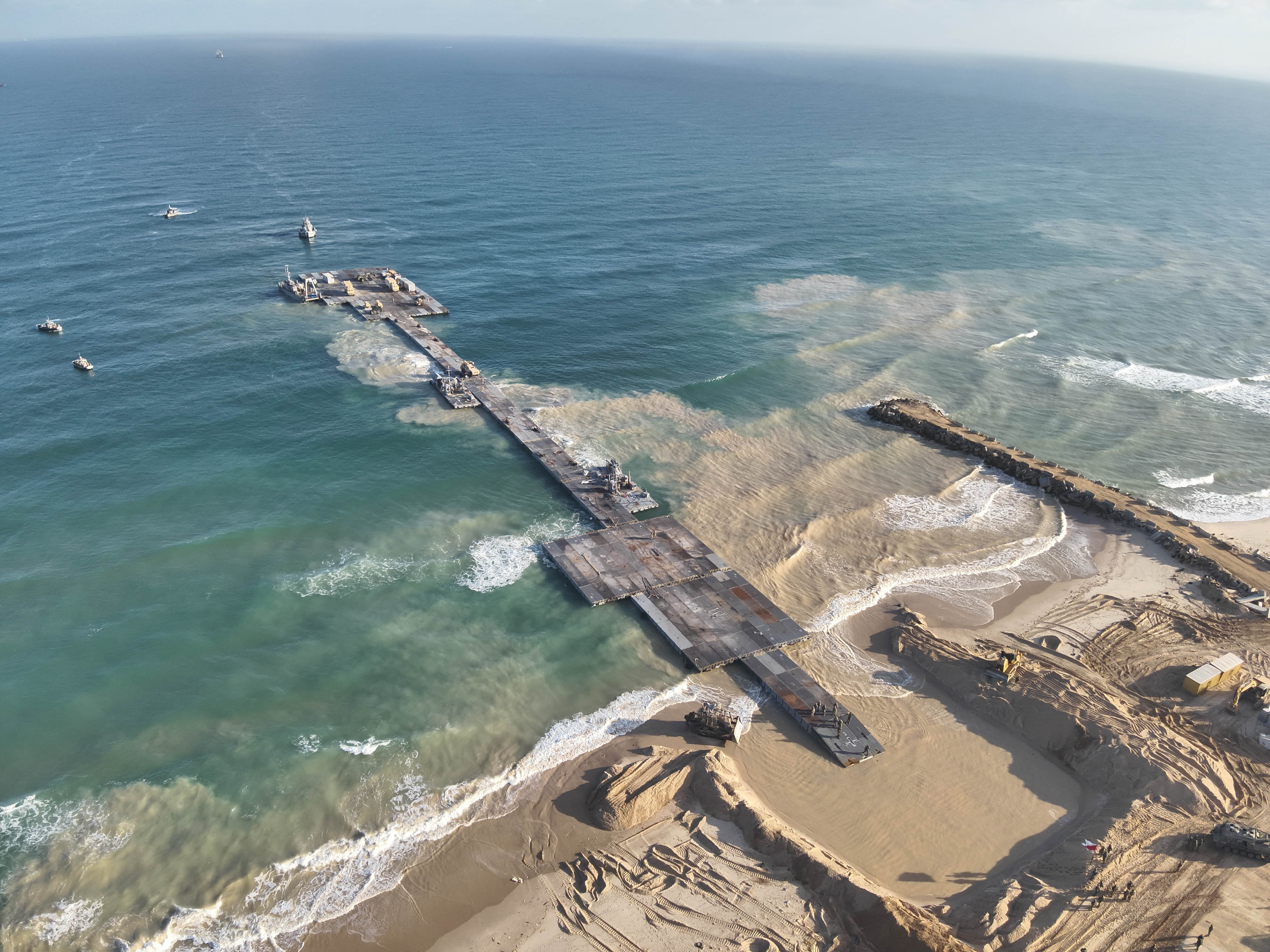
The U.S.-built Gaza floating pier, which was visible in footage of the hostage rescue

After a video showing the IDF helicopter carrying the rescued hostages taking off from a Gaza Strip beach with the floating pier constructed by the American military in the background, allegations began to circulate that the IDF used the pier for the rescue operation. United States officials stated that the pier was only used for humanitarian aid and the helicopter was used to return the hostages into Israel and had landed south of the pier but not within the cordoned off area. The U.S. had promised aid groups the pier would be a no-go area for Israeli forces and the UN put aid operations at the pier on hold while it investigated whether the Israeli usage, real or apparent, of the pier facilities and the perception of that by Palestinians, mitigated against continued engagement at the pier. Oxfam and other aid organizations said they were waiting for answers from the U.S. government. Aid deliveries at the pier resumed on 19 June 2024, but aid agencies did not resume distribution. The pier was removed due to bad weather on 28 June 2024.

In late September 2025, Israel announced that it had killed Muhammad Ahmad Yousef al-Jamal in an airstrike a few weeks prior to the announcement. al-Jamal was one of the Hamas operatives who was guarding the three male hostages who were rescued, and the one who killed Zmora during the rescue operation.

== Reactions ==
=== Domestic ===
- Hamas issued a press release on 8 June calling the actions of the IDF and Israeli military a "horrible massacre against innocent civilians." Hamas leader Ismail Haniyeh said that "resistance will continue", adding, "If the occupation believes that it can impose its choices on us by force, then it is delusional." The group's military wing spokesperson, Abu Obaida, stated in a press release that: "The operation will pose a great danger to the enemy prisoners and will have a negative impact on their conditions and lives."
- Palestine: Palestinian president Mahmoud Abbas described the rescue operation as a "massacre." The day after the operation, Abbas instructed the Palestinian envoy to the United Nations to request an emergency session with the United Nations Security Council to discuss the repercussions of the operation and resulting deaths.
- Israel: Israeli Prime Minister Benjamin Netanyahu said, "We are committed to do so in the future as well. We will not let up until we complete the mission and return home all the hostages — both those alive and dead." Defense Minister Yoav Gallant said the operation was "daring in nature, planned brilliantly, and executed in an extraordinary fashion."
  - According to the IDF, Hamas pays Palestinian families to hold the hostages in their houses, which may account for the high casualties. In addition, a large firefight occurred as IDF special forces were attempting to extract the hostages, reportedly coming under fire from dozens of militants with RPGs and machine guns when their vehicle became stuck. The IDF then called in airstrikes to cover their evacuation.
  - The family members of those still held as hostages repeated their demands for a ceasefire after the news of the rescue operation. The daughter-in-law of one of the hostages stated that "The hostages don't have time. We can't free everyone in operations and we must go for a deal that will save lives." A member of the health team at the Hostages and Missing Families Forum, stated such operations were not a way to bring back all of the remaining hostages - deceased or living - but instead focus should be a ceasefire.

=== International ===
- Argentina: Argentine President Javier Milei celebrated the release of the four hostages on Twitter, posting "Long live freedom, damn it!"
- Austria: Austrian Chancellor Karl Nehammer expressed being "very much relieved," but emphasized, "far too many are still being brutally held hostage by Hamas. All of them need to be released immediately." He also pledged to continue "all efforts" to secure the release of hostage Tal Shoham, who holds Austrian citizenship.
- Cuba: Foreign minister Bruno Rodriguez stated, "We condemn in the strongest terms the massacre carried out by the Israeli army in the Nuseirat refugee camp, Gaza."
- Egypt: the country denounced the killing of civilians, calling it "a flagrant violation of all rules of international law".
- France: President Emmanuel Macron Macron praised the hostage rescue and called for a lasting political solution to the war in Gaza.
- Germany: Chancellor Olaf Scholz wrote that the rescue of the hostages was an "important sign of hope", adding that "four hostages are now free. Hamas must finally release all hostages. The war must end".
- Indonesia: the country condemned the "repeated atrocities" committed by Israel in Gaza, including in the Nuseirat refugee camp, and called for an immediate ceasefire.
- Jordan: the country denounced the killing of civilians and called "on the international community and especially the Security Council to take immediate and urgent action to stop Israel's war crimes in Gaza."
- Kuwait: the country denounced the killing of civilians, calling it a "heinous crime".
- Lebanon: The Lebanese Ministry of Foreign Affairs called the operation a massacre.
- Norway: Deputy Foreign Minister Andreas Motzfeldt Kravik condemned the attack on civilians and called for the release of all hostages.
- Poland: Foreign Minister Radosław Sikorski wrote: "Bravo, IDF. May all hostages return home and may there be a just peace between Israel and Palestine".
- Turkey: the country denounced the killing of civilians, calling it a "barbaric attack".
- United Kingdom: Prime Minister Rishi Sunak wrote that "It is a huge relief to see hostages returned after their unimaginable ordeal and heartwarming to see the pictures of them reunited with their families. We will continue to strive towards an end to the fighting as well as safety and security for all."
- United States: United States President Joe Biden lauded the rescue of the hostages, and pledges to "not stop working" until all the hostages are freed.

=== Organizations ===
- United Nations: UN Secretary General António Guterres stated that he had sent messages to the families of rescued hostages Noa Argamani and Shalomi Ziv, to express his "relief that they and two other hostages are now free." Guterres added, "I renew my appeal for the immediate and unconditional release of all hostages and for an end to this war." Balakrishnan Rajagopal, the UN Special Rapporteur on the right to housing, said that "Countries that celebrate the release of four Israeli hostages without saying a word about the hundreds of Palestinians killed and thousands held in arbitrary detention by Israel, have lost moral credibility for generations and don’t deserve to be on any U.N. human rights body."
- European Union: A top European Union diplomat Josep Borrell condemned the level of casualties in the Nuseirat refugee camp as a result of the rescue, calling it "...another massacre of civilians". He also called for a ceasefire and the release of all remaining hostages.
- Hezbollah: In response to the operation, the Iranian-backed group launched attacks against northern Israel, stating that: "this targeting came in support of our steadfast Palestinian people in the Gaza Strip and in support of their brave and honorable resistance, and in response to the Israeli enemy's attacks".
- Gulf Cooperation Council: Secretary-General Jassem Mohamed Albudaiwi described the operation as a "terrorist crime that targeted unarmed civilians with unprecedented barbarism."

=== Humanitarian aid groups ===
- The Palestine Red Crescent Society denounced the use of a humanitarian aid truck as a disguise for military operations, labeling it as a "violation of international humanitarian and customary law" and noting that such actions constitute perfidy, which is considered a war crime.
- The Doctors Without Borders coordinator in Gaza asked, "How many more men, women and children have to be killed before world leaders decide to put an end to this massacre?" According to Dr. Tanya Haj-Hassan, a Doctors Without Border pediatrician, colleagues in the emergency department at Al-Asqa hospital described the situation by "repeating the word massacre, massacre, massacre over and over again."
- Oxfam called the attack a "horrifying" massacre and an "unacceptable and unconscionable price to pay".

=== Other ===
- Saul Takahashi, a professor at Osaka Jogakuin University and a former deputy for the UN High Commissioner for Human Rights, stated, "The claim that the Israeli attack on Nuseirat camp was justified is completely ignorant of international law. Israel has shown itself time and time again that it does not care about international and humanitarian laws."
- Kenneth Roth, the former director of Human Rights Watch and a professor at Princeton University, stated the attack was "inconsistent with the duty to take all feasible precautions to spare civilians harm."

== See also ==
- Rescue of Ori Megidish
- Operation Golden Hand
- Operation Entebbe
- December 2024 Nuseirat refugee camp attack
