= Noa Argamani =

Israeli hostage taken by Hamas in 2023

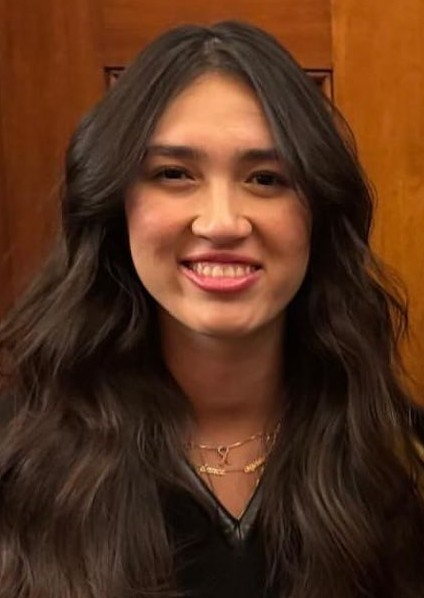
- Noa Argamani in March 2025
- Born: 12 October 1997 (age 29); Beer Sheva, Israel

Noa Argamani (Hebrew: נועה ארגמני; born 12 October 1997) is an Israeli woman who was abducted by Hamas during the Re'im music festival massacre as part of the October 7 attacks. In one of the first Hamas videos released of the massacre, she was seen being taken away on a motorcycle as she yelled, "Don't kill me!" Her arms were outstretched toward her then-boyfriend Avinatan Or, who was also kidnapped. The footage of her kidnapping became a symbol of the hostage crisis and led to Argamani being described as "the face of the Nova music festival hostages".

In March 2024, Argamani's Chinese-born mother Liora, who was suffering from late-stage brain cancer, made a public plea to see her daughter one last time. She urged US President Joe Biden to help secure her daughter's release. The family had indications that Argamani was still alive, as she had appeared in a Hamas video released in January 2024.

On June 8, 2024, after 245 days in captivity, Argamani and three other hostages were rescued from Gaza in a joint operation by the Israel Defense Forces, Shin Bet, and the Israel Police. She was subsequently reunited with her family, three weeks prior to her mother's death.

After her rescue, she became a prominent activist for the hostages who remained held in Gaza. She was named by Time magazine's listed her as one of the world's 100 most influential people in 2025.

== Early life ==
Argamani was born in Beer Sheva, Israel on 12 October 1997 to Yaakov and Liora Argamani. (Note: Reports published immediately after Argamani's abduction saying that she was born in Beijing were false.) She is their only child. Argamani's mother, Liora (née Li Chunhong), was originally from Wuhan, China, and was formerly a Chinese national prior to naturalizing as an Israeli citizen. During her compulsory military service, the younger Argamani served in the Israeli Navy. Prior to her abduction, she studied information systems and software engineering and at Ben Gurion University where she met her boyfriend of two years, Avinatan Or.

== Kidnapping ==
A still image from a bodycam worn by one of the kidnappers showing Noa Argamani being taken hostage by Hamas

On October 7, 2023, as part of the initial incursion of the 2023 Israel-Hamas war, Hamas militants crossed from the Gaza Strip into Israel and attacked the Supernova (Nova) Sukkot Gathering music festival, an open-air music festival in the western Negev desert. Argamani was attending the festival with her boyfriend Avinatan Or and was shown along with Or being captured by Hamas militants in a viral video. The Israeli government "condemned the video as psychological warfare propaganda." Her friend, Amit Parparia, indicated that they did not want to believe the video depicted Argamani and Or, but could not deny it as "Its just her face, her clothes and it's her boyfriend."

In the video, Argamani can be heard screaming "Don't kill me! No, no, no!" while being forced onto a motorcycle by members of Hamas. The video also shows Or being restrained by two other men. Or's brother, Moshe, reportedly learned of the video by emergency teams and viewed it before giving his approval for the media to publish it. An additional video of her abduction was released in April 2024, which showed her being forced onto the motorcycle and restrained with her head covered with a black bag. Argamani has been seen in a later footage that appears to show her drinking water in a room in Gaza.

Allegations were raised during an NBC report that Argamani was not abducted by Hamas forces but instead by a mob of Palestinian civilians from Gaza. This theory was posited by anonymous sources claiming to be Israeli military officials, stated that their reasoning was based on the fact that those filmed abducting Argamani wore no official uniforms and she appeared to have been abducted several hours after the attack.

=== Videos released from captivity ===
Still image from video released by Hamas
- Click here for image

On January 14, 2024, Hamas released a video showing Argamani and two male hostages asking Israel to bring them home. The next day, Hamas released another video showing Argamani stating that the two male hostages had been killed in Israeli airstrikes. After her rescue, Argamani said she was held captive with Yossi Sharabi and Itay Svirsky.

On May 31, 2024, Hamas released a video featuring the voice of Argamani.

== Media coverage and efforts to release ==
Argamani's abduction was featured on the front page of the October 8 edition of UK's Mail on Sunday. News of Argamani's abduction and her ties to China have been widely reported by international and Chinese media. Her mother Liora appealed to the Chinese embassy for help in freeing her daughter. Argamani's father Yaakov reportedly indicated that he did not approve of violence to get his daughter freed, saying: "They also have mothers who are crying. The same as it is for us."

Israeli Prime Minister Benjamin Netanyahu appealed to Chinese Ambassador Cai Run for Chinese President Xi Jinping to intervene to secure the release of Argamani. After Argamani's rescue, it was revealed that the Chinese government refused to provide assistance because Argamani's mother renounced her Chinese citizenship, as China does not allow dual citizenship.

In March 2024, Argamani's mother, while suffering from terminal brain cancer, implored United States President Joe Biden to intervene and help bring her daughter home.

Image of the manga booklet about Noa Argamani's life
- Click here for image

In May 2024, two weeks prior to Argamani's rescue, Japanese manga artist, Makoto Tanaka, release a booklet featuring Argamani's life story. Tanaka titled the booklet "Bring them home" (in English). The unveiling of the booklet was done at the Israeli Embassy in Tokyo marking the 76th anniversary of Israel's independence, with Argamani's father in attendance.

== Rescue ==
At around 11 a.m. on June 8, 2024, Argamani and three other hostages were rescued from two houses in the Nuseirat refugee camp in Gaza, where they were being held by Hamas militants. The Israel Defence Forces, Shin Bet, and the Israel Police jointly carried out the rescue operation, after which the hostages were transported by helicopter to Sheba Medical Center for examination. The hostages were initially reported to be in good medical condition, but subsequent reports cited medical professionals' findings that they were malnourished.

Argamani's rescue coincided with the birthday of her father, Yaakov Argamani. He commented, "What a present I received ... there’s no army like this in the world." The video of their reunion was widely viewed on social media. She spoke with president Isaac Herzog and prime minister Benjamin Netanyahu upon her return to Israel; Netanyahu told her that "we didn't give up on you for a moment." She was then transferred to Tel Aviv Sourasky Medical Center to visit her mother, Liora Argamani, who was being treated there for terminal brain cancer. The facility's CEO described her mother's condition as "complicated and tough" but said he believed that mother and daughter had been able to communicate.

Argamani was discharged from the hospital on June 11, three days after her rescue. Upon her release, she visited with Ditza Or, the mother of her boyfriend whom she had never previously met. Argamani's boyfriend continued to be held hostage.

=== Post-rescue description of life as a hostage ===
Describing her experience as a hostage, Argamani told medical teams that she had not been held in the tunnels beneath Gaza; instead, she had been moved among four different apartments. The mother of another hostage claimed that Argamani told her that she and some of the other female hostages were "held as slaves in a luxury villa": "They cleaned the yard, did dishes and prepared food that they were not allowed to eat." At her last apartment belonging to the Abu Nar family, where she was held under armed guard, she had occasionally been allowed to go outside, after not seeing "daylight" for 245 days, disguised as a Palestinian woman, but was rarely permitted to shower. She also said that she feared that every night could be her last night.

She had learned some Arabic during her time in captivity and had acted as a spokeswoman for other female hostages, who were released during a truce in November 2023.

On August 23, Argamani took to social media to say that she sustained injuries in an Israeli airstrike during her captivity, and to deny false reports in some Israeli media that Hamas operatives had beaten her or shaved her hair.

== Post-rescue activities and activism ==
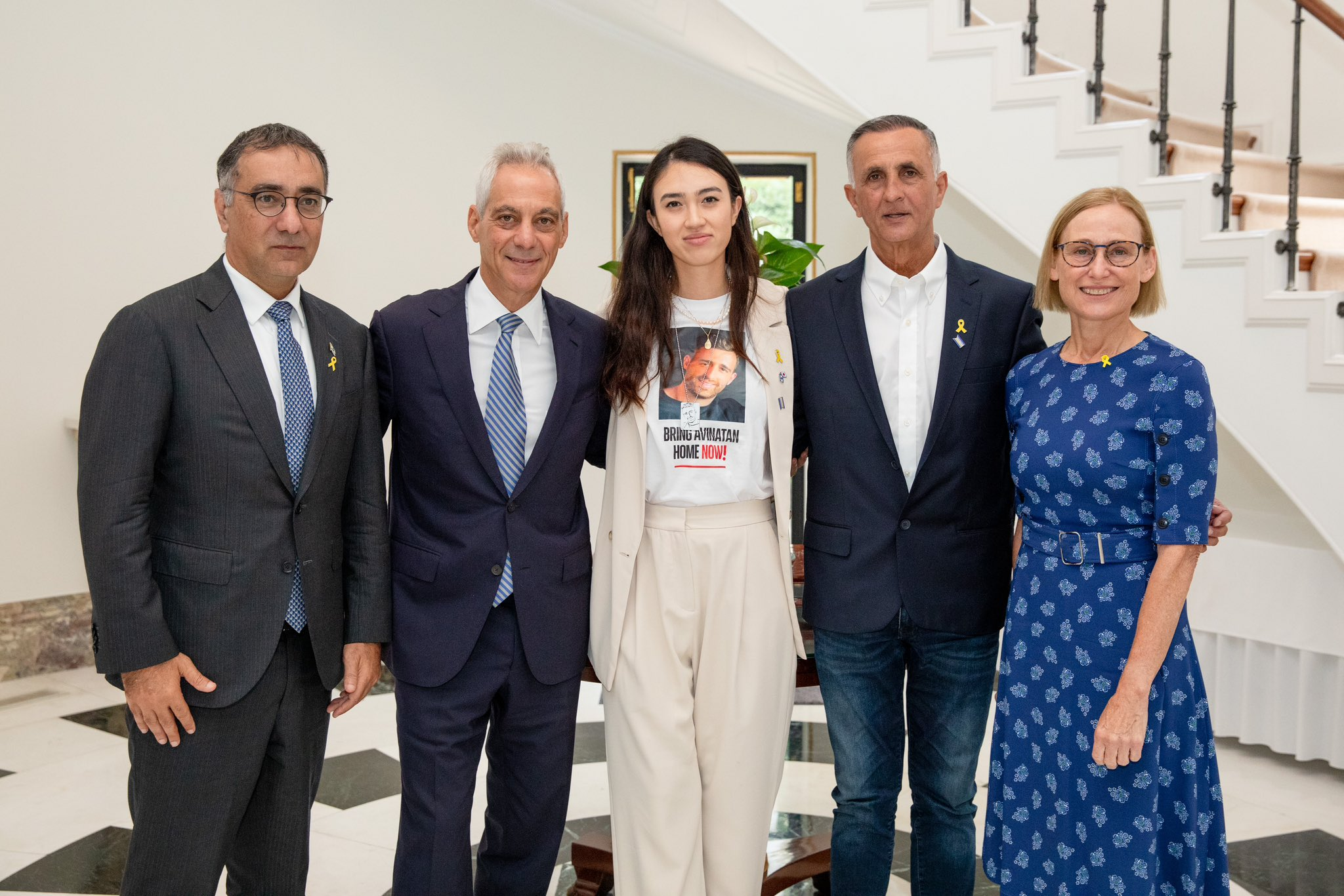
Argamani visiting with Rahm Emanuel, United States ambassador to Japan, August 2024. Left to right: Gilad Cohen (Israel's ambassador to Japan), Emanuel, Argamani, Argamani's father, Emanuel's wife Amy Rule.

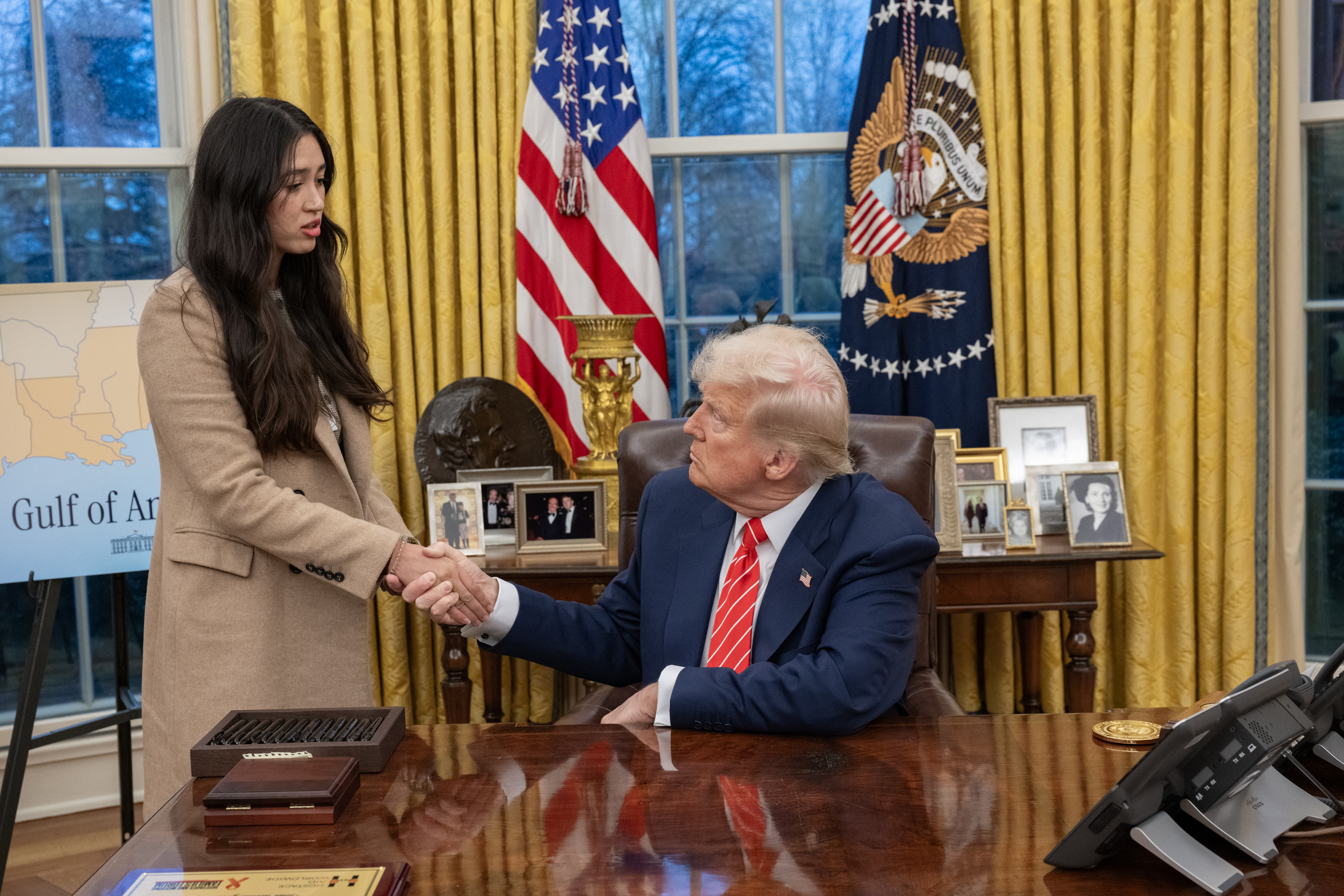
Noa Argamani meeting with President Donald Trump in the Oval Office, March 2025

Noa Argamani's mother, Liora, died three weeks after the rescue, allowing Liora to have her dying wish "to see her daughter one last time" be fulfilled.

On July 24, 2024, Argamani and her father were guests of Benjamin Netanyahu during his address to a joint session of the U.S. Congress. Netanyahu recognized Argamani during his speech, and she was received with a standing ovation. Argamani was criticized for joining Netanyahu, but Netanyahu defended her decision to be his guest.

A couple of days after the address to Congress, Argamani and her father went to Cambria Heights, Queens to visit the Ohel, the tomb of Rabbi Menachem Mendel Schneerson, where they prayed for the return of the rest of the hostages. In November 2023, her father had prayed for her safe return at the same venue, while she was being held hostage.

In August 2024, she traveled with her father to Tokyo where she met with diplomats from G7 countries in order to promote the plight of the hostages still held by Hamas. After some of her comments were taken out of context by Israeli media, Argamani stated on social media that she had sustained injuries from a wall collapsing due to Israeli military airstrikes and that Hamas had not beaten her or shaved her hair. In the same month, she was filmed dancing in a yellow bikini at a summer party to celebrate her rescue. This attracted some criticism on social media.

In January 2025, Argamani, along with relatives of hostages that remained held in Hamas captivity, met with four members of the U.S. Congress: Sen. Dave McCormick (R-Pa.), Reps. Michael McCaul (R-Texas), Addison McDowell (R-N.C.), and August Pfluger (R-Texas) in an effort to promote the release of the hostages left behind, including her boyfriend, Avinatan Or. A week later, Argamani made an appearance alongside Sara Netanyahu at the Nova music festival massacre traveling exhibition in Miami. In her appearance, Argamani recounted her experience of being kidnapped and held hostage. Argamani made a second public appearance at the exhibition in February 2025, this time alongside special envoy Steve Witkoff who pledged to continue working for the release of all the hostages still held by Hamas.

During U.S. President Donald Trump's Second Inaugural Parade, Argamani stood directly behind Trump on stage after Trump invited released hostages and hostages families in attendance to the stage. The group remained on stage for the remainder of the speech.

On February 25, 2025, Argamani spoke in front of the United Nations Security Council, recounting her experience as a hostage, and promoting a continuation of the 2025 Gaza war ceasefire until all the hostages are released. She was the first released hostages to speak in front of the UNSC.

In March 2025, Argamani was invited by Speaker of the House Mike Johnson to attend Donald Trump's 2025 speech to a joint session of Congress. The next day, she was part of a delegation of former hostages who met President Trump in the White House to urge him to continue to work towards the release of the remaining hostages. In 2025, Time magazine listed her as one of the world's 100 most influential people. Argamani was the first honoree at the 2025 TIME100 Summit and Gala to deliver a speech. After her speech, Time's Editor-in-chief, Sam Jacobs, called Argamani "a powerful voice for freedom around the world."

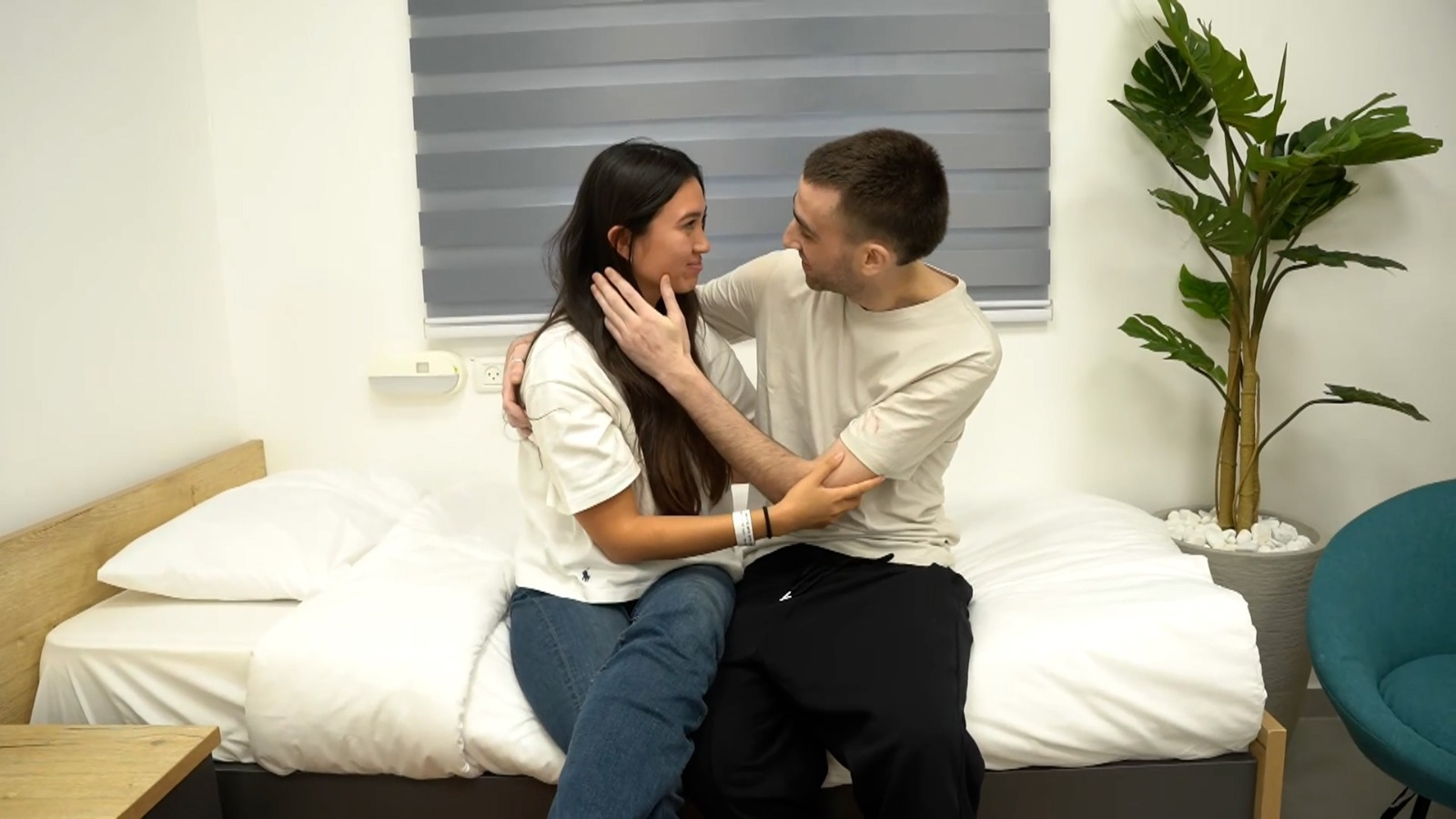
The first reunion between released hostage Avinatan Or and his partner, former hostage Noa Argamani, October 13, 2025.

She was reunited with her former boyfriend, Avinatan Or, who was kidnapped with her, when he was released on October 13, 2025 as part of the Gaza peace plan. In November 2025, Argamani and Or were among the 26 former hostages who met with President Donald Trump at the White House.

Argamani announced in September 2026 that she had accepted a position at Vine Ventures, a venture capital firm, assisting in the expansion of Israeli start ups to the US.

== See also ==
- List of Gaza war hostages
