= Michael McCaul =

American politician (born 1962)

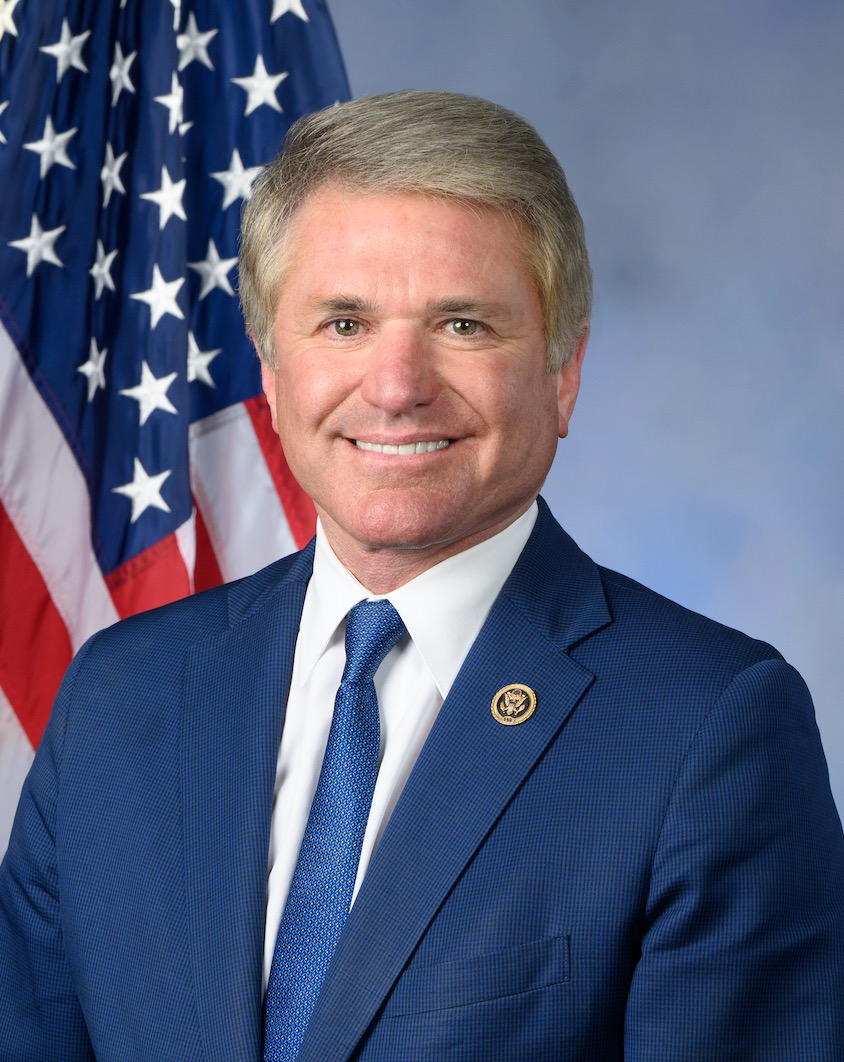
- Official portrait, 2023

Chair of the House Foreign Affairs Committee
- In office January 3, 2023 – January 3, 2025
- Preceded by: Gregory Meeks
- Succeeded by: Brian Mast

Ranking Member of the House Foreign Affairs Committee
- In office January 3, 2019 – January 3, 2023
- Preceded by: Eliot Engel
- Succeeded by: Gregory Meeks

Chair of the House Homeland Security Committee
- In office January 3, 2013 – January 3, 2019
- Preceded by: Peter King
- Succeeded by: Bennie Thompson

Member of the U.S. House of Representatives from Texas's 10th district
- Incumbent
- Assumed office January 3, 2005
- Preceded by: Lloyd Doggett

Personal details
- Born: Michael Thomas McCaul Sr. January 14, 1962 (age 64) Dallas, Texas, U.S.
- Party: Republican
- Spouse: Linda Mays
- Children: 5
- Relatives: Lowry Mays (father-in-law)
- Education: Trinity University (BA); St. Mary's University, Texas (JD)
- Website: House website Campaign website
- McCaul's voice McCaul supporting a bipartisan bill to strengthen AUKUS. Recorded March 22, 2023

Michael Thomas McCaul Sr. (born January 14, 1962) is an American politician, attorney, and a member of the U.S. House of Representatives for Texas's 10th congressional district since 2005. A member of the Republican Party, he chaired the House Committee on Homeland Security during the 113th, 114th, and 115th Congresses. His district includes both Austin to Houston.

McCaul became the chair of the House Foreign Affairs Committee in the 118th Congress in 2023.

On September 14, 2025, McCaul announced he would not be seeking re-election in 2026.

== Early life, education, and legal career ==
Born in Dallas, the son of Frances Jane (Lott) and James Addington McCaul, Jr., McCaul has English, Irish, and German ancestry. He graduated from Jesuit College Preparatory School of Dallas and earned a Bachelor of Arts in history from San Antonio's Trinity University in 1984 and a Juris Doctor from St. Mary's University three years later. McCaul also completed a Senior Executive Fellowship at Harvard Kennedy School.

McCaul worked as an attorney and federal prosecutor before entering politics. He was the Chief of Counterterrorism and National Security for Texas's branch of the US Attorney's office, and also worked under the Department of Justice's Public Integrity Section. After he left, McCaul took a position as a Deputy Attorney General in 1999 with the Texas Attorney General's Office and served in this capacity until 2002.

== U.S. House of Representatives ==
=== Elections ===
McCaul first ran for the U.S. House of Representatives in 2004 and won a crowded Republican primary in the newly created 10th District. The district, which included part of Austin, the western part of Harris County and several rural counties in between, was thought to be so heavily Republican that no Democratic candidate even filed, effectively handing him the seat.

In 2006 he defeated Democratic nominee Ted Ankrum and former Libertarian presidential candidate Michael Badnarik with 55% of the vote. McCaul was reelected again in 2008, against Democratic candidate Larry Joe Doherty and Libertarian candidate Matt Finkel, 54% to 43%.

Four years later, he was reelected to a fourth term with 76% of the vote against Ankrum (22%) and Libertarian candidate Jeremiah "JP" Perkins (1%). McCaul won a seventh term in 2016 with 179,221 votes (57.3%) to Democratic nominee Tawana W. Cadien's 120,170 (38.4%). Libertarian Bill Kelsey received 13,209 (4.2%).

In 2018, McCaul won an eighth term in the House with 157,166 votes (51.1%) to Democratic nominee Mike Siegel's 144,034 (46.8%) and Libertarian Mike Ryan's 6,627 votes (2.5%). It was the closest race of McCaul's career.

He was elected to a ninth term in 2020, defeating Siegel again.

On 14 September 2025, he announced he would not be seeking reelection.

=== Political positions ===
==== Cybersecurity ====
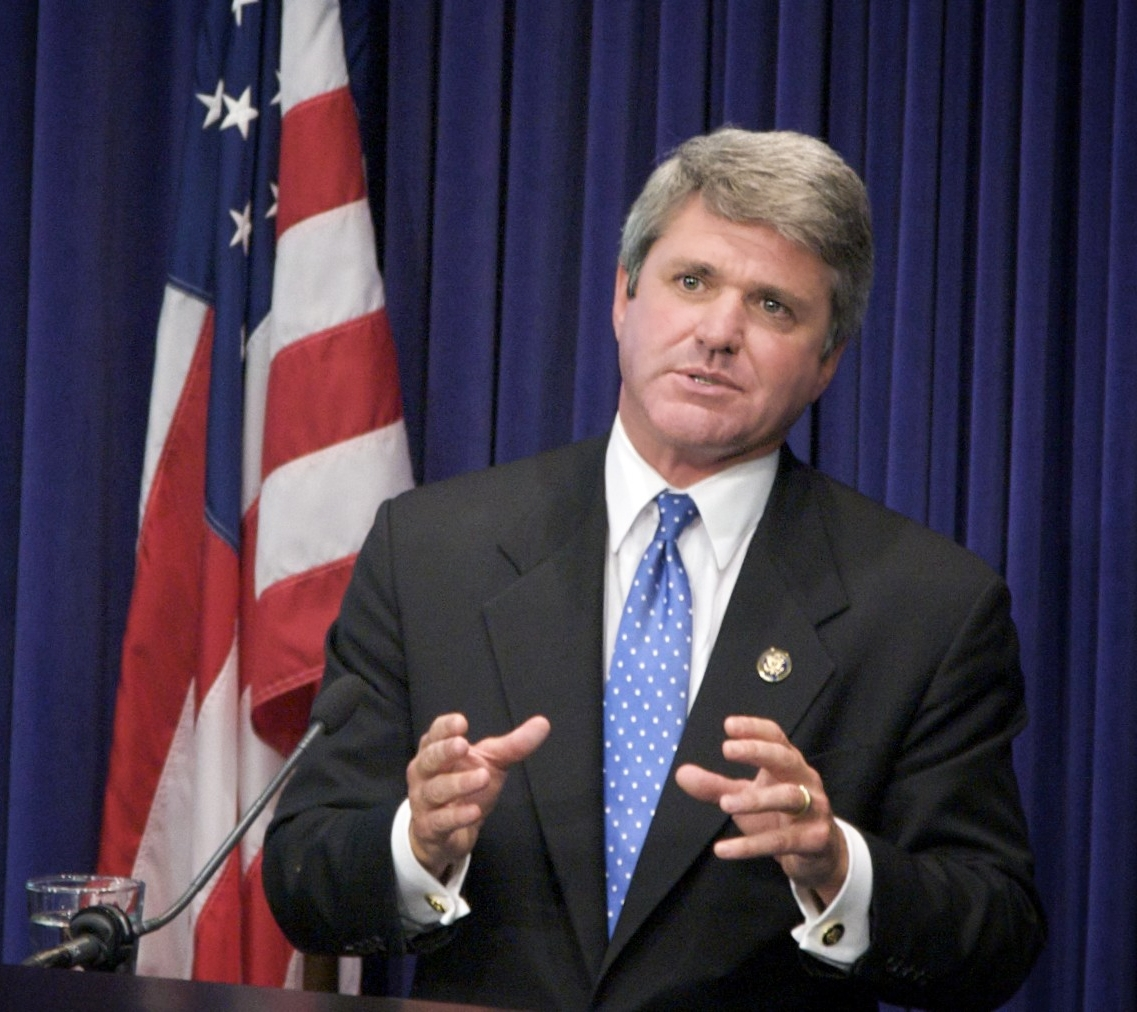
Congressman McCaul addressing cybersecurity at Rice University

On December 11, 2013, McCaul introduced legislation to require the Secretary of the Department of Homeland Security (DHS) to conduct cybersecurity activities on behalf of the federal government and codify DHS's role in preventing and responding to cybersecurity incidents involving the information technology (IT) systems of federal civilian agencies and critical infrastructure in the U.S. McCaul said the bill was "an important step toward addressing the cyber threat".

==== Donald Trump ====
On December 18, 2019, McCaul voted against both articles of impeachment against President Donald Trump. Of the 195 Republicans who voted, all voted against both impeachment articles. He also voted against creating an independent commission to investigate the January 6 attack encouraged by Trump's false claims of electoral fraud. However, unlike Trump and most Republican legislators, McCaul did not sign the Texas v. Pennsylvania amicus brief to file a motion in support of the case.

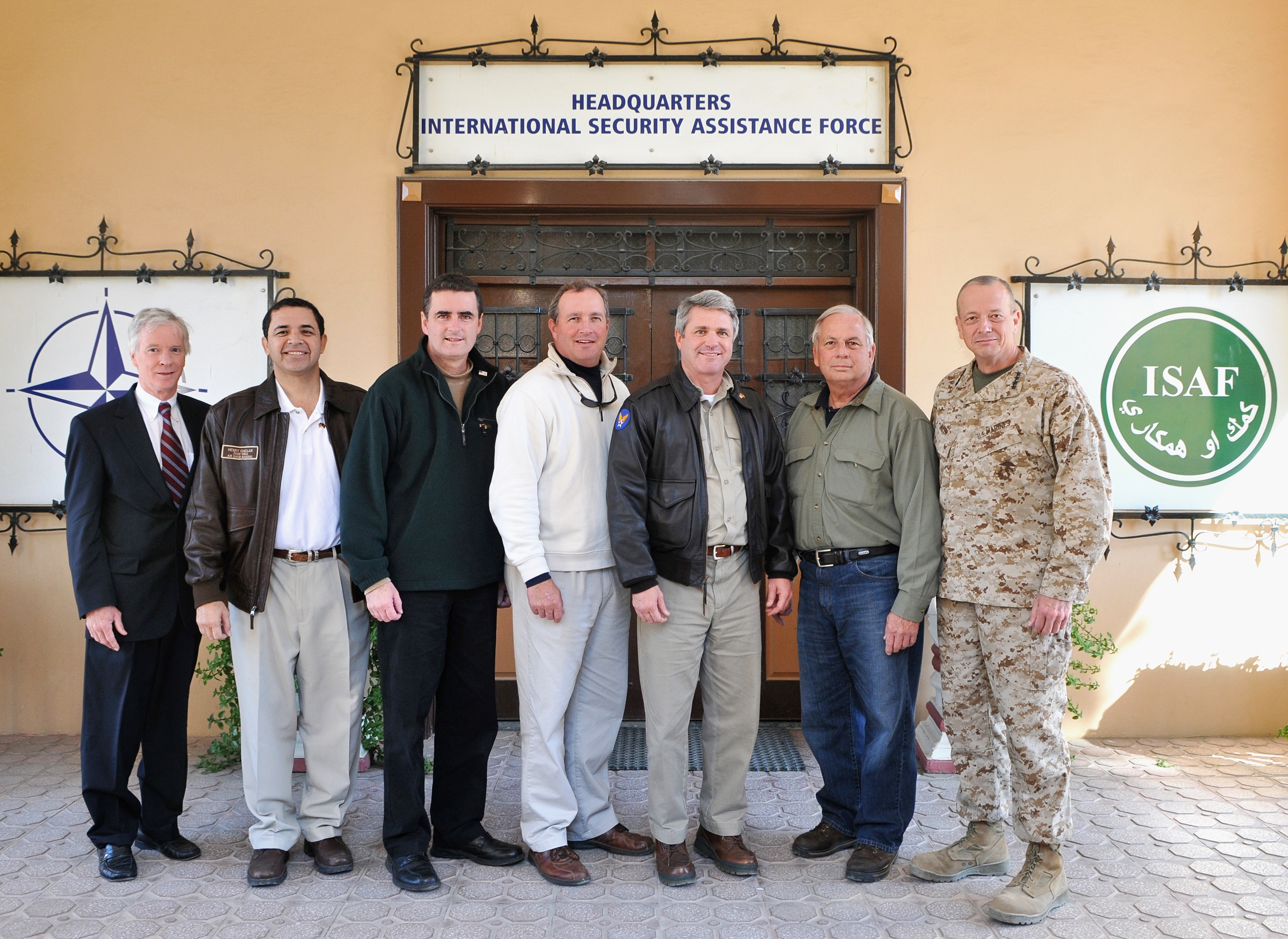
Congressman McCaul led House of Representatives Committee on Homeland Security to visit ISAF Headquarters

==== Foreign affairs ====
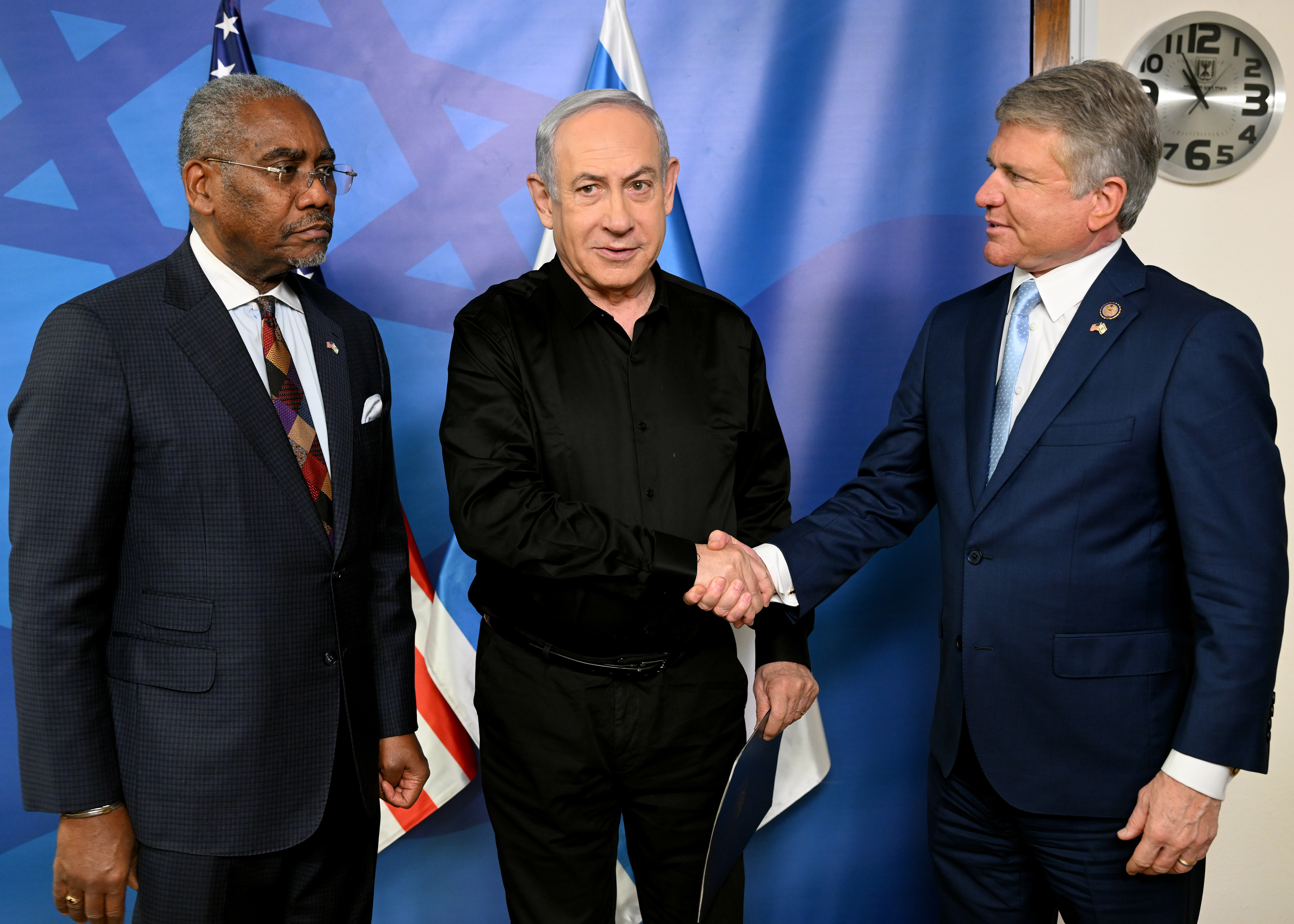
McCaul with Israeli prime minister Benjamin Netanyahu in Israel, November 12, 2023

In April 2019, McCaul spoke out against a resolution that would end U.S. involvement in the Yemeni Civil War, saying it would "disrupt US security cooperation agreements with more than 100 countries".

In 2021, McCaul strongly supported President Joe Biden's airstrikes on Iranian targets in Syria.

McCaul said he supports heavily arming Ukraine with the weapons they need to win the Russo-Ukrainian War. He believes the United States should send fighter jets and more missiles to Ukraine. In February 2023, McCaul met the President of Ukraine in Kyiv and advocated for the United States to send more military aid to Ukraine, especially ATACMS.

In April 2023, during a meeting with Taiwanese officials, McCaul compared General Secretary of the Chinese Communist Party Xi Jinping to Adolf Hitler.

On April 23, 2023, the Chinese Ministry of Foreign Affairs announced sanctions over McCaul, alleging his frequent interference in China's "internal affairs". In the 2024 United States House of Representatives elections, McCaul was targeted by the Chinese government's Spamouflage influence operation.

In November 2024, McCaul announced he was stepping down as chairman of the House Foreign Affairs Committee.

==== Immigration ====
McCaul supported President Donald Trump's proposals to build a wall along the Mexico–United States border. He supports the Remain in Mexico policy.

==== TikTok ====
Around the time of the introduction of Protecting Americans' Sensitive Data from Foreign Adversaries, the act including the TikTok ban, McCaul received attention for purchasing stock in Meta.

=== Committee assignments ===
- Committee on Foreign Affairs
- Committee on Homeland Security

=== Caucus memberships ===
- Founder and co-chair of the Congressional High Tech Caucus
- Co-founder and co-chair of the Childhood Cancer Caucus
- Co-chair of the Congressional Cyber Security Caucus
- Co-chair of the Congressional Caucus on Sudan and South Sudan
- Co-founder of the Congressional Argentina Caucus
- Rare Disease Caucus
- Tuberculosis Elimination Caucus
- United States Congressional International Conservation Caucus
- Republican Governance Group
- Republican Study Committee
- Congressional Caucus on Turkey and Turkish Americans
- Congressional Taiwan Caucus

== Personal life ==
McCaul is married to Linda Mays McCaul, the daughter of Clear Channel Communications founder and former chairman Lowry Mays and sister of its former CEO Mark Mays. In 2011, Roll Call named McCaul as one of the wealthiest members of the United States Congress, surpassing then U.S. senator John Kerry. His net worth was estimated at $294 million, up from $74 million the previous year. In 2004, the same publication estimated his net worth at $12 million. His wealth increase was due to large monetary transfers from his wife's family.

McCaul and his family live in West Lake Hills, Texas, a wealthy suburb of Austin, Texas.

McCaul is a devout Catholic and is a noted critic of Nicaraguan President Daniel Ortega due to Ortega's stance against the Catholic Church in Nicaragua.

On November 4, 2024, McCaul was briefly detained at Dulles International Airport by Metropolitan Washington Airport Authority police after appearing intoxicated, he said he had taken Ambien for flight anxiety and mixed it with alcohol. He was released by police and picked up by a family member.

== Electoral history ==
2004 United States House of Representatives elections in Texas: Texas District 10
Party	Candidate	Votes	%	±%
Republican	Michael McCaul	182,113	78.6	+78.6
Libertarian	Robert Fritsche	35,569	15.4	−0.3
Write-In	Lorenzo Sadun	13,961	6.0	+6.0
Majority		146,544	63.3	
Turnout		231,643		
Republican gain from Democratic		Swing	+81.5	

2006 United States House of Representatives elections in Texas: Texas District 10
Party	Candidate	Votes	%	±%
Republican	Michael McCaul (Incumbent)	97,618	55.32	−23.29
Democratic	Ted Ankrum	71,232	40.37	+40.37
Libertarian	Michael Badnarik	7,603	4.31	−11.04
Majority		26,686	14.95	
Turnout		176,453		
Republican hold		Swing	-48.31	

2008 United States House of Representatives elections in Texas: Texas District 10
Party	Candidate	Votes	%
Republican	Michael McCaul (Incumbent)	179,493	53.9
Democratic	Larry Joe Doherty	143,719	43.1
Libertarian	Matt Finkel	9,871	2.96
Republican hold			

2010 United States House of Representatives elections in Texas: Texas District 10
Party	Candidate	Votes	%
Republican	Michael McCaul (Incumbent)	144,980	64.67
Democratic	Ted Ankrum	74,086	33.05
Libertarian	Jeremiah "JP" Perkins	5,105	2.28
Total votes		224,171	100.00
Republican hold			

2012 United States House of Representatives elections in Texas: Texas District 10
Party	Candidate	Votes	%
Republican	Michael McCaul (Incumbent)	159,783	60.52
Democratic	Tawana Walter-Cadien	95,710	36.25
Libertarian	Richard Priest	8,526	3.23
Republican hold			

2014 United States House of Representatives elections in Texas: Texas's 10th district
Party	Candidate	Votes	%
Republican	Michael McCaul (Incumbent)	109,726	62.2
Democratic	Tawana Walter-Cadien	60,243	34.1
Libertarian	Bill Kelsey	6,491	3.7
Total votes		176,460	100.0
Republican hold			

2016 United States House of Representatives elections in Texas: Texas's 10th district
Party	Candidate	Votes	%
Republican	Michael McCaul (Incumbent)	179,221	57.3
Democratic	Tawana W. Cadien	120,170	38.5
Libertarian	Bill Kelsey	13,209	4.2
Total votes		312,600	100.0
Republican hold			

Incumbent Michael McCaul faced Assistant Attorney of Austin Mike Siegel in the 2018 general election, winning by 4.3 percent of the vote. This is the closest contest McCaul has faced. The outcome was notable in a district that political experts rated as "Heavily Republican".

2018 United States House of Representatives elections in Texas: Texas's 10th district
Party	Candidate	Votes	%
Republican	Michael McCaul (Incumbent)	157,166	51.1
Democratic	Mike Siegel	144,034	46.8
Libertarian	Mike Ryan	6,627	2.1
Total votes		307,827	100.0
Republican hold			

In the November 3, 2020 general election, incumbent Michael McCaul again defeated Austin Assistant Attorney Mike Siegel.

Texas's 10th congressional district, 2020
Party	Candidate	Votes	%
Republican	Michael McCaul (Incumbent)	217,216	52.5
Democratic	Mike Siegel	187,686	45.3
Libertarian	Roy Eriksen	8,992	2.2
Total votes		413,894	100.0
Republican hold			

Texas's 10th congressional district, 2022
Party	Candidate	Votes	%
Republican	Michael McCaul (incumbent)	159,469	63.30
Democratic	Linda Nuno	86,404	34.30
Libertarian	Bill Kelsey	6,064	2.41
Total votes		251,937	100.0
Republican hold			

Texas's 10th congressional district, 2024
Party	Candidate	Votes	%
Republican	Michael McCaul (incumbent)	221,229	63.60
Democratic	Theresa Boisseau	118,280	34.01
Libertarian	Jeff Miller	8,309	2.39
Total votes		347,818	100.0
Republican hold			

== Honors and awards ==
- Order of Brilliant Star with Grand Cordon (Taiwan)

== See also ==
- List of richest American politicians
- Final Report of the Task Force on Combating Terrorist and Foreign Fighter Travel

U.S. House of Representatives
Preceded by Lloyd Doggett	Member of the U.S. House of Representatives from Texas's 10th congressional district 2005–present	Incumbent
Preceded by Peter King	Chair of the House Homeland Security Committee; 2013–2019	Succeeded by Bennie Thompson
Preceded by Eliot Engel	Ranking Member of the House Foreign Affairs Committee; 2019–2023	Succeeded by Gregory Meeks
Preceded by Gregory Meeks	Chair of the House Foreign Affairs Committee; 2023–2025	Succeeded by Brian Mast
U.S. order of precedence (ceremonial)
Preceded by Al Green	United States representatives by seniority 49th	Succeeded by Gwen Moore
Preceded by Al Green	Order of precedence of the United States	Succeeded by Gwen Moore
