= 12 February 2024 Rafah strikes =

Israeli-conducted military assault

- Part of the background of the Rafah offensive and the Gaza war
- Location: 31°16′21″N 34°15′31″E; Rafah, southern Gaza Strip
- Date: 12 February 2024
- Attack type: Airstrikes, massacre
- Deaths: 83–100+
- Injuries: Unknown
- Perpetrator: Israeli Air Force

On 12 February 2024, Israel Defense Forces launched an assault on Rafah, a city in the Gaza Strip, killing over 83 people. The airstrikes destroyed at least one mosque and multiple inhabited homes, killing most or all of their occupants.

Israeli government sources linked the airstrikes to its hostage rescue operation, Operation Golden Hand, describing the airstrikes as a diversion or "covering fire." Israel freed two hostages in that operation. The strikes came as Israel proposed a ground invasion of the city, which caused international concern.

Casualties from the Israeli bombings began to reported by 2:30am and 20 were confirmed dead by 5:30am. The total number of deaths was estimated as at least 94 people according to the Palestinian Health Ministry and the Palestinian Red Crescent Society has estimated the death toll to be over 100. According to the Palestinian Center for Human Rights, which pulled information from Rafah hospitals the dead included at least 27 children and 22 women. The Euro-Med Human Rights Monitor compiled a list of 83 people killed, of whom 29 were children and another third were women (as identified by their names).

== Background ==
On October 7, 2023, Hamas led an attack on Israel, which led to the death of 1,100 Israelis and taking hundreds hostage. This event was the catalyst for the Gaza war. During the first four months of Israeli airstrikes and the ground invasion of the Gaza Strip, over 28,000 Palestinians were killed, most of whom were civilians. The war has led to an international wave of protests and calls for Israel to be charged with Gaza genocide, with Israel adamant that the war won't stop until all of the hostages are freed and Hamas is dissolved.

In October 2023, Israel ordered evacuations in Northern Gaza for Israeli operations against Hamas, causing concern from human rights groups. Previous evacuation orders had instructed Palestinian civilians to go to Rafah, leading to the area to hold about 1.4 million Palestinians. Israeli officials have raised allegations that they believe senior Hamas officials are sheltering in Rafah along with the remaining hostages. Many of the evacuees are in overcrowded conditions within Rafah, with many crowded into houses or tents, with some even sleeping on the streets with no cover. Rafah is reportedly the last major population center in Gaza not occupied by the IDF, with others that have taken over reported as wastelands with total destruction, bodies left in the streets and civilians resorting to drinking out of toilets for water.

In February 2024, Prime Minister of Israel Benjamin Netanyahu ordered the IDF to plan evacuations in Rafah, which along with the airstrikes has caused concern from organizations such as the European Union and the United Nations. Netanyahu reportedly spoke against calls for Israel to avoid carrying out a military offensive in Rafah claiming it was a smuggling haven for Hamas.

== Airstrikes ==
According to the Associated Press, Israeli airstrikes in Rafah began at 1:50am local time on 12 February, one minute after the start of a hostage rescue operation in a house in the Shaboura area of Rafah. The Israeli military said that it had conducted a series of airstrikes on targets in the Shaboura area of Rafah, while the Rafah municipality claimed at least two mosques and about a dozen homes were hit. Reporting and analysis of satellite imagery concluded that the airstrikes extended far beyond Shaboura.

The Israeli government stated that the night's airstrikes were conducted as a diversion in order to rescue two hostages. Israeli intentions with the strikes, as described by military spokesman Major Nir Dinar were: "to hit Hamas military command centers, confuse the militants, sever contact between the hostages’ captors and their commanders, and provide cover for the escape." Axios reported that the strikes resulted in the deaths of at least 67 civilians

A civilian who had been sheltering in Rafah stated that the night was indescribable, and he and others around him thought that the IDF was invading Rafah due to the amount of airstrikes. Among the locations struck were the Al-Huda mosque, and the family homes of the Abu-Jazar, Hassouna, and Al-Shaer families. Libération newspaper geolocated these sites as between 1.5 and 2.2 kilometers away from the hostage rescue. Eighteen members of the Abu-Jazar family were killed in their home in the Badr refugee camp, including an infant and three young Qwaider children who were cousins of the Abu-Jazars. The Hassouna family, who rented a house after fleeing violence elsewhere in Gaza, was attacked by an airstrike to their one-story house, which was destroyed, killing eight family members, including two children. Among them was Sidra Hassouna, who was thrown out of the building and left hanging from a wall. Photos of Sidra Hassouna's lifeless body widely circulated on social media. The Hasounas were relatives of Palestine's Ambassador the UK, Husam Zomlot. Eight members of the Al-Shaer family, spanning three generations, were killed in their home, which was collapsed by an airstrike. Other sites were struck and the AP reported that the airstrikes "flatten[ed] several residential blocks in a built-up refugee camp." Following the hostage rescue operation, the site where the hostages were held was leveled.

The Al-Huda mosque was largely destroyed, but parishioners held worship services in the remains of the building on February 23.

These actions have been interpreted as possible war crimes.

=== Hostage raid ===
The hostage raid was the second successful rescue mission of a hostage during the Gaza war, with the first occurring on October 30, 2023. An IDF spokesperson Daniel Hagari, told reporters the rescue attempt was a covert operation and happened at around 1:49 am local time, with the airstrikes following a few minutes later. IDF soldiers reportedly broke into a second floor apartment where the men were being held, and fired against militants guarding them throughout the building. When the airstrikes began the soldiers reportedly covered the hostages with their bodies to protect from debris. The rescue attempt lasted about an hour and resulted in the deaths of two IDF soldiers. The reported hostages were identified as Fernando Marman (aged 60) and Luis Har (aged 70), who are both dual Israeli-Argentine citizens and had been kidnapped from the Kibbutz Nir Yitzhak.

== Super Bowl LVIII ==
Some commentators pointed out that millions of Americans were celebrating the Super Bowl simultaneously as dozens of Palestinians were being killed. Jewish Voice for Peace stated: "The Israeli military is bombing Rafah, the most densely populated area in the world, while Americans watch the Super Bowl. This is intentional." The Super Bowl also aired several ads that pushed the narrative that Israel was at war with Hamas, without mentioning the 29,000 Palestinians who had been killed by the Israeli invasion of the Gaza Strip. The ads were sponsored by the Israeli government and cost an estimated $7 million. The Federal Communications Commission received 10,000 complaints about the ad, as it did not disclose that it was paid for by a foreign government.

American-Arab Anti-Discrimination Committee stated that the attacks on Rafah were planned to coincide with the Super Bowl as Israel knew the American public would not be paying attention on other news on that day. Dave Zirin also said that Israel influencing the American public through ads, as it killed dozens of Palestinians, was "more like military synergy than happenstance."

== Aftermath ==
A Hamas spokesperson called the airstrikes a series of "horrific massacres against defenseless civilians and displaced children, women and the elderly".

The prosecutor of the International Criminal Court, Karim Khan has stated that the reports coming from Rafah were cause for deep concern and seemed to be ignoring laws of armed conflict. Some such as sports commentator Dave Zirin called it the "Super Bowl Massacre" due to their concurrence with Super Bowl LVIII. Harvard University students participated in a "die-in" at Widener Library to protest against the airstrikes, which was publicized online by the Palestinian Red Crescent Society, and other groups.

== See also ==
- Rafah offensive
- Jabalia refugee camp airstrikes (2023–2024)
- Attacks on Palestinians evacuating Gaza City
- Al-Shifa ambulance airstrike
