= Palestine–United Kingdom relations =

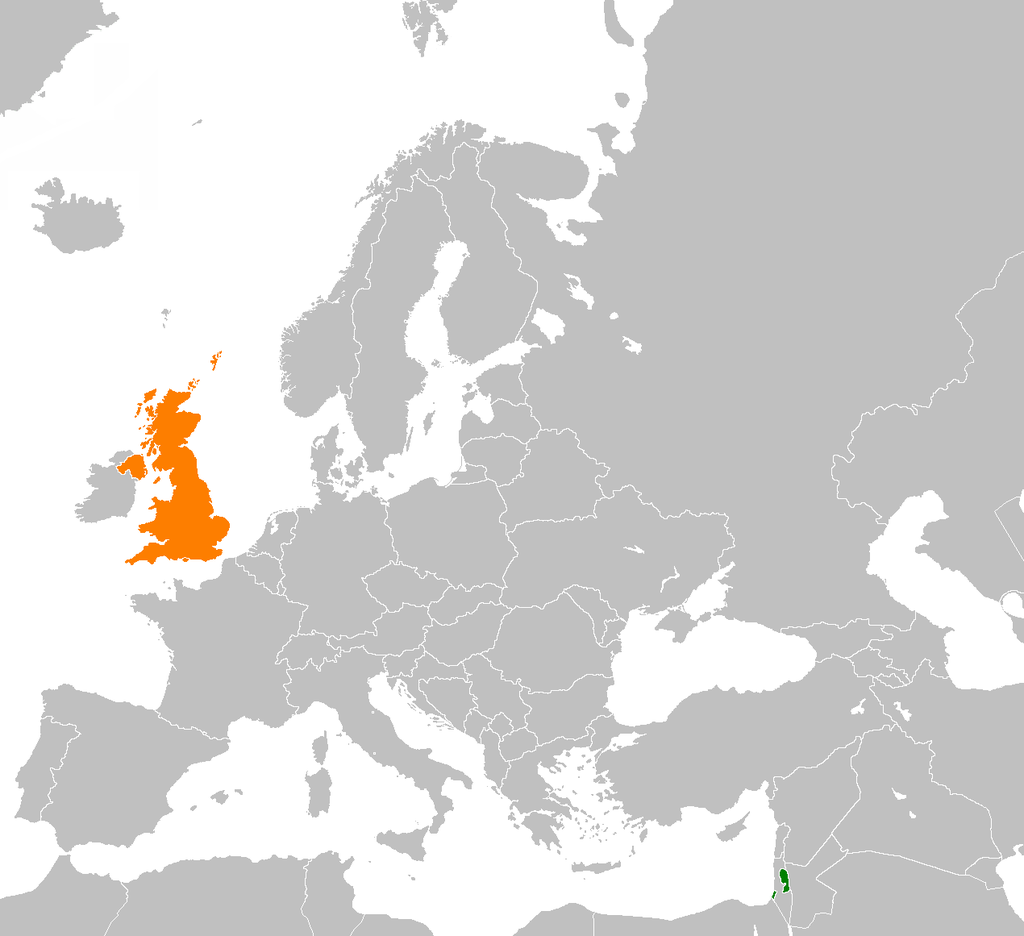

- Palestine: United Kingdom

Diplomatic mission
- Embassy of Palestine, London: UK Mission, Jerusalem

Envoy
- Ambassador Husam Zomlot: Consul-General Helen Winterton

The United Kingdom formally recognised the State of Palestine as an independent sovereign state in September 2025. The UK had a non-accredited Consulate General in Jerusalem that "represents the UK government in Jerusalem, West Bank, and Gaza", and works on "political, commercial, security and economic interests between the UK and the Palestinian territories". In 2026, Israel closed the East Jerusalem consulate after the UK brought sanctions against illegal Israeli settlements in the West Bank, though Israel let the UK retain reduced diplomatic staff in a "UK Mission". Husam Zomlot became head of the Palestine Mission to the United Kingdom in 2018. Palestine was represented in London by Manuel Hassassian, the Palestinian General Delegate to the United Kingdom between 2005 and 2018. Another former Palestinian General Delegate to the UK was Afif Safieh, who began in that role in 1990. As of September 2025, the UK Prime Minister has appointed a special envoy on Palestinian economic issues; Michael Barber currently serves in this role.

The UK House of Commons voted in favour of recognising Palestine as a state in 2014, as a contribution towards achieving a negotiated two-state solution. However, the UK government continued its policy of reserving the right to recognise Palestine bilaterally at a more opportune time for peace efforts, until it eventually recognised Palestine on 21 September 2025. Palestine inaugurated its embassy in London on 5 January 2026.

== History ==
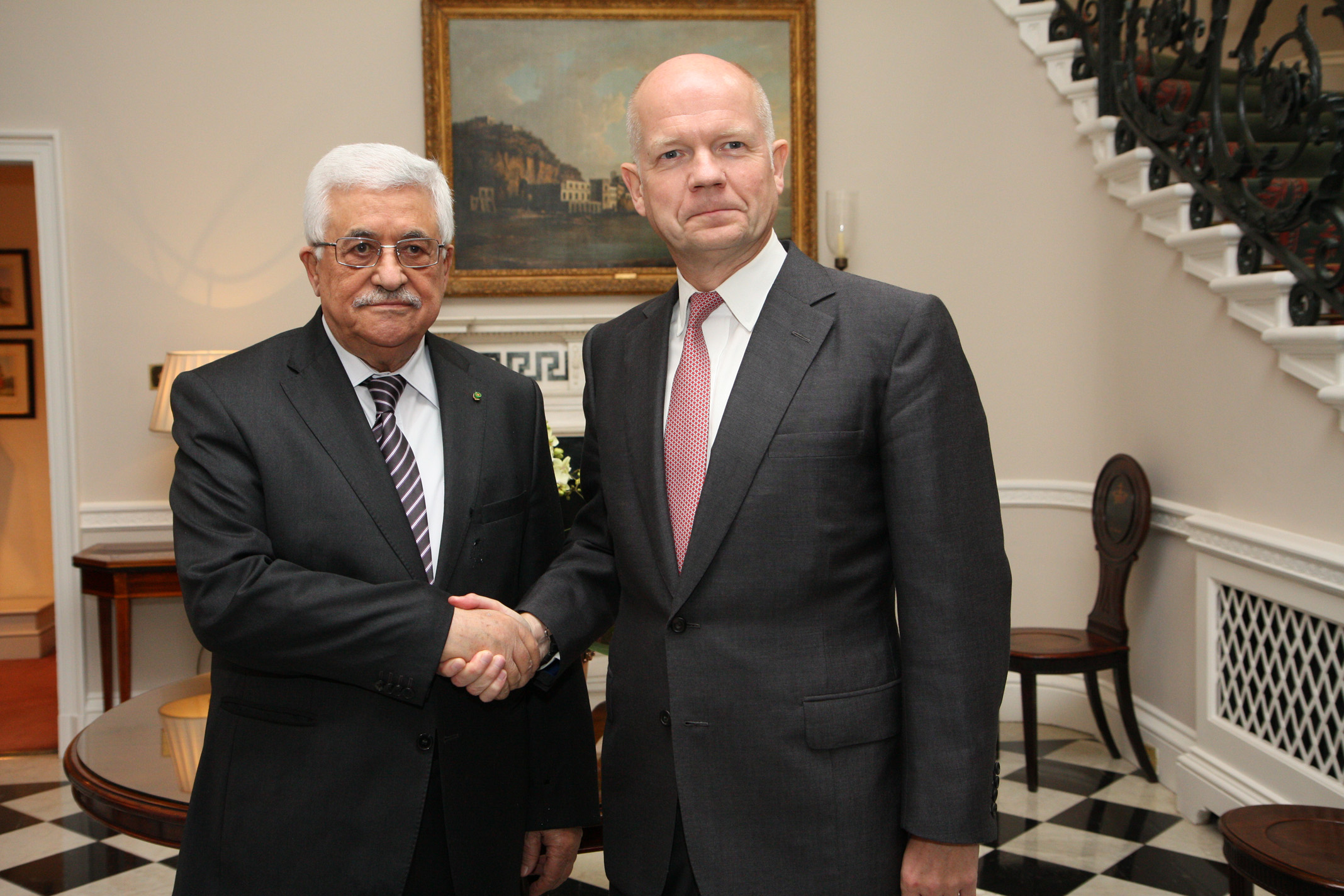
British Foreign Secretary William Hague meeting Palestinian President Mahmoud Abbas in September 2013

After it promised to assist its allies in forming an Arab Union in return for them helping it defeat the Ottoman Empire in the First World War, the British government assumed control of a portion of the Southern Levant, later known as Mandatory Palestine, under the aegis of the Sykes-Picot Agreement and later the League of Nations. It effectively ruled the multiethnic region as a colony from 1920 onward, though it endorsed an eventual Jewish homeland in the area through the Balfour Declaration. The British government oversaw increased Jewish immigration, leading to intercommunal conflict in Mandatory Palestine mostly between Arabs and Jews, culminating in the 1929 Palestine riots, the Arab revolt of 1936–39, and the Jewish insurgency of the 1940s. During the Second World War, the Palestinian Arabs were split on the issue of whether to support the British military or the Axis powers, with the Nashashibi family leading the moderate, pro-British faction and the al-Husayni family leading the hardline, pro-Axis faction; each faction tended to have different opinions about the Jewish settlers. When the war ended with the exchequer drained of financial resources, the British government attempted to defuse the issue of resolving the ethnic violence by referring it to the United Nations, which formed an Ad Hoc Committee on the Palestinian Question. Its partition plan, which created a two-state solution of a Jewish homeland (taking up 57% of the area) flanked by an Arab homeland (taking up 43%), called for the British to terminate its League of Nations mandate in May 1948, and fully withdraw the following August. The UK abstained in the UN partition plan vote on 29 November 1947, and the 1947–48 civil war broke out. The British withdrew their troops early by the end of its mandate in May, when the Jewish-majority State of Israel declared independence. The civil war intensified into a broader regional conflict, becoming the 1948 Arab–Israeli War. The war ended in 1949, with Egypt occupying Gaza, Jordan occupying the West Bank, and both nations largely defining their present borders; Britain by then had supported the Palestinian right of return of refugees in voting for United Nations General Assembly Resolution 194, and would later agree to the Tripartite Declaration of 1950 in which it would enforce the terms of the Armistice Agreement.

Since the Six-Day War of 1967 which saw Israel occupy the West Bank and Gaza, the British government has been active in achieving a diplomatic settlement of the Israeli–Palestinian conflict. The issue of a Palestinian state was raised already in July 1967 by Labour MP Paul Rose. Margaret Thatcher generally supported a Jordanian-Palestinian confederation and was willing to consider some Palestine Liberation Organization involvement in this solution.

In April 2013, then-Prime Minister David Cameron stated:

There is no more urgent foreign policy in 2013 than restarting Israeli-Palestinian talks and making substantive progress towards the two-state solution...we are concerned by developments that threaten the viability of the two-state solution, including the construction of settlements on occupied land in the West Bank and East Jerusalem...Our goal is a secure and universally recognised Israel living alongside a sovereign and viable Palestinian state, based on the borders of 1967, with Jerusalem the future capital of both states, and a just, fair and realistic settlement for refugees...The British government is clear that, ultimately, the way to resolve the Israeli-Palestinian conflict is through direct negotiations between the parties. We continue to call on both sides to show the strong leadership needed to achieve peace, to take the necessary steps to build trust and to work towards the resumption of negotiations without preconditions.

In February 2021, the British Consul-General in Jerusalem, Philip Hall, condemned settlements in the Israeli-occupied territories as "illegal and an obstacle to restarting peace talks" between Israel and Palestine. That same month, the Court of First Instance in Nablus ruled that the British government's Balfour Declaration in 1917 was invalid and called on the British government to issue an apology to the Palestinian people. In April, the Palestinian government said that relations had reached a "low point" after British Prime Minister Boris Johnson announced his opposition to an International Criminal Court investigation into alleged war crimes in the Israeli-occupied territories. In May, Pro-Palestinian protests were held in London during that month's Israel–Palestine crisis.

On 28 April 2025, Prime Minister Keir Starmer met with the Prime Minister of the Palestinian Authority, Mohammad Mustafa in Downing Street. Keir Starmer expressed his condolences for the loss of life in Gaza. He said that the UK does not support the resumption in hostilities He added that the UK will continue to press for a return to the ceasefire as a first step to a lasting peace, and reiterated that the return of humanitarian aid into Gaza is critical. He also said that unlawful settlement and violence is of deep concern in the West Bank. Discussing the Arab Plan for Gaza, Keir Starmer shared the UK’s support for the Palestinian Authority’s reform programme, which he said is critical. The leaders agreed that a strategic political framework will be necessary as part of the implementation of a two-state solution, and that Hamas must have no role in Gaza’s governance.

== Economic relations ==
From 1 July 1997 until 30 December 2020, trade between the Palestinian Authority and the UK was governed by the Palestinian Authority–European Union Association Agreement, while the United Kingdom was a member of the European Union. Following the withdrawal of the United Kingdom from the European Union, the UK and the Palestinian Authority signed a continuity trade agreement on 18 February 2019, based on the EU free trade agreement; the agreement entered into force on 1 January 2021. Trade value between Palestinian Authority and the United Kingdom was worth £69 million in 2022.

== Recognition of the State of Palestine ==
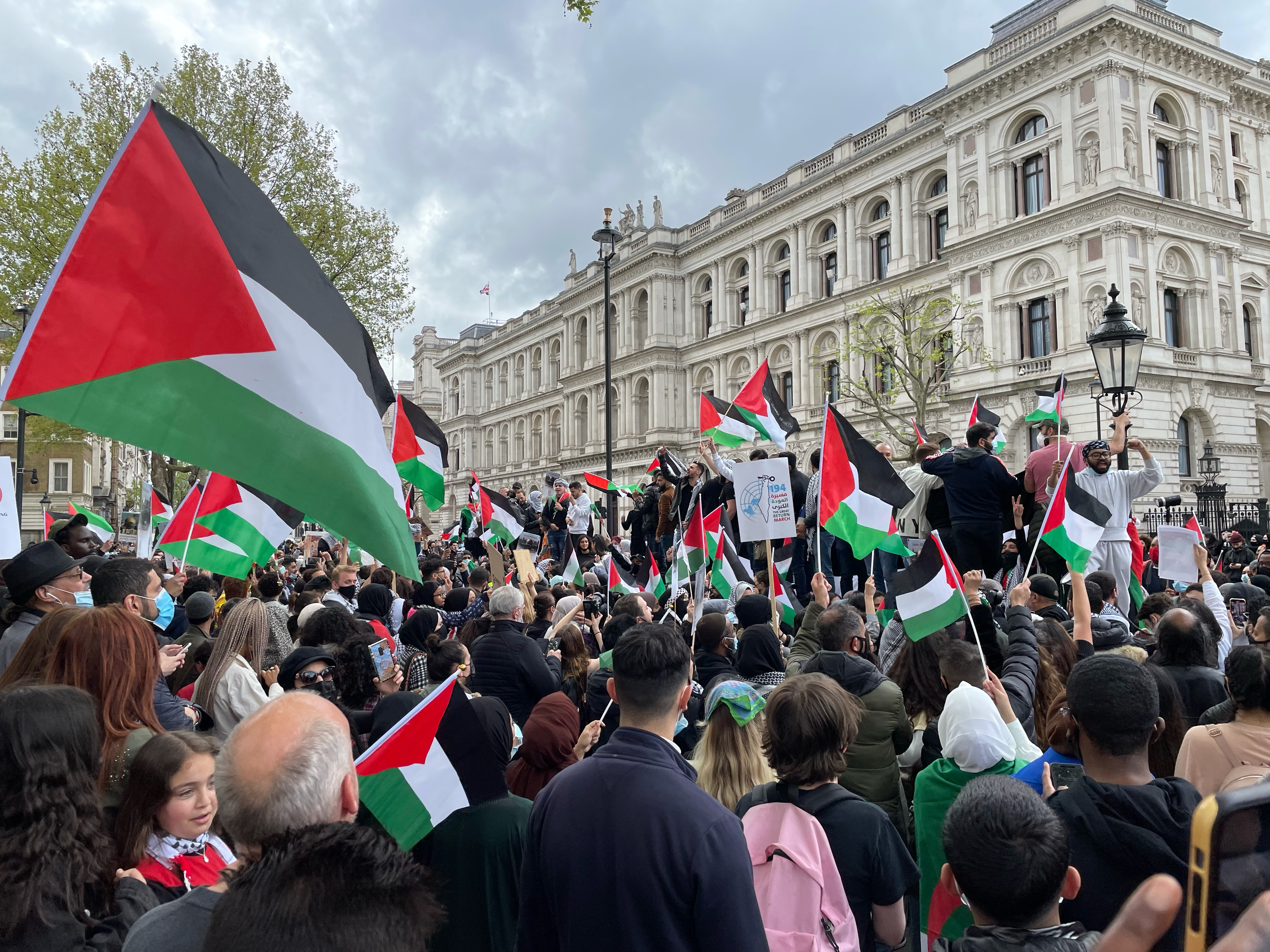
Pro-Palestinian demonstration in London in May 2021

In October 2014, the UK House of Commons passed a motion which called on the government to recognise Palestine as an independent state. Also in October 2014, the devolved government of Scotland called for recognition of Palestine as an independent state and for the UK to open an embassy there. Jeremy Corbyn, former Leader of the Opposition, is a longtime advocate for Palestinian causes and repeatedly pledged to recognise the country if elected.

In January 2024 the Foreign Secretary, David Cameron indicated that the United Kingdom could formally recognise and establish diplomatic relations to a Palestinian state during the negotiations for a peace deal of the Gaza war. Palestinian Ambassador to the UK, Husam Zomlot remarked that it is the “first time a UK foreign secretary considers recognising the State of Palestine, bilaterally and in the UN, as a contribution to a peaceful solution rather than an outcome”.

On 8 February 2024, then-Shadow Foreign Secretary David Lammy stated that a Labour government would consider unilaterally recognising a Palestinian state if they entered government in the 2024 general election.

On 9 December 2024, prime minister Starmer announced the appointment of Michael Barber as his special envoy for Palestinian economic affairs. On 29 July 2025, Starmer announced that the United Kingdom "will recognise Palestinian statehood in September ahead of the United Nations General Assembly unless the Israeli government takes substantive steps to end the appalling situation in Gaza, reaches a ceasefire, makes clear there will be no annexation in the West Bank, and commits to a long-term peace process that delivers a two-state solution". On the same day, Foreign Secretary David Lammy made a similar announcement at a UN conference on the implementation of the two-state solution. In response, Hamas praised the decision as "one of the fruits of October 7". This statement prompted criticism from Labour MPs and families of hostages, who called for a delay in recognition until all hostages are released. A September 2025 survey conducted by JL Partners concluded that nearly 90% of Britons oppose recognition of Palestine without conditions; however, a poll by YouGov the same day put support for recognition of Palestine at 44%, with 18% opposed. An earlier poll by Ipsos recorded a similar result of 44% in favour and 13% opposed. On 21 September 2025, the United Kingdom alongside Canada and Australia officially recognised the State of Palestine. Prime Minister Keir Starmer said that the United Kingdom believes that "Hamas will have no role in the future of Palestine and reiterates [its] call for them to release the hostages immediately and unconditionally".

== Controversies ==
The BBC's relations with Palestine were tested in February 2025 when it withdrew a controversial documentary, Gaza: How to Survive a War Zone, after discovering serious flaws in its production. The film, narrated by a 13-year-old boy, Abdullah, was criticised after it emerged that he was the son of a Hamas official, a group designated as a terrorist organisation by the UK. Following an internal review, the BBC said it had failed to uncover this connection during the production process. The BBC and the film's production company, Hoyo Films, both acknowledged mistakes, and the BBC launched an audit to assess the film's finances. The controversy prompted responses from UK government officials, including Prime Minister Keir Starmer and Culture Secretary Lisa Nandy, who called for a rigorous review.

== See also ==
- Foreign relations of Palestine
- Foreign relations of the United Kingdom
- Consulate General of the United Kingdom, Jerusalem
