= Consulate General of the United Kingdom, Jerusalem =

British consulate

British Consulate General in Jerusalem הקונסוליה הכללית הבריטית בירושלים القنصلية البريطانية العامة في القدس UK Mission, Jerusalem
- Location: Jerusalem
- Address: 15 Nashashibi Street, Sheikh Jarrah, East Jerusalem
- Opened: 1838; 1948; 2026 (as UK Mission, Jerusalem)
- Closed: 1914; 2026

The British Consulate General in Jerusalem, renamed the UK Mission, Jerusalem is the British diplomatic representation in Jerusalem, the West Bank and the Gaza Strip. It operated as a general consulate from 1838 to 1914 and from 1948 to 2026. The former consulate is located in the Sheikh Jarrah neighborhood of East Jerusalem. In 2026, the building was transformed into a UK Mission with reduced diplomatic status and no consular status.

== History ==
The British Consulate in Jerusalem was established in 1838, when William Tanner Young was appointed as Britain’s first vice-consul in Jerusalem. He arrived and began serving there in 1839, which is why some historical sources give 1839 as the founding date. The National Library of Israel, for example, dates the British Consulate’s operation from 1839 to November 1914 when Britain declared war on the Ottoman Empire. After the First World War and the British Mandate period, the Consulate-General was re-established in 1948, with Sir Hugh Dow serving as consul from 1948 to 1951.

The land for the current consulate was purchased in 1963, when East Jerusalem was under Jordanian control, but when the building was completed in 1967 East Jerusalem was under Israeli control after the Six-Day War. The British foreign secretary stated in June 1967 "Our consul-general in Jerusalem is subordinate neither to the ambassador in Tel Aviv nor to the ambassador in Amman, but directly to the Foreign Office." In 1969, a bomb damaged the consulate.

The British government's position is that per the 1967 United Nations Security Council Resolution 242 and subsequent resolutions, East Jerusalem, where the consulate is located, is considered under Israeli occupation.

In February 2021, the British Consul-General in Jerusalem, Philip Hall, condemned Israeli settlements in the West Bank as "illegal and an obstacle to restarting peace talks".

On 21 September 2025, the United Kingdom officially recognised the State of Palestine.

On 8 September 2026, Israel ordered the closure of the consulate after the UK imposed sanctions on products from Israeli settlements in the West Bank, which are regarded as illegal. Israel announced that the consulate must close within 30 days and that diplomats assigned ‌there will lose their accreditation after the deadline expires.

However, a legal opinion from Dominic Grieve KC, who was Attorney General for England and Wales from 2010 to 2014, for the British Palestine Project points out that the British Consulate Generals in Jerusalem do not present commissions to Israel, so there is no accreditation from Israel to be withdrawn, and that the order is "an unlawful assertion of sovereignty over occupied Palestinian territory". Grieve also pointed out the UK government had formally accepted the July 2024 International Court of Justice advisory opinion that governments should consider Israel's presence in occupied Palestinian territory as unlawful, which implied the UK government had a duty to oppose the order to close. On 28 September, foreign secretary Ed Miliband said the government was "looking at all our options" regarding the consulate, which he said had operated for nearly 200 years.

On 8 October 2026, the British Consulate General ceased operations, and 20 diplomats, including the Consul-General, left the country. The building of the former consulate was transformed into a UK Mission, which does not have consular status, and the remaining skeleton staff will operate under a fragile, scaled-down compromise.

== Consuls list ==
- William Tanner Young, from 1839 to 1845 (first)
- Helen Winterton, from 2024 to 2026 (last)

== See also ==
- Palestine–United Kingdom relations
- List of consulates-general in Jerusalem
