= Killing of Sidra Hassouna =

2024 killing of a Palestinian child by the IDF

- Part of the Gaza war
- Location: Rafah, Gaza Strip
- Date: 12 February 2024
- Deaths: 8
- Perpetrator: Israel Defense Forces

Sidra Hassouna (Arabic: سيدرا حسونة) was a 7-year-old Palestinian girl from the northern Gaza Strip who, along with her family as well as over 75 others, were killed during a series of airstrikes in Rafah carried out by the Israel Defense Forces (IDF) on 12 February 2024. As a result of the attack, Hassouna, her twin sister, 15-month old brother, parents, grandparents and uncle were killed after the IDF bombed the building they had been sheltering in Rafah, where she had been forcibly displaced.

Her killing received major attention on social media, as an image began circulating showing her mutilated body. Both of her legs had been torn off by the airstrikes, leaving her lifeless body hanging from the higher point of a destroyed house. Hassouna and her family members were identified by Husam Zomlot, the Palestinian Ambassador to the United Kingdom, as her relative.

The attacks by the IDF occurred during an operation to free two hostages held by Hamas, held 1.7 kilometres (1.1 mi) away from where her family was killed. Israeli government sources linked the airstrikes to the 2024 Rafah hostage raid, describing the airstrikes as a diversion or "covering fire."

== Killing ==
On 12 February 2024, an airstrike assault was launched by the Israel Defense Forces on Rafah, a city in the southern Gaza Strip, where an estimated one million Palestinians, including Hassouna and her family, had been seeking refuge. Hassouna, along with her twin sister, 15-month old brother, parents, grandparents and uncle, who had been forcibly displaced from northern Gaza, were killed during the airstrikes when the building they had been sheltering in was bombed. As a result of the attacks, both of Hassouna's legs had been torn off by the airstrikes, which left her lifeless body hanging from a higher point of a destroyed house. In total, the airstrikes killed over 83 people.

== Response ==
Hassouna's story gained international attention after a graphic image of Hassouna's mutilated body began to circulate on social media, including Instagram. Hassouna was identified by Husam Zomlot, the Palestine Ambassador to the United Kingdom, as the cousin of his wife. He made an additional post on Twitter, sharing an image of Hassouna as well as the image of her lifeless body, as well as images of additional relatives killed in the attack. Zomlot received condolences from MPs Zarah Sultana, Richard Burgon and Nadia Whittome as well as former shadow chancellor John McDonnell.

During the 2024 pro-Palestinian campus protests at Massachusetts Institute of Technology, high school protesters renamed Massachusetts Avenue in reference to Hassouna. On 10 May 2024, Harvard College protesters on Harvard Yard additionally renamed multiple dormitories, including Holworthy Hall to "Hassouna Hall", to honor killed Palestinian children and journalists. Figures such as S.K. Ali, Jeremy Corbyn, and Owen Jones also denounced Hassouna's killing.

== See also ==
- Killing of Hind Rajab
