= Kirsty Wark =

Scottish journalist and television presenter (born 1955)

Kirsty Wark FRSE
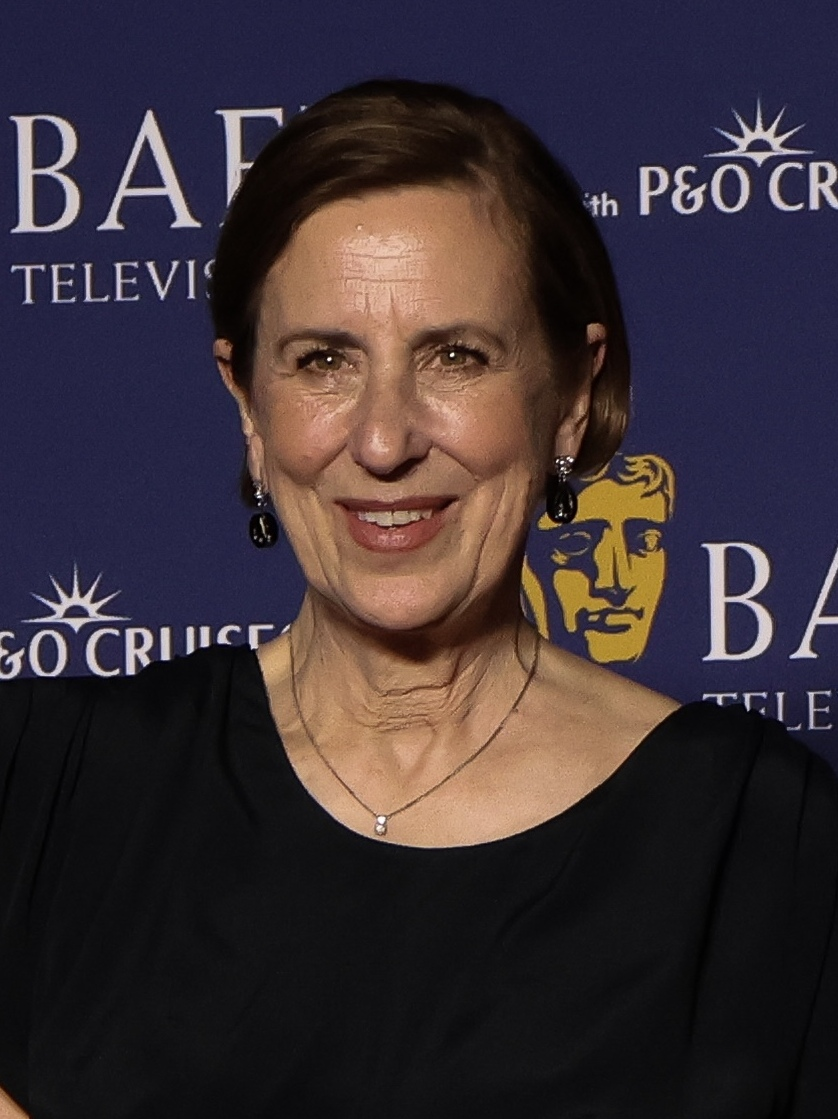
- Wark in 2026
- Born: Kirsteen Anne Wark; 3 February 1955 (age 71); Dumfries, Scotland
- Education: Wellington School, Ayr
- Alma mater: University of Edinburgh
- Occupation: Television journalist
- Years active: 1976–present
- Employer: BBC
- Notable credit: Newsnight ● Good Morning Scotland ● Breakfast Time
- Spouse: Alan Clements (m. 1989)
- Children: 2
- Awards: BAFTA Fellowship (2025)

Kirsteen Anne Wark (born 3 February 1955) is a Scottish television presenter and journalist. She has primarily spent her career working for the BBC, most notably as the longest-serving presenter of the news and current affairs programme Newsnight from 1993 to 2024.

Wark's career began at BBC Radio Scotland as a researcher and programme producer before switching to television. Throughout her career, Wark has interviewed notable people, including British prime ministers Margaret Thatcher and Tony Blair, American president Barack Obama and fashion designer Vivienne Westwood.

In 2025, Wark was honoured with the BAFTA Fellowship at the 2025 British Academy Television Awards for contributions to British media.

Since leaving Newsnight, Wark has continued to work for the BBC as a presenter; this has included BBC Radio 4's art and culture programme Front Row and on BBC Scotland's 2024 election coverage.

== Early life ==
Wark was born in Dumfries, Scotland, to James "Jimmy" Wark, a solicitor, and Roberta Wark, a schoolteacher. She spent the first few years of her life in Castle Douglas, Kirkcudbrightshire, before moving to Kilmarnock, Ayrshire. She used to play tennis in the lane next to her house. She has one younger brother. Her father served in the Second Battalion of the Glasgow Highlanders during the Second World War and was awarded a Military Cross for heroism during the Normandy Landings. Wark was educated at Kilmarnock Grammar Primary and subsequently Ayr's independent Wellington School. She studied history, specifically Scottish Studies, at the University of Edinburgh.

== Career ==
Wark joined the BBC in 1976 as a graduate researcher for BBC Radio Scotland, before promotion a year later as producer of Good Morning Scotland and current affairs programmes.

Wark switched to television in 1982, producing Reporting Scotland and the lunchtime political programme Agenda and current affairs series Current Account. She then moved into presenting, fronting Reporting Scotland, Seven Days, Left, Right and Centre and Scottish Questions coverage for BBC Scotland, before moving to network television as part of the Breakfast Time presenting team. In 1988, she was one of the first reporters to cover the Lockerbie bombings. In 1990, Wark demonstrated her distinctive line of questioning in an interview with Prime Minister Margaret Thatcher. Wark was a presenter on BBC2 arts programme The Late Show (from 1990 to 1993) and the heritage programme One Foot in the Past. In the mid-1990s, Wark presented the monthly audience debate programme Words with Wark (1994–98), In 1999, she presented The Kirsty Wark Show, her own interview programme. Wark has been a presenter on the BBC programme Newsnight from 1993 to 2024.

During the 1990s, she presented many programmes produced by her production company Wark Clements & Co, including Words With Wark, Restless Nation, Building A Nation and Lives Less Ordinary.

In 2006, she presented a series of programmes on BBC television about countries on the continent entitled Tales from Old Europe. In June 2006, she interviewed Nobel Prize-winning playwright Harold Pinter. Wark hosted the 10th annual Glenfiddich Spirit of Scotland Awards on 30 November 2007 for STV. She made a cameo appearance in the 2008 Doctor Who episode "The Poison Sky". She replaced David Baddiel as host of the BBC Four programme The Book Quiz in 2008 and hosted a BBC Two quiz show, A Question of Genius, which ran from 2009 to 2010. In 2011 she was chosen to host a BBC food quiz show entitled A Question of Taste, pitting two teams of food fanatics against one another.

Wark participated in the 2011 series of Celebrity MasterChef, where she reached the final and narrowly lost out to Phil Vickery. On 1 January 2012, Wark appeared in a cameo role as herself in the revival of the BBC's Absolutely Fabulous. In January 2013, she appeared in a special series of The Great British Bake Off, where she was awarded Star Baker. Later that year, she made a cameo appearance in two episodes of The Politician's Husband which aired on BBC Two.

Wark has been visible and vocal in the media about her experience of menopause and helped to raise awareness of this aspect of women's health more widely. In 2017, she made a BBC documentary Let's talk about the menopause because she felt that women are still "shockingly ill-informed".

In 2018, Margarita Simonyan, the Russia Today (RT) journalist who interviewed the two Russian suspects of the poisoning of Sergei and Yulia Skripal, terminated an interview with Wark. It came after Wark challenged "the manner of the interview" and asked if the interview did not just reinforce the notion that RT was a "propaganda tool of the Russian state". Simonyan said Wark's questions seemed "like typical Western propaganda".

Since 2020, Wark has presented the BBC Radio 4 series The Reunion. She has also, on occasion, presented Start the Week on BBC Radio 4.

In 2021, Wark was one of the main presenters of the BBC's election results coverage, alongside Huw Edwards. She presented from Edinburgh with the programme covering results from all the UK elections that took place on Thursday 6 May 2021, including the 2021 Scottish Parliament election and local council elections in England.

On 19 October 2023, the BBC announced that Wark would be standing down as presenter of Newsnight after the next general election. The next general election was held on 4 July 2024, and Wark's final day on Newsnight was Friday 12 July 2024. She presented the show as normal; but towards the end of the programme, actor Alan Cumming and Nick Watt (BBC Newsnight Political Editor) and others paid tributes to her, recognising her 30 years on the show. Tributes were also given from previous colleagues, her family and previous guests.

== Honours and awards ==
Wark was named journalist of the year by BAFTA Scotland in 1993 and Best Television Presenter in 1997. She was also nominated for the prestigious Richard Dimbleby Award for Best Television Presenter (Factual, Features and News) in the BAFTAS 2000.

She was listed as one of the fifty best-dressed over 50s by The Guardian in March 2013. Wark was elected a Fellow of the Royal Society of Edinburgh in March 2017.

At the June 2023 Graduation Ceremonies at University of St Andrews, Wark was awarded Doctor of Letters (DLitt), in recognition of her outstanding career in journalism and broadcasting.

Wark was presented with the BAFTA Fellowship at the 2025 British Academy Television Awards on 11 May 2025. In a statement accompanying the announcement, BAFTA CEO Jane Millichip said, "I am beyond delighted to present this year's BAFTA Fellowship to Kirsty Wark. Kirsty’s dedication is unwavering when it comes to telling the stories that really matter. Her legacy is unmatched in the world of news and current affairs broadcasting. Her ability to inform and engage her readers, listeners and viewers is truly inspiring. And she does all this with enormous charm and wit. We are thrilled to celebrate her continued and lasting impact on the industry and beyond."

== Public controversies ==
Wark is regarded as being close to the Labour Party. Donald Dewar, Scottish Labour politician and former First Minister of Scotland, a close friend, appointed her to the Scottish Parliament Building Design Selection Panel, which chose Enric Miralles' design for the new parliament. Questioned by the Fraser Inquiry, set up to investigate the building's cost overruns, she said: "There was no way that we were making a decision on economically the most advantageous tender; you would have ended up with a shed . . . it was [about] getting a building which was the most exciting, innovative building . . ." In 2003, Wark-Clements produced a film on the building, with critics accusing Wark of a conflict of interest.

In January 2005, she invited Labour MSP Jack McConnell, then Scotland's First Minister, and his family to stay at her Mallorcan holiday home over the New Year period. McConnell, a long-time friend of Wark and husband Clements before holding office, was cleared of any improprieties when the Scottish Parliament's Standards Committee deemed he received no financial benefits from the holidays. Wark's editor on Newsnight offered his support, stating "Many people in the media have friends who have gone on to hold office. The important issue is your ability to ask tough questions and that is not a problem with Kirsty Wark or anybody else on the programme."

Wark and Clements were the subject of media coverage regarding his use of Wark's former personal assistant to monitor e-mails covertly at RDF Media after he left following an acrimonious dispute about a non-compete deal.

In June 2007, Wark clashed with Scottish First Minister Alex Salmond in an interview, over his response to a memorandum of understanding between the UK Government and Libya regarding prisoner exchanges. Salmond feared that this could include Abdelbaset al-Megrahi, who was convicted by a Scottish court in the Netherlands for the 1988 bombing of Pan Am Flight 103 over Lockerbie. The BBC received 120 formal complaints, and issued a public apology to Salmond regretting Wark's "rude and dismissive" tone; Salmond accepted the BBC's apology. According to the BBC, viewers questioned the premise of the interview and that Wark's line of questioning was too aggressive and therefore discourteous. According to Newsnight editor Peter Barron, time constraints forced Wark to end the questioning abruptly, leading him to perceive her behaviour as "rude and dismissive".

In October 2013, Wark interviewed Guardian journalist Glenn Greenwald about his reporting of the NSA and GCHQ cyber-spying programs leaked by Edward Snowden. The interview was seen as openly hostile in which "Wark unabashedly made the case for the prosecution, interrogating Greenwald about his reporting and Edward Snowden." Greenwald later wrote that Wark and other journalists have focused "almost entirely on the process questions surrounding the reporting rather than the substance of the revelations" about NSA surveillance and privacy invasions "and in the process made some quite dubious claims that come straight from the mouths of government officials".

On 3 November 2016, Andrew Rosindell, a Conservative MP, argued in an early day motion for a return to the broadcasting of the national anthem (titled "God Save the Queen") at the end of BBC One transmissions each day (the practice was dropped in 1997, ostensibly due to BBC One adopting 24-hour broadcasting by simulcasting BBC News 24 overnight, rendering closedown obsolete), to commemorate the Brexit vote and Britain's subsequent withdrawing from the European Union. At the evening of the same day, BBC Two's Newsnight programme ended its nightly broadcast with that night's host, Wark, saying that they were "incredibly happy to oblige" Rosindell's request, and then played a clip of the Sex Pistols' similarly named song, much to Rosindell's discontent.

Wark attracted further controversy in relation to Alex Salmond in 2020. She presented a documentary about Salmond's trial on sexual assault charges, for which he was acquitted. The documentary aired several months after the end of the trial and featured both supporters and detractors of Alex Salmond reflecting on the case. Some of the women who accused Salmond spoke about the case for the first time. The programme received over 900 complaints from those who believed it was biased against Salmond. The BBC said that the outcome of the trial was "fairly reflected in the programme", with the programme aiming to look at the wider political consequences of the case rather than rerunning Salmond's trial. The BBC also said that Salmond had been asked to take part in the programme but had refused. The BBC said the programme contained Jim Sillars and Kenny MacAskill, who were supporters of Salmond. A later news story said that Salmond was considering taking legal action against the BBC, and possibly against Wark.

In October 2023 Wark was widely criticized when she interviewed Husam Zomlot, the head of the Palestinian Mission to the United Kingdom, a politician with no ties whatsoever to Hamas. Zomlot described how six of his family members had been killed by Israeli airstrikes on the Gaza Strip during the Gaza war. Wark responded: "I'm sorry for your own personal loss. I mean, can I just be clear, though, you cannot condone the killing of civilians in Israel, can you?"

== Books ==
Wark has written two novels, The Legacy Of Elizabeth Pringle and The House By The Loch.

== Personal life ==
Wark married television producer Alan Clements (born 1961) on 30 September 1989, after meeting him on the BBC Scotland programme Left, Right, and Centre. They have a daughter (born November 1990) and a son (born March 1992). She lives in Kelvinside, Glasgow. She previously owned a holiday home in Alaró, Mallorca, for 17 years, but sold it in 2019. Wark and Clements founded independent TV production company Wark-Clements in 1990, which in May 2004 was merged with fellow Scots broadcaster Muriel Gray's Ideal World to form IWC Media. In December 2005, Wark and Gray severed their connections with IWC Media after RDF Media bought the company.
