= Manuel Hassassian =

Palestinian-Armenian academic and diplomat

Head of the Palestinian Mission to the United Kingdom
- In office 2005 – October 2018
- President: Mahmoud Abbas
- Preceded by: Afif Safieh
- Succeeded by: Husam Zomlot

Personal details
- Born: Manuel Sarkis Hassassian; 28 December 1953 (age 72) East Jerusalem, Jordan
- Education: American University of Beirut; Toledo University; University of Cincinnati

Manuel Sarkis Hassassian (born 28 December 1953, Jerusalem) is a Palestinian-Armenian professor, who from late 2005 to October 2018 was the Palestinian Authority's diplomatic representative to the United Kingdom, after being appointed to the position by Palestinian Authority President Mahmoud Abbas.

Hassassian was awarded an honorary doctorate by the University of Reims, France, and nominated by the Center of International Development and Conflict Management, University of Maryland, for the Gleitzman Middle East Award. In March 2015, he was awarded the Grassroot Diplomat Initiative Award under the social driver category for his extensive work on promoting the rights of the Palestinian people as the country's representative in the UK.

In a speech in the UK Parliament in 2013, Hassassian said: "I'm reaching the conclusion that the Jews are the children of God, the only children of God and the Promised Land is being paid by God! I have started to believe this because nobody is stopping Israel building its messianic dream of Eretz Israel to the point I believe that maybe God is on their side." A pro-Israel activist then challenged Hassassian over what he had said. The Labour Party leader, Jeremy Corbyn, in a subsequent speech, defended Hassassian in the face of what Corbyn called "deliberate misrepresentations by people for whom English was a first language, when it isn't for the ambassador." Corbyn said:

"We had a meeting in Parliament in which Manuel [Hassassian] made an incredibly powerful and passionate and effective speech about the history of Palestine. ... This was dutifully recorded by the thankfully silent Zionists who were in the audience on that occasion; and then came up and berated him afterwards for what he had said. They clearly had two problems. One is they don't want to study history and, secondly, having lived in this country for a very long time, probably all their lives, they don't understand English irony either. Manuel does understand English irony and uses it very very effectively."

Some commentators claimed that this statement was antisemitic.

== See also ==
- Palestine–United Kingdom relations
