= A Question of Genius =

British game show

- Genre: Quiz show
- Presented by: Kirsty Wark
- Country of origin: United Kingdom
- Original language: English
- No. of series: 2
- No. of episodes: 45

Production
- Production location: BBC Pacific Quay
- Running time: 45 minutes
- Production company: BBC Scotland

Original release
- Network: BBC Two
- Release: 16 March 2009 – 4 June 2010

A Question of Genius is a game show hosted by Kirsty Wark and produced by BBC Scotland. The show was broadcast on BBC Two. It was recorded at BBC Pacific Quay in Glasgow. It ran from 16 March 2009 to 4 June 2010.

== Round 1: (Series 1) ==
Each week there is a pool of an unspecified number of contestants. Each show was designed to begin with 10 contestants but during filming this round was determined to be unaired and used as a 'qualifier' to the 'main show'. 8 of these contestants play each day. The first round that is aired is actually the second round for the contestants.

== Main Game ==
=== Round 1: A Question of Speed (Series 2) ===
Played the same as A Question of Knowledge in series 1 (see below).

=== Round 2: A Question of Knowledge (Series 1) ===
In this round, the six/eight players are given a starter question. The first person to get it right is given a follow-up question on the same subject and must choose a difficulty level between 1 and 3 (between 1 and 5 in the first series). If they get the follow-up right, they get the same number of points as their level of difficulty. However, other players can also buzz in on the follow-up and steal the points. The first five players (six in the first series) to get five points go through to the next round. The remaining player is eliminated. In the first series the other two contestants came back for the first round on the next show.

=== Round 2: A Question of Judgement ===
As with the first round, the five/six players are given a question. The player who answers the question correctly gets the chance to answer a question related to that question and have to choose which level they want for that question, then they choose which other player they wish to play against in a head-to-head on that question. The person who buzzes in with the correct answer gets the points. The first four to reach 6 points go through to the next round. The remaining player is eliminated. In the first series the other two contestants came back for the first round on the next show.

=== Round 3: A Question of Knowledge (Series 2) ===
As with the last two rounds, they are given a starter question. Whoever gets it right gets three follow-up questions on the same topic. The first follow-up question is worth one point, the second one is worth two points, and the remainder question is worth three points. Itf they get the starter and the follow-up questions right, they get the right number of points and go through to the next round. If they get one of their follow-ups wrong, another starter question is given. However, the other players cannot interject during the follow-ups. The first three to get seven points go through to the next round.

=== Round 4: A Question of Pressure ===
The remaining 4 players are each given 60 seconds to answer as many questions as possible. They are given the category and have to choose which level they want answer. If they answer correctly, they get the points, but if they answer wrongly, the first of the other 3 players to buzz in can steal the points. The 2 players who get the most points go through to the next round. The other 2 have to wait until the next day until they can play again.

In the second series the remaining 3 players are each given 60 seconds to answer as many questions as possible. They are given the category and have to choose which level they want answer. If they answer correctly, they get the points, but if they answer wrongly, the first of the other 3 players to buzz in can steal the points. The person that gets the highest score goes through to answer their "Question of Genius".

=== Round 5: A Question of Strategy (Series 1) ===
The remaining 2 players go head-to-head to answer questions on a subject. When the subject is given, the players have to type in which level question (between 1 and 5) they would like. The player who chose the higher level gets to answer their question. If they get it right, they get the relevant number of points. If they get it wrong, the other player gets a question from that category at the level that they chose. If they get that right, they get the points. If both players go for the same level, the question is asked with both players on the buzzer. The first to reach 15 points goes to the final round (From 19 March 2009, this was dropped to 10 points). The other player has to wait until the next day until he/she can play again.

== Final Round: A Question of Genius ==
=== Series 1 ===
In the final round, the contestant has 90 seconds to answer 5 questions correctly. The question difficulty goes up one level each time a question is answered correctly. Each level has 2 categories, of which the player chooses which one he/she likes. If they answer correctly, they move to the next level. If they answer wrongly, they have to answer another question at the same level until they get one right. If all 5 are answered correctly, then they can win £5,000 on the "Genius Question". If only 4 are answered they go for £2,000, 3 for £1,500, 2 for £1,000 and 1 for £500.

=== Series 2 ===
The question is worth 100 times the score they got in the last round, A Question of Pressure (e.g. 10 points scored is worth £1000).

In the final round, the contestant is given a question which they answer on their specialist subject. If they get the answer right, they get all the money. If they are doubtful, they are asked if they want four choices. But if they take the four choices, the amount of money is then halved. If they get it wrong they do not win any money at all.

In the first series, the contestant's name was added to a leaderboard with the top 10 contestants returning for the final.

The winning contestant in the second series returned for the next episode. There were no limits on how many times a contestant could win or on how much money someone could win.

== Final ==
The first series was won by Pam Thomas. She got her question of genius wrong but won a trophy to mark her victory.

== Transmissions ==
Series	Start date	End date	Episodes
1	16 March 2009	17 April 2009	25
2	10 May 2010	4 June 2010	20
