= Afif Safieh =

Palestinian diplomat (born 1950)

Afif Safieh عفيف صافية
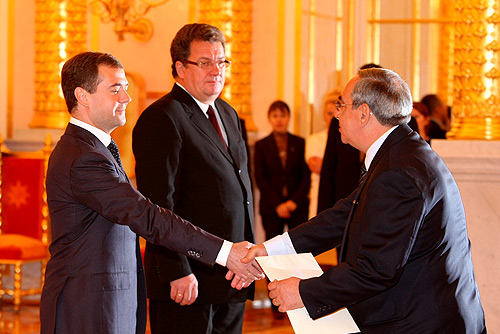
- Afif Safieh presents his credentials to President Dmitry Medvedev in September 2008.

Head of the Palestinian Mission to the United Kingdom
- In office 1990–2005
- Succeeded by: Manuel Hassassian

Personal details
- Born: 4 May 1950 (age 76) East Jerusalem, Jordanian West Bank
- Education: Université catholique de Louvain; Sciences Po

Afif Safieh (Arabic: عفيف صافية; born 4 May 1950) is a Palestinian diplomat. He has served as a Palestinian delegate to the Netherlands (1987–1990), to the United Kingdom (1990–2005), the Holy See, Vatican (1995–2005), and in Washington, D.C. as the head of the PLO mission (2005–2008). He was most recently the Palestinian ambassador to the Russian Federation.

Safieh is an experienced diplomat, having served in the three most politically significant capitals: London, Washington, and Moscow. Before this, he was deputy director of the PLO Observer Mission to the United Nations Office at Geneva.

== Early life and education ==
Safieh was born in Jerusalem in 1950 to a Palestinian Roman Catholic family. He studied at the Catholic University of Louvain in Belgium, then in the Institut d'Etudes Politiques in Paris. During this time, he headed the Belgian branch of the General Union of Palestinian Students (GUPS) between 1969 and 1971; and the French branch of GUPS between 1974 and 1975.

== Career ==
In May 2008, Afif Safieh was appointed to serve as the Palestinian ambassador to the Russian Federation, he presented his letter of credentials to President Medvedev on September 18, 2008. It was reported in March 2009 that he had been dismissed from this post by Palestinian president Mahmoud Abbas, apparently because he had spoken at a rally organised by Hamas to protest against Israeli actions during the 2008–2009 Israel–Gaza conflict.

In September 2014 he was awarded by the Bethlehem University the degree of Doctor of Humanities, Honoris Causa.

In the 6th Fateh Conference in 2009 and the 7th Fateh Conference in 2016, he was elected Member of the Revolutionary Council, which is the parliament of Fatah and since then has been Deputy Commissioner for International Relations.

In 2018, Safieh gave a speech to Sinn Féin in Ireland at the Ardfheis.

== Personal life ==
Safieh is married and has two daughters.

== See also ==
- Palestinian Christians
