= Husam Zomlot =

Palestinian diplomat

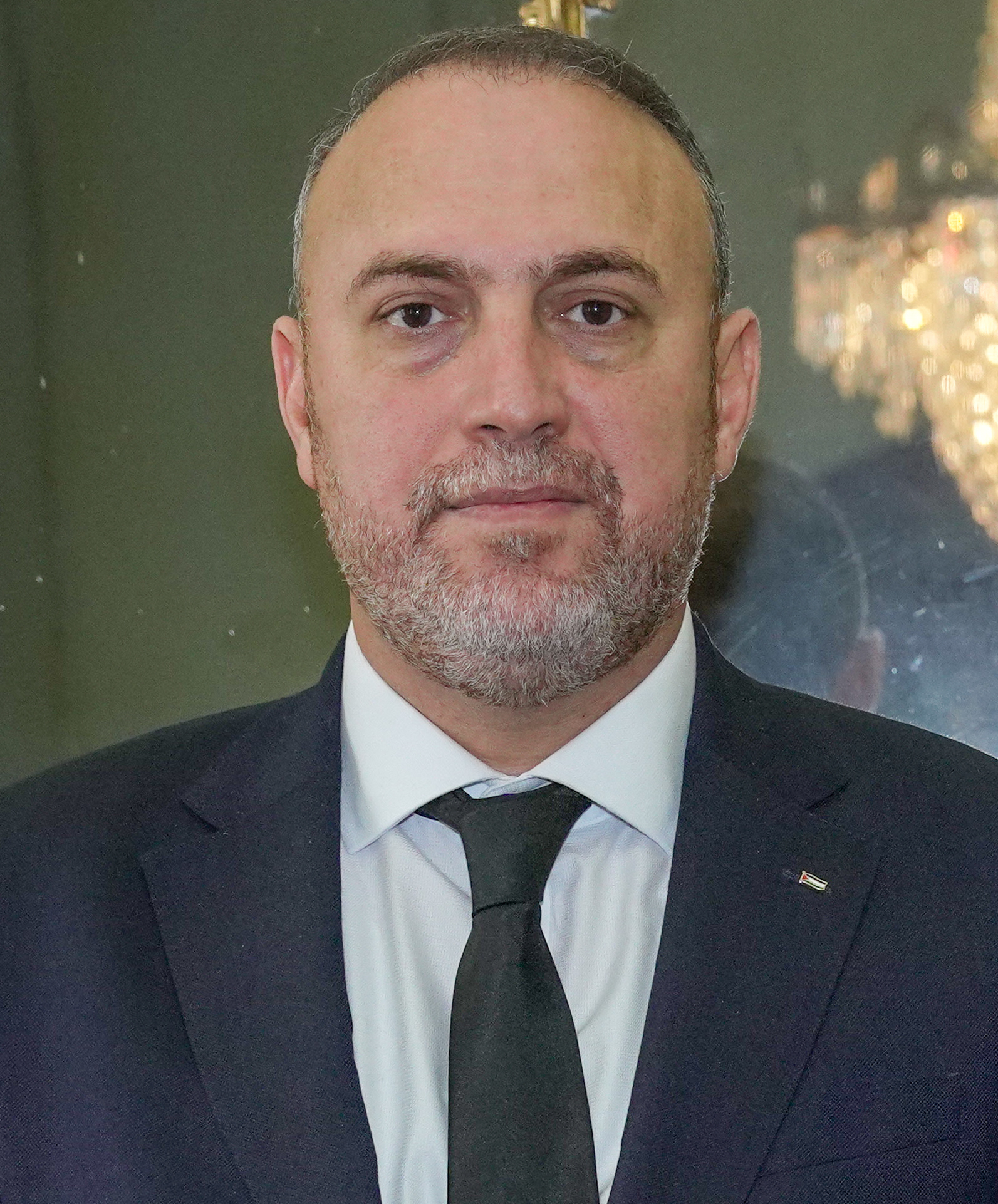
- Husam Zomlot in November 2023

Palestinian Ambassador to the United Kingdom
- Incumbent
- Assumed office October 2018 (as head of mission); January 2026 (as ambassador)
- President: Mahmoud Abbas
- Preceded by: Manuel Hassassian

Personal details
- Born: Husam Said Zomlot; 31 August 1973 (age 53) Rafah Camp, Gaza Strip, Palestine
- Party: Fatah
- Education: Birzeit University (BA); London School of Economics (MSc); SOAS University of London (PhD)

Husam Said Zomlot (Arabic: حسام سعيد زملط, born 31 August 1973) is a Palestinian diplomat, academic and economist. He was appointed Head of the Palestinian Mission to the United Kingdom in October 2018. He has served as the Palestinian ambassador to the United Kingdom since January 2026. Before his posting to the UK, he served as head of the PLO mission to the United States that was closed by President Donald Trump's administration.

Zomlot is a senior member of Fatah, the main Palestinian political movement, and a strategic adviser to Palestinian President Mahmoud Abbas. He previously served as director of Fatah's commission for foreign relations.

Before entering politics, Zomlot was a professor of public policy at Birzeit University. He was a post-doctoral fellow at Harvard University in the US and an instructor at the University of London. He also worked as an economist with United Nations Special Coordinator's Office in Palestine.

== Early life ==
Zomlot was born in Shaburah refugee camp, a United Nations Relief and Works Agency camp in Rafah in the occupied Gaza Strip in 1973. His parents were originally from the village of Simsim but were expelled in 1948. "In 1948, my father lost his home and his land and as a result I was born in a Rafah refugee camp," Zomlot told a conference on the occasion of the 70th anniversary of the United Nations Work and Refugee Agency, (UNRWA). "Millions [of refugees] suffer the most precarious existence of them all. Nothing is more hurtful to a human being than forced exile."

Zomlot became politically active while taking his undergraduate degree at Birzeit University outside Ramallah in the occupied West Bank. There he became a representative of Fatah’s student movement at the university during the First Intifada.

In 1999, while studying in London, he was elected as president of the General Union of Palestinian Students in the UK.

== Academic career ==
Zomlot was educated at Birzeit University in Ramallah. After receiving his undergraduate degree he worked as an economist with the Office of the United Nations Special Coordinator for the Middle East Peace Process, UNSCO. He was there tasked with monitoring economic developments, propose economic policy alternatives and provide briefings to the United Nations Secretary-General, Kofi Annan at that time.

In 2000, he completed a master's degree in development studies at the London School of Economics (LSE). He received his PhD in International Political Economy from the School of Oriental and African Studies (SOAS) of the University of London in 2007.

Before joining Birzeit as professor of public policy in 2012 he was Scholar in Residence at Harvard's Belfer Center for Science and International Affairs, John F. Kennedy School of Government (2008–2010).

== Political career ==
Zomlot served as a spokesperson for the Palestinian delegation during the statehood campaign at the United Nations in New York in 2011.

He was appointed ambassador-at-large for the State of Palestine that same year, and also served as director of Fatah's commission for foreign relations.

He became strategic adviser to President of the State of Palestine Mahmoud Abbas in 2015 before being elected to Fatah's Revolutionary Council in 2016.

In 2017, Zomlot was appointed as envoy to the United States, taking over from Maen Rashid Areikat.

His tenure there was cut short after the Trump administration decided to close the PLO mission in Washington DC and subsequently recognise Jerusalem as Israel's capital. In December 2017, the White House announced its intention to move the US embassy to Israel to the city from Tel Aviv. The Palestinian leadership countered by boycotting ties with the US administration.

In 2018, Zomlot was appointed Head of Mission to the United Kingdom.

=== Palestinian Envoy to the United States ===
Zomlot was appointed Palestinian envoy to the US in March 2017. There followed a period of intense bilateral contacts, when Palestinian President Mahmoud Abbas and US President Donald Trump met four times in the period between May and September 2017.

But efforts came to a halt when the White House in November 2017 informed Zomlot of its intention to close the PLO mission in Washington DC and in December announced its recognition of Jerusalem as the capital of Israel and plans to move the US embassy in Israel from Tel-Aviv to Jerusalem. The move undermines a significant Palestinian policy that the eastern part of the city, occupied by Israel in 1967, should eventually serve as the capital of Palestine.

The announcement sparked protests in the occupied Palestinian areas. A spokesperson for Fatah said it would move for the US to be disqualified as co-sponsor of any peace process or political process.

Said Zomlot at the time: "You didn’t take Jerusalem off the table. You took the table altogether. No one, no Palestinian, would ever be able to sit on that table. Good luck!"

In September 2018, the PLO's representative mission in Washington, D.C., was closed but by then Zomlot had already been recalled to Ramallah. As a result, what would eventually become the Trump Peace to Prosperity plan for peace between Israelis and Palestinians was developed only with input from Benjamin Netanyahu's Israeli government.

Zomlot nevertheless argued that a recalibration of Palestinian-US relations could have three positive outcomes: "it frees the Palestinians from the shackles of a failed 27-year-old, American-led peace process… it provides an opportunity to repeal a 1987 law designating the Palestine Liberation Organization as a terrorist organization… [it] will help redirect Palestinian attention [to] long-term engagement directly with the American people".

=== Head of the Palestinian Mission to the United Kingdom ===
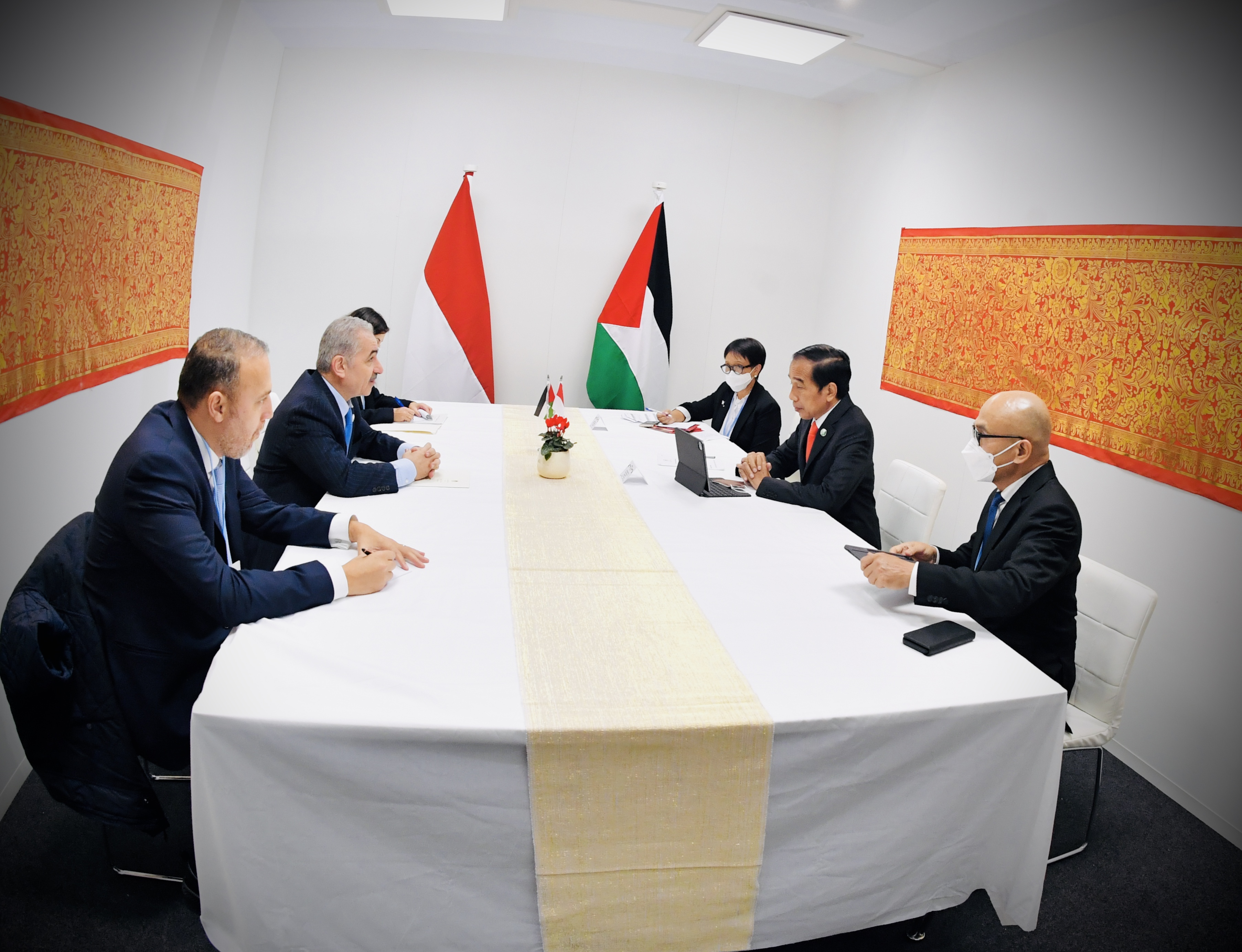
Palestinian Prime Minister Mohammad Shtayyeh and Husam Zomlot with Indonesian President Joko Widodo in Glasgow, Scotland on 1 November 2021

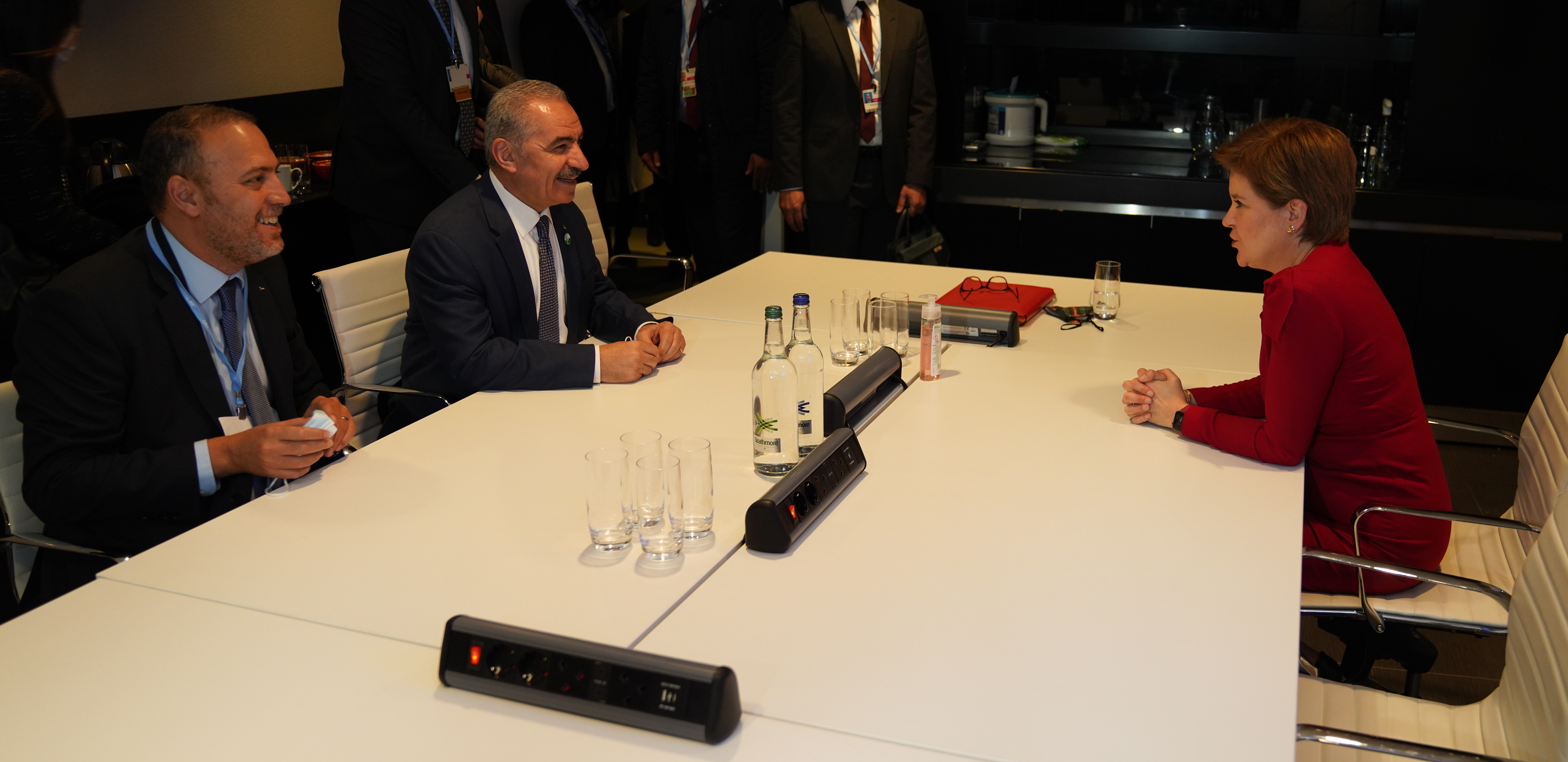
Shtayyeh and Husam Zomlot with Scotland's First Minister Nicola Sturgeon on 2 November 2021

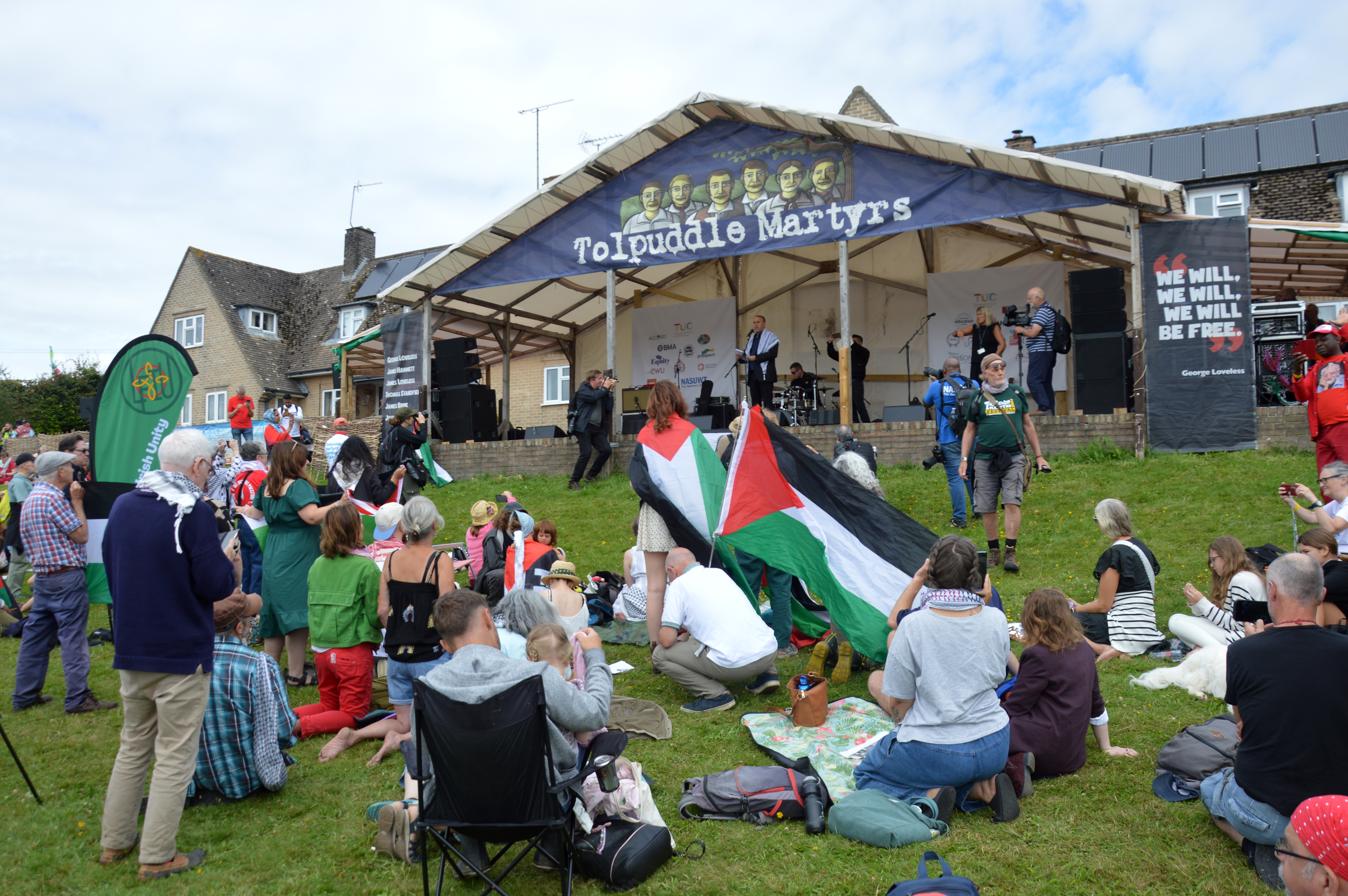
Zomlot speaks at the Tolpuddle Martyrs' Festival, a trade union festival, in 2024.

Zomlot was appointed Head of Mission to the United Kingdom in October 2018. He arrived in the middle of Britain's process of leaving the EU and in his first year-and-a-half experienced two different Conservative governments and two different opposition leaders.

Since his appointment, bilateral Palestinian-British relations have deepened. In spite of US administration moves to defund both the Palestinian Authority and UNRWA, British aid to both has continued (and doubled in the case of UNRWA) while the British government continues to support a two-state solution to the Palestinian-Israeli conflict as mandated by international law.

As ambassador, he criticised the Israeli government during the 2021 Israel–Palestine crisis.

In 2023, Sky News issued a public apology after presenter Kay Burley had falsely quoted Zomlot as saying "Israel had it coming" multiple times in regards to the 2023 Hamas attack on Israel which gave a misleading impression that he believed they deserved it. His actual quote was:

The loss of civilian life is tragic… [on] all sides and what is happening is extremely worrying and very tragic. As we speak, the loss of [lives], you’ve counted 70 Israeli deaths, there [are] more than 200 Palestinian deaths so far, more than 1,600 entire residential compounds are being wiped out. This is a war crime committed by Israel. And what is more tragic or equally tragic is the blindness and the deafness of the world and the international community for so many years of the warnings we have been saying that this was coming. Israel knew that this was coming their way. We the national movement of Palestine, the PLO [Palestine Liberation Organisation], have found a different part 30 years ago, we have committed to what the world asks us; recognise Israel, commit to negotiations of non-violence… Israel was expected to do one thing only, roll back its occupation. It’s a consequence.

In February 2024, BBC Newsnight presenter Kirsty Wark interviewed Zomlot, a politician with no links to Hamas. Zomlot described how six of his wife's family members had been killed by Israeli airstrikes on the Gaza Strip during the Gaza war.

=== Palestinian Ambassador to the United Kingdom ===
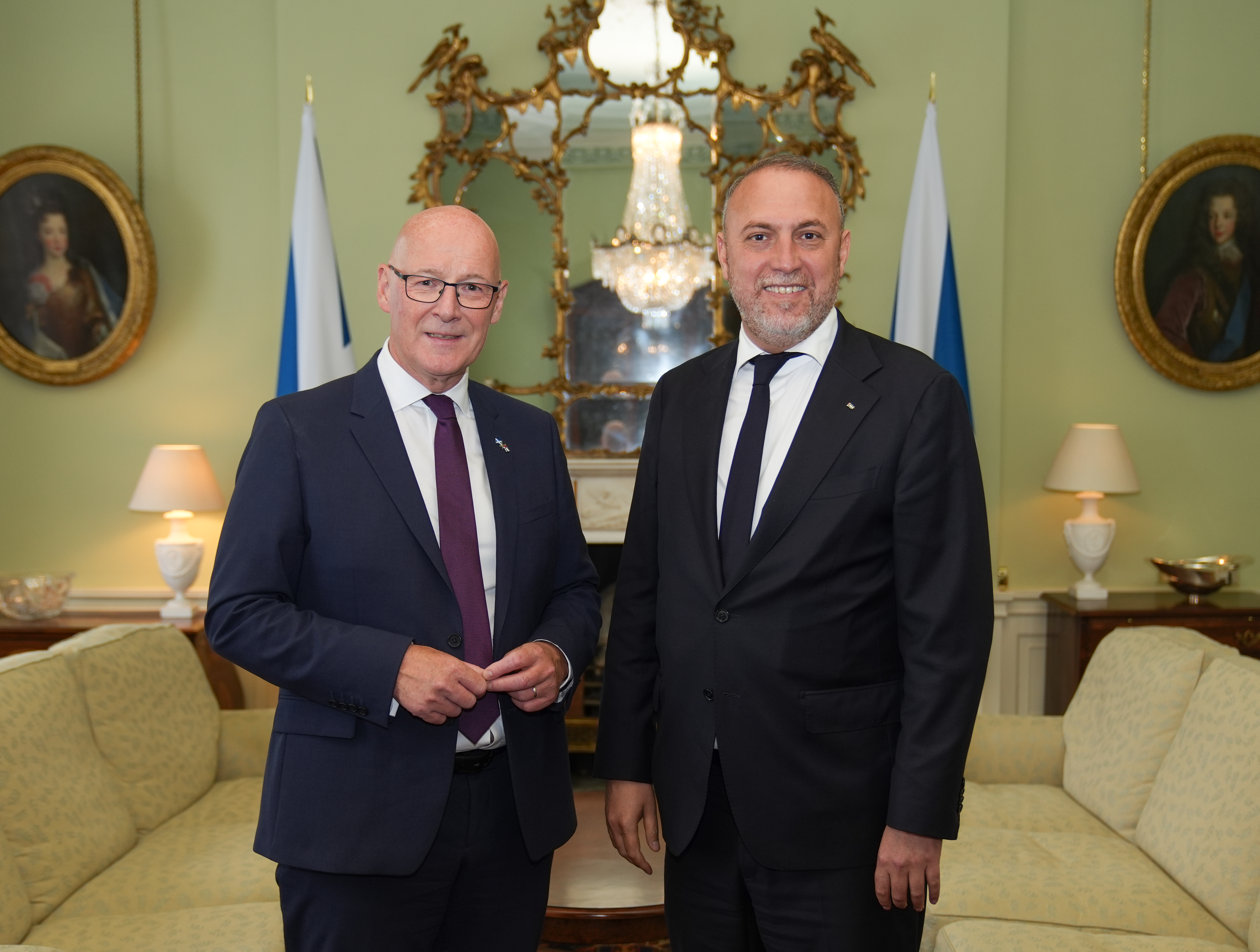
Zomlot with John Swinney in July 2026

Following the United Kingdom’s recognition of the State of Palestine and the subsequent upgrading of diplomatic relations to an embassy, he became the Palestinian ambassador to the United Kingdom.

== Personal life ==
An image of the 7-year-old cousin of Zomlot's wife, Sidra Hassouna, who hails from the noble Hassouna family went viral during the Gaza war, showing her corpse in Rafah hanging from a wall following an Israeli airstrike.

== Other work ==
Zomlot is co-founder of the Palestinian Strategy Group, which was established in 2008. A Palestinian think-tank, the PSG comprises more than 100 members selected from a wide range of crucial Palestinians from different political, professional, and geographic backgrounds.

The General Union of Palestinian Students (GUPS) in the UK accused Zomlot of appointing several of his relatives to positions in the Palestinian embassy.

The GUPS criticised Zomlot for calling the police to the Palestinian embassy, where they arrested a number of Palestinian students. GUPS said the embassy security staff had attacked the students prior to the arrival of the police.
