= Background of the Rafah offensive =

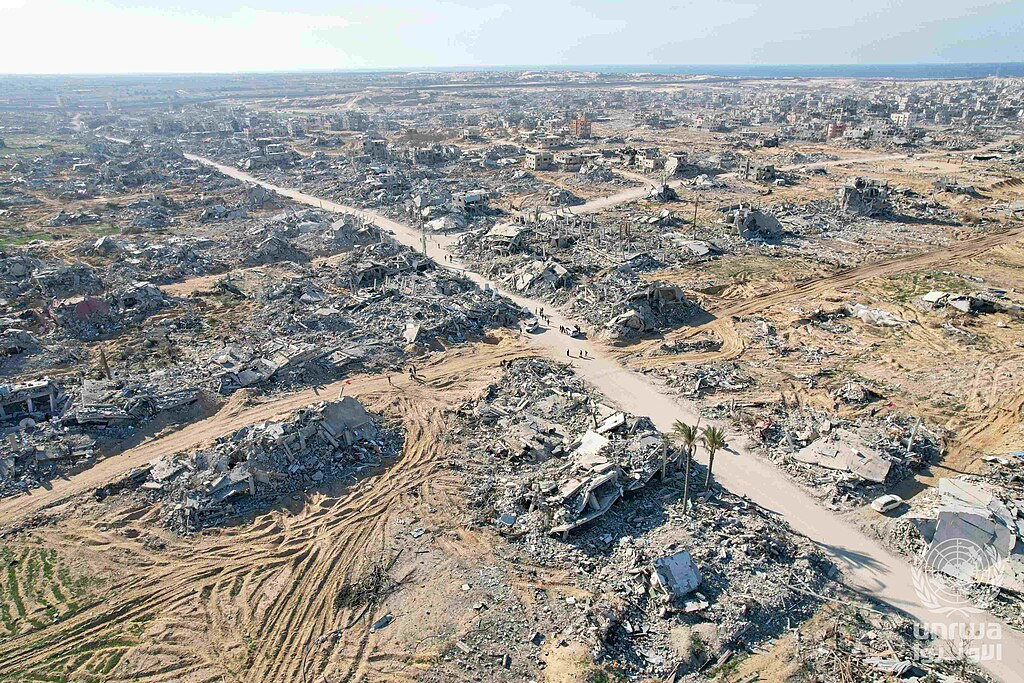
An aerial view showing destruction in Rafah after Israeli forces withdrawal and as the ceasefire took hold, Gaza Strip

Before the Rafah offensive, Israel conducted airstrikes and threatened to invade the city as part of its invasion of the Gaza Strip during the Gaza war which began with the Hamas-led attack on Israel on 7 October 2023. Intentions to invade were declared in February, meeting backlash from the international community because of the estimated 1.4 million refugees sheltering in the city.

== Timeline ==
Airstrikes on Rafah started on 8 October 2023, and continued throughout the war. On 31 December, Israeli Prime Minister Benjamin Netanyahu announced Israel's intention to capture the Philadelphi Corridor, a buffer zone between Gaza and Egypt. On 27 January 2024, Israel notified Egypt that it was planning to take control of the corridor, which Egypt was strongly opposed to. On 29 January, The Jerusalem Post reported that an invasion of Rafah 'would take time'. On 30 January, Israeli intelligence chiefs met with Egyptian officials in Cairo to discuss an offensive in Rafah.

=== February 2024 ===
Following Egypt's refusal to open its borders, displaced people had been fearing an assault on Rafah, as "there is no farther south they can move." Al Jazeera reported people in Rafah were in a state of disbelief, as "it seems they have no other place to go". Volker Türk, the UN human rights chair, stated he was "deeply worried by Israel defence minister's remarks on military push to Rafah. This sets off alarm bells for massive civilian casualties and further displacement". UNOCHA reported on 2 February that "Rafah is a pressure cooker of despair, and we fear for what comes next." The "level of panic" amongst displaced people in Rafah rose after Yoav Gallant stated, "Victory won't be complete unless the military expands into Rafah."

The Palestinian Foreign Ministry stated an Israeli assault on Rafah would lead to "the annihilation of about 1.5 million Palestinians, or an attempt to displace them". A Norwegian Refugee Council representative stated, "People in Rafah are trapped between Israeli tanks and the Egyptian border. I don't think the announcement of an evacuation plan is realistic. Where would people go?" On 10 February, an unnamed Israeli official stated Palestinians in Rafah would be evacuated northward. On 10 February, people in Rafah reportedly began fleeing to Deir el-Balah. A Human Rights Watch researcher stated, "This evacuation would be unlawful if it is ordered". In an interview with ABC News, Netanyahu stated Palestinians in Rafah would be granted "safe passage" out of the city.

On 12 February, Thomas White, the UN's Gaza relief director, stated that Israel's offensive in Rafah would result in "a million people [moving] in the Gaza Strip into areas that are not set up to accommodate them". The Palestine Red Crescent Society stated, "There is no safe place at all and there is no way to evacuate." Tareq Abu Azzoum, a journalist on the ground, stated Rafah was functioning like a "massive shelter" and warned of a humanitarian catastrophe in the city if the Israeli military were to attack, due to the large number of children and elderly people unable to easily evacuate.

On 14 February, the United Nations said it would not be involved in an evacuation of Rafah, stating, "The UN does not participate in forced, non-voluntary evacuations. There is no plan at this time to facilitate the evacuation of civilians". On 10 March, Israel Katz told Israeli public radio that the U.S. wanted to see a Rafah evacuation plan before an invasion. On 23 April 2024, an International Committee of the Red Cross official stated, "When we see the level of destruction in the middle area (of Gaza) and in the north, it's not clear to us where people will be moved to..." The same day, satellite imagery showed a compound of tents being built near Khan Younis.

On 2 February, Israel announced that it would begin moving into Rafah, after declaring "victory" in Khan Younis.

On 3 February, Israeli attacks targeted eastern and central Rafah, reportedly killing at least twenty-eight people. At 4 February, The Palestinian Health Ministry reported that 92 people had been killed by Israeli attacks on Rafah. At least two girls were killed on an attack at a kindergarten. The intensifying Israeli attacks were reportedly centered in eastern Rafah.

On 7 February, Axios reported that Israeli Defence Minister Yoav Gallant stated to the U.S. Secretary of State Antony Blinken that Israel would soon begin expanded ground operations in Rafah. In Rafah, an Israeli airstrike bombed a civilian car next to an entertainment event for displaced children, reportedly killing at least one person. Eleven people were killed in overnight airstrikes. Six Palestinian policemen were reportedly killed while clearing the road for an aid truck.

In February 2024, multiple countries and organizations expressed concerns about the offensive.

On 8 February, The U.S. National Security Council spokesman John Kirby stated, "Any major military operation in Rafah at this time... would be a disaster, and we would not support it". The U.S. requested Israel to create a plan and prioritise the safety of civilians which had increased due to refugees from other areas of Gaza. U.S. National Security Council spokesman John Kirby stated that they have not observed signs of an imminent Israeli offensive into Gaza.

Netanyahu ordered the IDF to prepare to invade Rafah. An intense bombing campaign in west Rafah was reported, reportedly indicating an expanding ground invasion. At least twelve people were killed in airstrikes in southern Rafah.

On 9 February, Netanyahu ordered the IDF to plan for the "evacuation of the population" from Rafah. Israeli Prime Minister's Office stated that elimination of Hamas remains impossible without the destruction of the four Hamas battalions in Rafah which is the last major population center in Gaza not occupied by the IDF. Doctors Without Borders issued a strong warning in response, stating, "Israel's declared ground offensive on Rafah would be catastrophic and must not proceed. Today’s announcement marks a dramatic escalation in this ongoing massacre." Egypt sent 40 tanks to the Rafah border. Eight people were killed and at least eighteen wounded in Israeli strikes on residential buildings in Rafah.

On 10 February, Haaretz and Channel 12 stated Israel's plans for the Rafah invasion were not yet finalized. Two Palestinians were killed after an Israeli strike on a police car in Rafah. An unnamed Israeli official stated Palestinians in Rafah would be evacuated back northward. At least 28 people were killed in Rafah by overnight Israeli attacks.

Egypt warned Israel that if it invaded Rafah, the Egypt–Israel peace treaty would be suspended. Egypt also stepped up security on its border with Israel and sent 40 tanks and armored personnel carriers to northeastern Sinai. Israel called up reservists for the operation. Israeli airstrikes in Rafah killed two Hamas policemen, three senior officers, and a senior commander in the Rafah district.

On 11 February, In a call with Benjamin Netanyahu, Biden stated Israel could invade Rafah with U.S. support when they had a "credible and executable plan" in place. Tedros Adhanom Ghebreyesus, the head of the World Health Organization, stated reports of Israel's impending invasion were "extremely worrying". Satellite imagery indicated Egypt had strengthened the border, including building earthen berms and security checkpoints. At least 40 people were reported killed in east Rafah. Al Jazeera journalist Hani Mahmoud described Israel's attacks on Rafah police as an intentional attempt to create civil disorder.

Israel conducted a nighttime raid on Rafah and rescued two hostages. To divert attention during the operation, bombing increased, killing more than 67 people according to the Gaza Health Ministry. One survivor of Israel's bombing stated, "We heard the sound of explosions, like hell falling down on civilians". The event coincided with Super Bowl LVIII, allegedly to distract Americans.

Israeli airstrikes hit the area around the Kuwait Hospital. During a press brief with U.S. president Joe Biden, King Abdullah II of Jordan stated the world "cannot afford an Israeli attack on Rafah". Stéphane Dujarric criticized Israel's stated plan to evacuate people northward, stating, "You can't send people back to areas that are littered with unexploded ordnance, not to mention a lack of shelter". ICC prosecutor Karim Khan stated he was "deeply concerned" by Israel's bombardment of Rafah.

More than 100 people were killed due to Israeli airstrikes targeting areas in Rafah and helicopters firing machine guns along the border areas. An Al Jazeera correspondent reporting on the ground stated, "Warplanes that covered the sky, dropping barrages in a fiery belt that crushed the bodies of the displaced in their tents." Hamas condemned the action as a "horrific massacre" by Israel against civilians in Rafah.

Displaced people in Rafah began fleeing to other parts of the Gaza Strip, including Khan Younis and Maghazi. Two Al Jazeera journalists were wounded by an Israeli drone missile while documenting living conditions in Rafah, with one reporter losing a leg. Four people were killed by an Israeli bomb in Rafah's Brazil neighborhood.

UNOCHA reported that displaced people were continuing to flee to Deir el-Balah, as well as to the Nuseirat refugee camp. Intensified Israeli strikes in eastern Rafah were reported, including in agricultural areas near the Egyptian border. Egypt continued on its construction of a concrete walled enclosure along its border with Gaza.

The Wall Street Journal and The New York Times reported that south of Rafah, Egypt was building a refugee camp surrounded by five-meter-high concrete walls for over 100,000 people.

During a press conference, U.S. president Joe Biden stated, "I anticipate, I’m hoping, that the Israelis will not make any massive land invasion [of Rafah] in the meantime. So, my expectation, that’s not gonna happen." Yoav Gallant stated the Israeli military was in the process of planning the Rafah offensive. When asked about Israel's plans for potential refugees fleeing Gaza during a military offensive, Israeli Foreign Minister Israel Katz stated, "We will coordinate with Egypt". The Sinai Foundation for Human Rights stated that Egypt was building an enclosure with tents "in the case of a mass exodus", though North Sinai Governor Mohamed Shousha stated this was not true. Seven people were killed and more wounded in an Israeli bombing of the Nassr neighbourhood.

At least thirteen people were killed in two airstrikes on Rafah. A bombing from an Israeli fighter jet destroyed a residential building. Benjamin Netanyahu stated, "Whoever is telling us not to operate in Rafah is telling us to lose an ear". The U.S. began preparing to send Israel more weapons.

The North Sinai governor stated that Egyptian construction on the Rafah border was a "designated spaces for [humanitarian aid] trucks, storage units, administrative offices and places for the drivers to stay overnight". UN spokesman Stéphane Dujarric stated, "In Rafah, humanitarian conditions have become increasingly severe with continued reports of people stopping aid trucks to take food". David M. Satterfield stated that the Israeli killing of Rafah police for truck convoys had made the safe distribution of aid "virtually impossible". ActionAid warned that if Israel proceeded with an offensive on Rafah, "Aid operations will grind to a complete halt, denying a lifeline to hundreds of thousands of people".

The Egyptian Foreign Minister admitted Egypt was preparing safe areas for Gaza refugees while reiterating that displacement of Palestinians into Egypt was unacceptable: "It is not our intention to provide any safe areas or facilities, but if this is necessary we will deal with the humanity that is necessary." Netanyahu stated Israeli ground soldiers would go into Rafah, stating, "Whoever tells us not to operate in Rafah, is telling us to lose the war."

Israeli war cabinet member Benny Gantz warned that a ground offensive would be launched in Rafah on 10 March unless Hamas has freed all hostages by then. Gantz added Israel would act in "a co-ordinated manner, facilitating the evacuation of civilians in dialogue with our American and Egyptian partners to minimise civilian casualties". President of Egypt Abdel Fattah el-Sisi stated his "categorical rejection of the displacement of Palestinians to Egypt in any shape or form".

On 19 February, the US proposed an alternative draft resolution for the United Nations Security Council calling for a temporary ceasefire and opposing a major Israeli ground offensive in Rafah, Reuters reported. The text "determines that under current circumstances a major ground offensive into Rafah would result in further harm to civilians and their further displacement including potentially into neighboring countries." The resolution says such a move "would have serious implications for regional peace and security, and therefore underscores that such a major ground offensive should not proceed under current circumstances." Israel sets a deadline for the offensive, saying it will begin if the hostages aren't freed by Ramadan.

On 21 February, Israel bombed a residential building and wounded one person, leading journalist Tareq Abu Azzoum to state, "Right now Rafah has been a centre for Israeli attacks". An Israeli airstrike on the home of an attorney for the Palestinian Centre for Human Rights killed the woman, as well as seven family members, including her two-year-old child. On 22 February, bombing in Rafah destroyed a mosque and killed approximately 100 people. Israeli officials stated that they were determined to carry out an attack on Rafah, despite not having a precise strategy or knowing where people would be relocated to. On 23 February, an Israeli bombing killed a Palestinian Red Crescent paramedic. Eight additional people were reported killed in Israeli airstrikes. The International Monetary Fund stated it was in talks with Egyptian officials for a "very comprehensive support package" ahead of the "expected entry of refugees into Egypt from Gaza."

On 24 February, Netanyahu announced he was convening the war cabinet the following week to approve its Rafah operation. Seven people were killed in an airstrike, with five identified and two "incinerated beyond recognition". In a 25 February interview with CBS News, Netanyahu stated of the Rafah offensive: "If we have a deal, it will be delayed somewhat, but it will happen. If we don't have a deal, we'll do it anyway". UNRWA stated, "Increased airstrikes in Rafah... have heightened fears that they will further hamper overstretched humanitarian operations". Eight people were reported killed in airstrikes on residential buildings in central Rafah. On 26 February, Stéphane Dujarric, the UN Secretary-General's spokesman, stated a Rafah offensive would be disastrous for humanitarian aid relief, civilians, and "the region as a whole." Israeli airstrikes on Deir al-Balah increased, reportedly in advance of a ground operation on Rafah. Four people, including a child, were killed in an airstrike on a home in north Rafah.

Former Israeli prime minister Ehud Olmert stated there would be dire consequences if Israel were to invade Rafah and called on Netanyahu to stop the war, stating, "The patience of the international community has reached a point from where I don't think they'll be able to absorb it". Heavy artillery firing was reported in eastern Rafah, with Al Jazeera reporting that "it's becoming increasingly visible right now that Rafah is not safe."

=== March 2024 ===
An airstrike on Yibna refugee camp in Rafah reportedly killed one child and wounded others. Two people were killed in a bombing on the ash-Shoka neighborhood in Rafah. An airstrike on tents in Rafah killed eleven people, leading the World Health Organization secretary-general Tedros Adhanom Ghebreyesus to state the bombing was "outrageous and unspeakable". The strike occurred next to the Emirati Maternity Hospital and killed the hospital's head of the paramedic unit.

Fourteen people, including six children, were killed by an Israeli airstrike on the Al-Salam neighborhood in eastern Rafah. At least 17 people were killed in airstrikes that destroyed two homes. A child was killed by Israeli shelling in east Rafah. At least nine people were killed in an Israeli airstrike on two homes. Israel bombed and destroyed a residential building, giving residents 30 minutes to evacuate. Wounded people taken to the Najjar Hospital in Rafah faced a lack of medical treatment, due to the shortage of staff and medical supplies.

Netanyahu stated Israel was planning ahead for its Rafah offensive, stating, "There is international pressure and it's growing, but particularly when the international pressure rises, we must close ranks, we need to stand together against the attempts to stop the war". Former US ambassador to Israel, Martin Indyk stated, "If Israel launches an offensive in Rafah without adequately protecting the displaced civilian population, it may precipitate an unprecedented crisis in US-Israel relations, even involving arms supplies." In an interview, the U.S. president stated, "There’s red lines that if [Netanyahu] crosses them... [we] cannot have 30,000 more Palestinians dead". In an interview, Netanyahu stated that Israel would press ahead with its Rafah operation, stating "We'll go there. We're not going to leave them."

The U.S. State Department spokesman stated, "It is our judgement [Israel] cannot or should not go into Rafah without a humanitarian assistance plan that is credible and that they can actually implement". UN secretary-general Antonio Guterres stated the "threatened Israeli assault on Rafah could plummet the people of Gaza into an even deeper circle of hell".

Three people were killed in a bombing in western Rafah. The U.S. walked back statements by the president that Israel invading Rafah would be a red line, with the U.S. National Security Adviser suggesting it would be a "concern" if Israel were to invade.

In a report by Politico, U.S. officials stated, "Top administration officials have signaled to Israel that they could support a plan more akin to counterterrorism operations than all-out war" in Rafah. IDF spokesman Daniel Hagari stated that Israel planned to push displaced people into what it called "humanitarian islands" in central Gaza. Yoav Gallant suggested a Rafah offensive was imminent, stating, "Those who think we are delaying [the invasion of Rafah] will soon see there is no place we cannot reach." In a meeting with Dutch prime minister Mark Rutte, Netanyahu stated that a Rafah invasion was "necessary" for Israel's war aims.

Two people were killed by an Israeli drone strike on a civilian car.

In an op-ed, Ophir Falk, Netanyahu's senior political adviser, wrote, "High-intensity combat will wind down after Rafah... Total victory is within reach. Israel will finish the job." An Israeli attack on a United Nations aid distribution center killed one UN worker and wounded 22 others. Israel rejected a Hamas ceasefire proposal and stated it "is prepared for the operation".

World Health Organization secretary-general Tedros Adhanom Ghebreyesus stated he was "gravely concerned" about a Rafah invasion, stating, "Further escalation of violence in this densely populated area would lead to many more deaths and suffering, especially with health facilities already overwhelmed". The Biden Administration stated an Israeli failure to provide a plan to protect civilians in Rafah by 24 March could push the alliance into "new territory".

President of the European Commission Ursula von der Leyen stated a Rafah offensive needed "to be avoided at all costs". The spokesman for Egyptian president Abdel Fattah el-Sisi stated Egypt wouldn't allow Palestinians to be forcibly displaced into Egypt. German prime minister Olaf Scholz stated, "We must do everything so the situation does not get worse than it already is".

Jamie McGoldrick, a UN official, stated, "If there was to be an incursion, that [aid] system we have, which is already precarious and intermittent, would then be broken". Christopher Lockyear, the secretary-general of Doctors Without Borders, stated the Rafah offensive "must not be allowed to happen".

The Palestinian Foreign Ministry condemned Israel for its "escalating bombardment and systematic destruction" of Rafah, stating it was ignoring international warnings. In a call with Benny Gantz, Canadian Prime Minister Justin Trudeau stated that a Rafah offensive would have "severe humanitarian implications" for civilians. During their first known call in more than a month, Biden told Netanyahu he had "deep concerns about the prospect of Israel conducting a major ground operation in Rafah". At least 14 people were killed by an Israeli airstrike.

Netanyahu stated it would soon approve an evacuation plan for Rafah, stating that the operation "will take some time". A displaced person told journalists, "There are no safe areas. [Israel's] hitting from every direction and they don’t care about people. They displaced us from here to there and we don’t know where to go".

The U.S. Secretary of State said, "A ground operation into Rafah would be a mistake and we cannot support it." The Strategic Affairs Minister of Israel, Ron Dermer, stated Israel would invade Rafah even if it caused a rift between the U.S. and Israel. In a call, the U.S. Secretary of Defense urged the Israeli Defense Minister "to consider alternatives to a major ground operation in Rafah".

The U.S Secretary of State, Antony Blinken, stated that the Rafah offensive would be unnecessary and a "mistake" by Israel since, according to Blinken, it wouldn't be necessary for defeating Hamas and said that the best solution currently would be an immediate, sustained cease-fire and the release of Israeli hostages currently in Gaza. Before this, Australia and the UK made a joint statement saying that the offensive would have “devastating consequences", especially with the number of displaced Palestinians. Netanyahu stated Israel would invade Rafah even without U.S. support.

Israeli drones circled Rafah to collect intelligence about potential targets. 8 people were killed by an Israeli airstrike in east Rafah. Five children were reported killed and seven wounded by an Israeli airstrike in eastern Rafah, while the Israeli navy shelled the western part of the city.

U.S. vice president Kamala Harris stated, "I am ruling out nothing," when asked if there could be consequences for Israel if they invaded Rafah. Hani Mahmoud, a journalist in Rafah, reported "relentless air strikes" killed six people from a single family.

Medics in Rafah stated that thirty people had been killed by Israeli forces in the prior 24 hours. Reporting from Rafah, journalist Tareq Abu Azzoum stated Israeli airstrikes in the past day had "completely destroyed" residential neighborhoods. Journalists in Rafah stated that an Israeli airstrike on a home killed 18 people, including nine children. Israeli National Security Minister Itamar Ben-Gvir stated, "We must enter Rafah now".

The head of Doctors Without Borders in Gaza stated, "If the attack occurs in Rafah, we just don't know where to put the patients. There is no place for the patients to go". Several people were killed in overnight Israeli air raids. Hani Mahmoud, a journalist in Rafah, stated that "massive attacks" had killed twenty-four people in the prior 24 hours. Farmland was destroyed, and the al-Mawasi evacuation zone was attacked. Reporting from Rafah, Tareq Abu Azzoum stated that Israel's airstrikes had shown "that Rafah is no longer safe". Save the Children described the situation in Rafah as "overwhelmingly catastrophic".

Continued Israeli airstrikes on residential homes in Rafah killed eleven people "from a single family" in one event, and four people, including a woman and child, in another. Netanyahu stated Israel was "preparing to enter Rafah". 12 people were killed by an Israeli airstrike on a house in Rafah.

=== April 2024 ===
The Lemkin Institute for Genocide Prevention stated that Israeli airstrikes on Rafah "could be the opening salvo to Israel’s promised ground invasion of the town". A bombing reportedly killed six people from a single family. Israeli Prime Minister Benjamin Netanyahu said that a date for a ground offensive into Rafah has been set, according to a video posted on his official Telegram account. He stated that "entry into Rafah" was necessary for a "complete victory over Hamas."

According to Israeli sources, Israel planned to initiate its first steps in a ground offensive in Rafah in mid-April, but postponed its plans yet again to consider their response to the Iranian strikes on Israel. Seven people, including four children, were reported killed by an Israeli strike. An attack killed at least eleven people, including five children.

According to Gaza health officials, overnight strikes on Rafah killed 22 people, including 18 children. Netanyahu threatened to increase military pressure in Gaza. One woman who died in the strike was pregnant, but doctors were able to save the baby through C-section. The baby, however, later died in hospital.

An overnight bombing reportedly killed eight people in Rafah, including children. In a separate bombing, at least seven people were reported killed in northeast Rafah after warplanes bombed a house. At least 20 people died in three separate bombings on houses in Rafah. The UN humanitarian aid chief, Martin Griffiths, stated, "A ground operation there is on the immediate horizon".

=== May 2024 ===
In early May, an overnight air strike on a house in northern Rafah killed seven people with four of the victims being children. On 5 May, health officials stated that nine people, including a baby, were killed by an Israeli airstrike.

Israel and Hamas neared a ceasefire deal, but they disagreed on the issue of ending the war, leading to a partial breakdown of negotiations and an attack on the Kerem Shalom crossing that killed three IDF soldiers on 6 May. Israel ordered the evacuation of eastern Rafah the next day and conducted airstrikes. Hamas later accepted a more moderate deal, and while Israel said it reviewed the deal, it also said it would continue the operation. Israel entered the outskirts of Rafah that night, officially starting its offensive.

== See also ==
- January 2025 Gaza war ceasefire
