= William Tanner Young =

William Tanner Young was the first British Consul in Jerusalem. He was appointed in 1838 and arrived in 1839. He held the title "vice-consul" until 1841, and "consul" from then until 1845.

Young was the son of an underwriter and a protégé of the Earl of Shaftesbury. Prior to his appointment Young had traveled in Syria and Palestine in 1835-36.

According to Andrew Bonar and Robert Murray M'Cheyne, Young was "actuated by a deep and enlightened attachment to the cause of God's ancient people", i.e. the Jews. John James Moscrop suggests that Young attempted to serve two masters: the London Jews Society and the Foreign Office. In mid-1839, he began to ask the Foreign Secretary, Lord Palmerston, for British protection for Jewish people.

In 1848, after his return to England, Young published a translation from French of The Truth in regard to England in 1817.
