= 2024 Rafah hostage raid =

Israeli hostage rescue operation in Rafah, Gaza Strip

The 2024 Rafah hostage raid, dubbed Operation Golden Hand (Hebrew: מבצע יד זהב) by the Israel Defense Forces, was a military raid and hostage rescue operation conducted in cooperation with the Shin Bet and Yamam (Israel's National Counter-Terror Unit, part of the Israeli Police) to recover two Israeli civilians kidnapped during the Nir Yitzhak attack on 7 October 2023. The operation commenced on February 12, 2024, at 1:49 AM during combat in the Gaza Strip during the Gaza war, and ended successfully with the rescue of the hostages, along with a soldier who was lightly injured during the operation. At least 74 Palestinians were killed by Israel in the early morning airstrikes used as cover for the operation, though other estimates produced numbers closer to 100.

== Background ==
On the morning of 7 October 2023, militant groups launched a surprise attack on Israel. Thousands of rockets were launched from the Gaza strip and approximately 3,500 militants infiltrated Israel, where they attacked dozens of Israeli towns and military facilities in the Gaza envelope. 1,139 Israelis and foreign nationals were killed and 248 others were abducted and held hostage. Dual Israeli-Argentinian citizens, Fernando Marman, aged 60, and Luis Har, aged 70, were kidnapped to the Gaza Strip from Kibbutz Nir Yitzhak as part of the attack on Nir Yitzhak on October 7, 2023. Israel invaded the Gaza Strip on October 27th.

This was the second successful hostage rescue attempt since the start of the war, with the first rescue occurring on 30 October 2023 resulting in the rescue of Ori Megidish, a captured IDF soldier.

== The airstrikes ==
12 February 2024 Rafah strikes
- Part of the background of the Rafah offensive and the Gaza war
- Location: 31°16′21″N 34°15′31″E; Rafah, southern Gaza Strip
- Date: 12 February 2024
- Attack type: Airstrikes, massacre
- Deaths: 94–100+ Palestinians killed by Israeli airstrikes
- Injuries: Unknown
- Perpetrator: Israeli Air Force

According to the Associated Press, Israeli airstrikes on Rafah began at 1:50am local time on 12 February, one minute after the start of a hostage rescue operation in a house in the Shaboura area of Rafah. The Israeli military claimed that it had conducted a series of airstrikes on targets in the Shaboura area of Rafah, while the Rafah municipality claimed at least two mosques and about a dozen homes were targeted. Reporting and analysis of satellite imagery concluded that the airstrikes extended far beyond Shaboura.

The Israeli government stated that the night's airstrikes, that resulted in the deaths of at least 67 civilians, were conducted as a diversion in order to rescue two hostages. Israeli intentions with the strikes, as described by military spokesman Major Nir Dinar were: "to hit Hamas military command centers, confuse the militants, sever contact between the hostages’ captors and their commanders, and provide cover for the escape."

The Gaza Health Ministry initially stated at least 67 Palestinian civilians, including women and children, were killed during the Israeli operation, with the number increasing to at least 94 shortly after. Israel said many of those killed were militants. The Gaza Health Ministry said that 70% of those killed were civilians. Describing the scene, Al Jazeera correspondent Tareq Abu Azzoum stated, "People were terrified; they didn't know where to go. Families were running in the middle of the streets, looking for a place safe from the Israeli bombardment. This attack was beyond comprehension."

A civilian who had been sheltering in Rafah stated that the night was indescribable, and he and others around him thought that the IDF was invading Rafah due to the amount of airstrikes. Among the locations struck were the Al-Huda mosque, and the family homes of the Abu-Jazar, Hassouna, and Al-Shaer families. Libération newspaper geolocated these sites as between 1.5 and 2.2 kilometers away from the hostage rescue. Eighteen members of the Abu-Jazar family were killed in their home in the Badr refugee camp, including an infant and three young Qwaider children who were cousins of the Abu-Jazars. The Hassouna family, who rented a house after fleeing violence elsewhere in Gaza, was attacked by an airstrike to their one-story house, which was destroyed, killing eight family members, including two children. Among them was Sidra Hassouna, who was thrown out of the building and left hanging from a wall. Photos of Sidra Hassouna's lifeless body widely circulated on social media. The Hasounas were relatives of Palestine's Ambassador the UK, Husam Zomlot. Eight members of the Al-Shaer family, spanning three generations, were killed in their home, which was collapsed by an airstrike. Other sites were struck and the AP reported that the airstrikes "flatten[ed] several residential blocks in a built-up refugee camp." Following the hostage rescue operation, the site where the hostages were held was leveled.

The Al-Huda mosque was largely destroyed, but parishioners held worship services in the remains of the building on February 23.

These actions have been interpreted as possible war crimes.

== The operation ==
2024 Rafah hostage raid
- Part of the Gaza war
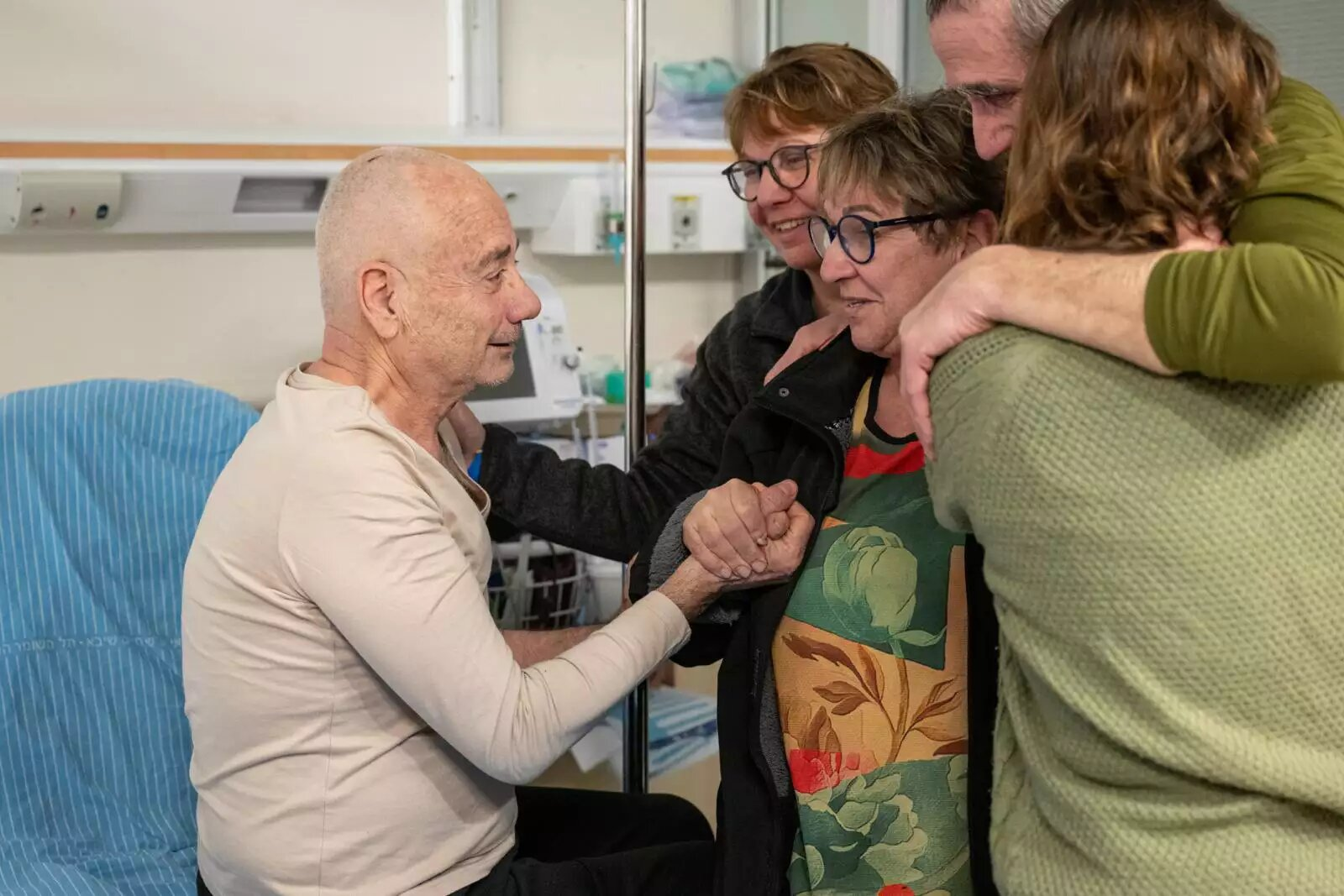
- One of the rescued hostages receiving medical care in an Israeli hospital and reuniting with his family
Date	12 February 2024; 2 years ago
Location	Gaza Strip
Result	Fernando Marman (60) and Luis Har (70), two Argentine-Israeli held hostages, were rescued

Belligerents
Israel	Hamas

Documentation of the operation from a helmet camera of a YAMAM operative, Israeli Police

YAMAM (Israel's National Counter-Terror Unit), Shin Bet (Israeli Security Agency), and Shayetet 13 (IDF Naval Commando) worked on the operation for an extended period, but until February 12, the conditions in the field did not allow for the execution of the operation. The operational headquarters that managed the operation included the head of Shin Bet, the Chief of Staff, the Police Commissioner, the commander of Yamam, the head of Military Intelligence, the head of the Operations Directorate, and the commander of the Air Force. Later, the Defense Minister and the Prime Minister joined.

IDF spokesperson Daniel Hagari stated that the operation occurred at around 1:49am with early morning coordinated airstrikes from the Israeli Air Force occurring about a minute after the operation began, when the militants were sleeping. Yamam forces reportedly gained access to the hostage building in central Rafah by abseiling from the roof of a nearby building.

When the coordinated airstrikes began the soldiers reportedly covered the hostages with their bodies to protect from debris. The soldiers exited the building from the second floor with the rescued hostages by abseiling due to a concern of more militants hiding on the first floor. One Israeli soldier was lightly injured after having fallen from a high place. The duration of the operation was about an hour.

Evacuation of the soldiers and hostages by a helicopter that transferred the hostages to Israel, by Shayetet 13 commandos, unit 5515 and the 7th Armored Brigade. The two hostages were taken for medical examinations at the Sheba Medical Center, where it was reported that their overall condition was stable, but that they were weak and suffered from considerable weight loss.

== Aftermath ==
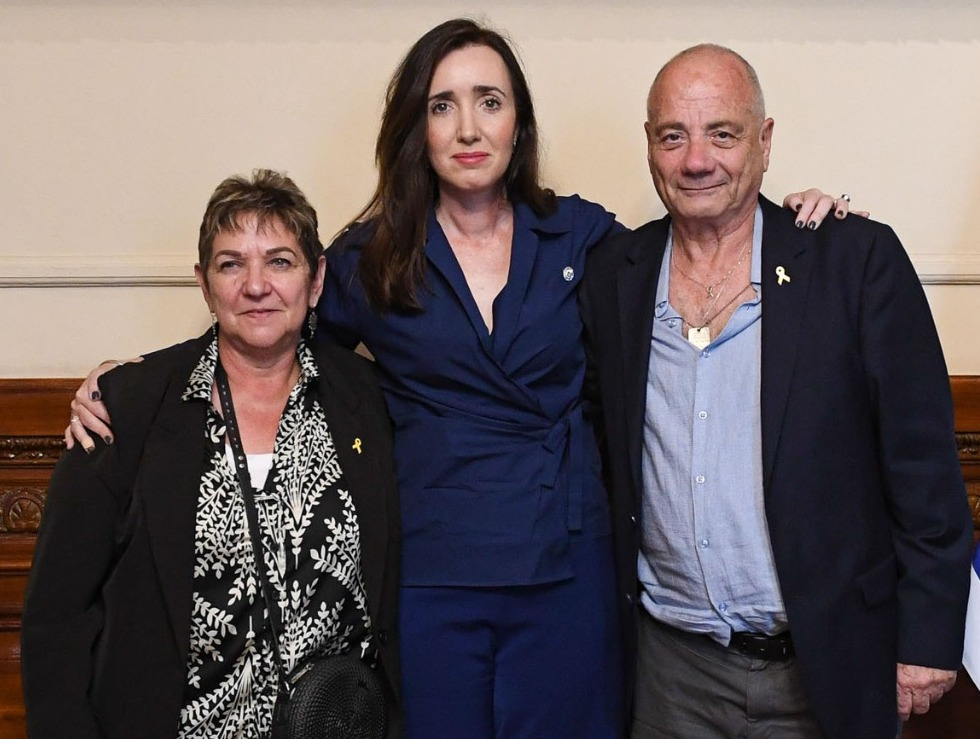
Argentine vice president Victoria Villarruel (centre) posing with rescued hostage Luis Har (right) along with Har's girlfriend, Clara Marman (left), September 2024. Marman was also kidnapped and taken hostage, but was released 11 weeks earlier, as part of the 2023 Gaza war ceasefire. Fernando Marman, who was rescued along with Har, is Clara's brother. Har and the two Marmans are dual Israeli-Aregentinian citizens.

At least 74 Palestinians were confirmed to have been killed by the airstrikes alongside the raid. According to the Palestinian Centre for Human Rights, which pulled information from Rafah hospitals the dead included at least 27 children and 22 women.

The operation was widely reviewed in the Israeli media that praised the security forces for the successful operation. It also gained considerable coverage by media around the world. Prime Minister Benjamin Netanyahu, Defense Minister Yoav Gallant and Police Commissioner Yaakov Shabtai met with the soldiers who participated in the mission and congratulated them for their success.

A Hamas spokesperson called the airstrikes a series of "horrific massacres against defenseless civilians and displaced children, women and the elderly".

The prosecutor of the International Criminal Court, Karim Khan has stated that the reports coming from Rafah were cause for deep concern and seemed to be ignoring laws of armed conflict. Some such as sports commentator Dave Zirin called it the "Super Bowl Massacre" due to their concurrence with Super Bowl LVIII.

Some commentators pointed out that millions of Americans were celebrating the Super Bowl simultaneously as dozens of Palestinians were being killed. Jewish Voice for Peace stated: "The Israeli military is bombing Rafah, the most densely populated area in the world, while Americans watch the Super Bowl. This is intentional." The Super Bowl also aired several ads that pushed the narrative that Israel was at war with Hamas, without mentioning the 29,000 Palestinians who had been killed by the Israeli invasion of the Gaza Strip. The ads were sponsored by the Israeli government and cost an estimated $7 million. The Federal Communications Commission received 10,000 complaints about the ad, as it did not disclose that it was paid for by a foreign government.

American-Arab Anti-Discrimination Committee stated that the attacks on Rafah were planned to coincide with the Super Bowl as Israel knew the American public would not be paying attention on other news on that day. Dave Zirin also said that Israel influencing the American public through ads, as it killed dozens of Palestinians, was "more like military synergy than happenstance."

Harvard University students participated in a "die-in" at Widener Library to protest against the airstrikes, which was publicized online by the Palestinian Red Crescent Society, and other groups.

== See also ==
- Rescue of Ori Megidish
- 2024 Nuseirat rescue operation
