= Embassy of Palestine, London =

Embassy of the State of Palestine to the United Kingdom
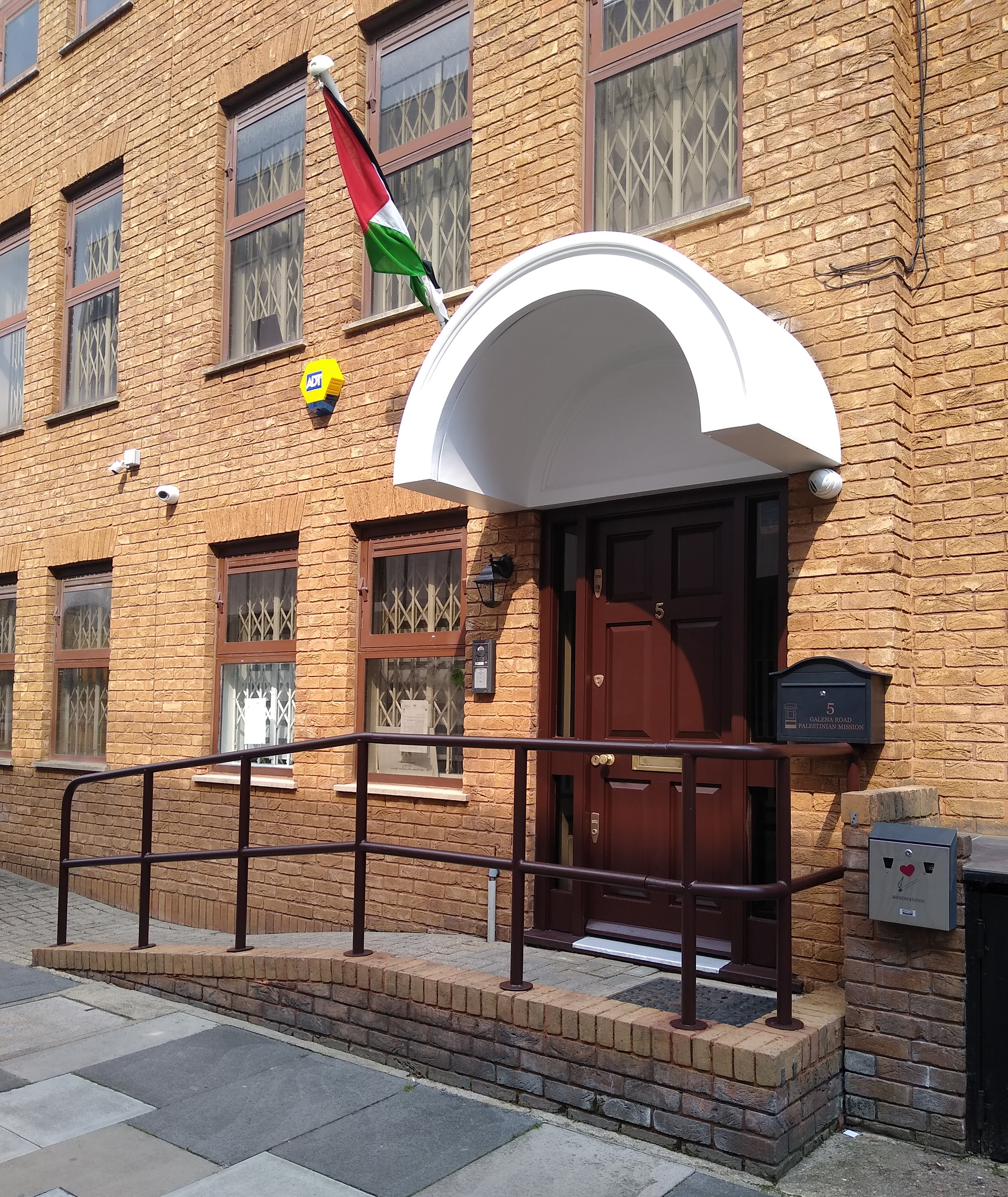
- Location: Hammersmith, London
- Address: 5 Galena Road, London, W6 0LT
- Coordinates: 51.493525°N 0.232793°W
- Ambassador: Dr. Husam Zomlot
- Website: https://uk.mfae.gov.ps

The Embassy of the State of Palestine to the United Kingdom in London is the diplomatic mission of the State of Palestine in the United Kingdom. The embassy is located in Hammersmith, West London.

In September 2025, the United Kingdom formally recognised the State of Palestine, and the former mission was upgraded to full embassy status in January 2026.

== History ==
Palestinian representation in the UK began in the 1970s with a Palestine Liberation Organization (PLO) information office in London. In 1988 the UK government agreed to upgrade this office to the PLO General Delegation, and after the 1993 Oslo Accords it was renamed the Palestinian General Delegation (representing both the PLO and the Palestinian Authority).

From the early 1970s until 1986, the Palestinian representation operated as part of the former Arab League office at 52 Green Street, London. In 1986, the representation moved to independent premises at 4 Clareville Grove in South Kensington. In 1996, amid budgetary constraints, the office relocated to smaller premises at 5 Galena Road in Hammersmith, where it has remained since.

In March 2011, Foreign Secretary William Hague announced the UK would upgrade the delegation to mission status.

=== Recognition and upgrade to embassy ===
On 21 September 2025, the British government formally recognised the State of Palestine as an independent country, based on provisional 1967 borders, which paved the way for full diplomatic relations. Prime Minister Keir Starmer announced the decision as a way to "keep alive the possibility of peace and a two-state solution". A flag-raising ceremony took place on 22 September 2025 at the mission to mark this recognition.

The mission was upgraded to an embassy on 5 January 2026, with a ceremony attended by British MPs, diplomats and public figures including John Swinney, First Minister of Scotland and Hamish Falconer, the minister of state for the Middle East and North Africa. The British diplomatic representative Alistair Harrison said the occasion represented the "beginning of a step change in our bilateral relationship".

=== Security incidents ===
In 2023, staff reported four attacks over several weeks, including vandalism and death threats, and described the lack of diplomatic protection as "inexplicable and unacceptable".

In November 2025, a group of masked pro-Israel activists approached the embassy entrance and vandalised the building with stickers and images. Ambassador Husam Zomlot condemned the incident as "a flagrant breach of diplomatic laws and customs" and formally called on UK authorities to provide "immediate and comprehensive protection" for the mission and its staff, in line with the UK’s obligations under the Vienna Convention.

== List of Heads of Mission ==
- Said Hammami (1970-1978)
- Nabil Ramlawi (1978-1983)
- Faisal Oweida (1983-1990)
- Afif Safieh (1990-2005)
- Manuel Hassassian (2005-2018)
- Husam Zomlot (2018-)

== Gallery ==
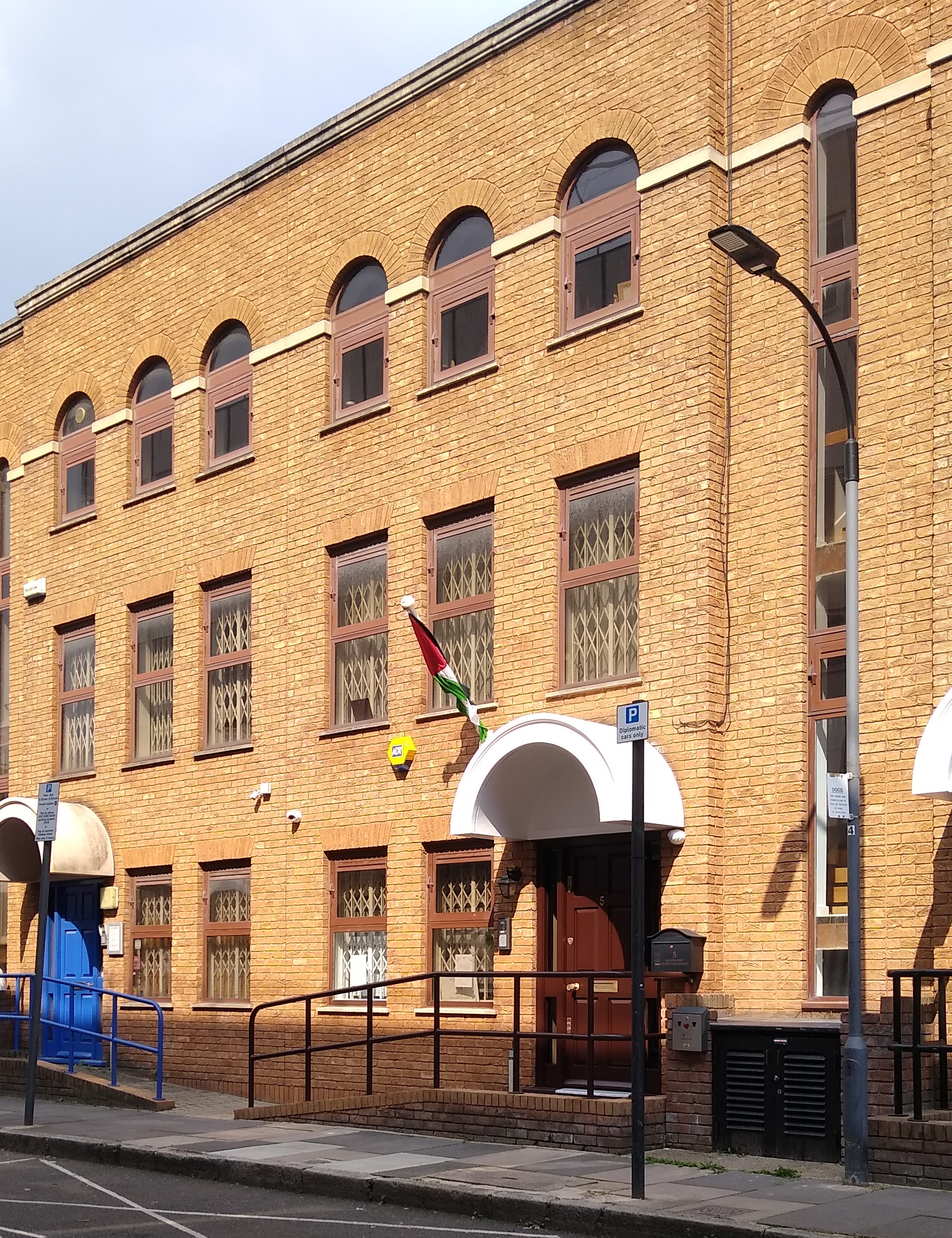
The mission as of 2021

== See also ==
- Palestine–United Kingdom relations
