= Douglas McLeod =

Douglas or Doug McLeod may refer to:

- Doug McLeod (Mississippi politician) (born 1960), an American politician from Mississippi
- E. Douglas McLeod (born 1941), an American politician from Texas
