= Anchía =

Anchía is a surname. Notable people with the surname include:

- Juan Ruiz Anchía (born 1949), Spanish cinematographer
- Rafael Anchía (born 1968), American politician from Texas
