= List of Cake Boss episodes =

Cake Boss is an American reality television series, which originally aired on the cable television network TLC from April 19, 2009, to December 2, 2017. New episodes returned on May 18, 2019, with the show moving to TLC's sister network, Discovery Family until December 12, 2020.

During the course of the series, 257 episodes of Cake Boss aired over ten seasons.

== Series overview ==
Season	Episodes	Originally released		
Season	Episodes	First released	Last released	Network
1	13	April 19, 2009	August 17, 2009	TLC
2	19	October 26, 2009	February 22, 2010	TLC
3	25	May 31, 2010	November 29, 2010	TLC
4	41	January 31, 2011	January 30, 2012	TLC
5	30	May 28, 2012	February 18, 2013	TLC
6	28	May 27, 2013	February 24, 2014	TLC
7	21	September 8, 2015	November 24, 2015	TLC
8	32	August 23, 2016	December 2, 2017	TLC
9	38	May 18, 2019	April 11, 2020	Discovery Family
10	10	October 10, 2020	December 12, 2020	Discovery Family

== Episodes ==
=== Season 1 (2009) ===
No. overall	No. in season	Title	Original release date
1	1	"A Bride, a Boat and Bamboozled!"	April 19, 2009
After beginning a week with many cake orders, Buddy is called for a photo spread in Brides Magazines. But last-minute changes mean Buddy has to crack the whip to make the deadline.
2	2	"A Fire, a Fashionista and Family"	May 25, 2009
Buddy and his team learn that where there is smoke, there is fire when they have to build a fire engine cake complete with working lights, siren and smoke. Also, Buddy recreates his father's trademark cake for the family memorial dinner.
3	3	"Bunny, Birthday and Burnt Food"	June 1, 2009
It's one of the busiest weeks of the year at Carlo's Bakery with orders pouring in for Easter and a last minute Easter Bunny cake turns into more than the team bargained for. And the family is nervous when Grace decides to cook Easter dinner for everyone.
4	4	"Weddings, Water and Wacked!"	June 8, 2009
The team at Carlo's is hoping not to get wacked when they're asked to make a huge roulette table cake for a local businessman. It's also the start of wedding season and the time consuming weeding cake orders are piling up, throwing Buddy off the handle.
5	5	"Bi-Plane, Bridezilla and Busting Buddy"	June 15, 2009
Buddy agrees to make a charity bi-plane cake for a local hospital and an unreasonable Bridezilla makes everyone's life difficult after the bakery crew makes a cake that she's not pleased with. Stretch plots revenge against Buddy with unexpected results.
6	6	"Undead, Unclothed and Unhappy Mama"	June 22, 2009
Buddy is thrown out of his comfort zone when he's asked to make a zombie cake for a couple of undead clients. This week the team also has to make an erotic bachelorette cake for some wild women. It's all fun and games until Mama finds out.
7	7	"Doves, Ducks and Delicacies"	June 29, 2009
Buddy is excited to create an old school weeding cake like the kind his father used to make; tall, ornate and filled with live birds. A father-to-be comes to the bakery to order a giant lobster tail pastry for his pregnant wife.
8	8	"Museum, Mistakes and Mother Mary"	July 6, 2009
The Carlo's team takes a field trip to a local museum for a prehistoric mammal cake. A Sweet 16 cake proves to be more work than anyone planned on and Frankie makes and decorates a cake all by himself for a hard-to-please client... Mary.
9	9	"Soldiers, Sand and Salads"	July 13, 2009
Buddy and Co are like kids in a toy store - literally, when they are asked to make a Fao Schwarz-themed cake for a twin's birthday party. They also have a beach-themed cake to create for a local beach club and the Carlo's team have a weight loss challenge.
10	10	"Chinese Culture and Cannolis"	July 20, 2009
The Carlo's Team has a unique and challenging cake to make this week, a traditional Chinese dragon cake for a dragon boat racing team. It's also a big week at the bakery preparing hundreds of cannoli shells for the annual $.25 Throw Back Cannoli Day.
11	11	"A Blindfold, a Bikini and Breathing Fire"	July 27, 2009
Buddy is used to putting out fires, not starting them but all that changes when he's asked to make a tiki cake that spits fire. If that weren't enough, Mauro challenges him to ice a cake blindfolded.
12	12	"Leaning, Lobsters and Lectures"	August 10, 2009
Buddy has to channel his inner Italian to create a Leaning Tower Of Pisa weeding cake. Then, he gets into hot water when he must pull together a show stopping lobster bake-themed cake at the last second after a client mixes up the date.
13	13	"Fireworks, Falling Fondant and Fathers"	August 17, 2009
A fellow family owned business asks Buddy and the Carlo's team to honor their patriarch by creating a special cake featuring their company's product...fireworks. Then Buddy attends 'Bring Your Dad to School Day' at Buddy Jr.'s elementary school.

=== Season 2 (2009–10) ===
No. overall	No. in season	Title	Original release date
14	1	"Plants, Pranks and a Proposal"	October 26, 2009
Buddy has to create a cake inspired by Wicked and poisonous plants. A customer wants to propose to his girlfriend at the bakery and asks Buddy to make an engagement ring box cake, and Cousin Anthony is set up... for a fall.
15	2	"Candy, Crash and Crisis"	October 26, 2009
the team at Carlo's Bakery creates an uber-sweet Candy Land cake for Dylan's Candy Bar. However they encounter several obstacles, including a broken sugar sculpture and a malfunctioning airbrush machine. Despite challenges, they refuse to give up and work tirelessly to overcome each obstacle. Meanwhile, there's a bit of drama unfolding at the bakery. Buddy's juvenile cousin has a greedy sweet tooth that puts the Candy Land cake at risk. Additionally, a bumpy car ride adds tension to the situation. In the midst of all this, Buddy's sisters pressure him to hire an assistant. This is ostensibly for his own sake, but it adds another layer of complexity to the situation. Finally, Cousin Anthony has a traffic accident while on delivery. This incident adds to the crisis theme of the episode. Despite all the hurdles, the end result is two stunning cakes that exceed their clients’ expectations. This episode showcases the resilience and dedication of Buddy and his team, as well as the chaotic and unpredictable nature of working in a busy bakery.
16	3	"Painters, Pool and Pink!"	November 2, 2009
Buddy creates a billiards table cake for football player Justin Tuck and gets an opportunity to show off his pool skills. The bakery gets a makeover with unexpected results and Buddy makes a cake for the painters.
17	4	"Robots, Rollerskates and Relatives"	November 2, 2009
Buddy channels his inner hacker when he's asked to create a moving robot cake. He also has to make a 1970s-themed rollerskate cake and deliver it on skates. Cousin Anthony gets a talkative companion on a delivery.
18	5	"A Battleship, Ballet and Burning!"	November 9, 2009
The U.S. Air Forces invites Buddy and his bakers to their base to commission a cake. Later, at the bakery, as everyone begins to work on a dance for Dance Now, Air Force veteran Joey's over-baked cakes set off a smoke detector. The combination of battleships, ballet, and baking certainly makes for an intriguing episode.
19	6	"Children, a Cage and a Challenge"	November 16, 2009
Buddy has a loudmouth in the bakery this week but it's not a customer, it's a talking cake. Then, when Buddy is tasked with a cage fighting cake, his teenage nephew is inspired to challenge Fankie to a wrestling match.
20	7	"Pizza, Poochies and Pop-in-Law"	November 23, 2009
Buddy makes a new four-legged friend named James when he's asked to create a cake for a local animal shelter. And he might be in the doghouse when he challenges his father-in-law to a pizza making contest after making him a themed pizza cake.
21	8	"Golf Greens and Gravity"	November 23, 2009
Buddy Valastro and his team face two main challenges. The first is to create a life-sized golf green cake for a local country club. To find inspiration for this cake, Buddy takes his crew golfing. This outdoor adventure is not only a bonding experience but also helps them gather ideas for the design of the golf-themed cake. The second challenge is to construct a solar system cake for a local planetarium. This task proves to be quite a structural headache for the bakers as they strive to accurately represent the planets and maintain the structural integrity of the cake. Adding to the excitement, Buddy boasts that he can make a cake using any tools at all, which leads to him being challenged to make a cake of Carlo's Bakery quality using an Easy Bake toy oven. This humorous subplot showcases Buddy's skill and the playful dynamics with the bakery.
22	9	"Freaks, Fast Food and Frightened Frankie"	November 30, 2009
The bakery heavyweights are challenged to an eating contest after they create a buffet-style cake for Major League Eating. Then one of Frankie's biggest fears is exposed while making a cake for the Coney Island SideShow.
23	10	"Colorful Characters and Christmas Costumes"	December 7, 2009
It's a drag at the bakery this week when Buddy and Co. have to make a holiday-themed cake for drag queen Miss Richfield 1981. Cousin Anthony and stretch beg Buddy to let them deliver a cake to a party full of women but Buddy has a trick on his sleeve.
24	11	"Motorcycles, Manhattanites and Misbehaving"	December 14, 2009
Buddy channels his inner bad boy and Upsets Mama with his motorcycle fever when he's asked to make a cake for Long Island Hells Angels. On the opposite spectrum, he also has to make a Tea Party-themed cake for a group of Upper East Sides socialites.
25	12	"Blushing Brides and Busy Bakers"	January 4, 2010
Carlo's Bakery has a record week when they have to make fifty wedding cakes in seven days. Buddy's number one priority is wowing his cousin and sister-in law with the grandest wedding cake ever but will Cousin Anthony be able to make the delivery by himself?
26	13	"Apples, Arguments and Animal Prints"	January 11, 2010
Buddy is inspired to create a new cake recipe when he is asked to make an apple tree cake for a local orchard. Mary threatens to buy her fortieth birthday cake from a rival baker when Buddy doesn't give her the attention she requires.
27	14	"Sizing, Sleeping Stretch and Sesame Street"	January 18, 2010
The team at the bakery is excited to create a cake for the 40th anniversary of Sesame Street. However the task is not easy and they face the challenges along the way. Despite the difficulties, Buddy Valastro, the host of the show, managed to create a special surprise for his favorite character. The cake they made for sesame street is eight feet long.
28	15	"Chimps, Cinema and Crumb Cake"	January 25, 2010
The crew channels their inner animal when they are asked to make a cake for the 110th anniversary of the Bronx Zoo. They also make a cake for the grand opening of Clearview Cinemas which happens to be the only movie theater in Hoboken once the client makes up their mind about the design.
29	16	"Cars, Collapse and Couture"	January 31, 2010
Buddy and his team get the order of a lifetime when they are asked to make a life-size replica of a NASCAR out of cake for the Retail Bakers Association's annual convention in Charlotte, North Carolina.
30	17	"Aquarium Adventures and an Announcement"	February 1, 2010
A local aquarium orders an underwater-themed cake for their birthday and Buddy puts his signature on it by adding live fish. Lisa and Remy make a special announcement to Buddy who can't wait to tell the rest of the family.
31	18	"Castles, Cannolis and Cartoon Characters"	February 8, 2010
Buddy and Mauro travel to Disney World to make Carlo's famous cannolis for the Epcot Food and Wine Festival. The guys also decide to bring down their families for a vacation and make an out-of-this-world cake for Buddy's daughter Sofia's Birthday.
32	19	"Best of Cake Boss"	February 22, 2010
In this special episode, Buddy counts down his top five favorites cakes and re-lives some of the most memorable moments from past two seasons. Note: This is a one-hour episode.

=== Season 3 (2010) ===
No. overall	No. in season	Title	Original release date
33	1	"Governor, Giant Lisa and Good-bye Mama"	May 31, 2010
Buddy makes a life-size replica of his wife for her 30th birthday, and New Jersey Governor Chris Christie asks for a cake, arranged by New Jersey Devils owner Jeffrey Vanderbeek. Buddy's mother retires. Buddy announces an Employee of the Month contest – which he wins. (In addition to its regular version, this episode was also broadcast as a special Icing on the Cake episode, featuring special facts about the family, shop and baked goods, done in the same style as Pop-Up Video and Pawn Stars.) Note: This is a one-hour episode.
34	2	"Ultimate Cake Boss"	May 31, 2010
Note: This is a one-hour episode.
35	3	"Peppermint and a Polar Bear Plunge"	June 7, 2010
Buddy and the crew make a peppermint cake for the Coney Island Polar Bear Club and decide to go for a swim themselves(against his mother's wishes). Also, Buddy makes an ice-cream clown cake for his son's birthday.
36	4	"Roses, Romance and a Romeo"	June 7, 2010
It's Valentine's Day and Buddy is given a huge responsibility, 14 cake flavors for a wedding cake for 14 brides being married at the top of the Empire State Building. Meanwhile, Anthony encounters an old acquaintance; in addition, makes a bold decision that shocks Buddy and the guys, while making another among their group seeing another kind of red. (Also presented as an Icing on the Cake special.)
37	5	"Tournament of Knights and a Tasty Tiramisu"	June 14, 2010
Buddy's Italian speaking skills are put to the test as he has to make an authentic tiramisu for a client who has family visiting from Italy. In addition, a knight from Medieval Times comes to the bakery to ask for a cake for his king and queen and challenges Buddy to a joust. (Also presented as an Icing on the Cake special.)
38	6	"Hieroglyphics, Hearse and Happy Parents"	June 14, 2010
A funeral hearse is made for a surprise cake. A mother and daughter cannot agree on a theme for a Sweet 16 cake, with one desiring an Egyptian theme, and the other a more girlish fashion-oriented theme. An animal-themed cake is made for an Indian baby shower.
39	7	"Chopped Head and a Crazy Cravings Cake"	June 21, 2010
Buddy has to make a cake for a Marie Antoinette party, a "cravings" cake for his sister, Lisa Gonzalez, for her baby shower. Mauro faces a short health care crisis. The rest of the clan is concerned while Mauro claims it to be "no big deal."
40	8	"Magazines, a Mega Screen and Maurizio"	June 21, 2010
In this episode, Carlo's Bakery is tasked with creating cakes for the tenth anniversaries of Nasdaq and O Magazine. Meanwhile, Anthony wants to become a full-time baker so Maurizio, Buddy's brother-in-law, is tested to take over deliveries.
41	9	"A Princess, a Pirate and a Perplexing Arch"	June 28, 2010
Buddy is feeling the pressure when Mary, his toughest critic, asks him to make a pirate-theme cake for her twins' birthday party. Also, an over-the-top cake is made for a casino opening.
42	10	"6-Foot Sub Sandwich, Zeppoles and a Sick Mauro"	July 12, 2010
It's Easter time and the shop is busy as ever. Buddy makes a sandwich cake for the 100th anniversary of Fiore's, a sandwich shop next to the original Carlo's Bakery. Joey, Sal, and Cousin Anthony make items for the bakery in honor of St. Joseph's Day, and Buddy and Maddelena stage an intervention for Mauro, convincing him to make lifestyle changes to become more healthy.
43	11	"Color, Camouflage and Cupcake Day"	July 19, 2010
Buddy and the team are asked to make a paintball cake, then partake in a paintball challenge between the men of Carlo's bakery and two paintball pros. Buddy surprises everyone by hosting their first annual cupcake day at Carlo's Bakery instead of the annual Throwback Cannoli Day.
44	12	"Key to the City and a Key-tar Cake"	July 26, 2010
Buddy and the team are asked by an 80's tribute band to make a retro cake. Also, Little Ferry, New Jersey, Buddy's birthplace, presents Buddy with the key to the city.
45	13	"Barbers and Bulls"	August 2, 2010
Buddy wants to make a cake for the barbershop where he has been getting his hair cut since he was a kid in honor of their anniversary. Also, Buddy and the team are asked to create a mechanical bull cake, complete with movement.
46	14	"Mother's Day, Mama and Mom-to-be"	August 9, 2010
Buddy makes a Mother's Day celebration cake for the Adoptive Parents Committee, which is a nonprofit support group for adoptive parents. Buddy surprises his wife on Mother's Day by having his children decorate a cake for her. The family celebrates as Lisa, Buddy's sister, gives birth to her child, a daughter named Isabella.
47	15	"Helmet Cake, Healthy Mauro and Huge Train Cake"	August 16, 2010
Buddy and the gang make a cake for "National Train Day". They face challenges with having to make the train bigger than they thought. Mauro becomes healthier as his family helps him choose better food and exercise. For the retirement of a fellow fireman and family friend, Buddy decides to make a helmet cake.
48	16	"Strawberries, Sinatra and Sick Ovens"	August 23, 2010
Buddy and the team are asked to make a cake for Häagen-Dazs' 50th anniversary, as well as a Frank Sinatra cake for the Broadway show Come Fly Away. However, filling orders becomes difficult when the ovens start to act up again. So Buddy decides that switching the oven room and decorating room will make things easier. This is Remy Gonzales' last episode.
49	17	"Familia, Fishing and Family History"	October 11, 2010
The Valastro's embark on a family tour of Italy. Their first stops are Altamura and Lipari, the birthplaces of Mama, and Buddy Sr. While there, Buddy is asked to make a wedding cake and confections for his cousin's baby shower. Note: This is a one-hour episode.
50	18	"Frescos, Fountains and Family Wishes"	October 18, 2010
The Valastro's continue their trip around Italy; Buddy and the boys get a culture lesson when asked to make a cake inspired by a fresco painting.
51	19	"Cassata, Cheesecakes and Crates of Wine"	October 18, 2010
Sicily is the last stop of the Italy vacation; after visiting a local winery, Buddy decides to make a wine bottle cake. Buddy gets a surprise from his wife Lisa – she is pregnant with their fourth child.
52	20	"Sandals, Sandwiches and Shelves"	October 25, 2010
A client travels from Myrtle Beach to order a huge Flip-Flop cake, which became even more of a challenge when one of the ovens break. A local school asks Buddy to make a peanut butter and jelly cake for their graduating third-grade class.
53	21	"Pipes, a Phoenix and a Problematic Kitchen"	November 1, 2010
In this episode, the installation of new ovens and the exchange of baking and decorating rooms at Carlo's Bakery causes some inconvenience. Mama gets upset when she finds herself left out of loop on this, and the transition impedes the store's ability to serve its customers. Meanwhile, an Irish pub wants a phoenix cake to celebrate their survival after a fire
54	22	"Snooki, Super Anthony and a Ship"	November 8, 2010
A trip to the South Street Seaport Museum in New York City for a nautical inspired cake; Nicole "Snooki" Polizzi from MTV's Jersey Shore orders a cake for her mother.
55	23	"Sweet Sixteen, Stars and a Saber Sword"	November 15, 2010
Mauro's daughter orders a sweet sixteen cake; the bakery makes a cake for the centennial of the Cadet Chapel at West Point.
56	24	"Crazy Chocolate Cake and Carlo's Centennial Celebration"	November 22, 2010
Buddy makes an elaborate chocolate cake for a couple's anniversary, which includes ingredients consisting of Hershey's products. Carlo's Bakery celebrates its 100th anniversary since its opening in 1910 with a street party, complete with a huge "timeline" cake outlining its history. Buddy shows his bakers a huge warehouse he has leased, which will play a role in the bakery's future. Note: This was Sal's last episode.
57	25	"Santa, Sunrise and Snowmen Cupcakes"	November 29, 2010
The bakery prepares for Christmas Eve, the busiest time of the year for the bakery.

=== Season 4 (2011–12) ===
No. overall	No. in season	Title	Original release date
58	1	"Circus, Celebrity Chef and Surprise!"	January 31, 2011
Buddy makes a special cake for the Ringling Bros. and Barnum & Bailey Circus; Rachael Ray pays a visit to the bakery for her show, in which Grace was an irrepressible fan; Buddy and staff make a special cake for Lisa to celebrate her fourth pregnancy, but the staff doesn't know who the cake is for. (This episode is dedicated to longtime Carlo's Bakery employee Sal Picinich, who died the day before broadcast.) Note: This is a one-hour episode.
59	2	"Shark Cake, Scooter and Smelly Fish"	February 7, 2011
Buddy makes a great white shark cake for a fisherman; he also makes a Vespa birthday cake for Madeline and Mauro, whose birthdays are close to each other.
60	3	"Hot Air Balloon Cake and Happy Little Bakers"	February 7, 2011
Buddy makes a special cake for the Make-A-Wish Foundation; he also plays host to four girls who rely on Make-A-Wish to make their common dream come true – they all want to be bakers. But, it's Buddy's brother-in-law Joey who has a special connection – his daughter was also a Make-A-Wish kid.
61	4	"Toilets and Textiles"	February 14, 2011
A plumbing supply company asks Buddy to make a toilet bowl cake with one special condition – the cake must flush. A nightclub owner who's a fan of denim requests a baby shower cake – that looks like denim. Meanwhile, someone in the bakery has accidentally made a tiered cake with uneven tiers; with the cake on a deadline, Buddy demands who's at fault.
62	5	"Ships, Sonograms and Sister Drama"	February 21, 2011
Carlo's Bakery has its own float at the Morris County Columbus Day parade – as part of their float, Buddy makes a special cake featuring Christopher Columbus. Also, Carlo's Bakery sells pies on the internet on a trial basis, leaving it to the ladies to handle the sales. Mauro, an Italian immigrant, announced that he will be taking the citizenship test to become an American citizen.
63	6	"Snow Globe, Story Book Cake and a Scare"	February 28, 2011
Buddy makes a snow globe cake for a man who wanted to use the cake as a centerpiece for a marriage proposal at Central Park. Buddy also makes a cake for her daughter's class, based on a story that she has written. But later, Buddy had to rush home as his wife Lisa is starting to have contractions.
64	7	"Cake Boss: Baby Special"	March 6, 2011
Valentine's Day is one of the busiest days of the year for Carlo's Bakery, but as Lisa's due date nears, can the bakery cope without Buddy? Buddy makes a special cake for the baby shower – a replica of the baby's nursery, but there's a dispute between him and Lisa on whether or not to include animals on the mural in the actual nursery. Buddy also decides who the baby's godparents are, but there's one problem – they're all "overqualified". The guys at the bakery also make a special cake for Buddy, as a salute to a fourth round of fatherhood after the child's birth. Among all the celebrations, Buddy takes a moment to reflect on the life of his most-valuable employee, Sal, who died two weeks earlier. Lisa goes into labor on Valentine's Day, and gives birth to a boy, whom she and Buddy name Carlo Salvatore, in honor of the bakery and Sal. Note: This is a one-hour episode.
65	8	"Pucks, Pastries and Pushy Grace"	March 7, 2011
With Buddy's fourth child Carlo born, Buddy decides to leave simple baked goods such as cookies to the staff while he concentrates on the complex cakes, so he can spend more time with his kids; however, Grace oversteps her boundaries, as she attempts to make herself the "Cake Boss" in Buddy's absence. Also, Buddy makes a table hockey game cake for a B'nai Mitzvah.
66	9	"Staten Island Chuck, Strange Oddities and Sal"	March 14, 2011
Buddy and his crew make a massive cake in celebration of Groundhog Day for Staten Island Chuck. They also make an upside-down cake – which was a multi-tiered cake literally assembled upside down – for a little girl's Ripley's Believe It or Not! birthday party. Also, Mama greets baby Carlo for the very first time (as she was on a cruise while Carlo was born), and the family pays their respects to Sal, who died on January 30, 2011.
67	10	"Punches, Psychics and Piping"	March 21, 2011
Buddy makes a cake for WWE star Santino Marella, for a promotion for the upcoming WrestleMania XXVII; he also makes a cake for a psychic. Grace also becomes a control freak when the bakers were unable to make pastries just right.
68	11	"Designer, Deadlines and Diagnosis"	March 28, 2011
Buddy makes several cakes for fashion designer Isaac Mizrahi, for a special presentation during fashion week; however, the designer is finicky on the details. The construction of the new bakery factory hits a setback when Buddy and his contractor find a cost overrun; furthermore, Grace is incensed when the model cakes being made for the new sales website are not being made correctly. On top of all this, Buddy learns that he has contracted a hernia, requiring surgery to fix.
69	12	"Tulips, Taxes and Take It Easy"	April 4, 2011
Buddy's doctor advises him to take it easy and not lift anything heavy in advance of his hernia surgery; however, Buddy does not know the meaning of "take it easy". The crew makes a cake for the Philadelphia Flower Show, but to get the flowers just right, Buddy turns to outside help to assist. The guys also make a special cake for Buddy's accountant friend, to celebrate the coming end of tax season; however, on account of his hernia, the cake may be more taxing on Buddy.
70	13	"Second Anniversary, Surgery and St. Paddy"	April 11, 2011
Buddy undergoes surgery for his hernia; in his absence, he had Mauro take over making the cakes. Mauro's first assignment – making a second-anniversary cake for a gay couple, who previously had their wedding cake made by Buddy (in the first season episode "Weddings, Water and Wacked!"). Also, Buddy was made Grand Marshal of Hoboken's St. Patrick's Day parade; however, Joey was jealous, as Buddy is not Irish.
71	14	"Space Shuttle, Stepping Up and Surprise!"	May 30, 2011
Buddy takes his mother on her first visit to the new factory to show her around, where he discusses the fact that the new factory represents his dream, just as the original bakery was his father's dream – this inspired Buddy to make a special birthday cake for her, in the same style and fashion as how his father had done in the past, which says what he and the employees say about her. Later, Buddy makes a special cake for the Kennedy Space Center in celebration of the 30th anniversary of the Space Shuttle program; however, at its request, they would like to see the cake "lift-off" – literally. Then, Buddy also requests each of its bakers to make a cake that would be included in the bakery's new online catalog – the only trouble is deciding which one would make the cut. Also, Sunshine, the bakery's best cake artist, announced that she will soon resign from the bakery to pursue a nursing career. All this work at the bakery, and the stresses of fatherhood after the birth of Carlo, have started to become a little too much for Buddy. Note: This is a one-hour episode.
72	15	"Houses, Help and Hitting the Road!"	June 6, 2011
Century 21 Real Estate hires Buddy to make a cake for its 40th-anniversary convention of its real estate agents from across the globe. However, the cake must feed 4000 people. Also, the convention is in Las Vegas. Buddy still has not been completely cleared by his doctor to do heavy lifting following his hernia operation, so he flies to Vegas and has Danny and Mauro do the heavy lifting and driving.
73	16	"Headphones, Helicopters and Handcuffed"	June 13, 2011
As the bakery gets closer to opening its new factory, Buddy and Joey had been training cousin Anthony to be an apprentice baker, and even though Anthony is family, he makes a lot of mistakes and he fears that Anthony, who's about to turn 21, won't make the cut as a new baker. For Anthony's birthday, Buddy makes a cake of a DJ's "coffin" – a box that holds all the DJ's equipment, but Buddy has a couple of extra surprises for him. Also: a medevac service hires Buddy to make a cake of its helicopter for its fifth anniversary, which they want to be delivered by helicopter; however, Buddy goes the extra mile and attempts to make the helicopter on the cake fly as well.
74	17	"A Big Bumblebee and a Bossy Grace"	June 20, 2011
Chevrolet hires Carlo's Bakery to make a cake featuring a Camaro and Bumblebee of the Transformers for their display at the New York International Auto Show. However, because of the intricate details involved in making it, the cake is being made at a special effects shop. Because of that, Buddy hires his sister, Grace, to run the bakery while he's gone, which ends up leading to problems at the bakery.
75	18	"Competition, Complications and Communion"	June 27, 2011
Parkway Lanes hires Buddy to make a cake commemorating the 40th anniversary of their bowling alley. The owners allow Buddy to get his old bowling team back together and bowl; however, Mary decides to get in on the action and creates her team in a men vs. women match – the loser gets to cut the cake. Also: Buddy's daughter, Sofia is having her first holy communion and Buddy makes a cake for her. Meanwhile, trouble arises at the new factory over the wiring, delaying construction.
76	19	"Bugs, Break-Ups and Burned Out"	July 11, 2011
An entomologist wants Buddy to make a cake for his bug club; also, he wants a cake made of bugs – for his bug club members to eat. Also: Buddy makes a cake for a woman who's celebrating the breakup with her boyfriend. Then, Joey, who is stressed out after holding two jobs at once, is faced with a decision deciding what job is more important – his firefighter job or his job as head baker.
77	20	"Moving Cake, Marbles and Mess-Ups"	July 11, 2011
A veteran go-kart driver wanted a cake made for the championships, so Buddy makes a cake in a shape of a go-kart, actual size, but Buddy wanted to go the extra mile by making it drivable. Also: Buddy makes a cake for a friend of Joey's father, a former marbles champion, who's becoming 101 years old.
78	21	"Cheeseburgers, Cures and a Challenge"	July 18, 2011
Buddy makes a cake for a hamburger enthusiast; this encourages the guys at the bakery to see who can eat the most burgers. Also: the bakery makes a cake for the American Cancer Society's Relay For Life, a fundraiser that practically touches Buddy, Joey and Mauro personally: Buddy for his father, Joey for Sal, and Mauro for his mother.
79	22	"Campfire, Computers and a Concern"	July 25, 2011
Maddalena takes an order for a camping cake, but when the customer requests that the campfire in the cake be an actual campfire, Buddy is concerned that the fire would melt the cake. Also, Buddy makes a telephone cake for an Avaya convention – that really takes phone calls. Then, Buddy and Joey go to the factory to take a look at the new ovens, but they are concerned that they won't work.
80	23	"Prize Cow, Pop Tarts and Patience"	August 1, 2011
The bakers make a cake for a dairy farmer's prize cow; not only do they make it life-size, but Buddy also has it set up so it can be milked. Also, Buddy makes a cake for a boy whose family recently moved to Hoboken, with the cake being mostly made of Pop Tarts. Later, Joey, still having trouble on deciding between his firefighter or baker careers, asks Grace for advice.
81	24	"Chandelier Cake and a Christening"	September 26, 2011
Buddy works on one of his most challenging cakes to date: an edible chandelier cake that will be hung upside down. Also, Buddy's youngest son Carlo is baptized, and he decides to make a cake for the occasion
82	25	"Paleontology and Popping the Question"	September 26, 2011
Buddy and his children plan a surprise for his wife, Lisa for their 10th wedding anniversary. Meanwhile, a dinosaur-theme wedding cake is made for a couple who are getting married in a museum.
83	26	"State Fair, Syracuse Bound and Special Anniversary"	October 3, 2011
The State Fair Meadowlands is celebrating its 25th anniversary, and Buddy has the perfect cake in mind. Meanwhille, Joey and Grace's son have reason to celebrate as well: Rob has been accepted to Syracuse University. To mark this achievement, they're planning to enjoy an SU-themed cake.
84	27	"Transport Troubles & Two Brides"	October 3, 2011
A huge Chicago-theme cake is constructed to celebrate the opening of a Rolls-Royce dealership in the Windy City. Also: Buddy works on a cake for a very special couple from Long Island.
85	28	"Dear Buddy"	October 10, 2011
Note: This is a one-hour episode.
86	29	"A Funny Regis and Fifty Weddings"	October 10, 2011
Regis Philbin stops by the bakery for a lesson on cake decorating, for a segment for his morning show, Live with Regis and Kelly. Reege then invited Buddy to appear on his show, but little does he or co-host Kelly Ripa know, that Buddy has a special cake being made just for them. Also: a Korean bride requests a cake for her 50th wedding, as her unorthodox mission to get married in each of the fifty states comes to an end. Then, Joey's visited by his old fire chief, which leads to Joey's decision to choose whether to stay at the bakery or stay in firefighting become more difficult.
87	30	"Bees, Beware and Business"	October 10, 2011
Buddy makes a giant beehive cake made with real honey, in celebration of the first anniversary of the legalization of beekeeping in New York City. Also: a client seeks Buddy's help in pranking her husband on their wedding anniversary.
88	31	"Chocolate Race Cars and Choosing a Dress"	October 17, 2011
Race-car driver Danica Patrick stops by the bakery to order a cake for a COPD awareness campaign, based on a sculpture built by her husband. Meanwhile, Lisa and her sisters head to Kleinfeld Bridal in hopes that Lisa would Say Yes to the Dress for her vow-renewal ceremony; Randy Fenoli, Kleinfeld's fashion director, assists in Lisa's selection.
89	32	"Spirits and Spumoni"	October 24, 2011
Buddy makes a cake of the Jersey Devil for a group of professional ghost hunters, who hope to turn Buddy from a skeptic into a believer after he joins them on a ghost hunting expedition and comes into contact with Buddy's father. Later, Joey resurrects an old recipe for spumoni ice-cream cake. Meanwhile, Joey, still torn between two careers, makes a decision that would please Buddy, his firehouse, and himself.
90	33	"Coffins, Costumes and a Cake on a Gurney"	October 31, 2011
Buddy makes what could be one of the most unusual cakes ever – a man in a coffin for a group of "vampires", and they prefer Danny to be the model for the dead man. Meanwhile, a medical student requests a cake for a marriage proposal to a fellow student, which he plans to make in the ER ward at a local hospital.
91	34	"Soap, Sonograms and Surprise"	November 7, 2011
Buddy makes a washing machine cake in celebration of Tide detergent's 65th anniversary, but the general manager of Tide would like to see it spin. Also: an expecting couple would like a cake for their gender reveal party, with the filling determining the baby's gender – except that even the couple wants to be surprised. Later, the famiglia keeps pestering Lisa for details on her marriage renewal plans with Buddy: the whole family is going on a cruise, and Buddy and Lisa will renew their vows on a beach in the Bahamas.
92	35	"Props, Pies and Party Time!"	November 14, 2011
Buddy makes a cake for his brother-in-law's tiki-themed 21st birthday party, which is made to look like a bar that actually serves alcohol; however, the brother-in-law wanted the alcohol to be used as a fuel for fire, not as a beverage. Also: film producers Justin Zackham and Tom Shadyac order three wedding cakes – two real and one fake – for a film that they're shooting in Connecticut; Buddy makes one and leaves it to the assistants to make the other two, which must look exactly right. Then, Buddy and his two oldest sons get fitted for tuxes for the marriage renewal ceremony.
93	36	"Church Cake, Carats and Castano's Pool Party"	November 21, 2011
Buddy makes a church cake for Joey and Grace's 20th anniversary, a replica of the cake that they have when they got married. Later, Mauro makes a cake for a poolside party for his son's 12th birthday. Also: Buddy and Lisa shop for rings for their vow renewal ceremony.
94	37	"Family Feast"	November 24, 2011
The whole family comes together to make a big Italian Thanksgiving dinner. Note: This is a one-hour episode.
95	38	"Family Secrets"	November 28, 2011
Note: This is a one-hour episode.
96	39	"Bling, Barbecue and Blueprints"	November 28, 2011
Buddy makes a cake for a New York socialite which is decorated with $30 million worth of jewels. Buddy treats the staff at Lackawanna to a barbecue to thank them for all of their hard work. Meanwhile, plans are being made to completely renovate the original Carlo's Bakery in Hoboken.
97	40	"Cake Block, Cruise and a Carlo's Ceremony"	January 23, 2012
Buddy makes a cake to celebrate the one-year anniversary of Disney Cruise Line's ship, the ship also serve as a venue for Buddy and Lisa's cruise to the Bahamas, where they still renew, but when the rain threatens to put a damper on the beachside ceremony, Buddy cones with a plan to save the ceremony. Naturally, Buddy makes his own cake for the ceremony; however, he ended up suffering from mental block when he could not create an appropriate design for the cake.
98	41	"Touchdowns and Tattoos"	January 30, 2012
Buddy appears on Dan Patrick's radio show, to announce that he is making a Heisman Trophy cake for a special gala charity event, where Buddy meets one of his favorite football players, Vinny Testaverde. Also, Mauro gets a tattoo to show his love for his wife, Maddeline, in celebration of their 20th anniversary; Ami James and the crew from NY Ink guest star. Finally, Marissa Lopez, the winner of Season 2 of Next Great Baker ( which preceded this episode), started her first day working for Buddy, helping him decorate the Heisman Trophy cake, and learning that "all work and no play" does not strictly apply at Carlo's Bakery.

=== Season 5 (2012–13) ===
No. overall	No. in season	Title	Original release date	U.S. viewers (millions)
99	1	"Fitting In, Fed Up and a First Birthday"	May 28, 2012	1.83
Buddy and his crew make a candy mountain cake for his son Carlo's first birthday, complete with a chocolate "river". Marissa, as part of her ongoing internship, makes a two-tier cake for a "mystery" client. And on a busy day when customers are waiting in line for blocks, Mary shows up 45 minutes late for work, to the ire of Grace.
100	2	"Trash, Twirls and Tough Love"	May 28, 2012	1.92
Buddy makes a cake for a friend of his, a co-owner of a garbage transport service. His crew also makes a cake for an elderly female synchronized swimming team. Also: with discourse growing among the bakery staff, something has to give, and Buddy finds the source of the problem – Mary.
101	3	"Stained Glass and a Surprised Danny"	June 4, 2012	1.69
Following the events in the previous episodes, Buddy makes a difficult decision and dismisses Mary as manager, forbidding her from ever again taking the position at Carlo's Bakery. Also: Buddy makes a stained glass cake for Hoboken's Saints Peter and Paul Catholic Church, for the retirement of the church's music director. And the group trick Danny into making the filling for his own cake, celebrating his 50th birthday.
102	4	"Fast Hands and a Flaming Pearl"	June 4, 2012	1.62
Buddy and the group make a boxing bag cake for a boxing boot camp, challenging Anthony to a mixed martial arts match with a purple belt fighter; if he wins, he gets two days off, but if he loses, his hair gets sheared off. Also, the guys make a cake for a group's float in the Chinese New Year parade, complete with a large isomalt "pearl".
103	5	"Liberty, Layups and a Loaded Dinner"	June 11, 2012	1.69
Buddy makes a cake in honor of the 125th anniversary of the Statue of Liberty. As part of the celebration, 125 new citizens are sworn in, including Mauro, who finally realizes his dream of becoming an American citizen. Also: Buddy makes a cake for St. Anthony High School basketball coach Bob Hurley, who is celebrating their 26th state championship under him. But not everyone is in a celebrating mood as Mary gives everyone a piece of her mind at dinner, after being unceremoniously fired from her managerial job by Buddy.
104	6	"Bar Mitzvah, Beads and Oh Baby!"	June 11, 2012	1.74
Buddy makes one of their most unusual bar mitzvah cakes ever, not only in style but also in venue – a cake with a working slot machine for a high-roller bar mitzvah at The Venetian resort in Las Vegas. Then the crew makes a king cake for a Mardi Gras party at a local restaurant. But Buddy has a little surprise for Anthony, in retaliation for constantly interrupting him while he was with a client. Carmen Carrera also guests. Note: Due to complaints from Carrera of the episode making a joke out of her transgenderism, TLC pulled this episode from circulation, the day after broadcast. The episode has since returned to air on July 23, 2012, but with the offending scene reedited.
105	7	"Beer, Buttercups and Bumbling"	June 18, 2012	1.60
Buddy and his crew makes a cake for a microbrewery; not only must it actually dispense beer, it must also taste like beer. Then, they make a special Hawaiian-themed wedding cake for a couple getting married at the Philadelphia Flower Show. However, a cake delivery to Florida goes wrong when Buddy's cousin, Jay, strands a bakery van in Savannah, Georgia after accidentally filling the tank with gasoline instead of diesel fuel.
106	8	"Presidents, Peanut Butter & Popping-in"	June 25, 2012	1.55
Buddy makes a cake for the grandson of Luigi Del Bianco, the man who designed Mount Rushmore; however, the staff felt that this was the most-difficult cake they ever made. Also, Marissa is asked to make her special peanut butter cake for Buddy's wife, Lisa. Then, at the very end, Mary – who was fired earlier from her position by Buddy – returns to work, promising to help out the crew.
107	9	"Working at the Car Wash"	July 2, 2012	1.23
Buddy arranged for Mary to return to the bakery, placing her in charge of the consultations; however, Mauro and the others thought that she's making herself too much right at home. Meanwhile, Buddy and the crew make a special cake in celebration of a car wash's 1 millionth wash, by making a cake that can actually "wash" a car. And, Mauro makes a special cake for a couple's 75th wedding anniversary.
108	10	"Silly Seuss and Surprise!"	July 2, 2012	1.21
Cory Booker, the mayor of Newark, requests a Dr. Seuss-themed cake for a special function supporting children's literacy. The employees make a special cake for a surprise 35th birthday party for Buddy. But Mary had to distract Buddy as Grace confronts Joey and Frankie due to the sisters' disapproval of the cake's initial concept.
109	11	"Ice-ing on the Cake"	July 9, 2012	1.13
Buddy and the crew make a cake for the staff of Blue Sky Studios, in celebration for the completion of their latest film, Ice Age: Continental Drift. However, the successful arrival of the cake rests on Cousin Jay, who was still reeling from the fuel incident earlier in the season. Also, a lucky viewer and her family makes a cake with Buddy as part of their prize for TLC's "Watch and Win" contest.
110	12	"Going Up?"	July 9, 2012	1.11
Buddy makes a cake for the birthday of an elevator repairman's daughter, who was born on an elevator – to recreate the moment, they make a cake with a working elevator. Also, Mauro makes a cake for the North Jersey Spelling Bee; he uses this opportunity to quiz his co-workers on the spelling of some difficult words. Then, Marissa gets pranked with a pie in the face, in order for Buddy to show that life at Carlo's Bakery is not all serious.
111	13	"Under the Sea"	July 16, 2012	1.57
The crew makes a cake for an FBI agent who is retiring. But first, they make an undersea-themed cake for Joey and Grace's daughter, who's celebrating her 16th birthday; however, to load it into the van, they need to dodge an oncoming train.
112	14	"New Deli, New Design"	July 16, 2012	1.62
(Originally titled "That's Some Nice Meat") Buddy and the crew make a cake for a family deli, resembling a display case stocked with meats and cheeses. Also, Mary designs her first cake for the communion of Buddy's niece and nephews.
113	15	"Cakes on a Plane"	July 23, 2012	1.65
Buddy makes a cake for a man making his 50th parachute jump; however, the group wants to eat the cake while doing a jump, leading Buddy and the crew to find out how to make the cake aerodynamic. Also, Buddy makes a cake for his niece, who won a writing contest for her story about Carlo's Bakery.
114	16	"A Bittersweet Homecoming"	July 23, 2012	1.82
For Easter Week, Buddy's mother returns home to New Jersey, only to find out that she has Lou Gehrig's Disease. Buddy copes the best way he knows how – by making a special cake for her, by himself with no recipe.
115	17	"A Golden Opportunity"	November 26, 2012	1.29
Buddy makes a cake for a Friars' Club roast of Betty White; however, the life-sized cake, which normally takes four days to make, must be finished and delivered the next day, leaving Buddy and the crew with no time to lose and no room for error. Also, Buddy and his immediate family talk about treatment plans for his mother's disease, which includes eating fattening foods – such as cake.
116	18	"Ugly Feet and a Fiesta"	December 3, 2012	1.13
Celebrity couple Mario Lopez and Courtney Mazza commission Buddy to make them a one of a kind wedding cake and get it to their ceremony in Mexico. The fully completed cake is loaded onto a truck to be driven from New Jersey to Mexico and must pass through customs. Also, a local spa orders a cake for a Men's Ugly Foot Contest. The cake features "before" and "after" feet.
117	19	"From Fury to Furry"	December 3, 2012	1.20
Buddy plays mediator and makes a cake for a couple who can't agree on the design of the cake. Also, Buddy makes a cake for Petfinder.com to celebrate 20 million adoptions, along with an extra cake that can be eaten by animals.
118	20	"Operation: Tank Cake"	December 10, 2012	1.20
Buddy makes a cake fashioned like an army tank for a soldier being discharged after serving in Afghanistan. However, Buddy makes a special cake for the soldier's buddies back in Afghanistan, as part of a celebration being presented via satellite. Also, Buddy makes a cake for his daughter's Little League team, to celebrate the end of their season; however, he is not satisfied with even his own work.
119	21	"Hocus Pocus"	December 10, 2012	1.20
Magician Dan Sperry asks Buddy to create a cake for him, but does not give any directions on how it should look. Instead, he gives Buddy a sealed envelope containing a sketch of his prediction of how the cake will look, and asks Buddy to bake it into the cake and then reveal it on stage. Also, Buddy makes a cake for his son's preschool graduation ceremony.
120	22	"Buddy and the Rockettes"	December 17, 2012	1.23
To celebrate The Rockettes's 85th anniversary, Buddy is creating a cake with the famous Radio City Music Hall neon sign; a teenager who dreams of becoming a pilot gets a birthday cake surprise.
121	23	"Cut the Ribbon and the Cake!"	December 17, 2012	1.00
Buddy makes a special cake for the new Ann & Robert H. Lurie Children's Hospital in Chicago; the celebration has a personal connection with Joey and Grace, as their daughter, who suffered from epilepsy, was treated by a doctor who later moved to the children's hospital in Chicago. Also: Buddy makes a wedding cake for a couple whose color scheme is gray-based, making the decorating of the cake much more challenging.
122	24	"Twirls, Whirls and Crashes"	January 7, 2013	0.99
Buddy and the crew make their most challenging cake ever – an ornate, giant 2000-pound carousel cake for the Steel Pier in Atlantic City; however, all the hard work was for nothing when the cake collapsed en route to Atlantic City. Also, Carlo's Bakery undergoes a much-needed remodelling.
123	25	"Players, Lawyers and Pranksters"	January 7, 2013	0.91
Buddy makes a cake for New York Giants coach Tom Coughlin's charity, The Jay Fund, as well as do a little football practice with the team. Also, he makes a special briefcase cake for a new president of a local law association. And Marissa tries her hand at pranking the guys, but little does she know that she was supposed to always be one step ahead when she's involved in a pranking.
124	26	"Light Up the Night"	January 28, 2013	1.03
Buddy makes a special Bollywood-themed wedding cake that incorporates special effects. Also: Marissa tries out a new cookie recipe that she's created.
125	27	"Crane Cake and Puppy Love"	February 4, 2013	1.08
Buddy and crew make a crane cake for a local salvage company, as well as a very unusual wedding cake – for dogs.
126	28	"A Cowboy in Hoboken"	February 11, 2013	1.45
Buddy makes a special cake for country star Tim McGraw, at a concert where he'll be giving a house to a military veteran in need. Also, Ashley, the winner of Season 3 of Next Great Baker, begins her first day at work, where she found herself learning a couple of things from the previous season's winner, Marissa.
127	29	"Superheroes and Bakers Unite!"	February 18, 2013	1.29
Buddy and the crew make a cake for the 50th anniversary of Marvel Comics' greatest superhero, Spider-Man, complete with special effects where the story unfolds in front of the guests' eyes. Also: Ashley fails to make an impression on Buddy and Joey when she shows up late for work.
128	30	"We Will Survive"	February 18, 2013	1.51
The family puts on a special gala honoring Buddy's mother for the Mother Mary Foundation, where she sings a special duet of "I Will Survive" – with Gloria Gaynor. Al Roker of The Today Show and Randy Fenoli of Say Yes to the Dress feature as guests. Also: the crew makes a special chair cake for a furniture retailer. However, roughly a week later, Hurricane Sandy affects the entire Eastern Seaboard, including Hoboken and Jersey City, where Buddy and the crew inspect the damages at the Lackawanna location; the extent of the setback, which could be as little as a few days or as much as several months, all depends on whether the basement, which holds the bakery's transformer, has flooded.

=== Season 6 (2013–14) ===
No. overall	No. in season	Title	Original release date	U.S. viewers (millions)
129	1	"Hurricane Sandy Strikes"	May 27, 2013	1.65
Continuing from the previous episode, Hurricane Sandy spares Carlo's Bakery's Hoboken and Lackawanna locations from damage. However, without any electricity, making cakes for customers can be a big challenge, to the point where some customers who did not cancel or postpone their events will have to make do with fake cakes. Whether or not the power will go back on at Lackawanna depends on whether or not the bakery's transformer, which would take at least a couple of months to replace, is damaged.
130	2	"Welcome Back Robin!"	May 27, 2013	1.53
Buddy and his crew make a cake for Robin Roberts, an anchor for Good Morning America, who returned to the program following some time off for cancer treatments. Also, the gang makes a cake for an instructor in a stationary bicycling class, as a tribute to his fellow instructor and mentor. Ralph helps Marco make a greeting card for Buddy, to show that he's with him while Buddy works hard making the cakes. And Buddy takes the first look at Carlo's Bakery's newest location in Ridgewood, New Jersey.
131	3	"Cake Smash"	June 3, 2013	1.26
Buddy and the crew make a wedding dress cake for a bridal shop, where they hold a special competition – the first person to find a gold coin hidden in the cake wins a dress; but to find the coin, the brides-to-be have to dig in – literally. And a photographer requests "smash cakes" for a small group of one-year-olds. Later: Paul Conti, a former contestant of season 3 of Next Great Baker, asks Buddy for a job after Hurricane Sandy left him without a job or a home.
132	4	"Sugary Slopes"	June 3, 2013	1.26
The crew works on a special cake for the Windham Mountain ski resort, which resembles a ski slope with a working chair lift; later, Buddy challenges the gang on a down-slope snowboard race, where the loser gets pelted with snowballs. Paul starts work at the bakery, to the discomfort of his Next Great Baker teammate, Ashley; but Buddy reminds both that the job should not be treated as a competition. And, Lisa and the kids make a cake for Buddy's birthday.
133	5	"Rebuilds and Raw Fish"	June 10, 2013	1.00
Buddy makes a cake for a special Rebuild Hoboken initiative, as a special favor to Hoboken mayor Dawn Zimmer to help gather funds to assist in rebuilding and repairing damaged homes and businesses in Hoboken; but what was meant to be eaten at the function ended up being auctioned off to the highest bidder. Also: a Japanese restaurant requests a special sushi boat cake for one of their frequent customers.
134	6	"Seeing Double"	June 10, 2013	0.97
Buddy and the gang rush to prepare the new Ridgewood location of Carlo's Bakery to open on time. But Mother Nature has the last say when a blizzard was forecast, which could put a damper on the grand opening. Also, identical twin sisters request a cake for their mother's 70th birthday, but they couldn't make up their minds on what cake to make.
135	7	"Snowed Out"	June 17, 2013	0.91
A blizzard is threatening the grand opening of Carlo's Bakery in Ridgewood, leading Buddy to decide whether or not to postpone the opening. Furthermore, one of its new ovens were not working properly, adding to the extra stress. Also: a toy manufacturer requests a cake for a revival of the 1980s Power Lords line of action figures.
136	8	"From Russia With Cake"	June 17, 2013	1.04
Buddy and the crew make a cake for a restaurant's 20th anniversary, in the style of Moscow's Saint Basil's Cathedral. Also, Ashley gets angry after Paul cracks a joke in reference to her upcoming marriage, leading to Grace and Mary, both often at odds themselves, to do a little intervention.
137	9	"Glow in the Dark Cake"	June 24, 2013	1.17
Buddy and the crew make a cake for a zombie-themed fashion show, and the cake must glow under black lights. Ralph and Ashley team up to create the cake. Later, Ashley takes part as a model in the show. Also, a customer asks Buddy whether it is possible to get a cake quickly, and if not, is there someone else he can recommend? Buddy takes this as a challenge and creates a cake on the spot.
138	10	"Muscles and Marriage"	July 1, 2013	1.35
After eating nothing but tilapia and asparagus for months while training, a female bodybuilder asks Buddy to create a cake that she and her friends can enjoy, with a life-size sculpture of her on the top. Also, a man and his proposal planner approach Mauro with the idea of staging a proposal at the cake decorating classroom at Lackawanna.
139	11	"Easter Basket Case"	July 8, 2013	1.06
Buddy is having a hard time keeping sufficient inventory between the two bakeries for the Easter rush and knows that changes are needed. Also, a representative from Autism Speaks asks Buddy to create an Easter Basket-themed cake for their Easter Egg Hunt. And the grandkids make a scrapbook for Momma after she receives discouraging news about her ALS progress.
140	12	"Fire and Ice"	July 15, 2013	1.09
The crew makes a cake for New York City firefighters and paramedics who saved the life of construction worker Joe Barrone, who sank chest-deep in the mud at a subway construction site in March 2013. Also, a night club request two cakes, one representing "fire" and the other representing "ice", as part of the club's "Fire and Ice" theme; this motivated Buddy to make a bet with Ashley to see who makes the best cake; the loser, as determined by polling the employees, delivers the cakes.
141	13	"Hair Raising"	July 22, 2013	1.24
A member of a mustache club asks Buddy to create a cake with a mustache that is able to grow. Also, Buddy creates a cake for his son's first Communion celebration.
142	14	"Buttercream Submarine"	July 29, 2013	1.25
Buddy is asked to create a submarine-themed cake for the Navy's 113th Annual Submarine Birthday Ball. Paul helped out because he formerly served on a submarine. This was Paul's last cake for Carlo's since he has found another job. Also, Mauro is asked to create a cake for a Bat Mitzvah but is unsure how to proceed because of the large number of requirements.
143	15	"Camp Carlo's"	August 5, 2013	0.97
Buddy is asked to create a cake for Rolling River Day Camp's 20th anniversary. As a surprise, it should also open up and reveal a replica of the camp owners' wedding cake from the 1970s. Also, a women's dodgeball team has received a small trophy and they want a big trophy-themed cake for their celebration. Buddy makes a bet that he and his team of bakers can beat them in dodgeball.
144	16	"Momma's Birthday Surprise"	August 12, 2013	1.11
Buddy wants to make a special cake for Momma's 65th birthday. He plans to make a cream puff cake, which is her favorite, but with multiple tiers, which he has never done before. Also, Buddy and the crew make a cake for Rebuilding New Jersey and take part in a Habitat for Humanity project in Atlantic City. And, Buddy's uncle hears of a new experimental treatment for Momma's ALS. It requires a bone marrow donor. All of his mother's siblings agree to be tested to see if they are a match. Note: This is a one-hour episode.
145	17	"Gator Bite"	December 30, 2013	N/A
The Adventure Aquarium in Camden NJ asks Buddy to create a cake featuring a replica of their 14-foot alligator. Also, a former Mrs. New Jersey orders a cake for this year's pageant. She gives rather vague requirements but emphasizes that the cake must be perfect. And, Momma receives her treatment in Israel and returns home.
146	18	"On the Road Again"	December 30, 2013	N/A
Buddy and the crew are asked to design a cake for Willie Nelson's 80th birthday party. Buddy would like to attend but is scheduled to attend a dinner at the same time, where his wife is to be honored. Also, Buddy creates a cake for his daughter's 10th birthday party.
147	19	"¡Viva Cake Boss!"	January 6, 2014	1.25
A mariachi band asks Buddy to create a cake for a Cinco de Mayo party. They give Buddy a detailed design but he thinks of a way to improve upon it. Also, a hair salon across the street from Carlo's in Ridgewood asks Buddy to design a cake for their grand opening. Buddy's sisters and wife receive new hairstyles for the party.
148	20	"Pimp My Cake"	January 6, 2014	1.10
A group asks Buddy to create a cake for a Roman toga party. Also, a lowrider club asks Buddy to create a cake that bounces and moves like one of their cars. Ralph is concerned that the cake will fall apart. And, Buddy has been having lower back pains and begins taking yoga classes.
149	21	"Next Great Bride"	January 13, 2014	0.81
Ashley is preparing for her wedding day, and she has designed her own cakes. The wedding cake features taxidermy mice on the top, and the groom's cake features a dog and chicken playing ping-pong. Anthony bets Buddy that he can beat him in a game of ping-pong.
150	22	"Carlo's Cowboys"	January 13, 2014	0.92
A rodeo association asks Buddy to create a cake that captures the spirit of the cowboy. Several family members get a chance to participate in rodeo activities. Also, a couple asks for a cake that will be used in their wedding, which is to be a surprise to their families.
151	23	"Sicilian Samurai"	January 20, 2014	0.97
Buddy and the crew create a cake in the shape of a Samurai warrior in honor of the New York Budokai's 50th Anniversary. Also, Buddy is asked to create a patriotic-themed cake for the inaugural ceremony of the new Mayor of Jersey City. The cake is fitted with an air cannon that will shoot confetti. Buddy is concerned that the force will cause the cake to explode.
152	24	"Down the Drain"	January 27, 2014	0.93
A woman says that her boyfriend will eat anything, and wants to surprise him with a garbage disposal cake that will dispense ground-up food. Also, a couple who own a tow truck company are getting married. Their groom's cake will be a tow truck, and it will winch the wedding cake up onto itself.
153	25	"Icing the Cake"	February 3, 2014	N/A
Buddy is asked to make a goalie-shaped cake for the 2013 NHL entry draft in Newark, as well as an extra cake to play a prank on sportscaster Darren Dreger. Also, Buddy is asked to reproduce a couple's original wedding cake for their 50th Anniversary. The cake features hung sugar which is very delicate and therefore must be applied on-site by Mauro. And, Momma's condition seems to be improving, but it is still early in the process.
154	26	"Biceps and Birthdays"	February 10, 2014	0.72
Buddy creates a cake for an arm wrestling tournament. Several construction and delivery issues have to be overcome. Also, Mauro wants to do something special to surprise his wife on her birthday. He creates a cake and their children prepare dinner.
155	27	"Fiery Competition"	February 17, 2014	0.83
Buddy and the crew create a cake to celebrate Joe's promotion to Lieutenant in the Harrison NJ Fire Department. The cake will be set on fire and must put itself out. Also, Buddy is asked to create a cake for a Bocce tournament. He puts together a team of bakers to play a game at the tournament.
156	28	"Up, Up and Away"	February 24, 2014	N/A
Buddy is asked to create a cake for a Hot Air Balloon festival. The cake should be delivered in a balloon. Also, a French restaurant wants Buddy to create a tall Napoleon cake. Also, Momma goes to Israel for another round of treatment. The results will not be known for a month. Additionally, Ashley leaves to start her own bakery, Anthony gets frustrated with Buddy and suddenly resigns, and Buddy throws a thank you party for the staff at his house. Note: This is a one-hour episode.

=== Season 7 (2015) ===
No. overall	No. in season	Title	Original release date	U.S. viewers (millions)
157	1	"Everything Old Is New Again"	September 8, 2015	1.15
The renovations to the original Carlo's Bakery in Hoboken are revealed.
158	2	"The Butcher and the Baker"	September 8, 2015	1.15
Buddy and the crew create a meat-themed cake for a butcher company in exchange for a side of beef. Also, an ice fishing cake is created for a lake resort.
159	3	"Naked Fishing"	September 8, 2015	1.15
Buddy makes a bet that he can catch a 10-inch fish that will be displayed in the cake. Also, Buddy makes a classic cake for his son's fourth birthday. He also creates a "naked cake" (which is unfrosted) even though it is against his general principles.
160	4	"Bridges, Beaches and Bad News"	September 15, 2015	0.64
Buddy is asked to create a cake for a benefit for the Common Ground Foundation. Common and John Legend will be present and will be performing Glory, a song from the soundtrack to the movie Selma. Buddy makes a replica of the Edmund Pettus Bridge. Also, a couple wants a cake that combines the themes of beaches and farms, and Buddy finds a way. And, Mauro suffers a concussion when he falls in the bathroom and is taken to the hospital.
161	5	"Big Beast, Brownie Blunders and Back to Baking"	September 15, 2015	0.69
Buddy is asked to create a cake to commemorate Singapore's 50th Anniversary. It should incorporate flavors that are typically used in Singaporean desserts. They create a Merlion-themed cake. Also, the Lisas note that the brownies in the bakery are not as moist as they should be. Buddy tries several variations and finally looks to an old recipe for guidance. And, Mauro returns to work.
162	6	"Cake of Thrones"	September 22, 2015	0.81
Buddy and the crew create a gryphon cake for a live-action role playing (LARP) group. Also, a globe-themed cake is created for exchange students who are about to return home. And, Mauro has lost weight and the famiglia helps him shop for new clothes.
163	7	"Kid Crush and Carnival"	September 22, 2015	0.75
Buddy helps his son Marco create a Valentine's Day cake. Also, a client wants a Carnival-themed cake for her Brazilian restaurant, but the crew is confused by some of the requirements, which are given in Portuguese.
164	8	"Sweet Chicken and Sweeter Revenge"	September 29, 2015	0.90
Buddy and the crew create a large chicken and waffles themed cake to celebrate the first anniversary of a restaurant. And, Gabby and Marissa plot to play a prank on Frankie, who has pranked them so often in the past. Also, Buddy is asked to create a cake based on a picture of a monster that was drawn by a classroom of children.
165	9	"Bacon, Banana and Bling"	September 29, 2015	0.87
An Irish group creates "St. Piggy's Day" to link St. Patrick's Day and pork. Buddy and the crew create a leprechaun pig that includes candied bacon. And, Lisa says that the banana cream pies are not selling well, and Buddy sees that they are not being made the traditional way. He holds a bake-off between the traditional recipe and a new recipe. Also, Mary has the idea of creating a blinged-out clothing line for the bakery, and Buddy lets her try it.
166	10	"Pizza, Petals and Pandemonium"	October 6, 2015	0.87
Buddy and the crew create a cake in the shape of a 12-foot slice of pizza for a pizzeria's 110th anniversary. And, a florist asks for a cake with many flowers, but Buddy changes it to a cake with one large flower. Also, Buddy has to watch his sons and they are bored, so he handles the situation the same way his father did when Buddy was a boy.
167	11	"Hats, Hamantaschen & Head Baker"	October 6, 2015	0.75
The Milliners Guild asks for a cake shaped like an Easter bonnet for the Easter parade. And, a Jewish group wants a cake with hamantash cookies for Purim, and Buddy experiments with new fillings. Also, Head Baker Joe asks Head Mixer German to fill in for him while he is away. German has to deal with Grace and Danny.
168	12	"High Tea and Hot Rods"	October 13, 2015	0.90
The owners of a British tea room ask for a cake for the (then-)upcoming birth of the Duke and Duchess of Cambridge's second child. The cake cannot be pink or blue since at the time the gender was not known. And, Mary's brother-in-law's auto body shop is celebrating its 30th anniversary and he wants a cake shaped and painted like a hot rod. Several construction issues must be overcome.
169	13	"Lights, Camera, Cake"	October 13, 2015	0.97
The Tribeca Film Festival requests a cake for the Filmmakers Arrival Reception. Buddy's wife and sisters are interested in helping to deliver this cake. And, a couple requests a cake for their daughter's Sweet 16 party. Since they are repeat customers, Buddy gives them something extra.
170	14	"College, Cherry and Challenges"	October 20, 2015	0.93
Joe and Grace's son Robert is graduating from Syracuse University and a cake is made for his party. And, the Essex (NJ) County Executive asks for a Cherry Blossom cake for the park. Also, a culinary student from England boasts that he can make better cannoli than Buddy. The Boss accepts the challenge.
171	15	"Mother's Day and Men in Uniform"	October 27, 2015	0.74
Buddy makes a cake for Momma on Mother's Day. He is also anxious to find out what she thinks of the renovations to the bakery. And, the Navy requests a cake for the end of New York City Fleet Week 2015. Also, now that the kids are out of the house, Grace needs a hobby. She and her sisters try golf.
172	16	"Best Buds and Baseball Gloves"	November 3, 2015	0.82
Six friends are celebrating their 50th birthdays together. The cake cannot be individualized so Buddy makes a cake with a layer for each decade. And, Buddy's son's baseball league wants a cake that will serve 800. Also, Mauro and Madeline's son Buddy C. learns CPR so he can help in an emergency.
173	17	"Crabs, Communion and a Comeback Pastry"	November 10, 2015	0.60
The owner of the Red Bank Marina wants a crab cake to celebrate the opening of crabbing season. He also wants the claws to move, which presents several technical challenges. And, Buddy makes a special cake for his son Marco's first Communion. Also, the crew makes zeppoles and Mary and Madeline help to sell them on the street.
174	18	"Miss Richfield, Matryoshkas and a Melt Down"	November 10, 2015	0.63
Miss Richfield 1981, the Season 2 client, is hosting NYC Pride Family Movie Night and Buddy makes a rainbow-themed cake. And, the owners of a Russian restaurant ask for a Matryoshka cake with gingerbread and honey for Russian Heritage Month. Also, Liz feels the stress of a busy wedding cake season.
175	19	"Windmill, Wedding Cake Twist, Winding Down"	November 17, 2015	0.86
While Buddy is away, Mauro produces a large windmill cake for Hofstra University's Dutch Festival. And, a couple wants a wedding cake with a stair step design and a humorous topper. Also, after a long day at work, the guys relax at Danny's social club.
176	20	"Picky Nikki, Fresh Catch and Date Night"	November 17, 2015	0.94
Buddy's personal assistant Nikki is getting married and Buddy makes her a special cake. And, a charter fishing company wants a tuna-shaped cake to honor one of their captains. Also, Buddy's wife Lisa surprises him with a romantic meal at the shop.
177	21	"Extra Helping"	November 24, 2015	0.73
Note: This is a one-hour episode.

=== Season 8 (2016–17) ===
No. overall	No. in season	Title	Original release date	U.S. viewers (millions)
178	1	"Pirates and Pastries"	August 23, 2016	0.77
Buddy and the crew are asked to create a pirate-themed cake for a pirate park on the Jersey Shore. Also, Buddy opens another bakery at the Mohegan Sun along with a new concept: plated desserts.
179	2	"Sand Castles and Seeing Double"	August 23, 2016	0.77
Buddy is invited to Asbury Park, NJ by the Mayor and given a friendly challenge to create a sand castle-themed cake to compete against a sand castle made by a professional sand sculptor. Also, twins are having a birthday and their mother wants to surprise them with a cake, even though each twin has quite different preferences. Buddy asks a twin on his staff for advice.
180	3	"Botanical Cakes and Anti-Lock Brakes"	August 30, 2016	0.61
Buddy is asked to create a cake for the New York Botanical Garden that features desert plants for Hispanic Heritage Month. Also, Buddy made a wedding cake for a same-sex couple ten years ago, and now on their anniversary they can legally wed and they ask Buddy to make another cake for them. And, Mauro and Madeline's son Buddy C is learning to drive.
181	4	"Mary Models, Toys and Turkish Marbling"	August 30, 2016	0.61
Mary thinks she has what it takes to become a foot model. Also, the crew finds their inner child creating a cake to celebrate a toy's anniversary. And, Buddy learns about Turkish marbling when preparing for a cake for a Turkish group.
182	5	"Fairy Tales, Farewells and Fake Noses"	September 6, 2016	0.59
A cake is made to honor Hans Christian Andersen and his works. Also, a gymnast is moving to Oregon and her teammates want to honor her with a special cake at a farewell party. And, Grace wants to be a secret shopper to test the customer service, but she needs a disguise.
183	6	"Wine and Waltzes"	September 6, 2016	0.59
A winemaking family is celebrating an anniversary and they want a wine-themed cake that includes wine as an ingredient. Also, Shenandoah University has been doing a fundraiser to buy pianos, and they want a full-size piano cake. Can the crew deliver the top-heavy 1000-pound cake to Virginia in one piece?
184	7	"Bugging Out and Big Cheers"	September 13, 2016	0.53
Liberty Science Center is opening a new exhibit devoted to the leafcutter ant, and they ask Buddy to create an appropriate cake. And, Mary's son Joseph is in a wrestling match. Also, Mauro creates a megaphone out of cupcakes for a cheerleading squad.
185	8	"Spies, Splashes and Bakery Love"	September 13, 2016	0.53
Buddy creates a cake for the Global Gaming Expo in Las Vegas. After delivering the cake, the crew relaxes with a dip in the pool at the Palazzo Resort. And, Mauro's brother Stefano is getting married and a special beach-themed cake is created for the couple.
186	9	"Momma's Day, Floral Favors and Cake Clinics"	September 30, 2017	0.93
Buddy creates a flower covered cake, complete with a rose flavored filling for a Mother's Day brunch; Lisa and Sofia help Buddy host a special decorating class; the Valastro family celebrates Momma, and all the other wonderful mothers in the family.
187	10	"Farewell to Momma Mary"	September 30, 2017	0.93
A tribute to Buddy's mother, Mary Valastro (1948–2017), brings the family together to honor her legacy, influence, and triumphs.
188	11	"Buddha, Brandenburg and Big Air"	September 30, 2017	0.93
A replica Brandenburg Gate for the German Embassy's party; a gold Buddha statue.
189	12	"Steins, Stethoscopes and Studs"	September 30, 2017	0.93
The guys make a beer cake for a local Oktoberfest celebration; the hospital where all four Valastro kids were born has a special cake order.
190	13	"Helicopters and Hypnosis"	October 7, 2017	0.61
The team creates a complicated helicopter cake complete with spinning rotors; Mauro's intense fear of heights is triggered, so Buddy brings in a hypnotist; Grace takes an order from a donut obsessed bride.
191	14	"Red, White and Chew"	October 7, 2017	0.61
Buddy makes a giant hot dog cake for the famous 4th of July hot dog eating contest at Coney Island; an order for a BBQ pit master has Joe attempting a pork belly cake filling.
192	15	"Snowman, Mentor and Model Mary"	October 7, 2017	0.61
Buddy makes a life-size snowman cake for a group of pre-schoolers.
193	16	"Hay Bales and a Health Scare"	October 7, 2017	0.61
A long-time customer's family farm wants a harvest themed cake to kick off the fall season; Mauro gets some shocking news and must undergo surgery.
194	17	"High Kicks, Hockey Sticks and Capoeira"	October 14, 2017	0.60
A martial art's studio is celebrating their graduating class, and wants a cake that represents the Brazilian tradition Capoeira; Mauro helps a boy celebrate his Bar Mitzvah with a cake that shows off his love of hockey.
195	18	"Taj Mahal and Prom Proposal"	October 14, 2017	0.60
An Indian couple asks for an exact replica of the Taj Mahal, but the intricate design may be more than Buddy and his team can handle; Grace helps a couple of boys ask their girlfriends to prom with an over-the-top surprise cake.
196	19	"Tall Orders and Tight Fit"	October 21, 2017	0.69
It's a dumpling feast for the eyes when Buddy makes a cake for a New York food tour company; Buddy creates an iconic motorcycle jacket out of cake.
197	20	"Gems, Geodes and Cake Boss Junior"	October 21, 2017	0.69
Buddy and the team rock a crystal cake for a gemstone gallery's 50th anniversary celebration, and his 5-year-old son takes over Carlo's Bakery.
198	21	"Creeps, Carvings and Coffins"	October 28, 2017	0.47
When Halloween arrives in Hoboken, Buddy and co brave a haunted house for a consultation, and Frankie's coffin prank on Gabby nearly scares her to death.
199	22	"Classic Cars and Grace's Surprise"	October 28, 2017	0.47
Joe has big plans to surprise Grace with an ice cream cake for her 50th birthday, but extreme heat may just melt the surprise before she arrives. Buddy must turn a classic car into an unforgettable cake.
200	23	"Lumber Jacks and Giving Back"	November 4, 2017	0.63
Two professional lumberjacks tie the knot and Buddy makes a tree-inspired wedding cake; Carlo's shop gives back to Feeding America, and Buddy promises a meal for all the volunteers at the Hoboken shelter.
201	24	"Monkey Business and Mary in Charge"	November 4, 2017	0.63
Buddy and his family go snow tubing in the Poconos; Mary and Carlo make a cake for a zoo celebrating the Chinese Year of the Monkey; Buddy Castano is getting ready for college, but Mauro and Madeline aren't ready to let go.
202	25	"Home Runs and Rabbit Holes"	November 11, 2017	0.63
When a children's theater asks Buddy to make an Alice in Wonderland cake, he falls deep into the rabbit hole; Mauro creates a vintage baseball-themed cake for the Carlos Beltran Foundation.
203	26	"Quinceaneras, Quarterbacks and K9's"	November 11, 2017	0.63
A mother and daughter need a traditional yet modern cake for a quinceanera party; a cake for dog groomers; Buddy and Lisa go head to head about their son Marco playing football.
204	27	"Camels, Ostriches and Cake Wishes"	November 18, 2017	0.50
Buddy head to Meadowlands Racetrack with a cake for the infamous camel and ostrich races; the bakery receives a visit from a few families with the Make-A-Wish Foundation.
205	28	"Mummy Mia!"	November 18, 2017	0.50
Buddy is asked to create an Egypt-themed cake for the Rutgers Geology Museum.
206	29	"Soccer and Mary's Big Break"	November 25, 2017	0.52
The professional soccer team F.C. Internazionale is in Hoboken from Italy, and Buddy and the guys are making them a cake; it's a dream come true for Mauro and Danny, who have been fans since childhood; Mary dips her toes in becoming a foot model.
207	30	"Leather, Lace and a Princess Cake"	November 25, 2017	0.52
Buddy creates a leather-and-lace cake for an all-female motorcycle club; A lucky 5-year-old gets a perfect, pink, princess cake.
208	31	"Wintery Wonderland Wedding"	December 2, 2017	0.42
A winter wonderland-themed wedding inspires Buddy to leave his comfort zone; sugar artist Jacques Torres helps complete the icy dream cake.
209	32	"Seasons Greetings and Saintly Surprises"	December 2, 2017	0.42
At Christmas, the Valastros throw their annual party to give back to their community and Buddy creates a magical Christmas tree cake.

=== Season 9 (2019–20) ===
No. overall	No. in season	Title	Original release date
210	1	"Fiery Dragons and Marrying Cats"	May 18, 2019
Buddy turns up the heat with a fire breathing dragon cake for a modern day medieval knight; A cat cafe wants Mary to make a cake for a feline wedding, and to officiate it.
211	2	"Flamenco and Capture The Flag"	May 18, 2019
Buddy flaunts his dance moves when he designs a flamenco cake; Mauro and the team make a cake for a nearby summer camp.
212	3	"Color Run and School Fun"	May 25, 2019
The team go back to school with a cake to mark an event for the mayor of Newark providing school supplies for kids; Madeline is tasked with a rainbow cake for a charity run.
213	4	"Go Fly a Kite"	May 25, 2019
Buddy Valastro, the Cake Boss, judges a true “clash-of-the-titans” cook-off between local police and firefighters. The event is complete with two fabulous cakesto celebrate.
214	5	"Wedding Bells and Flower Power"	June 1, 2019
Buddy meets a floral-loving bride who wants bouquets of flower cupcakes for her big day; Mauro celebrates his 25th wedding anniversary with Madeline in romantic style.
215	6	"Diggerland, Dol and Dresses"	June 1, 2019
Buddy and his team tackle two intriguing cake challenges: 1. Korean-Themed First Birthday Cake: Mauro showcases his culinary artistry by creating a captivating cake for a Korean-themed first birthday celebration. The cake likely incorporates elements inspired by Korean culture and traditions. 2.25th Weeding Anniversary Dress Selection: Madeline, celebrating her 25th weeding anniversary, seeks the perfect dress for the occasion. Buddy assists her in choosing a gown that reflects both elegance and sentimental value. 3. Digger Theme Park Cake: Buddy faces an exciting task- baking a cake for a digger theme park. Imagine a cake that captures both: the spirit of construction vehicles and adventure. Note: This episode promises a delightful blend of creativity, cultural flair, and celebration, making it a must-watch episode for both: Cake Boss fans and cake enthusiasts alike.
216	7	"Viking Ships and Ice Cream Cones"	June 8, 2019
Buddy and his team take on two delightful challenges: 1.Viking-Themed Cake: Buddy creates an amazing inspired by Norse mythology for the crew of a reproduction Viking ship that crossed the treacherous North Atlantic. The cake plays homage to their adventurous voyage and the spirit of ancient seafarers. 2. Multi-Flavored Ice Cream Cake Cone Cake: As if one were not enough, Buddy also crafts a massive cake shaped like a colorful, multi-flavored ice cream cone. It is a whimsical treat that combines the joy of ice cream with the artistry of cake design. Note: This episode beautifully blends history, adventure, and sweet indulgence, making it a must-watch for cake enthusiasts and fans of culinary creativity.
217	8	"Mermaids, Promotions and Puppy Love"	June 8, 2019
Buddy and his team embark on a delightful trio of cake challenges: 1.Mermaid Cake Design: Buddy fulfills his dream of creating a captivating mermaid-themed cake. This enchanting confection is inspired by an aquarium that hosts mermaids who gracefully swim in the tanks for visitors. 2.Promotion Celebration: Mauro, the pastry chef, crafts a special cake to honor a family friend who has just been promoted to chief of police. The cake serves as a sweet tribute to their achievement. 3.Unexpected Puppy Surprise: Lisa, always full of surprises, introduces a new member of the family- a dog. However, this furry addition may not quite fit the role of the guard dog Buddy had in Mind. Note: The episode beautifully blends creativity, celebration and unexpected twists, making it a treat for both cake enthusiasts and viewers alike.
218	9	"Ballet and South African Biltong"	June 15, 2019
Buddy Valastro faces one of his most unusual challenges yet- he is tasked with creating a cake that incorporates South African biltong, which is a type of dried, cured meat similar to beef jerky. While Buddy is known for his ability to incorporate unique ingredients into his cakes, this request certainly tests his culinary creativity. Meanwhile, the rest of the bakery team is busy working on a music-box-themed cake. This particular creation is not just a feast for the eyes but also for the ears, as it's designed to embody the elegance and grace of a ballet dancer. The team's efforts to perfect the cake get them dancing, adding a touch of lighthearted fun to the episode. This episode showcases the versatility and skill of Buddy and his team as they blend the art of baking with the unexpected twist of incorporating biltong, all the while paying homage to the delicate beauty of ballet through their cake design.
219	10	"25 Years and Counting"	June 22, 2019
Mauro and Madeline celebrate their 25th wedding anniversary with the whole famiglia.
220	11	"Creepy Crawly Cake and Haunted House"	June 29, 2019
It's Halloween and Buddy's eldest son wants a haunted house to match his spooky cake. Carlo's crew create an intricate carved pumpkin cake.
221	12	"Dreams Come True"	July 6, 2019
Rapper Fat Joe wants a cake to celebrate his new hit single, and Buddy's design is as good as gold. Plus, the team create a Gingerbread man-inspired cake.
222	13	"Pep Rally, Birthday Treat and Fancy Feet"	July 13, 2019
Mike Harris has served in the army and had over 10 deployments since being married to his wife, Bren, yet he still looks to her as the real hero; He sits down with Grace to order a Sentimental cake for his wife's 40th birthday.
223	14	"Secret Proposal, Patients and Privacy Please"	July 20, 2019
Buddy gets a visit from Leah, a seven-year-old baker he met in Malaysia. Mauro and Madeline help a young man propose to his sweetheart.
224	15	"Enduring Love, an Ending and Edited Out"	July 27, 2019
Buddy helps Lisa's grandparents to celebrate their anniversary by recreating their six-tier wedding cake. Grace shoots a training video that goes down badly.
225	16	"Holly Jolly Hoboken and Ugly Sweaters"	August 3, 2019
It's the holiday season, and the team makes a train cake for the New York Botanical Garden Train Show. Plus, the team creates an "Ugly Sweater" cake.
226	17	"Pinata Party and Gender Reveal"	August 10, 2019
Buddy is challenged to create a piñata cake by two 11-year-old DJs. Plus, two expectant mothers order a gender-reveal cake- will it be pink or it will be blue?
227	18	"Glass Cake and 100th Birthday"	August 17, 2019
The team creates a sugar-craft cake to mimic beautiful glass art and Lisa takes a Special order for a family patriarch's 100th birthday.
228	19	"Father-Daughter Dance and Bachelorette Party"	August 24, 2019
Mauro gets a very sweet cake order for a father-daughter dance; Buddy takes an order from a bride-to-be for her bachelorette party.
229	20	"Robots and Rainbow Unicorns"	August 31, 2019
Buddy and his team make two special cakes: one with a robot theme and another with a unicorn theme Here is a summary of the episode: 1.The Robot Cake: Buddy gets an order to make a robot cake for a gala that honors the world's most advanced robot. He decided to make a retro-style robot cake, inspired by the sci-fi movies from the 1950s. The cake is over a meter tall and is decorated with metallic details and lights. The robot can even move and talk, thanks to a remote-control system hidden inside the cake.: 2. The Unicorn Cake: Mary helps makes a dream cake for a five-year-old girl who loves unicorns, with a golden horn and a rainbow mane. The cake is covered with fondant and glitter, and is full of surprises: candies, marshmallows and chocolate. The girl is delighted by her magical cake and thanks Buddy for his creativity.
230	21	"Steampunks, Kiwi Cake and Babysitting Jitters"	September 7, 2019
before the team can build a cake for the Steampunk World's Fair, they must first figure out what steampunk is; Also Buddy makes a cake with kiwi birds and kiwifruit to capture the essence of New Zealand; as Buddy babysits the kids, one goes missing.
231	22	"Color Festival, Sofia's Graduating and a Paint Date"	September 21, 2019
Buddy creates an intricate cake for the Indian Holi festival that brightens the bakery.
232	23	"Ships Ahoy, Mary's Mix-Up and Elevator Error"	September 28, 2019
Buddy and his team are tasked with creating a three-tiered cake for a local yacht club centennial anniversary. The cake features nautical motifs, seashell details and a miniature ship on top. Meanwhile, Mary is left in charge of the bakery and struggles to juggle multiple cake orders and impatient customers. She accidentally decorates the wrong cake and must fix the mistake before the customer arrives. The crew also has to contend with a malfunctioning elevator that threatens to derail their day. They find creative solutions to keep the bakery running smoothly, such as carrying heavy equipment up, multiple flights of stairs and sending cakes down a makeshift zip line.
233	24	"Father's Day Collapse, Buddy's Surprise and Tee Time"	October 5, 2019
The crew makes a basketball-inspired cake as a Father's Day surprise for a hoop-mad dad. But disaster strikes during delivery.
234	25	"Mining Cake, Sailing Santa and Sister Makeovers"	October 26, 2019
Buddy and his team embark on two intrguing cake challenges: 1.Minig Cake: Deep beneath the ground in western New Jersey, Buddy and his sons explore an old zinc mine that boasts glowing minerals. The president of the mine wants a cake to surprise young geologists on their next mine visit. 2.Sailing Santa: In this festive segment, Buddy crafts a cake featuring Santa Claus sailing on a boat. Its a blend of holiday cheer and nautical adventure. 3. Sister Makeovers: The sisters have a cosmetic injection, adding a touch of glamour to their lives. Buddy creates their transformations with a special cake. Note: This episode displays the intersection of geology, holiday magic and personal transformations.
235	26	"Volcanoes, Drive-ins and Movie Magic"	November 2, 2019
Buddy and his team take on a fascinating challenge: are creating an erupting volcano cake for a science camp. But this isn't just any volcano cake- it needs to be both spectacular and deliciously edible. To achieve this, the bakers combine culinary artistry with scientific flair. They must find ways to make the cake erupt in a safe and visually impressive manner. Perhaps they used a combination of baking soda and vinegar to create the eruption effect. Or maybe they had another tricks up their sleeves. But that's not all. In the same episode, the Cake Boss team also crafts a movie-themed cake completed with a projection screen inside. Imagine a cake that resembles a drive-in theater, where you can enjoy your favorite films while savoring a slice of cake. It is a blend of art, taste and cinematic magic.
236	27	"A Barter, a Baker and an Italian Professor"	November 9, 2019
Two tween brothers offer to trade pizza for a pony cake for their sister. Mauro's son has an Italian lesson before a semester in Rome.
237	28	"Dinosaurs, Brush Strokes and Edible Art"	February 15, 2020
The episode features two events that require artistic and impressive cakes from Buddy and his team at Carlo's Bakery. The first event is a dinosaur-themed party, where they make a realistic and huge dinosaur cake with glowing eyes and smoke effects. The second event is an art show in New York City, where they showcase a collection of cakes that look like paintings, sculptures, and other forms of art. The episode shows how Buddy and his team use different techniques and mediums to create these stunning cakes, and how they overcome challenges and have fun along the way.
238	29	"Rollercoasters, Cook-Offs and Cupcake Island"	February 15, 2020
The episode follows Buddy and his team as they create three different cakes for three different occasions. The first cake is a rollercoaster cake for a beachside amusement park in New Jersey, where Buddy used to go as a child. The cake is huge and realistic, The cake is huge and realistic, with glowing lights and smoke effects. The second cake is a blueberry cake for a cook-off at the New Jersey State Fair, where Buddy and family compete against each other to make the best recipe. The third cake is a cupcake island display for the opening of Carlo's Bakery in Dallas, where Buddy's sister Mary designed a cake inspired by the islands she and their father visited. The episode shows the challenges and fun that Buddy and his team have while making these amazing cakes.
239	30	"Waves, Watermelons and Wipe Outs"	February 22, 2020
The episode features three cakes that celebrate summer and fun. The first cake is a giant wave cake for a surfing competition at the Jersey Shore, where Buddy and his team use special effects to make the cake look realistic and impressive. The second cake is a watermelon cake for a family reunion, where Buddy and his team carve a cake that looks like a real watermelon inside. The third is a wipe out cake for a water park, where Buddy and his team create a cake that looks like a swimming pool with people falling off water slides and tubes. The episode shows Buddy and his team have fun and face challenges while making these amazing cakes.
240	31	"Thunderbirds and Butterflies"	February 29, 2020
The episode features two cakes that celebrate the sky and nature. The first cake is butterfly cake for a local zoo, where Buddy and his team create a cake that looks like a giant butterfly with colorful wings and edible flowers. The second cake is a Thunderbird cake for the 70th anniversary of the United States Air Force, where Buddy and his team make a cake that looks like a fighter jet with realistic details and smoke effects. The episode shows how Buddy and his team use different techniques and skills to create these amazing cakes, and how they honor the history and heroes of the Air Force.
241	32	"Turtle Rescue, Roller Derby and Treasure Hunt"	March 7, 2020
The episode features three cakes that celebrate different themes and events. The first cake is a sea turtle cake for a turtle-rescue organization, where Buddy and his team make a cake that looks like a realistic sea turtle with a moving head and flippers. The cake is delivered to the beach, where a real sea turtle is released back into the ocean. The second cake is a roller derby cake for a local team, where Buddy and his team create a cake that looks like a roller rink with roller skaters and a scoreboard. The cake is delivered on roller skates by Grace, who has to avoid crashing into the other roller skaters. The third cake is a treasure hunt came for a family, where Buddy and his team hide clues and surprises inside a cake that looks like a treasure chest. The cake is delivered to park, where the family has to solve the clues and find the treasure. The episode shows how Buddy and his team have fun and face challenges while making these amazing cakes.
242	33	"Sweet 16, Hulas and Tiny Hamster Cake"	March 14, 2020
Buddy's niece Tessy is celebrating her Sweet 16 with a Hawaiian-themed party. Buddy and his team create a giant hula dancer cake for the occasion. Additionally, a pet store owner requests a tiny cake fit for a hamster.
243	34	"Cuckoo Cake, Birthday Surprise and New Bakery"	March 21, 2020
Buddy and his family are in Minnesota for their new bakery opening. Meanwhile, Mauro and Madeline make a cuckoo clock cake for a collector.
244	35	"Extraterrestrials and Giant Tacos"	March 28, 2020
Buddy and his team at the bakery are busy preparing for a National Taco Day fiesta. Buddy creates a giant taco cake for the occasion. Meanwhille, they receive an order for an extraterrestrial-themed cake birthday cake.
245	36	"Giant Tooth and Masquerade Sweet 16"	April 4, 2020
Buddy and his team make a giant tooth cake for a dentist in celebration of dental hygiene month. They also create a masquerade-themed cake for a sweet 16 party.
246	37	"Next Great Bride, Fish Cake and Caesar Castano"	April 11, 2020
Buddy creates a wedding cake for Next Great Baker winner Marrisa Lopez. Ralph also makes a surprise groom's cake for her fiancé.
247	38	"Saudi Arabia and Lobster Tail Feast"	Unaired
Carlo's team take on the longest delivery they've ever received, taking a cake order to Saudi Arabia. A fight brews at home over the lobster tail, the bakery's signature pastry.
