= Clay Smothers =

American politician

Texas State Representative for former District 33-G (Dallas County)
- In office January 1977 – January 1981
- Preceded by: Richard S. Geiger
- Succeeded by: Steven D. Wolens

Personal details
- Born: April 1, 1935 Malakoff, Texas, U.S.
- Died: June 11, 2004 (aged 69)
- Party: Republican (before 1972, 1979–2004); Democratic (1972–1979)
- Spouse: Barbara Smothers
- Education: Prairie View A&M University
- Occupation: Educator Radio personality Storekeeper Operator of orphanage

Claiborne Washington "Clay" Smothers (April 1, 1935 – June 11, 2004) was an American politician and commentator. He was a member of the Texas House of Representatives from District 33-G in Dallas County from 1977 to 1981. Elected as a Conservative Democrat, Smothers switched to the Republican on December 17, 1979, near the end of the first year of the administration of Bill Clements, the first Republican governor of Texas since Reconstruction.

Smothers had been a Republican in 1970, when he unsuccessfully ran in District 12 for the Texas House; he was defeated by the Democrat Sam Coats. In that same election, George Herbert Walker Bush lost the U.S. Senate race to Democrat Lloyd Bentsen, and Republican gubernatorial nominee Paul Eggers failed to unseat Preston Smith in their second consecutive match.

== Background ==
Smothers was the fourth of five children born and reared in Malakoff in Henderson County in East Texas, where his parents, James William Smothers (1896–1975) and Alice Olenza Wingfield (1899–2000), ran the St. Paul Industrial Training School, the only African-American orphanage and school in Texas that operated without federal funds. The institution housed many homeless youth over the years. It remains operational.

Smothers graduated from the historically black Prairie View A&M University in Waller County, Texas. He and his wife, Barbara, lived for several years in Chicago, where he was a teacher and special law-enforcement officer involved in youth gang control. He served on Mayor Richard J. Daley's Commission on Youth Welfare. He and Barbara returned to Texas in 1964. He first worked in the St. Paul orphanage, but in the late 1960s moved to Dallas, where he operated a grocery store in the Oak Cliff neighborhood. He became news editor of the Dallas radio station KNOK-AM, from which he resigned while running for office. He also wrote newspaper columns highlighting Americanism and opposing what he called "extremist groups on the left and right."

== Political life ==
=== National ===
In 1972, Smothers gained national attention as an alternate delegate for then Governor George Wallace at the Democratic National Convention. Without any expectation of success, Smothers nominated himself for vice president to run with nominee George McGovern but polled support from only seventy-four delegates, more than twice that received by Governor Jimmy Carter of Georgia, the 1976 Democratic presidential nominee who was not an announced candidate for vice-president.

Smothers warned the national Democrats meeting in Miami Beach, that Wallace, who had been the victim of an assassination attempt in Maryland several weeks earlier, held the allegiance of 20 million voters and had to be recognized. Smothers did not endorse either McGovern or Republican Richard M. Nixon but instead supported the 1972 American Independent Party ticket of U.S. Representative John G. Schmitz of California and Thomas J. Anderson of Tennessee. AIP had been Wallace's party in the 1968 presidential election. Schmitz and Anderson polled more than 1 million popular votes but carried no state. The liberal author Hunter S. Thompson ridiculed Smothers as "some black Stepin Fetchit-style Wallace delegate from Texas."

=== State ===
Smothers lost the runoff election for Dallas City Council Place 8 to Lucy Patterson in 1973. The large number of Black voters at the polls are partially credited for Patterson's win, especially in South Dallas and Southeast Oak Cliff. Officials speculated that Black voters were responding to Smothers longstanding anti-busing position.

Smothers was elected to the first of his two terms in the Texas legislature in 1976, when Jimmy Carter became the last Democrat to win the electoral votes of Texas. After some four months in office, the Austin American-Statesman reported on May 20, 1977, that Smothers had been named "Freshman of the Year" of the 65th legislative session by his colleagues. However, that same year Texas Monthly magazine named him to its "Ten Worst List" of legislators.

In his first House term, Smothers spoke against ratification of the proposed Equal Rights Amendment to the United States Constitution, as well as gay rights and abortion, at a 1977 pro-family rally held in Houston in opposition to feminism. Rejecting the argument equating gay rights to civil rights, he declared, "I have had enough civil rights to choke a hungry goat! I ask for victory over the perverts in this country! I want the right to segregate my family from these misfits and perverts," Smothers told the gathering in the Astrodome.

In 1977, Smothers was one of eight House members named to the select committee on child pornography: Its Related Causes and Control. Three non-legislators were also appointed, including future Houston Mayor Bob Lanier and Margaret Formby of Hereford, the founder of the National Cowgirl Hall of Fame in Fort Worth. In his second term, Smothers served on the House Elections Committee with Tom DeLay of Sugar Land, later a high-ranking Republican member of the United States House of Representatives. He was vice chairman in that same session of the House Liquor Regulation Committee. In 1977, Smothers unsuccessfully proposed a state constitutional amendment to double the length of House terms from two to four years.

In 1978, Smothers was awarded the American Patriots Medal by the Freedoms Foundation of Valley Forge, Pennsylvania. He was selected from several thousand nominees by a panel of thirty persons, one-third of whom were justices of state supreme courts. The previous winner of the medal had been the western singer, actor, and businessman Gene Autry.

In 1979, Smothers opposed the bill to create Juneteenth as a Texas state holiday observing the end of slavery in the state. Smothers belittled the observance as mere "ceremoniously grinning and bursting watermelons on the Capitol grounds" and "a fraudulent holiday".

Smothers supported Jonas Savimbi of the National Union for the Total Independence of Angola in the Angolan Civil War in the middle 1970s and accused the Communist Cuban forces, which fought on the side of the People's Movement for the Liberation of Angola government against Savimbi, of atrocities.

In 1980, Smothers ran as a Republican on the Reagan-Bush ticket for the United States House of Representatives in Texas's 24th congressional district, but he lost to the Democratic incumbent Martin Frost. Smothers ran as an opponent of abortion and polled nearly 39 percent of the vote in the district, since reconfigured through redistricting.

== Later years ==
After his legislative service, Smothers resumed management of the St. Paul Industrial Training School in Malakoff. In January 1982, he was briefly jailed for aggravated assault after an altercation at a bait stand in Caney City near Malakoff. He told law enforcement officers that he had just returned from the Mayo Clinic in Rochester, where he had undergone surgery.

Smothers died in 2004 at the age of sixty-nine and was buried at Lincoln Memorial Park in Dallas, TX. The names of his children are unknown except for Clay, II, who died of lung cancer at the age of fifty-five in 2013; and Kinney Lee Fields, a 2016 Republican primary candidate for the District 3 seat on the Dallas County Commissioners Court.

Texas House of Representatives
Preceded by Richard S. Geiger	Texas State Representative for the former District 33-G (Dallas County); 1977–1981	Succeeded by Steven D. Wolens
