= Steven D. Wolens =

American politician

Steven Dennis Wolens

Member of the Texas House of Representatives from the 103rd district
- In office January 13, 1981 – January 11, 2005
- Preceded by: Clay Smothers
- Succeeded by: Rafael Anchía

Personal details
- Born: June 4, 1950 (age 76) Dallas, Texas, U.S.
- Party: Democratic
- Spouse: Laura Miller
- Education: Stanford University (BA); Southern Methodist University (JD)
- Occupation: Lawyer

Steven Dennis Wolens (born June 4, 1950) is an American politician and attorney in Dallas, Texas. He is a principal in the law firm McKool Smith and serves on the Texas Ethics Commission. Between 1981 and 2005, Wolens served as a state representative for District 103 in Dallas County, Texas.

== Early life and education ==
Wolens was born June 4, 1950, in Dallas and grew up in Corsicana, Texas, where his family owned the K. Wolens Department Store. He graduated from St. Mark's School of Texas in 1969. In 1973, he received his undergraduate degree from Stanford University with distinction and then earned his Juris Doctor degree from Southern Methodist University Dedman School of Law in 1976.

== Government Service ==
A Democrat, Wolens was first elected to the Texas House of Representatives in 1981 and served for 24 years. During his tenure, he authored legislation related to electricity deregulation, partnerships and limited liability corporations, and antitrust laws. From 1987 to 1992, Wolens served as Chair of the House Business and Commerce Committee. From 1997 to 2002, Wolens chaired the House State Affairs Committee. In the latter role, Texas Monthly magazine noted that Wolens "did things this session that were previously thought to be beyond the grasp of mortals. He made the Religious Right compromise on an abortion bill! He produced an electricity-deregulation bill that won the support of consumers, environmentalists, and utilities! He negotiated with the CEOs of two Fortune 500 companies over dinner and picked up the tab!"

In 2003, as chair of the House Select Committee on Ethics, he authored and passed a complete revision of Texas ethics laws. After that success, Texas Monthly commented, “At the end of the session, he passed the best ethics bill in the history of the Texas Legislature… One of the great legislators of the modern era logged another big win.”

Texas Monthly named Wolens one of the "Ten Best Legislators" in Texas on six occasions, describing him as the "House's most dreaded foe and most welcome ally."

Wolens has served on the Texas Ethics Commission since 2016, including a stint as chair.

== Controversy ==
As noted above, Wolens was a chief architect of Texas's decision to deregulate the state's electricity market. While broadly lauded in 1999, that decision led to the near collapse of the state's electrical grid in the winter of 2021. A lengthy New York Times article on the disaster quoted Wolens, who indicated that the legislation intended to spur traditional and renewable energy sources and to encourage the shuttering of old, polluting plants. On those issues, Wolens is quoted, “we were successful." As the article pointed out, Wolens's 1999 legislation was a first iteration and was intended to evolve with the needs of the state.

== Personal life ==
Wolens is married to former Dallas mayor Laura Miller. They have three children and live in Dallas.

He was a partner at the Dallas law firms of Baron & Budd and Diamond & McCarthy. He has been a principal of the Dallas firm McKool Smith since 2008. He is Jewish.

== See also ==
Texas House of Representatives
Preceded by Clay Smothers	Texas State Representative for District 33-G (since District 103 in Dallas County); 1981–2005	Succeeded by Rafael Anchia
