= E. Douglas McLeod =

American politician (born 1941)

Doug McLeod
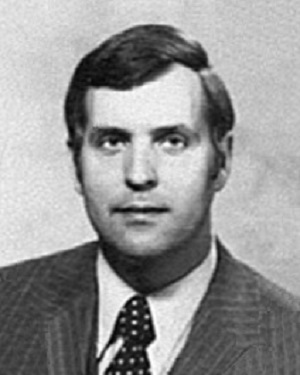
- Official portrait, 1981

Member of the Texas House of Representatives from the 19th district
- In office January 11, 1977 – January 11, 1983
- Preceded by: Ed J. Harris
- Succeeded by: James Hury

Personal details
- Born: Erle Douglas McLeod; August 6, 1941 (age 84) Galveston, Texas, U.S.
- Party: Democratic
- Spouses: Sarah Helms (m. 1965; div. 1979); Joan Williams (m. 1980)
- Education: North Texas State University (BBA); South Texas College of Law (JD); University of Houston (LLM)
- Occupation: Lawyer; businessman; politician

Military service
- Branch/service: United States Marine Corps
- Years of service: 1961‍–‍1967
- Awards: Good Conduct Medal

Erle Douglas McLeod (born August 6, 1941) is an American lawyer, businessman, civic leader, and former politician. A native of Galveston, Texas, and conservative Southern Democrat, he was first elected in 1976 to a seat representing the area in the Texas House of Representatives and won reelection in 1978 and 1980. In 1982, rather than seeking reelection, he mounted an unsuccessful party primary challenge to Jack Brooks, the incumbent member of the United States House of Representatives for Texas's 9th congressional district.

== Early life and family ==
=== Childhood and education ===
McLeod was born on August 6, 1941, at St. Mary's Hospital in Galveston, Texas. His parents, prominent trial lawyer Vaughan Watkins "Boo" McLeod (1914‍–‍1977) and Dorothy McLeod (née Milroy, later Burton; 1912‍–‍1970), were both active in the civic affairs of the city.

=== Marriages ===
On March 20, 1965, McLeod married the former Sarah Jackson "Sally" Helms in the Perkins Chapel of Southern Methodist University in Dallas.

Texas House of Representatives
Preceded by Ed J. Harris	Member of the Texas House of Representatives; 1977‍–‍1983 from the 19th district (Galveston County), seat A Served alongside: Andrew Z. Baker until 1979; Lloyd Criss from 1979	Succeeded by James Hury
