= Earl Abel's =

Restaurant in San Antonio, Texas

Coordinates: 29.4416668°N 98.4777710°W

- Interactive map of Earl Abel's

Restaurant information
- Location: Texas, United States

Earl Abel's is a popular restaurant in San Antonio, Texas that opened in 1933 and existed at one location at Broadway and Hildebrand from 1940 until 2006. It has been popular for its diverse menu ranging from Fried Chicken and Rainbow Trout to its selection of desserts including German chocolate cake and lemon meringue pie; its clientele included the well-to-do from nearby Alamo Heights, businessmen and politicians including Congressman Henry B. Gonzalez who got in a fist fight at the restaurant in 1986 with a fellow customer who called him a communist, as well as many U.S. Army personnel stationed at nearby Fort Sam Houston.

== History ==
After founding a chain of restaurants in San Antonio in 1933, Earl Abel decided to close most of his restaurants due to labor shortages during World War II, leaving the remaining location at the corner of Broadway and Hildebrand Avenue as a landmark on a portion of the city's inner northside, now the city's Midtown District. One of the things that distinguished the restaurant was the series of signs above the lunch counter that read "Eating here keeps Earl Able," "It was a brave man who ate the first oyster," "Seeville dardaygo tousandbuses inarow. Nojodemtrux, summitcows ansummitdux," and "Eat here and diet home."

The end came for the restaurant's long-time Broadway location in 2005 when Earl's son, Jerry, decided to sell the property to Koontz McCombs, a San Antonio development firm, so it could build high-rise condominiums.

Jerry Abel was quoted in the San Antonio Express-News regarding the restaurant property's sale saying that everything just came together perfectly; the building was old and he did not wish to continue running the restaurant in his old age, so he sold out. The original restaurant closed its doors for good in March 2006.

In late 2006, Earl Abel's re-opened under new ownership at a new San Antonio location on Austin Highway at Seidel Road. The restaurant still has the same menu, although much of the staff is different.

Due to development of the Austin Highway area starting in 2011, a search began for a new location. Due in part to the fortuitous closing of another restaurant, the decision was made in the summer of 2017 to go back "home" to Broadway. In December 2017, Earl Abel's opened at its new location near the Pearl Brewery.
