= Lucy Patterson =

American politician

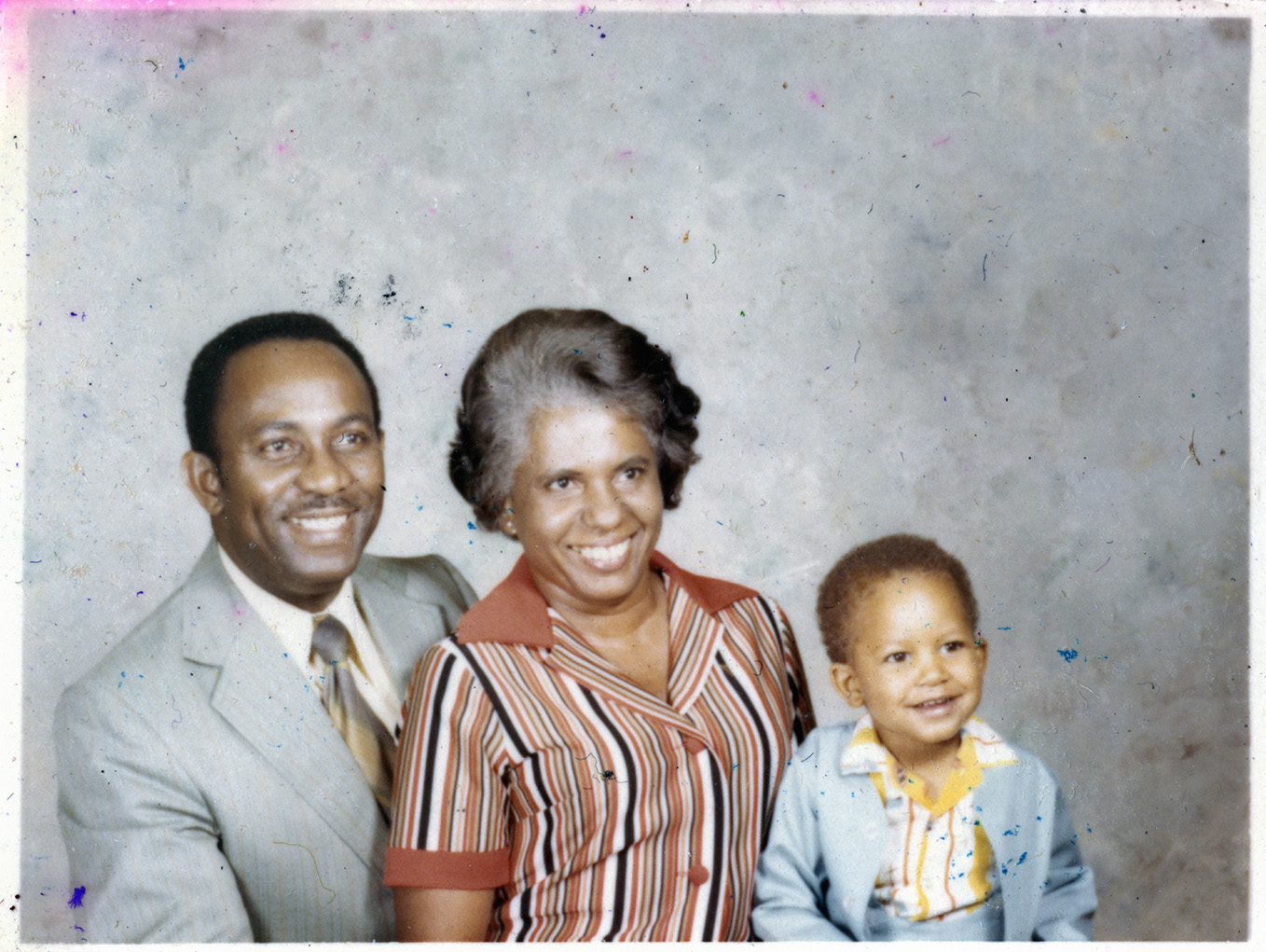
- Patterson with husband Albert and son Albert Harley

Member of Dallas City Council
- In office 1973–1980
- Preceded by: George L. Allen
- Succeeded by: Fred Blair
- Constituency: Place 8

Personal details
- Born: Lucy Pearl Phelps; June 21, 1931 Dallas, Texas, U.S.
- Died: June 15, 2000 (aged 68) Dallas, Texas
- Education: Howard University (BA); University of Denver (MSW)

Lucy Patterson was the first African American woman elected to the Dallas City Council. Patterson was a social worker, politician, and professor.

== Family life and education ==
Lucy Pearl Phelps was born in Dallas, Texas, on June 21, 1931, to John C. and Florence Harllee Phelps. She had one sister, Norma. Her maternal grandfather Norman Washington Harllee served as the principal for the Dallas Colored High School for eleven years and was the first African American man to have a school named after him in 1929. Her mother was a social worker for the Dallas Independent School District and was the first African American faculty member of the Graduate School of Social Work for the University of Texas at Arlington. Patterson attended Booker T. Washington High School from 1942 to 1945, graduating at 14 years old. Although accepted to Howard University, she attended Wiley College Extension until she was 15 and was allowed to enroll at Howard. Patterson was a member of the Alpha Kappa Alpha sorority. She received a Bachelor's in Sociology and Psychology in 1950. She would later take two years off from her professional career to earn a Master's in Social Work from the University of Denver in 1963. On November 25, 1950, she married Albert S. Patterson of Trinidad, West Indies, also a Howard University student, and they moved to Dallas in 1954. Lucy Patterson and her husband had one son, Albert Harllee Patterson, born August 26, 1969, and two foster children, John Austin Joseph and Charlotte Anne Joseph. Patterson died in Dallas on June 15, 2000, and is buried at the Lincoln Memorial Cemetery in Dallas.

== Political career ==
Lucy Patterson won Place 8 of the Dallas City Council in 1973. She ran as a Democrat against Judy Lott, an Independent African American school teacher, Clay Smothers, a conservative Republican African American newspaper columnist, and Jasper Baccus, an Independent African American businessman. Patterson was the first African American woman endorsed by the Citizen Charter Association (CCA), a council-manager system started in 1930 for improving city governments. Patterson was also endorsed by the political task force Women for Change, Inc., because she committed to "the involvement of more women in management and supervisory positions in the city government, including their appointment to boards and commissions".

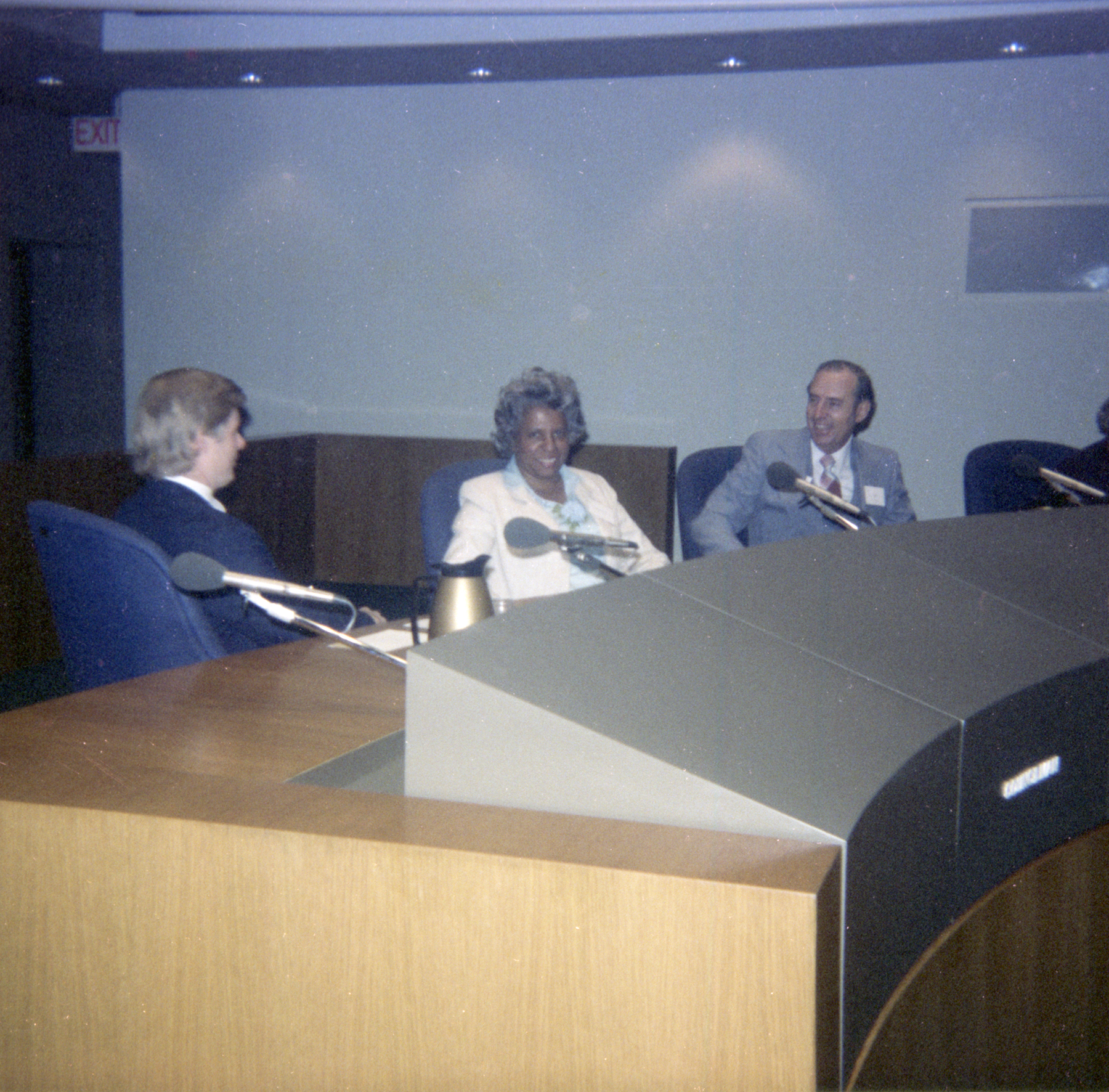
Patterson, possibly during a Dallas City Council Meeting, undated [ca. 1973–1980]

The original election was April 4, 1973, with Patterson winning 21,733 votes, Smothers 13,788, Baccus 4,557, and Lott 4,404. None of the candidates reached the required majority (Patterson was the closest with 48% of the vote), causing a subsequent runoff election. There was speculation that a runoff would have been unnecessary had the election been held on a single-member district basis, with Patterson receiving close to 60% of the vote compared to Smothers 10.4%. Patterson's political focus included pursuing single-member districts, ensuring quality of life for citizens, supporting school busing, decentralizing the police force, and developing transportation opportunities.

The runoff election between Patterson and Smothers was held on April 18, 1973. Political officials predicted that Smothers would win the spot because of his conservative views and popularity with conservative voters. Towards the end of the campaign, Smothers publicly claimed that Patterson "supported the hanging of Angela Davis' picture in public schools". Patterson won 15,051 votes and Smothers won 13,367, a close race evidenced in the difference of votes from varying precincts. The large number of Black voters at the polls are partially credited for Patterson's win, especially in South Dallas and Southeast Oak Cliff. Officials also speculated that Black voters were responding to Smothers longstanding anti-busing position.

After her election, Patterson was appointed as an assistant professor at the North Texas State University. The Texas Constitution states that elected officials are barred from drawing a salary for their public service while also employed by a state institution, and an amendment passed in 1972 clarifies that state employees are not barred from serving as members of governing bodies as long as they do not receive a salary. Patterson agreed to serve the rest of her term without receiving the weekly $50 pay, rejecting offers from the Pylon Salesmanship Club, an African American businessmen's organization, and other council members to pay her weekly salary. She served as a member of the city council for free rather than resigning the position.

Patterson ran for a second term in 1975 against Dan Thomas, a CCA advisor to mayoral candidate John Schoellkopf and a precinct chairman for Progressive Voters League, who filed three hours before the deadline. Patterson was endorsed by the CCA for a second term. She was also endorsed by the Dallas League of Conservation Voters, based on her record on key votes, answers to questionnaires, interviews, public statements, campaign platform and background, and the Neighborhood Conservation Alliance, based on her support for neighborhood quality, improvement, and equal distribution of plan commission members. Patterson won Place 8 with 4,184 votes to Thomas' 505. Patterson was the greatest percentage winner of all contested Dallas city council races, drawing 89.2% of the votes cast.

Patterson announced she would not seek a fourth term on the city council on January 12, 1979. This announcement came on the same day as Patterson losing a nomination 6–5 for the Dallas/Fort Worth Airport board to Bill Nicol.

Patterson served as the acting chair for the child advocacy community, advocating for accessible childcare facilities and specific guidelines for those facilities. Her ideas included 24-hour childcare facility for the Oak Cliff area, turning park recreation centers into daycare facilities for school children, and city-operated care centers paid for city officials. Patterson also served on the finance and inner-city committees. Patterson championed a program to find jobs for low-income youths in Dallas to keep them from dropping out of school.

During her second term, Patterson received a letter from Dallas Police Association President Lt. C.T. Burnley naming her the "policeman's adversary" after she expressed concern that the operating budget cut funds to police social service counseling programs while maintaining full funding of a 100-member tactical squad. Burnley charged that Patterson's remarks were inflammatory and incorrect. Several people requested that the city council investigate Burnley for insubordination in the public statement because city council members had to address all issues with police officers through the chain of command, beginning with the city manager's office. The DPA voted 158–16 in support of Burnley's comments and pledged to walk out on the job if he was suspended for his remarks. Burnley was cleared and no further action was taken. Patterson never publicly responded to the letter.

Patterson advocated for fair housing practices on the basis of sex and race. When conversations about white flight began in late 1973, city officials suggested that real estate agents, home builders, and lending agencies were not implementing open housing policies and created a panic around non-white families moving into the area. Dallas City Council suggested that neighborhood groups instilling pride in neighborhood residences would fix the issue and allow for successful integration. Patterson advocated that neighborhood coalitions sponsored by the city as opposed to grassroots neighborhood coalitions would promote resistance to integration rather than stabilization. Patterson also called for the resignation of City Plan Commissioner Harvey Huie when he was accused and found guilty of race-based housing discrimination after refusing to rent an Oak Lawn apartment to a Black woman, but Huie was allowed to continue serving through his appeal process.

Listed among her legislative accomplishments are the installation of sidewalks in Oak Cliff, revisions to strengthen Dallas's Fair Housing Ordinance, purposing a contract compliance ordinance requiring the hiring of minorities by contractors doing business with the city, the appointment of minorities to city boards and commissions, and an affirmative action plan.

In 1979, President Jimmy Carter appointed Mrs. Patterson to the White House Committee on Hospital Cost Containment.

Patterson ran for Congress from the 24th Congressional District in 1982, challenging Martin Frost. Patterson had previously endorsed Frost and served on his steering committee. She was discouraged by the Democratic Party from challenging Congressman Frost, as well as by the state's court-ordered redistricting map, so Patterson switched parties to run against him. She lost with only 26% of the vote.

In 1985, Patterson was appointed to the National Afro-American History and Cultural Commission by President Ronald Reagan.

== Community involvement ==
Patterson was a caseworker for the Dallas County Department of Public Welfare for fifteen years. In 1963 she was promoted to supervisor of casework services. In 1968, she was the first African American woman to serve as Director of the Inter-Agency Project of the Community Council of Greater Dallas, heading the work done to coordinate resources in the Crossroads Community Center. In the position, she had eight staff members, two professional social workers, two intake workers, one coordinate aid, and three clerical workers.

Patterson was appointed an assistant professor at the North Texas State University in 1973. She left NTSU in 1978 when she was appointed to the Ethel Carter Branham Endowed Chair in Social Work to build a Social Work and Criminal Justice program at Bishop College.

Patterson was awarded the Woman of the Year Award from the Zeta Phi Beta sorority for being the first African American woman elected to the Dallas City Council, for her civic devotion for community involvement, and for seeking a second term on the council without receiving pay.

Patterson was a board member of the Mental Health Association of Dallas County.

Patterson was a part of the Altrusa Club of Dallas, National League of Cities, and Texas Municipal League.

Patterson was the executive director of the County Child Care Council.

She was the Director of the Dallas County Childcare Center.

Patterson was a part of the Women's Council of Dallas County which provided scholarships to students pursuing careers in human services.

In 1971, Patterson was made co-chair of the Crossroads Community Center.

In 1975, Patterson was named Social Worker of the Year by the National Association of Social Workers for both her professional contributions and leadership and service to the community.

She was active in the Dallas County Department of Public Welfare, Dallas County Community Action Committee, League of Women Voters, and Planned Parenthood of Dallas.

Patterson received an award from Women's Council of Dallas County for scholarship and community service.

Patterson received an award from the Dallas Negro Chamber of Commerce.
