= 1982 United States House of Representatives elections in Texas =

- November 2, 1982

All 27 Texas seats to the United States House of Representatives
	Majority party	Minority party
Party	Democratic	Republican
Last election	19	5
Seats won	22	5
Seat change	▲3	Steady
Popular vote	1,847,045	934,863
Percentage	64.8%	32.8%
Swing	▲5.7%	▼6.7%
Democratic
50–60%
60–70%
70–80%
80–90%
90>%
Republican
50–60%
70–80%
80–90%
90>%

The 1982 United States House of Representatives elections in Texas occurred on November 2, 1982, to elect the members of the state of Texas's delegation to the United States House of Representatives. Texas had twenty-seven seats in the House, up three from the 1970s, apportioned according to the 1980 United States census.

Due to the Texas' divided government, considerable challenge was foreseen in the state's decennial redistricting process. The process attracted the attention of many prominent members of the U.S. House. The Texas Legislature failed to adopt new congressional districts during the regular legislative session in 1981 due to conflict between liberal and conservative Texas Democrats. During a special session in 1981, conservative Democrats voted with Republicans on a plan supported by Republican governor Bill Clements. Most contentious during this session was the transfer of African-American voting precincts from District 5 to District 24 in the Dallas area. Though Republicans supported the establishment of the minority opportunity district, it was seen by many Democrats as a tactical political move to increase the Republican lean of the 5th District.

The adopted congressional districts were challenged by the U.S. Department of Justice in a District Court in Upham v. Seamon. Under preclearance established by Section 5 of the Voting Rights Act of 1965, they asserted that the boundaries of District 15 and District 27 were racially gerrymandered. The court ruled in favor of the Department of Justice, and it drew its own map, which established two districts in Dallas County where African-Americans made up a substantial proportion of the voting-age population. The case was appealed to the Supreme Court, and it remanded the case back to the District Court, but the ruling was made so close to the May primary election that the District Court's maps were allowed to stand for the 1982 elections.

These elections occurred simultaneously with the United States Senate elections of 1982, the United States House elections in other states, and various state and local elections.

Although Republicans were expected to gain seats in Texas's congressional delegation, Democrats maintained their majority of seats, winning all three of the new seats Texas gained in the 1980 United States census.

== Overview ==
1982 United States House of Representatives elections in Texas
Party	Votes	Percentage	Seats before	Seats after	+/–
Democratic	1,847,045	64.83%	19	22	+3
Republican	934,863	32.81%	5	5	-
Libertarian	57,998	2.04%	0	0	-
Citizens	5,933	0.21%	0	0	-
Independent	3,192	0.11%	0	0	-
Totals		100.00%	24	27	-

== Congressional districts ==
=== District 1 ===
Incumbent Democrat Sam B. Hall ran for re-election.

Texas's 1st congressional district, 1982
Party	Candidate	Votes	%
Democratic	Sam B. Hall (incumbent)	100,685	97.48
Libertarian	John Traylor	2,598	2.52
Total votes		103,283	100
Democratic hold			

=== District 2 ===
Incumbent Democrat Charlie Wilson ran for re-election.

Texas's 2nd congressional district, 1982
Party	Candidate	Votes	%
Democratic	Charlie Wilson (incumbent)	91,762	94.26
Libertarian	Ed Richbourg	5,584	5.74
Total votes		97,346	100
Democratic hold			

=== District 3 ===
Incumbent Republican James M. Collins retired to run for U.S. Senator.

Texas's 3rd congressional district, 1982
Party	Candidate	Votes	%
Republican	Steve Bartlett	99,852	77.09
Democratic	Jim McNees	28,223	21.79
Libertarian	Jerry Williamson	1,453	1.12
Total votes		129,528	100
Republican hold			

=== District 4 ===
Incumbent Democrat Ralph Hall ran for re-election.

Texas's 4th congressional district, 1982
Party	Candidate	Votes	%
Democratic	Ralph Hall (incumbent)	94,134	73.83
Republican	Pete Collumb	32,221	25.27
Libertarian	Bruce Iiams	1,141	0.89
Total votes		127,496	100
Democratic hold			

=== District 5 ===
Incumbent Democrat Jim Mattox retired to run for Attorney General.

Texas's 5th congressional district, 1982
Party	Candidate	Votes	%
Democratic	John Wiley Bryant	52,214	64.84
Republican	Joe Devany	27,121	33.68
Libertarian	Richard Squire	732	0.91
Citizens	John Richard Bridges	459	0.57
Write-in	Others	4	0.00
Total votes		80,530	100
Democratic hold			

=== District 6 ===
Incumbent Democrat Phil Gramm ran for re-election.

Texas's 6th congressional district, 1982
Party	Candidate	Votes	%
Democratic	Phil Gramm (incumbent)	91,546	94.54
Libertarian	Ron Hard	5,288	5.46
Total votes		96,834	100
Democratic hold			

=== District 7 ===
Incumbent Republican Bill Archer ran for re-election.

Texas's 7th congressional district, 1982
Party	Candidate	Votes	%
Republican	Bill Archer (incumbent)	108,718	84.99
Democratic	Dennis Scoggins	17,866	13.97
Libertarian	Bill Ware	1,338	1.05
Total votes		127,922	100
Republican hold			

=== District 8 ===
Incumbent Republican Jack Fields ran for re-election.

Texas's 8th congressional district, 1982
Party	Candidate	Votes	%
Republican	Jack Fields (incumbent)	50,630	56.75
Democratic	Henry Allee	38,041	42.64
Libertarian	Mike Angwin	547	0.61
Total votes		89,218	100
Republican hold			

=== District 9 ===
Incumbent Democrat Jack Brooks ran for re-election.

Texas's 9th congressional district, 1982
Party	Candidate	Votes	%
Democratic	Jack Brooks (incumbent)	78,965	67.55
Republican	John Lewis	35,422	30.30
Libertarian	Dean Allen	2,510	2.15
Total votes		116,897	100
Democratic hold			

=== District 10 ===
Incumbent Democrat J. J. Pickle ran for re-election.

Texas's 10th congressional district, 1982
Party	Candidate	Votes	%
Democratic	J. J. Pickle (incumbent)	121,030	90.14
Libertarian	William Kelsey	8,735	6.51
Citizens	Bradley Louis Rockwell	4,511	3.36
Total votes		134,276	100
Democratic hold			

=== District 11 ===
Incumbent Democrat Marvin Leath ran for re-election.

Texas's 11th congressional district, 1982
Party	Candidate	Votes	%
Democratic	Marvin Leath (incumbent)	83,236	96.34
Libertarian	Thomas Kilbride	3,136	3.63
Write-in	Others	23	0.03
Total votes		86,395	100
Democratic hold			

=== District 12 ===
Incumbent Democrat Jim Wright ran for re-election.

Texas's 12th congressional district, 1982
Party	Candidate	Votes	%
Democratic	Jim Wright (incumbent)	78,913	68.90
Republican	Jim Ryan	34,879	30.45
Libertarian	Edward Olson	743	0.65
Total votes		114,535	100
Democratic hold			

=== District 13 ===
Incumbent Democrat Jack Hightower ran for re-election.

Texas's 13th congressional district, 1982
Party	Candidate	Votes	%
Democratic	Jack Hightower (incumbent)	86,376	63.60
Republican	Ron Solver	47,877	35.25
Libertarian	Rod Collier	1,567	1.15
Total votes		135,820	100
Democratic hold			

=== District 14 ===
Incumbent Democrat Bill Patman ran for re-election. Former representative Joseph Wyatt, who retired in 1980, challenged Patman, having switched his party affiliation from the Democratic Party to the Republican Party.

Texas's 14th congressional district, 1982
Party	Candidate	Votes	%
Democratic	Bill Patman (incumbent)	76,851	60.65
Republican	Joseph Wyatt	48,942	38.62
Libertarian	Glenn Rasmussen	919	0.73
Total votes		126,712	100
Democratic hold			

=== District 15 ===
Incumbent Democrat Kika de la Garza ran for re-election.

Texas's 15th congressional district, 1982
Party	Candidate	Votes	%
Democratic	Kika de la Garza (incumbent)	76,544	95.68
Libertarian	Frank Jones	3,458	4.32
Total votes		80,002	100
Democratic hold			

=== District 16 ===
Incumbent Democrat Richard Crawford White opted to retire rather than run for re-election.

Texas's 16th congressional district, 1982
Party	Candidate	Votes	%
Democratic	Ronald D. Coleman	44,024	53.90
Republican	Pat Haggerty	36,064	44.16
Libertarian	Catherine McDivitt	1,583	1.94
Total votes		81,671	100
Democratic hold			

=== District 17 ===
Incumbent Democrat Charles Stenholm ran for re-election.

Texas's 17th congressional district, 1982
Party	Candidate	Votes	%
Democratic	Charles Stenholm (incumbent)	109,359	97.10
Libertarian	James Cooley	3,271	2.90
Total votes		112,630	100
Democratic hold			

=== District 18 ===
Incumbent Democrat Mickey Leland ran for re-election.

Texas's 18th congressional district, 1982
Party	Candidate	Votes	%
Democratic	Mickey Leland (incumbent)	68,014	82.61
Republican	C. Leon Pickett	12,104	14.70
Libertarian	Thomas Bernhardt	2,215	2.69
Write-in	Others	2	0.00
Total votes		82,335	100
Democratic hold			

=== District 19 ===
Incumbent Democrat Kent Hance ran for re-election.

Texas's 19th congressional district, 1982
Party	Candidate	Votes	%
Democratic	Kent Hance (incumbent)	89,702	81.57
Republican	E. L. Hicks	19,062	17.33
Libertarian	Mike Read	1,206	1.10
Total votes		109,970	100
Democratic hold			

=== District 20 ===
Incumbent Democrat Henry B. González ran for re-election.

Texas's 20th congressional district, 1982
Party	Candidate	Votes	%
Democratic	Henry B. Gonzalez (incumbent)	68,544	91.48
Libertarian	Roger Gary	4,163	5.56
Independent	Benedict La Rosa	2,213	2.95
Write-in	Others	4	0.01
Total votes		74,924	100
Democratic hold			

=== District 21 ===
Incumbent Republican Tom Loeffler ran for re-election.

Texas's 21st congressional district, 1982
Party	Candidate	Votes	%
Republican	Tom Loeffler (incumbent)	106,515	74.55
Democratic	Charles Stough	35,112	24.58
Libertarian	Jeffrey Brown	1,243	0.87
Write-in	Others	2	0.00
Total votes		142,872	100
Republican hold			

=== District 22 ===
Incumbent Republican Ron Paul ran for re-election.

Texas's 22nd congressional district, 1982
Party	Candidate	Votes	%
Republican	Ron Paul (incumbent)	66,536	98.60
Write-in	Nick Benton	943	1.40
Total votes		67,479	100
Republican hold			

=== District 23 ===
Incumbent Democrat Abraham Kazen ran for re-election.

Texas's 23rd congressional district, 1982
Party	Candidate	Votes	%
Democratic	Abraham Kazen (incumbent)	51,690	55.27
Republican	Jeff Wentworth	41,363	44.23
Libertarian	Parker Abell	475	0.51
Total votes		93,528	100
Democratic hold			

=== District 24 ===
Incumbent Democrat Martin Frost ran for re-election. Under the legislature's initial redistricting plan, this district was slated to become a minority-majority district. Democratic former Dallas city councilwoman Lucy Patterson, an African-American woman, had announced her intention to challenge Frost in the Democratic primary. After the district's boundaries were changed by federal courts to return the district to having a majority-white population, Patterson switched parties and ran in the general election as a Republican.

Texas's 24th congressional district, 1982
Party	Candidate	Votes	%
Democratic	Martin Frost (incumbent)	63,857	72.85
Republican	Lucy Patterson	22,798	26.01
Libertarian	David Guier	998	1.14
Total votes		87,653	100
Democratic hold			

=== District 25 ===
District 25 was created as a result of redistricting after the 1980 census. The district was located in southern Harris County.

Texas's 25th congressional district, 1982
Party	Candidate	Votes	%
Democratic	Michael A. Andrews	63,974	60.40
Republican	Mike Faubion	40,112	37.87
Citizens	Barbara Coldiron	963	0.91
Libertarian	Jeff Calvert	864	0.82
Write-in	Others	1	0.00
Total votes		105,914	100
Democratic win (new seat)			

=== District 26 ===
District 26 was created as a result of redistricting after the 1980 census. Both political parties heavily lobbied former Arlington mayor Tom Vandergriff to run for the seat on their respective tickets. Vandergriff eventually chose to run as a Democrat. The district's lines had been drawn to favor Republicans; it would have given Ronald Reagan 67 percent of the vote had it existed in 1980.

Texas's 26th congressional district, 1982
Party	Candidate	Votes	%
Democratic	Tom Vandergriff	69,782	50.12
Republican	Jim Bradshaw	69,438	49.88
Total votes		139,220	100
Democratic win (new seat)			

=== District 27 ===
District 27 was created as a result of redistricting after the 1980 census. The district was located in South Texas and was 53 percent Hispanic while the neighboring 15th District was 80 percent Hispanic in the plan passed by the Texas Legislature. The U.S. Department of Justice successfully argued that this was a racial gerrymander that diluted Hispanic voting power, and a District Court redrew the districts to more equally reflect Hispanic voting strength in the region.

Texas's 27th congressional district, 1982
Party	Candidate	Votes	%
Democratic	Solomon Ortiz	66,604	64.02
Republican	Jason Luby	35,209	33.84
Libertarian	Steven Roberts	2,231	2.14
Total votes		104,044	100
Democratic win (new seat)			
