= Taco Day =

Unofficial observance

The Taco Day is a celebratory day that promotes consumption of Mexican tacos.

== In Mexico ==
March 31 – Day of the Taco – Día del Taco – International Taco Day – Día Internacional del Taco created in 2007 by Televisa

In Mexico the Día del Taco is celebrated on March 31.

== In the United States ==
In the United States National Taco Day is celebrated on the first Tuesday in October.

May 3 – On April 30, 1968, Congress Member Henry B. González gave a speech on the floor of Congress in which he quoted the National Taco Week Council of San Antonio, Texas, as saying: "On May 3rd of every year National Taco Day will be observed in honor of the birth date of the great Texan and American, the Honorable Henry B. Gonzalez, Congressman of Bexar County and San Antonio." There is no indication that Congress took any further action.

Second Tuesday in October – Up for debate. The move is part of a larger campaign to liberate "Taco Tuesday" after Taco Bell challenged the trademark held since 1979 in 49 states by Taco John's (Gregory’s Restaurant & Bar in Somers Point, NJ, held the exclusive trademark for the state of New Jersey through 2023). By officially moving National Taco Day to a Tuesday, organizers aim to create an unforgettable taco celebration for fans and restaurant owners alike.

== In France ==
In France, "Tacos Day" is July 31, however French tacos are very different from their Mexican counterpart. French tacos reportedly originated in the suburbs of Lyon.

== Other ==
The term "National Taco Day" does not reference any country or correspond to any country's National Taco Day. This holiday was created as part of a 2009 advertisement campaign by the taco chain Del Taco.

== See also ==
- List of food days
- Taco Tuesday
