= Rafael Anchía =

American politician (born 1968)

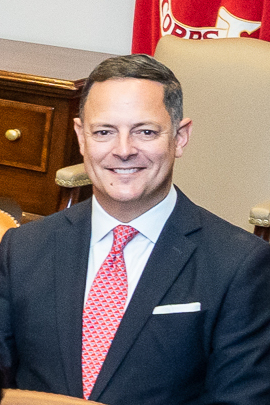
- Anchía in 2021

Member of the Texas House of Representatives from the 103rd district
- Incumbent
- Assumed office January 11, 2005
- Preceded by: Steven D. Wolens

Personal details
- Born: September 26, 1968 (age 58) Miami, Florida, U.S.
- Party: Democratic
- Spouse(s): Marissa Anchía (m. 1997; div. 2014) Rebecca Acuña (m. 2023)
- Children: 2
- Education: Southern Methodist University (BA); Tulane University (JD)
- Website: Office website Campaign website

Rafael Michael Anchía (born September 26, 1968) is an American politician and a Democratic member of the Texas House of Representatives for the Dallas-based 103rd District since 2005. He is also an attorney with the law firm Haynes & Boone LLP and co-founder and managing director of Civitas Capital Group. He had previously served on the board of the Dallas Independent School District.

Anchía sits on the board of the interest group Education Is Freedom. He is also a member of the Texas State Democratic Executive Committee.

== Texas House of Representatives ==
Anchía was elected to the Texas House in 2004 and sworn into the freshman class of the 79th Texas Legislature on January 11, 2005. The district Anchía represents is fully encompassed within Dallas County, Texas, and includes North Oak Cliff, Oak Lawn, portions of West Dallas, the Medical District, Love Field Airport, North and Arlington Parks, Irving, and Farmers Branch. As of 2015, he was 35th in seniority out of the 150 members of the Texas House.

Anchía is the Chairman of the House Committee on Pensions, Investments, and Financial Services.

In previous sessions, Anchía was vice-chair of the Pensions, Investments and Financial Services Committee and sat on the Economic Development, Elections, Financial Institutions, Land & Resource Management, Local & Consent Calendar, and Urban Affairs Committees.

Anchía is a supporter of "New Urbanism" and using both fossil fuels and renewable energy.

== Personal life ==
Rafael was married to Marissa from 14 June 1997 until their divorce in 2014. The marriage produced two children. He married Rebecca Acuña in 2023.
