= Henry B. González =

American politician (1916–2000)

Henry González
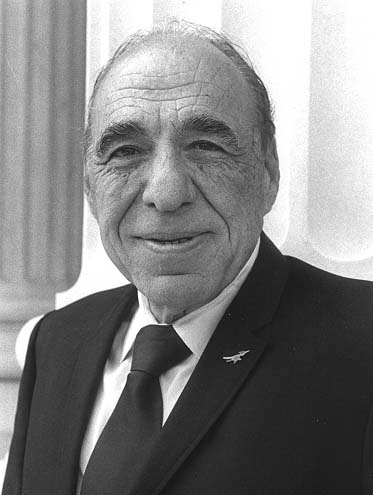

Ranking Member of the House Financial Services Committee
- In office January 3, 1995 – January 3, 1999
- Preceded by: Jim Leach
- Succeeded by: John LaFalce

Chair of the House Financial Services Committee
- In office January 3, 1989 – January 3, 1995
- Preceded by: Fernand St. Germain
- Succeeded by: Jim Leach

Member of the U.S. House of Representatives from Texas's 20th district
- In office November 4, 1961 – January 3, 1999
- Preceded by: Paul J. Kilday
- Succeeded by: Charlie Gonzalez

Personal details
- Born: Enrique Barbosa González; May 3, 1916 San Antonio, Texas, U.S.
- Died: November 28, 2000 (aged 84) San Antonio, Texas, U.S.
- Party: Democratic
- Spouse: Bertha Cuellar (m. 1940)
- Children: 8, including Charlie
- Education: San Antonio College (attended); University of Texas, Austin (BA); St. Mary's University, Texas (JD)

Henry Barbosa González (born Enrique Barbosa González; May 3, 1916 – November 28, 2000) was an American Democratic politician from Texas who represented Texas's 20th congressional district from 1961 to 1999. He is the longest-serving Hispanic in Congress and a founding member of the Congressional Hispanic Caucus.

== Early life ==
González was born in San Antonio, Texas, the son of Mexican-born parents Genoveva (née Barbosa) and Leonides González (from Mapimí, Durango), who had immigrated during the Mexican Revolution. After he received an associate degree from San Antonio College, he earned his undergraduate degree from the University of Texas at Austin. Later, he received a Juris Doctor from St. Mary's University School of Law, also in San Antonio. Upon graduation, he became a probation officer, and was quickly promoted to the chief office of Bexar County, Texas. In 1945, he quit after a judge refused to allow him to add an African-American probation officer to his staff. In 1950, he was scoutmaster of Troop 90 in San Antonio, of which his son was also a member.

== Career in local and state politics ==
González served on the San Antonio City Council from 1953 to 1956. As a city council member, González helped desegregate swimming pools and other public accommodations in San Antonio.

In 1956, González defeated Republican candidate Jesse Oppenheimer for a seat in the Texas Senate. In 1960 he defeated another Republican, Ika "Ike" Simpson Kampmann, Jr. (1918-2006), to hold his state Senate seat. He remained in the Senate until 1961 and set the filibuster record in the chamber at the time (Note: The record was surpassed in 1977 by Senator Bill Meier of Tarrant County who spoke for 43 hours.) by speaking for 36 hours straight with the help of fellow state senator Abraham Kazen against a set of bills on segregation. Most of the bills were abandoned (eight out of ten).

He ran for governor in 1958 and finished second in the Democratic primary (the real contest for governor in what was then a solidly Democratic state) to Price Daniel. In May 1961, González ran in the special election for the Senate seat that Lyndon B. Johnson vacated to become U.S. Vice President. He finished in sixth place in part because he split the liberal and Hispanic vote with Maury Maverick, Jr., of San Antonio.

== House of Representatives ==
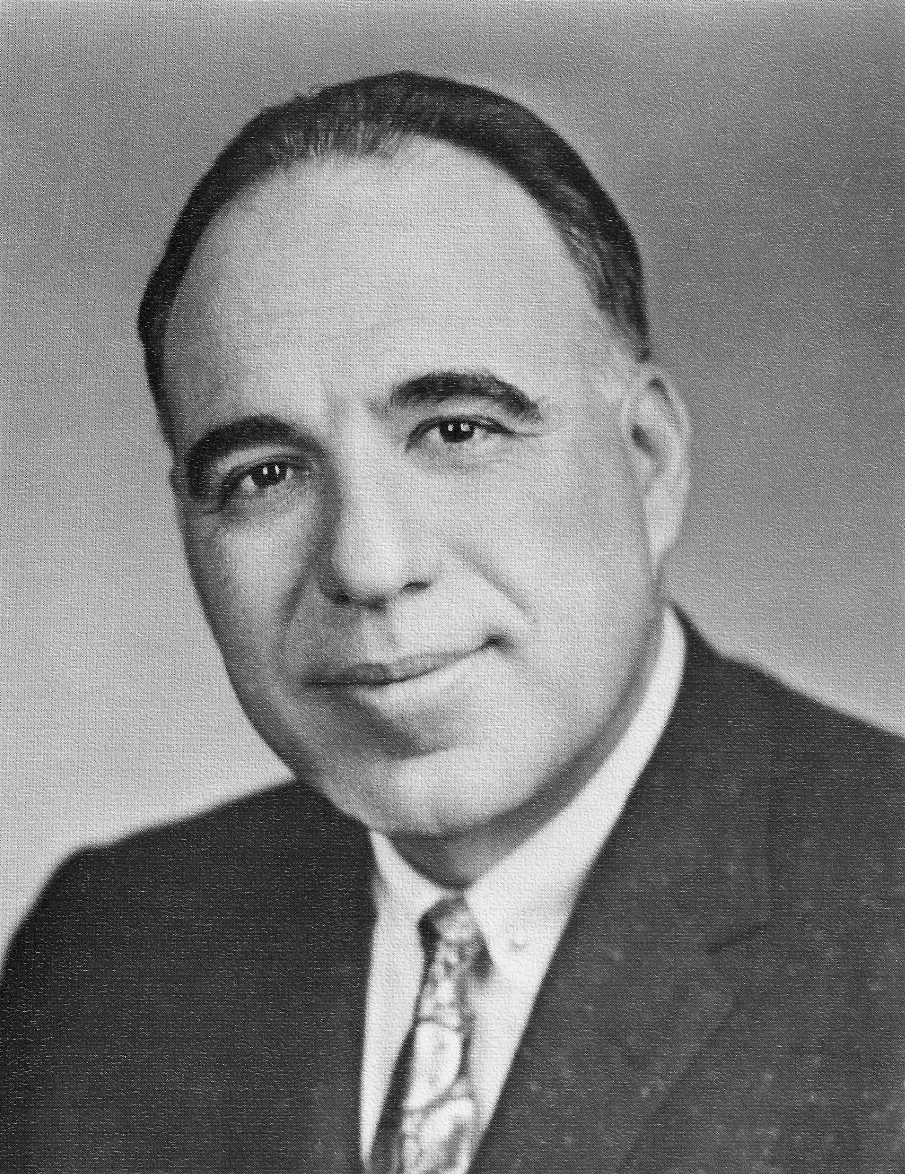
González's official Congressional portrait c. 1972

In September 1961 President Kennedy appointed Rep. Paul J. Kilday of Texas's 20th congressional district to the Court of Military Appeals. González entered the special election for the San Antonio-based district in November 1961 and defeated a strong Republican candidate, attorney John W. Goode, whom former U.S. President Dwight D. Eisenhower flew to San Antonio to endorse. Mexican film star Cantinflas appeared with Vice President Johnson at shopping centers and supermarkets in San Antonio to support González, who would never face another contest nearly that close. He was unopposed for a full term in 1962 and was reelected seventeen times thereafter. He never faced truly serious or well-funded opposition, having been unopposed in 1970, 1974, 1976, 1978, 1982, and 1984. In fact, the 20th district was (and remains) so heavily Democratic that González faced Republican opposition only five times and handily prevailed whenever challenged.

González became known for his staunchly liberal views. In 1963, Republican U.S. Representative Ed Foreman called González "a communist" and "a pinko" and González confronted him. González was again referred to as "a communist" in 1986 by a man at Earl Abel's restaurant, a popular San Antonio eatery. The 70-year-old representative responded by punching him in the face. González was acquitted of assault for this incident when the restaurant patron dropped the charge.

Unlike many southern politicians at the time, González vocally supported civil rights proposals. He voted in favor of the Civil Rights Acts of 1964 and 1968, and the Voting Rights Act of 1965.

González was in President Kennedy's fateful motorcade through Dallas on November 22, 1963. He recalled rolling down the window as his car neared the Texas School Book Depository, then hearing three distinct shots during the assassination. González's car proceeded to Parkland Memorial Hospital where, upon seeing a blood-soaked bouquet of roses in the rear of the presidential limousine, he initially believed Jackie Kennedy had been shot. There, he saw Lyndon Johnson, Lady Bird Johnson, Mrs. Kennedy, and President Kennedy's sheet covered body. González helped place Kennedy's casket in the hearse that transported Kennedy to Air Force One.

Reported to be unsettled by the effect that the assassinations of John F. Kennedy, Robert F. Kennedy, and Martin Luther King Jr. had on the nation, González pushed in 1975 for a House committee study. In 1976 the United States House Select Committee on Assassinations (HSCA) was created to investigate the deaths of President Kennedy and King, and González succeeded Thomas N. Downing as its chairman in January 1977. After a power struggle with the HSCA's counsel, he resigned as the committee's chairman that same year. Shortly before González chaired the HSCA, Robert P. Gemberling, head of the FBI's investigation of the Kennedy assassination for thirteen years after the release of the Warren Commission's report, said González, as well as Downing, had "preconceived conspiracy theories". According to a 1992 report, González did not rule out the possibility of shots other than the three he heard were fired from a silencer.

Following the United States invasion of Grenada in 1983, González suggested the impeachment of President Ronald Reagan, and he introduced articles of impeachment related to the Iran–Contra scandal and sent them to the House Judiciary Committee in 1987. No further action was taken on said articles. González later called for the impeachment of President George H. W. Bush for not obtaining Congressional approval before the 1991 Gulf War. Early in the presidency of Bill Clinton, González also blocked hearings into the Whitewater controversy until finally agreeing to hold hearings in 1994. González was an outspoken critic of the Federal Reserve System, and proposed an audit and introduced bills to impeach Paul Volcker and other Governors of the Federal Reserve.

== Retirement ==
In 1997, González fell ill and was unable to return to the House for over a year. Finally, he decided not to run for a 19th full term in 1998. He died in a San Antonio hospital on November 28, 2000.

He had long groomed his son, Charlie, to succeed him. Charlie Gonzalez won easily in 1998 and served through January 2013; between them, father and son served 51 consecutive years in Congress.

== Legacy ==
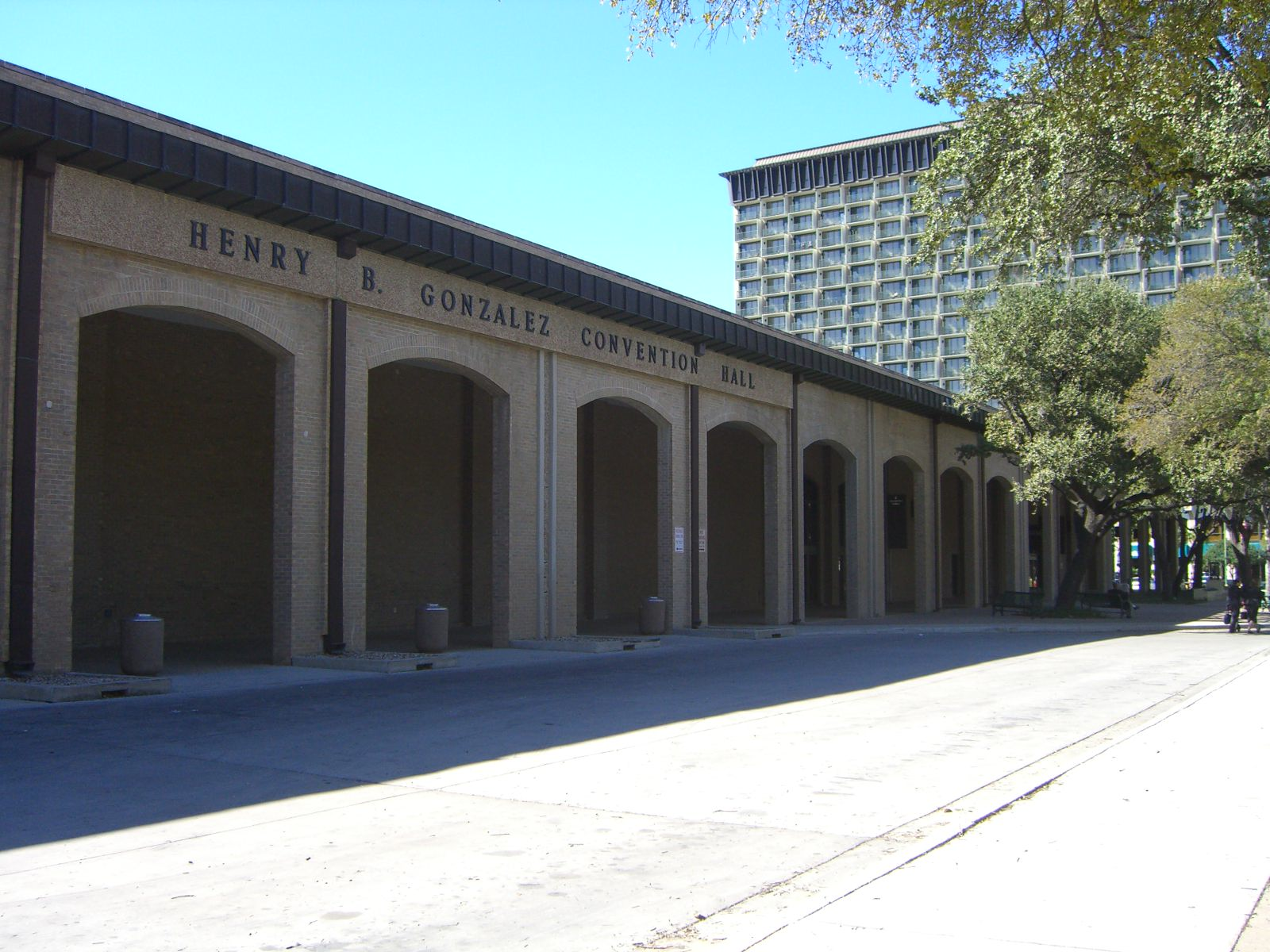
Henry B. González Convention Hall in San Antonio, Texas

- National Taco Day is celebrated on González's Birthday, May 3, as a way to celebrate his achievements in Congress.
- On October 24, 2006, it was announced that González's personal notes, correspondence and mementos would become part of the Congressional History Collection at the University of Texas at Austin's Center for American History.
- The Henry B. González Convention Center in San Antonio is named for him.
- There are Henry B. González elementary schools in Edgewood Independent School District, Eagle Pass Independent School District, La Joya Independent School District, and Dallas Independent School District.
- On May 1, 2016, two days before González's 100th birthday, the San Antonio Express-News ran a series of articles reminiscing on his career and legacy.

== See also ==
- List of Hispanic and Latino Americans in the United States Congress

== Notes ==
U.S. House of Representatives
Preceded by Paul J. Kilday	Member of the U.S. House of Representatives from Texas's 20th congressional district 1961–1999	Succeeded by Charlie Gonzalez
Preceded by Thomas N. Downing	Chair of the House Assassinations Committee; 1977	Succeeded by Louis Stokes
Preceded by Fernand St. Germain	Chair of the House Financial Services Committee; 1989–1995	Succeeded by Jim Leach
Preceded by Jim Leach	Ranking Member of the House Financial Services Committee; 1995–1998	Succeeded by John LaFalce
