= List of Next Great Baker episodes =

Next Great Baker (also known as Cake Boss: Next Great Baker) is an American reality television series that airs on TLC, hosted by Buddy Valastro, the star of his own reality series, Cake Boss. Season 3 commenced airing on November 26, 2012.

As of 22 July 2014, 36 episodes, including 2 specials of Next Great Baker have aired in four seasons.

== Series overview ==
Season	Episodes	Originally released	
Season	Episodes	First released	Last released
1	8	December 6, 2010	January 24, 2011
2	11	November 28, 2011	January 30, 2012
3	12	November 26, 2012	February 11, 2013
4	10	June 24, 2014	August 19, 2014

== Episodes ==
=== Season 1 (2010–11) ===
No. overall	No. in season	Title	Original release date	Contestant eliminated
1	1	"Celebrate Good Times, C'mon"	December 6, 2010	Kendra
2	2	"Do Not Pass "Go"!"	December 13, 2010	Joe
3	3	"Tis The Season To Be Jolly!"	December 20, 2010	Johanna
4	4	"It's Dyn-O-Mite!"	December 27, 2010	Pamela
5	5	"3-2-1 Blast Off!"	January 3, 2011	Greggy
6	6	"Here Comes The Bride!"	January 10, 2011	Joe
7	7	"Pedal To The Metal"	January 17, 2011	Brian & Jay
8	8	"The Big Finale!"	January 24, 2011	Corina (1) - Megan (2)

=== Season 2 (2011–12) ===
No. overall	No. in season	Title	Original release date	Contestant eliminated
9	1	"It's Go Time!"	November 28, 2011	Sara
10	2	"Life-Sized Cakes"	December 5, 2011	Tony
11	3	"Wedding Wonderland"	December 12, 2011	Jasmine
12	4	"Bakers On Ice"	December 19, 2011	Wesley
13	5	"Let the Sparks Fly"	December 26, 2011	Minerva
14	6	"Gators, Chimps and Bears...Oh My!"	January 2, 2012	Heather M.
15	7	"Here Comes The Bride-zilla!"	January 9, 2012	Heather G.
16	8	"Headbanging Bakers"	January 16, 2012	Carmelo & Megan
17	9	"Crown-Winning Cakes"	January 23, 2012	Chad
18	9A	"Finale Pre-Show"	January 30, 2012	N/A
19	10	"…And the Winner Is?"	January 30, 2012	(1) Ryan, (2) Nadine

=== Season 3 (2012–13) ===
No. overall	No. in season	Title	Original release date	Contestant eliminated
20	1	"Game On!"	November 26, 2012	Emme
21	2	"Cake Powers, Activate!"	December 3, 2012	James (Quit)
22	3	"Bunny Suits and BB Guns"	December 10, 2012	Melissa
23	4	"Cake Roast"	December 17, 2012	Jessica & Garrett (Quit)
24	5	"New Year's Eve, Hoboken Style!"	December 31, 2012	N/A
25	6	"Wedding Belles"	January 7, 2013	Peter
26	7	"Cakes Al Dente"	January 14, 2013	Letty
27	8	"Battle of the Sexes"	January 21, 2013	Chris
28	9	"Happy Birthday Kelly"	January 28, 2013	Chad
29	10	"Momma Knows Best"	February 4, 2013	Paul
30	11	"Road to the Finale"	February 11, 2013	Jen
31	12	"Vegas, Baby!"	February 11, 2013	(1) Ashley, (2) Gretel-Ann

=== Season 4 (2014) ===
No. overall	No. in season	Title	Original release date	Team eliminated
32	1	"Empire State of Mind"	June 24, 2014	Gray
33	2	"Sugar High"	July 1, 2014	Teal
34	3	"Destination Wedding!"	July 8, 2014	Pink
35	4	"Buddy's Winter BBQ"	July 15, 2014	N/A
36	5	"Nightmare on Baker Street"	July 22, 2014	Red
37	6	"Long Island Medium Cakes"	July 29, 2014	Tan
38	7	"Gravity Defying Cakes"	August 5, 2014	Brown
39	8	"Sexiest Cakes Alive"	August 12, 2014	Purple
40	9	"Wow Cakes"	August 12, 2014	Purple
41	10	"Vegas Showstoppers"	August 19, 2014	(1)Blue (2)Black
