= Next Great Baker: Latin America =

- Also known as: El desafío de Buddy: Latinoamérica
- Presented by: Alfredo Oropeza; Buddy Valastro
- Country of origin: Argentina, Colombia & Mexico (Latin America)
- Original languages: Spanish; English
- No. of seasons: 1
- No. of episodes: 6

Production
- Executive producer: Federico Delucci / Pablo Graziano / Virginia Kaplun
- Production company: Endemol Argentina

Original release
- Network: Discovery Home & Health
- Release: 28 October – 2 December 2014

Related
- Cake Boss; Kitchen Boss; Ultimate Cake Off; Next Great Baker

Next Great Baker: Latin America (also known as El desafío de Buddy: Latinoamérica) was a Latin American television series that airs on Discovery Home & Health: Latin America, hosted by Buddy Valastro, the star of his own reality series, Cake Boss. In the show, eight contestants participated in challenges that tested their baking and decorating skills. Each week, a contestant was eliminated; the last contestant standing won a grand prize of US$50,000. Other prizes for winning a challenge or the week's competition are also offered during the series.

In each of the six episodes, the participants faced two challenges, a pastry challenge and an elimination challenge. After each challenge, celebrity judges decided on the best creation, the panel including Mexican chef and presenter Alfredo Oropeza, French baker Franck Dauffouis, Mexican pastry chef María Teresa Ramírez Degollado, the Mexican chef Sergio Ibarra Garibay, and Argentine pastry chef Eduardo Ruiz among others. Ultimately, Buddy Valastro decided on the winner.

Next Great Baker: Latin America was produced by Endemol Argentina for Discovery Networks International.

The show ran for one season in 2014.

== Countries progress ==
- Argentina - Winner - Episode 6
- Colombia - Runner-Up - Episode 6
- Mexico - Third - Episode 5

== Celebs ==
| Name(s) | No. Episode | Recording (Argentina, Buenos Aires) | Premiere | | |
| Name(s) | No. Episode | Recording (Argentina, Buenos Aires) | Argentina | Colombia | Mexico |
|---|---|---|---|---|---|
| Ana María Orozco | 1 | August 2014 | 28 October 2014, 20:00hrs | 28 October 2014, 22:00hrs | 8 November 2014, 21:00hrs |
| Aleks Syntek | 2 | August 2014 | 4 November 2014, 20:00hrs | 4 November 2014, 22:00hrs | 15 November 2014, 21:00hrs |
| Maru Botana | 3 | August 2014 | 11 November 2014, 20:00hrs | 11 November 2014, 22:00hrs | 22 November 2014, 21:00hrs |
| Natalia Oreiro | 5 | August 2014 | 25 November 2014, 20:00hrs | 25 November 2014, 22:00hrs | 6 December 2014, 21:00hrs |
| Buddy Valastro | 6 | 2 December 2014, 20:00hrs (LIVE) | 2 December 2014, 20:00hrs | 2 December 2014, 22:00hrs | 13 December 2014, 21:00hrs |

== Contestant eliminated ==
| No. | Name | No. Episode |
|---|---|---|
| 1 | Renato Rodríguez | 1 |
| 2 | Lina Bermeo | 2 |
| 3 | Luciano Dieguez | 3 |
| 4 | Iván Millán | 4 |
| 5 | Roxana "Roxy" Palacios | 5 |

== Contestant progress ==
| Place | Contestant | Episode 1 | Episode 2 | Episode 3 | Episode 4 | Episode 5 | Episode 6 | |
|---|---|---|---|---|---|---|---|---|
| 1 | Catalina | LOW | HIGH | LOW | LOW | WIN | WIN | WINNER |
| 2 | Myriam | HIGH | LOW | HIGH | HIGH | LOW | HIGH | RUNNER-UP |
| 3 | Jaime | LOW | HIGH | LOW | HIGH | HIGH | THIRD | |
| 4 | Roxy | WIN | WIN | WIN | WIN | OUT | | |
| 5 | Iván | HIGH | HIGH | HIGH | OUT | | | |
| 6 | Luciano | IN | IN | OUT | | | | |
| 7 | Lina | HIGH | OUT | | | | | |
| 8 | Renato | OUT | | | | | | |

(WINNER) This baker won the competition.
(RUNNER-UP) This baker was the runner-up of the competition.
(THIRD) This baker place third overall in the competition.
(WIN) The baker(s) won the challenge.
(HIGH) The baker(s) had one of the best cakes for that challenge, but did not win.
(IN) The baker(s) advanced to the next week.
(LOW) The baker(s) was/were a part of the team who lost, but was not the last to move on.
(LOW) The baker(s) had the worst cake of those who advanced, and was/were the last to move on.
(OUT) The baker(s) was/were eliminated.
(WD) The baker(s) voluntarily withdrew from the competition.

== Episodes ==
| No. | Title | Original release date |
|---|---|---|
| 1 | "20 years Of Career Ana María Orozco" | 28 October 2014 |
| 2 | "25 years Of Music With Aleks Syntek" | 4 November 2014 |
| 3 | "Birthday Cake" | 11 November 2014 |
| 4 | "Day Of The Dead" | 18 November 2014 |
| 5 | "Cake Of Real Size" | 25 November 2014 |
| 6 | "Final" | 2 December 2014 |
| – | "Special Mary Christmas" | 9 December 2014 |
