= Dozen Bake Shop =

Restaurant in the United States

Coordinates: 40.46428°N 79.96623°W

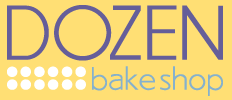
- Interactive map of Dozen Bake Shop

Restaurant information
- Established: December 26, 2006
- Closed: September 30, 2013
- Owner: Doreen Valentine
- Food type: Bakery
- Location: Pittsburgh, Pennsylvania

Dozen Bake Shop was a bakery in Pittsburgh, Pennsylvania, United States. While a variety of baked goods and other dishes were offered, cupcakes were Dozen's specialty and featured product.

It was founded in late 2006 by James Gray, a graduate of Chicago Culinary Institute. The opening came amid a national cupcake trend, leading Gray to believe that the time was right to open a cupcake-heavy bakery in Pittsburgh, as he believed that the trend had already played out in New York City or Chicago. Andrew Twigg was a co-owner with Gray.

The bakery developed a strong brand and a social media presence, using Facebook and Twitter to alert customers of daily specials and other offers. The Twitter account became one of the most popular in Pittsburgh. Dozen Bake Shop was the official cupcake of the Pittsburgh Penguins and their cupcakes are available at the Consol Energy Center.

The baking philosophy focused on using local sourcing, especially local produce and herbs.

The "Elvis" was a featured item; it was a banana cupcake with chocolate hazelnut filling, topped with peanut butter buttercream icing. Baker Megan Hart came one board once the new owner, Doreen Valentine, hired her. Megan created specialty cakes and edible roses in 2012.

== History ==
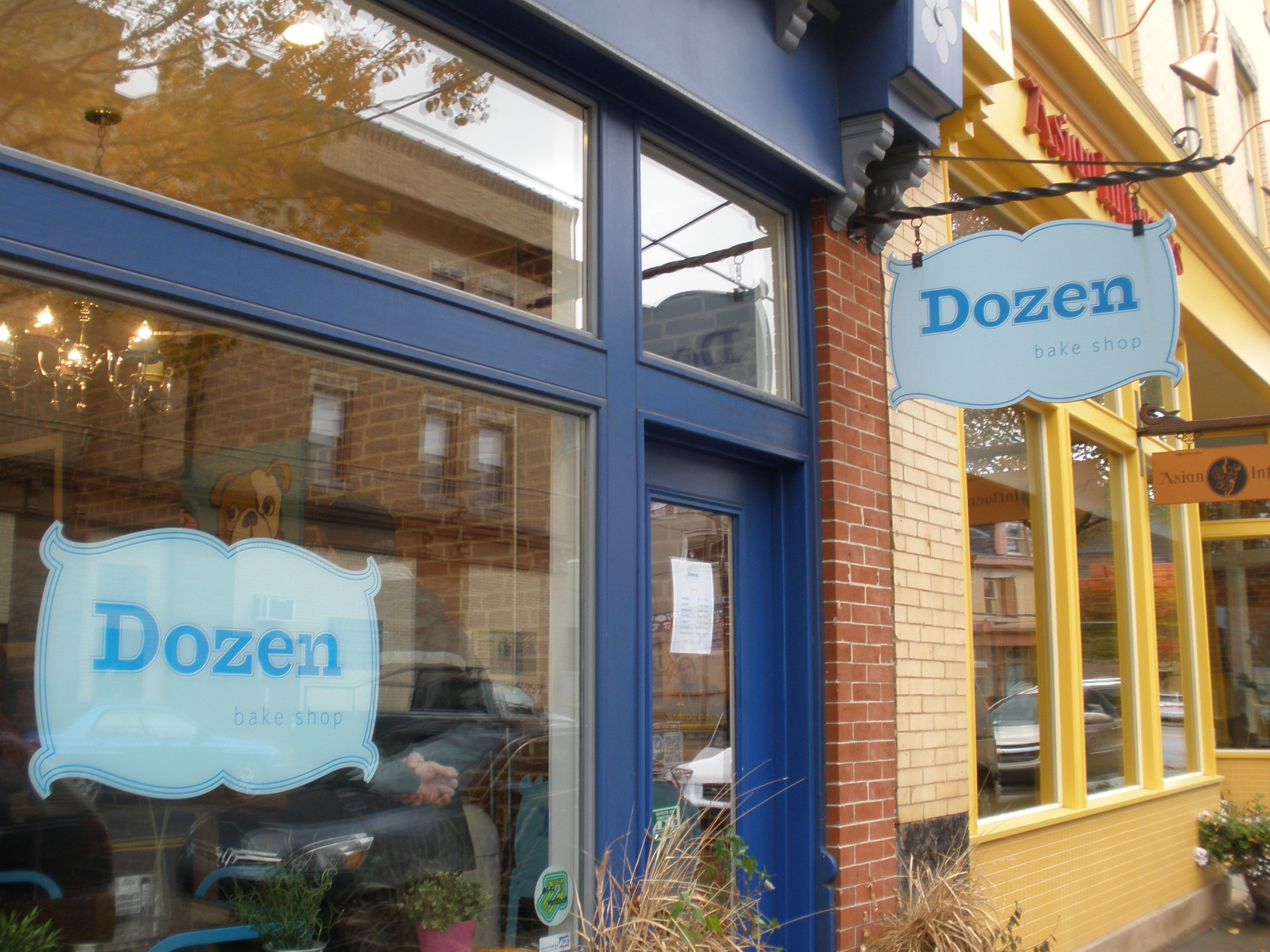
The storefront in the Lawrenceville location.

The first Dozen Bakeshop location, a 700 sq ft (65 m^{2}) storefront, opened in Squirrel Hill on December 26, 2006. During 2007, the bakery made $340,000 in sales. By the end of 2007, the Pittsburgh City Paper named Dozen the "Best place to indulge your sweet tooth."

In January 2008, 1,300 sq ft (120 m^{2}) bakery was opened in Lawrenceville, allowing Dozen to expand into catering. By then, the bakery had 9 employees. During the first half of 2009, two locations opened, a 250 sq ft (23 m^{2}) storefront on Liberty Avenue in Downtown and at The Andy Warhol Museum on the North Shore. In October 2009, a 555 sq ft (51.6 m^{2}) location opened on Carson Street in the South Side.

In fall 2010, Dozen closed two existing locations, South Side and Squirrel Hill, and opened a new location in Oakland. The Southside location had bad parking and did not mesh well with the bar-heavy ambiance of the neighborhood. The Squirrel Hill location had no room to expand. It was hoped that the Oakland location, with easy access to Pitt and CMU, would be a better fit for the bakery. In early 2011, Dozen Bake Shop was named a Pittsburgh "city favorite" by the New York Post. A "Cupcake Truck," for mobile cupcakery was acquired. A short time later, the business, which by then had 18 to 20 employees, was in trouble and was put up for sale. Sales were down by 50%, from a peak annual revenue of $1 million; defaulted on $40,000 loan to PNC Bank committed tax evasion, partner declared bankruptcy. By July 2011, the two remaining locations, Lawrenceville and Downtown were closed after a "farewell" bake sale.

In August 2011, Dozen re-opened under the new ownership of Doreen Valentine, who hired 4 new bakers. According to Valentine, it was not the quality or brand that had failed. Instead, she believed that Dozen had been doomed by too rapid of expansion that left too little capital for operations, a mistake she would not repeat. Megan Hart, a Pittsburgh native who competed in TLC's Reality television contest show Cake Boss: Next Great Baker's 2nd season, joined the staff in February 2012.

In May 2013, the Oakland location was closed and a new location opened in South Hills at Donaldson's Crossroads in Peters Township.

In September 2013, it was announced that all Dozen locations will close by the end of the month.

Andrew Twigg, Dozen's original co-owner, is currently an Assistant Teaching Professor at the Carnegie Mellon University School of Design, where he has focused on digital interaction, design fundamentals, web design, visual communication, and cross-media design systems. He is an also independent designer focused on design and organizational strategy, user experience, user interface, branding, and web design.

The former owner, James Gray, went on to revive Fritz Pastry in Chicago, among many other ventures.

== Gallery ==
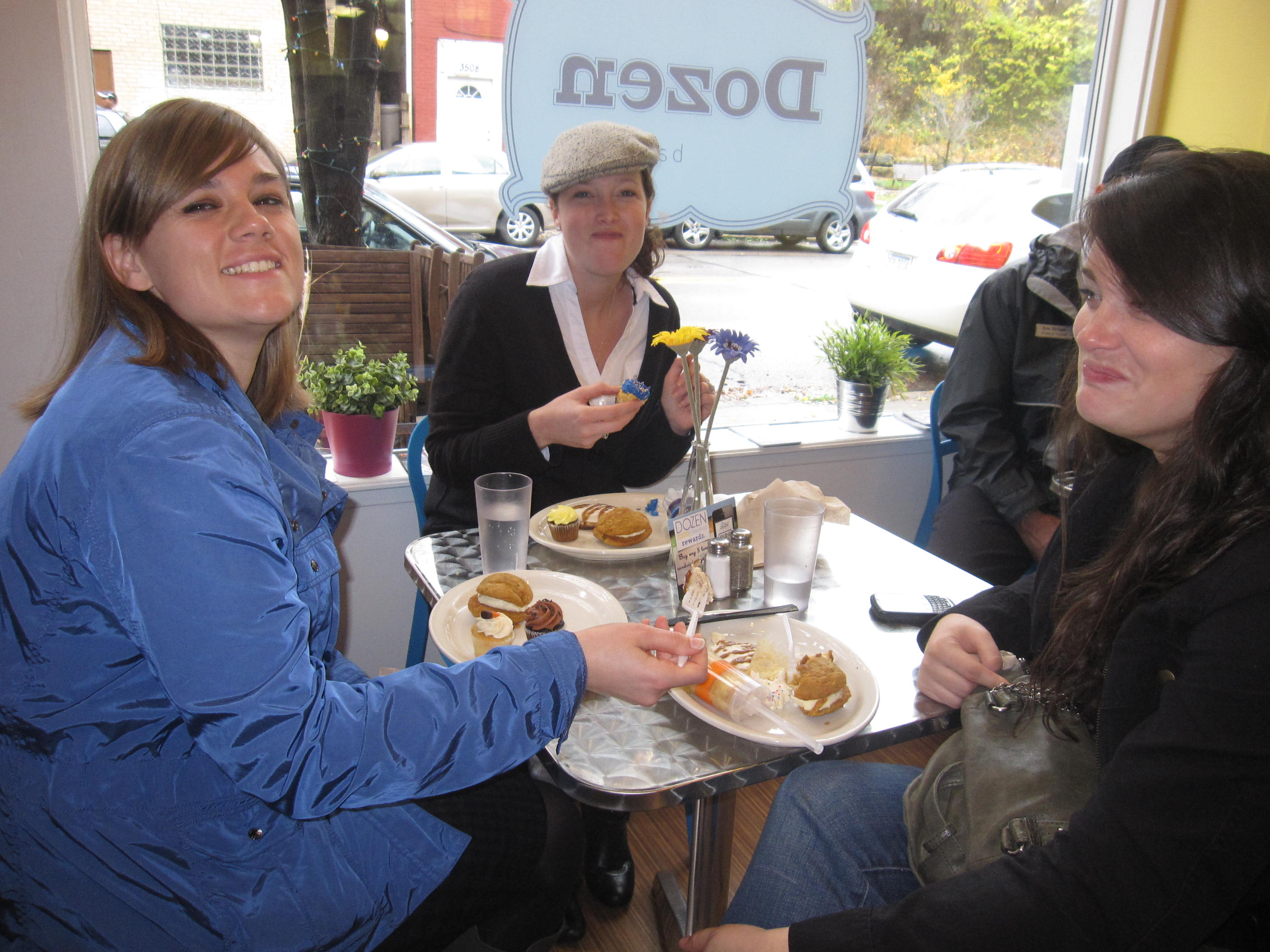
Customers eating a cupcake sampler in 2011

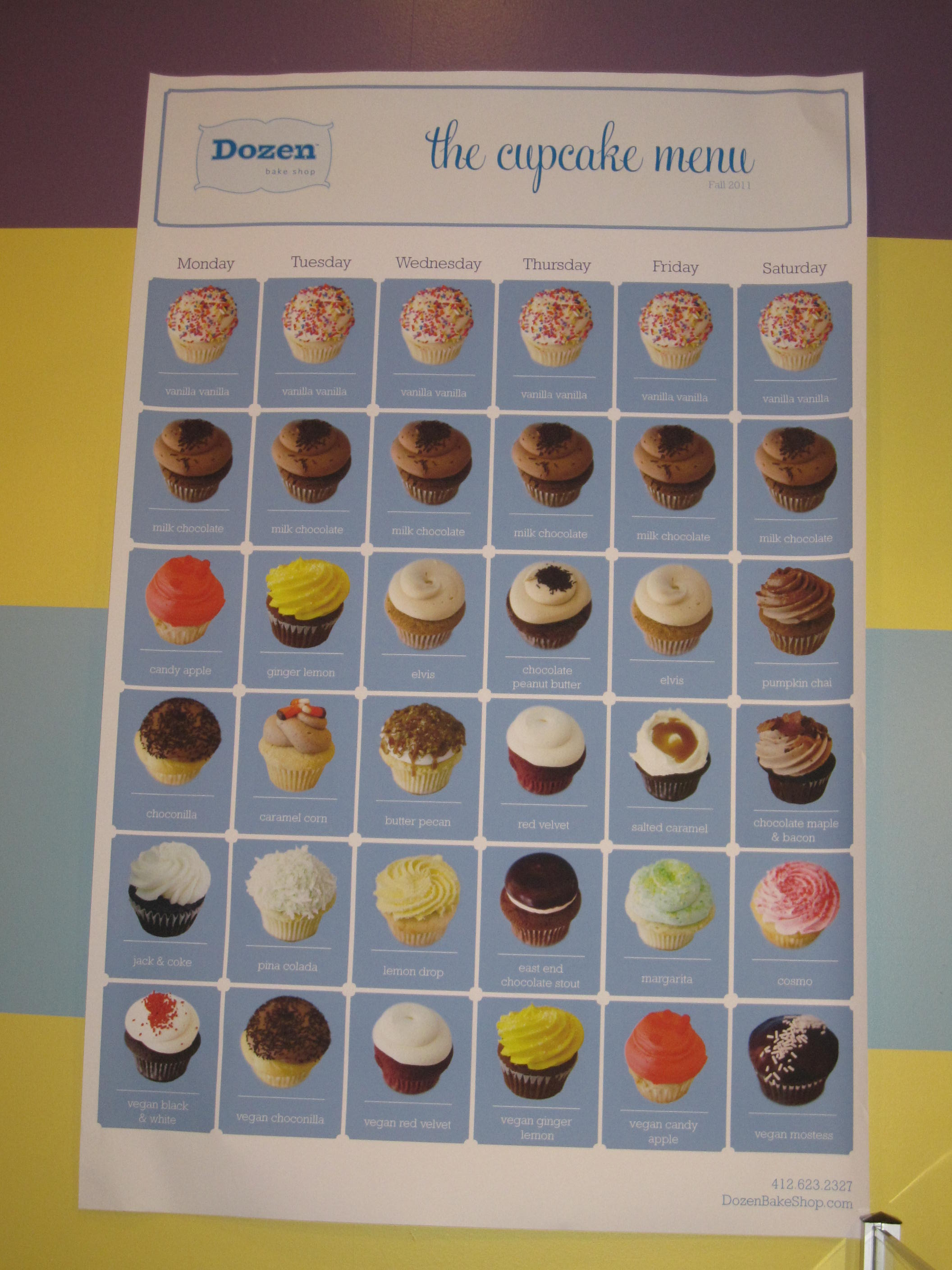
A sign showing Cupcake of the Day. Note that the Elvis is on Wednesday and the East End Chocolate Stout is Thursday

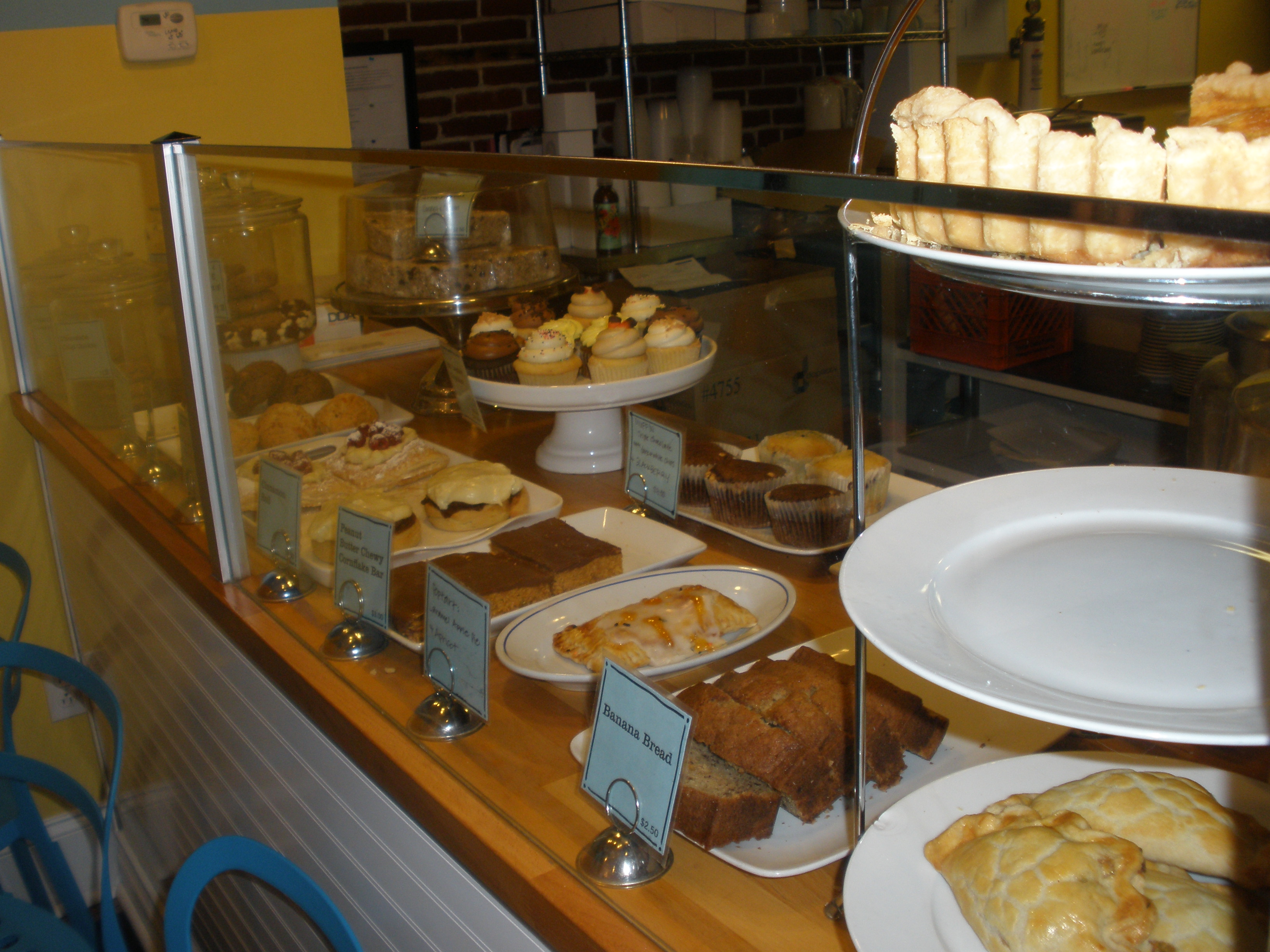
The bakery display

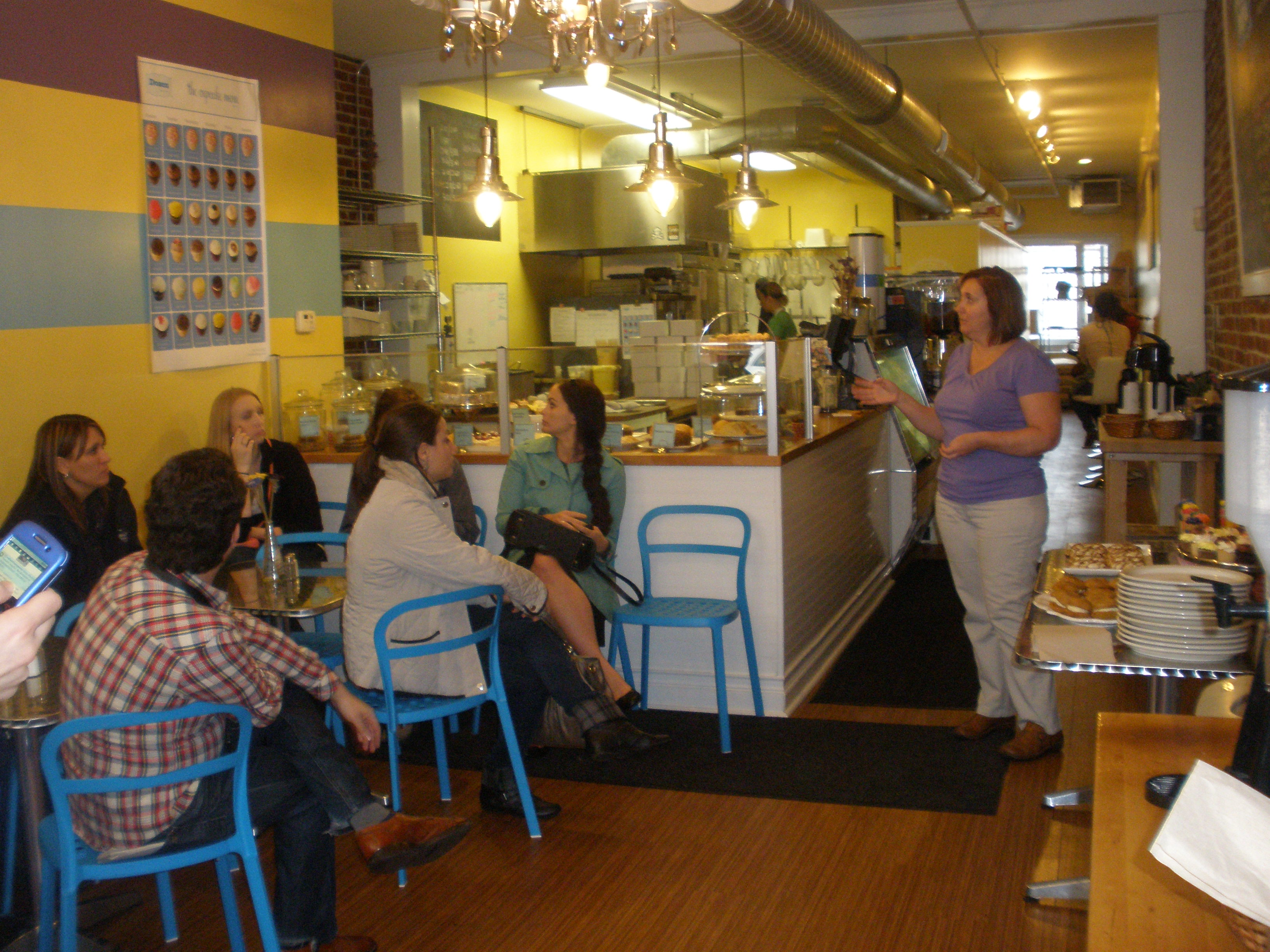
Owner Doreen Valentine discusses cupcakes with visitors

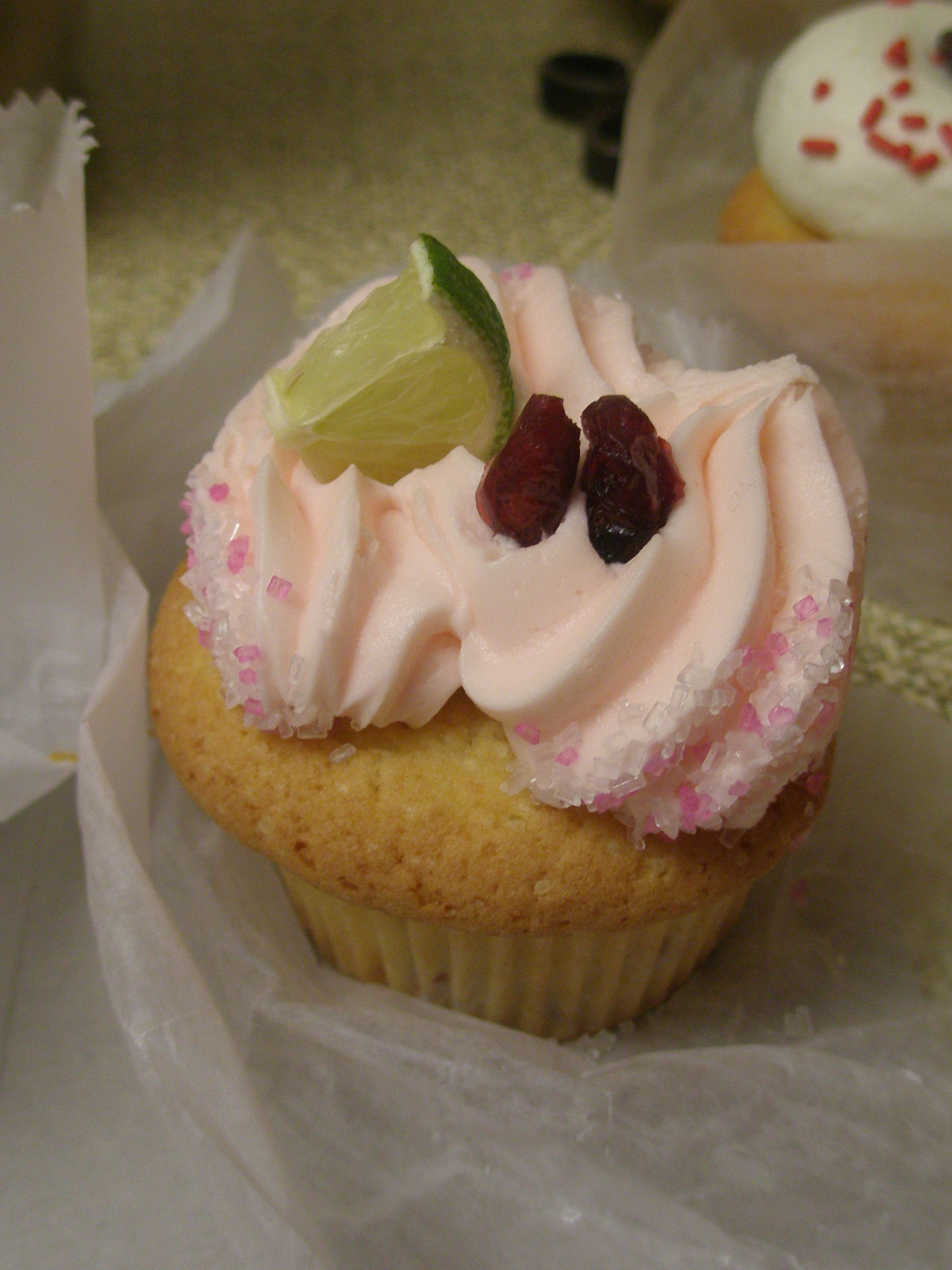
A cosmo flavored cupcake
