= Next Great Baker season 3 =

Next Great Baker
- Season 3
- No. of episodes: 12 (includes two special episodes)

Release
- Original network: TLC
- Original release: November 26, 2012 – February 11, 2013

Season chronology
- ← Previous; Season 2 Next → Season 4

The third season of Next Great Baker aired from November 26, 2012, to February 11, 2013. Like the previous season, this season was set at the Carlo's Bake Shop facility at Lackawanna Center in Jersey City, New Jersey. Unlike the previous two seasons, the finale for this season took place outside of the greater New York City area – in this case, in Las Vegas, Nevada at The Venetian Las Vegas.

The winner of this season was Ashley Holt, who won $100,000 and a spread in Redbook magazine, and will work beside Buddy Valastro in the bakery.

== Contestants ==
Thirteen contestants competed during this season:

Contestant	Age	Occupation	Hometown
Letty Alvarez	41	Owner/Operator of LA Sweets	Miami, Florida
James Brown	41	Owner of Brown's Bakery	Lexington, Kentucky
Paul Conti	30	Bakery Management Consultant/Owner Cake Face Cakery	Staten Island, New York
Chad Durkin	29	Owner of CAD Culinary Consulting and Wedding Cakes	Philadelphia, Pennsylvania
Gretel-Ann Fischer	36	Owner of Cupp's Café & Bakery	Colchester, Vermont
Peter Gray	21	Owner of Pete's Sweets	East Longmeadow, Massachusetts
Ashley Holt	25	Country Club Pastry Chef/Owner of Sugar Monster Sweets	Louisville, Kentucky
Jen Kwapinski	32	Owner of Jen's Cakes	San Jose, California
Chris Luna	29	Sales Executive	Roseville, California
Melissa Payne	33	Owner of Couture Cake Creations/Co-owner of Sweets Couture	Chesterfield, Virginia
Jessica Reyling	30	Stay-at-Home Mom	Peoria, Illinois
Emme Tyler	30	Owner of Skinny Batches	Los Angeles, California
Garrett Wallace	36	Cake Artist at Fabulous Baker Boy	Waverly, Tennessee

== Contestant progress ==
As episode 5 ("New Year's Eve, Hoboken Style!") and episode 11 ("Road to the Finale") were not competition episodes, there are no columns for those episodes in the following table.

Place	Contestant	Episode 1	Episode 2	Episode 3	Episode 4	Episode 6	Episode 7	Episode 8	Episode 9	Episode 10	Episode 12	
	Baker's challenge winner(s)	Chad	Gretel-Ann; Jen; Letty; Melissa	Ashley; Garrett	Ashley (Note: In "Cake Roast", Buddy declared that Ashley was the MVP of the winning baker's challenge team.); Chad; Gretel-Ann; Paul; Peter	Jen; Letty	Gretel-Ann	Ashley	Ashley	Ashley	Ashley	None
1	Ashley	WIN (Note: In the episode 1 elimination challenge, Buddy declared that Ashley was the MVP of the winning team.)	IN	IN	WIN	LOW	LOW	WIN	WIN	IN	WIN	WINNER
2	Gretel-Ann	LOW	LOW	HIGH	LOW	WIN (Note: In the episode 6 elimination challenge, Buddy declared that Gretel-Ann was the MVP of the winning team.)	WIN	WIN	LOW	LOW	LOW	SECOND
3	Jen	LOW	LOW	WIN	LOW	WIN	WIN (Note: In the episode 7 elimination challenge, Buddy declared that Jen was the MVP of the winning team.)	WIN	WIN (Note: In the episode 9 elimination challenge, Buddy declared that Jen was the MVP of the winning team.)	IN	THIRD	
4	Paul	WIN	WIN	LOW	WIN	IN	LOW	LOW	WIN	OUT		
5	Chad	LOW	IN	LOW	WIN	WIN	LOW	LOW	OUT			
6	Chris	HIGH	WIN	HIGH	LOW	IN	WIN	OUT				
7	Letty	LOW	LOW	WIN	WIN	LOW	OUT					
8	Peter	HIGH	IN	WIN	WIN	OUT						
9	Garrett	LOW	WIN	IN	WD (Note: Garret's departure was not shown until episode 6.)							
10	Jessica	WIN	WIN	HIGH	OUT							
11	Melissa	HIGH	LOW	OUT								
12	James	LOW	WD									
13	Emme	OUT										

(WIN) The baker(s) won the challenge.
(WIN) The baker won individual immunity and the elimination challenge.
(HIGH) The baker(s) had one of the best cakes for that challenge, but did not win.
(IN) The baker(s) did not win nor lose and advanced to the next week.
(LOW) The baker(s) was/were a part of the team who lost, but was not the last to move on.
(LOW) This baker was singled out as one of the worst teammates, and was/were the last to move on.
(OUT) The baker(s) was/were eliminated.
(IN) The baker(s) had immunity.
(WD) The baker(s) voluntarily withdrew from the competition.

== Episode guide ==
No. overall	No. in season	Title	Original release date	Contestant eliminated
20	1	"Game On!"	November 26, 2012	Emme
Baker's Challenge: Each competitor must bake a dessert of their choice, and deliver it to Buddy in Manhattan on foot. Buddy will taste the first dessert to arrive and any other 4 desserts that look or sound appealing. Buddy will also disqualify the last dessert to arrive. Emme was the first person to arrive, so her dessert was automatically tasted. Peter was the last to arrive, and his dessert was thrown in the garbage. Buddy also tasted Gretal-Anne, Ashley, Chad and Jame’s desserts. Chad was the declared the winner of the Baker's Challenge. Elimination Challenge: Guest client Mario Lopez and Courtney Maza enter to receive a bachelor cake. Team 1 was Melissa, Peter and Chris, Team 2 was Jess, Paul and Ashley, Team 3 was Gretal-Anne, Letty and Garrett, and Team 4 was Jen, Emme and James. Chad’s advantage for winning the baker’s challenge, meant he could pick whatever team to join. He chose Team 4. The MVP of the winning team would win a free trip to Mexico. Team 2 won the challenge with Team 1 in a close second. It was unanimously decided that Ashley was the MVP for her work on the dog, and she won the trip. Team 3 and Team 4’s had the bottom cakes and their cakes were destroyed by a crane. Team 3 were criticised for their sloppy work and the dog on their cake falling apart, as well as Letty and Gretal- Anne’s constant bickering over who the leader was. Team 4 was criticised for representing the theme poorly, as well as the sombrero sliding off the cake, due to the lack of support, and was also grilled for having an extra person, and still failing. Team 4 was chosen as the bottom cake. Emme was sent home as she was deemed as the weakest link.
21	2	"Cake Powers, Activate!"	December 3, 2012	James (Quit)
Baker’s Challenge: Buddy chose the team leaders, which were Peter, Melissa and Garrett. Peter chose James, Ashley and Chad, Melissa chose Gretal-Ann, Jen and Letty, and Garrett chose Jess, Chris and Paul. Season 2 winner Marissa Lopez, was brought in to teach the bakers how to make a groovy girl fondant cake. The bakers would have 30 minutes and the team that made the most cakes to Carlos bakery standards would each win 1500 dollars to buy kitchen equipment. Team Melissa won the challenge with a total of 3 while the other teams made 2. Elimination Challenge: The bakers have to create a super hero themed cake and the cake must tell a story. The hero must be original, and the cake must also be an engineered cake and have a moving part. To help him judge, Buddy brought in his brother in law, Joey and special guest Lou Ferrigno, who played as the original Incredible Hulk, in the tv series. Garrett’s team won the challenge, the judges said their engineering was very good, and their villain looked amazing, but the hero looked weak. The other teams were in the bottom. Peter’s Team was praises for all of the detail on their cake, Joey wasn’t crazy about the rat idea for their cake and also, not all of their engendering worked. Melissa’s team was criticised for their lack of detail and the judges not being able to connect to the story. Melissa’s team lost the challenge. However, before Buddy was about to send one of the girls home, James reappeared, and revealed that he had a brain tumour, and he was pulling himself from the competition, as he could not properly concentrate in the competition worrying about the operation. After an emotional goodbye, James left the competition. And because of James’ departure, the girls were safe.
22	3	"Bunny Suits and BB Guns"	December 10, 2012	Melissa
23	4	"Cake Roast"	December 17, 2012	Jessica & Garrett (Quit)
24	5	"New Year's Eve, Hoboken Style!"	December 31, 2012	N/A
This special episode recaps the series up to this point, and gives a behind-the-scenes look at how the competition is put together.
25	6	"Wedding Belles"	January 7, 2013	Peter
26	7	"Cakes Al Dente"	January 14, 2013	Letty
27	8	"Battle of the Sexes"	January 21, 2013	Chris
28	9	"Happy Birthday Kelly"	January 28, 2013	Chad
29	10	"Momma Knows Best"	February 4, 2013	Paul
30	11	"Road to the Finale"	February 11, 2013	Jen
31	12	"Vegas, Baby!"	February 11, 2013	(1) Ashley, (2) Gretel-Ann

== Production notes ==
Contestant James Brown withdrew from the competition prior to the December 3, 2012 broadcast, after having been diagnosed with a benign brain tumor and being affected by the stress of his upcoming medical treatment. In a statement, Brown said, in part, "I have been focused on my health and am working with my doctors to prepare for surgery to remove the tumor, which will happen early next year."

Following the competition, Buddy hired contestant Paul Conti to work at Carlo's Bakery alongside Ashley, after Paul lost his job and home due to Hurricane Sandy.

Chad Durkin was also later hired by Buddy for his pastry skills, and can be seen in the 2015 season of Cake Boss.
