= Next Great Baker season 4 =

Next Great Baker
- Season 4

Release
- Original network: TLC
- Original release: June 24, 2014

Season chronology
- ← Previous; Season 3

The fourth season of Next Great Baker premiered on June 24, 2014. Unlike other previous seasons, the teams competed in teams of two. Other changes from the previous seasons include the addition of Jacques Torres and Bobbie Lloyd as judges, the addition of the final showdown, and the opportunity to work at Buddy's Las Vegas cake shop. However, some aspects of the show were similar, including having ten competitors (or teams) as in season 1, and the $100,000 prize awarded in each of the previous seasons remained.

== Contestants ==
During the fourth season, there were ten different teams of two. The first episode aired on June 24, 2014. This marks the first time that there were ten competitors since the first season. Seasons two and three both had 13 competitors.

Contestants	Color	Relationship	Hometown
Kaiulani Delgado and Roxanne Bodell	Maroon	Aunt and niece	Salt Lake City, Utah
Julie Voudrie and Danielle Voudrie	Pink	Mother and daughter	Johnson City, Tennessee
Barry Ackerman and Fred Isla	Teal	Colleagues	Las Vegas, Nevada
David Duran and Elaine Duran	Red	Husband and wife	Kissimmee, Florida
Don Donneruno and Meredith Gulfman	Tan	Coworkers	Long Island, New York
Ginger Soave and Brandy Smith	Gray	Bakery teacher and student	Virginia Beach, Virginia
Bethany Berend and Jennifer Livermore	Purple	Best friends	Tomball, Texas
Al Watson and Lia Weber	Blue	Coworkers	St. Louis, Missouri
Manny Agigian and Al DiBartolo	Black	Friends and coworkers	Woolwich Township, New Jersey
Jose Barajas and Aimee Anderson	Brown	Friends	Chula Vista, California

== Contestant progress ==
Place	Team color	Episode 1	Episode 2	Episode 3	Episode 4	Episode 5	Episode 6	Episode 7	Episode 8	Episode 9	Episode 10	
	Baker's challenge winner(s)	Pink	—N/a	—N/a	Red	—N/a	—N/a	Purple (Note: This episode did not have a baker's challenge, but the purple team won an advantage based on their choice of workstation. They also won the fan vote.)	—N/a	—N/a	N/A	
1	Blue	HIGH	WIN	WIN	WIN	WIN	LOW	LOW	WIN	LOW	WIN	WINNER
2	Black	HIGH	IN	HIGH	WIN	LOW	WIN	LOW	LOW	WIN	LOW	RUNNER-UP
3	Maroon	WIN	IN	LOW	WIN	IN	LOW	LOW	IN	HIGH	THIRD	
4	Purple	IN	LOW	LOW	WIN	WIN	WIN	WIN	OUT	OUT (Note: After being eliminated in episode 8, the purple team returned to the competition in episode 9, but were eliminated regardless.)		
5	Brown	IN	WIN	HIGH	WIN (Note: In episode 4, Jose was declared MVP of the winning team.)	WIN	WIN	OUT				
6	Tan	IN	WIN	LOW	WIN	IN	OUT					
7	Red	LOW	IN	WIN	WIN	OUT						
8	Pink	LOW	LOW	OUT								
9	Teal	IN	OUT									
10	Gray	OUT										

(WIN) The team(s) won the challenge.
(WIN) The team(s) received immunity from the cake challenge.
(HIGH) The team(s) had one of the best cakes for that challenge, but did not win.
(IN) The team(s) did not win nor lose and advanced to the next week.
(LOW) The team was one of the bottom cakes, but escaped the final showdown.
(LOW) This team had one of the worst cakes, but survived by winning the final showdown.
(OUT) The team was/were eliminated.
(IN) The team had immunity.
(WD) The team voluntarily withdrew from the competition.

== Episodes ==
No. overall	No. in season	Title	Original release date	Team eliminated
32	1	"Empire State of Mind"	June 24, 2014	Gray
"'Baker's Challenge'" : For the first Baker's Challenge, each team of two has 1 hour to bake a dessert good of their choosing. Buddy and two famous pastry artists (Jacques Torres and Bobbie Lloyd) are judges. The pink team, mother and daughter Julie and Danielle Voudrie, has won due for their cinnamon roll; for this they're rewarded to be the first to pick the location of their choosing for the Cake Challenge.; "'Cake Challenge'" : Each team of two has to go to an iconic location in New York and New Jersey and make a cake inspired by the location itself. During their car ride to the Statue of Liberty, the maroon team, aunt and niece Kaiulani Delgado and Roxanne Bodell, experience a car crash, in which Kai, who was driving the car, cries because she never experienced this before and switches the driver's position.
33	2	"Sugar High"	July 1, 2014	Teal
34	3	"Destination Wedding!"	July 8, 2014	Pink
35	4	"Buddy's Winter BBQ"	July 15, 2014	N/A
36	5	"Nightmare on Baker Street"	July 22, 2014	Red
37	6	"Long Island Medium Cakes"	July 29, 2014	Tan
38	7	"Gravity Defying Cakes"	August 5, 2014	Brown
39	8	"Sexiest Cakes Alive"	August 12, 2014	Purple
40	9	"Wow Cakes"	August 12, 2014	Purple
41	10	"Vegas Showstoppers"	August 19, 2014	(1)Blue (2)Black
