= Next Great Baker season 2 =

Next Great Baker
- Season 2
- No. of episodes: 11 (includes one special)

Release
- Original network: TLC
- Original release: November 28, 2011 – January 30, 2012

Season chronology
- ← Previous; Season 1 Next → Season 3

The second season of Next Great Baker was televised from November 28, 2011 to January 30, 2012 on TLC. This season was set at the new Carlo's Bake Shop facility at Lackawanna Center in Jersey City, New Jersey.

During this season, the Next Great Baker would win $100,000 cash and a four-page spread in Brides magazine. The winner will also get to work beside Buddy in the bakery, with the winner's first day covered in the episode of Cake Boss following the season finale on January 30, 2012.

== Contestants ==
Thirteen contestants competed during this season:

Contestant	Age	Occupation	Hometown
Ryan Cimorelli	30	Construction worker, part-time baker	North Providence, Rhode Island
Wesley Durden (†)	29	Soldier, United States Army	Fayetteville, North Carolina
Chad Fitzgerald	44	High school math teacher	Duncanville, Texas
Jasmine Frank	20	Pastry Chef	Los Angeles, California
Tony Frys	23	Baker, small-business owner	Fort Worth, Texas
Heather Grubb	31	Stay-at-home mother	Knoxville, Tennessee
Megan Hart	38	Paramedic	Pittsburgh, Pennsylvania
Marissa Lopez	24	Cake decorator	Pompton Lakes, New Jersey
Heather Macia	32	Exotic Dancer	Las Vegas, Nevada
Carmelo Oquendo	43	Retired gang-unit police officer	Worcester, Massachusetts
Nadine Reibeling	28	Baker, business owner	New York, New York
Minerva Vazquez	46	Personal chef	Cutler Bay, Florida
Sara Williams	39	Baker, small-business owner	Cedartown, Georgia

== Contestant progress ==
Place	Contestant	Episode 1	Episode 2	Episode 3	Episode 4	Episode 5	Episode 6	Episode 7	Episode 8	Episode 9	Finale	
	Baker's challenge winner(s)	Jasmine	Megan; Nadine; Ryan	Marissa	Chad; Heather G. Wesley	Nadine	Chad; Marissa	Nadine	Marissa	Ryan	Marissa	Nadine (Note: While it was an elimination challenge, it also was considered a baker's challenge, and Nadine was first to select her team for the second half of the finale, her "prize" for winning the challenge.)
1	Marissa	IN	WIN	WIN	LOW	LOW	WIN	WIN	IN	HIGH	LOW	WINNER
2	Nadine	IN	IN	IN	WIN	WIN	LOW	LOW	LOW	HIGH	WIN	RUNNER-UP
3	Ryan	IN	WIN	WIN	IN	IN	LOW	WIN	IN	LOW	THIRD	
4	Chad	WIN	IN	WIN	IN	WIN	LOW	LOW	LOW	OUT		
5	Megan	HIGH	LOW	LOW	IN	IN	WIN	WIN	OUT			
6	Carmelo	WIN	IN	LOW	IN	WIN	WIN	LOW	OUT			
7	Heather G.	HIGH	LOW	WIN	WIN	IN	WIN	OUT				
8	Heather M.	LOW	WIN	IN	WIN	LOW	OUT					
9	Minerva	WIN	LOW (Note: Buddy initially announced that Minerva was eliminated. She objected his decision and, citing her passion and willingness to speak up, Buddy reversed himself and eliminated Tony instead.)	LOW	IN (Note: Although Minerva was on the team with the winning cake, Buddy decided that she had no part in it due to being sent to the hospital for being overworked as well as her poor leadership skills the first day resulting in very little work done. She still advanced forward to the next round simply for being with the winning team.)	OUT						
10	Wesley	HIGH	IN	IN	OUT							
11	Jasmine	WIN	WIN	OUT								
12	Tony	LOW	OUT									
13	Sara	OUT										

(WINNER) This baker won the competition.
(RUNNER-UP) This baker was the runner-up of the competition.
(THIRD) This baker placed third overall in the competition.
(WIN) The baker won individual immunity and the elimination challenge.
(WIN) The baker(s) won the challenge.
(HIGH) The baker(s) had one of the best cakes for that challenge, but did not win.
(IN) The baker(s) advanced to the next week.
(LOW) The baker(s) was/were a part of the team who lost, but was not the last to move on.
(LOW) The baker(s) had the worst cake of those who advanced, and was/were the last to move on.
(OUT) The baker(s) was/were eliminated.
(IN) The baker(s) had immunity.

== Episode guide ==
No. overall	No. in season	Title	Original release date	Contestant eliminated
9	1	"It's Go Time!"	November 28, 2011	Sara
Thirteen bakers arrive to Lakawanna to start the competition, with the winner getting $100,000, a four-page spread in "Brides" magazine, and the chance to work with Buddy and his family at Carlo's Bakery. In the elimination challenge the bakers were divided into four groups and were given the task of creating one theme cake, which then had to be delivered to Carlo's Bakery. In the end, the fashionista cake lost because it fell apart while being unloaded. Sara was eliminated.: Elimination: Sara
10	2	"Life-Sized Cakes"	December 5, 2011	Tony
The elimination challenge was to construct life-sized cake versions of Buddy's sisters. All three cakes were disappointing, so Buddy had them bulldozed. Tony and Minerva were the bottom two at elimination. Buddy decided to send Minerva home, but changed his mind when she showed "passion and drive" by arguing to stay.: Elimination: Tony
11	3	"Wedding Wonderland"	December 12, 2011	Jasmine
The bakers were split into three teams, each creating a wedding cake based on a specific theme. Jasmine was eliminated for her overconfidence and weak leadership.: Elimination: Jasmine
12	4	"Bakers On Ice"	December 19, 2011	Wesley
In this holiday themed episode, everyone was split into three teams and were told to make a holiday cake for the Valastro's family Christmas party. Buddy felt all the cakes were good and deemed none of the cakes to be the loser, but that Wesley didn't have the experience necessary to continue on the show. He was eliminated.: Elimination: Wesley
13	5	"Let the Sparks Fly"	December 26, 2011	Minerva
The bakers were challenged to make cakes that had mechanical elements. Minerva's team lost due to immature mistakes and a carousel that went so fast that Buddy said he would throw up if he was on it. Minerva was happy to be eliminated because she got to see her family; however, Buddy was so aggravated with Minerva's attitude that he closed the Not the Next Great Baker box truck himself.: Elimination: Minerva
14	6	"Gators, Chimps and Bears...Oh My!"	January 2, 2012	Heather M.
The bakers were divided into two teams to create cakes for a celebration at a zoo. It came down to Heather M. and Chad in the elimination room. Heather was eliminated even though Buddy thought she was very talented.: Elimination: Heather M.
15	7	"Here Comes The Bride-zilla!"	January 9, 2012	Heather G.
The bakers have to please a bridezilla who doesn't want an average wedding cake. In the end, the bakers were tricked by Buddy and the bride was an actress. It came down to Heather G. and Carmelo in the elimination room. Heather G. was eliminated, but informed by Buddy that "America loves you, and I love you.": Elimination: Heather G.
16	8	"Headbanging Bakers"	January 16, 2012	Carmelo & Megan
The bakers have to make a birthday cake for Mauro, the twist is that it has to fit the theme of his heavy-metal birthday. The second day, Buddy declared that two would leave as he was angry about both cakes looking so unprofessional. Neither team won due to flaws in both cakes. Marissa, Nadine and Megan's cake had structural problems with their guitar headpiece falling over destroying the cake. While Carmelo, Chad and Ryan's cake had detail issues, and did not even have "Happy Birthday Mauro" on the cake, making Buddy wonder who the cake was for. Marissa and Ryan were both safe off the start. Carmelo was sent to the box truck first, leaving Chad, Nadine and Megan in the elimination room. Buddy asked Chad to be as strong as he is in elimination in the actual challenges otherwise he'd be the next out. Finally Buddy chose Megan to be the second to the box truck, but told Nadine to prove to him why she belonged there.: Elimination: Carmelo & Megan
17	9	"Crown-Winning Cakes"	January 23, 2012	Chad
The bakers have to make a cake for Miss USA, Alyssa Campanella. She tells them a variety of her likes, and Buddy tells them to make a cake suited to her needs. At the four hour remaining mark, Buddy comes in and tells the competitors that they now have half the time, of only two hours. However, they would get a helper in the form of former team mates. Marissa was teamed up with Jasmine, Chad with Wesley, Nadine with Heather M., and Ryan with Carmelo. Alyssa spoke in good regards of Marissa and Nadine's cakes, but felt Ryan's cake represented her but only slightly, and lacked focus, while Chad's cake gave really only a representation of the pageant side but not her journey. Marissa and Nadine were told they move on to the finals, leaving Chad and Ryan in the bottom two. Buddy felt Chad did not live up to the challenge and was eliminated, although he did say his cake was "flawless".: Elimination: Chad
18	9A	"Finale Pre-Show"	January 30, 2012	N/A
This is a special episode that recaps the season up to this point, as well as provide a preview to the season finale that will follow. The special will also answer questions about the competition and its contestants, submitted by viewers. Clinton Kelly (of What Not to Wear) co-hosts the special with Buddy.
19	10	"…And the Winner Is?"	January 30, 2012	(1) Ryan, (2) Nadine
The first challenge requires the final three bakers to take over Carlo's Bakery and sell their own cookies, cakes, pies and Italian pastries to Carlo's customers. To keep track, each of the different items is worth a certain number of tickets. Each of the bakers receives a team of three, a sister, a baker and an assistant. At the end of the challenge, Nadine is announced as the winner, with Ryan being eliminated collecting the lowest number of tickets. The final challenge requires the final two to bake and design a cake that represents their American dream. They have the crew of Carlo's Bakery to help them due to the early time of 2:30AM they have to start baking. They brought their cakes in front of Buddy, Mary and special guest Randy Fenoli of Say Yes to the Dress. Marissa was announced the winner of The Next Great Baker, Season 2.: Elimination: (1) Ryan, (2) Nadine; The Next Great Baker: Marissa

== Production notes ==
Shortly after Wesley Durden was eliminated from the competition, he committed suicide on October 24, 2011. Following the telecast on December 19, 2011, when he was eliminated, the program gave the following on-screen tribute after his box truck sendoff: TLC extends its deepest condolences to the family, friends and colleagues of Sgt. Wesley Durden, who died October 24. He will be warmly remembered by the cast and crew of "Next Great Baker". TLC opted to delay the announcement of his death until after his elimination was telecast, as the network did not want his death to overshadow the competition.

At the start of the competition, Heather Grubb was 7.5 months into her pregnancy; because of this, reasonable accommodations were made so that the competition would not affect her pregnancy—such accommodations included wearing non-slip shoes instead of skates in "Bakers On Ice", and refraining from heavy lifting. Shortly before the finale's airdate of January 30, 2012, Heather gave birth to her daughter, which she introduced with her husband on the Finale Pre-Show.
