= Next Great Baker =

- Also known as: Cake Boss: Next Great Baker
- Presented by: Buddy Valastro
- Country of origin: United States
- Original language: English
- No. of seasons: 4
- No. of episodes: 41 (list of episodes)

Production
- Running time: 42 minutes

Original release
- Network: TLC
- Release: December 6, 2010 – August 19, 2014

Related
- Cake Boss; Kitchen Boss; Ultimate Cake Off

Next Great Baker (also known as Cake Boss: Next Great Baker) is an American television series that airs on TLC, hosted by Buddy Valastro, the star of his own reality series, Cake Boss. The show features contestants participating in challenges that test their edible art baking and decorating skills. Each week, a contestant will be eliminated; the last contestant standing will win a grand prize package that varies by season. Other prizes for winning a challenge or the week's competition are also offered during the series.

== Gameplay ==
Each round has three stages:

1. Baker's challenge: Each contestant has to meet a challenge set by Buddy the Cake Boss, such as making a pastry, baking a cake or, as in the first-season finale, filling buckets of grease. The winner of this challenge receives a special bonus, revealed after the challenge.
2. Elimination challenge: Each contestant has a set amount of time over two days — usually three hours on the first day and the remaining time on the second — to make a cake to specifications set by Buddy.
3. Final elimination: Buddy and the judges (the judge from the Baker's challenge and a client) decide which three cakes are the best and which two cakes that are the worst. After the decisions are made, the contestants (who were waiting in the bakers' lounge) enter the judging room. Contestants determined "safe" are then dismissed. Then, the three contestants with the best cakes are announced, with the one with the best cake in the challenge singled out. The remaining contestants have the worst cakes in the challenge; one of these will be told to leave the competition, transported away by Danny (an employee of Carlo's Bakery and Buddy's close friend) inside a box truck marked "Not the Next Great Baker".

== Episodes ==
Season	Episodes	Originally released	
Season	Episodes	First released	Last released
1	8	December 6, 2010	January 24, 2011
2	11	November 28, 2011	January 30, 2012
3	12	November 26, 2012	February 11, 2013
4	10	June 24, 2014	August 19, 2014

=== Season 1 ===
The first season of Next Great Baker was taped inside a special kitchen studio set up at the Hudson County Community College Culinary Arts Institute in Jersey City, New Jersey, and was televised from December 6, 2010 to January 24, 2011 on TLC. Dana Herbert, the last contestant standing out of a field of ten contestants, won $50,000 cash, a Chevrolet Cruze and an apprenticeship at Carlo's Bake Shop in Hoboken, New Jersey. Following his win, Dana was featured in some episodes of Cake Boss, but he had had his own bakery before his appearance on the show.

=== Season 2 ===
The second season of Next Great Baker was set at the new Carlo's Bakery facility at Lackawanna Center in Jersey City, and was televised from November 28, 2011 to January 30, 2012 on TLC. Marissa Lopez, the last contestant standing out of a field of 13 contestants, won $100,000 cash and a four-page spread in Brides magazine, along with an opportunity to work beside Buddy in the bakery. As of 2020, she is the manager of Carlo's Bakery Ridgewood, New Jersey.

=== Season 3 ===
Season 3 premiered on Monday, November 26, 2012. 13 contestants compete for $100,000, a spread in redbook magazine and to work with Buddy. The winner was Ashley Holt. She now owns her own bakery called Sugar Monster. She previously worked at Buddy's bakery and appears on Buddy's other show, Cake Boss from Season 5. She announced her withdrawal from the bakery on Season 6. (Ep. 28: Up, Up and Away)

=== Season 4 ===
Season 4 premiered on Tuesday, June 24, 2014. This season, contestants competed in pairs. Ten pairs total vied for a $100,000 grand prize and an opportunity to work for Buddy Valastro at the new Carlo's Bakery at Las Vegas's The Venetian. Chocolatier Jacques Torres and Magnolia Bakery chief Bobbie Lloyd were permanent judges for season four alongside Buddy. Co-workers Al Watson and Lia Weber were the winners.

== Versions ==
Country/Region	Name	Network(s)	Winners
Arab World	Arab Baker حلواني العرب	Dubai TV; MBC 1 SBC TV; Abu Dhabi TV	Season 1, 2004: Iraq: Yousef Amer; Season 2, 2008: Egypt: Chef Kadry; Season 3, 2019: Lebanon: Michel Assaf; Season 4,2020: Egypt: Ahmed Selim; Season 5,2021: Egypt: Massoud El Sherbini; Season 6,2023: Kuwait: Mohamed Hassan
Brazil	Batalha dos Confeiteiros; Battle of the Bakers	RecordTV; Discovery Home & Health	Season 1, 2015: Rick Zavala; Season 2, 2018: Iara Cavalcanti
Brazil	Batalha dos Cozinheiros; Battle of the Cooks	RecordTV; Discovery Home & Health	Season 1, 2016: André Neto & Adelino Bilhalva
Latin America (Except Brazil)	El desafío de Buddy: Latinoamérica; Buddy's Challenge: Latin America	Discovery Home & Health	Season 1, 2014: Catalina Moroni; Season 2, 2015: Daniela Galarza; Season 3, 2016: Current season
United States	Next Great Baker	TLC	Season 1, 2010: Dana Herbert; Season 2, 2011: Marissa Lopez; Season 3, 2012: Ashley Holt; Season 4, 2014: Al Watson & Lia Weber
