= Cake Boss =

American reality television series (2009–2020)

- Genre: Reality
- Presented by: Buddy Valastro
- Opening theme: "Sugar, Sugar"
- Country of origin: United States
- Original language: English
- No. of seasons: 10
- No. of episodes: 257 (list of episodes)

Production
- Executive producers: Scott Feeley; Jim Berger; Buddy Valastro; Art Edwards
- Producers: Laney McVicker; Casey Bauer
- Editors: David T McCurley; Patrick Bryant; Christopher Schultz; David Miers; Stacey Martins
- Running time: 22 minutes 42 minutes (specials)
- Production companies: High Noon Entertainment; Cakehouse Media

Original release
- Network: TLC (2009–17); Discovery Family (2019–20)
- Release: April 19, 2009 – December 12, 2020

Related
- Next Great Baker; Kitchen Boss; Bake You Rich; Bakery Boss

Cake Boss is an American reality television series that originally aired on the cable television network TLC. The series premiered on April 19, 2009, and spawned multiple spin-offs and successor series: Next Great Baker, Kitchen Boss, Bake You Rich, and Bakery Boss.

On January 26, 2015, Cake Boss was renewed for two additional seasons, which aired on TLC until 2017. Season 9 premiered on May 18, 2019, with the show moving to TLC's sister network, Discovery Family. The show officially ended on December 12, 2020.

== Plot ==
The show follows the operations of Carlo's Bake Shop, an Italian-American family-owned business in Hoboken, New Jersey owned and operated by siblings Buddy Valastro (to whom the series' title refers), Lisa Valastro, Maddalena Castano, Grace Faugno and Mary Sciarrone. The show focuses on how they make their edible art cakes and the interpersonal relationships among the various family members and other employees who work at the shop.

== Cast ==
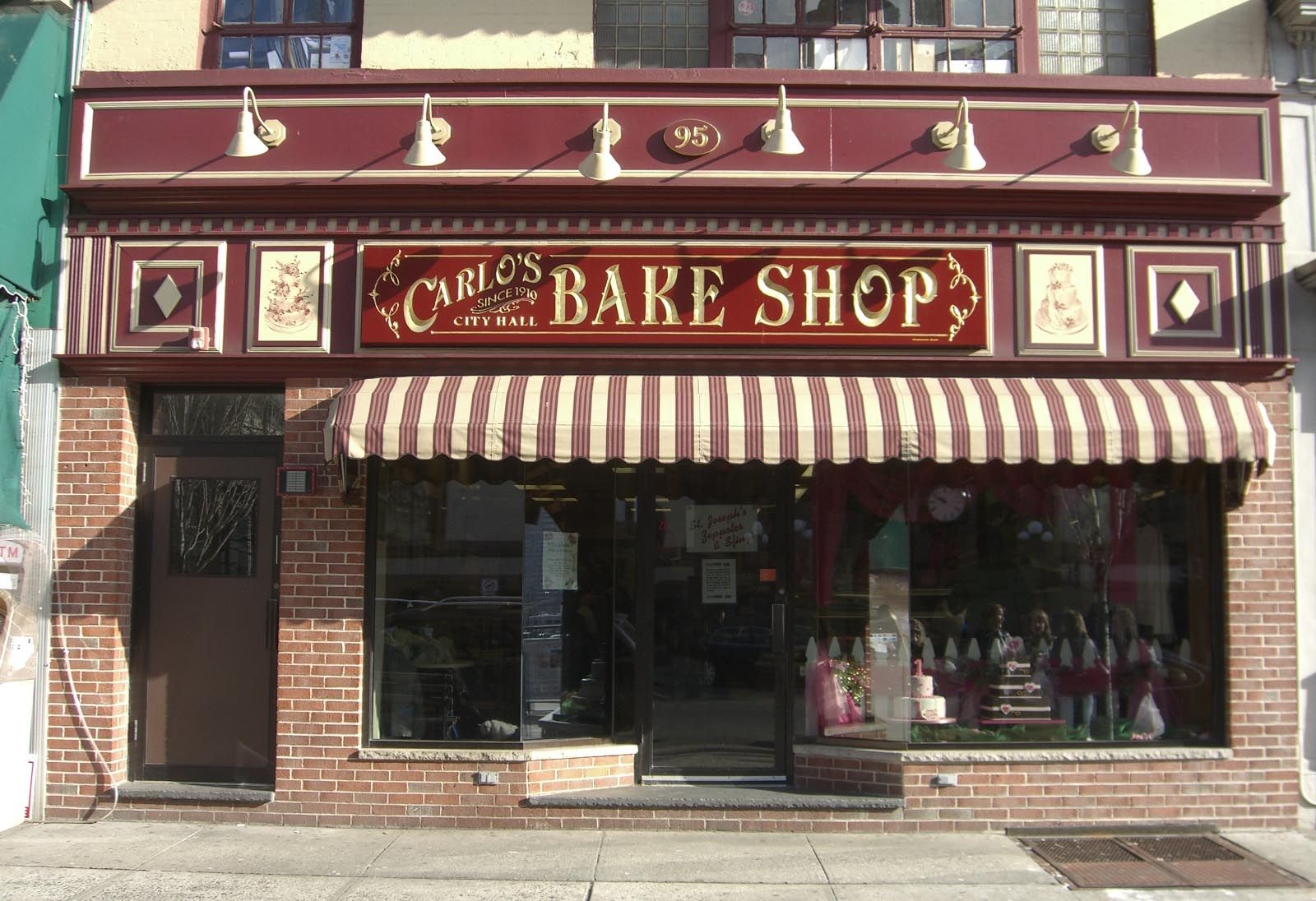
Carlo's Bake Shop in Hoboken, New Jersey, where the series is filmed.

- Bartolo "Buddy" Valastro Jr. (born March 3, 1977) – The star of the show, who has worked at the bakery since age 17 in 1994. He is the only son and the youngest child of Bartolo "Buddy" Sr. and Mary Valastro. He grew up in Little Ferry, New Jersey. He is married to Elisabetta "Lisa" Valastro (née Belgiovine) with whom he has four children: Sofia, Bartolo "Buddy" III, Marco, and Carlo. In 2012, as a result of the attention that the series brought to Hoboken, New Jersey, the Hudson Reporter named him as an honorable mention in its list of Hudson County's 50 most influential people. He was inducted into the New Jersey Hall of Fame in 2017.
- Mauro Castano (born August 18, 1963) – pastry chef and Buddy's right-hand man. He is married to Buddy's second-oldest sister, Maddalena. He was born in Milan, and left Italy when he was 12. He arrived in the USA on February 15, 1976. His father is from Bernalda, Basilicata and his mother from near Reggio Emilia, Emilia Romagna. On September 16, 1989, he had his first date with Maddalena (her father orchestrated all), and in October 1991 they married.
- Joseph "Joey" Faugno (born October 10, 1967) – The shop's head baker. He is married to Buddy's oldest sister, Grace. They have two children: Robert and Bartolina.
- Frank "Frankie" Amato Jr. (born August 29, 1978) – cake decorator. He is Buddy's second cousin and godfather to his son Marco, with two children of his own.
- Danny Dragone – a multipurpose employee who has worked at the bakery since before Buddy was born. He is a close family friend, and his daughter, Tatiana, works at the bakery. He is nicknamed "the mule" for his versatility.
- Grace Faugno (née Valastro) – (born June 30, 1966) Buddy's oldest sister. She works the front counter and in later season in the decoration and delivery from special orders. She is married to Joey Faugno, the shop's head baker. They have two children: Robert and Bartolina.
- Maddalena Castano (née Valastro) (born August 15, 1967) – manages the front counter. She is married to Mauro. They have three children: Dominique, Bartolo "Buddy", and Mary.
- Mary Sciarrone (née Valastro) (born September 30, 1969) – Cake Consultant and Buddy's third-oldest sister. She is married with two children: Joseph and Lucia. In the fifth-season episode Trash, Twirls & Tough Love ", she was fired because of multiple incidents involving her making inappropriate statements. Mary was rehired as a cake consultant a few weeks after being fired. She returned to full-time work at the bakery in the episode "Silly Seuss & Surprise!".
- Lisa Valastro (born December 31, 1974) – Buddy's youngest sister. Manages the storefront and sometimes handles billing. She has three kids Teresa "Tessy" Colegrove, John Colegrove and Isabella Valastro. Early in the show's run she was married to baker Remigio "Remy" Gonzalez, who left the show when he was arrested on sexual assault charges. The birth of their daughter, Isabella, was chronicled in the third-season episode "Mother's Day, Mama and Mom-to-Be."
- Elisabetta "Lisa" Valastro (née Belgiovine) (born March 9, 1979) – Buddy's wife. They have four kids, Sofia Valastro, Carlo Valastro, Marco Valastro and Buddy Valastro, III. Her parents, Gloria Tammacco and Mauro Belgiovine, who are seen in the show, are from Molfetta, Puglia.
- Maurizio Belgiovine – delivery boy and structure builder. He is Buddy's brother-in-law and a graduate of Rutgers Business School.
- Ralph Attanasia III (born September 6, 1984) – bakery sculptor.
- Marissa Lopez – Buddy's intern (winner of Season 2 of Next Great Baker), later becoming manager of Carlo's Bakery's new location in Ridgewood, New Jersey.
- Mary Valastro Piccinch – (April 17, 1948 – June 22, 2017) Buddy's mother. A show regular until her 2010 retirement; still appeared on the show on occasion. Announced in 2012 that she was diagnosed with ALS. The family's struggle and reaction was documented in the Season 5 episode, "A Bittersweet Homecoming," on July 23, 2012. Mary died on June 22, 2017, after a five-year battle with ALS. Her second husband was Sergio Piccinch.
- Remigio "Remy" Gonzalez – Buddy's former left-hand man and the husband of Buddy's sister, Lisa. (They have since divorced.) Remy's first and only child, daughter Isabella, was born on the Cake Boss episode "Mother's Day, Mama and Mom-to-Be." He left the show after being arrested for alleged sexual assault in August 2010. In May 2012 he was sentenced to nine years in state prison after pleading guilty to sexually assaulting a 13-year-old girl. It was expected that he would be deported to his home country, Mexico, following his release. He was released from prison on April 10, 2018.
- Salvatore "Sal" Picinich (1947 – January 30, 2011) worked at the bakery from 1964 and was one of Buddy's most trusted employees. Picinich stopped appearing on the show at the end of 2009, when he began battling cancer, but returned in the summer of 2010 to accept the Employee of the Century Award on the occasion of the bakery's 100th anniversary. He died on January 30, 2011.
- Kevin "Stretch" Krand – a delivery boy who left the shop to continue his education.
- Tony "Tone-Tone" Albanese – Buddy's second intern.
- Daniella Storzillo – a sculptor and decorator at Carlo's. She left to work as a real estate sales associate.
- Stephanie "Sunshine" Fernandez – top decorator at Carlo's. She was the first female employee who did not work with sales, as stated by Buddy Valastro. She left for an opportunity to finish nursing school nine months earlier. Before leaving to become a nurse, she appeared on the show's spinoff, Next Great Baker, where she was chosen by the season 2 winner, Marissa Lopez, to help her build her American Dream cake.
- Dana Herbert – winner of Season 1 of Next Great Baker
- Ashley Holt – winner of Season 3 of Next Great Baker
- Paul Conti – bakery employee (former contestant of Season 3 of Next Great Baker); was only in a couple of episodes because he lost his house and his job due to Hurricane Sandy. He eventually got a job working for a baking supply company.
- Anthony "Cousin Anthony" Bellifemine – baker and former delivery boy, Bellifemine left unexpectedly at the end of season 6 (Ep. 28: Up, Up and Away).
- Chad Durkin – Bakery employee (former contestant of Season 3 of Next Great Baker, hired by Buddy for his pastry skills (seasons 7–8).

== Reception ==
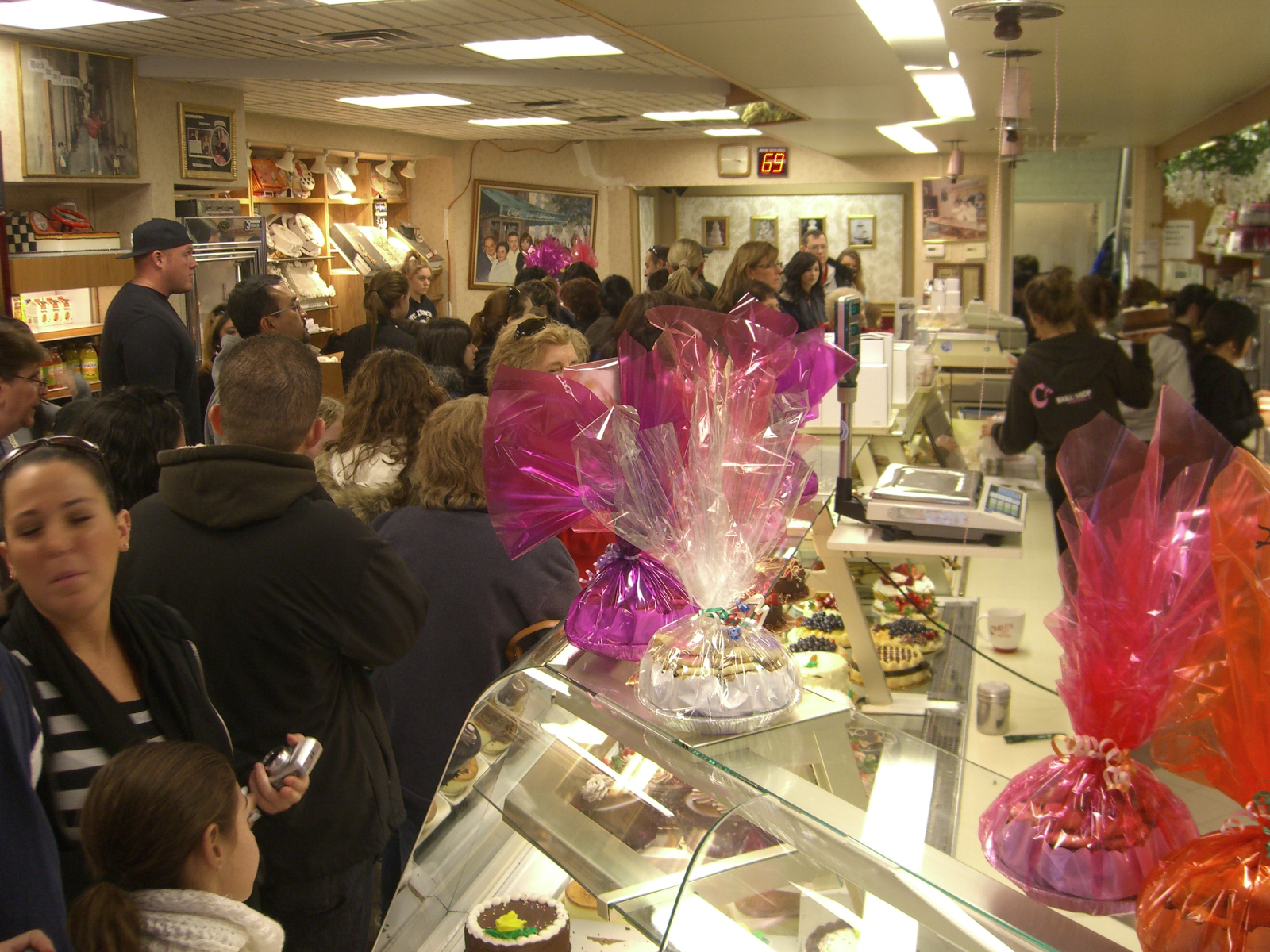
The interior of Carlo's Bake Shop on a busy holiday.

The popularity of the show resulted in increased business for Carlo's Bake Shop, and increased tourism to the Hoboken area. Due to the popularity, Carlo's Bake Shop became a tourist attraction, with lines to enter the bakery often extending down the block and around the corner. In 2010, Hoboken renamed the corner of Washington Street and Newark Street to "Carlo's Bakery Way" in honor of the bakery's centennial.

Season one averaged 2.3 million viewers while season two averaged 1.8 million viewers. In 2016, a New York Times study of the 50 TV shows with the most Facebook Likes found that Cake Boss's "audience is generally not urban; in fact, one hot spot is Appalachia".

== Tie-ins and spinoffs ==
On November 2, 2010, Buddy Valastro's book, Cake Boss: Stories and Recipes from Mia Famiglia, which is based on the series, was released. Published by Atria Books (a division of Simon & Schuster) in celebration of the 100th anniversary of Carlo's Bake Shop, the book features the history and stories of Valastro's family and the bake shop, along with recipes.

Valastro's second book, Baking with the Cake Boss: 100 of Buddy's Best Recipes and Decorating Secrets, is a cookbook, also published by Atria Books, released November 1, 2011 and featuring Valastro's cake, pastry and decorating recipes.

The success of Cake Boss has led to a spin-off competition series hosted by Valastro, Next Great Baker, in which people compete to win a top cash prize, other valuable prizes, and an apprenticeship at Carlo's Bakery. The program's first season was seen on TLC December 6, 2010 through January 24, 2011, with a second season televised November 28, 2011 to January 30, 2012. The competition's third season premiered on Monday, November 26, 2012.

Another spinoff series, Kitchen Boss, debuted on January 25, 2011. It featured Valastro presenting his family's recipes, as well as special guests, including members of his own family.

A backdoor pilot special, Bakery Boss, debuted on May 27, 2013. The special features Valastro traveling to a struggling bakery, Friendly Bake Shop in Frankfort, New York, and helping them reverse their fortunes, using a format similar to Kitchen Nightmares. The program returned to TLC as a series on December 2, 2013, and was later renamed Buddy's Bakery Rescue. Buddy's intern, Ashley Holt, served as Culinary Producer for the series. Cake Boss also has a product line that features baking pans and decorating accessories.

In October 2023, it was announced by Valastro that he would host a new television show, Buddy Valastro's Cake Dynasty, airing on A&E. The new series also includes his four children, who Valastro says are now old enough to be a part of the show. The show premiered on November 11, 2023.

== Episodes ==
Season	Episodes	Originally released		
Season	Episodes	First released	Last released	Network
1	13	April 19, 2009	August 17, 2009	TLC
2	19	October 26, 2009	February 22, 2010	TLC
3	25	May 31, 2010	November 29, 2010	TLC
4	41	January 31, 2011	January 30, 2012	TLC
5	30	May 28, 2012	February 18, 2013	TLC
6	28	May 27, 2013	February 24, 2014	TLC
7	21	September 8, 2015	November 24, 2015	TLC
8	32	August 23, 2016	December 2, 2017	TLC
9	38	May 18, 2019	April 11, 2020	Discovery Family
10	10	October 10, 2020	December 12, 2020	Discovery Family

== Controversies ==
In July 2010, Masters Software, Inc., of Cedar Park, Texas, obtained a preliminary injunction forbidding TLC from calling its show "Cake Boss". Since 2006, the company has operated the domain name cakeboss.com, and since 2007, it has sold a bakery management program called CakeBoss. The suit claims that Discovery Communications infringes on its trademark by causing confusion among customers and vendors. In October 2010, Masters Software and Discovery Communications reached a settlement, the details of which are not public.

On June 11, 2012, transgender celebrity Carmen Carrera appeared in a Cake Boss episode, "Bar Mitzvah, Beads and Oh Baby!", in which she unknowingly participated in a prank involving Cousin Anthony, who was set up with a date with Carrera. The punchline of the prank had Buddy tell Anthony that Carrera is transgender. Carrera agreed to participate in the prank on the program in part to promote equality for the transgender community saying, "I'm totally cool with a prank like this, I, you know as long as it's in good fun." Following the airing of the program, Carrera was upset by an interview portion of the program where Buddy said, "And I tell him...that's a man, baby!" Carrera made a statement saying, "I made it VERY clear to the producers on how to use the correct wording before agreeing to filming this but instead they chose to poke fun and be disrespectful. That's not what I'm about! ... I may not have been born a woman, but I'm NOT a man... After taking this journey it's not fair at all to be lied to by the producers." Buddy Valastro apologized for the incident, saying, "I owe an apology to the entire LGBT community. It was absolutely not my intention to upset or offend her, or anyone within the community, and I was wrong to use the words I did. I am a supporter of gay rights and equality, and while I regret this situation and my choice of words, I am thankful to have received this feedback and the opportunity to learn from this mistake. I hope that Carmen accepts my sincere regrets." The following day, on June 12, 2012, TLC announced that "Bar Mitzvah, Beads and Oh Baby!" had been pulled from rotation indefinitely, with plans to re-edit the episode. The episode has since re-aired on July 23, 2012, but with the offending scene re-edited.

== In popular culture ==
Comedian Paul F. Tompkins plays a parody of Cake Boss host Buddy Valastro on the Comedy Bang Bang podcast and IFC TV show.

== See also ==
- Ace of Cakes – similar program on Food Network
- Food Network Challenge – series where Buddy Valastro was a frequent contestant
- Batalha dos Confeiteiros – Brazilian series where Buddy Valastro is host
