= Batalha dos Confeiteiros =

- Genre: Cooking
- Based on: Next Great Baker
- Written by: Bruna Barbosa; Fernando Americo; Nícolas Vargas; Renata Motta
- Directed by: Carla Barros
- Creative director: Eduardo Gaspar
- Presented by: Buddy Valastro
- Narrated by: Wendel Bezerra
- Opening theme: In the Hall of the Mountain King
- Country of origin: Brazil
- Original language: Portuguese
- No. of seasons: 2
- No. of episodes: 24

Production
- Executive producers: Buddy Valastro; Art Edwards
- Producers: Camila Nascimento; Carla Aguiar; Diego Maldonado
- Editors: Danilo Ortiz; Felipe Falcade; Maria Claudia; Raquel Fontenele
- Camera setup: Multiple-camera
- Running time: 60 minutes

Original release
- Network: RecordTV; Discovery Home & Health
- Release: 30 September 2015 – 11 July 2018

Related
- Next Great Baker

Batalha dos Confeiteiros (English: Battle of the Bakers) is a Brazilian television series based on Next Great Baker, hosted by Buddy Valastro, the star of his own reality series, Cake Boss. The series premiered Wednesday, 30 September 2015 at 10:30 p.m. on RecordTV.

The show features contestants participating in challenges that test their edible art baking and decorating skills. Each week, a contestant will be eliminated; the last contestant standing will win a grand prize package that varies by season. Other prizes for winning a challenge or the week's competition are also offered during the series.

== Gameplay ==
Each round has three stages:

1. Baker's challenge: Each contestant has to meet a challenge set by Buddy the Cake Boss, such as making a pastry, baking a cake or, as in the first season finale, filling buckets of grease. The winner of this challenge receives a special bonus, revealed after the challenge.
2. Elimination challenge: Each contestant has a set amount of time over two days — usually three hours on the first day and the remaining time on the second — to make a cake to specifications set by Buddy.
3. Final elimination: Buddy and the judges (the judge from the Baker's challenge and a client) decide which three cakes are the best and which two cakes that are the worst. After the decisions are made, the contestants (who were waiting in the bakers' lounge) enter the judging room. Contestants determined "safe" are then dismissed. Then, the three contestants with the best cakes are announced, with the one with the best cake in the challenge singled out. The remaining contestants have the worst cakes in the challenge; one of these will be told to leave the competition, transported away by Danny (an employee of Carlo's Bakery and Buddy's close friend) inside a box truck marked "Not the Next Great Baker".

== Contestants ==
Fourteen contestants competed during the series:

Contestant	Age	Hometown
Alex Alvino	41	Nova Iguaçu
Bruna Monari	34	São Paulo
Candelaria Forero	30	Medellín, Colombia
Chico Zinneck	32	São Paulo
Gustavo Henrique	23	Timbaúba
Ju Andreazi	32	Santo André
Manu Monteiro	28	Rio de Janeiro
Manuka	39	São Paulo
Marcia Acácio	41	Fortaleza
Mari Corali	34	São Paulo
Rick Zavala	43	Santos
Rodolfo Araújo	37	Salvador
Rosangela Marinho	57	Rio de Janeiro
Léo Vilela	29	São Paulo

== Contestant progress ==
Place	Contestant	Episode 1	Episode 2	Episode 3	Episode 4	Episode 5	Episode 6	Episode 7	Episode 8	Episode 9	Episode 10	Episode 11
	Baker's challenge winner(s)	Chico	Rosangela	Ju & Alex	Ju & Manu	Marcia	Gustavo	Candelaria	Gustavo	Rick	Marcia	None
1	Rick	WIN	WIN	WIN	WIN	HIGH	LOW	IN	WIN	WIN	IN	WINNER
2	Marcia	IN	IN	WIN	IN	HIGH	WIN	WIN	LOW	WIN	WIN	RUNNER-UP
3	Chico	WIN	WIN	HIGH	IN	HIGH	LOW	WIN	WIN	LOW	THIRD	
4	Manu	LOW	WIN	LOW	IN	WIN	WIN	LOW	WIN	OUT		
5	Candelaria	WIN	IN	LOW	IN	LOW	WIN	LOW	OUT			
6	Gustavo	WIN	IN	HIGH	HIGH	WIN	LOW	WIN	OUT			
7	Rosangela	IN	IN	LOW	LOW	WIN	WIN	OUT				
8	Alex	IN	WIN	HIGH	LOW	LOW	OUT					
9	Ju	LOW	IN	WIN	HIGH	OUT						
10	Mari	LOW	WIN	LOW	OUT							
11	Rodolfo	LOW	LOW	OUT								
12	Vilela	LOW	WIN	OUT								
13	Bruna	LOW	OUT									
14	Manuka	OUT										

Key

Winner	Runner-up	Third place
Elimination challenge winner	Elimination challenge top entire	Advanced
Saved first	Saved last	Eliminated

== Ratings and reception ==
=== Brazilian ratings ===
All numbers are in points and provided by IBOPE.

Episode	Air Date	Viewers (in points)	Rank Timeslot	Source
Episode 1	30 September 2015	12.8	2	
Episode 2	7 October 2015	09.8	2	
Episode 3	14 October 2015	13.2	2	
Episode 4	21 October 2015	11.4	2	
Episode 5	28 October 2015	12.1	2	
Episode 6	4 November 2015	11.3	2	
Episode 7	11 November 2015	13.2	2	
Episode 8	18 November 2015	10.9	2	
Episode 9	25 November 2015	11.2	2	
Episode 10	2 December 2015	09.3	2	
Episode 11	9 December 2015	11.5	2	
