= Next Great Baker season 1 =

Next Great Baker
- Season 1
- No. of episodes: 8

Release
- Original network: TLC
- Original release: December 6, 2010 – January 24, 2011

Season chronology
- Next → Season 2

The first season of Next Great Baker was televised from December 6, 2010, to January 24, 2011, on TLC. During this season, the last contestant standing would win $50,000 cash, a Chevrolet Cruze and an apprenticeship at Buddy's bakery, Carlo's Bake Shop in Hoboken, New Jersey.

== Show opening ==
Each episode opens with the contestants engaged in a foodfight, with each contestant introduced. Near the end, Buddy enters the kitchen from his office, saying "This is gonna get ugly!", only to be clobbered in the face by a piece of cake.

Portions of the opening were also used in promos for the series; the early promos leading up to its premiere also included The Archies' Sugar, Sugar in the background.

== Contestants ==
Ten chefs competed in the competition.

Contestant	Age	Occupation	Hometown
Brian Stevens	37	Owner of Crazy Cakes Inc.; Senior Artist for Sony Online Entertainment	Austin, Texas
Corina Elgart	32	Owner of "taste", a specialty cake shop in Syosset, New York	Huntington, New York
Dana Herbert	34	Owner and Pastry Chef of Desserts By Dana; Head Chef of the Delaware River and Bay Authority	Bear, Delaware
Greggy Soriano	26	Wedding Cake Designer	Jersey City, New Jersey
Jay Qualls	42	President and Cake Designer of Maples Wedding Cakes	Nashville, Tennessee
Joseph "Joe" Glaser	47	Pastry Chef/Owner, La Bella Torte	Brooklyn, New York
Johanna Lyons	29	Co-owner, Sugar Plum Bakery	Hanson, Massachusetts
Kendra Jordan	31	Sixth Grade English Teacher	Emporia, Virginia
Megan Rountree	23	Owner of Legacy Cakes	Keller, Texas
Pamela Ahn	29	Electrical Engineer; Owner of PamCakes	Washington, DC

== Contestant progress ==
Place	Contestant	Episode 1	Episode 2	Episode 3	Episode 4	Episode 5	Episode 6	Episode 7	Episode 8	
	Baker's challenge winner(s)	Joe	Megan	Corina; Johanna; Megan; Pamela	Megan	Jay	Jay	-	Dana	
1	Dana	IN	HIGH	WIN	LOW	WIN	WIN	WIN	WIN	WINNER
2	Megan	HIGH	WIN	LOW	IN	LOW	LOW	IN	LOW	RUNNER-UP
3	Corina	IN	LOW	LOW	LOW	WIN	LOW	LOW	THIRD	
4	Brian	IN	IN	WIN	LOW	WIN	WIN	OUT		
4	Jay	IN	HIGH	WIN	LOW	LOW	WIN	OUT		
6	Joe	LOW	WD				OUT (Note: Joe was invited back into the contest, but was eliminated the same week.)			
7	Greggy	WIN	IN	WIN	LOW	OUT				
8	Pamela	LOW	IN	LOW	OUT					
9	Johanna	HIGH	LOW	OUT						
10	Kendra	OUT								

(WINNER) This baker won the competition.
(RUNNER-UP) This baker was the runner-up of the competition.
(THIRD) This baker placed third overall in the competition.
(WIN) The baker(s) won the challenge.
(HIGH) The baker(s) had one of the best cakes for that challenge, but did not win.
(IN) The baker(s) advanced to the next week.
(LOW) The baker(s) was/were a part of the team who lost, but was not the last to move on.
(LOW) The baker(s) had the worst cake of those who advanced, and was/were the last to move on.
(OUT) The baker(s) was/were eliminated.
(WD) The baker(s) voluntarily withdrew from the competition

== Episode guide ==
No. overall	No. in season	Title	Original release date	Contestant eliminated
1	1	"Celebrate Good Times, C'mon"	December 6, 2010	Kendra
Baker's challenge: For the first Baker's Challenge, each contestant has two hours to make a baked dessert good of their choosing. Buddy and his brother in law, Mauro, are judges. Joe has won this challenge for his rosemary olive oil cake; for this, he was awarded immunity from elimination.; Elimination challenge: Each contestant has nine hours total to make a cake celebrating a holiday or moment of their choice. Buddy, Mauro and Buddy's sister, Mary, are judges. Pamela, in making her cake, left the ovens on after the kitchen closed after three hours, resulting in her cakes being burned to a hulking charcoal mass. Greggy's Sweet Sixteen cake won the first Elimination Challenge. Also among the top three were Johanna, for her Halloween cake; and Megan, for her cake celebrating her dog. Joe's cake, celebrating the Feast of Giglio, was singled out as the worst cake, which Buddy called the worst he has ever seen in his life; however, he was immune from elimination, and while Buddy did contemplate revoking the immunity, he kept to his word and not eliminated him. They then turn to the next two worst bakers – Kendra for her football cake (too simple and not done very well), and Pamela for her Chinese New Year's cake (has not been paying close attention to detail).; Elimination: Buddy decided that Kendra should leave.; Note: The initial telecast was 75 minutes in length; repeat telecasts of this episode are 60 minutes, with portions removed to fit the time slot. The descriptions above reflect the initial telecast.
2	2	"Do Not Pass "Go"!"	December 13, 2010	Joe
Baker's challenge: Each contestant has two hours to make a cupcake, using the type of cake given by a clue provided to them (such as a sponge for a sponge cake; a weight for a pound cake, etc.). Buddy and his brother in law, Joey, are judges. Megan has won this challenge for her devil's food cupcake, while Pamela is runner-up for her red velvet cupcake. Joe was the worst for his carrot cake cupcake, with Greggy's caramelized banana cupcake being the second worst.; Elimination challenge: Three teams of three contestants each has 11 hours total (three the first day; eight the next) to make a cake celebrating Monopoly's 75th Anniversary; afterward, each team has 15 minutes to transport their cakes to the judging room. Buddy, Joey and a representative from Hasbro are the judges. Megan, for winning the challenge, has first pick of the contestants (Dana and Jay), while Pamela has second pick (Greggy and Brian) and Joe has the remaining two contestants (Corina and Johanna). Megan and her team won the competition for their cake (despite misspelling "Illinois"); Pamela and her team was declared "okay" and "safe" (the most cardinal mistake being their treatment of the Monopoly logo). Joe and his team, Johanna and Corina, was deemed the worst, mainly for Joe's lack of direction and Corina threatening bodily harm on Joe for sinking the team.; Elimination: Joe, in giving his reason, stated that he would quit because Corina was a better decorator; Corina concurred, as Joe "dropped the ball and couldn't pull his weight." Buddy agreed, and honored Joe's resignation, ordering him to the box truck. Buddy then discusses with Corina that because of the incident she should go too, but considered her "safe", as she has a lot of potential.
3	3	"Tis The Season To Be Jolly!"	December 20, 2010	Johanna
Baker's challenge: The contestants are divided into two teams of four, boys vs. girls. Each team must construct a three-layered Christmas cake, similar to the example made by Buddy (who made his cake in five minutes). The team that finishes first wins. The girls finished theirs first, taking 34 minutes to complete. However, there is no reward for winning.; Elimination challenge: For an American Cancer Society fund-raiser at the college, the same teams have eleven hours total to make a Christmas cake at least three feet tall. In addition, they must also make an Italian dinner for the attendees. The college's dean of students will judge the cakes, while Ultimate Cake Off host George Duran (here as spokesperson for Hunt's) judge the dinners. The boys won in both categories. The members on that team were also unanimous in their decision that Dana was the best member, for his efforts on the cake and the dinner; for that, he won $10,000, which he can either keep himself or distribute in any way he wishes. Dana chose to give himself and each team member $2500.; Elimination: The girls lost the challenge, as the cake design was a victim of gravity, and the dinner was a little dry. The girls decide who should leave – Corina chose Pamela, while the others chose Johanna, who was at fault for creating the cake, not knowing that it would not be structurally sound. Buddy agreed, and sent Johanna to the box truck.
4	4	"It's Dyn-O-Mite!"	December 27, 2010	Pamela
Baker's challenge: Each contestant must perfectly crack open two dozen eggs, make a perfect pie shell and make a flower out of modeling chocolate; the one to finish first wins. Megan won this challenge; for that, she gets immunity from elimination, as well as first pick of the contestants for her team – she chose Jay, Dana and Brian. However, she must join the team that has the leftover team members – Greggy, Pamela and Corina.; Elimination challenge: Each team has eleven hours – four hours the first day and seven hours the next – to make a cake to celebrate the 20th anniversary of extreme fx, a special effects company; the cake must be at least three feet tall and contain pyrotechnics and special effects. During the course to the challenge, Brian burned his hand when a cup containing grain alcohol had a leak as it burned; also, Megan was taken to hospital when the airbrush engine fell on her ankle when she tripped on the cord. After each cake was made, they were transported to a field 45 minutes from the college, where Buddy, his cousin Frankie and representatives from extreme fx judge the cakes, based on their looks and their special effects. Jay, Dana and Brian's cake looked the best, as it was closer to the spirit of the company; however, the pyrotechnics on their cake was a dud, while the losing team's pyrotechnics only partially worked. As a result, no one won, and as a penalty, both cakes were blown up.; Elimination: Brian and Pamela were singled out as the worst team members on each team – Brian for failing at special effects again (having failed the first time in the first episode's Elimination Challenge), and Pamela for not being a team player. Buddy eventually sent Pamela to the box truck.
5	5	"3-2-1 Blast Off!"	January 3, 2011	Greggy
Baker's challenge: Each contestant has 30 minutes to make a fondant layer cake, complete with a bow made of fondant. Dana and Megan made the worst two cakes. Corina and Jay were singled out as the best, with Jay being the winner. They were then made team leaders for the Elimination Challenge.; Elimination challenge: Each team has eleven hours over two days to create an outer-space themed cake for the sixth birthday of Buddy's son, Buddy Jr. Buddy's sister Grace and his wife, Lisa, are also on hand to judge. Corina's team consisted of Corina, Dana, and Brian; Jay's team consisted of Jay, Megan, and Greggy. Brian as usual decided to go for a cake with some form of special effect again, which, surprisingly, worked. Jay wanted to make planet cakes with cereal treats and stack them. In the judging, Jay's cake tasted good, but lacked in artistic design (originally, they planned on including Earth, but when that fell apart, it was replaced with a cylinder representing space). For Corina's cake, the design – a moon with the a rocket, planets shooting out, and a spinning Buddy Jr. on top of the rocket – was impressive but the chocolate cake tasted awful, due to Dana forgetting to put in the high ratio shortening in the initial mix to keep it moist. Nevertheless, Corina's cake was judged the best.; Elimination: Jay and Megan determine that Greggy should go to the box truck for his failure in the cake construction. Buddy agreed.
6	6	"Here Comes The Bride!"	January 10, 2011	Joe
Baker's challenge: Each contestant has 45 minutes to decorate a model wedding cake with decorative piping. All contestants have done a great job, meaning that there were no worst contestants for this challenge; the best contestant was Jay, with Dana runner-up. For his team for the next challenge, Jay has chosen Megan and Corina, with Dana getting Brian. However, Buddy transferred Jay to Dana's team. In order to equal the teams out, Buddy has brought back Joe, who was eliminated earlier, as Buddy thought he was worthy of a second chance.; Elimination challenge: Each team has six hours to construct a wedding cake for a bride. Buddy's brother in law Joey, and the bride's wedding planner, will judge. At the end, the contestants take their cakes to the top of a building for a photo shoot, before the cakes were toppled off the ledge. Buddy then gave the contestants four hours to remake the cakes, in which the bride and groom would select which of THOSE cakes are the best. They determined that Joe, Corina and Megan's cake tasted best, but the design was amateurish and the cake leaned to one side; while Dana, Jay and Brian's cake looked more professional and had great taste (though Buddy didn't care for it himself). The bride and groom has chosen Dana, Jay and Brian's cake for their wedding.; Elimination: Buddy announced that two contestants would leave since the team did not work well together. Joe, Corina and Megan on the block for losing the challenge. However, he decided that only Joe would go to the box truck – again as he agreed with the girls that it was unfair to team them up with him.
7	7	"Pedal To The Metal"	January 17, 2011	Brian & Jay
Elimination challenge: The competition begins with the Elimination Challenge, in which each contestant has eight hours to make a cake based on the Chevrolet Cruze; in addition, the winner of the competition will win the car, along with the money and apprenticeship. Mauro and a representative of Chevrolet will join Buddy to judge. However, with one hour left, Buddy sized up the cakes, and felt that they were not of professional quality; at that point, Buddy had given the contestants 90 minutes to finish their cakes, as well as make their best baked good of their choice. Dana was chosen as the best in both categories, and advances to the finals. Megan and Corina had some flaws in their cakes and baked goods, but had some merits that enable them to advance as well.; Elimination: Brian's cake was all fondant and cereal treats and no cake (as the cake for the "road" was too big for the car), and Jay's cake was very subpar and amateurish, compared to his other cakes. For these reasons, they go to the box truck.
8	8	"The Big Finale!"	January 24, 2011	Corina (1) - Megan (2)
In this 90-minute episode, the competition shifts to Carlo's Bakery in Hoboken for the final week of competition.: Baker's challenge: Each contestant has one minute to clean out the bakery's grease trap; the contestant with the most grease cleaned out wins. Dana won this challenge.; Elimination challenge: During a 24-hour period beginning at 6 PM, each contestant must bake 400 cookies, 20 cakes, 20 pies, and 100 each of two different pastries, all of their choosing; as well as bake a cake that would celebrate the spirit of Hoboken. Each contestant will have four people working under their wing – a counter clerk, a baker a decorator & a sculptor – all employees of Carlo's Bakery. For winning the Baker's Challenge, Dana has first pick of the help. The baked goods must be finished and in the display case by opening time at 7 AM – at that time, the contestants have two hours to sell their goods, paid by the customers using tickets – five tickets for cakes and pies, one ticket for other baked goods, with each customer having ten tickets to spend. The contestants with the most and second-most tickets advance to the next stage. Megan and Dana had made extras, but Corina only made the minimum to be sold; she left Madeline all to herself to sell while Corina makes more, but was forced by Buddy to rejoin Madeline on the sales floor. After the two-hour sale ended, Dana had the most tickets, with Megan coming in second. Corina had the fewest tickets redeemed so she was eliminated and sent to the box truck.; Final stage: Following the last challenge, Megan and Dana have four hours to complete their Hoboken cakes, which they would show to a live audience on stage at the Stevens Institute of Technology auditorium in Hoboken, where they will be judged by Buddy, his mother Mary and the mayor of Hoboken, Dawn Zimmer. Mary likes Dana's cake best, though he used vanilla instead of the requested chocolate; Mayor Zimmer likes Megan's chocolate cake best. Nevertheless, in the end, Buddy chose Dana as The Next Great Baker; where, in a post-competition celebration at the bakery, he gave Dana a Carlos' Bakery jacket with his name on it and a bust-shaped cake of Dana's likeness.
