= Kitchen Boss =

- Presented by: Buddy Valastro
- Country of origin: United States
- Original language: English
- No. of seasons: 2
- No. of episodes: 80

Production
- Production locations: Taped at NEP Studios, New York City
- Running time: 30 minutes

Original release
- Network: TLC
- Release: January 25, 2011 – April 2, 2012

Related
- Cake Boss; Next Great Baker

Kitchen Boss is an American television series on TLC, hosted by Buddy Valastro, the star of Cake Boss. The weekday series premiered on January 25, 2011, and the second season launched on January 31, 2012.

Unlike the documentary series Cake Boss and the reality series Next Great Baker, Kitchen Boss is a studio-based cooking show where Valastro prepares Italian-American dishes using his family's recipes. Valastro is typically joined in the kitchen by family members and special guests.

== Episodes ==
=== Series overview ===
Season	Episodes	Originally released	
Season	Episodes	First released	Last released
1	40	January 25, 2011	March 29, 2011
2	40	January 31, 2012	April 2, 2012

=== Season 1 (2011) ===
No. overall	No. in season	Title	Original release date
1	1	"Date Night"	January 25, 2011
Buddy and his wife Lisa make a meal for two fitting for a date night. Tonight's meal is Chicken Sorrentino with Fusilli with a side of Lisa's Asparagus and chocolate dipped strawberries for dessert.
2	2	"Italian Street Food"	January 26, 2011
Buddy and his cousin Frankie remember the sights and food of Italian street fairs; they reminisce by cooking a staple of the street fairs -- Sausage and Pepper Sandwiches and Calzones and Zeppoles
3	3	"Old Family Favourites"	January 27, 2011
Auntie Anna cooks many of Buddy's best-loved dishes, but she's never shared her recipes with the Valastro family. She reveals her secrets, as she lets Buddy in on her homemade Manicotti and her Chicken with Vinegar Peppers recipes.
4	4	"Sicilian Soiree"	January 28, 2011
Buddy taps into his roots to prepare an authentic Sicilian menu that includes Pasta Alla Norma, Steak Pizzaiola, and Buddy's personal favorite, Granita Lemon.
5	5	"Mauro's Favorites"	February 1, 2011
Buddy's cooking up Pasta e Lenticchie, Bananas Foster and all of brother-in-law Mauro's favorites. Together, they'll share stories from the bakery, Mauro's Italian heritage, and the meals they've shared together over the years.
6	6	"Pasta Party"	February 2, 2011
Buddy and his sister Lisa love pasta! Together, they cook and reminisce about the homemade pasta their grandmothers used to make. On the menu are some of their favorites, homemade Potato Gnocchi with Mushroom Sauce, Rigatoni alla Vodka, and Baked Ziti.
7	7	"Go To Dishes"	February 3, 2011
Buddy prepares his three go-to recipes for last minute guests. Caponata Dip makes a delicious appetizer, followed by Spinach and Ricotta Ravioli and Buddy's quick and easy Roast Chicken.
8	8	"Sports Sunday"	February 4, 2011
The boys are taking over the kitchen! Buddy's brother-in-law Joey and Buddy's cousin Anthony get together to create the perfect guy's feast menu- Fried Calamari, Buddy's Famous Chicken Wings and Joey's Nachos.
9	9	"Pizza Night"	February 7, 2011
Buddy and Buddy's daughter Sophia get together to make some of their favorites like Margarita Pizza, Prociutto and Arugula Pizza, Four Cheese Pizza and Sophia's Sweet Pizza.
10	10	"Italian Cooking"	February 8, 2011
Buddy is teaching the basics! Master the dishes like Spaghetti Marinara, a simple Green Salad with Italian Vinaigrette, and Perfect Italian Chicken Cutlet. And Buddy's sister Grace stops by to learn how to make a classic Italian custard - Zabaglione.
11	11	"Stuffed Stuff"	February 9, 2011
Buddy and his good friend and Hoboken chef, Tony, cook up their favorite Italian comfort food, stuffed stuff! Watch as Buddy makes Arancini alla Buddy, Stuffed Artichokes and Stuffed Peppers.
12	12	"Uncle Cozmo's Favourites"	February 10, 2011
Auntie Anna is one of the best cooks in the Valastro family, just ask her husband, Cosmo! Buddy invites Auntie Anna and Uncle Cosmo to share their favorite family recipes like Shrimp Scampi, Tortellini Soup with Short Ribs and Affogatto.
13	13	"Farmers Market Fun"	February 11, 2011
New Jersey's the garden state, and Buddy is making the best vegetable dishes in town! Get ready for Grandma Maddalena's Eggplant Parmesan, Zucchini and Yellow Squash Casserole and Buddy's Swiss Chard.
14	14	"Valentines Day"	February 14, 2011
It's Valentines Day, and to celebrate Buddy is making Lisa a special romantic dinner. Food is the way to a woman's heart with dishes like King Crab Legs with Garlic Butter, Roasted Prime Rib and Valentine's Vanilla Cupcakes.
15	15	"Danny's Favorites"	February 15, 2011
Danny was working at Carlo's Bakery long before Buddy was even born. He's like family! And today, Buddy is cooking up all of Danny's favorites--Linguini with Shrimp and Oven Roasted Tomato, Pizza Bread and Baked Sausages with Savory Onions.
16	16	"Sunday Dinner"	February 17, 2011
Have Sunday dinner with the Valastro family without leaving your kitchen! Buddy is making a traditional Italian Sunday dinner with a little help from his Aunt Marie. On the menu tonight- Buddy's Sunday Gravy and Grissini with Prosciutto and Blue Cheese.
17	17	"Buddy's Dream Meal"	February 18, 2011
Buddy is making his favorite meal of all time! It doesn't get any better than this-- Fettucine Alfredo Buddy Style, Veal Saltimbocca and Buddy's favorite dessert, Tiramisu.
18	18	"Family Dinner"	February 22, 2011
Buddy and his sister Mary cook up some family-friendly dishes, starting with a Tomato and Bean Bruschetta. Then continue with Grandma Maddalena's Sausage Lasagna, a family favorite. They finish off the menu with a deliciously sinful Banana Cream Pie.
19	19	"Kids Supper"	February 24, 2011
It's a kid's themed meal as Buddy is making Kid's Cavatelli with Broccoli and Cream and Crispy Halibut Fingers. And for dessert, Buddy's kids- Sophia, Buddy Jr. and Marco help their Dad make Chocolate Chip Ice Cream Sandwiches.
20	20	"Simple Italian"	February 25, 2011
Buddy's got you covered with these easy and simple family recipes: Chicken Piccata, Sauteed Mushrooms, Roasted Potatoes and for dessert Cocoa-Hazelnut Crème with Berries. With these scrumptious recipes, your guests will think you've been cooking for days!
21	21	"Winter Supper"	February 28, 2011
Buddy and his sister Maddalena cook up hearty dishes like Mozzarella en Carrozza, Perfect Pot Roast and Rockin' Rice Pudding. These three dishes are warm comfort, Italian style!
22	22	"Meal on a Budget"	March 1, 2011
Buddy's cooking up some classic family recipes that are not only delicious, but easy on the pocketbook. With some tasty and affordable ingredients Buddy creates dishes like Mama's Chicken and Potatoes, Pasta Fagiole and Fried Zucchini Patties.
23	23	"Buddy's Best Breakfast Ever"	March 4, 2011
A breakfast menu, featuring a Hoboken-style frittata; pancakes with bacon; waffles with a hazelnut spread; and homemade chocolate milk.
24	24	"Brunch Bonanza"	March 7, 2011
Buddy is going all out for this brunch bonanza with Italian French Toast, Basil Omelet's and Roasted Rosemary Potatoes with Pancetta. Hit the snooze button, because there's no reason for breakfast with a brunch menu like this one!
25	25	"Meaty Italian"	March 8, 2011
Who says Italian food is all about the pasta? Today, Buddy is making some mouth-watering Italian meat dishes like Lemony Lamb Chops, Roasted Pork Loin and Steak Buddy Style. Also, Cousin Vinnie stops by to sample the meaty goodness!
26	26	"Pasta Classics"	March 9, 2011
Everything old is new again! Buddy is re-inventing pasta classics like Pasta Bolognese, Spaghetti Carbonera, Orzo Salad and Pasta Pesto! Also, Mama and Sergio stop by to help with the pasta preparations!
27	27	"Hoboken Style, Baby!"	March 10, 2011
Buddy is cooking up a meal inspired by the legendary Hoboken native Frank Sinatra. He's making classic Italian dishes like Clams Possillipo, Veal Milanese and a deliciously sweet Lemon Pasticiotti.
28	28	"Italian Entertaining"	March 11, 2011
Italian finger foods, including grilled oregano-chicken skewers; polenta cakes with goat cheese and shiitake mushrooms; sausage pigs in a blanket; and classic biscotti.
29	29	"What's In the Pantry"	March 14, 2011
Pantry staples are used to make white-bean-and-garlic dip; antipasto salad; pasta with peas, ham and cream; and funnel cake.
30	30	"Soup and Panini"	March 15, 2011
Chicken-and-pesto paninis, served with Manhattan clam chowder and Italian-style potato chips
31	31	"Family Feast"	March 16, 2011
Rack of lamb, fried artichokes and Italian wheat pie with wheat berries complete a family feast.
32	32	"A Meal To Remember"	March 17, 2011
Buddy Valastro prepares his father's favorite dishes. Included: blue crabs; stuffed eggplant; smoked-salmon risotto; chocolate mousse.
33	33	"Hot And Spicy"	March 18, 2011
Spicy foods are made. Included: seafood fra diavolo; sautéed spicy peppers; pepper steak
34	34	"Seaside Suppers"	March 21, 2011
A seafood feast, featuring Sicilian fish soup; clams and chorizo; and jumbo shrimp stuffed with breadcrumbs.
35	35	"Cooking From The Heart"	March 22, 2011
Upside-down mussels, sautéed escarole and ricotta cheesecake are prepared. Included: tips for shucking mussels.
36	36	"Aunt Nina's Secrets"	March 23, 2011
Prepared: meatless "meatballs"; roasted leg of lamb; stuffed mushrooms.
37	37	"Breakfast of Champs"	March 24, 2011
Breakfast foods are prepared. Included: polenta Florentine with poached eggs; a sausage breakfast strata; fresh fruit with honeyed mascarpone; cappuccino-banana smoothies.
38	38	"Getting Cheesy"	March 25, 2011
On the menu: Caprese salad; chicken stuffed with mozzarella and sausage; fried bocconcini balls.
39	39	"Anniversary Dinner"	March 28, 2011
Saffron risotto, osso bucco and a chocolate-truffle cake are made.
40	40	"Everything Apple"	March 29, 2011
Prepared: pork loin with apple sauce; fennel-and-apple salad; apple cake.

=== Season 2 (2012) ===
No. overall	No. in season	Title	Original release date
41	1	"Market Fresh"	January 31, 2012
Buddy cooks a selection of his family favorites using fresh foods purchased at a farmer's market.
42	2	"Italian Classics"	February 1, 2012
Buddy's sister Madeline join him in cooking their favorite family dishes.
43	3	"Buddy's Bachelor Night"	February 2, 2012
Buddy cooks up a selection of dishes fit for eligible bachelors, cousin Anthony and Maurizio.
44	4	"Buddy's Asian Spin"	February 3, 2012
Buddy cooks a feast of favorite Asian dishes the only way he knows how -- Hoboken style.
45	5	"Aunt Anna's Visit"	February 7, 2012
Buddy's aunt and uncle, Anna and Cosmo, pay a visit to cook their comfort food favorites.
46	6	"Soup & Sandwiches"	February 9, 2012
Buddy makes his favorite soup and sandwich meal.
47	7	"Fair is Fowl"	February 10, 2012
Buddy shows more savory ways to cook poultry.
48	8	"Valentine Bistro at Home"	February 14, 2012
Buddy and Mauro make French bistro favorites for their spouses in celebration of Valentine's Day.
49	9	"Take Out Made Fresh"	February 15, 2012
Buddy makes fresh alternatives to Chinese take out food.
50	10	"All In The Wrist"	February 16, 2012
Buddy and Joey cook a menu of decadent dishes that are simple to make, but take a considerable amount of labor to make.
51	11	"Seaside Favorites"	February 17, 2012
Buddy cooks a selection of his favorite seafood.
52	12	"Mexican Fiesta"	February 21, 2012
53	13	"Mainly Meat"	February 22, 2012
54	14	"Beans Baby"	February 23, 2012
55	15	"Comfort Food"	February 24, 2012
56	16	"Cooking for a Crowd"	February 27, 2012
Buddy's cousin Vinny, and his sister in law Daniella, pay a visit for dinner.
57	17	"Everything from Scratch"	February 28, 2012
Buddy cooks a meal featuring foods and ingredients made entirely from scratch, including mozzarella.
58	18	"Picky Eaters"	February 29, 2012
Buddy makes a selection of dishes that even picky kids would love, especially three of Buddy's kids, who are on hand to judge.
59	19	"Mediterranean Flavors"	March 1, 2012
Buddy cooks a selection of authentic Mediterranean dishes, including his friend's green bean salad.
60	20	"Buddy's Dream Meal"	March 2, 2012
61	21	TBA	March 5, 2012
62	22	"All in the Family"	March 6, 2012
63	23	"Pizza Buffet"	March 7, 2012
64	24	"Feast of the Fishes"	March 8, 2012
65	25	"Chocolate"	March 9, 2012
66	26	"Sweet and Savory"	March 12, 2012
67	27	"Pig Feast"	March 13, 2012
68	28	"Sunday Supper"	March 14, 2012
69	29	"Cooking with Wine"	March 15, 2012
70	30	"Brunch"	March 16, 2012
71	31	"Party Bites"	March 19, 2012
72	32	"Light & Airy"	March 20, 2012
73	33	"Decadent Dinner"	March 22, 2012
74	34	"Rome Anniversary"	March 23, 2012
75	35	"Sausage Show"	March 26, 2012
76	36	"Viewer Requests"	March 27, 2012
77	37	"Mardi Gras"	March 28, 2012
78	38	"Father P's Favorites"	March 29, 2012
79	39	"Rustic Italian with Lidia Bastianich"	March 30, 2012
80	40	"Mother's Day"	April 1, 2012
