= Buddy Valastro =

American pastry chef (born 1977)

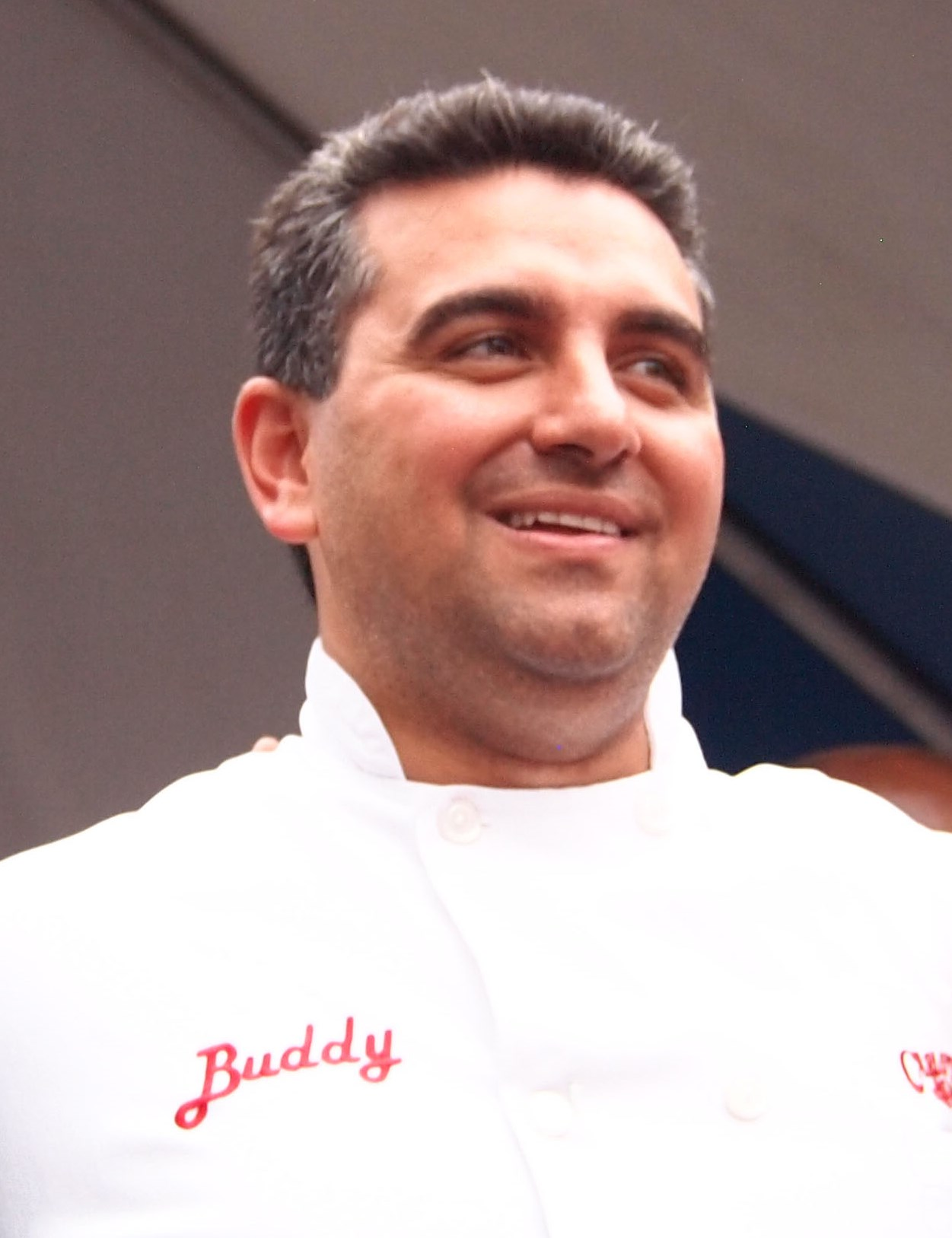
- Valastro at the 2013 Jersey City Mayoral Inauguration
- Born: Bartolo Valastro Jr. March 3, 1977 (age 49); Hoboken, New Jersey, U.S.
- Occupations: Baker; television personality; businessman
- Known for: Baker, cake designer and host of Cake Boss
- Television: Cake Boss
- Title: Owner of Carlo's Bakery, Buddy V's Events, The Boss Cafe, Pizza Cake, & Buddy V's Ristorante
- Spouse: Lisa Valastro (m. 2001)
- Children: 4
- Website: carlosbakery.com cakehousemedia.com

Bartolo "Buddy" Valastro Jr. (born March 3, 1977) is an American baker, reality television personality, and businessman. He has taken his small, family-owned bake shop, Carlo's Bakery, and turned it into a baking and restaurant empire. Valastro is best known as the star of the reality television series Cake Boss, which ran on the TLC cable channel from April 2009 until April 2020. He has also starred in Next Great Baker (2010), Kitchen Boss (2011), Buddy's Bakery Rescue (2013), Bake You Rich (2013), Bakery Boss (2013), Buddy vs. Duff (2019), Buddy vs. Christmas (2020) Buddy Valastro's Cake Dynasty (2023–present) and Legends of the Fork (2023–present)

Valastro was born in Hoboken. He grew up there and in Little Ferry, New Jersey. His mother, Mary Tubito (1948–2017), was born in Altamura, Italy. She is the daughter of Italian immigrants Nicola and Maddalena Tubito. They moved to New Jersey when she was six years old. His father, Buddy Sr., was born in Lipari, Italy. Valastro grew up with four older sisters: Grace, Mary, Maddalena and Lisa.

He attended Ridgefield Park High School and took baking courses at the Bergen County Technical High School, Teterboro Campus.

Valastro began working at his family's business, Carlo's Bakery at age 11, alongside his father. When his father died in 1994, Valastro was 17 and began to take over the family business. In the fifth episode of the first season of Cake Dynasty, he explains that his oldest son, known as Junior, is the first "Buddy Valastro" to graduate from high school.

== Career ==
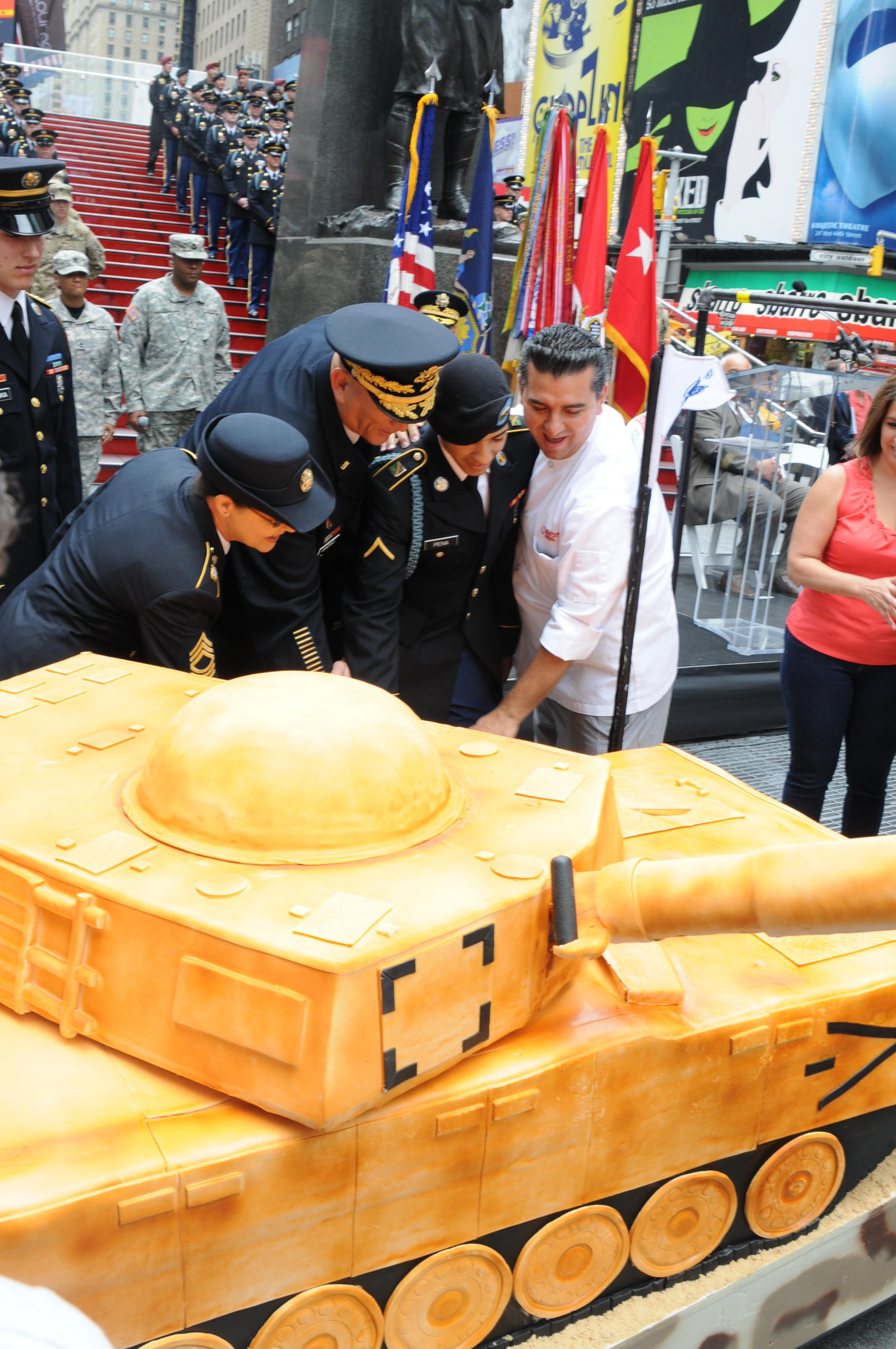
Buddy Valastro (right), General Raymond T. Odierno, and other members of the United States Army in Times Square cutting a cake to celebrate the Army's 238th birthday in 2012

Valastro grew the family bakery business into designer wedding cakes that were featured in bridal magazines. Through that exposure he was asked to compete in four Food Network Challenge cake competitions. After losing his first three battles, he took the top prize of $10,000 on "battle of the brides". He then pitched a reality show about life at Carlo's, where he worked with his mother, sister and various in-laws and cousins. TLC picked up the show in 2009.

In 2010 he authored his first book, Cake Boss, Stories and Recipes from Mia Famiglia. He followed it up with other books, including, Baking with the Cake Boss: 100 of Buddy’s Best Recipes and Decorating Secrets, Cooking Italian with the Cake Boss: Family Favorites as Only Buddy Can Serve Them Up and Family Celebrations with the Cake Boss.

In January 2012, as a result of the attention that the shop and the TV series had brought to the city of Hoboken, the Hudson Reporter named Valastro as an honorable mention in its list of Hudson County's 50 most influential people. He was inducted into the New Jersey Hall of Fame in 2017 and was introduced by Yankees' pitcher Mariano Rivera. At the ceremony Valastro said, "I am damn proud to be from this state."

Carlo's Bakery once had seven locations in New Jersey: Hoboken, Marlton, Morristown, Red Bank, Ridgewood, Wayne, and Westfield. Only the Hoboken and Marlton locations are operating as of December 2023. There are also bakeries in New York City; Bethlehem, Pennsylvania; Uncasville, Connecticut; Orlando, Florida; Las Vegas; San Antonio, Texas, and Bloomington, Minnesota. There previously were stores in Philadelphia and Pittsburgh, Pennsylvania; Westbury, New York; The Woodlands, Texas, and São Paulo, Brazil. The Lackawanna Center in Jersey City, located less than a mile from the original Hoboken shop, serves as the corporate office for the business and is used as additional space to create wedding and specialty cakes, and to bake specialty baked goods for shipment across the country.

In 2013 he opened Buddy V's Ristorante, an Italian restaurant at the Venetian Hotel in Las Vegas. His restaurant chain has grown in the city to include PizzaCake at Harrah's, and Buddy's Jersey Eats and The Boss Cafe at The Linq.

Valastro launched an event planning and catering company, Buddy V's Events, in June 2014.

In 2016 Valastro partnered with Whole Earth Sweetener Co. on the campaign "Rethink Sweet". The company said Valastro would serve as brand ambassador for a "new line of zero- and lower-calorie sweeteners, and will work to help his fans make healthy lifestyle choices", and provide recipes using the product.

In 2018 Valastro partnered with The Pound Bakery, a pet treat manufacturing company, to redesign and launch a new line of pet treats. "We wanted to create palatable treats for dogs that are inspired by classic Italian entrees and desserts", said Lexie Berglund, President of The Pound Bakery. Buddy also worked with several other companies to launch a full line of ready-to-use fondant, buttercream icing, and Italian Biscotti cookies under the new brand name Buddy Valastro Foods in 2018.

In 2019, Valastro launched "cake ATMs" – slices of cake sold through high-tech refrigerated vending machines in Las Vegas and Toronto. Dozens of machines are now located in Canada and the US, primarily in Florida, Las Vegas and New Jersey.

In 2023 he moved to A&E cable network and launched Cake Dynasty, which focuses on his children joining the business, and Legends of the Fork, which visits restaurants around the country.

== Philanthropy ==
Valastro, a supporter of the Special Olympics, baked a commemorative cake for the 2011 announcement that the 2014 Special Olympics USA National Games would be held in New Jersey.

He has granted hundreds of sick children their wish to bake with him as part of "Make-A-Wish".

== Personal life ==
Buddy and Elisabetta "Lisa" Valastro (née Belgiovine) married on October 14, 2001. Until 2014, Valastro resided in East Hanover Township, New Jersey, with their four children: Sofia, Bartolo "Buddy" III, Marco, and Carlo. As of 2014, he has resided in Montville, New Jersey.

His stepfather is Sergio Piccinch. His four older sisters and their husbands appear frequently in his television shows: Grace and Joey Faugno, Maddalena and Mauro Castano, Mary and Joe Sciarrone, and Lisa Valastro. Lisa's former husband, Remy González, left the show after his arrest for sexual assault of a 13-year-old girl in 2010. He was sentenced to nine years in prison for the assault in 2012.

His brother-in-law, Maurizio Belgiovine, is the director of operations at Carlo's Bakery.

On November 13, 2014, Valastro was arrested for driving while intoxicated. His driver's license was suspended for 90 days, and he paid a $300 fine.

In September 2020, Valastro had his right (dominant) hand impaled by a pinsetter at his home bowling alley. His sons and other family members rescued him by cutting him out of the machine. He underwent two emergency surgeries and several subsequent surgeries. He said in November 2023 that he has gotten back about 95% of the strength in his hand.

=== Politics ===
Valastro supported and campaigned for Republican Governor Chris Christie in his 2013 re-election bid, and in 2014 baked his birthday cake. He also endorsed Christie's 2016 presidential campaign.

== Filmography ==
=== Television ===
Year	Title	Role	Notes
2007	Food Network Challenge	Guest mentor	Episode: "Battle of the Brides"
2009–2020	Cake Boss	Host	
2010–2014	Next Great Baker	Host / Judge	
2014	Next Great Baker: Latin America	Host / Judge	
2011–2012	Kitchen Boss	Host	
2013–2014	Buddy's Bakery Rescue	Host	
2015	The Apprentice	Guest judge	Episode: "May the Gods of Good Pies Be with Us"
2015–2018	Batalha dos Confeiteiros	Host / Judge	
2016	Batalha dos Cozinheiros	Host / Judge	
2016	Buddy's Family Vacation	Host	
2016	Bakers vs. Fakers	Host	
2017	Dancing with the Stars Brazil	Judge	Christmas special
2018–2019	Buddy's Big Bakedown	Host	
2018	Impractical Jokers	Himself	Episode: "Pulling the Rug"
2019	Buddy vs. Duff	Himself	Lost to Duff 258-254
2019	Bake You Rich	Host / Judge	
2019	Beat Bobby Flay	Guest Judge	Episode: "Grapes of Wrath"
2020	Beat Bobby Flay	Contestant	Episode: "No Cake Walk". He challenged Bobby with his signature Multi-Layered Cake. He also won that challenge.
2020	Nickelodeon's Unfiltered	Himself	Episode: "Avocado Toasted Piñatas!"
2023–2024	Legends of the Fork	Host	
2023–2024	Buddy Valastro's Cake Dynasty	Himself	Spinoff of Cake Boss

=== As producer ===
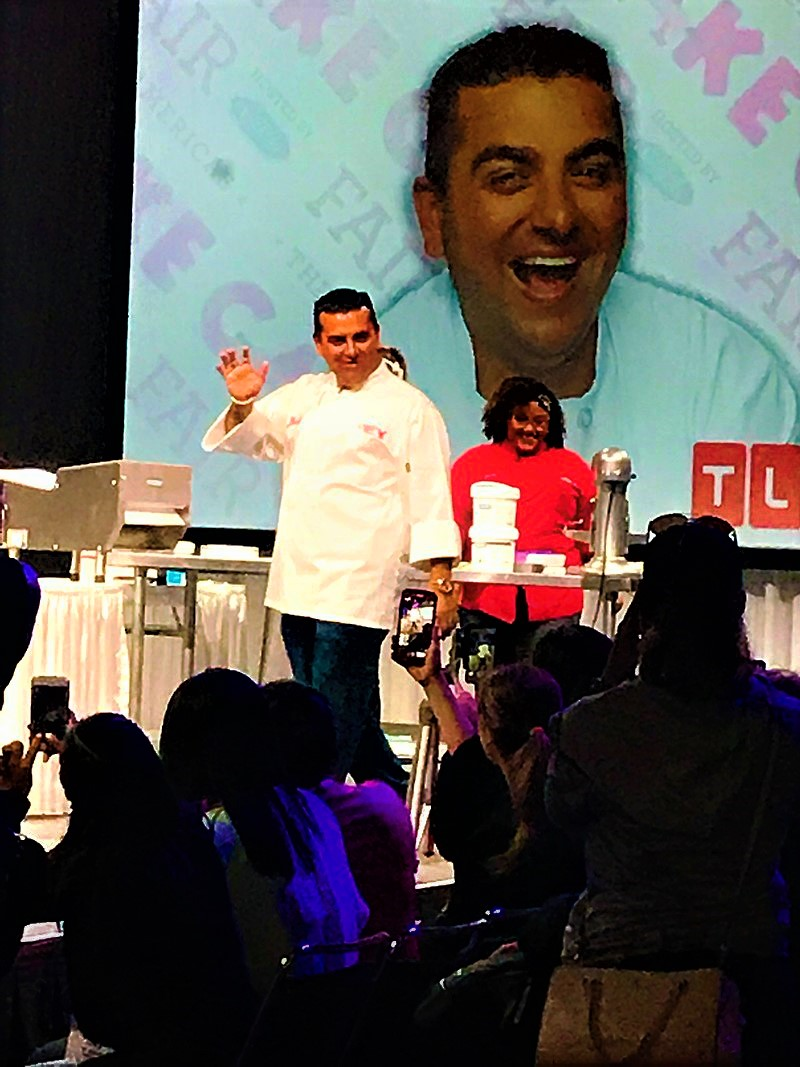
Buddy Valastro walking onstage waving to fans at a cake fair in Orlando, Florida, 2017

Year	Title	Notes
2010–2012	Next Great Baker	6 episodes
2011–2012	Kitchen Boss	All episodes
2015–2018	Batalha dos Confeiteiros	All episodes
2016	Batalha dos Cozinheiros	All episodes
2016	Cake Boss	8 episodes
2016	Cooks vs. Cons	1 episode
2016	Bakers vs. Fakers	All episodes
2023–2024	Legends of the Fork	All episodes

== See also ==
- List of pastry chefs
