= Carlo's Bake Shop =

Bakeries of the United States

Coordinates: 40°44′14″N 74°01′51″W

Carlo's Bake Shop (2026)

Carlo's Bake Shop, commonly known as Carlo's Bakery and also known as Carlo's City Hall Bake Shop, is a bakery in Hoboken, New Jersey, owned by Buddy Valastro. The bakery has gained public attention as the setting of the TLC television series, Cake Boss.

== History ==
In 1910, Carlo's Bakery was founded by Italian pastry chef Carlo Guastaferro, and in 1964, it was purchased by Bartolo "Buddy" Valastro Sr. Valastro's son Buddy Valastro currently runs the bakery, with help from his four older sisters, three brothers-in-law, and other assorted family members and friends. One notable employee was Sal Picinich, who began working at the bakery shortly after the Valastro family purchased it, and continued until his death on January 30, 2011.

The bakery rose to fame with Cake Boss, a reality television series that premiered on TLC in April 2009, depicting the staff of the shop creating elaborate custom-order novelty cakes. As a result, the shop became a tourist attraction, and a key institution in Hoboken and Hudson County.

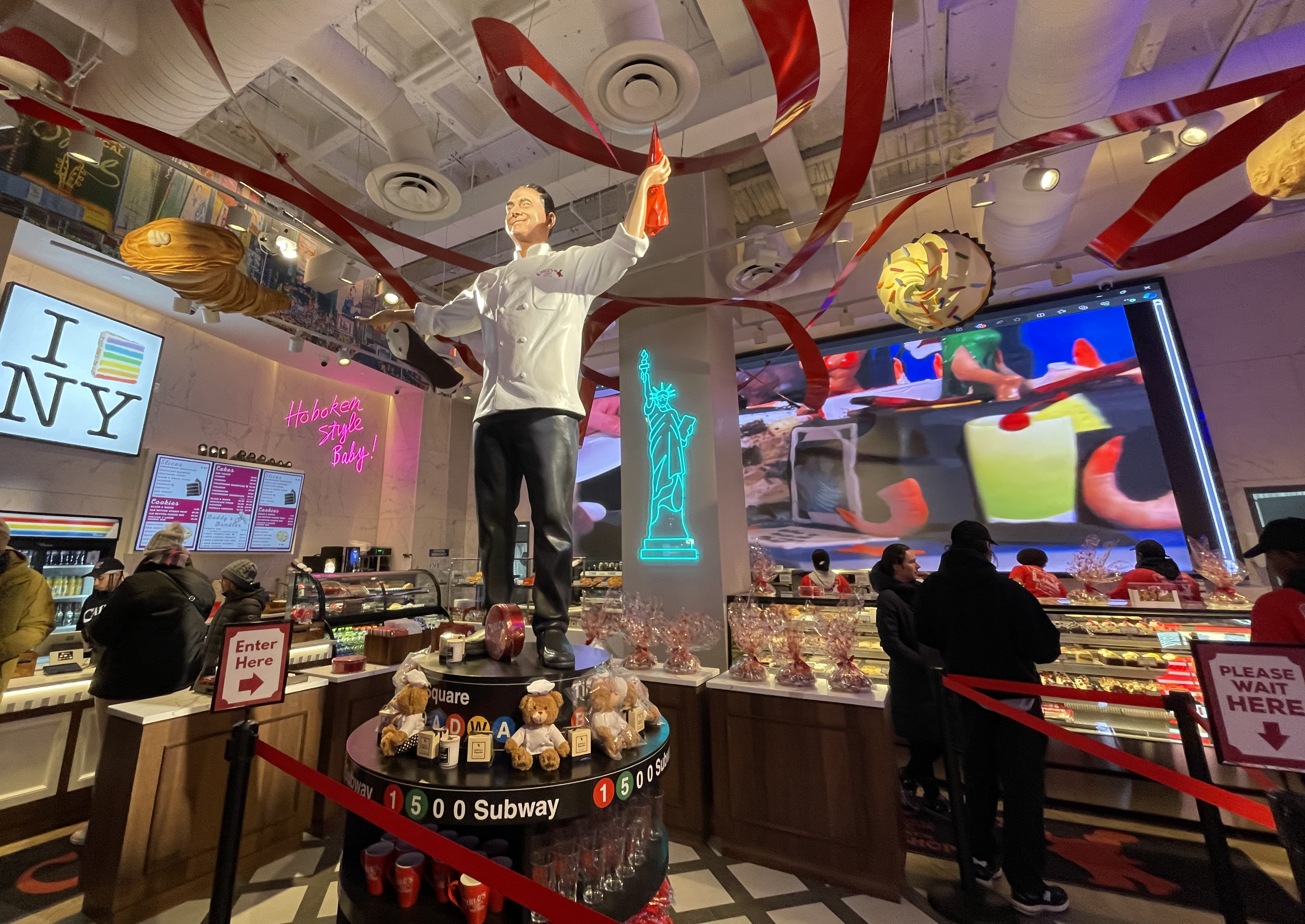
Carlo's Bakery in Times Sq, NY

As a result of the popularity of Cake Boss, Carlo's Bakery built a new factory at Lackawanna Center, a mixed industrial-retail complex in nearby Jersey City. Carlo's Bakery has leased space at the complex, which is used for additional space to make specialty cakes, as well as the ability to make baked goods for shipment across the country. Because of the limited space at the Hoboken location, Carlo's Bakery was unable to ship cakes beyond normal driving distance from the bakery; the bakery had conducted a limited trial Internet sale of pies in October 2009, to test the viability of selling baked goods on the Internet.

On May 24, 2011, Carlo's Bakery opened its first branch location, Cake Boss Cafe, at the Discovery Times Square Exposition at 226 West 44th Street in New York City's Times Square. This location offers Carlo's Bakery's smaller baked goods, as well as bakery and Cake Boss merchandise. On February 10, 2013, the Bakery opened its first full-range branch location in Ridgewood, New Jersey. On September 1, 2013, the Bakery opened its third bakery location in Westfield, New Jersey. The next bakery opened on November 23, 2013, in Red Bank, New Jersey.

In January 2012, as a result of the attention brought to the city of Hoboken by the shop and the TV series, the Hudson Reporter named Buddy Valastro Jr. as an honorable mention in its list of Hudson County's 50 most influential people.

On March 20, 2014, Carlo's opened a location in Morristown, New Jersey. and on March 31, one in The Venetian Resort Hotel Casino in Las Vegas, the company's first on the West Coast.

On December 5, 2015, Carlo's Bakery opened a location at The Florida Mall in Orlando, Florida.

On November 10, 2016, Carlo's opened a kiosk in Willowbrook Mall, in Wayne, New Jersey. Other New Jersey locations include Marlton and Westfield. A month later on December 8, Carlo's opened a location in São Paulo, the company's first bakery outside the United States. Managed by Rick Zavala, the winner of the RecordTV reality television competition series Batalha dos Confeiteiros.

On August 1, 2018, the Red Bank, New Jersey store closed after the lease expired. A spokesperson for the company announced that the company sought to create a different kind of dining experience similar to the location in Texas, for which the Red Bank location was not appropriate. The other five Carlo's Bakery locations in New Jersey remained open.

In January 2019, a spokesperson for Carlo's Bakery confirmed that the Morristown and Ridgewood locations closed in recent weeks.
