= 2026 United States Senate election in Texas =

- November 3, 2026
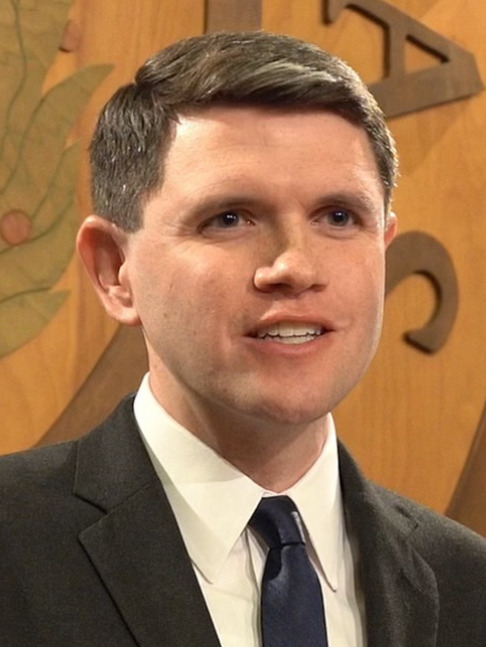

Nominee	James Talarico	Ken Paxton
Party	Democratic	Republican
Popular vote	5,447,080	4,250,704
Percentage	55.09%	42.99%
- Talarico: 40–50% 50–60% 60–70% 70–80% 80–90% Paxton: 40–50% 50–60% 60–70% 70–80% 80–90% >90%
U.S. senator before election
John Cornyn
Republican
Elected U.S. senator
James Talarico
Democratic

The 2026 United States Senate election in Texas was held on November 3, 2026, to elect the Class 2 member of the United States Senate from the state of Texas. Democratic state representative James Talarico defeated Republican state attorney general Ken Paxton.

Four-term Republican incumbent John Cornyn sought re-election, but was challenged for the party's nomination by Paxton, with neither receiving a majority in the March 3 primary. Aided by a late endorsement from President Donald Trump, Paxton won a runoff on May 26 with 63.8% of the vote, making Cornyn the first incumbent senator from Texas to lose renomination since 1970. In the Democratic primary, Talarico won the nomination with 52.4% of the vote over Representative Jasmine Crockett.

The general election was considered to be one of the most competitive Senate races in 2026. The race was the most expensive in Senate history; Talarico raised over $146 million in campaign donations, while Paxton was primarily supported by super PACs, including over $200 million from Elon Musk alone. While Talarico maintained a narrow polling lead throughout campaign season, he defeated Paxton on Election Day by an unexpectedly large 12-point margin. Talarico's win was part of a broad wave of victories for Democrats in Texas, who flipped every statewide office on the ballot from Republican control. Talarico became the first Democrat to win a Senate election in Texas since 1988.

== Background ==
Texas has been considered a Republican-leaning state throughout the 21st century. At the time of the election, Democrats had not won a U.S. Senate election in the state since Lloyd Bentsen was re-elected in 1988, and they had not won any statewide election in the state since lieutenant governor Bob Bullock was re-elected in 1994. Republicans also had fully controlled the Texas Legislature since the 2002 elections.

Texas's Republican lean has waned in the past decade, however, with Democrats only narrowly losing the 2018 elections for U.S. Senate and attorney general, buoyed by gains in the state's suburban areas. Most recently prior to the election, Republicans made substantial gains with the state's Hispanic population, particularly in the Rio Grande Valley. Republican Donald Trump won the state by nearly 14 percentage points in the 2024 presidential election, while U.S. Senator Ted Cruz won re-election by over 8 points on the same ballot.

Incumbent Republican senator John Cornyn was first elected in 2002 to succeed fellow Republican Phil Gramm. Cornyn had previously served as the state's attorney general, as well as a member of the state's Supreme Court. He most recently won re-election in 2020 with 53.5% of the vote against Democrat M. J. Hegar. Cornyn has a consistently conservative voting record in the U.S. Senate, and he is considered part of the Republican establishment due to his long tenure in politics.

== Republican primary ==
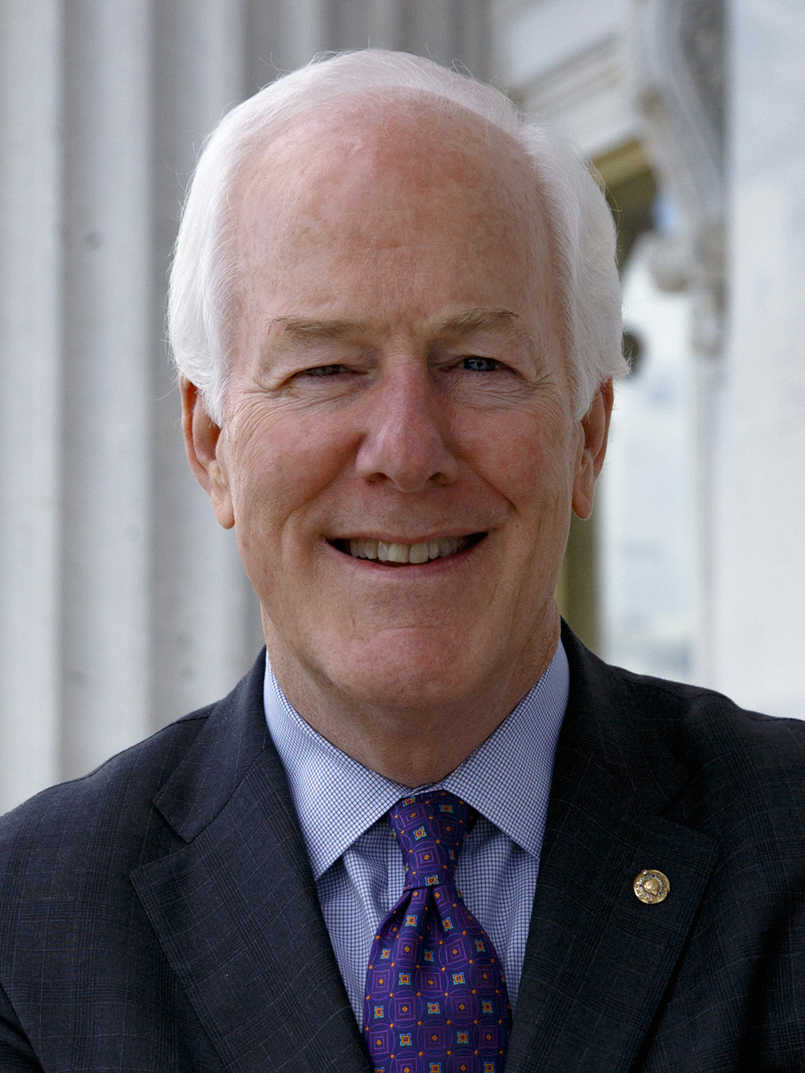
Incumbent senator John Cornyn was defeated in the Republican primary runoff.

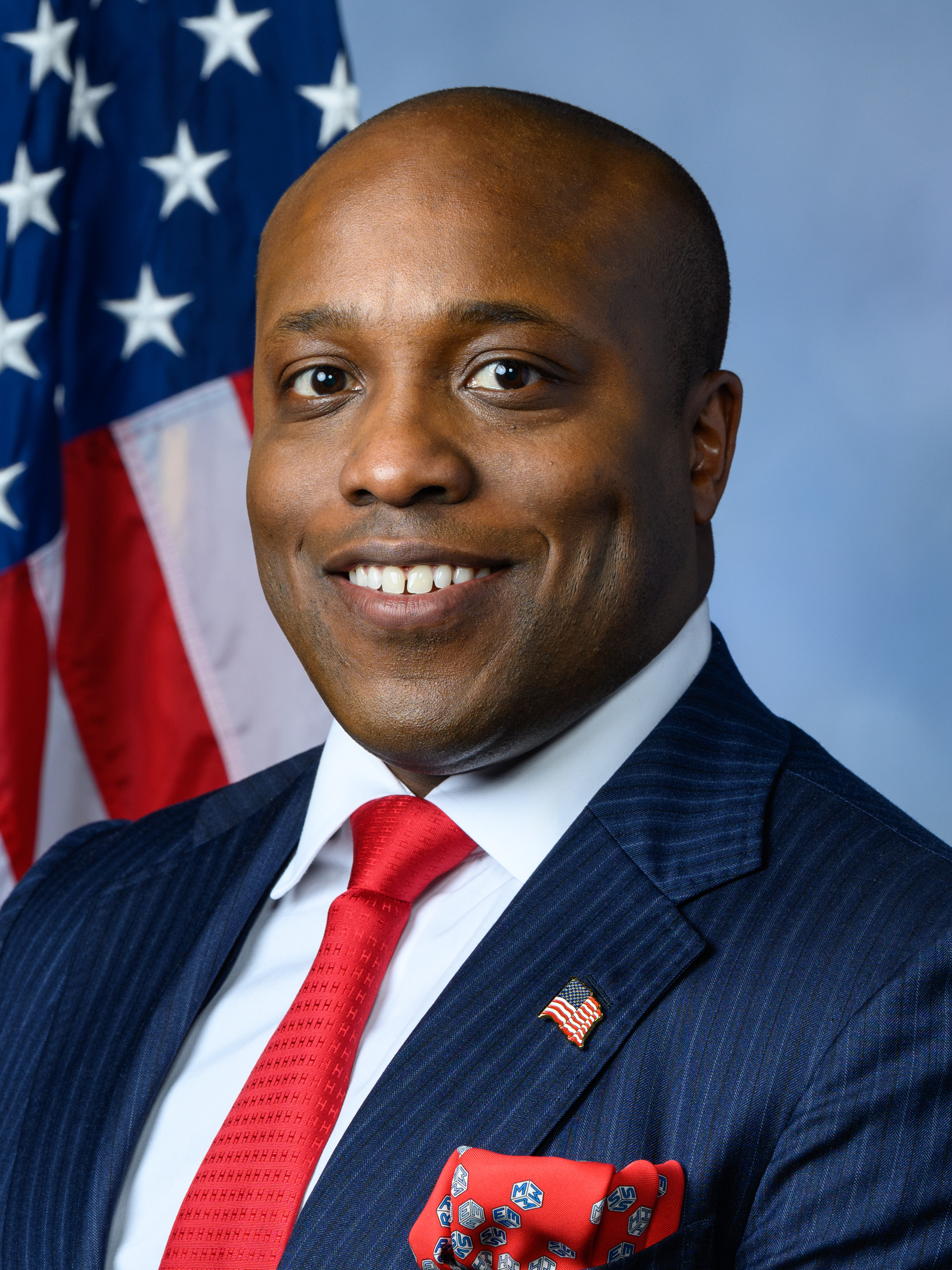
U.S. Representative Wesley Hunt finished third in the Republican primary.

=== Background ===
Incumbent senator John Cornyn, who was seeking a fifth term, faced a competitive primary election campaign from attorney general Ken Paxton which progressed to a runoff after no candidate reached a majority in the first round. The two had clashed publicly since 2022, with Paxton criticizing Cornyn for being insufficiently conservative, particularly over his support for U.S. aid to Ukraine, the DREAM Act for DACA beneficiaries, and for playing a leading role in the passage of the bipartisan gun safety bill after the Uvalde school massacre. Cornyn, in turn, highlighted Paxton's legal troubles, perceived character flaws and corruption, and his 2023 impeachment, in which Paxton was impeached by the Republican-controlled Texas House before the Senate later acquitted him of all charges.

The primary race was seen as a key contest between the Texas Republican Party's establishment wing and its hardline conservative faction. In the years leading up to the election, insurgent hard-right candidates had steadily gained ground, often ousting more traditional GOP officials. Polling reflected this divide: Paxton held a commanding lead among "Trump Movement" voters, while Cornyn performed better with the smaller group of "Traditional Republicans." On May 19, 2026, Donald Trump announced his endorsement for Paxton, having previously described both Paxton and Cornyn as good friends. His influence was widely seen as a key factor in determining the primary winner. He had previously criticized Cornyn as a "hopeless" RINO (Republican in name only) for supporting the Bipartisan Safer Communities Act, an attack Paxton's campaign highlighted in their ads. Ted Cruz, the junior senator, avoided taking a side in the primary, though he previously endorsed Cornyn in 2020.

The election takes place amid efforts by the state Republican Party to restrict its primary to registered members. Legislation to allow closed primaries failed, prompting the party to sue the state, claiming the current law violates the First Amendment. Despite serving as the state's attorney general, Paxton declined to defend the law in court, drawing criticism from those who argued he would gain electorally from a closed primary.

=== Candidates ===
==== Nominee ====
- Ken Paxton, attorney general of Texas (2015–present)

==== Eliminated in runoff ====
- John Cornyn, incumbent U.S. senator (2002–present)

==== Eliminated in primary ====
- John Adefope
- Anna Bender, IT analyst
- Virgil Bierschwale, software developer and candidate for U.S. Senate in 2020
- Sara Canady, former Wilson County justice of the peace and candidate for Texas's 15th congressional district in 2022
- Wesley Hunt, U.S. representative from Texas's 38th congressional district (2023–present) (endorsed Paxton)
- Gulrez "Gus" Khan, entrepreneur, candidate for Texas's 32nd congressional district in 2024, and candidate for mayor of Lubbock in 2022

==== Withdrawn ====
- Alexander Duncan, police officer
- Rennie Mann, president of the Richland Springs school board
- Barrett McNabb, chiropractic business owner (ran for U.S. House)
- Tony Schmoker, realtor
- Leo Wyatt

=== First round ===
==== Campaign ====
Paxton led Cornyn in early polling both before and after entering the race, though concerns about his general election viability persisted, as polls showed him underperforming Cornyn and, in some cases, trailing hypothetical Democratic opponents. This led many Republicans to back Cornyn, as Senate GOP leaders pressed Trump for an endorsement. Cornyn told The Wall Street Journal in June 2025 that he would consider stepping aside if a stronger candidate emerged to defeat Paxton, but he quickly walked back the comment, stating he would remain in the race. Congressman Wesley Hunt entered the race in late 2025, further scrambling the race and increasing the chance of a runoff.

All three candidates competed for the endorsement of Donald Trump, having made support for him and his agenda central to their campaigns; however, Trump declined to back a single candidate, instead stating he supported "all three". Cornyn had maintained a substantial fundraising lead over the other candidates throughout the race, spending much of it attacking Paxton. The early three-way polling was very narrow, usually with Cornyn and Paxton making the runoff and no candidate close to winning outright. While campaigning, all three tapped into Islamophobic sentiment in their advertisements and actions, with Cornyn and Paxton having targeted the EPIC City development in Collin County with investigations and lawsuits.

==== Endorsements ====
John Cornyn

Executive branch officials

- Susan Combs, former U.S. assistant secretary of the interior (2019–2020) and comptroller of Texas (2007–2015)
- Donald Evans, former U.S. secretary of commerce (2001–2005)
- Kay Bailey Hutchison, former U.S. ambassador to NATO (2017–2021) and U.S. senator from Texas (1993–2013)
- Rick Perry, former U.S. secretary of energy (2017–2019) and governor of Texas (2000–2015)
- Pamela Willeford, former U.S. ambassador to Switzerland and Liechtenstein (2003–2006)

U.S. senators

- John Barrasso, Senate majority whip (2025–present) from Wyoming (2007–present)
- Marsha Blackburn, Tennessee (2019–present)
- Katie Britt, Alabama (2023–present)
- Tom Cotton, Arkansas (2015–present)
- Steve Daines, Montana (2015–present)
- Lindsey Graham, South Carolina (2003–2026)
- Phil Gramm, former Texas (1985–2002)
- Bill Hagerty, Tennessee (2021–present)
- John Hoeven, North Dakota (2011–present)
- Mike Lee, Utah (2011–present)
- Rand Paul, Kentucky (2011–present)
- Pete Ricketts, Nebraska (2023–present)
- Rick Scott, Florida (2019–present)
- Tim Scott, South Carolina (2013–present)
- Tim Sheehy, Montana (2025–present)
- John Thune, Senate majority leader (2025–present) from South Dakota (2005–present)
- Tommy Tuberville, Alabama (2021–present)

U.S. representatives

- Bill Archer, former TX-07 (1971–2001)
- Joe Barton, former TX-06 (1985–2019)
- Henry Bonilla, former TX-23 (1993–2007)
- Kevin Brady, former TX-08 (1997–2023)
- Michael Burgess, former TX-26 (2003–2025)
- Quico Canseco, former TX-23 (2011–2013)
- Mike Conaway, former TX-11 (2005–2021)
- John Culberson, former TX-07 (2001–2019)
- Tom DeLay, former House majority leader (2003–2005) from TX-22 (1985–2006)
- Jake Ellzey, TX-06 (2021–present)
- Bill Flores, former TX-17 (2011–2021)
- Craig Goldman, TX-12 (2025–present)
- Jeb Hensarling, former TX-05 (2003–2019)
- French Hill, AR-02 (2015–present)
- Kenny Marchant, former TX-24 (2005–2021)
- Michael McCaul, TX-10 (2005–present)
- Pete Olson, former TX-22 (2009–2021)
- Ted Poe, former TX-02 (2005–2019)
- Lamar Smith, former TX-21 (1987–2019)
- Mac Thornberry, former TX-13 (1995–2021)

Statewide officials

- Jeffrey S. Boyd, former justice of the Texas Supreme Court (2012–2025)
- Harriet O'Neill, former justice of the Texas Supreme Court (1999–2010)

State legislators

- Dade Phelan, former speaker of the House (2021–2025) from HD-21 (2015–present)
- 6 other current state representatives (Note: Giovanni Capriglione, HD-98 (2013–present); Drew Darby, HD-72 (2007–present); Charlie Geren, HD-99 (2001–present); Brooks Landgraf, former HD-81 (2015–present); Carl Tepper, HD-84 (2023–present); Terry Wilson, HD-20 (2017–present))
- 8 former state representatives (Note: Rodney Anderson, former HD-105 (2015–2019) and HD-106 (2011–2013); Myra Crownover, former HD-64 (2000–2017); John Cyrier, former HD-17 (2015–2023); Larry Gonzales, former HD-52 (2011–2018); Stephanie Klick, former House majority leader (2019–2021) from HD-91 (2013–2025); Dee Margo, former HD-78 (2011–2013) and mayor of El Paso (2017–2021); Four Price, former HD-87 (2011–2025); John N. Raney, former HD-14 (2011–2025))

Local officials

- Jim Darling, former mayor of McAllen (2013–2021) (Democratic)
- J.E. "Eddie" Guerra, sheriff of Hidalgo County (2014–present) (Democratic)
- Mattie Parker, mayor of Fort Worth (2021–present)
- Dan Pope, former mayor of Lubbock (2016–2022)
- Betsy Price, former mayor of Fort Worth (2011–2021)
- Pete Saenz, former mayor of Laredo (2014–2022) (Democratic)
- Javier Villalobos, mayor of McAllen (2021–present)

Individuals

- Ayaan Hirsi Ali, conservative activist and former member of the Dutch House of Representatives (2003–2006)
- Max Lucado, pastor
- Jim McIngvale, businessman

Labor unions

- Combined Law Enforcement Associations of Texas
- Dallas Police Association
- National Border Patrol Council

Organizations

- AIPAC (co-endorsed with Hunt)
- American Academy of Orthopaedic Surgeons
- American Ambulance Association
- ClearPath Foundation
- Independent Bankers Association of Texas
- National Association of Realtors
- National Association of Home Builders
- National Federation of Independent Business
- National Republican Senatorial Committee
- Republican Jewish Coalition
- Senate Leadership Fund
- Texas Alliance for Life
- Texas Association of Manufacturers
- Texas Association of Realtors
- Texas Chemistry Council
- Texas and Southwestern Cattle Raisers Association
- Texas Farm Bureau
- Texas Homebuilders Association
- Texas Medical Association
- United States Chamber of Commerce

Newspapers

- Austin American-Statesman
- Dallas Morning News
- Fort Worth Star-Telegram
- Houston Chronicle
- San Antonio Express-News
Ken Paxton

Executive branch officials

- Steve Bannon, former senior counselor to the president (2017)
- John Rich, United States special envoy for American landowners (2026–present)

U.S. representatives

- Lance Gooden, TX-05 (2019–present)
- Troy Nehls, TX-22 (2021–present)

State legislators

- Anthony Kern, former Arizona's SD-27 (2023–2025)

Individuals

- Ted Nugent, guitarist and singer
- Randy Quaid, actor

Organizations

- Gun Owners of America
- Republicans for National Renewal
- Texas Gun Rights
- Turning Point Action
Wesley Hunt

U.S. representatives

- Eli Crane, AZ-02 (2023–present) (endorsed Paxton in the runoff)

Organizations

- AIPAC (co-endorsed with Cornyn)
- Austin Republican Liberty Caucus
Declined to endorse

U.S. senators

- Ted Cruz, Texas (2013–present)

U.S. representatives

- Brian Babin, TX-36 (2015–present)
- Keith Self, TX-03 (2023–present)

Statewide officials

- Greg Abbott, governor of Texas (2015–present)
- Dan Patrick, lieutenant governor of Texas (2015–present)

State legislators

- Angela Paxton, former majority leader of the Texas Senate (2023–2025) from the 8th district (2019–present)

Labor unions

- Texas AFL-CIO (Note: Endorsement only applicable for the primary election.)

==== Fundraising ====
Candidates in italics withdrew before the primary election took place.

Campaign finance reports as of February 11, 2026 (Note: Some candidates may have not published fundraising totals as of the filing deadline.)
Candidate	Raised	Spent	Cash on hand
Virgil Bierschwale (R)	$9,988	$9,657	$331
Sara Canady (R)	$770	$7,061	$0
John Cornyn (R)	$11,155,399	$6,816,042	$4,972,818
Wesley Hunt (R)	$1,971,633	$4,116,502	$342,307
Gulrez Khan (R)	$10,443	$10,964	$0
Ken Paxton (R)	$5,857,093	$1,925,816	$3,931,277
Tony Schmoker (R)	$2,500	$3,107	$0
Source: Federal Election Commission

==== Polling ====
Aggregate polls

Source of poll aggregation	Dates administered	Dates updated	John Cornyn	Wesley Hunt	Ken Paxton	Other/ Undecided (Note: Calculated by taking the difference of 100% and all other candidates combined.)	Margin
270toWin	February 25 – March 2, 2026	March 3, 2026	35.2%	17.5%	38.7%	8.6%	Paxton +3.5%
Decision Desk HQ	through February 27, 2026	March 2, 2026	35.4%	16.5%	38.9%	9.2%	Paxton +3.5%
FiftyPlusOne	through February 27, 2026	March 3, 2026	29.5%	21.2%	35.6%	13.7%	Paxton +6.1%
RealClearPolitics	February 13–27, 2026	March 2, 2026	35.4%	15.8%	39.2%	9.6%	Paxton +3.8%
Average			33.9%	17.8%	38.1%	10.2%	Paxton +4.2%

Poll source	Date(s) administered	Sample size (Note: Key: A – all adults RV – registered voters LV – likely voters V – unclear)	Margin of error	John Cornyn	Wesley Hunt	Ken Paxton	Other	Undecided
YouGov	February 26 – March 2, 2026	1,659 (LV)	± 2.8%	32%	17%	36%	2% (Note: "Someone else" and "I [did/will] not vote in this primary" with 1%; John Adefope, Anna Bender, Virgil Bierschwale, and Sara Canady with 0%)	13%
Emerson College	February 26–27, 2026	547 (LV)	± 4.1%	36%	17%	40%	8% (Note: Anna Bender with 3%; Sara Canady and Gulrez Khan 2%; John Adefope with 1%; Virgil Bierschwale with 0%)	—
Quantus Insights (R)	February 25–26, 2026	939 (LV)	± 3.1%	38%	16%	43%	—	3%
Victory Phones (R) (Note: Poll sponsored by Hunt's campaign)	February 24–25, 2026	600 (LV)	—	30%	15%	39%	—	16%
Blueprint Polling (D)	February 23–24, 2026	529 (LV)	± 5.3%	30%	14%	42%	1% (Note: "Do not remember" with 1%; John Adefope, Anna Bender, Virgil Bierschwale, Sara Canady, Gulrez Khan, and "Did not vote in this race" with 0%)	13%
Peak Insights (R) (Note: Poll sponsored by Texans for a Conservative Majority PAC, which supports Cornyn)	February 19–23, 2026	800 (LV)	± 3.0%	36%	14%	36%	15%	
UT Tyler	February 13–22, 2026	— (LV)	—	41%	15%	35%	—	9%
UT Tyler	February 13–22, 2026	— (RV)	—	39%	19%	33%	—	9%
University of Texas/Texas Politics Project	February 2–16, 2026	350 (RV)	± 5.2%	34%	26%	36%	3% (Note: Bierschwale with 1%; "Someone else" with 2%)	—
McLaughlin & Associates (R)	February 9–12, 2026	800 (LV)	± 3.5%	29%	26%	36%	—	9%
Pulse Decision Science (R) (Note: Poll sponsored by Paxton's campaign)	February 8–11, 2026	800 (LV)	± 3.5%	27%	15%	36%	—	22%
Peak Insights (R)	February 3–8, 2026	1,000 (LV)	± 3.0%	29%	25%	31%	—	15%
Pulse Decision Science (R) (Note: Poll sponsored by Lone Star Liberty PAC, which supports Paxton)	February 1–3, 2026	801 (LV)	± 3.5%	26%	18%	34%	—	22%
J.L. Partners (R)	January 31 – February 3, 2026	600 (LV)	± 4.0%	26%	26%	27%	—	21%
Ragnar Research Partners (R)	January 29 – February 1, 2026	— (LV)	—	31%	24%	29%	—	16%
University of Houston/YouGov	January 20–31, 2026	550 (LV)	± 4.2%	31%	17%	38%	2% (Note: Sara Canady with 1%; "4 others" with <1%)	12%
Emerson College	January 10–12, 2026	550 (LV)	± 4.1%	26%	16%	27%	2% (Note: John Adefope with 1%; Anna Bender, Virgil Bierschwale, Sara Canady, and Gulrez Khan with a combined 1%)	29%
Harper Polling (R)	January 5–7, 2026	600 (LV)	± 4.0%	26%	23%	31%	—	20%
Deep Root Analytics (R)	January 5–11, 2026	— (LV)	—	29%	19%	26%	—	26%
Pulse Decision Science (R) (Note: Poll commissioned by a Paxton-allied super PAC.)	December 14–17, 2025	809 (LV)	± 3.4%	38%	16%	38%	—	8%
1892 Polling (R)	December 4, 2025	— (LV)	—	28%	19%	29%	—	24%
McLaughlin & Associates (R) (Note: Poll sponsored by Standing For Texas, who support Hunt)	December 1–4, 2025	800 (LV)	± 3.4%	27%	28%	33%	—	12%
J.L. Partners	December 1–3, 2025	600 (LV)	± 4.0%	24%	24%	29%	—	23%
co/efficient (R)	December 1–3, 2025	1,022 (LV)	± 3.07%	28%	19%	27%	—	26%
Public Policy Polling (D) (Note: Poll sponsored by the Senate Majority PAC, which supports Democratic candidates for U.S. Senate)	December 1–2, 2025	527 (LV)	—	22%	22%	32%	—	24%
Peak Insights (R)	November 20–25, 2025	600 (LV)	± 4.0%	35%	18%	33%	—	14%
Stratus Intelligence (R) (Note: Poll commissioned by a pro-Hunt group)	November 21–22, 2025	857 (LV)	± 3.3%	25%	26%	36%	—	13%
Ragnar Research Partners (R) (Note: Poll sponsored by the Senate Leadership Fund, which supports Cornyn)	November 13–16, 2025	758 (LV)	± 4.0%	32%	21%	31%	—	16%
Stratus Intelligence (R)	November 4–6, 2025	811 (LV)	± 4.6%	27%	26%	34%	—	13%
Harper Polling (R)	October 28–30, 2025	614 (LV)	± 4.0%	26%	24%	25%	—	25%
Hunt Research (R)	October 6–10, 2025	1,097 (LV)	± 2.96%	24%	19%	28%	—	29%
Stratus Intelligence (R)	October 4–6, 2025	— (V)	—	31%	24%	34%	—	11%
Peak Insights (R)	October 2025	600 (LV)	± 4.0%	34%	19%	36%	—	11%
University of Houston/ Texas Southern University	September 19 – October 1, 2025	576 (RV)	± 4.1%	33%	22%	34%	—	11%
Deep Root Analytics (R)	September 22–28, 2025	1,142 (LV)	—	33%	21%	28%	—	18%
UT Tyler	September 17–24, 2025	492 (RV)	± 3.1%	29%	14%	31%	—	26%
Ragnar Research Partners (R) (Note: Poll commissioned by One Nation, which supports Cornyn)	September 20–22, 2025	760 (LV)	± 3.6%	32%	17%	31%	—	20%
Stratus Intelligence (R)	September 14–16, 2025	842 (V)	—	28%	23%	38%	—	11%
Stratus Intelligence (R)	September 14–16, 2025	842 (V)	—	38%	23%	39%	—	
Stratus Intelligence (R)	August 24–26, 2025	— (V)	—	28%	23%	38%	—	11%
Stratus Intelligence (R)	August 4–6, 2025	— (V)	—	29%	23%	37%	—	11%
Texas Southern University	August 6–12, 2025	1,500 (LV)	± 2.5%	30%	22%	35%	—	13%
Stratus Intelligence (R)	July 16–18, 2025	— (V)	—	32%	15%	38%	15%	—
G1 Research	Late June 2025	—	—	28%	17%	41%	—	14%
Stratus Intelligence (R)	June 22–23, 2025	— (V)	—	28%	17%	41%	—	14%
Pulse Decision Science (R)	June 17–22, 2025	806 (LV)	± 3.5%	32%	13%	49%	—	7%
Stratus Intelligence (R)	June 8–10, 2025	— (V)	—	28%	12%	47%	—	13%
YouGov/Texas Southern University	May 9–19, 2025	510 (LV)	± 4.3%	27%	15%	34%	—	24%
Quantus Insights (R) (Note: Poll sponsored by Trending Politics, a conservative news website)	May 11–13, 2025	600 (RV)	± 4.4%	38%	16%	46%	—	
American Opportunity Alliance (R)	April 29 – May 1, 2025	800 (LV)	± 3.5%	27%	14%	43%	—	16%
Stratus Intelligence (R)	April 29–30, 2025	— (V)	—	27%	18%	40%	—	15%
The Tarrance Group (R)	April 27 – May 1, 2025	—	—	34%	19%	44%	—	
Stratus Intelligence (R)	April 15–17, 2025	— (V)	—	26%	18%	42%	—	14%
Stratus Intelligence (R)	March 23–25, 2025	— (V)	—	26%	13%	46%	—	15%

Hypothetical polling

John Cornyn vs. Ronny Jackson vs. Chip Roy

Poll source	Date(s) administered	Sample size	Margin of error	John Cornyn	Ronny Jackson	Chip Roy	Undecided
CWS Research (R) (Note: Poll conducted for the Defend Texas Liberty PAC)	October 19–23, 2022	823 (RV)	± 3.4%	35%	14%	18%	33%

John Cornyn vs. "Someone Else"

Poll source	Date(s) administered	Sample size	Margin of error	John Cornyn	Someone Else	Undecided
Victory Insights (R)	January 4–6, 2025	600 (LV)	± 4.0%	35%	40%	25%

==== Results ====
Results by county Cornyn: 30–40%; 40–50%; 50–60%; Paxton: 30–40%; 40–50%; 50–60%

Republican primary results
Party	Candidate	Votes	%
Republican	John Cornyn (incumbent)	910,382	42.0
Republican	Ken Paxton	878,564	40.5
Republican	Wesley Hunt	293,250	13.5
Republican	Sara Canady	26,355	1.2
Republican	Anna Bender	24,167	1.1
Republican	Gulrez Khan	15,873	0.7
Republican	John Adefope	9,284	0.4
Republican	Virgil Bierschwale	9,035	0.4
Total votes		2,166,910	100.0

Cornyn led Paxton narrowly in the primary election, garnering 42.0% of the vote to Paxton's 40.5%, while Hunt placed a distant third with 13.5% of the vote. Support for Cornyn and Paxton was relatively evenly spread across the state, though Cornyn performed slightly better in urban areas, especially Dallas and Austin, while Paxton performed slightly better in rural areas, particularly in East Texas. Hunt performed slightly better in regions which backed Paxton, suggesting his presence on the ballot hurt Cornyn more than Paxton. Even in Hunt's own congressional district, he came in third with barely over 20% of the vote.

In the days leading up to the March 3 primary, Paxton suggested he could win outright and avoid a runoff. However, Cornyn overperformed expectations in what The Texas Tribune described as a "better-than-expected showing". Rolando Garcia, a member of the State Republican Executive Committee who supported Hunt in the primary but planned to back Paxton in the runoff, said the result should alarm the Paxton campaign. On March 5, The Atlantic reported that Trump advisers expected the president to endorse Cornyn in the runoff election after his unexpectedly strong performance in the first round of voting.

=== Runoff ===
==== Campaign ====
Political observers described the runoff campaign between Paxton and Cornyn as "vile" and "brutal", featuring almost exclusively negative advertising from both sides. Cornyn repeatedly attacked Paxton's character, especially regarding alleged infidelity towards his wife, state senator Angela Paxton, who had filed for divorce on "biblical grounds", and compared his ethics to that of a "strip club owner." He also highlighted the political scandals that have plagued Paxton's career, including his 2023 impeachment by the Texas House of Representatives, framing him as corrupt and unfit for political office. Paxton continued to frame Cornyn as insufficiently loyal to Donald Trump. His office also drew scrutiny over a sharp increase in publicly-announced lawsuits made in his capacity as attorney general since announcing his Senate run and especially in the months immediately before the March primary. A sizeable number of these actions focused on issues salient to conservative voters, including immigration, Islam, DEI, student protests, and elections, drawing accusations that he used his office to energize his voter base and boost his campaign ahead of the runoff.

The runoff significantly fractured both the Republican electorate and officeholders in the state, many of whom worried that the money spent and political attacks exchanged during the contest could benefit Democratic nominee James Talarico. Talarico won his primary outright, avoiding a runoff and allowing him to shift his focus to the general election early. Lieutenant governor Dan Patrick even warned that a depressed Republican turnout could jeopardize Republican control of the Texas House, though most others dismissed that as extremely unlikely, with many Republicans still expressing confidence that both Paxton and Cornyn could win the general election.

Despite speculation following his first-place primary finish that Trump would endorse Cornyn, Trump did not endorse either candidate by the March 17 withdrawal deadline. Republicans had hoped the non-endorsed candidate would exit to avoid a costly runoff and allow the nominee to focus on the general election. However, Paxton refused to withdraw unless the Senate eliminated the filibuster to pass the SAVE America Act. Meanwhile, Cornyn, previously a staunch defender of the filibuster, signaled openness to reforming or bypassing it, as Trump indicated his endorsement could hinge on the bill's passage. Both candidates continued to court Trump's endorsement to consolidate support from the party, but Trump remained neutral in the race over two months after initially signaling his intention to endorse one of them. This jockeying included policy-related moves as well as superficial ones, such as a bill introduced by Cornyn to designate U.S. Route 287 as Interstate 47 to honor Trump.

On May 19, one week before the runoff, Trump announced his endorsement of Ken Paxton. U.S. representative Wesley Hunt, who finished third in the first round of the primary, also endorsed Paxton that day.

Following the runoff, Cornyn indicated tacit support for Paxton, saying he would vote for him and would back the Republican ticket but would not actively campaign for him.

==== Runoff endorsements ====
John Cornyn

Executive branch officials

- Mike Pompeo, former U.S. secretary of state (2018–2021)

U.S. representatives

- Newt Gingrich, former speaker of the House (1995–1999) from GA-06 (1979–1999)
- Louie Gohmert, former TX-01 (2005–2023)
- Nathaniel Moran, TX-01 (2023–present)
- Pete Sessions, TX-17 (2021–present) and former TX-32 (1997–2019)
- Randy Weber, TX-14 (2013–present)
- Roger Williams, TX-25 (2013–present)

State legislators

- Robert Nichols, SD-03 (2007–present)
- Charles Perry, president pro tempore of the Texas Senate (2025–present) from SD-28 (2014–present)
- 15 current state representatives (Note: Jeffrey Barry, HD-29 (2025–present); Brad Buckley, HD-54 (2019–present); Angie Chen Button, HD-112 (2009–present); Pat Curry, HD-56 (2024–present); Mano DeAyala, HD-133 (2023–present); Sam Harless, HD-126 (2019–present); Cody Harris, HD-08 (2019–present); Ken King, HD-88 (2013–present); Jeff Leach, HD-67 (2013–present); Janie Lopez, HD-37 (2023–present); Morgan Meyer, HD-108 (2015–present); Candy Noble, HD-89 (2019–present); Matt Shaheen, HD-89 (2015–present); Gary VanDeaver, HD-01 (2015–present); Denise Villalobos, HD-34 (2025–present))

Labor unions

- Seafarers International Union-AGLIWD

Newspapers

- Austin American-Statesman
- Dallas Morning News
- Fort Worth Star-Telegram
- Houston Chronicle
- San Antonio Express-News
Ken Paxton

Executive branch officials

- Donald Trump, president of the United States (2017–2021, 2025–present)
- JD Vance, vice president of the United States (2025–present)

U.S. representatives

- Eric Burlison, MO-07 (2023–present)
- Eli Crane, AZ-02 (2023–present) (previously endorsed Hunt)
- Brandon Gill, TX-26 (2025–present)
- Wesley Hunt, TX-38 (2023–present) and former candidate for this seat
- Ronny Jackson, TX-13 (2021–present)
- Burgess Owens, UT-04 (2021–present)

State legislators

- 2 state senators (Note: Donna Campbell, SD-25 (2013–present); Bob Hall, SD-02 (2015–present))
- 17 state representatives (Note: Mark Dorazio, HD-122 (2023–present); Richard Hayes, HD-57 (2023–present); Janis Holt, HD-18 (2025–present); Andy Hopper, HD-64 (2025–present); Helen Kerwin, HD-58 (2025–present); Marc LaHood, HD-121 (2025–present); Mitch Little, HD-65 (2025–present); David Lowe, HD-91 (2025–present); Shelley Luther, HD-62 (2025–present); Brent Money, HD-02 (2025–present); Mike Olcott, HD-60 (2025–present); Katrina Pierson, HD-33 (2025–present); Keresa Richardson, HD-61 (2025–present); Nate Schatzline, HD-93 (2023–present); Joanne Shofner, HD-11 (2025–present); Tony Tinderholt, HD-94 (2015–present); Steve Toth, HD-15 (2013–2015, 2019–present))
- Matt Rinaldi, former HD-115 (2015–2019) and chair of the Texas Republican Party (2021–2024)

Individuals

- Dan K. Eberhart, businessman
- Laura Loomer, political activist and conspiracy theorist

Organizations

- Conservative Political Action Conference
- Political Victory Fund

==== Fundraising ====
Campaign finance reports as of May 6, 2026
Candidate	Raised	Spent	Cash on hand
John Cornyn (R)	$13,574,708	$10,130,088	$4,078,081
Ken Paxton (R)	$7,600,511	$5,257,561	$2,342,950
Source: Federal Election Commission

==== Polling ====
Aggregate polls

Source of poll aggregation	Dates administered	Dates updated	John Cornyn	Ken Paxton	Undecided	Margin
FiftyPlusOne	through May 23, 2026	May 26, 2026	40.9%	50.3%	8.8%	Paxton +9.4%
RealClearPolitics	through May 21, 2026	May 24, 2026	41.0%	48.8%	10.2%	Paxton +7.8%
270toWin	through May 25, 2026	May 26, 2026	42.7%	51.0%	6.3%	Paxton +8.3%
Decision Desk HQ	through May 21, 2026	May 24, 2026	38.5%	53.5%	8.0%	Paxton +15.0%
Race to the White House	through May 22, 2026	May 24, 2026	38.9%	52.8%	8.3%	Paxton +13.9%
Average			40.4%	51.3%	8.3%	Paxton +10.9%

Poll source	Date(s) administered	Sample size	Margin of error	John Cornyn	Ken Paxton	Other	Undecided
Quantus Insights (R)	May 21–23, 2026	1,018 (LV)	± 3.5%	43%	53%	—	4%
SoCal Strategies (R)	May 20–21, 2026	700 (LV)	—	35%	57%	—	8%
	May 19, 2026	Trump and Hunt endorse Paxton					
Global Strategy Group (D) (Note: Poll sponsored by Giffords)	May 6–11, 2026	600 (LV)	± 4.0%	40%	52%	—	8%
Remington Research Group (R)	May 3–5, 2026	1,810 (LV)	± 2.6%	36%	47%	—	17%
Peak Insights (R)	May 2–5, 2026	800 (LV)	± 3.0%	47%	46%	7%	
University of Houston	April 28 – May 1, 2026	1,200 (LV)	± 2.8%	45%	48%	—	7%
co/efficient (R)	April 11–14, 2026	1,143 (LV)	± 3.1%	44%	43%	—	13%
Peak Insights (R)	April 6–9, 2026	800 (LV)	± 3.0%	44%	43%	—	13%
Texas Public Opinion Research	April 6–7, 2026	1,225 (LV)	± 3.2%	40%	48%	—	11%
Quantus Insights (R)	March 21–23, 2026	1,218 (LV)	± 2.8%	41%	49%	—	10%
GQR (D)	March 19–23, 2026	600 (LV)	± 4.0%	42%	47%	—	11%
Change Research (D)	March 17–19, 2026	807 (RV)	± 3.5%	39%	42%	—	19%
Impact Research (D) (Note: Poll sponsored by Talarico's campaign)	March 12–17, 2026	— (LV)	—	37%	53%	—	10%
Peak Insights (R)	March 9–12, 2026	800 (LV)	± 3.0%	45%	45%	—	10%
Slingshot Strategies (D) (Note: Poll sponsored by Texas Public Opinion Research)	March 7–8, 2026	781 (LV)	± 3.9%	41%	49%	—	10%
Harper Polling (R)	March 6–8, 2026	500 (LV)	± 4.4%	39%	43%	—	18%
Public Policy Polling (D) (Note: Poll commissioned by the Texas Justice Fund)	March 5–6, 2026	565 (LV)	± 4.1%	42%	45%	—	12%
	March 3, 2026	Cornyn and Paxton advance to runoff					
Peak Insights (R)	February 23–26, 2026	800 (LV)	± 3.0%	44%	47%	—	9%
Peak Insights (R)	February 22–25, 2026	800 (LV)	± 3.0%	44%	46%	—	10%
Blueprint Polling (D)	February 23–24, 2026	529 (LV)	± 5.3%	36%	49%	—	15%
Peak Insights (R)	February 21–24, 2026	800 (LV)	± 3.0%	43%	47%	—	10%
Peak Insights (R)	February 19–23, 2026	800 (LV)	± 3.0%	42%	49%	—	9%
Peak Insights (R)	February 16–19, 2026	800 (LV)	± 3.0%	39%	50%	—	11%
McLaughlin & Associates (R)	February 9–12, 2026	800 (LV)	± 3.5%	38%	50%	—	12%
J.L. Partners (R)	January 31 – February 3, 2026	600 (LV)	± 4.0%	40%	41%	—	19%
University of Houston/YouGov	January 20–31, 2026	550 (LV)	± 4.2%	40%	51%	—	9%
Harper Polling (R)	January 5–7, 2026	600 (LV)	± 4.0%	33%	44%	—	23%
McLaughlin & Associates (R)	December 1–4, 2025	800 (LV)	± 3.4%	40%	44%	—	12%
Public Policy Polling (D)	December 1–2, 2025	527 (LV)	—	34%	44%	—	22%
Ragnar Research Partners (R)	November 13–16, 2025	758 (LV)	± 4.0%	45%	41%	—	14%
Stratus Intelligence (R)	November 4–6, 2025	811 (LV)	± 4.6%	38%	46%	—	16%
Harper Polling (R)	October 28–30, 2025	614 (LV)	± 4.0%	36%	39%	—	25%
Stratus Intelligence (R)	October 4–6, 2025	— (V)	—	43%	46%	—	11%
University of Houston/ Texas Southern University	September 19 – October 1, 2025	576 (RV)	± 4.1%	44%	43%	—	13%
UT Tyler	September 17–24, 2025	493 (RV)	—	39%	37%	—	23%
Ragnar Research Partners (R)	September 20–22, 2025	— (V)	± 3.6%	39%	39%	—	22%
Stratus Intelligence (R)	September 14–16, 2025	— (V)	—	44%	44%	—	12%
Texas Public Opinion Research	August 27–29, 2025	320 (RV)	—	32%	26%	13% (Note: "Would not vote in that race" with 9%; "Prefer not to answer" with 4%)	29%
co/efficient (R)	August 25–27, 2025	818 (LV)	± 3.4%	36%	39%	—	25%
Stratus Intelligence (R)	August 24–26, 2025	— (V)	—	41%	48%	—	11%
Echelon Insights	August 21–24, 2025	515 (LV)	± 4.5%	37%	42%	—	21%
Emerson College	August 11–12, 2025	491 (RV)	± 4.4%	30%	29%	5% (Note: "Someone else" with 5%)	36%
Texas Southern University	August 6–12, 2025	1,500 (LV)	± 2.5%	39%	44%	—	17%
Stratus Intelligence (R)	August 4–6, 2025	— (V)	—	42%	45%	—	13%
Stratus Intelligence (R)	July 16–18, 2025	— (V)	—	36%	47%	—	17%
Pulse Decision Science (R)	June 17–22, 2025	806 (LV)	± 3.5%	38%	57%	—	5%
Stratus Intelligence (R)	June 8–10, 2025	— (V)	—	33%	49%	—	18%
UT Tyler	May 28 – June 7, 2025	538 (RV)	—	34%	44%	—	22%
Stratus Intelligence (R) (Note: Poll commissioned by the Conservative Policy Project)	June 6–8, 2025	600 (LV)	± 4.0%	33%	49%	—	18%
UpONE Insights (R) (Note: Poll sponsored by the Educational Freedom Institute)	May 27–28, 2025	600 (V)	± 4.0%	28%	50%	—	21%
YouGov/Texas Southern University	May 9–19, 2025	510 (LV)	± 4.3%	34%	43%	—	23%
Quantus Insights (R)	May 11–13, 2025	600 (RV)	± 4.4%	39%	52%	—	9%
American Opportunity Alliance (R)	April 29 – May 1, 2025	800 (LV)	± 3.5%	35%	52%	—	13%
The Tarrance Group (R)	April 27 – May 1, 2025	—	—	40%	56%	—	—
Stratus Intelligence (R)	April 29–30, 2025	— (V)	—	33%	48%	—	19%
Stratus Intelligence (R)	April 15–17, 2025	— (V)	—	33%	50%	—	17%
Internal Republican Party poll	Mid–April 2025	605 (V)	—	33%	50%	—	17%
Stratus Intelligence (R)	March 23–25, 2025	— (V)	—	35%	52%	—	13%
Lake Research Partners (D)/ Slingshot Strategies (D)	March 7–10, 2025	— (RV)	—	27%	38%	19% (Note: Would not Vote with 8%; Other with 7%; Refused with 4%)	16%
Fabrizio, Lee & Associates (R)	January 28 – February 2, 2025	— (V)	—	28%	53%	—	19%
Victory Insights (R)	January 4–6, 2025	600 (LV)	± 4.0%	34%	42%	—	25%
CWS Research (R)	July 9–10, 2022	1,918 (RV)	± 2.2%	31%	51%	—	18%

Hypothetical runoff polling

John Cornyn vs. Wesley Hunt

Poll source	Date(s) administered	Sample size	Margin of error	John Cornyn	Wesley Hunt	Undecided
Blueprint Polling (D)	February 23–24, 2026	529 (LV)	± 5.3%	42%	37%	21%
McLaughlin & Associates (R)	February 9–12, 2026	800 (LV)	± 3.5%	38%	48%	25%
J.L. Partners (R)	January 31 – February 3, 2026	600 (LV)	± 4.0%	33%	44%	23%
University of Houston/YouGov	January 20–31, 2026	550 (LV)	± 4.2%	46%	39%	15%
McLaughlin & Associates (R)	December 1–4, 2025	800 (LV)	± 3.4%	35%	50%	15%
Public Policy Polling (D)	December 1–2, 2025	527 (LV)	—	28%	45%	27%
University of Houston/ Texas Southern University	September 19 – October 1, 2025	576 (RV)	± 4.1%	50%	34%	16%
Stratus Intelligence (R)	September 14–16, 2025	842 (V)	—	37%	46%	17%
YouGov/Texas Southern University	May 9–19, 2025	510 (LV)	± 4.3%	39%	31%	30%

Ken Paxton vs. Wesley Hunt

Poll source	Date(s) administered	Sample size	Margin of error	Ken Paxton	Wesley Hunt	Undecided
Blueprint Polling (D)	February 23–24, 2026	529 (LV)	± 5.3%	53%	29%	18%
McLaughlin & Associates (R)	February 9–12, 2026	800 (LV)	± 3.5%	44%	42%	14%
J.L. Partners (R)	January 31 – February 3, 2026	600 (LV)	± 4.0%	34%	44%	22%
University of Houston/YouGov	January 20–31, 2026	550 (LV)	± 4.2%	56%	33%	11%
Harper Polling (R)	January 5–7, 2026	600 (LV)	± 4.0%	44%	33%	23%
McLaughlin & Associates (R)	December 1–4, 2025	800 (LV)	± 3.4%	39%	45%	16%
Harper Polling (R)	October 28–30, 2025	614 (LV)	± 4.0%	38%	34%	28%
University of Houston/ Texas Southern University	September 19 – October 1, 2025	576 (RV)	± 4.1%	50%	35%	15%
YouGov/Texas Southern University	May 9–19, 2025	510 (LV)	± 4.3%	45%	25%	30%

==== Results ====
Runoff results by county Paxton: 50–60%; 60–70%; 70–80%; 80–90%; Cornyn: 50–60%; 70–80%; Tie: 50%

Republican primary runoff results
Party	Candidate	Votes	%
Republican	Ken Paxton	888,196	63.8
Republican	John Cornyn (incumbent)	503,438	36.2
Total votes		1,391,634	100.0

Paxton defeated Cornyn with 64% of the runoff vote, becoming the first challenger to defeat an incumbent senator in a primary election in the state since Lloyd Bentsen defeated Ralph Yarborough in 1970. Cornyn became the second senator in the 2026 election cycle to lose renomination, after Bill Cassidy in Louisiana. His loss largely mirrored Cassidy's, performing best in the state's most Democratic-leaning areas, as well as wealthier suburban areas. Excluding sparsely populated Kenedy County, Cornyn only won Travis County, home to the state capital Austin, a heavily left-leaning area, while narrowly losing Dallas County, home to the wealthy Park Cities and Southern Methodist University. Paxton's runoff performance was the largest for a second-place finisher in a U.S. Senate primary in Texas, eclipsing Charles A. Culberson's previous record in 1916.

== Democratic primary ==
U.S. Representative Jasmine Crockett finished second in the Democratic primary.

=== Background ===
Democrats, who had not won a statewide election in Texas since 1994, saw an opening in the state due to the bitter and divisive primary fight in the Republican side, a potential midterm backlash against the Trump administration, negative approval ratings for President Trump in Texas, as well as recent polling numbers showing competitive matchups.

Colin Allred, who unsuccessfully ran against incumbent Republican senator Ted Cruz in 2024, exited the race on December 8, 2025, which precipitated Jasmine Crockett's entry into the race.

=== Campaign ===
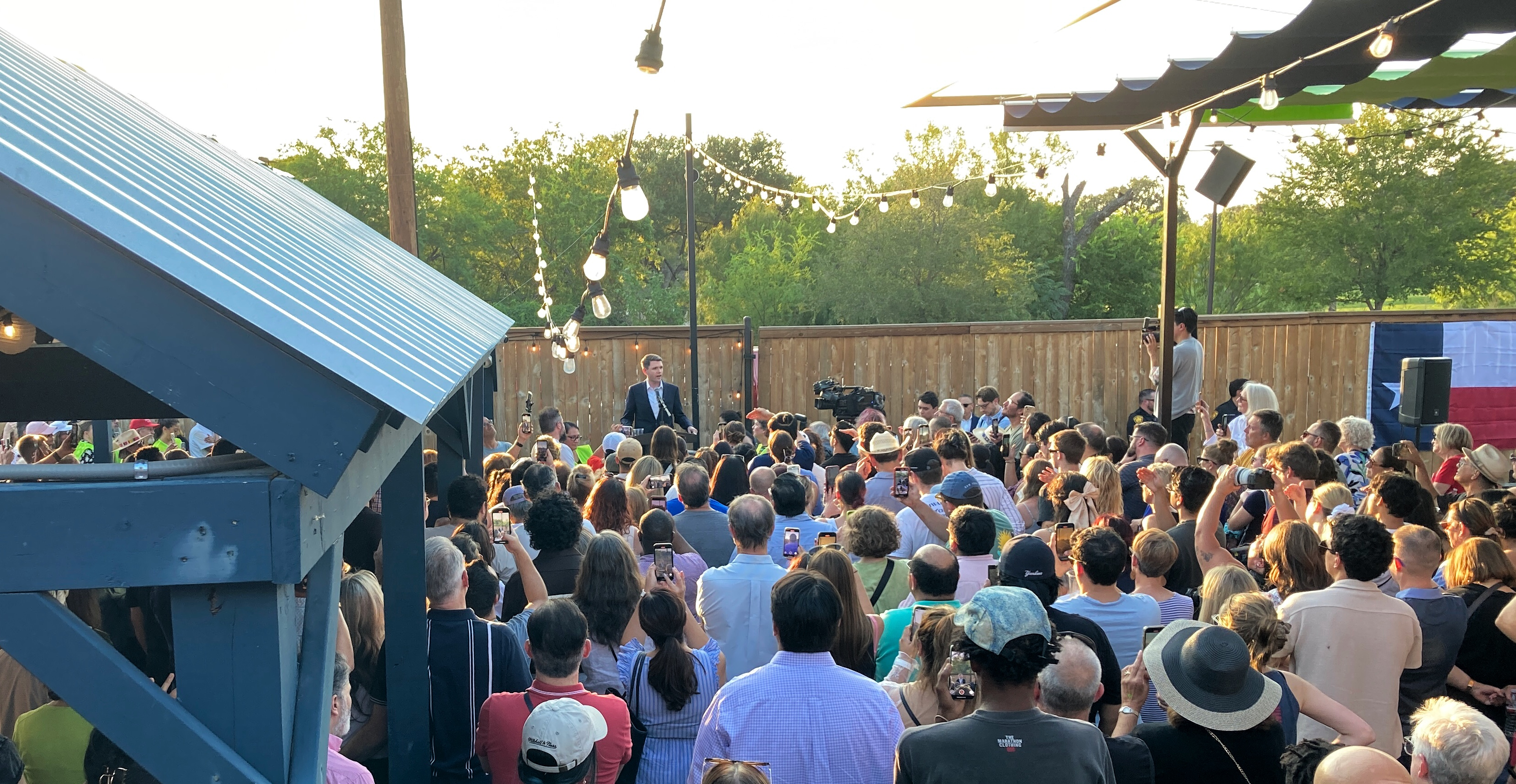
A Talarico rally at The Backyard in San Antonio

Crockett entered the race with high name recognition and strong polling numbers, but her launch on the last day to file meant she had limited time for campaigning statewide. According to polling data in February 2026 prior to the primaries, Crockett originally had a favorability percentage of 23%, and an unfavorable percentage of 25% while Talarico came in at 18% favorable and 9% unfavorable. She did not hire a campaign manager, and focused on advertising over a staffed field operation.

Crockett and Talarico participated in a debate on January 24, 2026, hosted by the AFL-CIO in Georgetown. During the debate, both candidates largely aligned on policy and engaged in limited direct attacks. Crockett defended her "firebrand" style as necessary for the political moment, while Talarico emphasized a more measured approach and his perceived electability against Ken Paxton. Talarico later faced controversy after a social media influencer alleged he had referred to former rival Colin Allred as a "mediocre Black man" in comparison to Crockett in a private conversation. Talarico disputed the claim as a "mischaracterization," stating that he was addressing his "method of campaigning" and that he "would never attack him on the basis of race." Allred subsequently endorsed Crockett and criticized Talarico. The episode further exposed the racial tension between each candidate's base of support, with Crockett performing best among Black voters, Democrats' strongest voter base, and Talarico performing best among White and Latino voters, demographics which hold far more swing voters.

On February 16, Talarico was scheduled to appear on The Late Show with Stephen Colbert. According to Colbert, however, CBS did not allow him to air the interview nor mention the cancellation on-air based on a recently revised interpretation of the FCC's equal-time rule, although he did discuss it during that night's episode in spite of FCC threats. Colbert later posted the interview to the show's YouTube page. The interview gained millions of views online, while Talarico fundraised $2.5 million in the aftermath and increased his name recognition as early voting began ahead of the March 3 primary. Analysts largely viewed the campaign as one based on personality and electability rather than ideology. A few months later in September 2026, Talarico was again pulled from a scheduled appearance on a late night show, (Jimmy Kimmel Live!), which host Jimmy Kimmel also attributed to the FCC. As with Colbert, Kimmel instead posted the interview to the show's YouTube channel.

After the primary, Crockett conceded to Talarico, announcing support for his candidacy, but she declined to actively campaign for him.

=== Candidates ===
==== Nominee ====
- James Talarico, state representative from the 50th district (2018–present)

==== Eliminated in primary ====
- Jasmine Crockett, U.S. representative from Texas's 30th congressional district (2023–present)
- Ahmad R. Hassan, real estate broker, attorney and perennial candidate

==== Withdrawn ====
- Colin Allred, former U.S. representative from Texas's 32nd congressional district (2019–2025) and nominee for U.S. Senate in 2024 (ran for U.S. House; endorsed Crockett in the primary and Talarico in the general)
- Emily Morgul, administrative assistant
- Michael Swanson, waiter
- Terry Virts, retired United States Air Force pilot and NASA astronaut (ran for U.S. House)
- Paula Williams, realtor

==== Declined ====
- Joaquin Castro, U.S. representative from Texas's 20th congressional district (2013–present) (ran for re-election)
- Veronica Escobar, U.S. representative from Texas's 16th congressional district (2019–present) (ran for re-election)
- Clay Jenkins, Dallas County judge (Note: County executive) (2011–present)
- Marc Veasey, U.S. representative from Texas's 33rd congressional district (2013–present) (endorsed Allred)

=== Endorsements ===
Jasmine Crockett

Executive branch officials

- Kamala Harris, former vice president of the United States (2021–2025) (endorsed Talarico in the general election)

U.S. senators

- Angela Alsobrooks, Maryland (2025–present)

U.S. representatives

- Colin Allred, former TX-32 (2019–2025), 2024 senate nominee (endorsed Talarico in the general election)
- Adelita Grijalva, AZ-7 (2025–present)
- Ro Khanna, CA-17 (2017–present)
- LaMonica McIver, NJ-10 (2024–present)
- Christian Menefee, TX-18 (2026–present) (endorsed Talarico in the general election)
- Ayanna Pressley, MA-7 (2019–present)
- Bonnie Watson Coleman, NJ-12 (2015–present)

State legislators

- Rodney Ellis, former SD-13 (1990–2017) (endorsed Talarico in the general election)
- Barbara Gervin-Hawkins, HD-120 (2017–present) (previously endorsed Allred)
- Christian Manuel, HD-22 (2023–present) (previously endorsed Talarico)

Local officials

- Ras Baraka, mayor of Newark (2014–present)

Individuals

- Cardi B, rapper
- Method Man, rapper
- Kelly Rowland, singer-songwriter
- Kerry Washington, actress

Labor unions

- Service Employees International Union Texas

Organizations

- Congressional Black Caucus PAC
- Elect Democratic Women
- EMILYs List
- March On

Newspapers

- San Antonio Express-News
James Talarico

U.S. senators

- Martin Heinrich, New Mexico (2013–present)

U.S. representatives

- Julie Johnson, TX-32 (2025–present)

State officials

- 4 members of the Texas State Board of Education (Note: Rebecca Bell-Metereau; Staci Childs; Tiffany Clark; Gustavo Reveles)

State legislators

- Sarah Eckhardt, SD-14 (2021–present)
- Roland Gutierrez, SD-19 (2021–present)
- 28 state representatives (Note: Diego Bernal, HD-123 (2015–present); John Bryant, HD-114 (2023–present) and former TX-05 (1983–1997); John Bucy III, HD-136 (2019–present); Elizabeth Campos, HD-119 (2021–present); Terry Canales, HD-40 (2013–present); Sheryl Cole, HD-46 (2019–present); Philip Cortez, HD-117 (2017–present); Aicha Davis, HD-109 (2025–present); Lulu Flores, HD-51 (2023–present); Erin Gamez, HD-38 (2022–present); Josey Garcia, HD-124 (2023–present); Linda Garcia, HD-107 (2025–present); Cassandra Hernandez, HD-115 (2025–present); Donna Howard, HD-48 (2006–present); Ann Johnson, HD-134 (2021–present); Ray Lopez, HD-125 (2019–present); Mando Martinez, HD-39 (2005–present); Terry Meza, HD-105 (2019–present); Christina Morales, HD-145 (2019–present); Eddie Morales, HD-74 (2021–present); Penny Morales Shaw, HD-148 (2021–present); Claudia Ordaz, HD-79 (2023–present); Mary Ann Perez, HD-144 (2017–present); Vincent Perez, HD-77 (2025–present); Ramon Romero Jr., HD-90 (2015–present); Lauren Ashley Simmons, HD-146 (2025–present); Armando Walle, HD-140 (2009–present); Erin Zwiener, HD-45 (2019–present))
- ~~Christian Manuel, HD-22 (2023–present)~~ (switched endorsement to Crockett)

Local officials

- Kirk Watson, mayor of Austin (1997–2001, 2023–present)

Individuals

- Jackson Browne, singer
- Brad Garrett, comedian and actor
- Olivia Julianna, political activist
- Dave Matthews, singer
- Richard Plepler, media executive
- Bobby Pulido, Tejano musician and Democratic candidate for TX-15 in 2026
- Nancy Wilson, guitartist and singer
- Noah Wyle, actor

Labor unions

- International Brotherhood of Electrical Workers Local 278
- Southern Regional Council of Carpenters

Organizations

- College Democrats of America
- High School Democrats of America
- Houston LGBTQ+ Political Caucus
- Progressive Change Campaign Committee
- State Tejano Democrats
- Texas A&M College Democrats
- University of Texas at Austin College Democrats

Newspapers

- Austin American-Statesman
- The Austin Chronicle
- Dallas Morning News
- Fort Worth Star-Telegram
- Houston Chronicle
Colin Allred (withdrawn)

Executive branch officials

- Ron Kirk, former mayor of Dallas (1995–2002) and former U.S. trade representative (2009–2013)

U.S. representatives

- Sanford Bishop, GA-02 (1993–present)
- Yvette Clarke, NY-09 (2007–present)
- Lizzie Fletcher, TX-07 (2019–present) (endorsed Talarico in the general election)
- Steven Horsford, NV-04 (2013–2015, 2019–present)
- Gregory Meeks, NY-05 (1998–present)
- Joe Neguse, CO-02 (2019–present)
- Lauren Underwood, IL-14 (2019–present)
- Marc Veasey, TX-33 (2013–present)

State legislators

- Alma Allen, HD-131 (2005–present)
- Rhetta Bowers, HD-113 (2019–present)
- ~~Barbara Gervin-Hawkins, HD-120 (2017–present)~~ (endorsed Crockett after Allred withdrew)
- Venton Jones, HD-100 (2023–present)
- Toni Rose, HD-110 (2013–present) (endorsed Talarico in the general election)
Declined to endorse

U.S. representatives

- Beto O'Rourke, former TX-16 (2013–2019) and nominee for U.S. Senate in 2018 (endorsed Talarico in the general election)

Labor unions

- Texas AFL-CIO (endorsed Talarico in the general election)

=== Debates ===
2026 Texas Democratic Senate primary debates
No.	Date	Host	Moderator	Link	Participants		
P Participant A Absent N Non-invitee I Invitee W Withdrawn							
P Participant A Absent N Non-invitee I Invitee W Withdrawn					Crockett	Hassan	Talarico
1	January 24, 2026	Texas AFL-CIO	Daniel Marin; Gromer Jeffers	KXAN-TV	P	N	P

=== Fundraising ===
Campaign finance reports as of February 11, 2026
Candidate	Raised	Spent	Cash on hand
Jasmine Crockett (D)	$8,577,757	$5,092,872	$3,484,885
James Talarico (D)	$20,694,809	$15,906,718	$4,788,090
Source: Federal Election Commission

=== Polling ===
Aggregate polls

Source of poll aggregation	Dates administered	Dates updated	Jasmine Crockett	James Talarico	Other/Undecided	Margin
270toWin	February 2 – March 2, 2026	March 2, 2026	47.6%	47.6%	4.8%	Tied
Decision Desk HQ	through March 2, 2026	March 2, 2026	45.6%	48.5%	8.6%	Talarico +2.9%
FiftyPlusOne	through March 2, 2026	March 2, 2026	45.7%	46.2%	8.1%	Talarico +0.5%
Average			46.3%	47.4%	6.3%	Talarico +1.1%

Poll source	Date(s) administered	Sample size	Margin of error	Colin Allred	Jasmine Crockett	James Talarico	Other	Undecided
YouGov	February 26 – March 2, 2026	2,408 (LV)	± 2.7%	—	40%	53%	0% (Note: Hassan, "I [did/will] not vote in this primary", and "Someone else" with 0%)	7%
Emerson College	February 26–27, 2026	850 (LV)	± 3.3%	—	47%	52%	1% (Note: Hassan with 1%)	—
Public Policy Polling (D) (Note: Poll sponsored by Lone Star Rising PAC, which supports Talarico)	February 25, 2026	599 (LV)	± 4.0%	—	42%	48%	0% (Note: Hassan with 0%)	10%
Blueprint Polling (D)	February 23–24, 2026	472 (LV)	± 4.5%	—	40%	52%	2% (Note: "Did not vote in this race" and "Do not remember" with 1%; Hassan with 0%)	6%
UT Tyler	February 13–22, 2026	488 (LV)	—	—	55%	37%	4% (Note: Hassan with 4%)	4%
UT Tyler	February 13–22, 2026	548 (RV)	—	—	56%	34%	7% (Note: Hassan with 7%)	3%
	February 16, 2026	Talarico is interviewed by Stephen Colbert						
University of Texas/ Texas Politics Project	February 2–16, 2026	369 (RV)	± 5.1%	—	56%	44%	—	
Impact Research (D)	February 10–12, 2026	800 (LV)	± 3.5%	—	43%	47%	10%	
University of Houston/YouGov	January 20–31, 2026	550 (LV)	± 4.2%	—	47%	39%	2% (Note: Hassan with 2%)	12%
Slingshot Strategies (D)	January 14–21, 2026	1,290 (LV)	± 3.7%	—	38%	37%	4% (Note: "Would not vote in that race" with 4%)	21%
HIT Strategies (D) (Note: Poll sponsored by Crockett's campaign)	January 6–15, 2026	1,005 (LV)	± 3.2%	—	46%	33%	—	21%
Emerson College	January 10–12, 2026	413 (LV)	± 4.8%	—	38%	47%	<1% (Note: Hassan at <1%)	15%
Texas Southern University	December 9–11, 2025	1,600 (LV)	± 2.5%	—	51%	43%	—	6%
	December 8, 2025	Allred withdraws from the race						
Impact Research (D)	December 3–4, 2025	— (LV)	—	—	52%	35%	13%	
University of Houston/ Texas Southern University	September 19 – October 1, 2025	478 (RV)	± 4.5%	—	52%	34%	—	14%
University of Houston/ Texas Southern University	September 19 – October 1, 2025	478 (RV)	± 4.5%	46%	—	42%	—	8%
Impact Research (D)	October 23–29, 2025	836 (LV)	± 3.5%	42%	—	48%	—	9%
UT Tyler	September 17–24, 2025	377 (RV)	—	42%	—	30%	4% (Note: "Someone else" with 4%)	24%
Public Policy Polling (D)	September 3–4, 2025	510 (LV)	± 4.3%	40%	—	32%	—	27%
Emerson College	August 11–12, 2025	370 (RV)	± 5.1%	58%	—	—	8% (Note: Morgul with 4%; Swanson with 3%; Virts with 1%)	34%
Texas Southern University	August 6–12, 2025	1,500 (LV)	± 2.5%	50%	—	43%	—	7%

Hypothetical polling

Poll source	Date(s) administered	Sample size	Margin of error	Colin Allred	James Talarico	Joaquin Castro	Jasmine Crockett	Beto O'Rourke	Other	Undecided
University of Houston/ Texas Southern University	September 19 – October 1, 2025	478 (RV)	± 4.5%	13%	25%	—	31%	25%	—	6%
University of Houston/ Texas Southern University	September 19 – October 1, 2025	478 (RV)	± 4.5%	34%	—	—	57%	—	—	9%
University of Houston/ Texas Southern University	September 19 – October 1, 2025	478 (RV)	± 4.5%	38%	—	—	—	55%	—	7%
University of Houston/ Texas Southern University	September 19 – October 1, 2025	478 (RV)	± 4.5%	—	—	—	51%	41%	—	8%
University of Houston/ Texas Southern University	September 19 – October 1, 2025	478 (RV)	± 4.5%	39%	—	—	54%	—	7%	
UT Tyler	September 17–24, 2025	377 (RV)	—	25%	—	13%	29%	31%	2% (Note: "Refused" with 2%)	—
Texas Public Opinion Research	August 27–29, 2025	270 (RV)	—	13%	7%	4%	26%	27%	5% (Note: "Would not vote in that race" with 5%)	18%
Texas Southern University	August 6–12, 2025	1,500 (LV)	± 2.5%	38%	—	—	—	58%	—	4%
Texas Southern University	August 6–12, 2025	1,500 (LV)	± 2.5%	52%	—	—	41%	—	—	7%
NRSC (R)	July 4–7, 2025	566 (LV)	± 3.0%	20%	—	13%	35%	13%	—	18%

=== Results ===
Results by county Talarico: 40–50%; 50–60%; 60–70%; 70–80%; 80–90%; >90%; Crockett: 40–50%; 50–60%; 60–70%; 70–80%; 80–90%; Talarico/Crockett Tie: 40–50%; 50%; Talarico/Hassan Tie: 50%

Results of the 2026 Democratic U.S. Senate primary by precinct in Dallas, Tarrant, Collin, and Denton counties. Talarico: 90–100%; 80–90%; 70–80%; 60–70%; 50–60%; 40–50%; Crockett: 90–100%; 80–90%; 70–80%; 60–70%; 50–60%; 40–50%; Hassan: 90–100%; Other: Tie at 50%; Tie below 50%; No votes; No data

Democratic primary results
Party	Candidate	Votes	%
Democratic	James Talarico	1,216,412	52.4
Democratic	Jasmine Crockett	1,071,900	46.2
Democratic	Ahmad Hassan	30,875	1.3
Total votes		2,319,187	100.0

James Talarico won the Democratic primary with 52.4% of the vote. After a dispute concerning voting hours in Dallas and Williamson Counties on the night of the primary, Crockett conceded the race on March 4. The dispute in Dallas County arose from the county Republican Party's decision not to use countywide voting centers, where voters can cast ballots at any location, on Election Day, as Texas law requires both parties to agree in order to implement them. On March 17, the Dallas County GOP announced it would use countywide voting centers for the runoff.

In Newton County, issues with a ballot scanning and tabulation machine led to the county clerk writing in a court filing that its Democratic statewide primary results, with Ahmad Hassan winning the county, were "skewed" and that a recount was required, which eventually had to be done by hand due to the scanning issues persisting. Revised results showed Crockett winning the county.

Democrats cast more primary votes in a midterm election than Republicans for the first time since 2002. The results largely mirrored those of the 2020 primary for this seat, which also pitted a Black Democrat from Dallas (Royce West) against a White Democrat from the Austin area (M. J. Hegar). Crockett performed best among Black voters, winning by large margins in East Texas, as well as by smaller margins in the urban centers of Dallas and Harris counties. Talarico won the White and Hispanic vote, dominating in the Austin metro area, and winning the state's remaining rural areas, including the heavily-Hispanic Rio Grande Valley.

== Libertarian convention ==
The Libertarian Party convention was held from April 10 to 12, 2026, in Abilene. Ted Brown, the party's U.S. Senate nominee in 2024, secured the nomination with 83 votes to Daniel Mark Sims's 39.

=== Candidates ===
==== Nominee ====
- Ted Brown, insurance adjuster, former chair of the Libertarian Party of California, and nominee in 2024

==== Eliminated at convention ====
- Daniel Mark Sims, software company founder

=== Results ===
Libertarian convention results
Party	Candidate	Votes	%
Libertarian	Ted Brown	83	64.3
Libertarian	Daniel Mark Sims	39	30.2
	None of the above	7	5.4
Total votes		129	100.0

== General election ==
=== Campaign ===
Following the May Republican runoff, both nominees quickly pivoted to the general election. Paxton's victory was welcomed by Democrats who viewed him as a weaker opponent, leading several nonpartisan forecasters to rate the race as more competitive. Talarico adopted a more aggressive strategy, highlighting allegations that led to Paxton's impeachment by fellow Republicans.

==== Economy ====
Both Talarico and Paxton launched campaigns related to economic issues: Talarico's economic plan was named the "New American Dream," while Paxton's was named "Protecting the Texas Promise". Talarico's plan supported raising the minimum wage, canceling medical debt, and passing universal childcare and paid family leave. Paxton's supported tax deductions for healthcare, housing, and family-related expenses.

==== Social and legal issues ====
Paxton portrayed Talarico as an extremist, emphasizing culture war issues and gender, while criticizing his statement that "God is non-binary" and questioning his masculinity. Paxton also repeatedly called Talarico a vegan, claiming "you can't get elected as a vegan in Texas," prompting Talarico to release photos and videos of himself eating meat and other animal product foods at campaign events. In June, Talarico criticized the Attorney General's office over its handling of a child sexual abuse case involving former attorney Adam Hoffman during Paxton's tenure. After a mistrial, Hoffman received a plea deal critics called "unusually lenient" and an "Epstein-style sweetheart deal," as it did not require him to register as a sex offender. Talarico and John Cornyn had previously aired campaign ads criticizing Paxton over the case.

==== Party unification ====
Both Talarico and Paxton faced challenges unifying their parties after the primaries, with limited support from former rivals exposing weaknesses in their coalitions. Talarico sought to bolster support among Black voters after defeating Jasmine Crockett, who skipped the state Democratic convention and declined to commit to campaigning for him, raising concerns about Black turnout. Paxton struggled with moderate Republicans who backed John Cornyn, with polls showing some Cornyn voters supporting Talarico. Cornyn also declined to fundraise for Paxton, instead focusing on competitive Senate races in other states.

In part to rally support behind candidates such as Paxton, the Republican Party hosted its first-ever midterm national convention in Dallas on September 9 and 10. After the midterm convention, Paxton said in a private conversation that the convention had a negative effect for the Republican Party.

==== Attempts of holding debate ====
On July 16, the Paxton and Talarico campaigns announced negotiations for up to three general election debates. Had they been held, it would have marked Paxton's first debates since becoming a statewide elected official. By September, Talarico had accepted a fourth invitation to a debate as Paxton had remained noncommittal, but insisted that they were still negotiating and expected to participate in at least one debate before the election. Responding to a challenge issued by Talarico to appear on the channel, a fifth debate invitation was issued by Fox News. In early October, president Donald Trump and several other prominent Republicans called on Paxton to debate Talarico. By late October, Paxton had declined all invitations to debate Talarico. Ultimately, no debates were held, marking the first Senate race in Texas since 2000 not to feature a debate between the major party candidates.

=== Election administration ===
The election took place amidst a broader push by the Trump administration to restrict mail-in voting, although these efforts were mired in court proceedings. On September 1, commissioners in Tarrant County, Texas's third-largest county, voted to close roughly a third of its polling locations, a year after cutting early-voting sites in half, citing cost savings at low-turnout locations. Critics warned the closures could increase travel times and suppress turnout. Later that month, Votebeat reported that the Department of Public Safety had failed to distribute nearly 200,000 voter registrations to counties over the course of the past year due to a technical error, sparking a bipartisan outcry. By the beginning of October, the reported size of the backlog had neared 600,000 registrations. The backlog was sent to counties all at once, with many of the state's urban counties receiving tens of thousands one month before early voting was set to begin. The state agreed to reimburse counties for the overtime pay incurred processing the glut of applications. Observers and election experts highlighted the debacle as an example of the difficulties involved in registering to vote in Texas, one of the only states in the country to not offer universal online voter registration.

=== Predictions ===
Source	Ranking	As of
ABC News	Lean D (flip)	November 3, 2026
CBS News	Tossup	October 30, 2026
The Cook Political Report	Tossup	November 2, 2026
Decision Desk HQ	Tossup	November 3, 2026
The Economist (Note: The Economist's prediction model uses unconventional terminology. For the purpose of equivalency, their "Very Likely" ratings are formatted as a "Likely" rating while "Likely" ratings are formatted as a "Lean" rating.)	Tossup	November 3, 2026
FiftyPlusOne	Lean D (flip)	November 3, 2026
Fox News	Tossup	November 1, 2026
Inside Elections	Tilt D (flip)	October 29, 2026
MS NOW	Tossup	October 29, 2026
NBC News	Tossup	November 3, 2026
RealClearPolitics	Tossup	November 2, 2026
Sabato's Crystal Ball	Lean D (flip)	November 2, 2026
Silver Bulletin	Likely D (flip)	November 3, 2026
Split Ticket	Likely D (flip)	November 2, 2026

=== Post-primary endorsements ===
Ken Paxton (R)

Executive branch officials

- Robert F. Kennedy Jr., secretary of health and human services (2025–present) (Independent)
- Elon Musk, former senior advisor to the president (2025) (Independent)
- Kristi Noem, former secretary of homeland security (2025–2026)
- Brooke Rollins, secretary of agriculture (2025–present)

U.S. senators

- Jim Banks, Indiana (2025–present)
- John Barrasso, Senate majority whip (2025–present) from Wyoming (2007–present)
- Tom Cotton, Arkansas (2015–present)
- Ted Cruz, Texas (2013–present)
- Mike Lee, Utah (2011–present)
- Bernie Moreno, Ohio (2025–present)
- Tim Scott, South Carolina (2013–present)
- Tim Sheehy, Montana (2025–present)
- John Thune, Senate majority leader (2025–present) from South Dakota (2005–present)

U.S. representatives

- Jodey Arrington, TX-19 (2017–present)
- Brian Babin, TX-36 (2015–present)
- Joe Barton, TX-06 (1985–2019)
- John Carter, TX-31 (2003–present)
- Michael Cloud, TX-27 (2018–present)
- Monica De La Cruz, TX-15 (2023–present)
- Pat Fallon, TX-4 (2021–present)
- Craig Goldman, TX-12 (2025–present)
- Darrell Issa, CA-48 (2021–present, 2001–2019)
- Nathaniel Moran, TX-1 (2023–present)
- August Pfluger, TX-11 (2021–present)
- Pete Sessions, TX-17 (2021–present)
- Beth Van Duyne, TX-24 (2021–present)
- Randy Weber, TX-14 (2013–present)
- Roger Williams, TX-25 (2013–present)

Statewide officials

- Greg Abbott, governor of Texas (2015–present)
- Don Huffines, Texas comptroller of public accounts (2026–present)
- Dan Patrick, lieutenant governor of Texas (2015–present)

State legislators

- Charles Anderson, HD-56 (2005–2024)
- Dustin Burrows, speaker of the House (2025–present) from HD-83 (2015–present)
- Briscoe Cain, HD-128 (2017–present)
- Giovanni Capriglione, HD-98 (2013–present)
- Brian Harrison, HD-10 (2021–present)
- Hillary Hickland, HD-55 (2025–present)
- Todd Ames Hunter, HD-32 (2009–present, 1993–1997)
- Jeff Leach, HD-67 (2013–present)
- Tan Parker, Majority Leader of the Texas Senate (2025–present, 2023) and SD-12 (2023–present)
- Angela Paxton, SD-08 (2019–present)
- Matt Shaheen, HD-66 (2015–present)
- Cody Vasut, HD-25 (2021–present)

Individuals

- Jack Brewer, former NFL player
- Tony Buzbee, lawyer
- Riley Gaines, political activist and former swimmer
- Enes Kanter Freedom, former NBA player
- Alex Latcham, political operative
- Zachary Levi, actor
- Tony Lyons, founder of Skyhorse Publishing
- Johnny Manziel, former NFL player
- Mark Teixeira, former MLB player and candidate for TX-21
- Randy White, former NFL player

Labor unions

- National Border Patrol Council

Organizations

- America First Works
- America PAC
- Club for Growth
- National Federation of Independent Business
- National Right to Life Committee
- NRA Political Victory Fund
- Safari Club International
- Senate Conservatives Fund
- Susan B. Anthony Pro-Life America
- Texas Farm Bureau
- Texas Patriots PAC
- U.S. Chamber of Commerce
- Young Conservatives of Texas
- Young Republicans of Texas

Newspapers and media

- Washington Reporter
James Talarico (D)

Executive branch officials

- Julian Castro, former secretary of housing and urban development (2014–2017)
- Kamala Harris, former vice president of the United States (2021–2025)
- Barack Obama, former president of the United States (2009–2017)

U.S. senators

- Chris Coons, Delaware (2010–present)
- Kirsten Gillibrand, New York (2009–present)
- Jon Ossoff, Georgia (2021–present)
- Adam Schiff, California (2024–present)
- Chuck Schumer, Senate minority leader (2017–2021, 2025–present) from New York (1999–present)
- Chris Van Hollen, Maryland (2017–present)

U.S. representatives

- Colin Allred, former TX-32 (2019–2025), 2024 U.S. Senate nominee, and former candidate for this seat
- Jake Auchincloss, MA-04 (2021–present)
- Greg Casar, TX-35 (2023–present)
- Jasmine Crockett, TX-30 (2023–present) and primary candidate for this seat
- Lizzie Fletcher, TX-07 (2019–present)
- Adam Kinzinger, former IL-16 (2013–2023) and IL-11 (2011–2013) (Republican)
- Gregory Meeks, NY-05 (1998–present)
- Christian Menefee, TX-18 (2026–present)
- Beto O'Rourke, former TX-16 (2013–2019), 2018 U.S. senate nominee and 2022 gubernatorial nominee
- Alan Steelman, former TX-05 (1973–1977) (Republican)

Statewide officials

- Deborah Hankinson, former justice of the Texas Supreme Court (1997–2002) (Republican)
- Thomas R. Phillips, former justice of the Texas Supreme Court (1988–2004) (Republican)
- JB Pritzker, governor of Illinois (2019–present)
- Andrew Sansom, former executive director of the Texas Parks and Wildlife Department (1990–2001) (Republican)

State legislators

- Jimmie Don Aycock, former HD-54 (2007–2017) (Republican)
- Rodney Ellis, former SD-13 (1990–2017)
- Gina Hinojosa, HD-49 (2017–present) and Democratic nominee for governor of Texas in 2026
- Susan King, former HD-71 (2007–2017) (Republican)
- Christian Manuel, HD-22 (2023–present)
- Bennett Ratliff, former HD-115 (2013–2015) (Republican)
- Toni Rose, HD-110 (2013–present)
- Kel Seliger, former SD-31 (2004–2023) (Republican)
- Royce West, SD-23 (1993–present) and candidate for this seat in 2020

Local officials

- Steve Bartlett, former mayor of Dallas (1991–1995) and former TX-03 (1983–1991) (Republican)
- Michael Bloomberg, former mayor of New York City (2002–2013)
- Jim Ross, mayor of Arlington (2021–present) (Independent)
- Glen Whitley, former Tarrant County judge (2007–2022) (Republican)

Individuals

- Jack Antonoff, singer and producer
- Beck Bennett, actor and comedian
- Connie Britton, actress
- Barbara Bush, daughter of President George W. Bush (Independent)
- Neil Bush, son of President George H. W. Bush (Republican)
- Mark Cuban, businessman (Independent)
- Matthew DeSarno, former FBI special agent
- Ethan Hawke, actor and filmmaker
- Don Henley, singer and musician
- Luci Baines Johnson, daughter of former president Lyndon B. Johnson
- Damon Lindelof, screenwriter and producer
- Eva Longoria, actress
- Los Tigres del Norte, band
- Martie Maguire, singer and musician
- Natalie Maines, singer and musician
- Kacey Musgraves, singer
- Willie Nelson, singer
- Bill Nye, television presenter and science communicator
- Adrianne Palicki, actress
- Jesse Plemons, actor
- Lionel Sosa, advertising executive (Republican)
- Emily Strayer, singer and musician
- Wayne Thorburn, former executive director of the Republican Party of Texas (Republican)
- Jordan Walker Ross, actor

Labor unions

- Actors' Equity Association
- American Federation of Government Employees
- American Federation of State, County and Municipal Employees, Local 1624
- American Federation of Teachers Texas
- Texas AFL-CIO
- United Auto Workers

Organizations

- Congressional Black Caucus
- Democrats for Education Reform
- End Citizens United
- Feminist Majority PAC
- Giffords
- Human Rights Campaign
- League of Conservation Voters
- Our Revolution
- People for the American Way
- Reproductive Freedom for All

Newspapers and media

- Austin American-Statesman
- Daily Kos
- The Dallas Morning News
- Houston Chronicle
- San Antonio Express-News
Declined to endorse

Executive branch officials

- Mike Pence, former vice president of the United States (2017–2021) (Republican)

U.S. senators

- John Cornyn, Texas (2002–present) and primary candidate for this seat (Republican)

State legislators

- Dade Phelan, former Speaker of the Texas House of Representatives (2021–2025) from HD-21 (2015–present) (Republican)

Local officials

- Betsy Price, former Mayor of Fort Worth (2011–2021) (Republican)

=== Fundraising ===
The race was one of the most expensive non-presidential electoral races in American history, and the most expensive race for the Senate. Talarico considerably outraised Paxton throughout the campaign. Due to the high national profile of the race, both candidates, especially Talarico, received significant contributions from voters across the country. Within Texas, Talarico's donation base was concentrated in his home city of Austin and the state's other urban areas, while Paxton's was in Dallas. The Talarico campaign raised $64 million in the third quarter of 2026, the largest quarterly total by a U.S. Senate candidate ever, surpassing the $57M record that had been set by Jaime Harrison in the 2020 South Carolina senate race. The principal Talarico campaign committee ultimately raised $146M, while the Talarico Victory Fund received $12M. Paxton's principal fundraising committee raised about $22M, while two affiliated committees raised about $16.5M in total.

Over the summer, in National Republican Senatorial Committee v. FEC, the Supreme Court cleared the way for political parties themselves to freely coordinate advertising spending with candidates at the candidates' reduced rate, handing Republicans a monetary advantage across the country due to the Democratic Party lagging behind the Republicans in party fundraising. Paxton received a massive infusion of political action committee (PAC) and political party spending to buoy his sagging polling numbers leading into the fall campaign season, particularly after the Republican National Convention in Dallas. In September, the Senate Leadership Fund committed over $100M to support Paxton, far exceeding Talarico's fundraising that month and representing a remarkably high investment to defend a seat in a state Republicans had not lost in over 30 years. Elon Musk donated $10M to Lone Star Liberty PAC, a super PAC that ultimately spent $25.9M supporting Paxton. By October, AdImpact data cited by Reuters put pro-Paxton spending at about $239M, against roughly $45M from major Democratic-aligned groups. Texas PAC, a Republican super PAC, accounted for nearly $149M of that advertising. Federal filings separately showed that Elon Musk gave $158M to the Senate Leadership Fund, which passed an equivalent sum to Texas PAC. The most generous super PAC that backed Talarico was Lone Star Rising PAC, which spent $21 million; a prominent backer was Reid Hoffman, cofounder of LinkedIn. Paxton's top supporters were the Musk-backed Texas PAC, which spent over $178M, the largest investment by any single organization involved in the race, followed by Make America Great Again Inc., Donald Trump's super PAC, with $40 million spent. Musk's total investment in support of Paxton amounted to over $200M.

Campaign finance reports as of October 14, 2026
Candidate	Raised	Spent	Cash on hand
Ken Paxton (R)	$22,327,474	$17,543,066	$4,784,408
James Talarico (D)	$146,349,912	$136,427,055	$9,922,857
Ted Brown (L)	$14,257	$13,037	$1,288
Source: Federal Election Commission

=== Polling ===
Talarico led in aggregate polling for much of the race, with his lead by the fall being the largest for any Senate Democrat in Texas since 1988.

View source data.

Aggregate polls

Source of poll aggregation	Dates administered	Dates updated	Ken Paxton (R)	James Talarico (D)	Other/ Undecided	Margin
270toWin	October 13 – November 2, 2026	November 3, 2026	46.4%	49.6%	4.0%	Talarico +3.2%
Decision Desk HQ	through November 1, 2026	November 3, 2026	46.0%	49.4%	5.4%	Talarico +3.4%
FiftyPlusOne	through November 2, 2026	November 3, 2026	45.8%	49.5%	4.7%	Talarico +3.7%
RealClearPolitics	October 15 – November 1, 2026	November 1, 2026	46.5%	49.1%	4.4%	Talarico +2.6%
The Texas Tribune	through November 1, 2026	November 2, 2026	46.1%	49.4%	4.5%	Talarico +3.3%
Silver Bulletin	through November 1, 2026	November 2, 2026	46.5%	49.8%	4.7%	Talarico +3.1%
Average			46.1%	49.4%	4.5%	Talarico +3.3%

Poll source (Note: Party affiliation labels according to The Texas Tribune)	Date(s) administered	Sample size	Margin of error	Ken Paxton (R)	James Talarico (D)	Ted Brown (L)	Other	Undecided
Research Co.	October 31 – November 2, 2026	450 (LV)	± 4.6%	46%	49%	1%	—	4%
Trafalgar Group (R)	October 31 – November 1, 2026	1,089 (LV)	± 2.9%	48%	48%	2%	—	2%
Emerson College (Note: Poll sponsored by Poll Vault, a Substack newsletter authored by Sean Trende)	October 31 – November 1, 2026	500 (LV)	—	48%	50%	2%	—	—
HarrisX	October 30 – November 1, 2026	512 (LV)	± 4.3%	44%	50%	—	4% (Note: "Another candidate" with 4%)	2%
AtlasIntel	October 28 – November 1, 2026	1,678 (LV)	± 2.0%	45%	51%	—	3% (Note: "Other" with 2%; "Would not vote" with 1%)	1%
New York Times/Siena University	October 27 – November 1, 2026	1,215 (LV)	± 3.4%	43%	50%	—	0% (Note: "Another candidate" with 0%)	6%
Kreate Strategies	October 27–30, 2026	900 (LV)	± 3.3%	45%	48%	0%	0%	6%
YouGov	October 26–29, 2026	2,141 (LV)	± 2.9%	47%	51%	—	2% (Note: "Someone else" with 1%; "Would not vote" with 1%)	1%
Quantus Insights	October 26–28, 2026	1,221 (LV)	± 3.2%	49%	48%	1%	—	2%
ActiVote	October 22–28, 2026	400 (LV)	± 4.9%	48%	52%	—	—	—
A2 Insights	October 23–27, 2026	631 (LV)	± 4.9%	47%	50%	—	2%	0%
SSRS (Note: Poll conducted for CNN)	October 20–27, 2026	923 (LV)	± 4.2%	43%	49%	—	5% (Note: "Neither" with 5%)	3%
Data for Progress (D)	October 23–26, 2026	712 (LV)	± 4.0%	45%	49%	2%	—	4%
YouGov Blue (D) (Note: Poll conducted on behalf of 254 Labs)	October 21–26, 2026	1,000 (RV)	± 4.6%	43%	51%	—	2%	5%
Texas Southern University	October 21–25, 2026	2,000 (LV)	± 2.2%	47%	49%	3%	—	1%
Rasmussen Reports	October 20–21, 2026	965 (LV)	± 3.0%	45%	45%	5%	—	5%
ActiVote	October 17–21, 2026	400 (LV)	± 4.9%	49%	51%	—	—	—
Univision/YouGov	October 13–21, 2026	1,000 (RV)	± 3.8%	45%	50%	—	1%	5%
Verasight/VoteHub	October 1–20, 2026	509 (LV)	± 4.3%	45% (Note: With voters who lean towards a given candidate)	48%	1%	—	5%
Verasight/VoteHub	October 1–20, 2026	509 (LV)	± 4.3%	41%	46%	4%	—	—
Verasight/VoteHub	October 1–20, 2026	517 (RV)	± 4.3%	45%	46%	2%	—	—
Verasight/VoteHub	October 1–20, 2026	517 (RV)	± 4.3%	41%	43%	5%	—	—
Emerson College	October 17–19, 2026	1,000 (LV)	± 3.0%	48%	49%	3%	—	—
Emerson College	October 17–19, 2026	1,000 (LV)	± 3.0%	46%	48%	1%	—	5%
Beacon Research (D)/ Shaw & Co. Research (R) (Note: Poll conducted for Fox News)	October 15–19, 2026	1,398 (LV)	± 2.5%	49%	49%	—	—	2%
Beacon Research (D)/ Shaw & Co. Research (R)	October 15–19, 2026	2,011 (RV)	± 2.0%	46%	52%	—	—	2%
Texas Public Opinion Research (D)	October 15–18, 2026	969 (LV)	± 3.9%	47%	51%	2%	—	—
Pollfinity Research	October 15–18, 2026	278 (RV)	± 6.5%	43%	48%	2%	2% (Note: "Someone else" with 2%)	5%
CBS News/YouGov	October 8–16, 2026	1,492 (LV)	± 3.5%	49%	51%	—	—	—
Cor Strategies (R) (Note: Poll sponsored by Heritage Action)	October 10–15, 2026	1,409 (LV)	± 2.6%	40%	44%	—	—	16%
InsiderAdvantage	October 13–14, 2026	1,200 (LV)	± 2.8%	49%	48%	2%	—	1%
University of Houston	October 10–14, 2026	2,000 (LV)	± 2.2%	46%	48%	3%	—	3%
ActiVote	September 30 – October 14, 2026	400 (LV)	± 4.9%	48%	52%	—	—	—
GS Strategy Group (R)/ New River Strategies (D) (Note: Poll sponsored by The Cook Political Report.)	October 9–13, 2026	934 (LV)	—	44%	49%	3%	—	4%
Quantus Insights	October 9–11, 2026	854 (LV)	± 3.6%	47%	47%	2%	—	4%
Marist University	October 8–11, 2026	— (LV)	± 4.9%	45%	47%	—	4% (Note: "Another party's candidate" with 2%; "No response" with 2%)	4%
Marist University	October 8–11, 2026	1,196 (RV)	± 4.3%	44%	48%	—	4%	4%
Trafalgar Group (R)	October 6–8, 2026	1,086 (LV)	± 2.9%	44%	47%	2%	—	8%
ReconMR/Siena University	October 5–8, 2026	617 (LV)	± 4.4%	44%	48%	—	3%	5%
YouGov	September 28 – October 5, 2026	3,625 (LV)	± 3.0%	44%	50%	—	2%	3%
University of Texas/Texas Politics Project	September 25 – October 5, 2026	861 (LV)	± 3.3%	47%	50%	1%	2%	—
New York Times/Siena University	September 21–30, 2026	615 (LV)	± 4.5%	45%	51%	—	0%	4%
Rasmussen Reports	September 28–29, 2026	1,128 (LV)	± 3.0%	45%	46%	4%	—	5%
Beacon Research (D)/ Shaw & Co. Research (R)	September 24–28, 2026	881 (LV)	± 3.0%	49%	51%	—	—	1%
Beacon Research (D)/ Shaw & Co. Research (R)	September 24–28, 2026	1,203 (RV)	± 2.5%	46%	53%	—	—	1%
Guidant Polling & Strategy (R) (Note: Poll sponsored by Public First Action)	September 20–28, 2026	800 (LV)	± 3.5%	44%	47%	4%	—	5%
UMass Lowell/YouGov	September 18–28, 2026	850 (LV)	± 4.5%	45%	45%	2%	2% (Note: "Another candidate" with 1%; "Will not vote" with 1%)	7%
Pulse Decision Science (R)	September 24–27, 2026	800 (LV)	± 3.5%	48%	45%	—	—	4%
Big Data Poll (Note: Poll sponsored by the Public Polling Project)	September 24–26, 2026	698 (LV)	± 4.0%	45%	47%	8%	—	—
Big Data Poll	September 24–26, 2026	698 (LV)	± 4.0%	42%	45%	5%	—	9%
Big Data Poll	September 24–26, 2026	793 (RV)	± 4.0%	44%	46%	10%	—	—
Big Data Poll	September 24–26, 2026	793 (RV)	± 4.0%	39%	44%	5%	—	12%
Stratus Intelligence (R) (Note: Poll sponsored by Texans for a Conservative Majority)	September 22–24, 2026	856 (LV)	± 3.5%	48%	48%	—	—	4%
Texas Public Opinion Research (D)	September 19–22, 2026	1,007 (LV)	± 3.6%	44%	49%	3%	1% (Note: "Would not vote in this race" with 1%)	3%
Marist University	September 17–20, 2026	1,139 (RV)	± 4.4%	44%	50%	—	2%	4%
Texas Southern University	September 15–19, 2026	1,800 (LV)	± 2.3%	46%	47%	3%	—	4%
Trafalgar Group (R)	September 15–17, 2026	1,079 (LV)	± 2.9%	45%	46%	3%	—	6%
Emerson College	September 12–14, 2026	1,000 (LV)	± 3.0%	46%	47%	2%	—	4%
SoCal Strategies	September 12–13, 2026	649 (LV)	—	45%	50%	—	—	5%
ReconMR/Siena University	September 8–11, 2026	614 (LV)	± 4.3%	43%	49%	—	4% (Note: "Other/No Vote" with 4%)	4%
Mason-Dixon (Note: Poll sponsored by Telemundo Texas)	September 8–10, 2026	625 (LV)	± 4.0%	43%	46%	3%	—	8%
InsiderAdvantage	September 8–9, 2026	1,200 (LV)	± 2.8%	46%	47%	2%	—	5%
Univision/YouGov	August 27 – September 4, 2026	1,000 (RV)	± 3.6%	43%	48%	—	1%	7%
Fabrizio Ward (R)/ Impact Research (D) (Note: Poll commissioned by AARP)	August 30 – September 1, 2026	895 (LV)	± 3.3%	44%	48%	—	—	8%
Overton Insights (R) (Note: Poll sponsored by the Texas Public Policy Foundation, a conservative think tank)	August 24–26, 2026	1,167 (LV)	± 2.9%	50%	50%	—	—	—
Overton Insights (R)	August 24–26, 2026	1,167 (LV)	± 2.9%	43%	44%	—	—	13%
Texas Public Opinion Research (D)	August 21–24, 2026	1,000 (LV)	± 3.3%	42%	48%	1%	1% (Note: "Would not vote" with 1%)	7%
University of Texas/Texas Politics Project	August 5–13, 2026	1,200 (RV)	± 2.8%	39%	42%	3%	1% (Note: "Someone else" with 1%)	14%
Emerson College	August 9–10, 2026	1000 (LV)	± 3.0%	47%	46%	—	2%	5%
YouGov Blue (D)	July 15–31, 2026	1,001 (RV) (Note: "weighted to likely voter targets provided by 254 Labs")	± 3.6%	45%	48%	—	—	6%
Texas A&M University/ReconMR/Siena University	July 27–30, 2026	619 (LV)	± 4.7%	43%	47%	—	4%	6%
Texas Southern University	July 27–30, 2026	1,200 (LV)	± 2.8%	45%	47%	2%	—	6%
Beacon Research (D)/ Shaw & Co. Research (R)	July 23–27, 2026	1,005 (RV)	± 3.0%	48%	51%	—	—	3%
Texas Public Opinion Research (D)	July 15–17, 2026	1,048 (LV)	± 3.4%	40%	45%	1%	—	14%
A2 Insights	June 23–28, 2026	618 (LV)	± 5.3%	46%	48%	—	3% (Note: "Other candidate" with 3%)	3%
New York Times/Siena University	June 19–27, 2026	656 (LV)	± 4.5%	47%	47%	—	<1%	6%
SoCal Strategies (R) (Note: Poll sponsored by Red Eagle Politics, which supports Paxton)	June 21, 2026	800 (LV)	—	49%	47%	—	—	4%
University of Texas/Texas Politics Project	June 5–12, 2026	1,200 (RV)	± 2.8% (Note: ±3.4% adjusted for weighting)	43%	42%	3%	3% (Note: "Someone else" with 3%)	10%
Quantus Insights	June 3–4, 2026	800 (LV)	± 3.5%	45%	43%	—	4% (Note: "Another candidate" with 4%)	7%
Texas A&M University/ReconMR/Siena University	June 1–4, 2026	807 (LV)	± 4.0%	46%	46%	—	4% (Note: "Someone else" with 3%; "Wouldn't vote" with 1%)	5%
Texas Public Opinion Research (D)	May 27–28, 2026	1,670 (LV)	± 2.8%	44%	47%	1%	3% (Note: "Would not vote in that race" with 2%)	7%
	May 26, 2026	Republican primary runoff						
Public Policy Polling (D) (Note: Poll sponsored by Lone Star Rising PAC, which supports Talarico)	May 22–23, 2026	643 (RV)	—	38%	45%	3%	—	14%
Texas Southern University	April 22 – May 6, 2026	1,223 (LV)	± 2.8%	45%	45%	2%	—	8%
Texas Public Opinion Research (D)	April 17–20, 2026	1,018 (LV)	± 3.3%	41%	46%	—	—	9%
University of Texas/Texas Politics Project	April 10–20, 2026	1,200 (RV)	± 2.8%	34%	42%	—	5%	19% (Note: "Haven't thought about it enough to have an opinion")
Impact Research (D)	March 12–17, 2026	900 (LV)	± 3.3%	43%	44%	5%	—	7%
Public Policy Polling (D)	March 4–5, 2026	576 (V)	± 4.1%	45%	47%	—	—	8%
	March 3, 2026	Primary elections						
University of Houston/YouGov	January 20–31, 2026	1,502 (LV)	± 2.5%	46%	44%	3%	—	7%
Emerson College	January 10–12, 2026	1,165 (RV)	± 2.8%	46%	46%	—	—	9%
Ragnar Research Partners (R)	November 12–17, 2025	1,000 (LV)	± 3.0%	44%	44%	—	—	12%
University of Houston/ Texas Southern University	September 19 – October 1, 2025	1,650 (RV)	± 2.4%	49%	46%	—	—	5%
UT Tyler	September 17–24, 2025	1,032 (RV)	± 3.1%	38%	37%	—	8% (Note: "Someone else" with 8%)	17%

Hypothetical polling

John Cornyn vs. James Talarico

Poll source	Date(s) administered	Sample size	Margin of error	John Cornyn (R)	James Talarico (D)	Other	Undecided
Overton Insights (R)	August 24–26, 2026	1,167 (LV)	± 2.9%	43%	44%	—	14%
	May 26, 2026	Republican primary runoff					
Texas Southern University	April 22 – May 6, 2026	1,223 (LV)	± 2.8%	45%	44%	3% (Note: Ted Brown (L) with 3%)	8%
Texas Public Opinion Research (D)	April 17–20, 2026	1,018 (LV)	± 3.3%	41%	44%	—	11%
University of Texas/Texas Politics Project	April 10–20, 2026	1,200 (RV)	± 2.8%	33%	40%	7% (Note: "Someone else" with 7%)	19%
Impact Research (D)	March 12–17, 2026	900 (LV)	± 3.3%	41%	43%	7% (Note: Ted Brown (L) with 7%)	10%
Public Policy Polling (D)	March 4–5, 2026	576 (V)	± 4.1%	43%	44%	—	13%
	March 3, 2026	Primary elections					
University of Houston/YouGov	January 20–31, 2026	1,502 (LV)	± 2.5%	44%	43%	5% (Note: Ted Brown (L) with 5%)	8%
Emerson College	January 10–12, 2026	1,165 (RV)	± 2.8%	47%	44%	—	9%
Ragnar Research Partners (R)	November 12–17, 2025	1,000 (LV)	± 3.0%	46%	40%	—	14%
University of Houston/ Texas Southern University	September 19 – October 1, 2025	1,650 (RV)	± 2.4%	48%	45%	—	7%
UT Tyler	September 17–24, 2025	1,032 (RV)	± 3.1%	41%	35%	7%	17%

John Cornyn vs. Jasmine Crockett

Poll source	Date(s) administered	Sample size	Margin of error	John Cornyn (R)	Jasmine Crockett (D)	Other	Undecided
University of Houston/YouGov	January 20–31, 2026	1,502 (LV)	± 2.5%	45%	43%	5%	7%
Emerson College	January 10–12, 2026	1,165 (RV)	± 2.8%	48%	43%	—	9%
Change Research (D)	November 21–26, 2025	1,189 (V)	± 3.1%	49%	41%	—	10%
University of Houston/ Texas Southern University	September 19 – October 1, 2025	1,650 (RV)	± 2.4%	50%	44%	—	6%

Ken Paxton vs. Jasmine Crockett

Poll source	Date(s) administered	Sample size	Margin of error	Ken Paxton (R)	Jasmine Crockett (D)	Other	Undecided
Overton Insights (R)	August 24–26, 2026	1,167 (LV)	± 2.9%	49%	43%	8%	—
	May 26, 2026	Republican primary runoff					
	March 3, 2026	Primary elections					
Hart Research (D) (Note: Poll sponsored by Forward Texas super PAC, which supports Crockett)	February 6–12, 2026	803 (LV)	± 3.5%	45%	49%	—	6%
University of Houston/YouGov	January 20–31, 2026	1,502 (LV)	± 2.5%	45%	43%	4% (Note: Ted Brown (L) with 4%)	8%
Emerson College	January 10–12, 2026	1,165 (RV)	± 2.8%	46%	46%	—	9%
Change Research (D)	November 21–26, 2025	1,189 (V)	± 3.1%	50%	42%	—	8%
University of Houston/ Texas Southern University	September 19 – October 1, 2025	1,650 (RV)	± 2.4%	49%	47%	—	2%

John Cornyn vs. Colin Allred

Poll source	Date(s) administered	Sample size	Margin of error	John Cornyn (R)	Colin Allred (D)	Other	Undecided
Ragnar Research Partners (R)	November 12–17, 2025	1,000 (LV)	± 3.0%	47%	40%	—	13%
University of Houston/ Texas Southern University	September 19 – October 1, 2025	1,650 (RV)	± 2.4%	48%	46%	—	6%
UT Tyler	September 17–24, 2025	1,032 (RV)	± 3.1%	43%	37%	7%	13%
Emerson College	August 11–12, 2025	1,000 (RV)	± 3.0%	45%	38%	—	17%
YouGov/Texas Southern University	May 9–19, 2025	1,200 (RV)	± 2.8%	48%	44%	—	8%

Ken Paxton vs. Colin Allred

Poll source	Date(s) administered	Sample size	Margin of error	Ken Paxton (R)	Colin Allred (D)	Other	Undecided
Ragnar Research Partners (R)	November 12–17, 2025	1,000 (LV)	± 3.0%	43%	44%	—	12%
University of Houston/ Texas Southern University	September 19 – October 1, 2025	1,650 (RV)	± 2.4%	48%	47%	—	5%
UT Tyler	September 17–24, 2025	1,032 (RV)	± 3.1%	38%	41%	8%	13%
GBAO (D) (Note: Poll sponsored by Allred's campaign)	August 13–18, 2025	800 (LV)	± 3.5%	47%	49%	—	4%
GBAO (D)	August 13–18, 2025	800 (LV)	± 3.5%	49%	50%	—	—
Emerson College	August 11–12, 2025	1,000 (RV)	± 3.0%	46%	41%	—	13%
YouGov/Texas Southern University	May 9–19, 2025	1,200 (RV)	± 2.8%	48%	46%	—	6%
Brad Parscale (R)	Mid–April 2025	>1,000 (LV)	—	37%	52%	—	11%

Wesley Hunt vs. Colin Allred

Poll source	Date(s) administered	Sample size	Margin of error	Wesley Hunt (R)	Colin Allred (D)	Other	Undecided
University of Houston/ Texas Southern University	September 19 – October 1, 2025	1,650 (RV)	± 2.4%	50%	45%	—	5%
UT Tyler	September 17–24, 2025	1,032 (RV)	± 3.1%	38%	37%	6% (Note: "Someone else" with 6%)	19%
YouGov/Texas Southern University	May 9–19, 2025	1,200 (RV)	± 2.8%	47%	44%	—	9%

Wesley Hunt vs. Jasmine Crockett

Poll source	Date(s) administered	Sample size	Margin of error	Wesley Hunt (R)	Jasmine Crockett (D)	Other	Undecided
University of Houston/YouGov	January 20–31, 2026	1,502 (LV)	± 2.5%	46%	43%	3%	8%
Emerson College	January 10–12, 2026	1,165 (RV)	± 2.8%	48%	43%	—	9%
University of Houston/ Texas Southern University	September 19 – October 1, 2025	1,650 (RV)	± 2.4%	50%	45%	—	5%

Wesley Hunt vs. James Talarico

Poll source	Date(s) administered	Sample size	Margin of error	Wesley Hunt (R)	James Talarico (D)	Other	Undecided
University of Houston/YouGov	January 20–31, 2026	1,502 (LV)	± 2.5%	46%	42%	3%	9%
Emerson College	January 10–12, 2026	1,165 (RV)	± 2.8%	47%	44%	—	9%
University of Houston/ Texas Southern University	September 19 – October 1, 2025	1,650 (RV)	± 2.4%	50%	44%	—	6%
UT Tyler	September 17–24, 2025	1,032 (RV)	± 3.1%	36%	37%	6%	21%

John Cornyn vs. Beto O'Rourke

Poll source	Date(s) administered	Sample size	Margin of error	John Cornyn (R)	Beto O'Rourke (D)	Undecided
University of Houston/ Texas Southern University	September 19 – October 1, 2025	1,650 (RV)	± 2.4%	49%	46%	5%
YouGov/Texas Southern University	May 9–19, 2025	1,200 (RV)	± 2.8%	49%	43%	8%

Ken Paxton vs. Beto O'Rourke

Poll source	Date(s) administered	Sample size	Margin of error	Ken Paxton (R)	Beto O'Rourke (D)	Undecided
University of Houston/ Texas Southern University	September 19 – October 1, 2025	1,650 (RV)	± 2.4%	49%	46%	5%
YouGov/Texas Southern University	May 9–19, 2025	1,200 (RV)	± 2.8%	49%	45%	6%

Wesley Hunt vs. Beto O'Rourke

Poll source	Date(s) administered	Sample size	Margin of error	Wesley Hunt (R)	Beto O'Rourke (D)	Undecided
University of Houston/ Texas Southern University	September 19 – October 1, 2025	1,650 (RV)	± 2.4%	49%	47%	4%
YouGov/Texas Southern University	May 9–19, 2025	1,200 (RV)	± 2.8%	49%	43%	8%

John Cornyn vs. Joaquin Castro

Poll source	Date(s) administered	Sample size	Margin of error	John Cornyn (R)	Joaquin Castro (D)	Undecided
YouGov/Texas Southern University	May 9–19, 2025	1,200 (RV)	± 2.8%	48%	41%	11%

Ken Paxton vs. Joaquin Castro

Poll source	Date(s) administered	Sample size	Margin of error	Ken Paxton (R)	Joaquin Castro (D)	Undecided
YouGov/Texas Southern University	May 9–19, 2025	1,200 (RV)	± 2.8%	47%	44%	9%

Wesley Hunt vs. Joaquin Castro

Poll source	Date(s) administered	Sample size	Margin of error	Wesley Hunt (R)	Joaquin Castro (D)	Undecided
YouGov/Texas Southern University	May 9–19, 2025	1,200 (RV)	± 2.8%	48%	42%	10%

John Cornyn vs. Generic Democrat

Poll source	Date(s) administered	Sample size	Margin of error	John Cornyn (R)	Generic Democrat	Undecided
Stratus Intelligence (R)	June 6–8, 2025	800 (LV)	± 3.5%	42%	35%	23%

Ken Paxton vs. Generic Democrat

Poll source	Date(s) administered	Sample size	Margin of error	Ken Paxton (R)	Generic Democrat	Undecided
Stratus Intelligence (R)	June 6–8, 2025	800 (LV)	± 3.5%	39%	42%	19%

Generic Republican vs. Generic Democrat

Poll source	Date(s) administered	Sample size	Margin of error	Generic Republican	Generic Democrat	Other	Undecided
Texas Public Opinion Research	August 27–29, 2025	843 (RV)	± 4.6%	48%	43%	9% (Note: "Someone else" with 9%)	—

=== Results ===
2026 United States Senate election in Texas
Party	Candidate	Votes	%	±%
Democratic	James Talarico	5,447,080	55.06	+11.18
Republican	Ken Paxton	4,250,704	42.97	−10.54
Libertarian	Ted Brown	190,293	1.92	+0.04
Write-in		5,112	0.05	
Total votes		9,893,189	100.0	
Democratic gain from Republican				

==== By county ====
By county

Legend
Counties won by Talarico
Counties won by Paxton

2026 U.S. Senate election results by Texas county
County	Talarico Democratic		Paxton Republican		Brown Libertarian		Other (Note: Other includes Avery Ayers, Bradford "Brad" Hall, Zul Mohamed, and Jade Simmons.)		Margin		Total votes
County	Votes	%	Votes	%	Votes	%	Votes	%	Votes	%	Total votes
Anderson	3,981	26.04%	10,930	71.48%	346	2.26%	33	0.22%	-6,949	-45.45%	15,290
Andrews	1,105	26.64%	2,913	70.23%	127	3.06%	3	0.07%	-1,808	-43.59%	4,148
Angelina	9,135	33.48%	17,436	63.90%	715	2.62%	0	0.00%	-8,301	-30.42%	27,286
Aransas	2,925	27.60%	7,440	70.20%	231	2.18%	3	0.03%	-4,515	-42.60%	10,599
Archer	566	14.16%	3,331	83.32%	99	2.48%	2	0.05%	-2,765	-69.16%	3,998
Armstrong	88	10.19%	740	85.65%	34	3.94%	2	0.23%	-652	-75.46%	864
Atascosa	6,031	41.41%	8,195	56.27%	303	2.08%	34	0.23%	-2,164	-14.86%	14,563
Austin	3,316	25.86%	9,225	71.95%	278	2.17%	2	0.02%	-5,909	-46.09%	12,821
Bailey	448	31.57%	939	66.17%	29	2.04%	3	0.21%	-491	-34.60%	1,419
Bandera	2,345	22.91%	7,612	74.38%	277	2.71%	0	0.00%	-5,267	-51.47%	10,234
Bastrop	20,074	54.26%	16,049	43.38%	853	2.31%	23	0.06%	4,025	10.88%	36,999
Baylor	186	15.44%	977	81.08%	41	3.40%	1	0.08%	-791	-65.64%	1,205
Bee	3,014	42.10%	3,990	55.73%	149	2.08%	6	0.08%	-976	-13.63%	7,159
Bell	56,562	51.12%	50,887	45.99%	3,046	2.75%	151	0.14%	5,675	5.13%	110,646
Bexar	440,271	66.87%	206,838	31.41%	11,336	1.72%	0	0.00%	233,433	35.45%	658,445
Blanco	2,134	28.21%	5,282	69.81%	141	1.86%	9	0.12%	-3,148	-41.61%	7,566
Borden	21	6.84%	276	89.90%	9	2.93%	1	0.33%	-255	-83.06%	307
Bosque	1,700	21.98%	5,756	74.41%	264	3.41%	15	0.19%	-4,056	-52.44%	7,735
Bowie	9,059	32.67%	17,958	64.76%	679	2.45%	35	0.13%	-8,899	-32.09%	27,731
Brazoria	73,275	51.64%	65,605	46.24%	2,944	2.07%	59	0.04%	7,670	5.41%	141,883
Brazos	41,425	51.78%	36,655	45.82%	1,787	2.23%	133	0.17%	4,770	5.96%	80,000
Brewster	2,063	54.13%	1,633	42.85%	112	2.94%	3	0.08%	430	11.28%	3,811
Briscoe	83	13.95%	498	83.70%	11	1.85%	3	0.50%	-415	-69.75%	595
Brooks	1,255	69.22%	521	28.74%	37	2.04%	0	0.00%	734	40.49%	1,813
Brown	2,349	18.14%	10,220	78.94%	377	2.91%	0	0.00%	-7,871	-60.80%	12,946
Burleson	1,924	24.65%	5,683	72.82%	192	2.46%	5	0.06%	-3,759	-48.17%	7,804
Burnet	7,121	29.34%	16,559	68.22%	566	2.33%	28	0.12%	-9,438	-38.88%	24,274
Caldwell	8,368	56.61%	6,051	40.94%	362	2.45%	0	0.00%	2,317	15.68%	14,781
Calhoun	2,078	32.87%	4,087	64.65%	154	2.44%	3	0.05%	-2,009	-31.78%	6,322
Callahan	868	16.12%	4,328	80.36%	186	3.45%	4	0.07%	-3,460	-64.24%	5,386
Cameron	69,808	68.42%	30,541	29.93%	1,668	1.63%	15	0.01%	39,267	38.48%	102,032
Camp	1,348	31.46%	2,822	65.86%	108	2.52%	7	0.16%	-1,474	-34.40%	4,285
Carson	345	14.48%	1,939	81.40%	95	3.99%	3	0.13%	-1,594	-66.92%	2,382
Cass	2,270	20.95%	8,293	76.53%	273	2.52%	0	0.00%	-6,023	-55.58%	10,836
Castro	448	29.05%	1,068	69.26%	26	1.69%	0	0.00%	-620	-40.21%	1,542
Chambers	5,072	26.05%	14,000	71.92%	381	1.96%	14	0.07%	-8,928	-45.86%	19,467
Cherokee	4,468	26.90%	11,739	70.67%	394	2.37%	10	0.06%	-7,271	-43.77%	16,611
Childress	281	16.68%	1,323	78.52%	81	4.81%	0	0.00%	-1,042	-61.84%	1,685
Clay	674	14.54%	3,820	82.43%	139	3.00%	1	0.02%	-3,146	-67.89%	4,634
Cochran	214	30.84%	464	66.86%	16	2.31%	0	0.00%	-250	-36.02%	694
Coke	203	14.99%	1,113	82.20%	38	2.81%	0	0.00%	-910	-67.21%	1,354
Coleman	450	13.92%	2,684	83.04%	98	3.03%	0	0.00%	-2,234	-69.12%	3,232
Collin	252,403	55.15%	197,096	43.07%	7,914	1.73%	228	0.05%	55,307	12.09%	457,641
Collingsworth	142	14.92%	775	81.41%	33	3.47%	2	0.21%	-633	-66.49%	952
Colorado	2,300	27.53%	5,917	70.81%	136	1.63%	3	0.04%	-3,617	-43.29%	8,356
Comal	30,670	34.41%	56,728	63.64%	1,699	1.91%	46	0.05%	-26,058	-29.23%	89,143
Comanche	1,015	19.71%	3,989	77.46%	142	2.76%	4	0.08%	-2,974	-57.75%	5,150
Concho	190	19.13%	766	77.14%	37	3.73%	0	0.00%	-576	-58.01%	993
Cooke	4,159	24.25%	12,611	73.54%	372	2.17%	6	0.03%	-8,452	-49.29%	17,148
Coryell	7,254	38.47%	10,888	57.74%	704	3.73%	10	0.05%	-3,634	-19.27%	18,856
Cottle	97	18.13%	420	78.50%	18	3.36%	0	0.00%	-323	-60.37%	535
Crane	290	28.60%	697	68.74%	22	2.17%	5	0.49%	-407	-40.14%	1,014
Crockett	335	33.80%	624	62.97%	29	2.93%	3	0.30%	-289	-29.16%	991
Crosby	513	34.43%	924	62.01%	53	3.56%	0	0.00%	-411	-27.58%	1,490
Culberson	513	59.17%	321	37.02%	33	3.81%	0	0.00%	192	22.15%	867
Dallam	241	23.60%	752	73.65%	28	2.74%	0	0.00%	-511	-50.05%	1,021
Dallas	563,219	71.87%	206,355	26.33%	13,734	1.75%	406	0.05%	356,864	45.53%	783,714
Dawson	681	26.46%	1,828	71.02%	63	2.45%	2	0.08%	-1,147	-44.56%	2,574
Deaf Smith	1,459	41.39%	1,989	56.43%	75	2.13%	2	0.06%	-530	-15.04%	3,525
Delta	420	20.99%	1,525	76.21%	56	2.80%	0	0.00%	-1,105	-55.22%	2,001
Denton	211,266	53.32%	177,859	44.89%	6,834	1.72%	276	0.07%	33,407	8.43%	396,235
DeWitt	1,382	22.11%	4,757	76.10%	107	1.71%	5	0.08%	-3,375	-53.99%	6,251
Dickens	142	18.96%	581	77.57%	25	3.34%	1	0.13%	-439	-58.61%	749
Dimmit	1,845	68.64%	793	29.50%	50	1.86%	0	0.00%	1,052	39.14%	2,688
Donley	196	15.49%	1,036	81.90%	33	2.61%	0	0.00%	-840	-66.40%	1,265
Duval	2,189	66.74%	984	30.00%	107	3.26%	0	0.00%	1,205	36.74%	3,280
Eastland	1,057	16.72%	5,065	80.12%	198	3.13%	2	0.03%	-4,008	-63.40%	6,322
Ector	11,608	39.37%	17,190	58.29%	676	2.29%	14	0.05%	-5,582	-18.93%	29,488
Edwards	168	20.87%	619	76.89%	18	2.24%	0	0.00%	-451	-56.02%	805
Ellis	41,351	46.67%	45,286	51.12%	1,887	2.13%	72	0.08%	-3,935	-4.44%	88,596
El Paso	159,272	72.88%	54,576	24.97%	4,642	2.12%	47	0.02%	104,696	47.91%	218,537
Erath	3,609	25.56%	10,084	71.43%	414	2.93%	11	0.08%	-6,475	-45.86%	14,118
Falls	1,692	34.29%	3,098	62.78%	135	2.74%	10	0.20%	-1,406	-28.49%	4,935
Fannin	2,942	22.65%	9,653	74.33%	381	2.93%	11	0.08%	-6,711	-51.67%	12,987
Fayette	2,942	26.30%	7,984	71.37%	257	2.30%	3	0.03%	-5,042	-45.07%	11,186
Fisher	305	21.59%	1,024	72.47%	77	5.45%	7	0.50%	-719	-50.88%	1,413
Floyd	461	28.11%	1,128	68.78%	39	2.38%	12	0.73%	-667	-40.67%	1,640
Foard	90	22.11%	306	75.18%	11	2.70%	0	0.00%	-216	-53.07%	407
Fort Bend	210,760	63.50%	115,973	34.94%	5,017	1.51%	143	0.04%	94,787	28.56%	331,893
Franklin	898	21.15%	3,236	76.23%	106	2.50%	5	0.12%	-2,338	-55.08%	4,245
Freestone	1,715	23.47%	5,410	74.04%	182	2.49%	0	0.00%	-3,695	-50.57%	7,307
Frio	2,060	54.24%	1,631	42.94%	107	2.82%	0	0.00%	429	11.30%	3,798
Gaines	812	16.97%	3,846	80.36%	128	2.67%	0	0.00%	-3,034	-63.39%	4,786
Galveston	62,051	46.10%	69,943	51.96%	2,561	1.90%	43	0.03%	-7,892	-5.86%	134,598
Garza	241	20.74%	893	76.85%	26	2.24%	2	0.17%	-652	-56.11%	1,162
Gillespie	3,717	25.48%	10,582	72.54%	280	1.92%	9	0.06%	-6,865	-47.06%	14,588
Glasscock	54	9.69%	493	88.51%	10	1.80%	0	0.00%	-439	-78.82%	557
Goliad	853	25.46%	2,427	72.43%	70	2.09%	1	0.03%	-1,574	-46.97%	3,351
Gonzales	2,241	33.47%	4,316	64.47%	132	1.97%	6	0.09%	-2,075	-30.99%	6,695
Gray	1,065	19.37%	4,245	77.20%	188	3.42%	1	0.02%	-3,180	-57.83%	5,499
Grayson	16,190	30.09%	36,326	67.50%	1,266	2.35%	32	0.06%	-20,136	-37.42%	53,814
Gregg	14,742	38.73%	22,405	58.87%	894	2.35%	18	0.05%	-7,663	-20.13%	38,059
Grimes	3,123	26.60%	8,260	70.36%	335	2.85%	21	0.18%	-5,137	-43.76%	11,739
Guadalupe	32,666	46.02%	36,786	51.82%	1,472	2.07%	58	0.08%	-4,120	-5.80%	70,982
Hale	2,559	33.93%	4,796	63.60%	181	2.40%	5	0.07%	-2,237	-29.66%	7,541
Hall	150	18.16%	654	79.18%	22	2.66%	0	0.00%	-504	-61.02%	826
Hamilton	692	19.40%	2,775	77.80%	94	2.64%	6	0.17%	-2,083	-58.40%	3,567
Hansford	249	16.50%	1,218	80.72%	42	2.78%	0	0.00%	-969	-64.21%	1,509
Hardeman	183	18.79%	751	77.10%	40	4.11%	0	0.00%	-568	-58.32%	974
Hardin	3,778	18.05%	16,647	79.53%	497	2.37%	11	0.05%	-12,869	-61.48%	20,933
Harris	907,617	65.60%	451,780	32.66%	23,478	1.70%	605	0.04%	455,837	32.95%	1,383,480
Harrison	7,584	31.53%	15,917	66.17%	542	2.25%	13	0.05%	-8,333	-34.64%	24,056
Hartley	226	14.76%	1,269	82.89%	35	2.29%	1	0.07%	-1,043	-68.13%	1,531
Haskell	310	19.10%	1,255	77.33%	58	3.57%	0	0.00%	-945	-58.23%	1,623
Hays	77,844	65.00%	39,480	32.97%	2,369	1.98%	63	0.05%	38,364	32.04%	119,756
Hemphill	258	20.71%	957	76.81%	29	2.33%	2	0.16%	-699	-56.10%	1,246
Henderson	7,976	25.64%	22,301	71.69%	796	2.56%	33	0.11%	-14,325	-46.05%	31,106
Hidalgo	146,763	72.45%	52,660	26.00%	3,097	1.53%	52	0.03%	94,103	46.45%	202,572
Hill	3,359	25.49%	9,429	71.55%	354	2.69%	36	0.27%	-6,070	-46.06%	13,178
Hockley	1,670	25.88%	4,627	71.71%	143	2.22%	12	0.19%	-2,957	-45.83%	6,452
Hood	6,885	22.77%	22,719	75.13%	621	2.05%	14	0.05%	-15,834	-52.36%	30,239
Hopkins	3,447	25.94%	9,496	71.47%	339	2.55%	5	0.04%	-6,049	-45.53%	13,287
Houston	1,937	25.99%	5,341	71.66%	169	2.27%	6	0.08%	-3,404	-45.67%	7,453
Howard	2,015	28.57%	4,858	68.87%	179	2.54%	2	0.03%	-2,843	-40.30%	7,054
Hudspeth	325	40.57%	445	55.56%	31	3.87%	0	0.00%	-120	-14.98%	801
Hunt	11,898	31.73%	24,602	65.60%	1,002	2.67%	0	0.00%	-12,704	-33.88%	37,502
Hutchinson	1,105	18.20%	4,751	78.23%	205	3.38%	12	0.20%	-3,646	-60.04%	6,073
Irion	98	15.24%	526	81.80%	19	2.95%	0	0.00%	-428	-66.56%	643
Jack	485	14.26%	2,818	82.88%	89	2.62%	8	0.24%	-2,333	-68.62%	3,400
Jackson	1,089	21.80%	3,802	76.10%	105	2.10%	0	0.00%	-2,713	-54.30%	4,996
Jasper	2,764	23.05%	8,931	74.47%	286	2.38%	11	0.09%	-6,167	-51.43%	11,992
Jeff Davis	462	45.56%	511	50.39%	38	3.75%	3	0.30%	-49	-4.83%	1,014
Jefferson	40,543	55.69%	30,937	42.50%	1,270	1.74%	51	0.07%	9,606	13.19%	72,801
Jim Hogg	1,004	74.32%	323	23.91%	24	1.78%	0	0.00%	681	50.41%	1,351
Jim Wells	6,026	56.48%	4,388	41.13%	250	2.34%	5	0.05%	1,638	15.35%	10,669
Johnson	24,653	35.25%	43,645	62.40%	1,626	2.32%	22	0.03%	-18,992	-27.15%	69,946
Jones	1,049	20.06%	3,977	76.06%	198	3.79%	5	0.10%	-2,928	-56.00%	5,229
Karnes	1,199	29.74%	2,735	67.83%	95	2.36%	3	0.07%	-1,536	-38.10%	4,032
Kaufman	30,899	49.60%	30,115	48.34%	1,237	1.99%	41	0.07%	784	1.26%	62,292
Kendall	7,189	27.56%	18,437	70.68%	438	1.68%	22	0.08%	-11,248	-43.12%	26,086
Kenedy	65	40.62%	84	52.50%	10	6.25%	1	0.62%	-19	-11.88%	160
Kent	62	16.85%	295	80.16%	11	2.99%	0	0.00%	-233	-63.32%	368
Kerr	7,076	30.21%	15,804	67.46%	546	2.33%	0	0.00%	-8,728	-37.26%	23,426
Kimble	330	16.74%	1,577	80.01%	64	3.25%	0	0.00%	-1,247	-63.27%	1,971
King	9	7.76%	107	92.24%	0	0.00%	0	0.00%	-98	-84.48%	116
Kinney	418	34.01%	771	62.73%	40	3.25%	0	0.00%	-353	-28.72%	1,229
Kleberg	4,591	56.25%	3,372	41.31%	196	2.40%	3	0.04%	1,219	14.94%	8,162
Knox	232	23.02%	734	72.82%	41	4.07%	1	0.10%	-502	-49.80%	1,008
Lamar	4,273	26.02%	11,763	71.64%	383	2.33%	0	0.00%	-7,490	-45.62%	16,419
Lamb	853	26.01%	2,319	70.70%	107	3.26%	1	0.03%	-1,466	-44.70%	3,280
Lampasas	2,432	26.54%	6,447	70.34%	282	3.08%	4	0.04%	-4,015	-43.81%	9,165
La Salle	1,055	56.78%	742	39.94%	61	3.28%	0	0.00%	313	16.85%	1,858
Lavaca	1,398	16.28%	7,025	81.80%	160	1.86%	5	0.06%	-5,627	-65.52%	8,588
Lee	1,916	27.64%	4,854	70.01%	151	2.18%	12	0.17%	-2,938	-42.38%	6,933
Leon	1,148	16.26%	5,709	80.84%	194	2.75%	11	0.16%	-4,561	-64.59%	7,062
Liberty	8,879	34.84%	16,020	62.87%	550	2.16%	34	0.13%	-7,141	-28.02%	25,483
Limestone	2,213	30.55%	4,861	67.09%	171	2.36%	0	0.00%	-2,648	-36.55%	7,245
Lipscomb	133	14.26%	763	81.78%	37	3.97%	0	0.00%	-630	-67.52%	933
Live Oak	776	20.12%	2,990	77.52%	89	2.31%	2	0.05%	-2,214	-57.40%	3,857
Llano	2,783	23.85%	8,595	73.66%	287	2.46%	4	0.03%	-5,812	-49.81%	11,669
Loving	12	17.91%	53	79.10%	2	2.99%	0	0.00%	-41	-61.19%	67
Lubbock	42,444	40.68%	59,695	57.22%	2,189	2.10%	6	0.01%	-17,251	-16.53%	104,334
Lynn	443	20.87%	1,625	76.54%	54	2.54%	1	0.05%	-1,182	-55.68%	2,123
Madison	1,083	25.20%	3,113	72.43%	92	2.14%	10	0.23%	-2,030	-47.23%	4,298
Marion	1,053	27.50%	2,638	68.90%	135	3.53%	3	0.08%	-1,585	-41.39%	3,829
Martin	278	18.81%	1,149	77.74%	51	3.45%	0	0.00%	-871	-58.93%	1,478
Mason	485	22.47%	1,612	74.70%	61	2.83%	0	0.00%	-1,127	-52.22%	2,158
Matagorda	3,709	33.91%	6,919	63.26%	300	2.74%	9	0.08%	-3,210	-29.35%	10,937
Maverick	8,631	68.52%	3,470	27.55%	450	3.57%	45	0.36%	5,161	40.97%	12,596
McCulloch	479	17.98%	2,110	79.20%	75	2.82%	0	0.00%	-1,631	-61.22%	2,664
McLennan	37,032	44.53%	44,107	53.03%	1,917	2.31%	111	0.13%	-7,075	-8.51%	83,167
McMullen	47	12.67%	315	84.91%	9	2.43%	0	0.00%	-268	-72.24%	371
Medina	8,073	38.00%	12,705	59.80%	459	2.16%	10	0.05%	-4,632	-21.80%	21,247
Menard	179	22.83%	570	72.70%	35	4.46%	0	0.00%	-391	-49.87%	784
Midland	13,236	30.05%	29,740	67.53%	1,063	2.41%	2	0.00%	-16,504	-37.47%	44,041
Milam	2,454	28.51%	5,896	68.49%	258	3.00%	0	0.00%	-3,442	-39.99%	8,608
Mills	341	16.01%	1,735	81.46%	52	2.44%	2	0.09%	-1,394	-65.45%	2,130
Mitchell	346	18.59%	1,467	78.83%	48	2.58%	0	0.00%	-1,121	-60.24%	1,861
Montague	1,326	15.35%	7,085	82.03%	226	2.62%	0	0.00%	-5,759	-66.68%	8,637
Montgomery	98,324	38.03%	155,781	60.25%	4,333	1.68%	104	0.04%	-57,457	-22.22%	258,542
Moore	1,363	33.13%	2,623	63.76%	125	3.04%	3	0.07%	-1,260	-30.63%	4,114
Morris	1,265	30.08%	2,839	67.51%	98	2.33%	3	0.07%	-1,574	-37.43%	4,205
Motley	42	8.14%	458	88.76%	16	3.10%	0	0.00%	-416	-80.62%	516
Nacogdoches	9,090	42.25%	11,921	55.40%	477	2.22%	29	0.13%	-2,831	-13.16%	21,517
Navarro	5,505	34.18%	10,191	63.27%	404	2.51%	8	0.05%	-4,686	-29.09%	16,108
Newton	911	21.32%	3,253	76.15%	106	2.48%	2	0.05%	-2,342	-54.82%	4,272
Nolan	1,045	28.06%	2,511	67.43%	160	4.30%	8	0.21%	-1,466	-39.37%	3,724
Nueces	54,280	54.65%	42,868	43.16%	2,142	2.16%	29	0.03%	11,412	11.49%	99,319
Ochiltree	515	22.08%	1,763	75.60%	50	2.14%	4	0.17%	-1,248	-53.52%	2,332
Oldham	97	13.02%	628	84.30%	19	2.55%	1	0.13%	-531	-71.28%	745
Orange	6,298	23.94%	19,431	73.87%	570	2.17%	6	0.02%	-13,133	-49.93%	26,305
Palo Pinto	2,517	24.23%	7,543	72.63%	317	3.05%	9	0.09%	-5,026	-48.39%	10,386
Panola	1,929	22.51%	6,440	75.16%	191	2.23%	8	0.09%	-4,511	-52.65%	8,568
Parker	17,812	23.38%	56,548	74.23%	1,780	2.34%	44	0.06%	-38,736	-50.85%	76,184
Parmer	517	26.16%	1,414	71.56%	44	2.23%	1	0.05%	-897	-45.39%	1,976
Pecos	1,446	43.29%	1,750	52.40%	143	4.28%	1	0.03%	-304	-9.10%	3,340
Polk	4,532	25.89%	12,558	71.73%	403	2.30%	14	0.08%	-8,026	-45.84%	17,507
Potter	10,066	39.18%	14,960	58.23%	647	2.52%	18	0.07%	-4,894	-19.05%	25,691
Presidio	1,438	74.47%	408	21.13%	32	1.66%	53	2.74%	1,030	53.34%	1,931
Rains	910	17.91%	4,037	79.47%	133	2.62%	0	0.00%	-3,127	-61.56%	5,080
Randall	15,098	28.37%	36,962	69.44%	1,135	2.13%	31	0.06%	-21,864	-41.08%	53,226
Reagan	199	28.27%	468	66.48%	34	4.83%	3	0.43%	-269	-38.21%	704
Real	306	20.32%	1,156	76.76%	43	2.86%	1	0.07%	-850	-56.44%	1,506
Red River	1,057	24.86%	3,109	73.14%	84	1.98%	1	0.02%	-2,052	-48.27%	4,251
Reeves	1,609	51.92%	1,370	44.21%	120	3.87%	0	0.00%	239	7.71%	3,099
Refugio	879	36.55%	1,469	61.08%	56	2.33%	1	0.04%	-590	-24.53%	2,405
Roberts	30	6.61%	414	91.19%	9	1.98%	1	0.22%	-384	-84.58%	454
Robertson	2,248	32.19%	4,516	64.66%	209	2.99%	11	0.16%	-2,268	-32.47%	6,984
Rockwall	20,283	37.91%	32,300	60.37%	922	1.72%	1	0.00%	-12,017	-22.46%	53,506
Runnels	532	16.79%	2,528	79.77%	109	3.44%	0	0.00%	-1,996	-62.99%	3,169
Rusk	4,968	28.60%	11,957	68.83%	421	2.42%	25	0.14%	-6,989	-40.23%	17,371
Sabine	606	14.22%	3,554	83.39%	102	2.39%	0	0.00%	-2,948	-69.17%	4,262
San Augustine	873	28.35%	2,111	68.56%	93	3.02%	2	0.06%	-1,238	-40.21%	3,079
San Jacinto	2,477	23.80%	7,666	73.66%	264	2.54%	0	0.00%	-5,189	-49.86%	10,407
San Patricio	8,533	42.42%	11,095	55.16%	479	2.38%	9	0.04%	-2,562	-12.74%	20,116
San Saba	367	16.79%	1,773	81.11%	46	2.10%	0	0.00%	-1,406	-64.32%	2,186
Schleicher	239	26.12%	650	71.04%	26	2.84%	0	0.00%	-411	-44.92%	915
Scurry	804	19.28%	3,240	77.70%	124	2.97%	2	0.05%	-2,436	-58.42%	4,170
Shackelford	144	11.16%	1,090	84.50%	45	3.49%	11	0.85%	-946	-73.33%	1,290
Shelby	1,904	25.42%	5,457	72.87%	128	1.71%	0	0.00%	-3,553	-47.44%	7,489
Sherman	117	16.60%	557	79.01%	30	4.26%	1	0.14%	-440	-62.41%	705
Smith	32,615	36.63%	54,516	61.22%	1,829	2.05%	91	0.10%	-21,901	-24.59%	89,051
Somervell	865	20.08%	3,333	77.39%	104	2.41%	5	0.12%	-2,468	-57.30%	4,307
Starr	10,072	76.99%	2,772	21.19%	238	1.82%	0	0.00%	7,300	55.80%	13,082
Stephens	453	16.26%	2,231	80.08%	100	3.59%	2	0.07%	-1,778	-63.82%	2,786
Sterling	64	14.25%	369	82.18%	16	3.56%	0	0.00%	-305	-67.93%	449
Stonewall	94	18.43%	406	79.61%	10	1.96%	0	0.00%	-312	-61.18%	510
Sutton	268	24.54%	788	72.16%	36	3.30%	0	0.00%	-520	-47.62%	1,092
Swisher	449	26.20%	1,212	70.71%	53	3.09%	0	0.00%	-763	-44.52%	1,714
Tarrant	427,879	58.72%	287,783	39.50%	12,597	1.73%	371	0.05%	140,096	19.23%	728,630
Taylor	14,125	33.08%	27,400	64.17%	1,148	2.69%	29	0.07%	-13,275	-31.09%	42,702
Terrell	96	28.32%	228	67.26%	15	4.42%	0	0.00%	-132	-38.94%	339
Terry	710	27.13%	1,844	70.46%	62	2.37%	1	0.04%	-1,134	-43.33%	2,617
Throckmorton	78	12.62%	510	82.52%	30	4.85%	0	0.00%	-432	-69.90%	618
Titus	3,194	36.50%	5,358	61.23%	183	2.09%	16	0.18%	-2,164	-24.73%	8,751
Tom Green	12,720	35.14%	22,446	62.01%	1,003	2.77%	28	0.08%	-9,726	-26.87%	36,197
Travis	430,707	78.48%	109,791	20.01%	8,023	1.46%	261	0.05%	320,916	58.48%	548,782
Trinity	1,271	22.09%	4,336	75.36%	147	2.55%	0	0.00%	-3,065	-53.27%	5,754
Tyler	1,262	17.49%	5,724	79.32%	224	3.10%	6	0.08%	-4,462	-61.83%	7,216
Upshur	3,214	20.73%	11,893	76.71%	385	2.48%	11	0.07%	-8,679	-55.98%	15,503
Upton	184	21.42%	651	75.79%	24	2.79%	0	0.00%	-467	-54.37%	859
Uvalde	3,949	47.24%	4,148	49.62%	251	3.00%	12	0.14%	-199	-2.38%	8,360
Val Verde	6,360	54.62%	4,940	42.42%	341	2.93%	4	0.03%	1,420	12.19%	11,645
Van Zandt	4,051	18.27%	17,551	79.15%	551	2.48%	22	0.10%	-13,500	-60.88%	22,175
Victoria	10,599	37.63%	17,103	60.72%	465	1.65%	0	0.00%	-6,504	-23.09%	28,167
Walker	8,515	39.36%	12,644	58.44%	469	2.17%	8	0.04%	-4,129	-19.08%	21,636
Waller	11,431	48.11%	11,868	49.95%	452	1.90%	8	0.03%	-437	-1.84%	23,759
Ward	689	26.97%	1,763	69.00%	102	3.99%	1	0.04%	-1,074	-42.04%	2,555
Washington	4,366	28.19%	10,780	69.61%	334	2.16%	7	0.05%	-6,414	-41.42%	15,487
Webb	42,273	72.44%	14,649	25.10%	1,427	2.45%	7	0.01%	27,624	47.34%	58,356
Wharton	4,006	31.81%	8,375	66.51%	206	1.64%	5	0.04%	-4,369	-34.70%	12,592
Wheeler	204	12.05%	1,427	84.29%	59	3.48%	3	0.18%	-1,223	-72.24%	1,693
Wichita	12,557	36.55%	20,855	60.70%	915	2.66%	32	0.09%	-8,298	-24.15%	34,359
Wilbarger	882	26.02%	2,385	70.35%	118	3.48%	5	0.15%	-1,503	-44.34%	3,390
Willacy	3,092	66.57%	1,465	31.54%	88	1.89%	0	0.00%	1,627	35.03%	4,645
Williamson	164,626	59.08%	108,074	38.78%	5,782	2.07%	186	0.07%	56,552	20.29%	278,668
Wilson	6,847	31.13%	14,666	66.67%	475	2.16%	9	0.04%	-7,819	-35.55%	21,997
Winkler	394	29.42%	919	68.63%	26	1.94%	0	0.00%	-525	-39.21%	1,339
Wise	7,042	22.71%	23,232	74.93%	698	2.25%	34	0.11%	-16,190	-52.22%	31,006
Wood	3,793	19.19%	15,455	78.18%	506	2.56%	15	0.08%	-11,662	-58.99%	19,769
Yoakum	524	29.47%	1,194	67.15%	56	3.15%	4	0.22%	-670	-37.68%	1,778
Young	1,208	18.36%	5,135	78.06%	217	3.30%	18	0.27%	-3,927	-59.70%	6,578
Zapata	2,250	69.12%	925	28.42%	78	2.40%	2	0.06%	1,325	40.71%	3,255
Zavala	2,289	74.37%	733	23.81%	56	1.82%	0	0.00%	1,556	50.55%	3,078
Total	5,444,982	55.06%	4,249,373	42.97%	190,237	1.92%	5,112	0.05%	1,195,609	12.09%	9,889,704
	Talarico Democratic		Paxton Republican		Brown Libertarian		Other		Margin		Total votes

Counties that flipped from Republican to Democratic

- Bastrop (largest municipality: Elgin)
- Bell (largest municipality: Killeen)
- Brazoria (largest municipality: Pearland)
- Brazos (largest municipality: College Station)
- Brewster (largest municipality: Alpine)
- Caldwell (largest municipality: Lockhart)
- Collin (largest municipality: Plano)
- Denton (largest municipality: Denton)
- Frio (largest municipality: Pearsall)
- Jefferson (largest municipality: Beaumont)
- Jim Wells (largest municipality: Alice)
- Kaufman (largest municipality: Forney)
- Kleberg (largest municipality: Kingsville)
- La Salle (largest municipality: Cotulla)
- Nueces (largest municipality: Corpus Christi)
- Reeves (largest municipality: Pecos)
- Tarrant (largest municipality: Fort Worth)
- Val Verde (largest municipality: Del Rio)
- Williamson (largest municipality: Round Rock)

=== By congressional district ===
Talarico won 25 out of 38 congressional districts, including eleven that elected Republicans.

District	Paxton	Talarico	Representative
1st	63%	33%	Nathaniel Moran
2nd	47%	50%	Steve Toth
3rd	48%	49%	Keith Self
4th	51%	47%	Pat Fallon
5th	45%	49%	Lance Gooden
6th	47%	50%	Jake Ellzey
7th	25%	73%	Lizzie Fletcher
8th	49%	48%	Jessica Steinmann
9th	39%	58%	Leticia Gutierrez
10th	49%	48%	Chris Gober
11th	53%	43%	August Pfluger
12th	48%	50%	Craig Goldman
13th	60%	37%	Ronny Jackson
14th	49%	48%	Randy Weber
15th	37%	60%	Bobby Pulido
16th	24%	72%	Veronica Escobar
17th	48%	49%	Pete Sessions
18th	12%	85%	Christian Menefee
19th	63%	33%	Tom Sell
20th	21%	76%	Joaquin Castro
21st	50%	47%	Mark Teixeira
22nd	46%	51%	Trever Nehls
23rd	41%	55%	Katy Padilla Stout
24th	47%	50%	Beth Van Duyne
25th	49%	48%	Roger Williams
26th	50%	47%	Brandon Gill
27th	46%	51%	Michael Cloud
28th	29%	68%	Henry Cuellar
29th	18%	79%	Sylvia Garcia
30th	15%	82%	Frederick Haynes III
31st	48.8%	48.5%	John Carter
32nd	46%	50%	Jace Yarbrough
33rd	19%	79%	Colin Allred
34th	36%	61%	Vicente Gonzalez
35th	40%	57%	Johnny Garcia
36th	49%	48%	Brian Babin
37th	12%	86%	Greg Casar
38th	47%	50%	Jon Bonck

== Analysis ==
Talarico's 12.1 percent margin of victory exceeded his polling average by nine percent. Voter turnout substantially exceeded previous Texas midterm elections, beating the previous turnout record from 2018 by 18 percent and the 2022 midterms by 22 percent, but detailed analysis of exit polling indicated that Talarico's performance could not be explained simply by increased turnout; comparing results with the 2024 presidential election, about one in nine Texans who voted for Trump that year voted for Talarico. Talarico's 5.4 million votes is the most received by a Democrat in any statewide race in the state's history.

Latino voters in the state swung sharply back into the Democratic column this election, with exit polling estimating 66% of them supported Talarico after splitting almost evenly between the two parties in 2024.

=== Exit poll ===
2026 United States Senate election in Texas (CNN)
Demographic subgroup	Talarico	Paxton	% of total vote
Ideology
Liberals	97	2	22
Moderates	72	26	40
Conservatives	13	84	38
Party
Democrats	99	1	33
Republicans	11	87	38
Independents	64	33	29
Donald Trump job approval
Approve	5	93	40
Disapprove	89	9	59
2024 presidential vote
Kamala Harris	98	1	42
Donald Trump	11	86	47
Another candidate	74	16	2
Did not vote	81	16	8
Gender
Men	51	47	45
Women	58	40	54
Income
$100,000 or more	54	45	40
$50,000-$99,999	55	43	30
Less than $50,000	58	40	30
Race/ethnicity
White	42	56	55
Asian	71	28	4
Latino	68	30	24
Black	90	8	12
White born-again or evangelical Christian?
Yes	17	80	20
No	65	33	80
Race by gender
White men	39	59	26
White women	44	54	29
Black men	87	10	5
Black women	92	6	7
Latino men	63	36	11
Latina women	73	25	13
All other voters	57	40	9
Age
18–29 years old	79	19	13
30–44 years old	66	32	22
45-64 years old	49	49	35
65 and older	44	55	30
Area type
Urban	73	26	23
Suburban	59	40	48
Rural	36	61	30
Education
College graduate	60	38	45
No college degree	51	47	55
Education by race
White college graduates	51	47	28
Non-white college graduates	74	24	18
Whites without college	32	66	28
Non-whites without college	70	28	27
Education by gender and race
White women with college degrees	54	44	14
White women without college degrees	34	64	15
White men with college degrees	49	50	13
White men without college degrees	29	69	13
Voters of color	72	26	45
Educational attainment
Advanced degree	64	34	18
Bachelor's degree	57	41	27
Associate's degree	54	44	12
Some college	48	50	21
Never attended college	51	46	22

== Notes ==
Partisan clients
