= Texas's 22nd House of Representatives district =

American legislative district

Texas's 22nd State House of Representatives district
Representative
Christian Manuel; D–Beaumont
- Demographics: 26.1% White; 41.9% Black; 23.8% Hispanic; 4.0% Asian
- Population (2020) • Voting age: 186,322; 141,013

The 22nd district of the Texas House of Representatives contains part of Jefferson county. The current representative is Christian Manuel, who was elected in 2023.
