= American Ambulance Association =

- Abbreviation: AAA
- Founded: 1979; 47 years ago
- Legal status: 501(c)(6) trade association
- Purpose: To promote healthcare policies that ensure excellence in the ambulance services industry.
- Headquarters: Rosslyn, Virginia, U.S.
- Coordinates: 38.895269°N 77.071165°W
- President: Aarron Reinert
- Website: www.ambulance.org

The American Ambulance Association (AAA) is a trade association for the EMS industry. The AAA is based in Rosslyn, Virginia, and was founded in 1979.

The AAA's website states that its mission is "to promote health care policies that ensure excellence in the ambulance services industry and provide research, education and communications programs to enable its members to effectively address the needs of the communities they serve". As part of this mission, the AAA manages the "Stars of Life" program, an annual awards program that recognizes "ambulance professionals who have gone above and beyond the call of duty in service to their communities or the EMS profession".

In 2015, the AAA issued its first recommendations for diversity and intercultural communication, noting that the primarily white, male, English-speaking EMS workforce underserved some population sectors.

The AAA holds an annual conference and awards dinner, where it gives annual awards such as the Patient and Employee Safety award to ambulance companies. Another award is the Star of Life award. In March 2017, an ambulance was hit by a Jeep Cherokee in Mississippi, nearly killing a paramedic. Paramedic Jimmy Miller was awarded the AAA Star of Life award for outstanding service after surviving the wreck, which should have killed him.
