= Christian Manuel =

American politician

Member of the Texas House of Representatives from the 22nd district
- Incumbent
- Assumed office January 10, 2023
- Preceded by: Joe Deshotel

Personal details
- Born: October 19, 1985 (age 40) Nederland, Texas
- Party: Democratic
- Education: Lamar University

Christian Van Manuel, also known as Christian Manuel Hayes, (born October 19, 1985) is an American politician who represents district 22 of the Texas House of Representatives. A member of the Democratic Party, he was sworn in on January 10, 2023.

== Early life ==
Manuel was born in Nederland, Texas and raised in Port Arthur. His mother was an educator and his father worked with the U.S. Coast Guard.

== Political career ==
Prior to holding public office, Manuel was chief of staff to Representative Joe Deshotel, his predecessor. Manuel worked for Deshotel for 18 years.

Manuel was elected in 2022, receiving 56.5% of the vote against Republican opponent Jacorian Randle. He was sworn in on January 10, 2023.

== Personal life ==
Manuel is one of three openly gay black people in the 88th Texas legislature.

Texas House of Representatives
Preceded by Joe Deshotel	Member of the Texas House of Representatives from the 22nd district 2023–present	Incumbent
