= Peter K. Enns =

American political scientist

Peter K. Enns is an American political scientist and professor in the Department of Government and the Brooks School of Public Policy at Cornell University. His research focuses on public opinion, political representation, mass incarceration, and the legal system. He has also worked on statistical methods in public opinion research and election forecasting.

Enns holds a faculty position at Cornell, where he teaches and conducts research on American politics and public policy. He served as Executive Director of the Roper Center for Public Opinion Research from 2015 to 2022 and is the Robert S. Harrison Director of the Cornell Center for Social Sciences. He is co-founder and chief data scientist of the polling and data science company Verasight.

Enns has participated in election forecasting. A forecasting model he co-authored for the 2024 U.S. presidential election was reported by independent media and university publications to have correctly predicted the election outcome in all 50 states several weeks before the election. The same model framework was first deployed in the 2020 U.S. presidential election, correctly forecasting the winning candidate in every state except Georgia.

In 2017, Enns received the Emerging Scholar Award from the Elections, Public Opinion, and Voting Behavior section of the American Political Science Association, an award recognizing early-career contributions to research in the field. His co-authored book, Hijacking the Agenda: Economic Power and Political Influence, received the Gladys M. Kammerer Award from the American Political Science Association in 2022, recognizing the best book published in U.S. national policy.

== Selected publications ==
- Witko, Christopher; Morgan, Jana; Kelly, Nathan J.; and Enns, Peter K. (2021). Hijacking the Agenda: Economic Power and Political Influence. Russell Sage Foundation.
- Enns, Peter K. (2016). Incarceration Nation: How the United States Became the Most Punitive Democracy in the World. Cambridge University Press. ISBN 978-1-107-13288-7
- Enns, Peter K., and Wlezien, Christopher (eds.) (2011).Who Gets Represented?. Russell Sage Foundation. 2011. doi:10.7758/9781610447225. ISBN 978-0-87154-242-7
