= Texas's 18th congressional district =

U.S. House district for Texas

Coordinates: 29°49′07″N 95°15′13″W

- Interactive map of district boundaries
- Representative: Christian Menefee; D–Houston
- Distribution: 99.94% urban; 0.06% rural
- Population (2025): 822,648
- Median household income: $67,817
- Ethnicity: 43.4% Hispanic; 32.2% Black; 16.7% White; 4.9% Asian; 2.2% Two or more races; 0.7% other
- Cook PVI: D+21

Texas's 18th congressional district is a congressional district in the U.S. state of Texas. It includes much of inner-city Houston and the surrounding area and has been the Downtown Houston district since 1973. The district is represented by Democrat Christian Menefee, who was sworn in on February 2, 2026, after being elected in a January 2026 special election runoff following the death of Democrat Sylvester Turner.

== History ==
The district was represented during the 1970s by Barbara Jordan, the first black woman elected to Congress from the South, who was praised by many for her powerful presence and oratorical skills. The district was represented by Sheila Jackson Lee from 1995 until her death in 2024, when the seat became vacant. Her daughter, Erica Lee Carter succeeded her for the unexpired term. Former Houston mayor Sylvester Turner then succeeded Carter before his death on March 5, 2025. A special election was held on November 4, 2025, followed by a runoff on January 31, 2026, which was won by Christian Menefee.

Since the district was moved to Houston in 1972, it has voted for a Democrat in every presidential election. The district gave George McGovern 69% in 1972 and Walter Mondale 72% in 1984.

== In popular culture ==
In the TV series The West Wing, Texas's 18th congressional district was represented by fictional Democratic presidential candidate Matt Santos.

== Recent election results from statewide races ==
=== 2023–2027 boundaries ===
Year	Office	Results
2008	President	Obama 73% - 26%
2012	President	Obama 73% - 27%
2014	Senate	Alameel 70% - 30%
2014	Governor	Davis 73% - 27%
2016	President	Clinton 74% - 22%
2018	Senate	O'Rourke 77% - 22%
2018	Governor	Valdez 71% - 27%
2018	Lt. Governor	Collier 75% - 24%
2018	Attorney General	Nelson 75% - 23%
2018	Comptroller of Public Accounts	Chevalier 72% - 25%
2020	President	Biden 74% - 25%
2020	Senate	Hegar 71% - 27%
2022	Governor	O'Rourke 73% - 25%
2022	Lt. Governor	Collier 72% - 25%
2022	Attorney General	Mercedes Garza 72% - 25%
2022	Comptroller of Public Accounts	Dudding 70% - 27%
2024	President	Harris 69% - 29%
2024	Senate	Allred 71% - 26%

=== 2027–2033 boundaries ===
Year	Office	Results
2008	President	Obama 82% - 17%
2012	President	Obama 83% - 17%
2014	Senate	Alameel 80% - 20%
2014	Governor	Davis 82% - 18%
2016	President	Clinton 82% - 15%
2018	Senate	O'Rourke 84% - 15%
2018	Governor	Valdez 78% - 20%
2018	Lt. Governor	Collier 82% - 16%
2018	Attorney General	Nelson 83% - 15%
2018	Comptroller of Public Accounts	Chevalier 80% - 17%
2020	President	Biden 81% - 18%
2020	Senate	Hegar 79% - 19%
2022	Governor	O'Rourke 81% - 18%
2022	Lt. Governor	Collier 79% - 18%
2022	Attorney General	Mercedes Garza 80% - 18%
2022	Comptroller of Public Accounts	Dudding 78% - 19%
2024	President	Harris 77% - 22%
2024	Senate	Allred 78% - 19%
2026	Senate	Talarico 85% - 12%
2026	Governor	Hinojosa 84% - 14%

== Current composition ==
For the 118th and successive Congresses (based on redistricting following the 2020 census), the district contains all or portions of the following counties and communities:

Harris County (4)

Atascocita (part; also 2nd), Houston (part; also 2nd, 7th, 8th, 9th, 22nd, 29th, 36th, 38th; shared with Fort Bend and Montgomery counties), Humble (part; also 2nd and 29th), Jacinto City (part; also 29th and 36th)

== Future composition ==
Beginning with the 2026 election, the 18th district will consist of the following counties:

- Fort Bend (part)
- Harris (part)

== List of members representing the district ==
Representative	Party	Term	Cong ress	Electoral history	Counties represented
District established March 4, 1919
J. Marvin Jones (Amarillo)	Democratic	March 4, 1919 – November 20, 1940	66th 67th 68th 69th 70th 71st 72nd 73rd 74th 75th 76th	Redistricted from the 13th district and re-elected in 1918. Re-elected in 1920. Re-elected in 1922. Re-elected in 1924. Re-elected in 1926. Re-elected in 1928. Re-elected in 1930. Re-elected in 1932. Re-elected in 1934. Re-elected in 1936. Re-elected in 1938. Resigned to become judge of the U.S. Court of Claims.	1919–1923 [data missing]
J. Marvin Jones (Amarillo)	Democratic	March 4, 1919 – November 20, 1940	66th 67th 68th 69th 70th 71st 72nd 73rd 74th 75th 76th	Redistricted from the 13th district and re-elected in 1918. Re-elected in 1920. Re-elected in 1922. Re-elected in 1924. Re-elected in 1926. Re-elected in 1928. Re-elected in 1930. Re-elected in 1932. Re-elected in 1934. Re-elected in 1936. Re-elected in 1938. Resigned to become judge of the U.S. Court of Claims.	1923–1931 [data missing]
J. Marvin Jones (Amarillo)	Democratic	March 4, 1919 – November 20, 1940	66th 67th 68th 69th 70th 71st 72nd 73rd 74th 75th 76th	Redistricted from the 13th district and re-elected in 1918. Re-elected in 1920. Re-elected in 1922. Re-elected in 1924. Re-elected in 1926. Re-elected in 1928. Re-elected in 1930. Re-elected in 1932. Re-elected in 1934. Re-elected in 1936. Re-elected in 1938. Resigned to become judge of the U.S. Court of Claims.	1931–1933 [data missing]
J. Marvin Jones (Amarillo)	Democratic	March 4, 1919 – November 20, 1940	66th 67th 68th 69th 70th 71st 72nd 73rd 74th 75th 76th	Redistricted from the 13th district and re-elected in 1918. Re-elected in 1920. Re-elected in 1922. Re-elected in 1924. Re-elected in 1926. Re-elected in 1928. Re-elected in 1930. Re-elected in 1932. Re-elected in 1934. Re-elected in 1936. Re-elected in 1938. Resigned to become judge of the U.S. Court of Claims.	1933–1943 [data missing]
Vacant		November 20, 1940 – January 3, 1941	76th		1933–1943 [data missing]
Eugene Worley (Shamrock)	Democratic	January 3, 1941 – April 3, 1950	77th 78th 79th 80th 81st	Elected in 1940. Re-elected in 1942. Re-elected in 1944. Re-elected in 1946. Re-elected in 1948. Resigned to become judge of the U.S. Court of Customs and Patent Appeals	1933–1943 [data missing]
Eugene Worley (Shamrock)	Democratic	January 3, 1941 – April 3, 1950	77th 78th 79th 80th 81st	Elected in 1940. Re-elected in 1942. Re-elected in 1944. Re-elected in 1946. Re-elected in 1948. Resigned to become judge of the U.S. Court of Customs and Patent Appeals	1943–1945 [data missing]
Eugene Worley (Shamrock)	Democratic	January 3, 1941 – April 3, 1950	77th 78th 79th 80th 81st	Elected in 1940. Re-elected in 1942. Re-elected in 1944. Re-elected in 1946. Re-elected in 1948. Resigned to become judge of the U.S. Court of Customs and Patent Appeals	1945–1953 [data missing]
Vacant		April 3, 1950 – May 6, 1950	81st		1945–1953 [data missing]
Ben H. Guill (Pampa)	Republican	May 6, 1950 – January 3, 1951	81st	Elected to finish Worley's term. Lost re-election.	1945–1953 [data missing]
Walter E. Rogers (Pampa)	Democratic	January 3, 1951 – January 3, 1967	82nd 83rd 84th 85th 86th 87th 88th 89th	Elected in 1950. Re-elected in 1952. Re-elected in 1954. Re-elected in 1956. Re-elected in 1958. Re-elected in 1960. Re-elected in 1962. Re-elected in 1964. Retired.	1945–1953 [data missing]
Walter E. Rogers (Pampa)	Democratic	January 3, 1951 – January 3, 1967	82nd 83rd 84th 85th 86th 87th 88th 89th	Elected in 1950. Re-elected in 1952. Re-elected in 1954. Re-elected in 1956. Re-elected in 1958. Re-elected in 1960. Re-elected in 1962. Re-elected in 1964. Retired.	1953–1959 [data missing]
Walter E. Rogers (Pampa)	Democratic	January 3, 1951 – January 3, 1967	82nd 83rd 84th 85th 86th 87th 88th 89th	Elected in 1950. Re-elected in 1952. Re-elected in 1954. Re-elected in 1956. Re-elected in 1958. Re-elected in 1960. Re-elected in 1962. Re-elected in 1964. Retired.	1959–1963 [data missing]
Walter E. Rogers (Pampa)	Democratic	January 3, 1951 – January 3, 1967	82nd 83rd 84th 85th 86th 87th 88th 89th	Elected in 1950. Re-elected in 1952. Re-elected in 1954. Re-elected in 1956. Re-elected in 1958. Re-elected in 1960. Re-elected in 1962. Re-elected in 1964. Retired.	1963–1967 [data missing]
Bob Price (Pampa)	Republican	January 3, 1967 – January 3, 1973	90th 91st 92nd	Elected in 1966. Re-elected in 1968. Re-elected in 1970. Redistricted to the 13th district.	1967–1973 [data missing]
Barbara Jordan (Houston)	Democratic	January 3, 1973 – January 3, 1979	93rd 94th 95th	Elected in 1972. Re-elected in 1974. Re-elected in 1976. Retired.	1973–1983 [data missing]
Mickey Leland (Houston)	Democratic	January 3, 1979 – August 7, 1989	96th 97th 98th 99th 100th 101st	Elected in 1978. Re-elected in 1980. Re-elected in 1982. Re-elected in 1984. Re-elected in 1986. Re-elected in 1988. Died.	1973–1983 [data missing]
Mickey Leland (Houston)	Democratic	January 3, 1979 – August 7, 1989	96th 97th 98th 99th 100th 101st	Elected in 1978. Re-elected in 1980. Re-elected in 1982. Re-elected in 1984. Re-elected in 1986. Re-elected in 1988. Died.	1983–1993 [data missing]
Vacant		August 7, 1989 – December 9, 1989	101st		1983–1993 [data missing]
Craig Washington (Houston)	Democratic	December 9, 1989 – January 3, 1995	101st 102nd 103rd	Elected to finish Leland's term. Re-elected in 1990. Re-elected in 1992. Lost renomination.	1983–1993 [data missing]
Craig Washington (Houston)	Democratic	December 9, 1989 – January 3, 1995	101st 102nd 103rd	Elected to finish Leland's term. Re-elected in 1990. Re-elected in 1992. Lost renomination.	1993–1997 [data missing]
Sheila Jackson Lee (Houston)	Democratic	January 3, 1995 – July 19, 2024	104th 105th 106th 107th 108th 109th 110th 111th 112th 113th 114th 115th 116th 117th 118th	Elected in 1994. Re-elected in 1996. Re-elected in 1998. Re-elected in 2000. Re-elected in 2002. Re-elected in 2004. Re-elected in 2006. Re-elected in 2008. Re-elected in 2010. Re-elected in 2012. Re-elected in 2014. Re-elected in 2016. Re-elected in 2018. Re-elected in 2020. Re-elected in 2022. Ran for re-election, but died.	1993–1997 [data missing]
Sheila Jackson Lee (Houston)	Democratic	January 3, 1995 – July 19, 2024	104th 105th 106th 107th 108th 109th 110th 111th 112th 113th 114th 115th 116th 117th 118th	Elected in 1994. Re-elected in 1996. Re-elected in 1998. Re-elected in 2000. Re-elected in 2002. Re-elected in 2004. Re-elected in 2006. Re-elected in 2008. Re-elected in 2010. Re-elected in 2012. Re-elected in 2014. Re-elected in 2016. Re-elected in 2018. Re-elected in 2020. Re-elected in 2022. Ran for re-election, but died.	2003–2005 [data missing]
Sheila Jackson Lee (Houston)	Democratic	January 3, 1995 – July 19, 2024	104th 105th 106th 107th 108th 109th 110th 111th 112th 113th 114th 115th 116th 117th 118th	Elected in 1994. Re-elected in 1996. Re-elected in 1998. Re-elected in 2000. Re-elected in 2002. Re-elected in 2004. Re-elected in 2006. Re-elected in 2008. Re-elected in 2010. Re-elected in 2012. Re-elected in 2014. Re-elected in 2016. Re-elected in 2018. Re-elected in 2020. Re-elected in 2022. Ran for re-election, but died.	2005–2007 [data missing]
Sheila Jackson Lee (Houston)	Democratic	January 3, 1995 – July 19, 2024	104th 105th 106th 107th 108th 109th 110th 111th 112th 113th 114th 115th 116th 117th 118th	Elected in 1994. Re-elected in 1996. Re-elected in 1998. Re-elected in 2000. Re-elected in 2002. Re-elected in 2004. Re-elected in 2006. Re-elected in 2008. Re-elected in 2010. Re-elected in 2012. Re-elected in 2014. Re-elected in 2016. Re-elected in 2018. Re-elected in 2020. Re-elected in 2022. Ran for re-election, but died.	2007–2013 2007–2013
Sheila Jackson Lee (Houston)	Democratic	January 3, 1995 – July 19, 2024	104th 105th 106th 107th 108th 109th 110th 111th 112th 113th 114th 115th 116th 117th 118th	Elected in 1994. Re-elected in 1996. Re-elected in 1998. Re-elected in 2000. Re-elected in 2002. Re-elected in 2004. Re-elected in 2006. Re-elected in 2008. Re-elected in 2010. Re-elected in 2012. Re-elected in 2014. Re-elected in 2016. Re-elected in 2018. Re-elected in 2020. Re-elected in 2022. Ran for re-election, but died.	2013–2023 2013–2023
Sheila Jackson Lee (Houston)	Democratic	January 3, 1995 – July 19, 2024	104th 105th 106th 107th 108th 109th 110th 111th 112th 113th 114th 115th 116th 117th 118th	Elected in 1994. Re-elected in 1996. Re-elected in 1998. Re-elected in 2000. Re-elected in 2002. Re-elected in 2004. Re-elected in 2006. Re-elected in 2008. Re-elected in 2010. Re-elected in 2012. Re-elected in 2014. Re-elected in 2016. Re-elected in 2018. Re-elected in 2020. Re-elected in 2022. Ran for re-election, but died.	2023–2027
Vacant		July 19, 2024 – November 12, 2024	118th		2023–2027
Erica Lee Carter (Houston)	Democratic	November 12, 2024 – January 3, 2025	118th	Elected to finish her mother's term. Did not seek election to a full term.	2023–2027
Sylvester Turner (Houston)	Democratic	January 3, 2025 – March 5, 2025	119th	Elected in 2024. Died.	2023–2027
Vacant		March 5, 2025 – February 2, 2026	119th		2023–2027
Christian Menefee (Houston)	Democratic	February 2, 2026 – present	119th	Elected in runoff to finish Turner’s term. Re-elected in 2026.	2023–2027

== Recent election results ==
2008 United States House of Representatives elections in Texas: District 18
Party	Candidate	Votes	%
Democratic	Sheila Jackson Lee (incumbent)	148,617	77.32
Republican	John Faulk	39,095	20.34
Libertarian	Mike Taylor	4,486	2.33
Majority		109,522	56.98
Turnout		192,295	82.5
Democratic hold			

2010 United States House of Representatives elections in Texas: District 18
Party	Candidate	Votes	%
Democratic	Sheila Jackson Lee (incumbent)	85,108	70.15
Republican	John Faulk	33,067	27.26
Libertarian	Mike Taylor	3,118	2.57
Independent	Charles B. Meyer (Write-in)	28	0.02
Majority		52,041	42.89
Turnout		125,968	36.73
Democratic hold			

2012 United States House of Representatives elections in Texas: District 18
Party	Candidate	Votes	%
Democratic	Sheila Jackson Lee (incumbent)	146,223	75.01
Republican	Sean Seibert	44,015	22.58
Libertarian	Christopher Barber	4,694	2.41
Majority		102,208	52.43
Turnout		194,932	58.79
Democratic hold			

2014 United States House of Representatives elections in Texas: District 18
Party	Candidate	Votes	%
Democratic	Sheila Jackson Lee (incumbent)	76,097	71.78
Republican	Sean Seibert	26,249	24.76
Green	Remington Alessi	1,302	1.23
Independent	Vince Duncan	2,376	2.23
Majority		49,848	47.02
Turnout		106,010	30.60
Democratic hold			

2016 United States House of Representatives elections in Texas: District 18
Party	Candidate	Votes	%
Democratic	Sheila Jackson Lee (incumbent)	150,157	73.50
Republican	Lori Bartley	48,306	23.64
Green	Thomas Kleven	5,845	2.86
Majority		101,851	49.85
Turnout		204,308	55.96
Democratic hold			

2018 United States House of Representatives elections in Texas: District 18
Party	Candidate	Votes	%
Democratic	Sheila Jackson Lee (Incumbent)	138,704	75.3
Republican	Ava Reynero Pate	38,368	20.8
Libertarian	Luke Spencer	4,067	2.2
Independent	Vince Duncan	3,193	1.7
Total votes		184,332	100.0
Democratic hold			

2020 United States House of Representatives elections in Texas: District 18
Party	Candidate	Votes	%
Democratic	Sheila Jackson Lee (incumbent)	180,952	73.3
Republican	Wendell Champion	58,033	23.5
Libertarian	Luke Spencer	4,514	1.8
Independent	Vince Duncan	3,396	1.4
Total votes		246,895	100.0
Democratic hold			

2022 United States House of Representatives elections in Texas: District 18
Party	Candidate	Votes	%
Democratic	Sheila Jackson Lee (incumbent)	110,511	70.7
Republican	Carmen Maria Montiel	40,941	26.2
Independent	Vince Duncan	2,766	1.7
Libertarian	Phil Kurtz	2,050	1.3
Total votes		156,268	100.0
Democratic hold			

2024 Texas's 18th congressional district special election
Party	Candidate	Votes	%
Democratic	Erica Lee Carter	146,413	67.94
Republican	Maria Dunn	47,835	22.20
Republican	Kevin Dural	21,257	9.86
Total votes		215,505	100.00
Democratic hold			

2024 Texas's 18th congressional district election
Party	Candidate	Votes	%
Democratic	Sylvester Turner	151,834	69.4
Republican	Lana Centonze	66,810	30.6
Write-in	Vince Duncan	62	0.03
Write-in	Kevin Dural	14	0.01
Total votes		218,720	100.00
Democratic hold			

2025–26 Texas's 18th congressional district special election
Primary election
Party	Candidate	Votes	%
Democratic	Christian Menefee	22,022	28.90
Democratic	Amanda Edwards	19,467	25.55
Democratic	Jolanda Jones	14,549	19.10
Republican	Carmen María Montiel	5,110	6.71
Democratic	Isaiah Martin	4,337	5.69
Republican	Ollie Knox	3,131	4.11
Democratic	Stephen Huey	1,415	1.86
Republican	Ronald Whitfield	1,175	1.54
Republican	Carter Page	943	1.24
Republican	Theodis Daniel	937	1.23
Democratic	Valencia Williams	915	1.20
Independent	George Foreman IV	828	1.09
Democratic	Feldon Bonner II	555	0.73
Independent	Vince Duncan	407	0.53
Independent	Reyna Anderson	263	0.35
Green	Tammie Rochester	135	0.18
Total votes		76,189	100.00
General election
Democratic	Christian Menefee	16,174	68.38
Democratic	Amanda Edwards	7,478	31.62
Total votes		23,652	100.00
Democratic hold			

== See also ==
- List of United States congressional districts
