= Texas's 9th congressional district =

U.S. House district for Texas

Coordinates: 29°38′44″N 95°29′39″W

- Interactive map of district boundaries
- Representative: Al Green; D–Houston
- Distribution: 99.97% urban; 0.03% rural
- Population (2025): 787,190
- Median household income: $66,681
- Ethnicity: 39.3% Hispanic; 35.8% Black; 12.4% White; 9.7% Asian; 2.0% Two or more races; 0.7% other
- Cook PVI: R+9

Texas's 9th congressional district of the United States House of Representatives includes the southwestern portion of the Greater Houston area in Texas. The current Representative for the district, since 2005, is Democrat Al Green.

From 1967 to 2005, the 9th covered an area stretching from Galveston through Houston to Beaumont. Much of that area is now the 2nd district. Most of the area now in the 9th was in the 25th district from 1983 to 2005.

== Current composition ==
For the 118th and successive Congresses (based on redistricting following the 2020 census), the district contains all or portions of the following counties and communities:

Brazoria County (3)

Iowa Colony (part; also 22nd), Manvel (part; also 22nd), Pearland (part; also 22nd; shared with Fort Bend and Harris counties)

Fort Bend County (8)

Arcola (part; also 22nd), Fifth Street, Fresno, Houston (part; also 2nd, 7th, 8th, 18th, 22nd, 29th, 36th, 38th; shared with Harris and Montgomery counties), Missouri City (part; also 22nd; shared with Harris County), Pearland (part; also 22nd; shared with Brazoria and Harris counties), Sienna (part; also 22nd), Stafford (part; also 22nd; shared with Harris County)

Harris County (2)

Houston (part; also 2nd, 7th, 8th, 18th, 22nd, 29th, 36th, 38th; shared with Fort Bend and Montgomery counties), Pearland (part; also 22nd; shared with Brazoria and Fort Bend counties)

== Future composition ==
Beginning with the 2026 election, the 9th district will consist of the following counties:

- Harris (part)
- Liberty

== List of members representing the district ==
Member	Party	Term	Cong ess	Electoral history
District established March 4, 1883
Roger Q. Mills (Corsicana)	Democratic	March 4, 1883 – March 23, 1892	48th 49th 50th 51st 52nd	Redistricted from the 4th district and re-elected in 1882. Re-elected in 1884. Re-elected in 1886. Re-elected in 1888. Re-elected in 1890. Resigned when elected U.S. senator.
Vacant		March 23, 1892 – June 14, 1892	52nd	
Edwin Le Roy Antony (Cameron)	Democratic	June 14, 1892 – March 3, 1893	52nd	Elected to finish Mills's term. [data missing]
Joseph D. Sayers (Bastrop)	Democratic	March 4, 1893 – January 16, 1899	53rd 54th 55th	Redistricted from the 10th district and re-elected in 1892. Re-elected in 1894. Re-elected in 1896. Resigned when elected Governor of Texas.
Vacant		January 16, 1899 – March 3, 1899	55th	
Albert S. Burleson (Austin)	Democratic	March 4, 1899 – March 3, 1903	56th 57th	Elected in 1898. Re-elected in 1900. Redistricted to the 10th district.
George F. Burgess (Gonzales)	Democratic	March 4, 1903 – March 3, 1917	58th 59th 60th 61st 62nd 63rd 64th	Redistricted from the 10th district and re-elected in 1902. Re-elected in 1904. Re-elected in 1906. Re-elected in 1908. Re-elected in 1910. Re-elected in 1912. Re-elected in 1914. [data missing]
Joseph J. Mansfield (Columbus)	Democratic	March 4, 1917 – July 12, 1947	65th 66th 67th 68th 69th 70th 71st 72nd 73rd 74th 75th 76th 77th 78th 79th 80th	Elected in 1916. Re-elected in 1918. Re-elected in 1920. Re-elected in 1922. Re-elected in 1924. Re-elected in 1926. Re-elected in 1928. Re-elected in 1930. Re-elected in 1932. Re-elected in 1934. Re-elected in 1936. Re-elected in 1938. Re-elected in 1940. Re-elected in 1942. Re-elected in 1944. Re-elected in 1946. Died.
Vacant		July 12, 1947 – August 23, 1947	80th	
Clark W. Thompson (Galveston)	Democratic	August 23, 1947 – December 30, 1966	80th 81st 82nd 83rd 84th 85th 86th 87th 88th 89th	Elected to finish Mansfield's term. Re-elected in 1948. Re-elected in 1950. Re-elected in 1952. Re-elected in 1954. Re-elected in 1956. Re-elected in 1958. Re-elected in 1960. Re-elected in 1962. Re-elected in 1964. Resigned.
Vacant		December 30, 1966 – January 3, 1967	89th	
Jack Brooks (Beaumont)	Democratic	January 3, 1967 – January 3, 1995	90th 91st 92nd 93rd 94th 95th 96th 97th 98th 99th 100th 101st 102nd 103rd	Redistricted from the 2nd district and re-elected in 1966. Re-elected in 1968. Re-elected in 1970. Re-elected in 1972. Re-elected in 1974. Re-elected in 1976. Re-elected in 1978. Re-elected in 1980. Re-elected in 1982. Re-elected in 1984. Re-elected in 1986. Re-elected in 1988. Re-elected in 1990. Re-elected in 1992. Lost re-election.
Steve Stockman (Beaumont)	Republican	January 3, 1995 – January 3, 1997	104th	Elected in 1994. Lost re-election.
Nick Lampson (Beaumont)	Democratic	January 3, 1997 – January 3, 2005	105th 106th 107th 108th	Elected in 1996. Re-elected in 1998. Re-elected in 2000. Re-elected in 2002. Redistricted to the 2nd district.
Al Green (Houston)	Democratic	January 3, 2005 – present	109th 110th 111th 112th 113th 114th 115th 116th 117th 118th 119th	Elected in 2004. Re-elected in 2006. Re-elected in 2008. Re-elected in 2010. Re-elected in 2012. Re-elected in 2014. Re-elected in 2016. Re-elected in 2018. Re-elected in 2020. Re-elected in 2022. Re-elected in 2024. Redistricted to the 18th district.
Leticia Gutierrez (Houston)	Democratic	Assuming office on January 3, 2027		Elected in 2026.

== Recent election results from statewide races ==
=== 2023–2027 boundaries ===
Year	Office	Results
2008	President	Obama 75% - 25%
2012	President	Obama 76% - 24%
2014	Senate	Alameel 72% - 28%
2014	Governor	Davis 75% - 25%
2016	President	Clinton 77% - 20%
2018	Senate	O'Rourke 79% - 20%
2018	Governor	Valdez 73% - 25%
2018	Lt. Governor	Collier 77% - 21%
2018	Attorney General	Nelson 78% - 20%
2018	Comptroller of Public Accounts	Chevalier 75% - 22%
2020	President	Biden 76% - 23%
2020	Senate	Hegar 73% - 24%
2022	Governor	O'Rourke 76% - 23%
2022	Lt. Governor	Collier 74% - 23%
2022	Attorney General	Mercedes Garza 75% - 23%
2022	Comptroller of Public Accounts	Dudding 73% - 24%
2024	President	Harris 71% - 27%
2024	Senate	Allred 73% - 24%

=== 2027–2033 boundaries ===
Year	Office	Results
2008	President	McCain 56% - 44%
2012	President	Romney 56% - 44%
2014	Senate	Cornyn 63% - 37%
2014	Governor	Abbott 60% - 40%
2016	President	Trump 50% - 47%
2018	Senate	O'Rourke 50% - 49%
2018	Governor	Abbott 53% - 46%
2018	Lt. Governor	Patrick 50% - 49%
2018	Attorney General	Nelson 50% - 49%
2018	Comptroller of Public Accounts	Hegar 50% - 47%
2020	President	Trump 54% - 45%
2020	Senate	Cornyn 54% - 44%
2022	Governor	Abbott 56% - 43%
2022	Lt. Governor	Patrick 56% - 42%
2022	Attorney General	Paxton 55% - 42%
2022	Comptroller of Public Accounts	Hegar 57% - 40%
2024	President	Trump 59% - 40%
2024	Senate	Cruz 54% - 43%
2026	Senate	Talarico 58% - 39%
2026	Governor	Hinojosa 58% - 41%

== Election results ==
=== 2004 ===
US House election, 2004: Texas District 9
Party	Candidate	Votes	%	±%
Democratic	Al Green	114,462	72.2	+13.6
Republican	Arlette Molina	42,132	26.6	−13.7
Libertarian	Stacey Bourland	1,972	1.2	+0.2
Majority		72,330	45.6	
Turnout		158,566		
Democratic hold		Swing	+13.7	

=== 2006 ===
US House election, 2006: Texas District 9
Party	Candidate	Votes	%	±%
Democratic	Al Green (incumbent)	60,253	100	+27.8
Majority		60,253	100	
Turnout		60,253		
Democratic hold		Swing	+54.4	

=== 2008 ===
US House election, 2008: Texas District 9
Party	Candidate	Votes	%	±%
Democratic	Al Green (incumbent)	143,868	93.65	−6.35
Libertarian	Brad Walters	9,760	6.35	+6.35
Majority		134,108	87.30	−12.70
Turnout		153,628		
Democratic hold		Swing		

=== 2010 ===
US House election, 2010: Texas District 9
Party	Candidate	Votes	%	±%
Democratic	Al Green (incumbent)	80,107	75.74	−17.91
Republican	Steve Mueller	24,201	22.88	+22.88
Libertarian	Michael W. Hope	1,459	1.38	−4.97
Majority		55,906	52.86	−34.44
Turnout		105,767		
Democratic hold		Swing		

=== 2012 ===
US House election, 2012: Texas District 9
Party	Candidate	Votes	%	±%
Democratic	Al Green (incumbent)	144,075	78.49	+2.75
Republican	Steve Mueller	36,139	19.69	−3.19
Green	Vanessa Foster	1,743	0.95	+0.95
Libertarian	John Wieder	1,609	0.88	−0.50
Majority		107,936	58.80	+5.94
Turnout		183,566		
Democratic hold		Swing		

=== 2014 ===
US House election, 2014: Texas District 9
Party	Candidate	Votes	%	±%
Democratic	Al Green (incumbent)	78,109	90.82	+12.33
Libertarian	Johnny Johnson	7,894	9.18	+8.30
Majority		70,215	81.64	+22.84
Turnout		86,003		
Democratic hold		Swing		

=== 2016 ===
US House election, 2016: Texas District 9
Party	Candidate	Votes	%	±%
Democratic	Al Green (incumbent)	152,032	80.64	−10.18
Republican	Jeff Martin	36,491	19.36	+19.36
Majority		115,541	61.28	−20.36
Turnout		188,523		
Democratic hold		Swing		

=== 2018 ===
US House election, 2018: Texas District 9
Party	Candidate	Votes	%	±%
Democratic	Al Green (incumbent)	136,256	89.06	+8.42
Libertarian	Phil Kurtz	5,940	3.88	+3.88
Independent	Benjamin Hernandez	5,774	3.77	+3.77
Independent	Kesha Rogers	5,031	3.29	+3.29
Majority		130,316	85.18	+23.90
Turnout		153,001		
Democratic hold		Swing		

=== 2020 ===
US House election, 2020: Texas District 9
Party	Candidate	Votes	%
Democratic	Al Green (incumbent)	172,938	75.5
Republican	Johnny Teague	49,575	21.6
Libertarian	Joe Sosa	6,594	2.9
Total votes		229,107	100.0
Democratic hold			

=== 2022 ===
US House election, 2022: Texas District 9
Party	Candidate	Votes	%
Democratic	Al Green (incumbent)	125,446	76.7
Republican	Jimmy Leon	38,161	23.3
Total votes		163,607	100.0
Democratic hold			

=== 2024 ===
US House election, 2024: Texas District 9
Party	Candidate	Votes	%
Democratic	Al Green (incumbent)	184,141	100.0
Total votes		184,141	100.0
Democratic hold			

=== 2026 ===
US House election, 2026: Texas District 9
Party	Candidate	Votes	%
Democratic	Leticia Gutierrez	98,079	57.55
Republican	Alex Mealer	72,340	42.45
Total votes		170,419	92.0
Democratic hold			

== Historical district boundaries ==
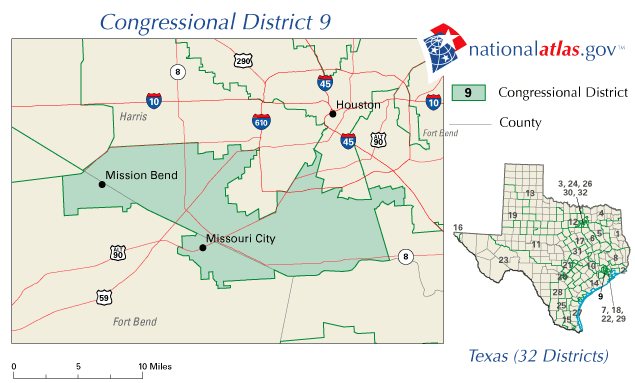
2007–2013

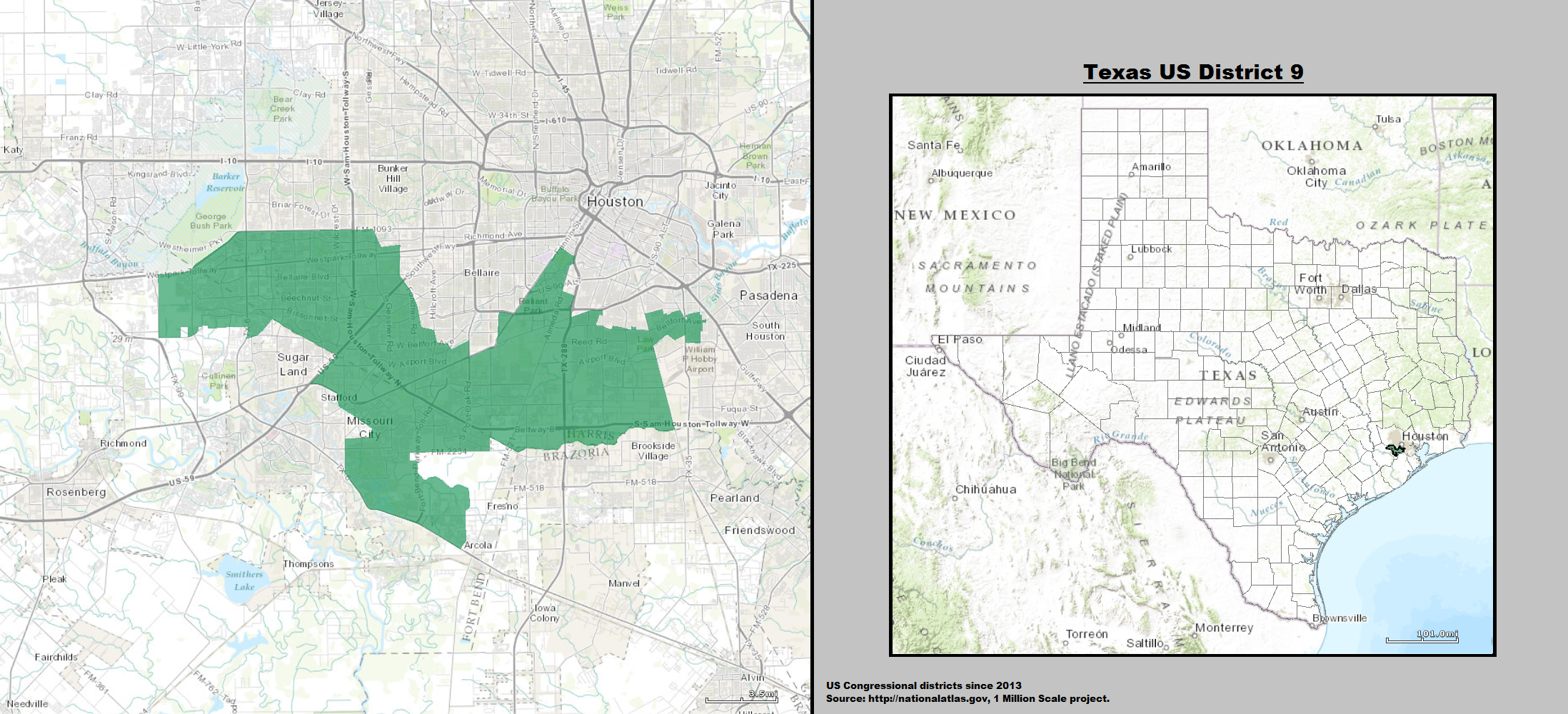
2013–2023

From 1967 to 2005, the district included the Johnson Space Center, and from 1935 to 2005, it took in Galveston.

== See also ==
- List of United States congressional districts
