= Texas's 20th congressional district =

U.S. House district for Texas

Coordinates: 29°28′28″N 98°37′21″W

- Interactive map of district boundaries
- Representative: Joaquin Castro; D–San Antonio
- Distribution: 99.62% urban; 0.38% rural
- Population (2025): 798,119
- Median household income: $66,561
- Ethnicity: 70.5% Hispanic; 17.6% White; 5.6% Black; 3.4% Asian; 2.2% Two or more races; 0.7% other
- Cook PVI: D+12

Texas's 20th congressional district of the United States House of Representatives includes the western half of San Antonio and Bexar County in Texas. The district is heavily Latino/Hispanic (predominantly of Mexican descent), as is the surrounding area. Charlie Gonzalez, who represented the district from 1999 to 2013 after succeeding his father, Henry B. González, did not seek re-election in the 2012 United States House of Representatives elections. State representative Joaquin Castro, the Democratic nominee to replace Gonzalez, defeated David Rosa, the Republican nominee, in the race for Texas's 20th district on November 6, 2012. His term began on January 3, 2013.

The 20th district is heavily Democratic. It has never sent a Republican to Congress, and has not supported a Republican for president since 1956. In 1972, this was one of two congressional districts in the state of Texas to vote for George McGovern (the other being the 18th district in Houston). In 1984, this district gave Walter Mondale 59% of its vote.

== Recent election results from statewide races ==
=== 2023–2027 boundaries ===
Year	Office	Results
2008	President	Obama 62% - 38%
2012	President	Obama 63% - 37%
2014	Senate	Alameel 55% - 45%
2014	Governor	Davis 60% - 40%
2016	President	Clinton 63% - 31%
2018	Senate	O'Rourke 69% - 30%
2018	Governor	Valdez 62% - 36%
2018	Lt. Governor	Collier 65% - 33%
2018	Attorney General	Nelson 67% - 30%
2018	Comptroller of Public Accounts	Chevalier 64% - 31%
2020	President	Biden 66% - 33%
2020	Senate	Hegar 62% - 34%
2022	Governor	O'Rourke 66% - 32%
2022	Lt. Governor	Collier 63% - 33%
2022	Attorney General	Mercedes Garza 65% - 32%
2022	Comptroller of Public Accounts	Dudding 62% - 33%
2024	President	Harris 60% - 39%
2024	Senate	Allred 63% - 34%

=== 2027–2033 boundaries ===
Year	Office	Results
2008	President	Obama 66% - 33%
2012	President	Obama 69% - 31%
2014	Senate	Alameel 61% - 39%
2014	Governor	Davis 66% - 34%
2016	President	Clinton 67% - 27%
2018	Senate	O'Rourke 73% - 26%
2018	Governor	Valdez 66% - 32%
2018	Lt. Governor	Collier 69% - 29%
2018	Attorney General	Nelson 71% - 26%
2018	Comptroller of Public Accounts	Chevalier 68% - 28%
2020	President	Biden 69% - 29%
2020	Senate	Hegar 66% - 31%
2022	Governor	O'Rourke 70% - 29%
2022	Lt. Governor	Collier 67% - 29%
2022	Attorney General	Mercedes Garza 69% - 28%
2022	Comptroller of Public Accounts	Dudding 66% - 30%
2024	President	Harris 63% - 35%
2024	Senate	Allred 67% - 31%
2026	Senate	Talarico 76% - 21%
2026	Governor	Hinojosa 75% - 22%

== Composition ==
For the 118th and successive Congresses (based on redistricting following the 2020 census), the district contains all or portions of the following counties and communities:

Bexar County (3)

Balcones Heights, Leon Valley, San Antonio (part; also 21st, 23rd, 28th, 35th; shared with Comal and Medina counties)

== List of members representing the district ==
Member	Party	Years	Cong ress	Electoral history
District established January 3, 1935
Maury Maverick (San Antonio)	Democratic	January 3, 1935 – January 3, 1939	74th 75th	Elected in 1934. Re-elected in 1936. Lost renomination.
Paul J. Kilday (San Antonio)	Democratic	January 3, 1939 – September 24, 1961	76th 77th 78th 79th 80th 81st 82nd 83rd 84th 85th 86th 87th	Elected in 1938. Re-elected in 1940. Re-elected in 1942. Re-elected in 1944. Re-elected in 1946. Re-elected in 1948. Re-elected in 1950. Re-elected in 1952. Re-elected in 1954. Re-elected in 1956. Re-elected in 1958. Re-elected in 1960 Resigned to become Judge of the U.S. Court of Appeals for the Armed Forces.
Vacant		September 24, 1961 – November 4, 1961	87th	
Henry B. González (San Antonio)	Democratic	November 4, 1961 – January 3, 1999	87th 88th 89th 90th 91st 92nd 93rd 94th 95th 96th 97th 98th 99th 100th 101st 102nd 103rd 104th 105th	Elected to finish Kilday's term. Re-elected in 1960. Re-elected in 1962. Re-elected in 1964. Re-elected in 1966. Re-elected in 1968. Re-elected in 1970. Re-elected in 1972. Re-elected in 1974. Re-elected in 1976. Re-elected in 1978. Re-elected in 1980. Re-elected in 1982. Re-elected in 1984. Re-elected in 1986. Re-elected in 1988. Re-elected in 1990. Re-elected in 1992. Re-elected in 1994. Re-elected in 1996. Retired.
Charlie Gonzalez (San Antonio)	Democratic	January 3, 1999 – January 3, 2013	106th 107th 108th 109th 110th 111th 112th	Elected in 1998. Re-elected in 2000. Re-elected in 2002. Re-elected in 2004. Re-elected in 2006. Re-elected in 2008. Re-elected in 2010. Retired.
Joaquin Castro (San Antonio)	Democratic	January 3, 2013 – present	113th 114th 115th 116th 117th 118th 119th	Elected in 2012. Re-elected in 2014. Re-elected in 2016. Re-elected in 2018. Re-elected in 2020. Re-elected in 2022. Re-elected in 2024. Re-elected in 2026.

== Selected recent election results ==
=== 2006 election ===
United States House of Representatives elections in Texas, 2006: Texas District 20
Party	Candidate	Votes	%	±%
Democratic	Charlie Gonzalez (incumbent)	112,480	65.5%	−34.5%
Republican	Roger Scott	54,976	32.0%	+32.0%
Libertarian	Jessie Bouley	2,377	1.4%	+1.4%
Independent	Michael Idrogo	1,971	1.1%	+1.1%
Majority		57,504	33.5%	
Turnout		171,804		
Democratic hold		Swing	-33.3%	

=== 2012 election ===
Democratic challenger Joaquin Castro defeated Republican challenger David Rosa in the race for Texas's 20th district on November 6, 2012. Prior to being elected, Castro served as a state representative of the Texas House from the state's 125th District.

United States House of Representatives elections in Texas, 2012: Texas District 20
Party	Candidate	Votes	%
Democratic	Joaquin Castro	118,719	64.00%
Republican	David Rosa	62,041	33.44%
Libertarian	A.E. Potts	3,117	1.68%
Green	Antonio Diaz	1,621	0.87%
Total votes		185,498	100.00%

=== 2014 election ===
Democratic incumbent Joaquin Castro defeated Libertarian challenger Jeffrey Blunt in the race for Texas's 20th district on November 4, 2014.

United States House of Representatives elections in Texas, 2014: Texas District 20
Party	Candidate	Votes	%
Democratic	Joaquin Castro (incumbent)	66,554	75.7%
Libertarian	Jeffrey Blunt	21,410	24.3%
Total votes		87,964	100.0%

=== 2016 election ===
Democratic incumbent Joaquin Castro defeated Libertarian challenger Jeffrey Blunt and Green Party challenger Paul Pipkin in the race for Texas's 20th district on November 8, 2016.

United States House of Representatives elections in Texas, 2016: Texas District 20
Party	Candidate	Votes	%
Democratic	Joaquin Castro (incumbent)	149,522	80%
Libertarian	Jeffrey Blunt	29,023	15%
Green	Paul Pipkin	8,969	5%

=== 2018 election ===
Democratic incumbent Joaquin Castro defeated Libertarian challenger Jeffrey Blunt in the race for Texas's 20th district on November 6, 2018

United States House of Representatives elections in Texas, 2018: Texas District 20
Party	Candidate	Votes	%
Democratic	Joaquin Castro (incumbent)	139,038	80%
Libertarian	Jeffrey Blunt	32,925	19%

=== 2020 election ===
United States House of Representatives elections in Texas, 2020: Texas District 20
Party	Candidate	Votes	%
Democratic	Joaquín Castro (incumbent)	175,078	64.7
Republican	Mauro Garza	89,628	33.1
Libertarian	Jeffrey Blunt	6,017	2.2

=== 2022 election ===
2022 United States House of Representatives elections in Texas: Texas District 20
Party	Candidate	Votes	%
Democratic	Joaquin Castro (incumbent)	115,352	68.4
Republican	Kyle Sinclair	53,226	31.5
Write-in	Adam Jonasz	21	0.01

=== 2024 election ===
2024 United States House of Representatives elections in Texas: Texas District 20
Party	Candidate	Votes	%
Democratic	Joaquin Castro (incumbent)	157,890	100.0
Total votes		157,890	100.0
Democratic hold			

== Historical district boundaries ==
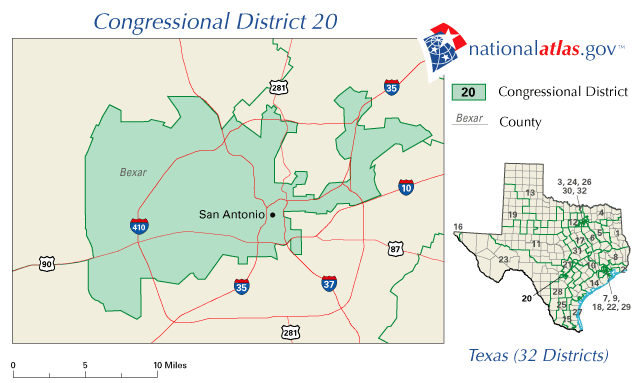
2007–2013

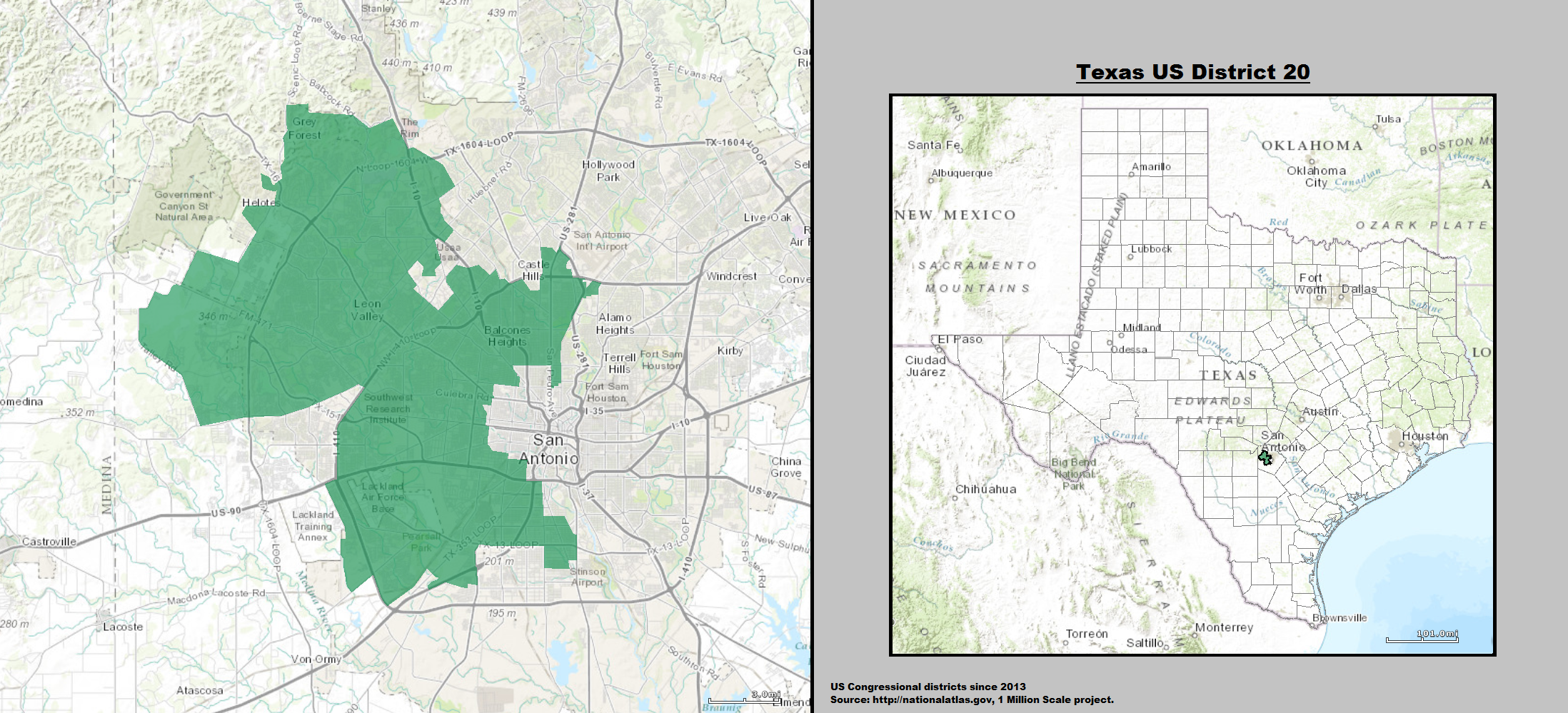
2013–2023

== See also ==
- List of United States congressional districts
