= Texas's 5th congressional district =

U.S. House district for Texas

Coordinates: 32°13′33″N 95°43′54″W

- Interactive map of district boundaries
- Representative: Lance Gooden; R–Sunnyvale
- Area: 5,043.85 mi^{2} (13,063.5 km^{2})
- Distribution: 67.16% urban; 32.84% rural
- Population (2025): 865,794
- Median household income: $81,241
- Ethnicity: 47.9% White; 29.5% Hispanic; 13.8% Black; 4.6% Asian; 3.4% Two or more races; 0.8% other
- Cook PVI: R+13

Texas's 5th congressional district of the United States House of Representatives is in an area that includes a northeast portion of Dallas County, including Mesquite plus a number of smaller suburban, exurban and rural counties south and east of Dallas, including Henderson, Van Zandt, Kaufman, Wood, and part of Upshur. As of the 2000 census, the 5th district represents 651,620 people.

The current representative from the 5th district is Lance Gooden, who won re-election in 2020 by defeating Democratic candidate Carolyn Salter.

== 2012 redistricting ==
After the 2012 redistricting process, the eastern half of Wood County was removed, and there were slight changes to the district in Dallas County.

== Recent election results from statewide races ==
=== 2023–2027 boundaries ===
Year	Office	Results
2008	President	McCain 63% - 36%
2012	President	Romney 66% - 34%
2014	Senate	Cornyn 72% - 28%
2014	Governor	Abbott 68% - 32%
2016	President	Trump 63% - 34%
2018	Senate	Cruz 60% - 39%
2018	Governor	Abbott 64% - 35%
2018	Lt. Governor	Patrick 60% - 38%
2018	Attorney General	Paxton 59% - 39%
2018	Comptroller of Public Accounts	Hegar 61% - 36%
2020	President	Trump 61% - 38%
2020	Senate	Cornyn 61% - 36%
2022	Governor	Abbott 63% - 35%
2022	Lt. Governor	Patrick 62% - 36%
2022	Attorney General	Paxton 62% - 35%
2022	Comptroller of Public Accounts	Hegar 64% - 33%
2024	President	Trump 63% - 36%
2024	Senate	Cruz 60% - 38%

=== 2027–2033 boundaries ===
Year	Office	Results
2008	President	McCain 61% - 38%
2012	President	Romney 64% - 36%
2014	Senate	Cornyn 69% - 31%
2014	Governor	Abbott 65% - 35%
2016	President	Trump 60% - 37%
2018	Senate	Cruz 57% - 42%
2018	Governor	Abbott 62% - 37%
2018	Lt. Governor	Patrick 57% - 41%
2018	Attorney General	Paxton 56% - 41%
2018	Comptroller of Public Accounts	Hegar 59% - 38%
2020	President	Trump 57% - 41%
2020	Senate	Cornyn 59% - 39%
2022	Governor	Abbott 60% - 39%
2022	Lt. Governor	Patrick 59% - 39%
2022	Attorney General	Paxton 58% - 38%
2022	Comptroller of Public Accounts	Hegar 62% - 36%
2024	President	Trump 60% - 39%
2024	Senate	Cruz 57% - 41%
2026	Senate	Talarico 51% - 47%
2026	Governor	Abbott 49.5% - 48.6%

== Current composition ==
For the 118th and successive Congresses (based on redistricting following the 2020 census), the district contains all or portions of the following counties and communities:

Dallas County (9)

Combine (shared with Kaufman County), Dallas (part; also 3rd, 4th, 6th, 24th, 30th, 32nd, and 33rd; shared with Collin, Denton, Kaufman, and Rockwall counties), Garland (part; shared with 32nd), Mesquite (part; also 32nd; shared with Kaufman County), Rowlett, Sachse (part; also 3rd; shared with Collin County), Seagoville (shared with Kaufman County), Sunnyvale, Wylie (part; also 3rd; shared with Collin County)

Henderson County (21)

All 21 communities

Kaufman County (24)

All 24 communities

Upshur County (1)

Ore City

Van Zandt County (10)

All 10 communities

Wood County (7)

All 7 communities

== Future composition ==
Beginning with the 2026 election, the 5th district will consist of the following counties:

- Anderson
- Dallas (part)
- Henderson
- Kaufman
- Van Zandt

== List of members representing the district ==
U.S. congressional district borders are periodically redrawn, therefore some district residence locations may no longer be in the 5th district.

Name	Party	Years	Cong– ress	Electoral history
District established March 4, 1875
John Hancock (Austin)	Democratic	March 4, 1875 – March 3, 1877	44th	Redistricted from the 4th district re-elected in 1874. [data missing]
Dewitt Clinton Giddings (Brenham)	Democratic	March 4, 1877 – March 3, 1879	45th	Elected in 1876. [data missing]
George Washington Jones (Bastrop)	Greenback	March 4, 1879 – March 3, 1883	46th 47th	Elected in 1878. Re-elected in 1880. [data missing]
James W. Throckmorton (McKinney)	Democratic	March 4, 1883 – March 3, 1887	48th 49th	Elected in 1882. Re-elected in 1884. [data missing]
Silas Hare (Sherman)	Democratic	March 4, 1887 – March 3, 1891	50th 51st	Elected in 1886. Re-elected in 1888. [data missing]
Joseph W. Bailey (Gainesville)	Democratic	March 4, 1891 – March 3, 1901	52nd 53rd 54th 55th 56th	Elected in 1890. Re-elected in 1892. Re-elected in 1894. Re-elected in 1896. Re-elected in 1898. [data missing]
Choice B. Randell (Sherman)	Democratic	March 4, 1901 – March 3, 1903	57th	Elected in 1900. Redistricted to the 4th district.
James Andrew Beall (Waxahachie)	Democratic	March 4, 1903 – March 3, 1915	58th 59th 60th 61st 62nd 63rd	Elected in 1902. Re-elected in 1904. Re-elected in 1906. Re-elected in 1908. Re-elected in 1910. Re-elected in 1912. Retired.
Hatton W. Sumners (Dallas)	Democratic	March 4, 1915 – January 3, 1947	64th 65th 66th 67th 68th 69th 70th 71st 72nd 73rd 74th 75th 76th 77th 78th 79th	Redistricted from the at-large seat and re-elected in 1914. Re-elected in 1916. Re-elected in 1918. Re-elected in 1920. Re-elected in 1922. Re-elected in 1924. Re-elected in 1926. Re-elected in 1928. Re-elected in 1930. Re-elected in 1932. Re-elected in 1934. Re-elected in 1936. Re-elected in 1938. Re-elected in 1940. Re-elected in 1942. Re-elected in 1944. Retired.
Joseph Franklin Wilson (Dallas)	Democratic	January 3, 1947 – January 3, 1955	80th 81st 82nd 83rd	Elected in 1946. Re-elected in 1948. Re-elected in 1950. Re-elected in 1952. Retired.
Bruce Alger (Dallas)	Republican	January 3, 1955 – January 3, 1965	84th 85th 86th 87th 88th	Elected in 1954. Re-elected in 1956. Re-elected in 1958. Re-elected in 1960. Re-elected in 1962. Lost re-election.
Earle Cabell (Dallas)	Democratic	January 3, 1965 – January 3, 1973	89th 90th 91st 92nd	Elected in 1964. Re-elected in 1966. Re-elected in 1968. Re-elected in 1970. Lost re-election.
Alan Steelman (Mesquite)	Republican	January 3, 1973 – January 3, 1977	93rd 94th	Elected in 1972. Re-elected in 1974. Retired to run for U.S. senator.
Jim Mattox (Dallas)	Democratic	January 3, 1977 – January 3, 1983	95th 96th 97th	Elected in 1976. Re-elected in 1978. Re-elected in 1980. Retired to run for Texas Attorney General.
John Wiley Bryant (Dallas)	Democratic	January 3, 1983 – January 3, 1997	98th 99th 100th 101st 102nd 103rd 104th	Elected in 1982. Re-elected in 1984. Re-elected in 1986. Re-elected in 1988. Re-elected in 1990. Re-elected in 1992. Re-elected in 1994. Retired to run for U.S. senator.
Pete Sessions (Dallas)	Republican	January 3, 1997 – January 3, 2003	105th 106th 107th	Elected in 1996. Re-elected in 1998. Re-elected in 2000. Redistricted to the 32nd district.
Jeb Hensarling (Dallas)	Republican	January 3, 2003 – January 3, 2019	108th 109th 110th 111th 112th 113th 114th 115th	Elected in 2002. Re-elected in 2004. Re-elected in 2006. Re-elected in 2008. Re-elected in 2010. Re-elected in 2012. Re-elected in 2014. Re-elected in 2016. Retired.
Lance Gooden (Sunnyvale)	Republican	January 3, 2019 – present	116th 117th 118th 119th	Elected in 2018. Re-elected in 2020. Re-elected in 2022. Re-elected in 2024. Re-elected in 2026.

== Election results ==
=== 2004 ===
US House election, 2004: Texas District 5
Party	Candidate	Votes	%
Republican	Jeb Hensarling (incumbent)	148,816	64.5
Democratic	Bill Bernstein	75,911	32.9
Libertarian	John Gonzalez	6,118	2.7
Total votes		230,845	
Republican hold			

=== 2006 ===
US House election, 2006: Texas District 5
Party	Candidate	Votes	%
Republican	Jeb Hensarling (incumbent)	88,478	61.76
Democratic	Charlie Thompson	50,983	35.58
Libertarian	Mike Nelson	3,791	2.64
Total votes		143,252	
Republican hold			

=== 2008 ===
US House election, 2008: Texas District 5
Party	Candidate	Votes	%
Republican	Jeb Hensarling (incumbent)	162,894	83.59
Libertarian	Ken Ashby	31,967	16.40
Total votes		194,861	
Republican hold			

=== 2010 ===
US House election, 2010: Texas District 5
Party	Candidate	Votes	%
Republican	Jeb Hensarling (incumbent)	106,742	70.52
Democratic	Tom Berry	41,649	27.51
Libertarian	Ken Ashby	2,958	1.95
Total votes		151,349	
Republican hold			

=== 2012 ===
US House election, 2012: Texas District 5
Party	Candidate	Votes	%
Republican	Jeb Hensarling (incumbent)	134,091	64.40
Democratic	Linda S. Mrosko	69,178	33.22
Libertarian	Ken Ashby	4,961	2.38
Total votes		208,230	
Republican hold			

=== 2014 ===
US House election, 2014: Texas District 5
Party	Candidate	Votes	%
Republican	Jeb Hensarling (incumbent)	88,998	85.4
Libertarian	Ken Ashby	15,264	14.6
Total votes		104,262	
Republican hold			

=== 2016 ===
US House election, 2016: Texas District 5
Party	Candidate	Votes	%
Republican	Jeb Hensarling (incumbent)	155,469	80.6
Libertarian	Ken Ashby	37,406	19.4
Total votes		192,875	
Republican hold			

=== 2018 ===
US House election, 2018: Texas District 5
Party	Candidate	Votes	%
Republican	Lance Gooden	130,617	62.4
Democratic	Dan Wood	78,666	37.6
Total votes		209,283	100.0
Republican hold			

=== 2020 ===
2020 United States House of Representatives elections in Texas: Texas District 5
Party	Candidate	Votes	%	±%
Republican	Lance Gooden (incumbent)	173,251	61.99	−0.35
Democratic	Carolyn Salter	100,413	35.93	−1.62
Independent	Kevin A. Hale	5,814	2.08	+2.08
Total votes		279,478	100.0	
Republican hold		Swing		

=== 2022 ===
US House election, 2022: Texas District 5
Party	Candidate	Votes	%
Republican	Lance Gooden (incumbent)	135,595	63.97
Democratic	Tartisha Hill	71,930	33.93
Libertarian	Kevin Hale	4,293	2.03
Write-in	Ruth Torres	147	0.07
Total votes		211,965	100.0
Republican hold			

=== 2024 ===
2024 United States House of Representatives elections in Texas
Party	Candidate	Votes	%
Republican	Lance Gooden (incumbent)	192,185	64.1
Democratic	Ruth Torres	107,712	35.9
Total votes		299,897	100.0
Republican hold			

=== 2026 ===
2026 Texas's 5th congressional district election
Party	Candidate	Votes	%
Republican	Lance Gooden (incumbent)	130,278	51.5
Democratic	Chelsey Hockett	122,855	48.5
Total votes		253,133	100.0
Republican hold			

== Historical district boundaries ==
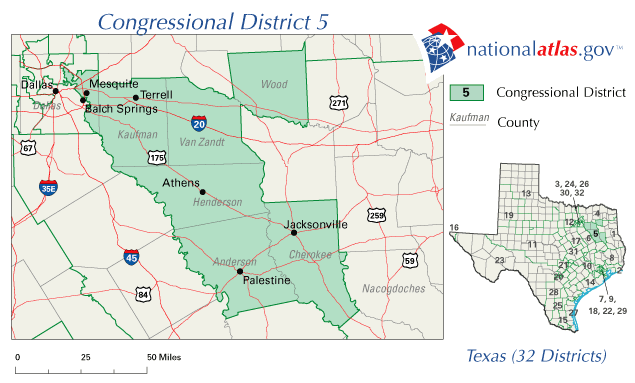
2007–2013

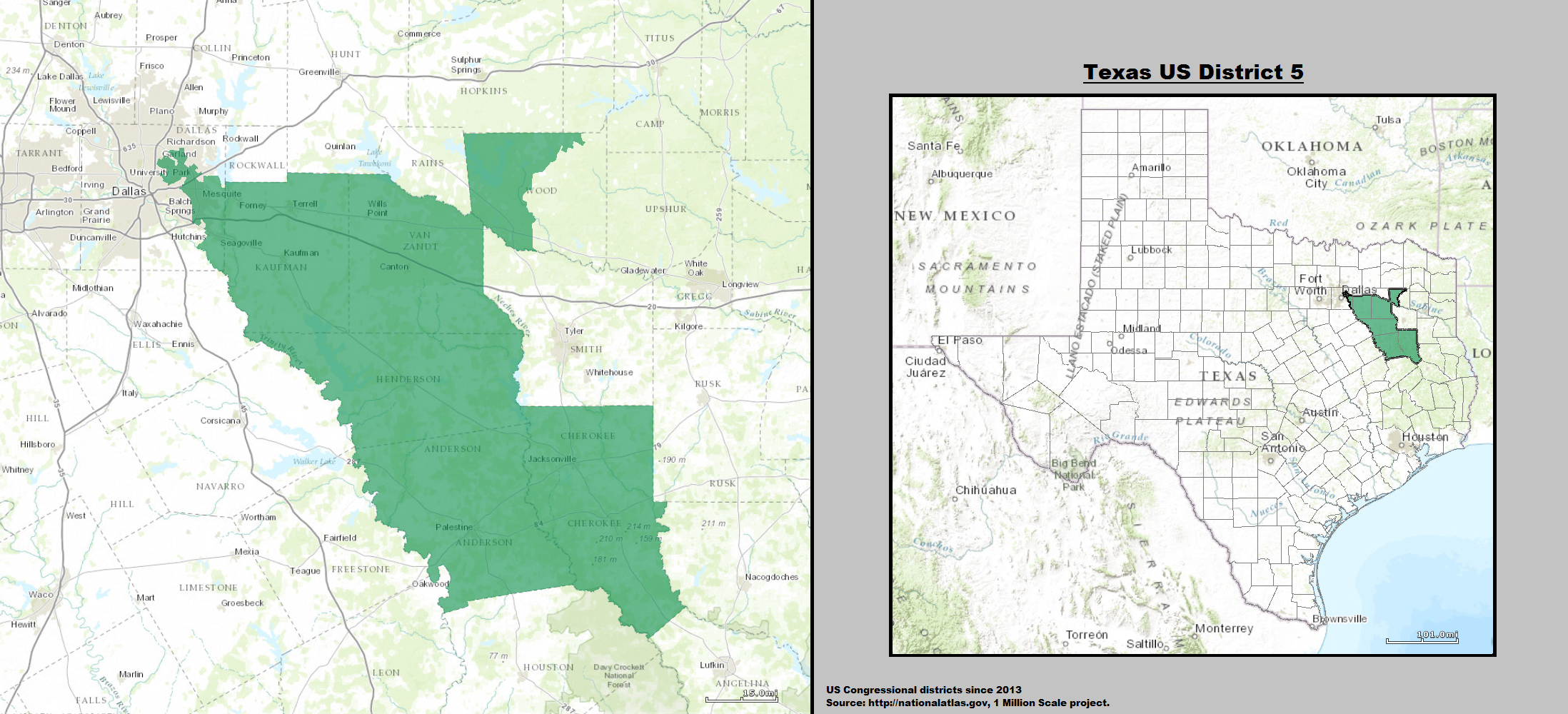
2013–2023

== See also ==
- List of United States congressional districts
