= Electoral history of Ken Paxton =

Paxton in 2025

Ken Paxton, the 51st attorney general of Texas (2015–present), has run for public office several times, beginning in 2002. He is a member of the Republican Party, one of two major parties in the United States. Paxton served as the Texas state senator from the 8th district and Texas state representative from the 70th district (2003–2013). He was the party's nominee for U.S. Senate in the 2026 election, defeating Republican incumbent John Cornyn in the primary, however being defeated by the Democratic nominee James Talarico in the general election.

== Texas House of Representatives ==
=== 2002 ===
2002 Texas House of Representatives 70th district Republican primary election
Party	Candidate	Votes	%
Republican	Ken Paxton	2,168	39.45
Republican	Bill Vitz	1,171	21.31
Republican	Matt Matthews	1,100	20.02
Republican	Robert Rankins	954	17.36
Republican	Harry Pierce	102	1.86
Total votes		5,495	100.00

2002 Texas House of Representatives 70th district Republican primary runoff election
Party	Candidate	Votes	%
Republican	Ken Paxton	2,775	63.33
Republican	Bill Vitz	1,607	36.67
Total votes		4,382	100.00

2002 Texas House of Representatives 70th district general election
Party	Candidate	Votes	%
Republican	Ken Paxton	28,012	78.50
Democratic	Fred Lusk	7,074	19.82
Libertarian	Robert Worthington	600	1.68
Total votes		35,686	100.00
Republican gain from Democratic			

=== 2004 ===
2004 Texas House of Representatives 70th district general election
Party	Candidate	Votes	%
Republican	Ken Paxton (incumbent)	58,250	76.03
Democratic	Martin Woodward	18,451	23.97
Total votes		76,701	100.00
Republican hold			

=== 2006 ===
2006 Texas House of Representatives 70th district general election
Party	Candidate	Votes	%
Republican	Ken Paxton (incumbent)	30,062	69.03
Democratic	Rick Koster	12,265	28.16
Libertarian	Robert Virasin	1,222	2.81
Total votes		43,549	100.00
Republican hold			

=== 2008 ===
2008 Texas House of Representatives 70th district general election
Party	Candidate	Votes	%
Republican	Ken Paxton (incumbent)	73,450	86.21
Libertarian	Robert Virasin	11,751	13.79
Total votes		85,201	100.00
Republican hold			

=== 2010 ===
2010 Texas House of Representatives 70th district general election
Party	Candidate	Votes	%
Republican	Ken Paxton (incumbent)	43,006	100.00
Total votes		43,006	100.00
Republican hold			

== Texas Senate ==
=== 2012 ===
2012 Texas Senate 8th district general election
Party	Candidate	Votes	%
Republican	Ken Paxton	178,238	62.29
Democratic	Jack Ternan Jr.	99,010	34.60
Libertarian	Ed Kless	8,899	3.11
Total votes		286,147	100.00
Republican hold			

== Texas attorney general ==
2014 primary election results by county

=== 2014 ===
2014 Texas attorney general Republican primary election
Party	Candidate	Votes	%
Republican	Ken Paxton	569,034	44.45
Republican	Dan Branch	428,325	33.46
Republican	Barry Smitherman	282,701	22.08
Total votes		1,280,060	100.00

2014 general election results by county

2014 Texas attorney general Republican primary runoff election
Party	Candidate	Votes	%
Republican	Ken Paxton	466,407	63.41
Republican	Dan Branch	269,098	36.59
Total votes		735,505	100.00

2018 general election results by county

2014 Texas attorney general general election
Party	Candidate	Votes	%
Republican	Ken Paxton	2,743,473	58.82
Democratic	Sam Houston	1,773,250	38.02
Libertarian	Jamie Balagia	118,197	2.53
Green	Jamar Osborne	29,591	0.63
Total votes		4,664,511	100.00
Republican hold			

=== 2018 ===
2022 primary election results by county

2018 Texas attorney general general election
Party	Candidate	Votes	%
Republican	Ken Paxton	4,172,599	50.60
Democratic	Justin Nelson	3,873,186	47.00
Libertarian	Michael Ray Harris	200,407	2.40
Total votes		8,246,192	100.00
Republican hold			

=== 2022 ===
2022 primary runoff election results by county

2022 Texas attorney general Republican primary election
Party	Candidate	Votes	%
Republican	Ken Paxton	820,602	42.71
Republican	George P. Bush	437,784	22.78
Republican	Eva Guzman	336,814	17.53
Republican	Louie Gohmert	326,186	16.98
Total votes		1,921,386	100.00

2022 Texas attorney general Republican primary runoff election
Party	Candidate	Votes	%
Republican	Ken Paxton	633,223	67.96
Republican	George P. Bush	298,577	32.04
Total votes		931,800	100.00

2022 general election results by county

2022 Texas attorney general general election
Party	Candidate	Votes	%
Republican	Ken Paxton	4,278,986	53.42
Democratic	Rochelle Mercedes Garza	3,497,267	43.66
Libertarian	Mark Ash	233,750	2.92
Total votes		8,010,003	100.00
Republican hold			

== U.S. Senate ==
=== 2026 ===
2026 primary runoff election results by county

2026 United States Senate Republican primary results
Party	Candidate	Votes	%
Republican	John Cornyn (incumbent)	910,382	42.0
Republican	Ken Paxton	878,564	40.5
Republican	Wesley Hunt	293,250	13.5
Republican	Sara Canady	26,355	1.2
Republican	Anna Bender	24,167	1.1
Republican	Gulrez Khan	15,873	0.7
Republican	John Adefope	9,284	0.4
Republican	Virgil Bierschwale	9,035	0.4
Total votes		2,166,910	100.0

2026 United States Senate Republican primary runoff results
Party	Candidate	Votes	%
Republican	Ken Paxton	890,436	63.84
Republican	John Cornyn (incumbent)	504,325	36.16
Total votes		1,394,761	100.0

2026 United States Senate election results
Party	Candidate	Votes	%
Democratic	James Talarico	5,447,080	55.07
Republican	Ken Paxton	4,250,704	42.97
Libertarian	Ted Brown	190,293	1.92
