= Lee Merritt =

US civil rights lawyer and activist

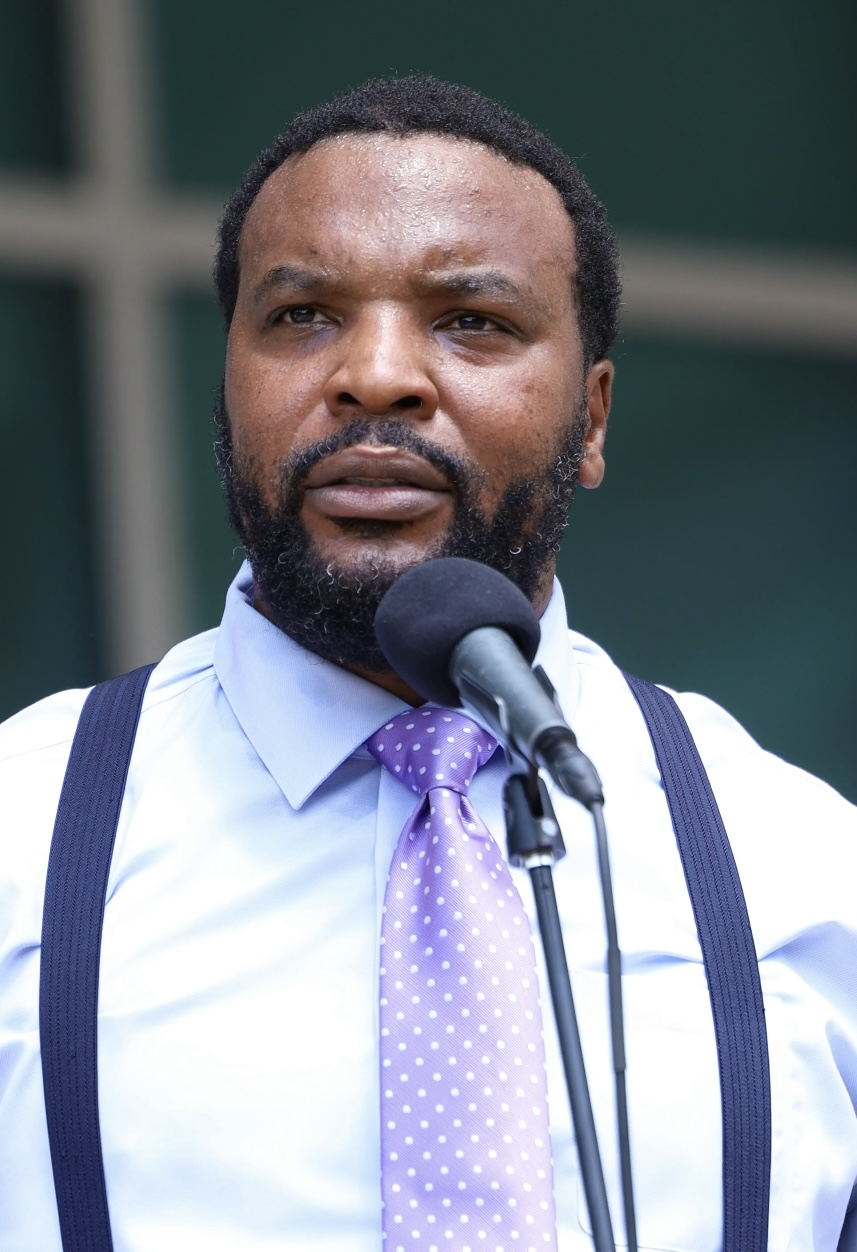
- Merritt in 2024

Personal details
- Born: Stacy Sylvester Lee Merritt; February 1, 1983 (age 43) Los Angeles, California, U.S.
- Party: Democratic
- Education: Morehouse College (BA); Temple University (JD)

S. Lee Merritt (born Stacy Sylvester Lee Merritt) is an American civil rights lawyer and activist, most known for his work on racial justice issues.

On March 20, 2021, Merritt announced on Twitter his proposal to run for Texas attorney general, saying "Texas deserves an attorney general that will fight for the constitutional rights of all citizens." He suspended his campaign on March 10, 2022, and endorsed Rochelle Mercedes Garza as the Democratic candidate.

== Early life and education ==
Merritt was born on February 1, 1983 in South Central Los Angeles and as a child moved to north Florida.

Merritt graduated cum laude from Morehouse College in Atlanta, Georgia and attended Temple University’s James Beasley School of Law, graduating in 2012. While at Temple, Merritt participated in the trial advocacy program.

== Career ==
Following graduation from Morehouse College, Merritt taught in Camden, New Jersey through the Teach for America program.

After graduating from Temple University, Merritt began his career at The Cochran Firm in their Philadelphia office and at McEldrew Young.

Merritt founded the Merritt Law Firm, which represents victims of police brutality, official corruption, corporate discrimination, and hate crimes. Based in Philadelphia, the firm takes on civil rights cases nationwide.

=== Deandre Harris ===
On August 12, 2017, Deandre Harris was beaten in a parking garage by six men following a "Unite the Right" rally in Charlottesville, Virginia; Merritt served as Harris' attorney in the case.

=== Jordan Edwards ===
On April 29, 2017, Jordan Edwards, a 15-year-old African American male, was fatally shot in the back of the head by police officer Roy Oliver in Balch Springs, Texas, while riding in the passenger's seat of a vehicle leaving a house party. Merritt served as the Edwards' family attorney.

=== Marlin Gipson ===
Merritt represented 20-year-old Marlin Gipson after he was arrested then charged for failing to identify himself and resisting arrest. Gipson was distributing business cards for his lawn care service, but was misidentified as the suspect in a local string of burglaries.

=== Atatiana Jefferson ===
Atatiana Jefferson was fatally shot in her home by a police officer in Fort Worth, Texas, United States, in the early morning of October 12, 2019. Merritt served as the family's attorney in this case.

=== Ahmaud Arbery ===
Merritt is currently serving as the lawyer for the family of Ahmaud Arbery, who was jogging through Brunswick, Georgia, on February 23, 2020, and murdered by two white men who claimed Arbery looked like a suspect in a string of local burglaries. Alongside the lawyers for the families of George Floyd and Breonna Taylor, Merritt plans to bring the case to the United Nations.

== Activism ==
In 2017, Merritt appeared before the National Black Caucus of State Legislators 41st Annual Conference on a Town Hall panel to discuss mass incarceration. “Mass incarceration is a problem that must be addressed otherwise we become a part of the problem due to inaction,” said Merritt in the panel.

Following the murders of Ahmaud Arbery and George Floyd in 2020, Merritt made various television appearances alongside Arbery's mother to call attention to the broad issues of racial bias in policing and American society at large.

On March 20, 2021, Merritt announced on Twitter his proposal to run for Texas attorney general, saying "Texas deserves an attorney general that will fight for the constitutional rights of all citizens." He suspended his campaign on March 10, 2022, and endorsed Rochelle Garza as the Democratic Party candidate. Garza was defeated in the general election.

== Awards and recognition ==
In 2017, Merritt was No. 8 on The Root 100, a list honoring the top 10 most influential African Americans in the country ages 18 to 45. In his biography, Merritt is described as an "emerging as a new leader in the fight for racial justice, standing on the front lines of making sure people know that black lives matter."
