= Texas's 29th congressional district =

U.S. House district for Texas

Coordinates: 29°41′17″N 95°11′59″W

- Interactive map of district boundaries
- Representative: Sylvia Garcia; D–Houston
- Distribution: 99.94% urban; 0.06% rural
- Population (2025): 763,531
- Median household income: $60,490
- Ethnicity: 74.5% Hispanic; 13.2% Black; 8.3% White; 2.3% Asian; 1.1% Two or more races; 0.5% other
- Cook PVI: D+12

Texas's 29th congressional district of the United States House of Representatives covers the eastern portion of the Greater Houston area in the state of Texas. The current Representative from the 29th district is Democrat Sylvia Garcia.

The Texas State Legislature established the district as a majority-Hispanic or Latino district. Democrat Gene Green, a non-Hispanic white, won the first election for the district in 1992 and held it for 13 terms. In November 2017, Green announced that he would retire from Congress and would not run for re-election in 2018. Garcia won the election to succeed him.

== Composition ==
For the 118th and successive Congresses (based on redistricting following the 2020 census), the district contains all or portions of the following counties and communities:

Harris County (9)

Aldine, Channelview (part; also 2nd and 36th), Cloverleaf, Galena Park, Houston (part; also 2nd, 7th, 8th, 9th, 18th, 22nd, 36th, 38th; shared with Fort Bend and Montgomery counties), Humble (part; also 2nd and 18th), Jacinto City (part; also 18th and 36th), Pasadena (part; also 36th), South Houston

== Recent election results from statewide races ==
=== 2023–2027 boundaries ===
Year	Office	Results
2008	President	Obama 65% - 34%
2012	President	Obama 68% - 32%
2014	Senate	Alameel 64% - 36%
2014	Governor	Davis 66% - 34%
2016	President	Clinton 73% - 23%
2018	Senate	O'Rourke 76% - 24%
2018	Governor	Valdez 71% - 28%
2018	Lt. Governor	Collier 73% - 25%
2018	Attorney General	Nelson 74% - 24%
2018	Comptroller of Public Accounts	Chevalier 72% - 25%
2020	President	Biden 68% - 31%
2020	Senate	Hegar 66% - 31%
2022	Governor	O'Rourke 68% - 30%
2022	Lt. Governor	Collier 66% - 30%
2022	Attorney General	Mercedes Garza 68% - 30%
2022	Comptroller of Public Accounts	Dudding 64% - 31%
2024	President	Harris 60% - 39%
2024	Senate	Allred 64% - 33%

=== 2027–2033 boundaries ===
Year	Office	Results
2008	President	Obama 67% - 32%
2012	President	Obama 69% - 31%
2014	Senate	Alameel 64% - 36%
2014	Governor	Davis 67% - 33%
2016	President	Clinton 72% - 24%
2018	Senate	O'Rourke 75% - 24%
2018	Governor	Valdez 70% - 29%
2018	Lt. Governor	Collier 73% - 25%
2018	Attorney General	Nelson 74% - 24%
2018	Comptroller of Public Accounts	Chevalier 72% - 26%
2020	President	Biden 71% - 28%
2020	Senate	Hegar 68% - 29%
2022	Governor	O'Rourke 70% - 28%
2022	Lt. Governor	Collier 69% - 28%
2022	Attorney General	Mercedes Garza 69% - 28%
2022	Comptroller of Public Accounts	Dudding 67% - 30%
2024	President	Harris 65% - 34%
2024	Senate	Allred 68% - 29%
2026	Senate	Talarico 79% - 19%
2026	Governor	Hinojosa 78% - 20%

== List of members representing the district ==
Representative (Residency)	Party	Years	Cong ress	Electoral history	District location
District established January 3, 1993
Gene Green (Houston)	Democratic	January 3, 1993 – January 3, 2019	103rd 104th 105th 106th 107th 108th 109th 110th 111th 112th 113th 114th 115th	Elected in 1992. Re-elected in 1994. Re-elected in 1996. Re-elected in 1998. Re-elected in 2000. Re-elected in 2002. Re-elected in 2004. Re-elected in 2006. Re-elected in 2008. Re-elected in 2010. Re-elected in 2012. Re-elected in 2014. Re-elected in 2016. Retired.	1993–1997 [data missing]
Gene Green (Houston)	Democratic	January 3, 1993 – January 3, 2019	103rd 104th 105th 106th 107th 108th 109th 110th 111th 112th 113th 114th 115th	Elected in 1992. Re-elected in 1994. Re-elected in 1996. Re-elected in 1998. Re-elected in 2000. Re-elected in 2002. Re-elected in 2004. Re-elected in 2006. Re-elected in 2008. Re-elected in 2010. Re-elected in 2012. Re-elected in 2014. Re-elected in 2016. Retired.	1997–2003; Parts of Harris
Gene Green (Houston)	Democratic	January 3, 1993 – January 3, 2019	103rd 104th 105th 106th 107th 108th 109th 110th 111th 112th 113th 114th 115th	Elected in 1992. Re-elected in 1994. Re-elected in 1996. Re-elected in 1998. Re-elected in 2000. Re-elected in 2002. Re-elected in 2004. Re-elected in 2006. Re-elected in 2008. Re-elected in 2010. Re-elected in 2012. Re-elected in 2014. Re-elected in 2016. Retired.	2003–2005; Parts of Harris
Gene Green (Houston)	Democratic	January 3, 1993 – January 3, 2019	103rd 104th 105th 106th 107th 108th 109th 110th 111th 112th 113th 114th 115th	Elected in 1992. Re-elected in 1994. Re-elected in 1996. Re-elected in 1998. Re-elected in 2000. Re-elected in 2002. Re-elected in 2004. Re-elected in 2006. Re-elected in 2008. Re-elected in 2010. Re-elected in 2012. Re-elected in 2014. Re-elected in 2016. Retired.	2005–2013 Parts of Harris
Gene Green (Houston)	Democratic	January 3, 1993 – January 3, 2019	103rd 104th 105th 106th 107th 108th 109th 110th 111th 112th 113th 114th 115th	Elected in 1992. Re-elected in 1994. Re-elected in 1996. Re-elected in 1998. Re-elected in 2000. Re-elected in 2002. Re-elected in 2004. Re-elected in 2006. Re-elected in 2008. Re-elected in 2010. Re-elected in 2012. Re-elected in 2014. Re-elected in 2016. Retired.	2013–2023 Parts of Harris
Sylvia Garcia (Houston)	Democratic	January 3, 2019 – present	116th 117th 118th 119th	Elected in 2018. Re-elected in 2020. Re-elected in 2022. Re-elected in 2024. Re-elected in 2026.	2013–2023 Parts of Harris
Sylvia Garcia (Houston)	Democratic	January 3, 2019 – present	116th 117th 118th 119th	Elected in 2018. Re-elected in 2020. Re-elected in 2022. Re-elected in 2024. Re-elected in 2026.	2023–present Parts of Harris

== Election results ==
U.S. House election, 2004: Texas District 29
Party	Candidate	Votes	%	±%
Democratic Party (U.S.)	Gene Green (incumbent)	78,256	94.1	−1.0
Libertarian Party (U.S.)	Clifford Messina	4,868	5.9	+1.0
Majority		73,388	88.3	
Turnout		83,124		
Democratic Party (U.S.) hold		Swing	-1.0	

U.S. House election, 2006: Texas District 29
Party	Candidate	Votes	%	±%
Democratic Party (U.S.)	Gene Green (incumbent)	37,174	74%	−20,1%
Republican Party (U.S.)	Eric Story	12,347	24%	+24%
Majority		24,827	50%	
Turnout		49,521		
Democratic Party (U.S.) hold		Swing		

U.S. House election, 2008: Texas District 29
Party	Candidate	Votes	%	±%
Democratic Party (U.S.)	Gene Green (incumbent)	79,718	75%	+10.4
Republican Party (U.S.)	Eric Story	25,512	24%	−10.1%
Majority		54,206	51%	
Turnout		105,230		
Democratic Party (U.S.) hold		Swing	-1.0	

U.S. House election, 2010: Texas District 29
Party	Candidate	Votes	%	±%
Democratic Party (U.S.)	Gene Green (incumbent)	43,185	64.6%	−10.4%
Republican Party (U.S.)	Roy Morales	22,756	34.1%	+10.1%
Majority		20,399	30.5%	
Turnout		65,941		
Democratic Party (U.S.) hold		Swing		

U.S. House election, 2012: Texas District 29
Party	Candidate	Votes	%
Democratic	Gene Green (incumbent)	86,053	90.00
Libertarian	James Stanczak	4,996	5.23
Green	Maria Selva	4,562	4.77
Total votes		95,611	100.0

U.S. House election, 2014: Texas District 29
Party	Candidate	Votes	%
Democratic	Gene Green (incumbent)	41,321	79.6
Libertarian	James Stanczak	4,822	10.4
Total votes		46,143	100.0
Democratic hold			

U.S. House election, 2016: Texas District 29
Party	Candidate	Votes	%
Democratic	Gene Green (incumbent)	95,649	72.5
Republican	Julio Garza	31,646	24.0
Libertarian	N. Ruben Perez	3,234	2.4
Green	James Partsch-Galvan	1,453	1.1
Total votes		131,982	100.0
Democratic hold			

U.S. House election, 2018: Texas District 29
Party	Candidate	Votes	%
Democratic	Sylvia Garcia	88,188	75.1
Republican	Phillip Aronoff	28,098	23.9
Libertarian	Cullen Burns	1,199	1.0
Independent	Johnathan Garza (write-in)	9	0.0
Total votes		117,494	100
Democratic hold			

U.S. House election, 2020: Texas District 29
Party	Candidate	Votes	%
Democratic	Sylvia Garcia (incumbent)	111,305	71.1
Republican	Jaimy Z. Blanco	42,840	27.4
Libertarian	Phil Kurtz	2,328	1.5
Total votes		156,473	100.0
Democratic hold			

U.S. House election, 2022: Texas District 29
Party	Candidate	Votes	%
Democratic	Sylvia Garcia (incumbent)	71,837	71.4
Republican	Robert Schafranek	28,765	28.5
Total votes		100,602	100.0
Democratic hold			

=== 2024 ===
U.S. House election, 2024: Texas District 29
Party	Candidate	Votes	%
Democratic	Sylvia Garcia (incumbent)	98,842	65.2
Republican	Alan Garza	52,689	34.8
Total votes		151,531	100.0
Democratic hold			

== Historical district boundaries ==
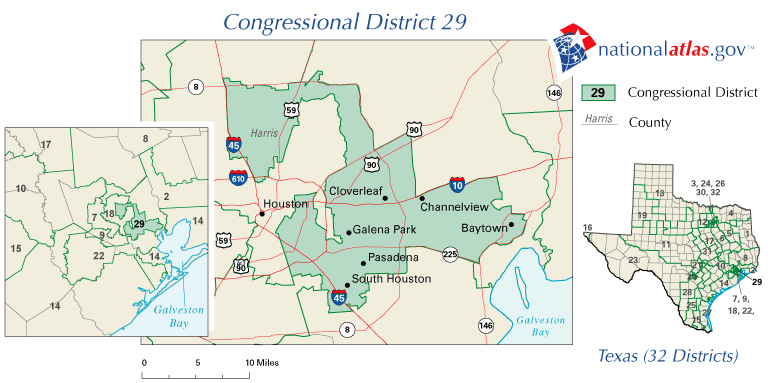
2007–2013

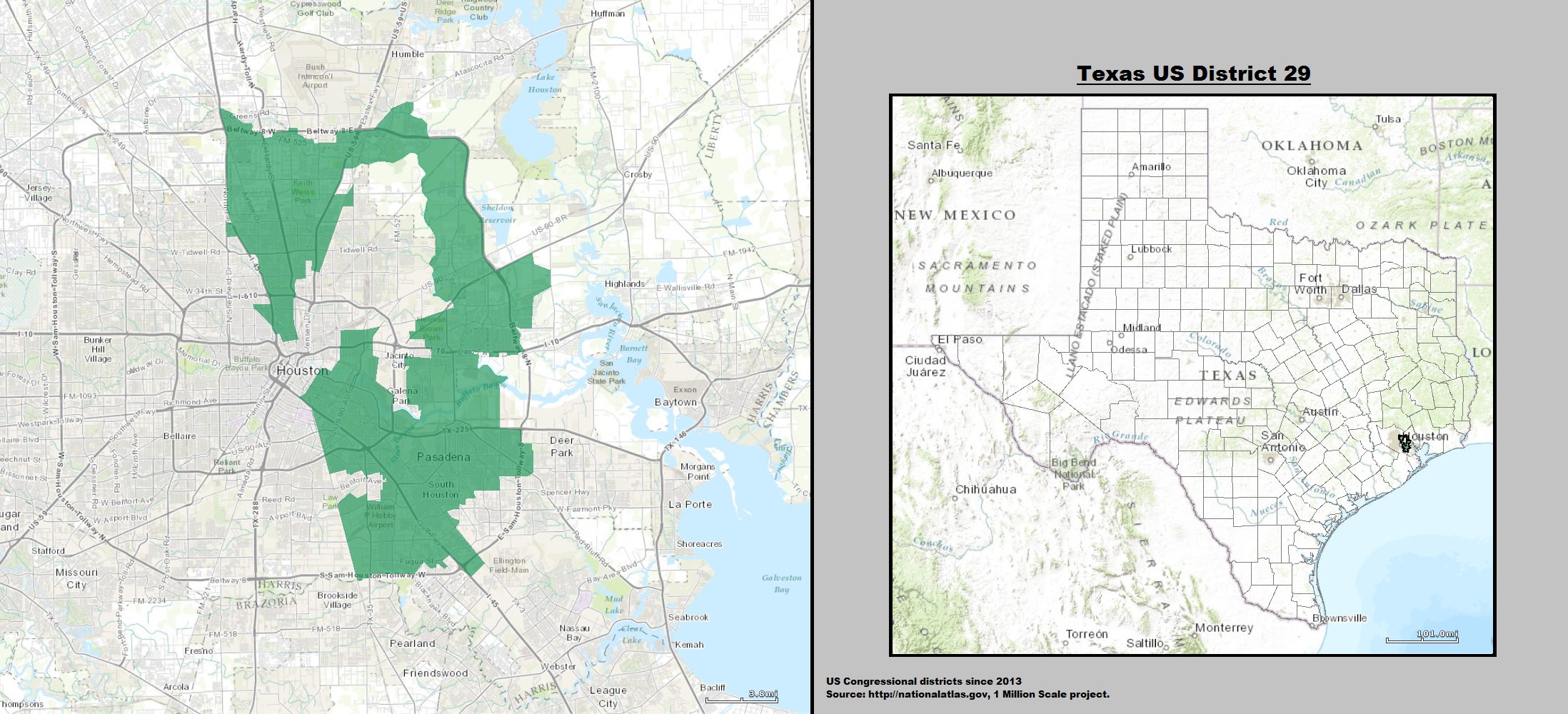
2013–2023

== See also ==
- List of United States congressional districts
