= 2018 Texas lieutenant gubernatorial election =

American state election

- November 6, 2018
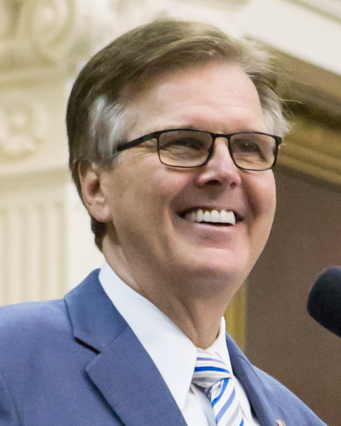

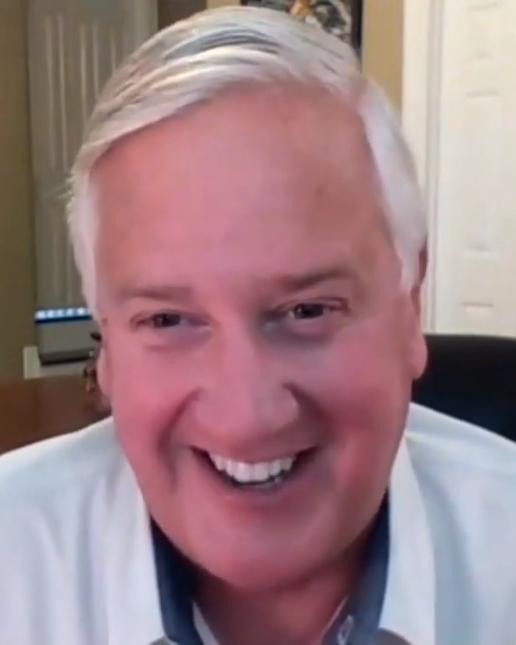
Nominee	Dan Patrick	Mike Collier
Party	Republican	Democratic
Popular vote	4,260,990	3,860,865
Percentage	51.3%	46.5%
- Patrick: 40–50% 50–60% 60–70% 70–80% 80–90% >90% Collier: 40–50% 50–60% 60–70% 70–80% 80–90% >90% Tie: 40–50% 50% No data
Lieutenant Governor before election
Dan Patrick
Republican
Elected Lieutenant Governor
Dan Patrick
Republican

The 2018 Texas lieutenant gubernatorial election was held on November 6, 2018, to elect the lieutenant governor of the state of Texas. The election coincided with various other federal and state elections, including for governor of Texas. Primary elections were held on March 6, 2018. Texas is one of 21 states that elects its lieutenant governor separately from its governor.

On January 9, 2017, the day before the 85th Texas Legislature began its session, incumbent Republican lieutenant governor Dan Patrick announced he would run for re-election in 2018. He stated his early announcement was in order to dispel rumors of a primary challenge to Governor Greg Abbott or U.S. Senator Ted Cruz.

Patrick was re-elected to a second term, defeating Democratic nominee Mike Collier.

== Republican primary ==
=== Candidates ===
- Scott Milder, former Rockwall city councilman
- Dan Patrick, incumbent lieutenant governor

=== Results ===
Republican primary results
Party	Candidate	Votes	%
Republican	Dan Patrick (incumbent)	1,172,830	76.07%
Republican	Scott Milder	368,995	23.93%
Total votes		1,541,825	100.0%

== Democratic primary ==
=== Candidates ===
- Mike Collier, businessman, finance Chair of the Texas Democratic Party, and nominee for Texas Comptroller in 2014
- Michael Cooper, businessman, community leader, and pastor

=== Results ===
Democratic primary results
Party	Candidate	Votes	%
Democratic	Mike Collier	504,220	52.38%
Democratic	Michael Cooper	458,404	47.62%
Total votes		962,624	100.0%

== Libertarian state convention ==
=== Candidates ===
- Kerry Douglas McKennon

== General election ==
=== Polling ===
View source data.

Poll source	Date(s) administered	Sample size	Margin of error	Dan Patrick (R)	Mike Collier (D)	Kerry McKennon (L)	Other	Undecided
Dixie Strategies	September 6–7, 2018	519	± 4.3%	45%	39%	2%	–	14%
Texas Lyceum	July 9–26, 2018	441	± 4.7%	39%	29%	4%	–	28%
Gravis Marketing	July 3–7, 2018	602	± 4.0%	46%	44%	–	–	10%
UoT/Texas Tribune	June 8–17, 2018	1,200	± 2.8%	37%	31%	4%	5%	23%

=== Results ===
2018 Texas lieutenant gubernatorial election
Party	Candidate	Votes	%	±%
Republican	Dan Patrick (incumbent)	4,260,990	51.30%	−6.84%
Democratic	Mike Collier	3,860,865	46.49%	+7.78%
Libertarian	Kerry Douglas McKennon	183,516	2.21%	−0.35%
Total votes		8,305,371	100.0%	
Republican hold				

==== By congressional district ====
Patrick won 22 of 36 congressional districts, with the remaining 14 going to Collier, including one that elected a Republican.

District	Patrick	Collier	Representative
1st	69%	29%	Louie Gohmert
2nd	51%	47%	Ted Poe
2nd	51%	47%	Dan Crenshaw
3rd	53%	45%	Sam Johnson
3rd	53%	45%	Van Taylor
4th	72%	26%	John Ratcliffe
5th	60%	38%	Jeb Hensarling
5th	60%	38%	Lance Gooden
6th	52%	46%	Joe Barton
6th	52%	46%	Ron Wright
7th	47%	51%	John Culberson
7th	47%	51%	Lizzie Fletcher
8th	70%	28%	Kevin Brady
9th	20%	79%	Al Green
10th	50%	48%	Michael McCaul
11th	75%	22%	Mike Conaway
12th	61%	37%	Kay Granger
13th	76%	22%	Mac Thornberry
14th	58%	40%	Randy Weber
15th	42%	56%	Vicente Gonzalez
16th	29%	67%	Beto O'Rourke
16th	29%	67%	Veronica Escobar
17th	54%	44%	Bill Flores
18th	22%	77%	Sheila Jackson Lee
19th	68%	29%	Jodey Arrington
20th	35%	62%	Joaquín Castro
21st	51%	47%	Lamar Smith
21st	51%	47%	Chip Roy
22nd	51%	47%	Pete Olson
23rd	48%	49%	Will Hurd
24th	49%	48%	Kenny Marchant
25th	52%	45%	Roger Williams
26th	58%	40%	Michael Burgess
27th	60%	38%	Michael Cloud
28th	41%	57%	Henry Cuellar
29th	27%	71%	Gene Green
29th	27%	71%	Sylvia Garcia
30th	19%	79%	Eddie Bernice Johnson
31st	52%	45%	John Carter
32nd	46%	52%	Pete Sessions
32nd	46%	52%	Colin Allred
33rd	23%	75%	Marc Veasey
34th	42%	56%	Filemon Vela Jr.
35th	29%	68%	Lloyd Doggett
36th	70%	28%	Brian Babin
