= 1972 United States House of Representatives elections in Texas =

- November 7, 1972

All 24 Texas seats to the United States House of Representatives
	Majority party	Minority party
Party	Democratic	Republican
Last election	20	3
Seats won	20	4
Seat change	Steady	▲1
Popular vote	2,032,183	835,185
Percentage	70.4%	28.9%
Swing	▼2.6%	▲2.9%
Democratic
50–60%
60–70%
70–80%
80–90%
90>%
Republican
50–60%
70–80%
80–90%

The 1972 United States House of Representatives elections in Texas occurred on November 7, 1972, to elect the members of the state of Texas's delegation to the United States House of Representatives. Texas had twenty-four seats in the House, up one from the 1960s, apportioned according to the 1970 United States census.

Texas Democrats maintained their governmental trifecta after the 1970 elections. This gave the Democrats full control over the redistricting process. The Texas Legislature enacted its redistricting plan in 1971. Residents of the 6th, 13th, 16th, and 19th congressional districts challenged the constitutionality of the maps in White v. Weiser, but the Supreme Court stayed the case until after the 1972 elections.

These elections occurred simultaneously with the United States Senate elections of 1972, the United States House elections in other states, the presidential election, and various state and local elections.

Democrats maintained their majority of U.S. House seats from Texas, but Republicans gained one seat, putting their majority at twenty out of twenty-four seats. This cycle saw the election of Barbara Jordan, the first African American woman elected to the House from Texas.

== Overview ==
1972 United States House of Representatives elections in Texas
Party	Votes	Percentage	Seats before	Seats after	+/–
Democratic	2,032,183	70.42%	20	20	-
Republican	835,185	28.94%	3	4	+1
Socialist Workers	17,412	0.60%	0	0	-
American Independent	1,169	0.04%	0	0	-
Totals	2,885,949	100.00%	23	24	+1

== Congressional districts ==
District	Incumbent	Party	First elected	Result	Candidates
Texas 1	Wright Patman	Democratic	1928	Incumbent re-elected.	√ Wright Patman (Democratic) Unopposed
Texas 2	John Dowdy	Democratic	1952	Incumbent retired. New member elected. Democratic hold.	√ Charles Wilson (Democratic) 73.8% Charles O. Brightwell (Republican) 26.2%
Texas 3	James M. Collins	Republican	1968	Incumbent re-elected.	√ James M. Collins (Republican) 73.3% George A. Hughes Jr. (Democratic) 26.7%
Texas 4	Ray Roberts	Democratic	1962	Incumbent re-elected.	√ Ray Roberts (Democratic) 70.2% James Russell (Republican) 29.8%
Texas 5	Earle Cabell	Democratic	1964	Incumbent lost re-election. New member elected. Republican gain.	√ Alan Steelman (Republican) 55.7% Earle Cabell (Democratic) 44.3%
Texas 6	Olin E. Teague	Democratic	1946	Incumbent re-elected.	√ Olin E. Teague (Democratic) 72.6% Carl Nigliazzo (Republican) 27.4%
Texas 7	William Reynolds Archer Jr.	Republican	1970	Incumbent re-elected.	√ William Reynolds Archer Jr. (Republican) 82.3% Jim Brady (Democratic) 17.7%
Texas 8	Robert C. Eckhardt	Democratic	1966	Incumbent re-elected.	√ Robert C. Eckhardt (Democratic) 64.6% Lewis Emerich (Republican) 34.7% Susan Ellis (Socialist Workers) 0.7%
Texas 9	Jack Brooks	Democratic	1952	Incumbent re-elected.	√ Jack Brooks (Democratic) 66.2% Randolph C. Reed (Democratic) 33.8%
Texas 10	J. J. Pickle	Democratic	1963	Incumbent re-elected.	√ J. J. Pickle (Democratic) 91.2% Mellissa Singler (Socialist Workers) 8.8%
Texas 11	William R. Poage	Democratic	1936	Incumbent re-elected.	√ William R. Poage (Democratic) Unopposed
Texas 12	Jim Wright	Democratic	1954	Incumbent re-elected.	√ Jim Wright (Democratic) Unopposed
Texas 13	Bob Price; Redistricted from the 18th district	Republican	1966	Incumbent re-elected.	√ Bob Price (Republican) 54.8% Graham B. Purcell Jr. (Democratic) 45.2%
Texas 13	Graham B. Purcell Jr.	Democratic	1962	Incumbent lost re-election. Democratic loss.	√ Bob Price (Republican) 54.8% Graham B. Purcell Jr. (Democratic) 45.2%
Texas 14	John Andrew Young	Democratic	1956	Incumbent re-elected.	√ John Andrew Young (Democratic) Unopposed
Texas 15	Kika de la Garza	Democratic	1964	Incumbent re-elected.	√ Kika de la Garza (Democratic) Unopposed
Texas 16	Richard C. White	Democratic	1964	Incumbent re-elected.	√ Richard C. White (Democratic) Unopposed
Texas 17	Omar Burleson	Democratic	1946	Incumbent re-elected.	√ Omar Burleson (Democratic) Unopposed
Texas 18	None (district created)			New seat. New member elected. Democratic gain.	√ Barbara Jordan (Democratic) 80.6% Paul Merritt (Republican) 18.2% Emmanuel Barrera (Socialist Workers) 1.2%
Texas 19	George H. Mahon	Democratic	1934	Incumbent re-elected.	√ George H. Mahon (Democratic) Unopposed
Texas 20	Henry B. Gonzalez	Democratic	1961	Incumbent re-elected.	√ Henry B. Gonzalez (Democratic) 96.9% Steve Wattenmaker (Socialist Workers) 3.1%
Texas 21	O. C. Fisher	Democratic	1942	Incumbent re-elected.	√ O. C. Fisher (Democratic) 56.8% Doug Harlan (Republican) 43.2%
Texas 22	Robert R. Casey	Democratic	1958	Incumbent re-elected.	√ Robert R. Casey (Democratic) 70.2% Jim Griffin (Republican) 29.0% Frank Peto (Independent) 0.8%
Texas 23	Abraham Kazen	Democratic	1966	Incumbent re-elected.	√ Abraham Kazen (Democratic) Unopposed
Texas 24	None (district created)			New seat. New member elected. Democratic gain.	√ Dale Milford (Democratic) 65.1% Courtney G. Roberts (Republican) 34.9%

== See also ==
- List of United States representatives from Texas
- United States House of Representatives elections, 1972
