= 2022 Texas Attorney General election =

- November 8, 2022
- Turnout: 36.6% (▼5.0%)
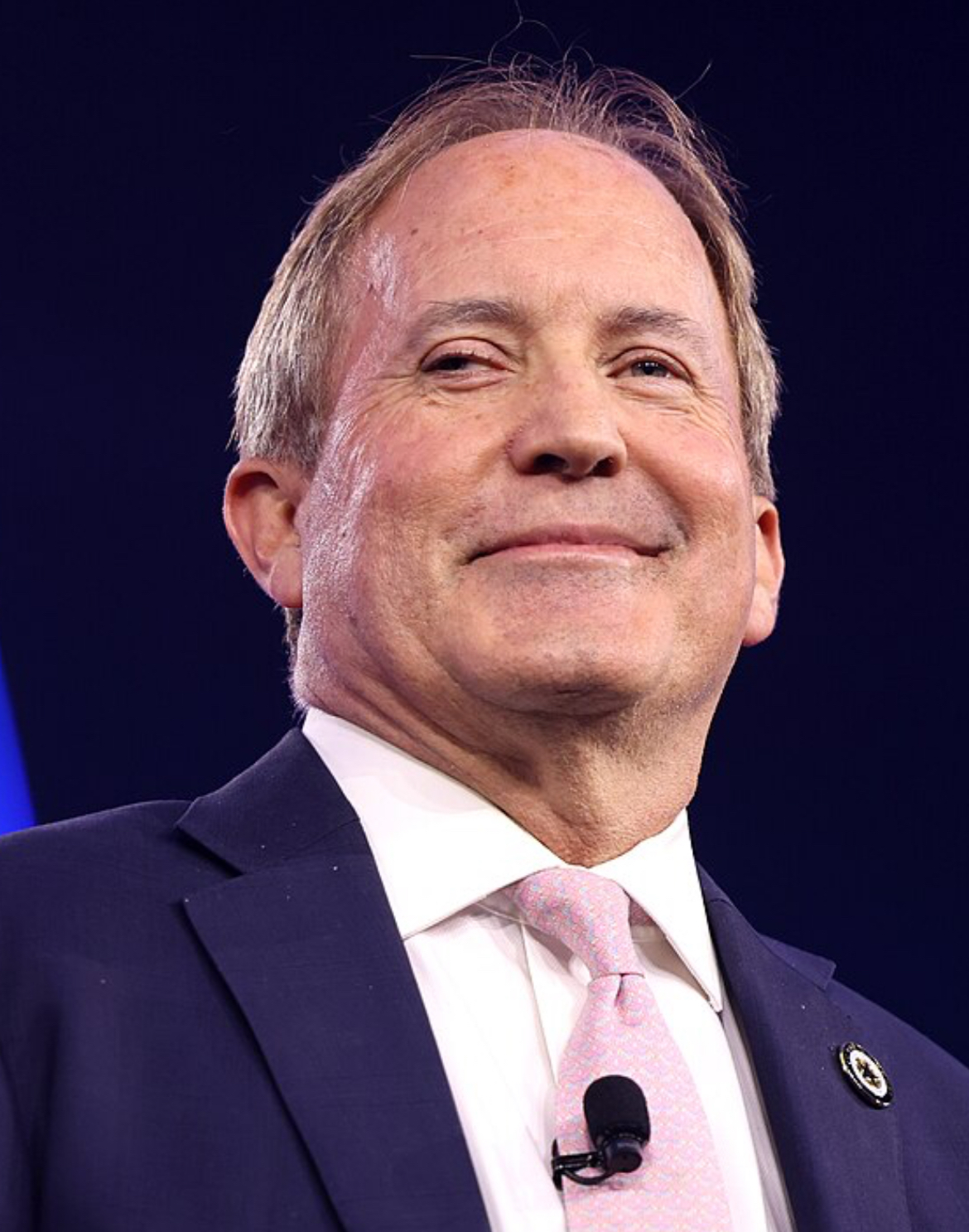

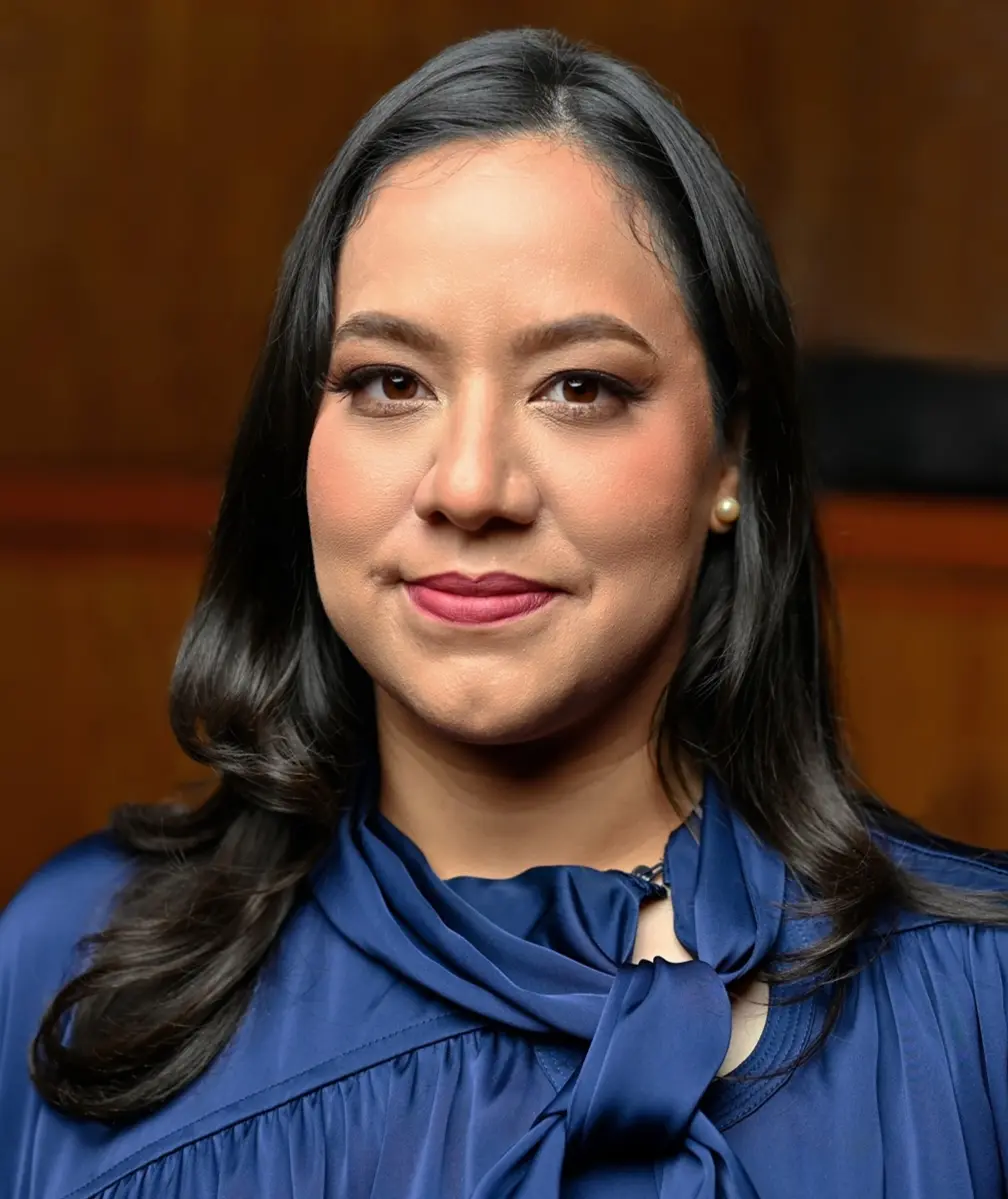
Nominee	Ken Paxton	Rochelle Mercedes Garza
Party	Republican	Democratic
Popular vote	4,278,986	3,497,267
Percentage	53.42%	43.66%
- Paxton: 40–50% 50–60% 60–70% 70–80% 80–90% >90% Garza: 40–50% 50–60% 60–70% 70–80% 80–90% >90% Tie: 40–50% 50% No data
Attorney General before election
Ken Paxton
Republican
Elected Attorney General
Ken Paxton
Republican

The 2022 Texas Attorney General election took place on November 8, 2022, to elect the Attorney General of Texas. Incumbent Republican Attorney General Ken Paxton won re-election to his third term. Paxton won 233 counties and won the popular vote by a margin of 9.7%, underperforming Governor Greg Abbott's concurrent bid for re-election by 1.1%.

== Republican primary ==
=== Candidates ===
==== Nominee ====
- Ken Paxton, incumbent attorney general

==== Eliminated in runoff ====
- George P. Bush, commissioner of the Texas General Land Office

==== Eliminated in primary ====
- Louie Gohmert, U.S. representative for Texas's 1st congressional district (declined to endorse in runoff)
- Eva Guzman, former associate justice of the Supreme Court of Texas (2009–2021)

==== Withdrawn ====
- Matt Krause, state representative from the 93rd district (running for Tarrant County district attorney; endorsed Gohmert)

=== Endorsements ===
George P. Bush

U.S. executive branch officials

- James Baker, former White House Chief of Staff (1981–1985, 1992–1993), former U.S. Secretary of State (1989–1992) and former U.S. Secretary of the Treasury (1985–1988)

State senators

- Jon Bramnick, New Jersey state senator (2022–present) and former state assemblyman (2003–2022) from the 21st district

Local officials

- Otto Hanak, Washington County sheriff (2013–present)
- Jeffrey Lyde, Clay County sheriff
- Anthony Williams, mayor of Abilene (2017–present)

Newspapers

- Fort Worth Star-Telegram (dual endorsement with Garza)
- San Antonio Express-News (dual endorsement with Garza)

Organizations

- National Border Patrol Council

Individuals

- Mattress Mack, businessman
Ken Paxton

U.S. executive branch officials

- Donald Trump, 45th president of the United States (2017–2021)

Organizations

- American Conservative Union
- Texas Alliance for Life
Eva Guzman

Newspapers and other media

- Austin American-Statesman (Republican primary only)
- The Houston Chronicle (Republican primary only)

Organizations

- Texans for Lawsuit Reform
Louie Gohmert

State representatives

- Matt Krause, state representative from the 93rd district (2013–present) and withdrawn candidate

=== First round ===
==== Polling ====
===== Graphical summary =====
Poll source	Date(s) administered	Sample size (Note: Key: A – all adults RV – registered voters LV – likely voters V – unclear)	Margin of error	George P. Bush	Louie Gohmert	Eva Guzman	Matt Krause	Ken Paxton	Other	Undecided
Emerson College	February 21–22, 2022	522 (LV)	± 4.2%	20%	12%	12%	–	43%	–	14%
UT Tyler	February 8–15, 2022	577 (LV)	± 4.4%	25%	7%	13%	–	39%	–	16%
YouGov/UT	January 28 – February 7, 2022	375 (LV)	± 5.1%	21%	15%	16%	–	47%	1%	–
UT Tyler	January 18–25, 2022	503 (LV)	± 5.1%	19%	8%	7%	–	33%	–	33%
YouGov/UH	January 14–24, 2022	490 (LV)	± 3.7%	16%	13%	8%	–	39%	–	24%
	November 23, 2021	Krause withdraws from the race								
UT Tyler	November 9–16, 2021	401 (LV)	± 5.3%	32%	–	7%	–	46%	7%	8%
YouGov/UT/TT	October 22–31, 2021	554 (RV)	± 4.2%	16%	–	2%	3%	48%	3%	27%
YouGov/TXHPF	October 14–27, 2021	405 (LV)	± 4.9%	17%	–	6%	2%	50%	–	25%
UT Tyler	September 7–14, 2021	348 (LV)	± 6.7%	28%	–	5%	–	43%	14%	10%
UT Tyler	June 20–29, 2021	337 (LV)	± 6.1%	34%	–	4%	–	42%	12%	8%

==== Results ====
Primary results map by county: Paxton: 30–40% 40–50% 50–60% 60–70%; Bush: 30–40% 40–50% 50–60%; Gohmert: 30–40% 40–50% 50–60% 60–70%

Gohmert performed best in Texas's 1st congressional district, where he served as a U.S. representative at the time; Guzman performed best in urban Travis, Harris, and Dallas counties; Bush performed best in the Rio Grande Valley; and Paxton performed best in the Texas Panhandle, South Plains, and Southeast Texas.

Republican primary results
Party	Candidate	Votes	%
Republican	Ken Paxton (incumbent)	823,199	42.71%
Republican	George P. Bush	439,240	22.79%
Republican	Eva Guzman	337,761	17.52%
Republican	Louie Gohmert	327,257	16.98%
Total votes		1,927,457	100.00%

=== Runoff ===
==== Polling ====
Poll source	Date(s) administered	Sample size	Margin of error	George P. Bush	Ken Paxton	Undecided
UT Tyler	May 2–10, 2022	570 (LV)	± 4.6%	35%	41%	24%
CWS Research (R) (Note: Poll sponsored by Defend Texas Liberty PAC, which supports Paxton)	May 4–10, 2022	992 (LV)	± 3.1%	31%	58%	11%
CWS Research (R)	March 29 – April 2, 2022	678 (LV)	± 3.8%	30%	59%	11%
YouGov/TXHPF	March 18–28, 2022	438 (LV)	± 4.7%	23%	65%	12%

==== Results ====
Primary runoff results map by county: Paxton: 50–60% 60–70% 70–80% 80–90% 90–100%; Bush: 50–60% 70–80% 80–90%

Republican primary runoff results
Party	Candidate	Votes	%
Republican	Ken Paxton (incumbent)	633,223	67.96%
Republican	George P. Bush	298,577	32.04%
Total votes		931,800	100.00%

== Democratic primary ==
=== Candidates ===
==== Nominee ====
- Rochelle Mercedes Garza, former attorney for the American Civil Liberties Union

==== Eliminated in runoff ====
- Joe Jaworski, attorney, mediator, former mayor of Galveston, and grandson of former U.S. Department of Justice special counsel Leon Jaworski

==== Eliminated in primary ====
- Mike Fields, attorney and former judge of the Harris County Criminal Court at Law No. 14 (endorsed Garza in runoff)
- Lee Merritt, civil rights attorney (endorsed Garza in runoff)
- S. T-Bone Raynor, attorney

=== Endorsements ===
Joe Jaworski

Labor unions

- Texas AFL–CIO

Newspapers and other media

- The Austin Chronicle (dual endorsement with Garza)
- The Dallas Morning News
- The Houston Chronicle (Democratic primary only)

Organizations

- Stonewall Democrats of Dallas
Lee Merritt

U.S. senators

- Bernie Sanders, U.S. senator from Vermont

U.S. representatives

- Sheila Jackson Lee, U.S. representative for Texas's 18th congressional district

State senators

- Royce West, state senator from the 23rd district

Local officials

- Sylvester Turner, mayor of Houston and former Texas state representative from the 139th district

Organizations

- Texas Organizing Project (endorsed Garza in the runoff)
Rochelle Mercedes Garza

U.S. representatives

- Vicente González, U.S. representative for Texas's 15th congressional district
- Filemón Vela, U.S. representative for Texas's 34th congressional district

Local officials

- Mike Fields, former judge of the Harris County Criminal Court at Law No. 14 and former attorney general candidate

Newspapers and other media

- Austin American-Statesman (Democratic primary only)
- The Austin Chronicle (dual endorsement with Jaworski)
- Fort Worth Star-Telegram (dual endorsement with Bush)
- San Antonio Express-News (dual endorsement with Bush)

Individuals

- Lee Merritt, civil rights attorney and former attorney general candidate

Labor unions

- Texas AFL–CIO
- Texas Federation of Teachers

Organizations

- Annie's List
- EMILY's List
- End Citizens United
- Equality Texas
- Latino Victory Fund
- NARAL Pro-Choice America
- Planned Parenthood Texas Votes
- Texas College Democrats
- Texas Organizing Project

=== First round ===
==== Polling ====
===== Graphical summary =====
Poll source	Date(s) administered	Sample size	Margin of error	Mike Fields	Rochelle Garza	Joe Jaworski	Lee Merritt	S. T-Bone Raynor	Other	Undecided
Emerson College	February 21–22, 2022	388 (LV)	± 4.9%	5%	30%	22%	16%	5%	–	22%
UT Tyler	February 8–15, 2022	479 (LV)	± 4.9%	9%	22%	13%	9%	6%	–	42%
YouGov/UT	January 28 – February 7, 2022	332 (LV)	± 5.4%	11%	41%	24%	15%	6%	3%	–
UT Tyler	January 18–25, 2022	460 (LV)	± 5.4%	7%	11%	11%	6%	4%	–	61%
YouGov/UH	January 14–24, 2022	616 (LV)	± 3.3%	6%	13%	10%	7%	6%	–	57%
YouGov/UT/TT	October 22–31, 2021	436 (RV)	± 4.7%	–	–	14%	8%	–	6%	72%
YouGov/TXHPF	October 14–27, 2021	– (LV)	–	–	–	20%	20%	–	–	60%

==== Results ====
Democratic primary results
Party	Candidate	Votes	%
Democratic	Rochelle Mercedes Garza	438,134	42.97%
Democratic	Joe Jaworski	202,140	19.82%
Democratic	Lee Merritt	198,108	19.43%
Democratic	Mike Fields	125,373	12.30%
Democratic	S. T-Bone Raynor	55,944	5.49%
Total votes		1,019,699	100.00%

=== Runoff ===
==== Polling ====
Poll source	Date(s) administered	Sample size	Margin of error	Rochelle Garza	Joe Jaworski	Undecided
UT Tyler	May 2–10, 2022	501 (LV)	± 4.9%	35%	20%	46%
YouGov/TXHPF	March 18–28, 2022	435 (LV)	± 4.7%	46%	31%	23%

==== Results ====
Democratic primary runoff results
Party	Candidate	Votes	%
Democratic	Rochelle Mercedes Garza	305,168	62.67%
Democratic	Joe Jaworski	181,744	37.33%
Total votes		486,912	100.00%

== Libertarian convention ==
=== Declared ===
- Mark Ash, attorney and candidate for chief justice of the Supreme Court of Texas in 2020

== General election ==
On October 27, 2022, Libertarian nominee Mark Ash published an op-ed in The Amarillo Pioneer in which he blasted Ken Paxton as "the poster child for corruption and authoritarianism" and recommended that if voters were "reluctant to throw away their votes on a third-party candidate," they should vote for Democratic nominee Rochelle Garza instead. The Texas Democratic Party put out a statement claiming that Ash had endorsed Garza, but Ash clarified that he was not endorsing her, nor would he be dropping out of the race.

=== Predictions ===
Source	Ranking	As of
Sabato's Crystal Ball	Leans R	November 3, 2022
Elections Daily	Likely R	November 1, 2022

=== Polling ===
Graphical summary

Poll source	Date(s) administered	Sample size	Margin of error	Ken Paxton (R)	Rochelle Garza (D)	Mark Ash (L)	Other	Undecided
CWS Research (R)	November 2–5, 2022	786 (LV)	± 3.5%	44%	38%	5%	–	12%
UT Tyler	October 17–24, 2022	1,330 (RV)	± 2.9%	39%	35%	5%	4% (Note: "Someone else" with 4%)	18%
UT Tyler	October 17–24, 2022	973 (LV)	± 3.4%	42%	38%	4%	3% (Note: "Someone else" with 3%)	12%
Emerson College	October 17–19, 2022	1,000 (LV)	± 3.0%	47%	42%	4%	–	8%
Siena College	October 16–19, 2022	649 (LV)	± 5.1%	48%	42%	–	2% (Note: "Another candidate" with 1%; "Not going to vote" with 1%)	8%
ActiVote	June 23 – September 21, 2022	209 (LV)	± 7.0%	45%	43%	12%	–	–
Siena College	September 14–18, 2022	651 (LV)	± 4.4%	47%	42%	–	–	11%
Texas Hispanic Policy Foundation	September 6–15, 2022	1,172 (LV)	± 2.9%	47%	42%	3%	–	8%
UT Tyler	September 7–13, 2022	1,243 (RV)	± 2.9%	37%	30%	6%	6% (Note: "Someone else" with 6%)	20%
YouGov/UT	August 26 – September 6, 2022	1,200 (RV)	± 2.8%	38%	33%	4%	5% (Note: "Someone else" with 5%)	21%
YouGov/UH/TSU	August 11–29, 2022	1,312 (LV)	± 2.7%	45%	42%	3%	–	10%
UT Tyler	August 1–7, 2022	1,384 (RV)	± 2.8%	34%	32%	8%	7%	18%
UT Tyler	August 1–7, 2022	1,199 (LV)	± 3.0%	36%	34%	8%	6%	16%
YouGov/UH	June 27 – July 7, 2022	1,169 (RV)	± 2.9%	43%	40%	5%	–	12%
YouGov/UH	June 27 – July 7, 2022	1,006 (LV)	± 3.1%	46%	41%	4%	–	9%
YouGov/UT	June 16–24, 2022	1,200 (RV)	± 2.8%	37%	29%	5%	5%	24%
YouGov/TXHPF	March 18–28, 2022	1,139 (LV)	± 2.6%	48%	42%	3%	–	7%

Hypothetical polling

George P. Bush vs. Rochelle Garza

Poll source	Date(s) administered	Sample size	Margin of error	George P. Bush (R)	Rochelle Garza (D)	Mark Ash (L)	Undecided
YouGov/TXHPF	March 18–28, 2022	1,139 (LV)	± 2.6%	39%	39%	7%	15%

George P. Bush vs. Joe Jaworski

Poll source	Date(s) administered	Sample size	Margin of error	George P. Bush (R)	Joe Jaworski (D)	Mark Ash (L)	Undecided
YouGov/TXHPF	March 18–28, 2022	1,139 (LV)	± 2.6%	38%	39%	8%	15%

Ken Paxton vs. Joe Jaworski

Poll source	Date(s) administered	Sample size	Margin of error	Ken Paxton (R)	Joe Jaworski (D)	Mark Ash (L)	Undecided
YouGov/TXHPF	March 18–28, 2022	1,139 (LV)	± 2.6%	48%	41%	3%	8%

Ken Paxton vs. Justin Nelson

Poll source	Date(s) administered	Sample size	Margin of error	Ken Paxton (R)	Justin Nelson (D)	Undecided
Data for Progress (D) (Note: Poll sponsored by the Defend Students Action Fund)	September 15–22, 2020	726 (LV)	± 3.6%	41%	37%	22%

=== Results ===
State Senate district results

State House district results

2022 Texas Attorney General election
Party	Candidate	Votes	%	±%
Republican	Ken Paxton (incumbent)	4,278,986	53.42%	+2.85%
Democratic	Rochelle Garza	3,497,267	43.66%	−3.35%
Libertarian	Mark Ash	233,750	2.92%	+0.49%
Total votes		8,010,003	100.00%	
Republican hold				

==== By congressional district ====
Paxton won 25 of 38 congressional districts.

District	Paxton	Garza	Representative
1st	76%	22%	Louie Gohmert (117th Congress)
1st	76%	22%	Nathaniel Moran (118th Congress)
2nd	61%	36%	Dan Crenshaw
3rd	57%	39%	Van Taylor (117th Congress)
3rd	57%	39%	Keith Self (118th Congress)
4th	64%	33%	Pat Fallon
5th	62%	35%	Lance Gooden
6th	63%	34%	Jake Ellzey
7th	35%	63%	Lizzie Fletcher
8th	66%	32%	Kevin Brady (117th Congress)
8th	66%	32%	Morgan Luttrell (118th Congress)
9th	23%	75%	Al Green
10th	60%	37%	Michael McCaul
11th	72%	25%	August Pfluger
12th	58%	38%	Kay Granger
13th	73%	24%	Ronny Jackson
14th	65%	32%	Randy Weber
15th	51%	47%	Vicente Gonzalez (117th Congress)
15th	51%	47%	Monica De La Cruz (118th Congress)
16th	34%	63%	Veronica Escobar
17th	63%	34%	Pete Sessions
18th	25%	72%	Sheila Jackson Lee
19th	75%	23%	Jodey Arrington
20th	32%	65%	Joaquín Castro
21st	59%	38%	Chip Roy
22nd	59%	39%	Troy Nehls
23rd	53%	44%	Tony Gonzales
24th	55%	41%	Beth Van Duyne
25th	66%	31%	Roger Williams
26th	59%	37%	Michael Burgess
27th	62%	35%	Michael Cloud
28th	45%	52%	Henry Cuellar
29th	30%	68%	Sylvia Garcia
30th	21%	76%	Eddie Bernice Johnson (117th Congress)
30th	21%	76%	Jasmine Crockett (118th Congress)
31st	59%	37%	John Carter
32nd	33%	64%	Colin Allred
33rd	25%	72%	Marc Veasey
34th	41%	57%	Mayra Flores (117th Congress)
34th	41%	57%	Vicente Gonzalez (118th Congress)
35th	25%	72%	Lloyd Doggett (117th Congress)
35th	25%	72%	Greg Casar (118th Congress)
36th	67%	31%	Brian Babin
37th	20%	77%	Lloyd Doggett
38th	59%	38%	Wesley Hunt

== Notes ==
Partisan clients

== See also ==
- 2022 United States attorney general elections
