= Leticia Gutierrez =

American politician

- Gutierrez in 2026

Member-elect of the U.S. House of Representatives from Texas's 9th district
- Assuming office January 3, 2027
- Succeeding: Al Green (redistricted)

Personal details
- Born: 1972 or 1973 (age 53–54) Mexico
- Party: Democratic
- Children: 2
- Education: University of St. Thomas (BS)

Leticia Gutierrez Ablaza (born 1972/1973) is an American politician. A member of the Democratic Party, she is the member-elect for the United States House of Representatives for Texas's 9th congressional district.

== Early life ==
Gutierrez was born in Mexico, in 1972 or 1973. Her parents were farmworkers. She moved to Houston as a child, and she graduated from Milby High School, located in the East End of Houston, and the University of St. Thomas.

== Career ==
Gutierrez worked as a community outreach organizer for Air Alliance Houston. She also served as chief of staff to Houston City Council member Helena Brown until her resignation in April 2012. Gutierrez was also an unsuccessful candidate for the Houston City Council in the 2011 and 2013 elections.

Gutierrez ran in the 2026 election for the United States House of Representatives for Texas's 9th congressional district. She defeated Alex Mealer in the general election.

== Personal life ==
Gutierrez has two children that she raised as a single mother. She traces her environmental advocacy work back to raising her older son who developed asthma as a child.

U.S. House of Representatives
Preceded by Al Green; Redistricted	Member of the U.S. House of Representatives from Texas's 9th congressional district Taking office 2027	Elect
