= 1980 United States House of Representatives elections in Texas =

- November 4, 1980

All 24 Texas seats to the United States House of Representatives
	Majority party	Minority party
Party	Democratic	Republican
Last election	20	4
Seats won	19	5
Seat change	▼1	▲1
Popular vote	2,405,026	1,608,636
Percentage	59.1%	39.5%
Swing	▲0.2%	▼1.2%
Democratic
50–60%
60–70%
70–80%
80–90%
90>%
Republican
50–60%
70–80%
80–90%

The 1980 United States House of Representatives elections in Texas occurred on November 4, 1980, to elect the members of the state of Texas's delegation to the United States House of Representatives. Texas had twenty-four seats in the House apportioned according to the 1970 United States census.

These elections occurred simultaneously with the United States Senate elections of 1980, the United States House elections in other states, the presidential election, and various state and local elections.

Democrats maintained their majority of U.S. House seats from Texas, but they lost one seat to the Republicans, decreasing their majority to nineteen out of twenty-four seats on the coattails of president Ronald Reagan's election.

== Overview ==
1980 United States House of Representatives elections in Texas
Party	Votes	Percentage	Seats before	Seats after	+/–
Democratic	2,405,026	59.11%	20	19	-1
Republican	1,608,636	39.54%	4	5	+1
Libertarian	52,820	1.30%	0	0	-
Independent	2,053	0.05%	0	0	-
Totals	4,068,535	100.00%	24	24	-

== Congressional districts ==
=== District 1 ===
Incumbent Democrat Sam B. Hall ran for re-election unopposed.

Texas's 1st congressional district, 1980
Party	Candidate	Votes	%
Democratic	Sam B. Hall (incumbent)	137,665	100.00
Total votes		137,665	100
Democratic hold			

=== District 2 ===
Incumbent Democrat Charlie Wilson ran for re-election.

Texas's 2nd congressional district, 1980
Party	Candidate	Votes	%
Democratic	Charlie Wilson (incumbent)	142,496	69.25
Republican	F.H. Pannill	60,742	29.52
Libertarian	Martin Sorrells	2,530	1.23
Total votes		205,768	100
Democratic hold			

=== District 3 ===
Incumbent Republican James M. Collins ran for re-election.

Texas's 3rd congressional district, 1980
Party	Candidate	Votes	%
Republican	James M. Collins (incumbent)	218,228	79.29
Democratic	Earle Stephen Porter	49,667	18.05
Libertarian	William Stephen Briggs	7,339	2.67
Total votes		275,234	100
Republican hold			

=== District 4 ===
Incumbent Democrat Ray Roberts opted to retire rather than run for re-election.

Texas's 4th congressional district, 1980
Party	Candidate	Votes	%
Democratic	Ralph M. Hall	102,787	52.26
Republican	John Wright	93,915	47.74
Total votes		196,702	100
Democratic hold			

=== District 5 ===
Incumbent Democrat Jim Mattox ran for re-election.

Texas's 5th congressional district, 1980
Party	Candidate	Votes	%
Democratic	Jim Mattox (incumbent)	70,892	50.99
Republican	Thomas W. Pauken	67,848	48.80
Write-in	Others	295	0.21
Total votes		139,035	100
Democratic hold			

=== District 6 ===
Incumbent Democrat Phil Gramm ran for re-election.

Texas's 6th congressional district, 1980
Party	Candidate	Votes	%
Democratic	Phil Gramm (incumbent)	144,816	70.88
Republican	Buster Haskins	59,503	29.12
Total votes		204,319	100
Democratic hold			

=== District 7 ===
Incumbent Republican Bill Archer ran for re-election.

Texas's 7th congressional district, 1980
Party	Candidate	Votes	%
Republican	Bill Archer (incumbent)	242,810	82.12
Democratic	Robert Hutchings	48,594	16.43
Libertarian	Bill Ware	4,278	1.45
Write-in	Others	2	0.00
Total votes		295,684	100
Republican hold			

=== District 8 ===
Incumbent Democrat Bob Eckhardt ran for re-election.

Texas's 8th congressional district, 1980
Party	Candidate	Votes	%
Republican	Jack Fields	72,856	51.75
Democratic	Bob Eckhardt (incumbent)	67,921	48.25
Total votes		140,777	100.00
Republican gain from Democratic			

=== District 9 ===
Incumbent Democrat Jack Brooks ran for re-election unopposed.

Texas's 9th congressional district, 1980
Party	Candidate	Votes	%
Democratic	Jack Brooks (incumbent)	103,225	99.66
Write-in	Others	349	0.34
Total votes		103,574	100
Democratic hold			

=== District 10 ===
Incumbent Democrat J. J. Pickle ran for re-election.

Texas's 10th congressional district, 1980
Party	Candidate	Votes	%
Democratic	J. J. Pickle (incumbent)	135,618	59.11
Republican	John Biggar	88,940	38.77
Libertarian	Michael Grossberg	4,866	2.12
Total votes		229,424	100
Democratic hold			

=== District 11 ===
Incumbent Democrat Marvin Leath ran for re-election unopposed.

Texas's 11th congressional district, 1980
Party	Candidate	Votes	%
Democratic	Marvin Leath (incumbent)	128,520	100.00
Total votes		128,520	100
Democratic hold			

=== District 12 ===
Incumbent Democrat Jim Wright ran for re-election.

Texas's 12th congressional district, 1980
Party	Candidate	Votes	%
Democratic	Jim Wright (incumbent)	99,104	59.92
Republican	Jim Bradshaw	65,005	39.30
Libertarian	C.B. Mauldin	1,281	0.78
Total votes		165,390	100
Democratic hold			

=== District 13 ===
Incumbent Democrat Jack Hightower ran for re-election.

Texas's 13th congressional district, 1980
Party	Candidate	Votes	%
Democratic	Jack Hightower (incumbent)	98,779	55.00
Republican	Ron Slover	80,819	45.00
Total votes		179,598	100
Democratic hold			

=== District 14 ===
Incumbent Democrat Joseph Wyatt opted to retire rather than run for re-election.

Texas's 14th congressional district, 1980
Party	Candidate	Votes	%
Democratic	Bill Patman	93,884	56.77
Republican	C.L. Concklin	71,495	43.23
Total votes		165,379	100
Democratic hold			

=== District 15 ===
Incumbent Democrat Kika de la Garza ran for re-election.

Texas's 15th congressional district, 1980
Party	Candidate	Votes	%
Democratic	Kika de la Garza (incumbent)	105,325	70.02
Republican	Lendy McDonald	45,090	29.98
Total votes		150,415	100
Democratic hold			

=== District 16 ===
Incumbent Democrat Richard Crawford White ran for re-election.

Texas's 16th congressional district, 1980
Party	Candidate	Votes	%
Democratic	Richard Crawford White (incumbent)	104,734	84.64
Libertarian	Catherine McDivitt	19,010	15.36
Total votes		123,744	100
Democratic hold			

=== District 17 ===
Incumbent Democrat Charles Stenholm ran for re-election unopposed.

Texas's 17th congressional district, 1980
Party	Candidate	Votes	%
Democratic	Charles Stenholm (incumbent)	130,465	100.00
Total votes		130,465	100
Democratic hold			

=== District 18 ===
Incumbent Democrat Mickey Leland ran for re-election.

Texas's 18th congressional district, 1980
Party	Candidate	Votes	%
Democratic	Mickey Leland (incumbent)	71,985	79.90
Republican	C.L. Kennedy	16,128	17.90
Libertarian	Bill Fraser	1,983	2.20
Total votes		90,096	100
Democratic hold			

=== District 19 ===
Incumbent Democrat Kent Hance ran for re-election.

Texas's 19th congressional district, 1980
Party	Candidate	Votes	%
Democratic	Kent Hance (incumbent)	126,632	93.51
Libertarian	J. D. Webster	8,792	6.49
Total votes		135,424	100
Democratic hold			

=== District 20 ===
Incumbent Democrat Henry B. González ran for re-election.

Texas's 20th congressional district, 1980
Party	Candidate	Votes	%
Democratic	Henry B. Gonzalez (incumbent)	84,133	81.93
Republican	Merle Nash	17,725	17.26
Libertarian	Tom Burnham	846	0.82
Write-in	Others	1	0.00
Total votes		102,685	100
Democratic hold			

=== District 21 ===
Incumbent Republican Tom Loeffler ran for re-election.

Texas's 21st congressional district, 1980
Party	Candidate	Votes	%
Republican	Tom Loeffler (incumbent)	196,424	76.50
Democratic	Joe Sullivan	58,425	22.76
Libertarian	William Rice	1,895	0.74
Total votes		256,744	100
Republican hold			

=== District 22 ===
Incumbent Republican Ron Paul ran for re-election.

Texas's 22nd congressional district, 1980
Party	Candidate	Votes	%
Republican	Ron Paul (incumbent)	106,797	51.04
Democratic	Michael A. Andrews	101,094	48.31
Independent	Vaudie Nance	1,360	0.65
Total votes		209,251	100
Republican hold			

=== District 23 ===
Incumbent Democrat Abraham Kazen ran for re-election.

Texas's 23rd congressional district, 1980
Party	Candidate	Votes	%
Democratic	Abraham Kazen (incumbent)	104,595	69.83
Republican	Bobby Locke	45,139	30.14
Write-in	Others	46	0.03
Total votes		149,780	100
Democratic hold			

=== District 24 ===
Incumbent Democrat Martin Frost ran for re-election.

Texas's 24th congressional district, 1980
Party	Candidate	Votes	%
Democratic	Martin Frost (incumbent)	93,690	61.29
Republican	Clay Smothers	59,172	38.71
Total votes		152,862	100
Democratic hold			
