= Rochelle Mercedes Garza =

American legal scholar

Rochelle Garza
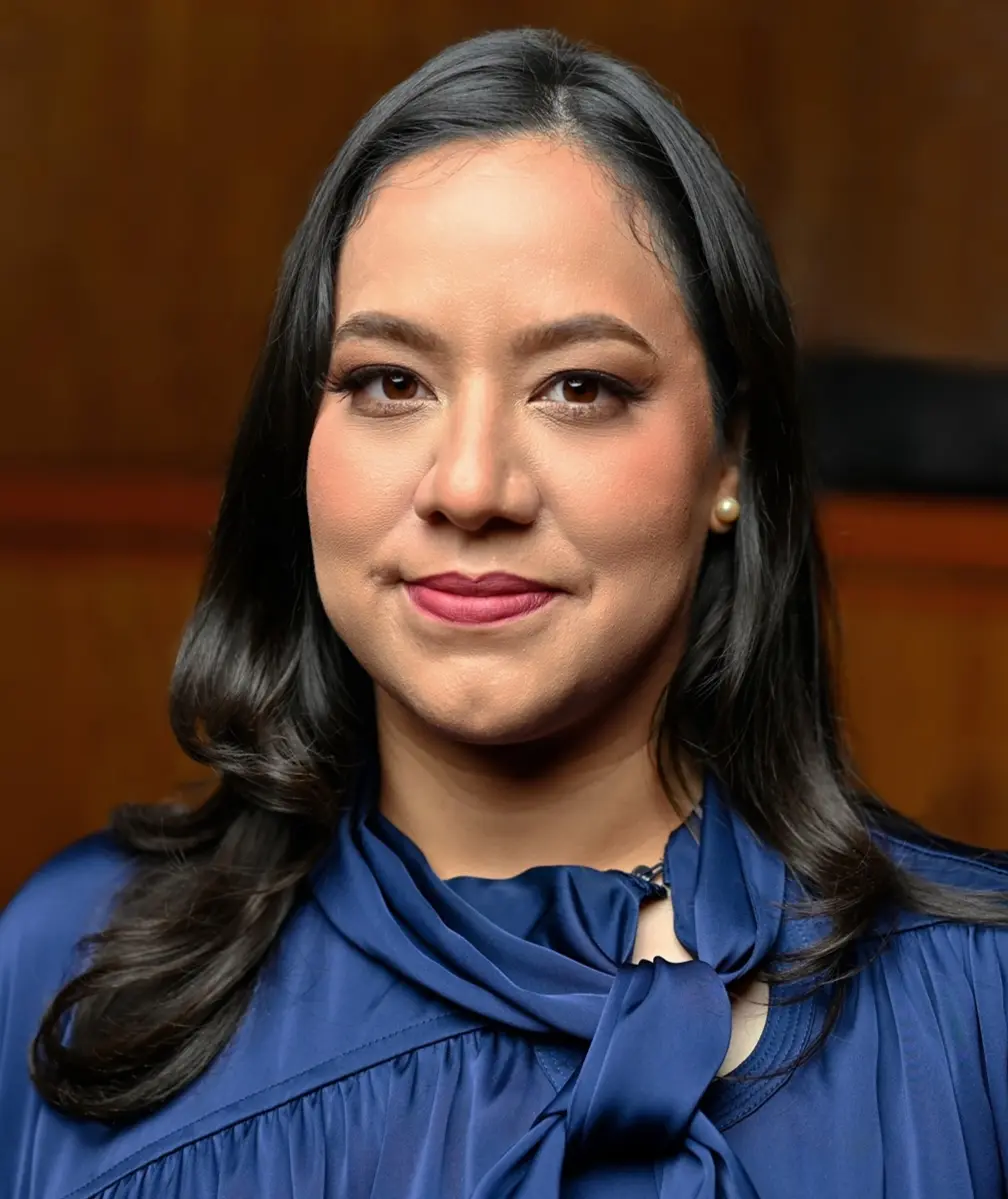

Chair of the United States Commission on Civil Rights
- In office March 17, 2023 – January 20, 2025
- President: Joe Biden
- Preceded by: Norma V. Cantu
- Succeeded by: Peter Kirsanow

Personal details
- Born: 1984 or 1985 (age 41–42)
- Party: Democratic
- Education: Brown University (BA); University of Houston (JD)

Rochelle Mercedes Garza (born 1984/1985) is an American attorney from Brownsville, Texas who serves as the chair of the United States Commission on Civil Rights. She is a civil rights attorney who practices family law, criminal defense, Immigration law, constitutional law and is the president of the Texas Civil Rights Project.

== Early life and education ==
Garza was raised in Brownsville, Texas. Both of her parents were public school teachers. Her father became a teacher, a lawyer and then served South Texas as an elected State District Judge for 21 years. Garza earned her Bachelor of Arts degree with honors from Brown University in 2007 and her Juris Doctor from University of Houston Law Center in 2013.

== Career ==
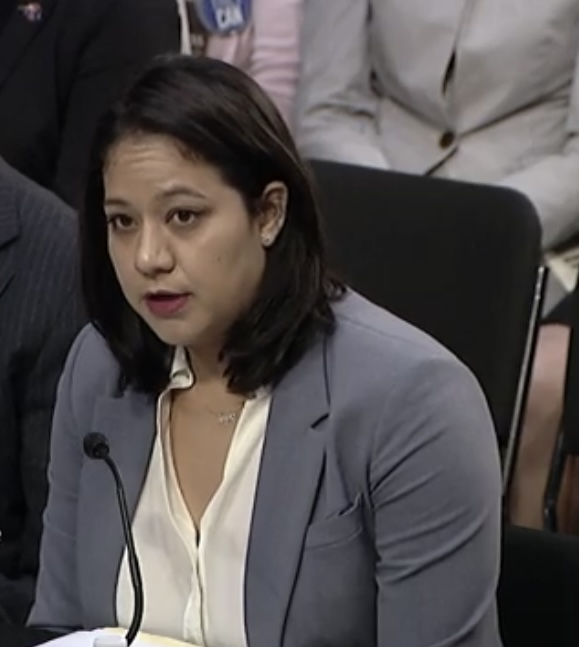
Garza testifying at the confirmation hearing of Brett Kavanaugh in 2018

Garza was a staff attorney for the ACLU. Garza became a managing partner of Garza & Garza Law, PLLC. Garza was a board member at Moody Clinic (January 2018 – January 2020), Director of the Cameron County Bar Association (May 2018 – December 2021), Chair at the Ethics Advisory Committee, City of Brownsville, Texas (January 2021 – July 2021) and a board member at Jane's Due Process since February 2019. On January 26, 2023, Garza was announced as president of the Texas Civil Rights Project, a civil rights litigation and advocacy organization for voting rights, immigration and criminal justice work.

=== Notable cases ===
Garza represented a 17-year-old girl who came to the United States without her parents, and who resided in a government-funded shelter in Texas. The Trump administration would not allow her to leave the shelter to get an abortion. In 2017 the "Garza Notice", requiring that access to reproductive care be provided to teenagers housed in federal immigration detention facilities, was named after her.

== Attorney General election ==
In 2022, Garza was the Texas Democratic Party nominee for Attorney General. Garza won the runoff election, becoming the first Latina nominee for Texas attorney general.

Garza was unsuccessful in the general election against incumbent Republican Ken Paxton. Garza received 43.7%, 3,482,909 votes while Paxton received 53.4%, 4,268,826 votes.

== Personal life ==
Garza grew up in a Catholic household. According to her mother, she was crowd-surfed to Pope John Paul II at eight months old and blessed by the Pope. Her brother, Robby, experienced a brain injury during childbirth that resulted in disabilities and he died before she went to college.

Party political offices
Preceded by Justin Nelson	Democratic nominee for Attorney General of Texas; 2022	Succeeded by Nathan Johnson
