= EL CHAPO Act =

United States Congress bill introduced by Ted Cruz

Ensuring Lawful Collection of Hidden Assets to Provide Order Act
- Long title: To reserve any amounts forfeited to the United States Government as a result of the criminal prosecution of Joaquin Archivaldo Guzman Loera (commonly known as “El Chapo”), or of other felony convictions involving the transportation of controlled substances into the United States, for security measures along the Southern border, including the completion of a border wall.
- Acronyms (colloquial): EL CHAPO Act
- Announced in: the 115th United States Congress
- Number of co-sponsors: 11

Codification
- Agencies affected: United States Department of Homeland Security, U.S. Customs and Border Protection, United States Department of Justice

Legislative history
- Introduced in the House of Representatives as H.R. 2186 by Mo Brooks (R-AL) on April 27, 2017; Committee consideration by House Judiciary Subcommittee on Immigration and Border Security; House Judiciary Subcommittee on Crime, Terrorism, Homeland Security, and Investigations

The Ensuring Lawful Collection of Hidden Assets to Provide Order Act (H.R. 2186), abbreviated as the EL CHAPO Act, is a United States Congress bill that would reserve any amount of money seized by the U.S. Government as a result of the criminal prosecution of Joaquín "El Chapo" Guzmán and other felony convictions involving the transportation of controlled substances into the United States for security measures along the U.S.-Mexico border and the construction of a border wall.

== Background ==
Joaquín "El Chapo" Guzmán is a Mexican drug lord who headed the Sinaloa Cartel, a criminal organization named after the Mexican Pacific coast state of Sinaloa where it was formed. Known as "El Chapo" ("Shorty" in Spanish) for his 5 ft 6 in (168 cm) stature, he became Mexico's top drug kingpin in 2003 after the arrest of his rival Osiel Cárdenas of the Gulf Cartel, and was considered the "most powerful drug trafficker in the world" by the United States Department of the Treasury. He was captured on January 8, 2016, in Mexico after his third escape from prison. He was extradited to the United States a year later on January 19, 2017, to face charges there related to his leadership of the Sinaloa Cartel.

Guzmán was convicted in federal court for drug trafficking crimes in January 2019.

== Provisions and analysis ==
The legislation would require any money seized by the United States from Guzmán and other "drug lords" via asset forfeiture to pay for a border wall along the U.S.-Mexico border. This would be a change from the usual practice of the U.S. government, which is to deposit the seized assets of drug smugglers into the U.S. Department of Justice's Assets Forfeiture Fund, which is first used to "satisfying valid liens, mortgages, and other innocent owner claims, and costs associated with accomplishing the legal forfeiture of the property" and is also used to fund enforcement training, equipment, and investigations.

Experts state that the legislation would be ineffective at raising sufficient sums for construction of a border wall. Although DOJ has estimated Guzmán's wealth at $14 billion based on an estimate of Sinaloa Cartel activities, Guzmán's actual savings are far smaller (possibly $1 billion or less), much of which may be laundered or concealed. Experts have also expressed concerns about the potentially negative impact of diverting forfeiture assets from law enforcement activities to a border wall.

== History ==
Senator Ted Cruz (R-TX) introduced the bill in the United States Senate in 2017. Companion legislation in the House was introduced in 2017 by Mo Brooks (R-AL) and co-sponsored by eleven Republican representatives: Kevin Brady (TX-8), Steve King (IA-4), Louie Gohmert (TX-1), Tom Garrett, Jr. (VA-5), Lamar S. Smith (TX-21), Walter B. Jones, Jr. (NC-3), Paul Gosar (AZ-4), Ron DeSantis (FL-6), Joe Wilson (SC-2), Gary Palmer (AL-6), and Kevin Cramer (ND-At-large). Neither the House nor the Senate version of the legislation received committee or floor votes, and the legislation died at the end of the 115th Congress.

Cruz reintroduced the "El Chapo Act" in January 2019, in the 116th Congress.
