= SMU business plan competition =

The SMU Business Plan Competition provides students with the opportunity to work with fellow SMU students to create a viable business venture. Since its inception in 2001, teams have competed for cash prizes and in-kind awards such as office space, legal advice, and PR. Sponsors have included Andrews Kurth LLP, NTEC, Ignite Restaurant Group, Austin Ventures, and The Coulter Group.

== Phases of the Competition ==
The competition has four phases. In the fall, the Strategy & Entrepreneurship Club hosts mixers, where students from the Cox School of Business, Lyle School of Engineering, Dedman School of Law, and others from SMU have the opportunity to interact in order to form teams for the competition. Throughout the process teams receive guidance and consultation from local entrepreneurs and investors to fine-tune their plans. In December, the Executive Summaries are evaluated and finalists determined. Selected teams receive further guidance and coaching as they finalize their business plans. All teams that submit an executive summary are eligible to compete in the elevator pitch competition for a cash prize. All events take place on the SMU campus, including the final presentations, where teams pitch their ideas in front of a panel of judges composed of venture capitalists, early-stage investors, and entrepreneurs.

During the 2011–2012 school year, cash and in-kind sponsorships exceeded $50,000. This accomplishment is a result of contributions from our sponsors in the Dallas business community. Many past participants have commented that this competition was the most beneficial experience for their future careers while at SMU.

== Notable Past Winners ==
2018: StreamChain: Sarah McKinnon, Carl Sykes, and Genesh Natesan
2017: Phylomics: Bhavesh Pranav, Ashley Tonti, Benjamin Herrmann
2013: MyShopAssist: Todd Earsley and Sean Tremblay
2012: BoundAround: Adam Crishi, Robert Watts
2011: Car Pulls
2010: MP Flow
2009: Collabpad: Alex Bagdan, Ryan Thrash and team
2008: Lab801: Alex Bagden, Chris Irvine, Matthew Vroom (non-student)
2007: Follow My Band: John Cole (undergrad), Jennifer McNabb (undergrad), Rick Collins
2006: Table Top Media: Shawn Gentry, Raymond Howard & Viren Balar
2004: Texas Whitewater Stadium: Chris Hanna
2003: Hieroglyph Interactive: Craig York
2002: FirstPass: Felipe Mendoza, Roy Hensley, Brian Doffing
