= James H. Davis =

James H. Davis may refer to:

- Jimmie Davis (James Houston Davis, 1899–2000), American singer and governor of Louisiana
- James H. Davis (Texas politician) (1853–1940), U.S. Representative from Texas
