= Kenyon & Kenyon =

Kenyon & Kenyon LLP
- Headquarters: New York City
- No. of offices: 3
- No. of attorneys: 220 in 2006; 96 at end of 2015
- Major practice areas: Intellectual property
- Key people: Edward T. Colbert, Managing Partner
- Date founded: 1879
- Founder: William H. Kenyon
- Company type: Limited liability partnership
- Dissolved: 2016; 55 attorneys hired by Andrews Kurth Kenyon LLP
- Website: www.kenyon.com

Kenyon & Kenyon LLP was a law firm specializing in intellectual property law. It competed with other IP specialty firms, as well as with most general practice firms that have IP practices.

== Overview ==
The firm had offices in New York, Washington DC, and Silicon Valley. It provided its global clientele with litigation, prosecution, licensing and counseling services. The firm was particularly known for litigating high-stakes patent cases. In 2016, Kenyon dissolved and 55 of its attorneys were hired by Andrews Kurth, which then renamed itself to Andrews Kurth Kenyon LLP to reflect the firm's expanded expertise in intellectual property and technology.

== History ==
In January 1879, the firm was founded in New York City as Browne & Witter through the partnership of Causten Browne and William C. Witter. Soon thereafter, the firm was renamed Browne, Witter and Kenyon after William H. Kenyon joined the partnership.

In its early history, the firm litigated cases involving patents held by Thomas Edison, Nikola Tesla, and Charles Brush, which would later become known as the famous "Edison Light Bulb" patent cases. At the turn of the 20th century, when the automotive industry was beginning to take shape, the firm was also invited by Ford Motor Co. to defend it in a patent case involving the Selden patent, which threatened to stop production of Ford's new "Model T."

By the 1960s, the firm had become Kenyon, Kenyon, Reilly, Carr and Chapin, which was later simplified to Kenyon & Kenyon, following the trend to simplify law firm names in the 1990s.
