= Jessica Hart =

Jessica Hart may refer to:

- Jessica Hart (model) (born 1986), Australian model
- Jessica Steinmann (née Jessica Hart, born 1984), American politician from Texas

== See also ==
- Pamela Hartshorne, British romance novelist who sometimes used the acronym Jessica Hart
