= Albert Thomas (American politician) =

American Texan politician (1898–1966)

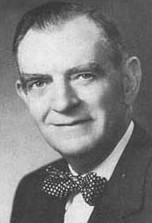

Member of the U.S. House of Representatives from Texas's 8th district
- In office January 3, 1937 – February 15, 1966
- Preceded by: Joe H. Eagle
- Succeeded by: Lera Millard Thomas

Personal details
- Born: April 12, 1898 Nacogdoches, Texas, U.S.
- Died: February 15, 1966 (aged 67) Washington, D.C., U.S.
- Party: Democratic
- Spouse: Lera Millard Thomas
- Children: 3
- Education: Rice Institute; University of Texas

Albert Langston Thomas (April 12, 1898 – February 15, 1966) was an American politician who served in the U.S. House of Representatives from 1937 until his death in 1966. A member of the Democratic Party, he was responsible for bringing the Johnson Space Center to Houston.

== Early life ==
Thomas was born in Nacogdoches, Texas, on April 12, 1898, to James and Lonnie (née Langston) Thomas. He attended local schools, worked in his father's store, and served as a lieutenant in the United States Army during World War I before graduating from the Rice Institute and the University of Texas Law School. He married Lera Millard. Thomas was admitted to the bar in 1927, and he practiced law and served as Nacogdoches County Attorney before moving to Houston in 1930 to become Assistant United States Attorney for the Southern District of Texas.

== Congressional career ==
United States President John F. Kennedy shares a moment with U.S. Rep. Albert Thomas at the Houston dinner honoring the congressman on November 21, 1963. Photo by Houston Chronicle

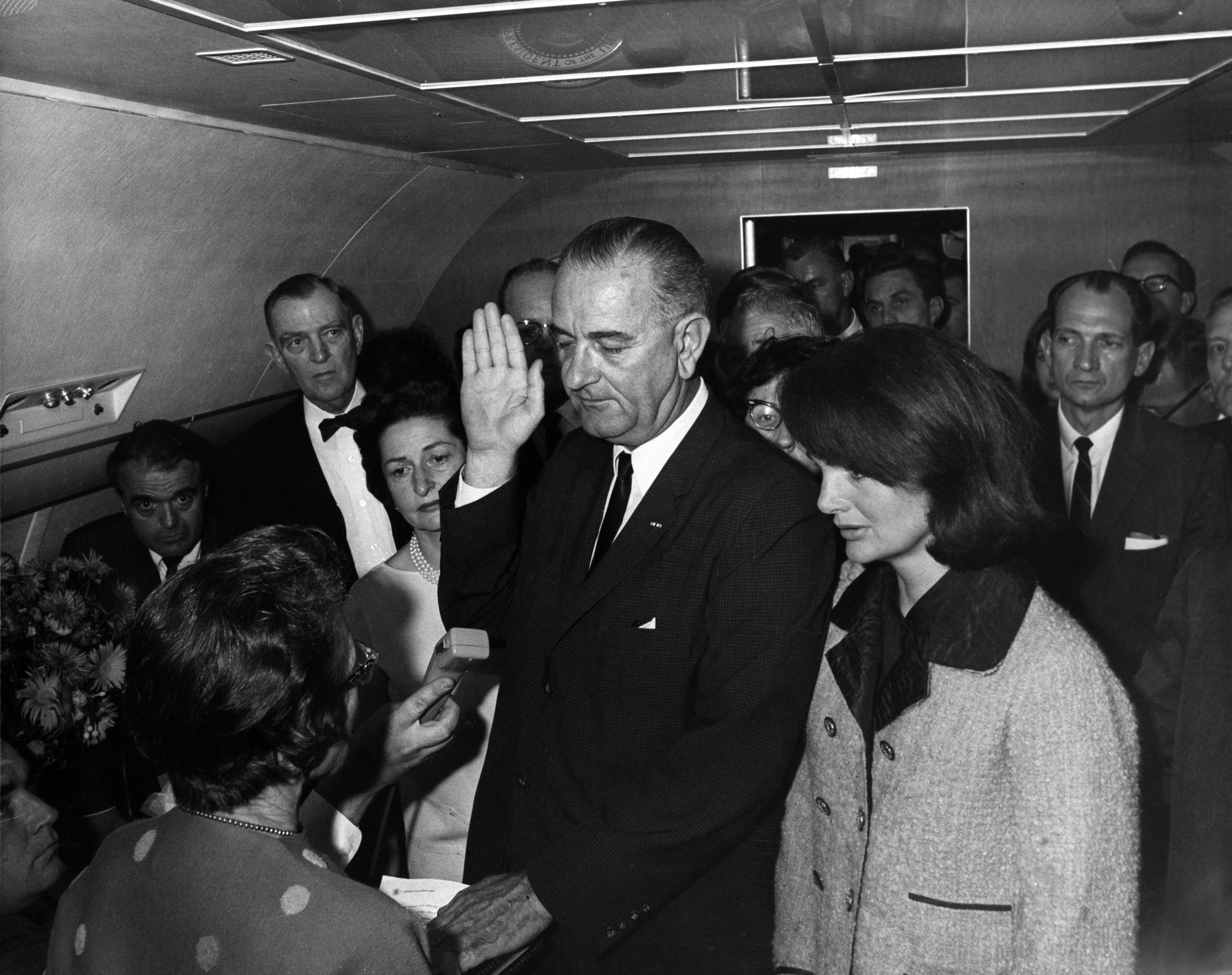
Thomas (with bow tie) at the swearing in of Lyndon B. Johnson on November 22, 1963

When long-time congressman Joe H. Eagle did not seek reelection in 1936 so he could run for the United States Senate, Thomas sought and won the Democratic nomination, which was tantamount to election. In that primary, Thomas beat Houston mayor Oscar F. Holcombe in what was something of an upset. The Eighth District of Texas at that time comprised all of Harris County, which included the state's largest city, Houston.

In Congress, Thomas was a protégé of Texas Senator (later President) Lyndon B. Johnson but maintained a generally conservative voting record. In 1949, he became chairman of the House subcommittee on independent office appropriations. He also served on the subcommittee on defense appropriations and on the joint committee on Texas House delegation. He was a typical Southern Democrat who through seniority rose to be the Chairman of the House Appropriations Committee's subcommittee on defense. In that capacity, he was able to steer projects to Texas including supporting Johnson's proposal to build the Corpus Christi Naval Air Station. Thomas also served on the Joint Committee on Atomic Energy and was instrumental in securing the location of the United States National Aeronautics & Space Administration's Manned Spacecraft Center (later named after Lyndon Johnson) in Houston in 1961. Since its inception, Johnson Space Center has served as mission control for every U.S. crewed space flight including Apollo 11, the first lunar landing.

Thomas was a member of the Suite 8F Group, a group of influential businessmen that included his college roommate at Rice University, George R. Brown. Brown's company Brown and Root donated the land on which the Johnson Space Center would be located to Rice University. Then Vice President Lyndon Johnson was chairman of the Space Council, and Thomas, a member of the NASA board, played leading roles in the eventual acceptance of Rice University's offer.

Along with the majority of the Texan delegation, Thomas declined to sign the 1956 Southern Manifesto opposing the desegregation of public schools ordered by the Supreme Court in Brown v. Board of Education. Thomas voted against the Civil Rights Acts of 1957 and 1960, but voted in favor of the 24th Amendment to the U.S. Constitution and the Civil Rights Act of 1964, and did not vote on the Voting Rights Act of 1965. Nevertheless, Thomas had a mostly liberal voting record during his tenure in Congress.

=== Appreciation dinner in 1963 ===
President Johnson giving Thomas the "Johnson Treatment" during a phone call on December 20, 1963

In 1963, Thomas was seriously considering not running for a fifteenth term. Local Democrats organized an appreciation dinner on November 21, 1963, with over 3,200 attendees to persuade him to run for another term. The most visible attendees were President John F. Kennedy and Vice President Lyndon B. Johnson who both spoke of Thomas's leadership. Kennedy said, "Next month, when the United States of America fires the largest booster in the history of the world into space for the first time, giving us the lead, fires the largest, payroll -- payload -- into space, giving us the lead. " Here the President paused a second and grinned. "It will be the largest payroll, too," he quipped. The crowd roared. "And who should know that better than Houston. We put a little of it right in here." The President then resumed in a more serious vein, "But in any case, the United States next month will have a leadership in space which it wouldn't have without Albert Thomas. And so will this city."

Thomas accompanied the presidential party as it traveled to Dallas the next day, where President Kennedy was assassinated. He witnessed the swearing in of President Lyndon B. Johnson on Air Force One. The infamous “wink photo” was taken shortly thereafter.

In 1964, Thomas was named Chairman of the House Democratic Caucus.

By the time of his death in Washington, D.C., on February 15, 1966, at the age of 67, Thomas ranked eleventh in seniority in the House. The voters of Harris County elected his wife Lera Thomas to complete his term. Lera Thomas was the first woman to represent Texas in the U.S. House of Representatives. In the fall of 1967, downtown Houston's Albert Thomas Convention and Exhibit Center (renovated in the late 1990s as the Bayou Place entertainment and dining complex) was built and named in his honor. He is interred in Houston National Cemetery.

== See also ==
- List of members of the United States Congress who died in office (1950–1999)

== Notes ==
U.S. House of Representatives
Preceded by Joe H. Eagle	Member of the U.S. House of Representatives from Texas's 8th congressional district 1937–1966	Succeeded by Lera Millard Thomas
