= Lera Millard Thomas =

American politician (1900–1993)

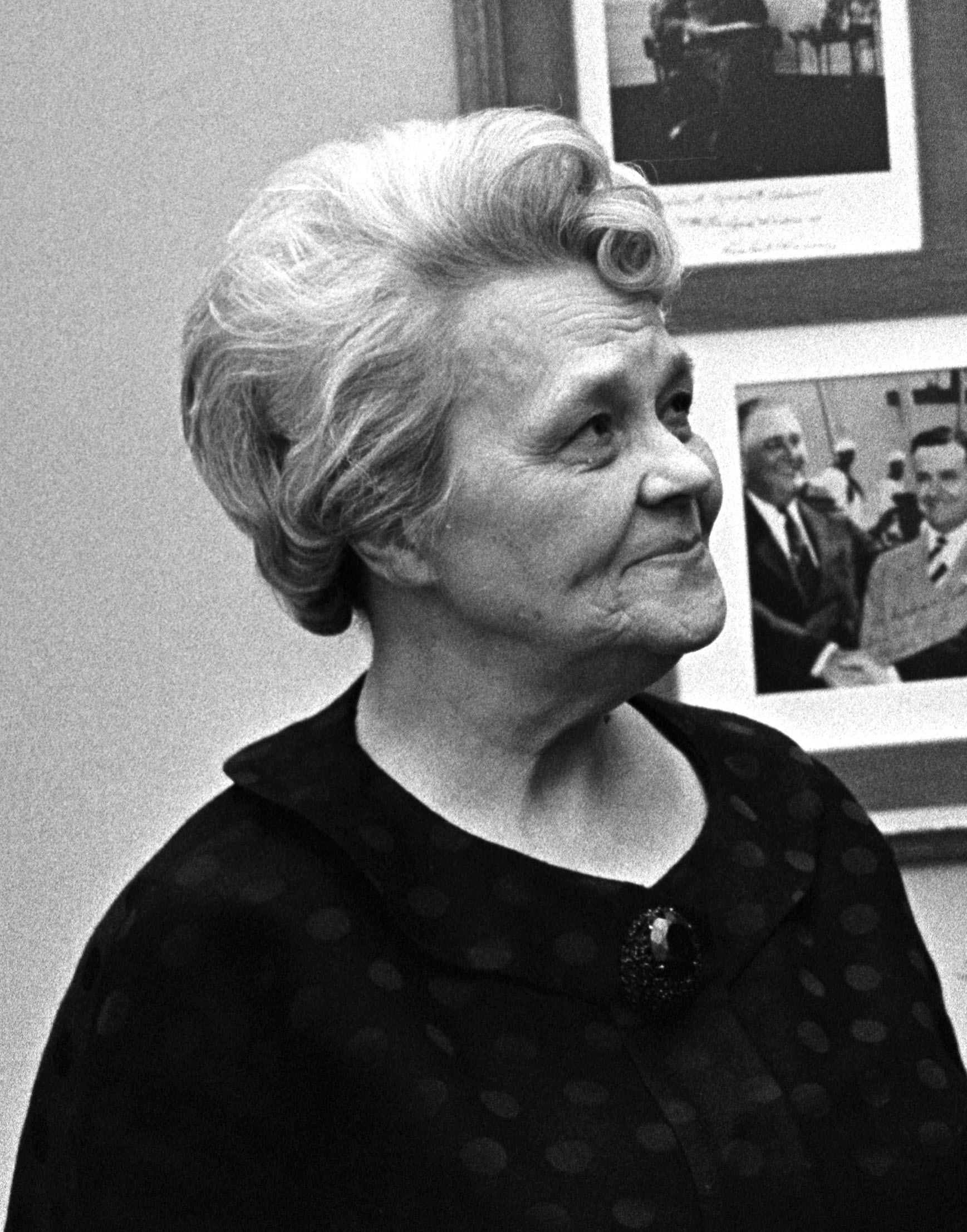
- Thomas in 1966

Member of the U.S. House of Representatives from Texas's 8th district
- In office March 26, 1966 – January 3, 1967
- Preceded by: Albert Thomas
- Succeeded by: Bob Eckhardt

Personal details
- Born: Lera Millard; August 3, 1900 Nacogdoches, Texas, U.S.
- Died: July 23, 1993 (aged 92) Nacogdoches, Texas, U.S.
- Party: Democratic
- Spouse: Albert Thomas
- Children: 3
- Parents: Jesse Waldington Millard (father); Annie Donnell Watkins (mother)
- Education: Brenau College; University of Alabama
- Occupation: Homemaker; politician

Lera Millard Thomas (August 3, 1900 – July 23, 1993) was an American politician who served as a member of the United States House of Representatives for the Eighth District of Texas from 1966 to 1967, after the death of her husband, longtime Representative Albert Thomas. She was the first woman to represent Texas in the U.S. House. She also founded Millard's Crossing Historic Village.

== Early life ==
Thomas was born Lera Millard on August 3, 1900, in Nacogdoches, Texas, the daughter of Jesse Waldington and Annie Donnell (née Watkins) Millard. She attended Brenau College in Gainesville, Georgia, and the University of Alabama. She married Albert Thomas in 1922, and they had three children: James Nelson, Anne, and Lera. Albert was elected to Congress in 1936, and—as he held a safe seat—they mostly lived in Washington, D.C. for the rest of his congressional career. Lera was a member of the Houston League of Women Voters.

== Elected to Congress ==
On February 15, 1966, Albert Thomas died and a special election was called for March 26, 1966 to elect a successor for the remainder of his term, which was to end January 3, 1967. Elected as a Democrat—like her husband—in the special election, Lera Thomas was the first woman elected to Congress from the State of Texas. She received over 74% of the vote against Republican Louis Leman, who urged voters to vote for the Widow Thomas.

Thomas served on the Merchant Marine and Fisheries Committee, where she supported funds to expand the Houston Ship Channel. She also continued her husband's work in the creation of a NASA branch within her district, adjacent to other existing laboratories.

Because he died after filing for re-election, Albert Thomas's name remained on the Democratic primary ballot for the 8th District and his widow determined that she would not seek a full term. State Representative Bob Eckhardt won the primary and then the general election in November. After serving the remainder of her husband's term, Lera Thomas served as special liaison for the Houston Chronicle to members of the armed services in Vietnam.

== Later years ==
When she returned from Vietnam, Thomas founded Millard's Crossing Historic Village in her hometown of Nacogdoches. She served on the board of regents at Stephen F. Austin State University for one year, and became a member of the Daughters of the American Revolution and the Daughters of the Republic of Texas.

Later in life, Thomas received many awards within her community. These awards included the Yellow Rose of Texas Award in 1977, the Ralph W. Steen Award in 1979, and the Texas Governor's Tourist Development Award and the Sons of the Republic of Texas Distinguished Service Award in 1985. She was chosen as Woman of the Day by the Nacogdoches branch of the American Association of University Women in 1990, and in 1991 she was named a Paul Harris Fellow by Rotary International. She resided in Nacogdoches until her death there on July 23, 1993, and was interred in Oak Grove Cemetery.

== See also ==
- Women in the United States House of Representatives

U.S. House of Representatives
| Preceded by Albert Thomas | Member of the U.S. House of Representatives from Texas's 8th congressional district 1966–1967 | Succeeded by Bob Eckhardt |
