= Daniel E. Garrett =

American politician (1869–1932)

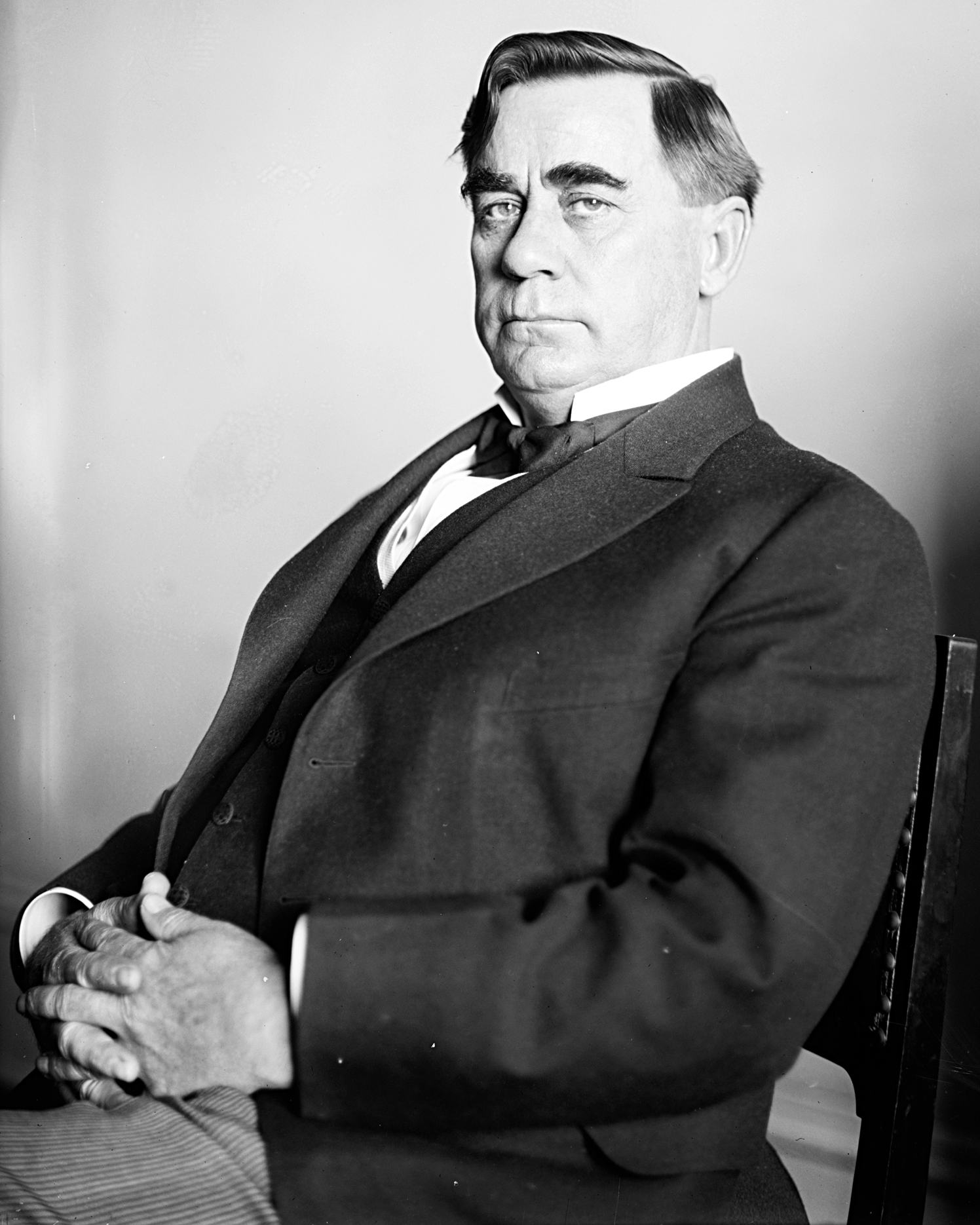

Member of the U.S. House of Representatives from Texas
- In office March 4, 1913 – March 3, 1915
- Preceded by: District created
- Succeeded by: James H. Davis
- Constituency: at-large district
- In office March 4, 1917 – March 3, 1919
- Preceded by: James H. Davis
- Succeeded by: Thomas L. Blanton
- Constituency: at-large district
- In office March 4, 1921 – December 13, 1932
- Preceded by: Joe H. Eagle
- Succeeded by: Joe H. Eagle
- Constituency: 8th district

Member of the Tennessee Senate
- In office 1903–1905

Member of the Tennessee House of Representatives
- In office 1893–1897

Personal details
- Born: Daniel Edward Garrett; April 28, 1869 Springfield, Tennessee, U.S.
- Died: December 13, 1932 (aged 63) Washington, D.C., U.S.
- Resting place: Forest Park Cemetery, Houston, Texas, U.S.
- Party: Democratic

Daniel Edward Garrett (April 28, 1869 – December 13, 1932) was a Democratic U.S. representative from Texas, elected at large and later from the 8th district of Texas.

== Early life and career in politics ==
Garrett was born near Springfield, Tennessee, in Robertson County, and he attended the common schools of his native county. He studied law and was admitted to the bar and commenced practice in Springfield, Tennessee, in 1893. He was elected as a member of the Tennessee House of Representatives in 1892 and 1894, serving from 1893–1897. Subsequently, Garrett was elected to the Tennessee State Senate in 1902 and again in 1904, serving from 1903 to 1905.

== Move to Texas ==
He moved to Houston, Texas, in 1905 and continued the practice of law. Garrett was elected at-large as a Democrat to the Sixty-third Congress from (March 4, 1913 – March 3, 1915). He was defeated for reelection in 1914 by James H. Davis and he resumed the practice of law in Houston. In 1917, Garrett ran again against Davis for the at-large seat and won, serving from (March 4, 1917 – March 3, 1919). He was not a candidate for renomination in 1918.

In 1920, Garrett ran for election to the vacant 8th District seat which comprised the city of Houston and the surrounding counties, when Joe H. Eagle retired. Garrett was elected and served from March 4, 1921, until his death. He died in Washington, D.C., on December 13, 1932. He is interred in Forest Park Cemetery in Houston.

== Memorials ==
The Liberty Ship USS Daniel E. Garrett was named for the congressman and was deployed during World War II.

== See also ==
- List of members of the United States Congress who died in office (1900–1949)

== Sources ==
- United States Congress. "Daniel E. Garrett (id: G000081)". Biographical Directory of the United States Congress.

U.S. House of Representatives
Preceded by District created	Member of the U.S. House of Representatives from Texas's at-large congressional seat 1913-1915	Succeeded by James H. Davis
Preceded by James H. Davis	Member of the U.S. House of Representatives from Texas's at-large congressional seat 1917-1919	Succeeded by Thomas L. Blanton
Preceded by Joe H. Eagle	Member of the U.S. House of Representatives from Texas's 8th congressional district 1921-1932	Succeeded by Joe H. Eagle
