= Frank Andrews (Texas lawyer) =

American lawyer (1864–1936)

Assistant Attorney General of Texas
- In office 1891–1895

Personal details
- Born: June 15, 1864 Fayetteville, Texas, U.S.
- Died: December 7, 1936 (aged 72) Houston, Texas, U.S.
- Resting place: Glenwood Cemetery
- Party: Democratic
- Spouse: Roxalee Smith (m. 1891)
- Children: 2
- Education: Southwestern University (BA)
- Occupation: Lawyer

Frank Andrews (June 15, 1864 – December 7, 1936) was the assistant attorney general of Texas from 1891 to 1895.

== Early life ==
Frank Andrews was born on June 15, 1864, in Fayetteville, Texas, to Martha (née Sellers) and G. L. Andrews. His father was a Baptist minister. Andrews attended public schools and graduated with a Bachelor of Arts from Southwestern University in 1885. He then taught school for two years while studying law at night. He was admitted to the bar in 1887.

== Career ==
Andrews began practicing law in Belton. He was appointed assistant attorney general of Texas by attorney general Charles A. Culberson. He held the position from January 15, 1891, to his resignation in 1895. During his tenure, he represented the Gulf Coast Lines railroad and its reorganization into the New Orleans, Texas & Mexico Railroad. He also helped found the Bankers Trust Company and Union National Bank, opened the Union Station in Houston, served as draft board chairman during World War I, won the first $2 million judgement in Texas in a receivership case, represented the Federal National Mortgage Corporation and Reconstruction Finance Corporation as part of FDR's New Deal, and organized General Crude Oil Company.

Andrews then practiced law in Houston. He was a member of the law firm Andrews, Kelley, Kurth and Campbell (later Andrews Kurth). Thomas H. Ball, Sam Streetman, John Logue and John A. Mobley were members of his law firm. He was also associated with Melvin Kurth and Robert Kelly. He did work for the St. Louis, Brownsville and Mexico Railway. He was a receiver for the railroad from 1916 to 1918 and afterward helped with the policy of the railroad. He was known for advising Standard Oil to send workers to South America.

Andrews served as the chairman of the Democratic executive committee from 1904 to 1906. He declined appointment to the Supreme Court of Texas in 1918.

== Personal life ==
Andrews married Roxalee Smith, daughter of Baylor professor James L. Smith, of Salado on December 22, 1891. They had two sons, Edward and Forrest Lee.

Andrews died on December 7, 1936, at his home in Houston. He was buried in Glenwood Cemetery.
