= Jessica Steinmann =

American politician (born 1984)

Member-elect of the U.S. House of Representatives from Texas's 8th district
- Assuming office January 3, 2027
- Succeeding: Morgan Luttrell

Personal details
- Born: Jessica Elizabeth Hart; February 5, 1984 (age 42) Houston, Texas, U.S.
- Party: Republican
- Spouse: Brandon Steinmann
- Children: 2
- Education: University of Texas, Austin (BBA); Baylor University (JD)
- Website: Campaign website

Jessica Elizabeth Hart Steinmann (née Hart; born February 5, 1984) is an American politician from Texas. A Republican, she is the member-elect for Texas's 8th congressional district in the United States House of Representatives.

Steinmann was born in Houston, Texas, on February 5, 1984, and spent her childhood in England before returning to the United States for high school. She earned her bachelor's degree from the University of Texas, Austin and her J.D. degree from Baylor University. Steinmann is the general counsel for the America First Policy Institute.

Steinmann ran in the 2026 US House of Representatives elections to succeed Morgan Luttrell as the member-elect to the United States House of Representatives for Texas's 8th congressional district. She defeated Laura Jones in the November general election.

She is married to Montgomery County clerk Brandon Steinmann and has two children.

U.S. House of Representatives
Preceded by Morgan Luttrell	Member of the U.S. House of Representatives from Texas's 8th congressional district Taking office 2027	Elect
