= Joe H. Eagle =

American politician

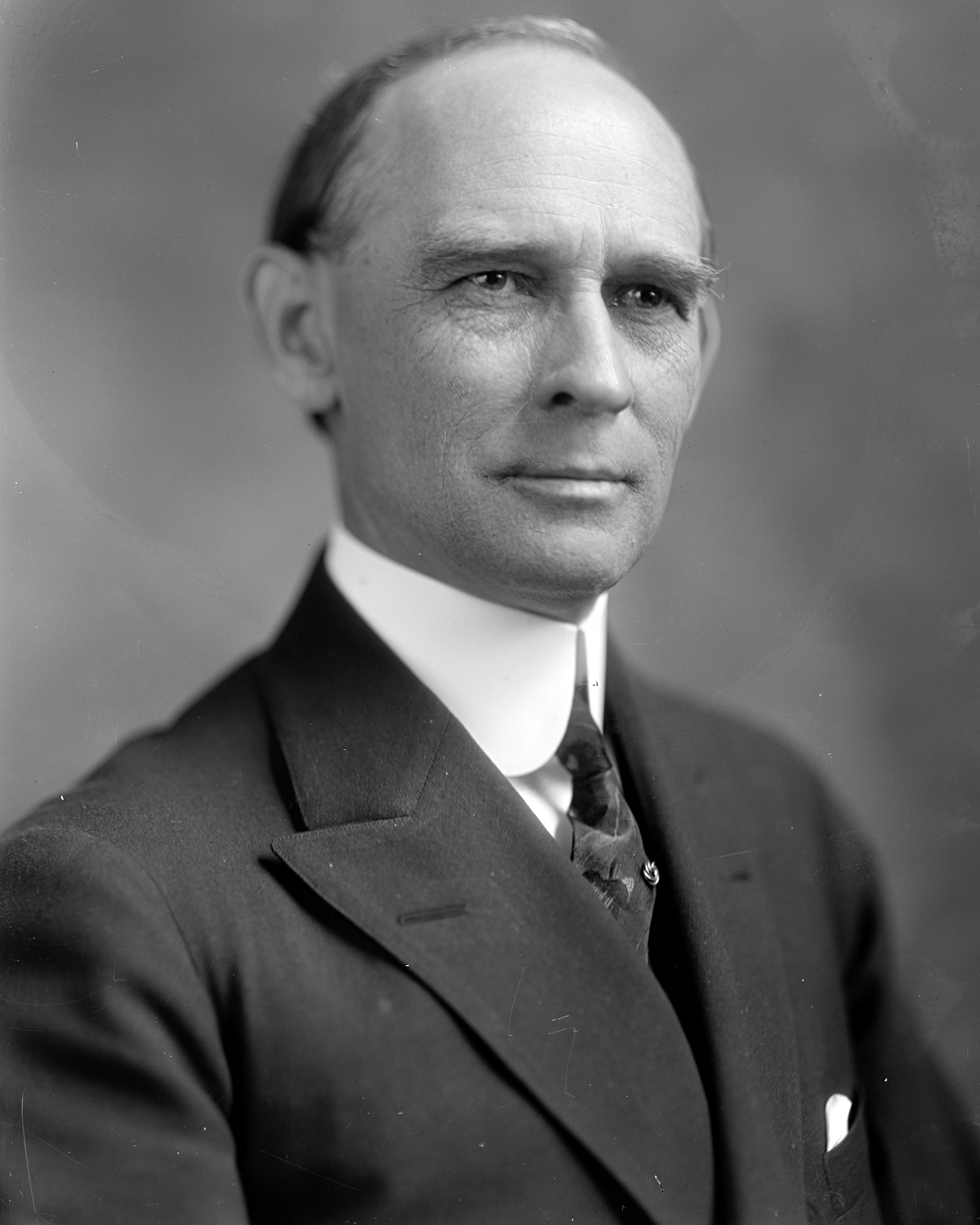

Member of the U.S. House of Representatives from Texas's 8th district
- In office March 4, 1913 – March 3, 1921
- Preceded by: John M. Moore
- Succeeded by: Daniel E. Garrett
- In office January 28, 1933 – January 3, 1937
- Preceded by: Daniel E. Garrett
- Succeeded by: Albert Thomas

Personal details
- Born: January 23, 1870 Tompkinsville, Kentucky
- Died: January 10, 1963 (aged 92) Houston, Texas
- Party: Democratic
- Education: Burritt College

Joe Henry Eagle (January 23, 1870 – January 10, 1963) was a U.S. representative from Texas.

Born in Tompkinsville, Kentucky, Eagle was graduated from the local high school in 1883 and obtained a teacher's certificate in 1884. He was also graduated from Burritt College in Spencer, Tennessee, in 1887. He moved to Texas. He taught school 1887-1893 and served as superintendent of the city schools of Vernon, Texas from 1889 to 1891. He studied law. He was admitted to the bar in 1893 and commenced practice in Wichita Falls, Texas. City attorney of Wichita Falls in 1894 and 1895. He moved to Houston in 1895 and continued the practice of law.

Eagle was elected as a Democrat to the Sixty-third and to the three succeeding Congresses (March 4, 1913 – March 3, 1921). He was not a candidate for renomination in 1920.

Eagle was elected on January 28, 1933, to both the Seventy-second and Seventy-third Congresses to fill the vacancies caused by the death of Daniel E. Garrett, who had been reelected in 1932. He was reelected to the Seventy-fourth Congress and served from January 28, 1933, to January 3, 1937. He was not a candidate for renomination in 1936, but was an unsuccessful candidate for the Democratic nomination for United States Senator. He resumed the practice of his profession. He was a resident of Houston, Texas, until his death January 10, 1963. He is interred in Forest Park (Lawndale) Cemetery.

== Sources ==
- United States Congress. "Joe H. Eagle (id: E000003)". Biographical Directory of the United States Congress.

U.S. House of Representatives
Preceded by John M. Moore	Member of the U.S. House of Representatives from Texas's 8th congressional district 1913-1921	Succeeded by Daniel E. Garrett
Preceded by Daniel E. Garrett	Member of the U.S. House of Representatives from Texas's 8th congressional district 1933-1937	Succeeded by Albert Thomas
