= Thomas H. Ball =

American politician (1859–1944)

Thomas Henry Ball
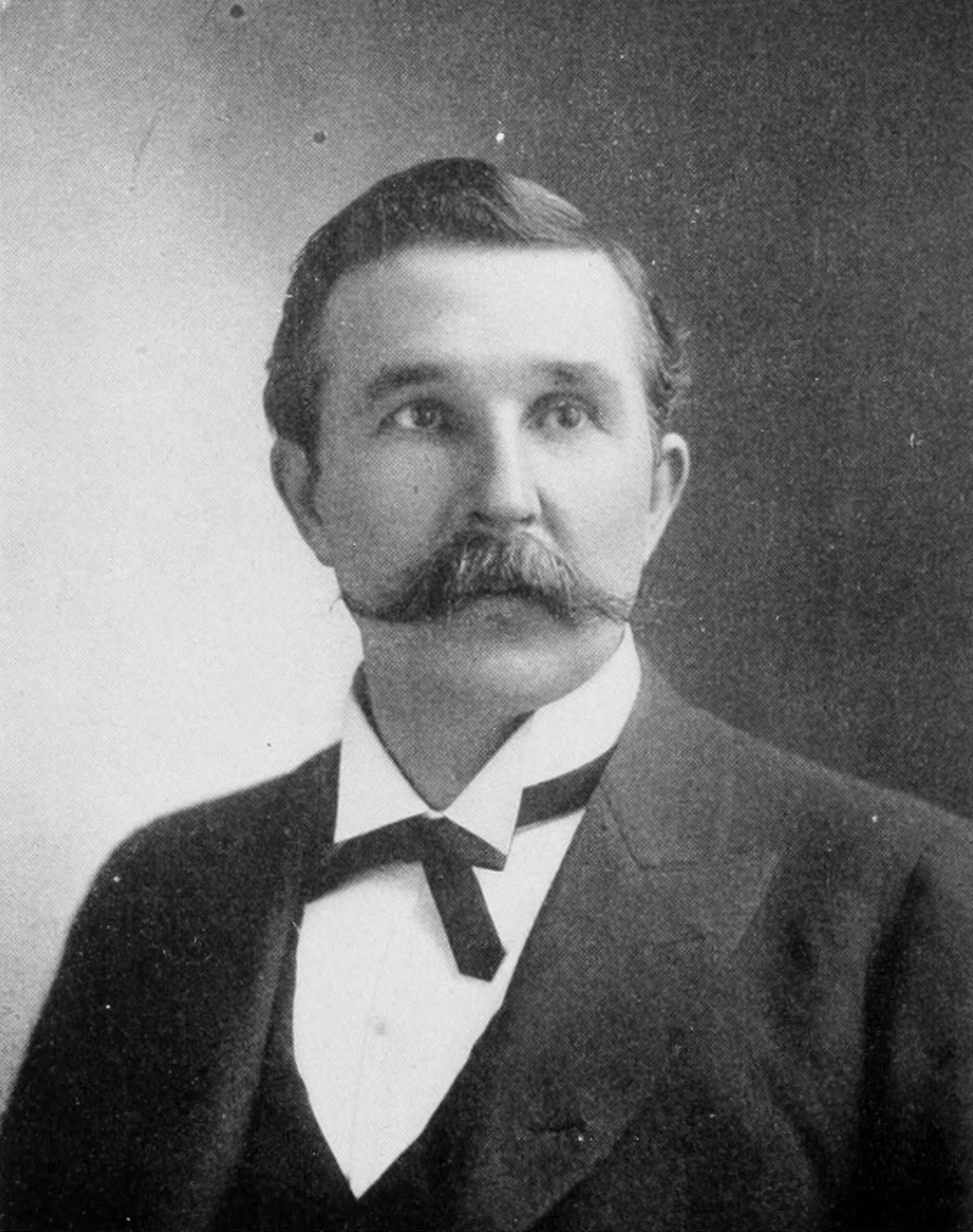

Member of the U.S. House of Representatives from Texas
- In office March 4, 1897 – November 16, 1903
- Preceded by: Joseph C. Hutcheson
- Succeeded by: John M. Pinckney
- Constituency: 1st district (1897–1903); 8th district (1903)

Personal details
- Born: January 14, 1859 Huntsville, Texas, US
- Died: May 7, 1944 (aged 85) Houston, Texas, US
- Resting place: Forest Park Lawndale Cemetery, Houston
- Party: Democratic
- Spouse: Minnie Thompson (m. 1882)
- Children: 6
- Education: Austin College; University of Virginia School of Law
- Profession: lawyer (admitted to bar 1886)

Thomas Henry Ball (January 14, 1859 – May 7, 1944) was a Texas politician and a Democratic member of the United States House of Representatives. He was mayor of Huntsville, Texas, from 1877 to 1892, and moved to Houston in 1902.

Thomas Henry Ball and Frank Andrews formed a law firm in Houston in 1902. Melvin Kurth joined in 1913. Andrews Kurth was important to Texas railroad firms early in the twentieth century. It represented Reconstruction Finance Corporation and Federal National Mortgage Corporation, New Deal agencies. In the early twenty-first century, Andrews Kurth had offices in London and Beijing, and employed more than 400 lawyers.

He held many posts in the Democratic Party of Texas, and unsuccessfully sought the 1914 nomination to be Governor of Texas on a prohibition platform, despite endorsements from President Woodrow Wilson and William Jennings Bryan. His Houston law practice represented chiefly railroads and corporations, and he promoted Texas port facilities both in Congress and after. He was general counsel for the Port Commission of Houston. He was a delegate at the 1892 Democratic National Convention, and in 1924 and 1928.

Because Ball had been instrumental in routing a railroad through Peck, Texas, the town was renamed Tomball, Texas, in his honor in 1907.

U.S. House of Representatives
Preceded by Joseph Chappell Hutcheson	Member of the U.S. House of Representatives from Texas's 1st congressional district March 4, 1897 – March 3, 1903	Succeeded by Morris Sheppard
Preceded by Samuel W.T. Lanham	Member of the U.S. House of Representatives from Texas's 8th congressional district March 4, 1903 – November 16, 1903	Succeeded by John M. Pinckney
