= Bob Eckhardt =

American politician (1913–2001)

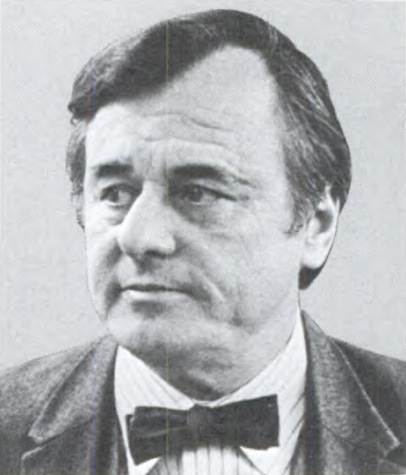

Member of the U.S. House of Representatives from Texas's 8th district
- In office January 3, 1967 – January 3, 1981
- Preceded by: Lera Millard Thomas
- Succeeded by: Jack Fields

Personal details
- Born: Robert Christian Eckhardt; July 16, 1913 Austin, Texas, U.S.
- Died: November 13, 2001 (aged 88) Austin, Texas, U.S.
- Party: Democratic
- Spouse(s): Orissa Stevenson; Nadine Cannon; Celia Morris
- Children: 3, including Sarah
- Relatives: Richard M. Kleberg (second cousin); Rudolph Kleberg (great-uncle)
- Education: University of Texas, Austin (BA, LLB)

Military service
- Allegiance: United States
- Branch/service: United States Army
- Years of service: 1943-1944

Robert Christian Eckhardt (July 16, 1913 – November 13, 2001) was an American author and Democratic politician who served as United States representative representing the 8th district of Texas from 1967 to 1981, and lawyer that practiced labor law.

== Early life and family ==
Eckhardt was born in Austin on July 16, 1913. He was the grand-nephew of Democratic Congressman Rudolph Kleberg, nephew of Republican Congressman Harry Wurzbach, and a cousin of Richard Mifflin Kleberg, Sr., heir to the famous King Ranch in South Texas. Eckhardt graduated from the University of Texas at Austin in 1935 and received his law degree from the University of Texas Law School in 1939. He served in the United States Army from 1942 to 1944. Eckhardt was appointed Southwestern Director of the Office of the Coordinator of Inter-American Affairs, 1944–1945.

== Political career ==
He moved to Houston and was elected a member of the Texas House of Representatives, serving from 1958 to 1966, where he compiled a fairly liberal voting record. One of Eckhardt's most enduring accomplishments in the Texas House was writing the Texas Open Beaches Act, passed in 1959.

In 1966, he was elected as a Democrat in Congress representing Texas's 8th congressional district, which included most of northern Houston. Eckhardt was the sponsor of the War Powers Act and the Toxic Substances Act. He was reelected six times without serious difficulty. In 1980, however, he was narrowly defeated by Jack Fields, losing by only 4,900 votes. He was also a co-founder of the Texas Observer magazine.

Eckhardt died on November 13, 2001, in Austin. He was interred in Austin Memorial Park Cemetery.

== Books authored ==
- Eckhardt, Bob. The Tides of Power: Conversations on the American Constitution between Bob Eckhardt, Member of Congress from Texas, and Charles L. Black Jr., Sterling Professor of Law, Yale University (New Haven: Yale University Press, 1976)

U.S. House of Representatives
Preceded by Lera Millard Thomas	Member of the U.S. House of Representatives from Texas's 8th congressional district 1967–1981	Succeeded by Jack Fields
