= John M. Pinckney =

American politician (1845–1905)

John Pinckney
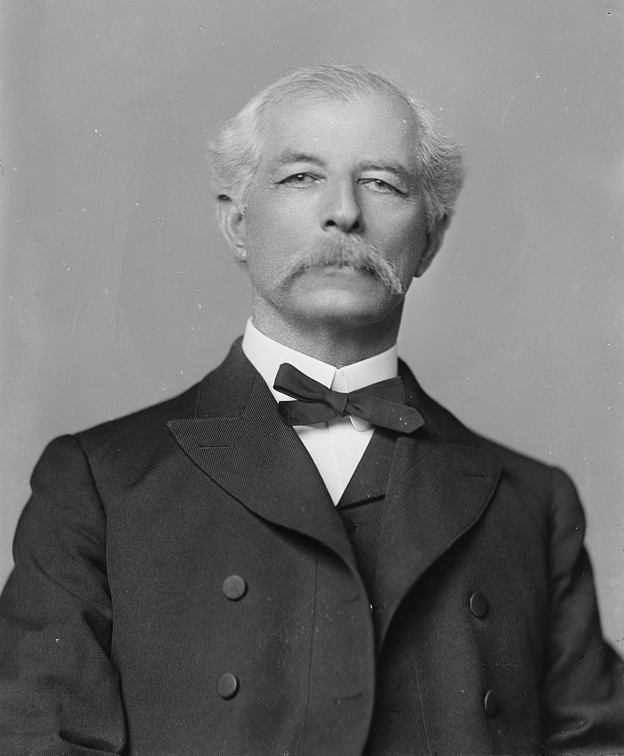

Member of the U.S. House of Representatives from Texas's 8th district
- In office November 17, 1903 – April 24, 1905
- Preceded by: Thomas Ball
- Succeeded by: John M. Moore

Personal details
- Born: John McPherson Pinckney; May 4, 1845 near Hempstead, Texas
- Died: April 24, 1905 (aged 59) Hempstead, Texas, U.S.
- Party: Democratic

John McPherson Pinckney (May 4, 1845 – April 24, 1905) was a United States representative from Texas who was shot and killed in Hempstead, Texas in 1905 while in office.

== Biography ==
John McPherson Pinckney was born near Hempstead in the Republic of Texas, he was raised on his family's farm near Fields Store. His father, Thomas Shubrick Pinckney, was crippled in a farming accident, leaving the young John to take on most of the work on the farm. His mother, Carolene (née Finney), died in 1861, leaving him the sole provider for his father and three siblings. None the less, Pinckney enlisted in Confederate States Army at age 16 and was attached with the 4th Texas Infantry in General John Bell Hood's Texas Brigade. After the end of the Civil War, he returned home and worked as a cotton weigher.

After being elected a justice of the peace, Pinckney decided to study law and was admitted to the bar in 1875, starting a practice in Hempstead. He was appointed district attorney for the twenty-third judicial district in 1890 which he served as for ten years until he was elected county judge of Waller County in 1900. Pinckney was then elected to the U.S. House of Representatives as a Democrat in a special election following the resignation of Thomas H. Ball in 1903. He was reelected to a full term in the House in 1904 and would serve in Congress until his death.

== Death ==
On April 24, 1905, a crowd of concerned citizens gathered in front of Waller County Courthouse in Hempstead to discuss a petition by the Prohibition League to Governor S. W. T. Lanham. The petition requested that Governor Lanham dispatch the Texas Rangers to enforce local prohibition ordinances, allowed under the state's local option law, due to insufficient enforcement by police and sheriffs. Tensions were high between "wets" (against prohibition) and "drys" (for prohibition) and supporters of both sides turned out for the gathering. Pinckney, who favored the petition, was first to speak and was routinely shouted down by opponents. Then J. N. Brown, a local lawyer and "wet" who was one of the people shouting at the congressman, pulled a pistol and began firing, as did his son Roland, and "drys" who were armed began firing back. Pinckney attempted to intervene to end the fight, but was shot in the back and killed when his brother Tom attempted to pull John away and protect him. Also killed were Tom Pinckney, J. N. Brown, and John Mills, a leader of the Prohibition League who succumbed to his wounds the next day. Pinckney's private secretary "Doc" Tompkins and Roland Brown were also shot, but survived. The entire gunfight lasted about thirty seconds and more than 75 bullets were found in the wall of the courthouse. Both John and Tom Pinckney were buried at Hempstead City Cemetery. Roland Brown was tried as an accomplice to the murders, but was acquitted when it was concluded that he had only taken out his pistol to protect his father. The identity of the assassin remains a mystery.

== See also ==
- List of assassinated American politicians
- List of members of the United States Congress who died in office (1900–1949)
- List of members of the United States Congress killed or wounded in office

== Sources ==
- United States Congress. "John M. Pinckney (id: P000356)". Biographical Directory of the United States Congress.
- John McPherson Pinckney, late a representative from Texas, Memorial addresses delivered in the House of Representatives and Senate frontispiece 1907

U.S. House of Representatives
Preceded by Thomas Ball	Member of the U.S. House of Representatives from Texas's 8th congressional district 1903–1905	Succeeded by John M. Moore
