= John Matthew Moore =

American politician (1862–1940)

John M. Moore
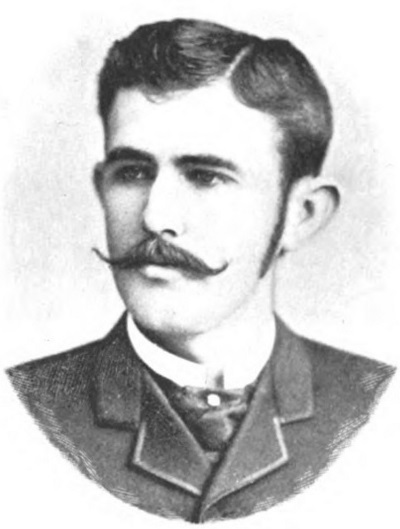

Member of the U.S. House of Representatives from Texas's 8th district
- In office June 6, 1905 – March 3, 1913
- Preceded by: John M. Pinckney
- Succeeded by: Joe H. Eagle

Member of the Texas House of Representatives from the 41st district
- In office January 12, 1897 – January 10, 1899
- Preceded by: Arthur C. Tompkins
- Succeeded by: Arthur C. Tompkins

Personal details
- Born: November 18, 1862 Richmond, Texas, C.S.
- Died: February 3, 1940 (aged 77) Fort Bend County, Texas, U.S.
- Party: Democratic
- Spouse: Lottie Dyer (m. 1883)
- Children: 6
- Education: State A&M College of Texas

John Matthew "Jaybird" Moore (November 18, 1862 – February 3, 1940) was an American rancher and statesman from Texas who served in the United States House of Representatives from District 8 from 1905 to 1913. He was engaged in Fort Bend County's Jaybird–Woodpecker War and affiliated with the Jaybirds. Moore was also present during the fighting at the Battle of Richmond on August 16, 1889.

== Early life and education ==
John Matthew Moore was born on November 18, 1862, in Richmond, Texas, during the American Civil War as the son of Dr. Matthew A. and Henrietta (née Huddlestone) Moore. His family owned a farm and many slaves near Oyster Creek. He was educated at the State A. and M. College of Texas in College Station, which is now Texas A&M University. He attended the college from 1878 to 1880.

== Career ==
E. H. Loughery wrote in 1897 that Moore was engaged in merchandising and farming from 1880 to 1883, and that Moore was primarily interested in stockraising, banking and farming in Richmond after 1883. He was Chairman of the Democratic Executive Committee of Fort Bend County in 1888, and from 1890 to 1892 Moore was the president of the Jaybird Democratic Association of Fort Bend County. Prior to being elected as a member of the Texas House of Representatives, he had been a delegate to several minor and state conventions.

During the Jaybird–Woodpecker War, a man was killed across the street from his home.

John Matthew Moore has often been confused for John Marks Moore, who was the Secretary of State of Texas during Lawrence Sullivan Ross's administration. John Matthew Moore has been erroneously claimed to have been a Secretary of State of Texas by the Fort Bend Herald and Texas Coaster, the Houston Chronicle, and the University of Texas at Austin.

== Personal life and legacy ==
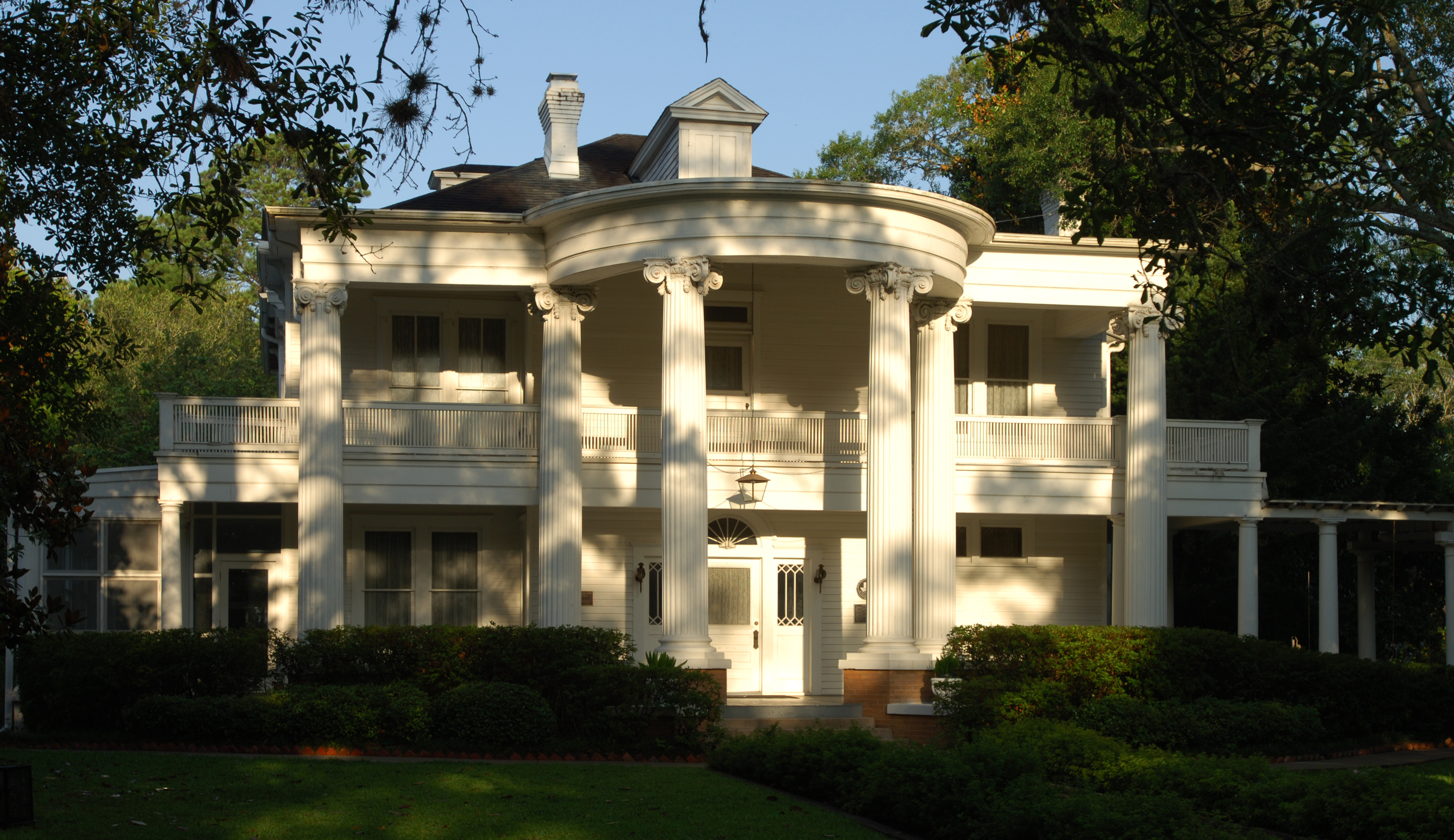
The John M. and Lottie D. Moore House in Richmond, Texas, currently serves as the Fort Bend Museum.

John Matthew Moore married Lottie Dyer, daughter of J. Foster Dyer, on July 30, 1883, in Nashville, Tennessee. J. Foster Dyer was a wealthy farmer and stockman of Fort Bend County. Mrs. Moore was an excellent musician and was educated in Virginia and at Baylor University at Waco. Moore was a member of Houston Lodge, No. 151 of the Benevolent and Protective Order of Elks. Moore's son, John Jr., served as a two-term Mayor of Richmond, Texas, and a two-term judge in Fort Bend County, Texas. John Jr.'s son, Hilmar, was the Mayor of Richmond, and the longest-serving elected official in the United States, having served 30 terms from 1949 until Moore's death on December 4, 2012.

== See also ==
- John M. and Lottie D. Moore House

Texas House of Representatives
Preceded by Arthur C. Tompkins	Member of the Texas House of Representatives from District 41 (Richmond); 1897–1899	Succeeded by Arthur C. Tompkins
U.S. House of Representatives
Preceded by John M. Pinckney	Member of the U.S. House of Representatives from Texas's 8th congressional district 1905–1913	Succeeded by Joe H. Eagle
