= Jack Fields =

American politician (born 1952)

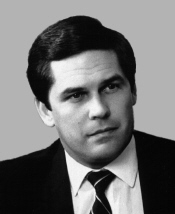

Member of the U.S. House of Representatives from Texas's 8th district
- In office January 3, 1981 – January 3, 1997
- Preceded by: Bob Eckhardt
- Succeeded by: Kevin Brady

Personal details
- Born: Jack Milton Fields Jr. February 3, 1952 (age 74) Humble, Texas, U.S.
- Party: Republican
- Education: Baylor University (BA, JD)

Jack Milton Fields Jr. (born February 3, 1952) is an American businessman and a former Republican member of the United States House of Representatives from a Houston-based district. He served eight terms from 1981 to 1997.

== Early life ==
Fields was born in Humble, a northern suburb of Houston. He graduated from Humble High School in his hometown in 1970. Fields earned both Bachelor of Arts and Juris Doctor degrees from Baptist-affiliated Baylor University and Baylor Law School in Waco, Texas, in 1974 and 1977, respectively. After being admitted to the Texas bar in 1977, Fields worked as a lawyer in private practice and as a vice president of a family-owned business through 1980.

== Congressional career ==
In 1980, at the age of twenty-eight, Fields was elected to the U.S. House on the coattails of President Ronald Reagan's electoral victory. He narrowly defeated 8th District incumbent Bob Eckhardt, a seven-term Democrat, by only 4,900 votes to become the first Republican to represent what is now the 8th in 83 years. After the 1980 census, most of the 8th's more Democratic areas were cut out, and Fields was reelected seven more times without serious difficulty.

When the Republican Party assumed majority control of the House of Representatives in the 1994 elections, Fields was elected chairman of the Subcommittee on Telecommunications and Finance of the House Committee on Commerce. In that role, he was one of the principal authors of the Private Securities Litigation Reform Act, the National Securities Markets Improvement Act of 1996, and the Telecommunications Act of 1996.

== 1993 special Senate election ==
In 1993, Fields joined a field of 24 candidates in a special election for the U.S. Senate seat vacated by Lloyd Bentsen, when Bentsen was appointed by U.S. President Bill Clinton as the secretary of the treasury. However, Fields failed to win enough votes to advance to a runoff election.

== Post-congressional career ==
Fields did not run for reelection to the 106th Congress in 1996. Instead, he started two companies, the 21st Century Group, Inc., a government relations firm based in Washington, D.C., and Texana Global, Inc., an international trade corporation headquartered in Texas. He has served on various corporate and charitable boards. In 2004, the U.S. Post Office in Kingwood was renamed the "Congressman Jack Fields Post Office" in Fields' honor.

He joined Insperity as a director in January 1997. His total compensation for this role in 2009 was $120,746.

Fields is married to Lynn Fields and has two daughters, Jordan and Lexi, and a stepson, Josh Hughes.

U.S. House of Representatives
Preceded by Bob Eckhardt	Member of the U.S. House of Representatives from Texas's 8th congressional district 1981–1997	Succeeded by Kevin Brady
Preceded by Bob Davis	Ranking Member of the House Merchant Marine and Fisheries Committee; 1993–1995	Position abolished
U.S. order of precedence (ceremonial)
Preceded by Jeff Miller as Former U.S. Representative	Order of precedence of the United States as Former U.S. Representative	Succeeded by Silvestre Reyes as Former U.S. Representative
