= Morgan Luttrell =

American politician (born 1975)

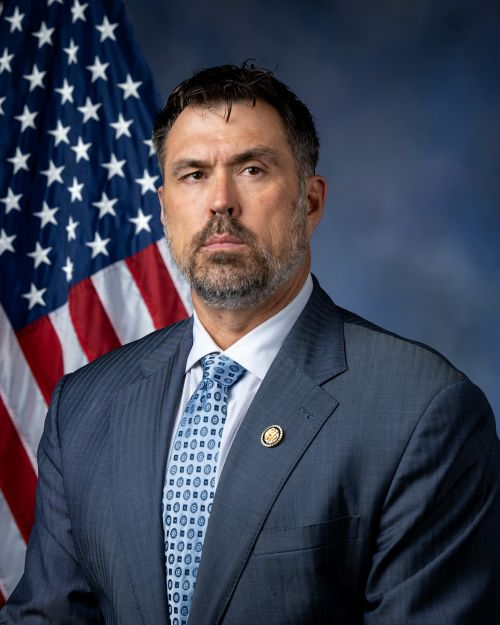
- Official portrait, 2025

Member of the U.S. House of Representatives from Texas's 8th district
- Incumbent
- Assumed office January 3, 2023
- Preceded by: Kevin Brady

Personal details
- Born: Morgan Joe Luttrell; November 7, 1975 (age 50) Houston, Texas, U.S.
- Party: Republican
- Spouse: Leslie
- Children: 2
- Relatives: Marcus (twin brother)
- Education: Sam Houston State University (BS); University of Texas, Dallas (MS)
- Website: House website Campaign website

Military service
- Branch/service: United States Navy
- Years of service: 2000–2014
- Rank: Lieutenant
- Unit: United States Navy SEALs; SEAL Team 7

Morgan Joe Luttrell (born November 7, 1975) is an American politician, businessman, and military veteran serving as the U.S. representative for Texas's 8th congressional district since 2023. He is a member of the Republican Party. On September 11, 2025, Luttrell announced he would not seek re-election in 2026.

== Early life and education ==
Born in Houston in 1975, Morgan Joe Luttrell has a twin brother, Marcus. He graduated from Willis High School. Luttrell earned a Bachelor of Science degree in psychology from Sam Houston State University in 2000 and a Master of Science in applied cognition neuroscience from the University of Texas at Dallas in 2016. He also has an executive certificate in professional leadership development from Harvard Business School.

== Early career ==
Luttrell is an adjunct professor at Sam Houston State University, of which he is an alumnus. He also teaches law enforcement leadership.

In 2019, Luttrell founded Trexxler Energy Solutions. He is also the founder of Stronos Industries, which provides recyclable and biodegradable campaign signs.

=== Military service ===
Luttrell served as a United States Navy SEAL. He volunteered and received orders for Basic Underwater Demolition/SEAL training (BUD/S) at Naval Amphibious Base Coronado in 2001. After months of training, Luttrell graduated from BUD/S class 237. After BUD/S, he completed advanced training courses including parachute training at Basic Airborne School, cold weather combat training in Kodiak, Alaska, and six months of SEAL Qualification Training (SQT) in Coronado, California. Luttrell received the Navy Enlisted Classification (NEC) 5326 as a Combatant Swimmer (SEAL), entitled to wear the Special Warfare Insignia. In 2007, he was commissioned as an Ensign after completing Officer Candidate School and received the 1130 designator as a Naval Special Warfare Officer. He served as a SEAL for 7 years until being medically retired in 2014 for a severe traumatic brain injury and spinal cord injury he sustained in a helicopter crash in 2009. Luttrell travelled to Rosarito, Mexico to obtain psychedelic therapy (ibogaine and 5-MeO-DMT) for his injuries, including "hyperaggression" in civilian life; he described the treatments as having "profound" results, with "it [being] like 20 years of therapy in three days."

=== Early political involvement ===
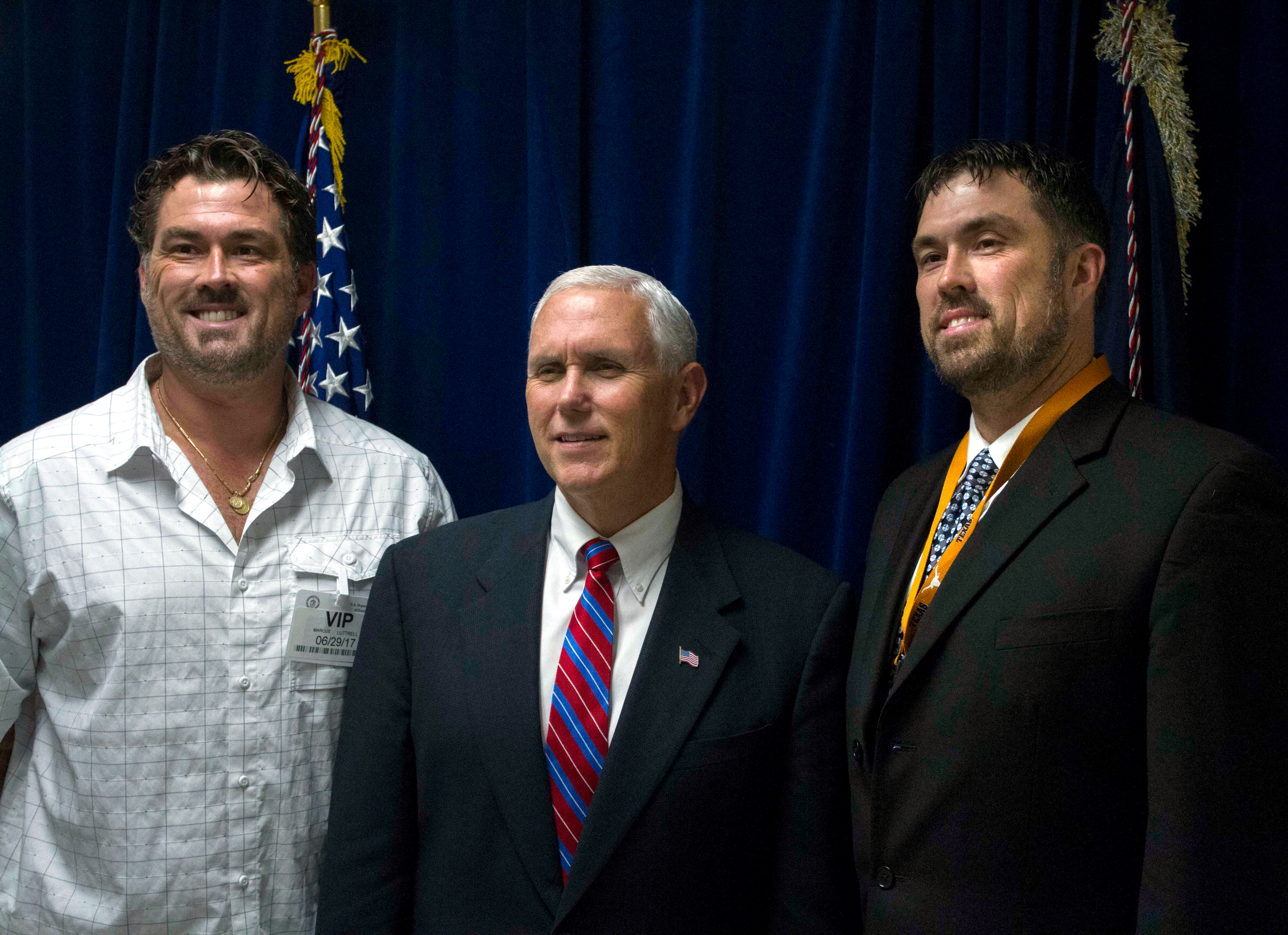
Morgan Luttrell (right) and Marcus Luttrell (left) with Vice President Mike Pence at the Unleashing American Energy Event

From 2017 to 2019, Luttrell was a senior advisor to Secretary Rick Perry in the United States Department of Energy. At the Energy Department, Luttrell worked to keep U.S. energy industry globally competitive through the Artificial Intelligence and Technologies Office.

== U.S. House of Representatives ==
=== Elections ===
==== 2022 ====
In 2021, Luttrell filed to run as a Republican for Texas's 8th congressional district in the 2022 election to succeed retiring incumbent Kevin Brady.

During his campaign, Luttrell was supported by Rick Perry, Congressman Dan Crenshaw (also a former Navy SEAL), House Minority Leader Kevin McCarthy, Texas Lieutenant Governor Dan Patrick, the Congressional Leadership Fund, and the American Patriots PAC, which was founded by McCarthy allies. He garnered some name recognition from his brother Marcus, a veteran and the author of the memoir Lone Survivor. In total, there were 11 candidates in the Republican primary, but Luttrell and Christian Collins, a conservative activist, were identified as the primary contenders since they both received significant political endorsements. Collins was supported by U.S. Senator Ted Cruz, the House Freedom action fund, and avid Trump supporters such as Marjorie Taylor Greene and Madison Cawthorn. The Texas Tribune described the race as "a tense proxy war, with some of the best-known Republicans in Texas—and the country—split between two of the leading candidates." Luttrell has expressed support for Trump, but he did request and receive campaign funds from a political PAC run by Adam Kinzinger, a major critic of Trump. Luttrell and Collins ran on similar issues—securing the border, gun rights, and restricting abortion—but Collins attempted to portray himself as the more pro-Trump candidate, accusing Luttrell of "lining up with the establishment". Donald Trump did not make an endorsement in the race.

Luttrell won the Republican primary with 52.2% of the vote, avoiding a runoff with Collins, who placed second with 22%. The Democratic nominee in the general election was Laura Jones, the former Democratic Party chair of San Jacinto County. Luttrell joined a lawsuit with several other congressional Republican candidates to remove Libertarian Party candidates, who are often perceived as threatening to Republican chances in tight elections, from the ballot. FiveThirtyEight rated Luttrell "very likely" to win the election. He was endorsed by the editorial board of the Houston Chronicle. On November 8, 2022, Luttrell defeated Jones in the general election by 68% to 31%.

==== 2024 ====
Luttrell was uncontested in the 2024 Republican primary, and he did again face Democratic nominee Laura Jones in the general election in which he was reelected.

=== Tenure ===
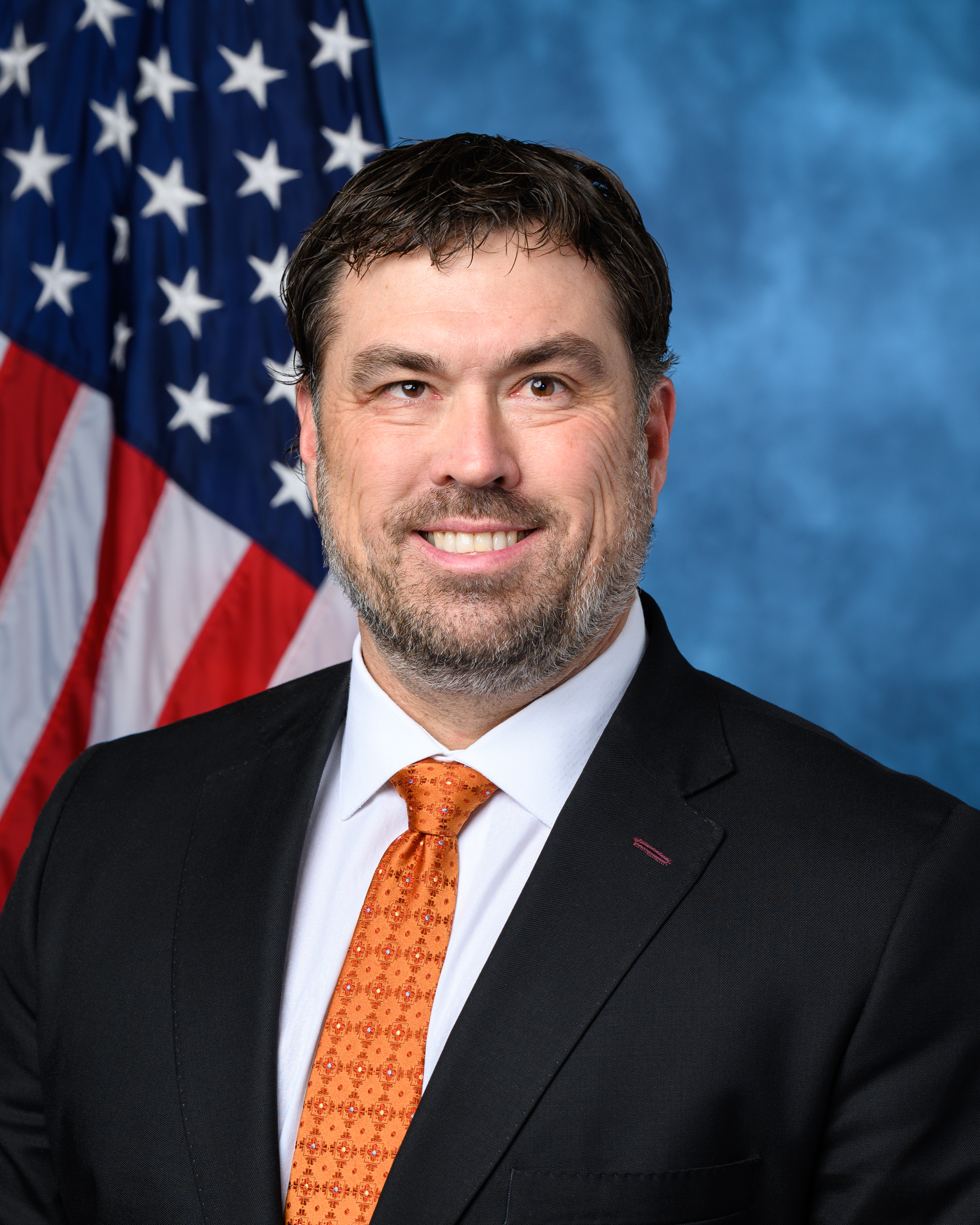
Luttrell in 2022

Luttrell assumed office on January 3, 2023 and was officially (Note: Members of the House of Representatives can not be sworn-in without a Speaker of the House.) sworn in following the election of Kevin McCarthy as Speaker of the House on January 7. Along with Joaquin Castro and Troy Nehls, Luttrell was one of three twins from Texas in the 118th United States Congress. Luttrell was assigned to the House Armed Services Committee, serving on the Subcommittee on Cyber, Innovative Technologies and Information Systems and the Subcommittee on Intelligence and Special Operations.

Luttrell was among the 71 Republicans who voted against final passage of the Fiscal Responsibility Act of 2023 in the House. He introduced an amendment, that was passed by the House, to a Department of Defense appropriations bill allocating $15 million to conduct clinical trials regarding the use of psychedelic therapy for veterans with traumatic brain injuries. In December 2023, Luttrell joined 13 of his colleagues in requesting an investigation into an attorney at the Office of General Counsel for the U.S. Department of Veteran Affairs over their alleged antisemitic comments.

On September 11, 2025, he announced that he was not going to run for reelection.

=== Caucus memberships ===
- Republican Main Street Partnership

== Electoral history ==
=== 2022 ===
==== Primary results ====
Republican primary results
Party	Candidate	Votes	%
Republican	Morgan Luttrell	34,271	52.2
Republican	Christian Collins	14,659	22.3
Republican	Jonathan Hullihan	8,296	12.6
Republican	Dan McKaughan	1,585	2.4
Republican	Jessica Wellington	1,550	2.4
Republican	Candice Burrows	1,519	2.3
Republican	Chuck Montgomery	1,169	1.8
Republican	Michael Philips	871	1.3
Republican	Jonathan Mitchell	791	1.2
Republican	Betsy Bates	712	1.1
Republican	Taylor Whichard	295	0.5
Total votes		65,718	100.0

==== General election results ====
Luttrell overwhelmingly won areas of Polk, San Jacinto, Walker, and Montgomery County within District 8 by 80%, 83%, 80%, and 82%, respectively, while narrowly losing the portion of Harris County within District 8 by a vote of 50%—48%.

Texas's 8th congressional district, 2022
Party	Candidate	Votes	%
Republican	Morgan Luttrell	152,797	68.09
Democratic	Laura Jones	68,485	30.52
Libertarian	Roy Eriksen	3,116	1.39
Total votes		224,398	100

=== 2024 ===
2024 Texas's 8th congressional district election
Party	Candidate	Votes	%
Republican	Morgan Luttrell (incumbent)	233,423	68.2
Democratic	Laura Jones	108,754	31.8
Total votes		342,177	100.0
Republican hold			

== Personal life ==
Luttrell and his wife Leslie have two sons. They live in Magnolia, Texas. Pew Research identified Luttrell as a Protestant, and he has described himself as a "practicing Christian."

== See also ==
- List of United States Navy SEALs

== Notes ==
U.S. House of Representatives
Preceded by Kevin Brady	Member of the U.S. House of Representatives from Texas's 8th congressional district 2023–present	Incumbent
U.S. order of precedence (ceremonial)
Preceded by Anna Paulina Luna	United States representatives by seniority 331st	Succeeded by Seth Magaziner
