= Kevin Brady =

American politician (born 1955)

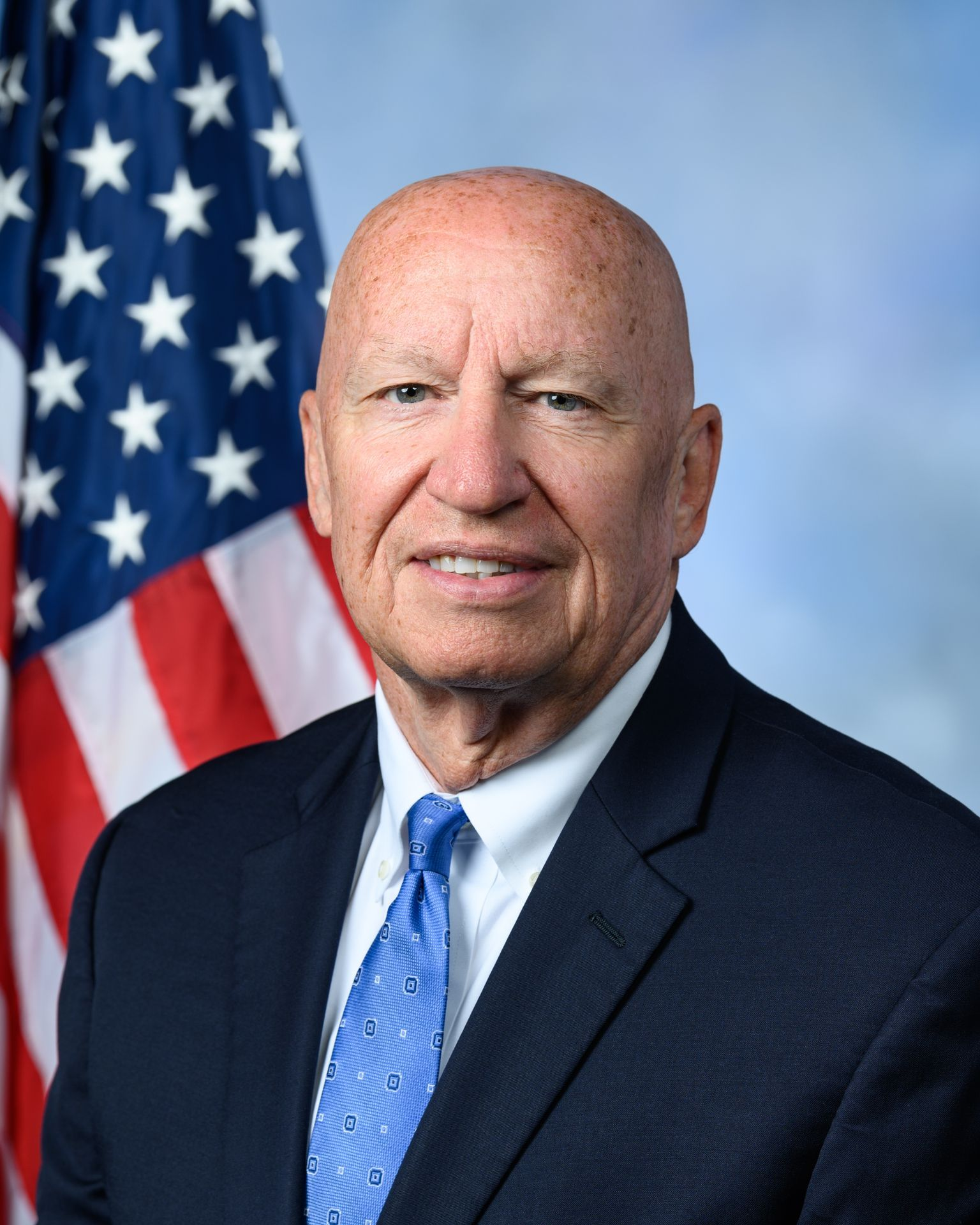

Ranking Member of the House Ways and Means Committee
- In office January 3, 2019 – January 3, 2023
- Preceded by: Richard Neal
- Succeeded by: Richard Neal

Chair of the House Ways and Means Committee
- In office November 5, 2015 – January 3, 2019
- Preceded by: Sam Johnson (acting)
- Succeeded by: Richard Neal

Member of the U.S. House of Representatives from Texas's 8th district
- In office January 3, 1997 – January 3, 2023
- Preceded by: Jack Fields
- Succeeded by: Morgan Luttrell

Member of the Texas House of Representatives from the 15th district
- In office January 10, 1991 – January 3, 1997
- Preceded by: Mike McKinney
- Succeeded by: Tommy Williams

Personal details
- Born: Kevin Patrick Brady; April 11, 1955 (age 71) Vermillion, South Dakota, U.S.
- Party: Republican
- Spouse: Cathy Patronella (m. 1991)
- Children: 2
- Education: University of South Dakota (BA)
- Brady's voice Brady opening a House Ways and Means Committee hearing on U.S. trade policy. Recorded June 22, 2017

Kevin Patrick Brady (born April 11, 1955) is an American politician who served as the U.S. representative for Texas's 8th congressional district from 1997 to 2023. He is a member of the Republican Party. The district included northern Houston, including The Woodlands.

== Early life, education, and early political career ==
Brady was born in Vermillion, South Dakota, one of five children of William F. and Nancy A. Brady. His father, a lawyer, was killed in 1967 in a courtroom shooting in Rapid City when Brady was 12 and his mother was in her early 30s. He graduated from Central High School in 1973. Brady has a degree in mass communications from the University of South Dakota in Vermillion.

Brady worked for the Rapid City area Chamber of Commerce. He was elected to the Rapid City common council at age 26. In 1982, he moved to Texas to work for the Beaumont, Texas Chamber of Commerce. In 1985, he went to work for the South Montgomery County Woodlands Chamber of Commerce.

== Texas House of Representatives ==
In 1990, Brady was elected to the Texas House of Representatives, district 15, representing The Woodlands, parts of Montgomery County, and five other counties west and north of Houston. He succeeded Mike McKinney as a representative of the 15th district in the Texas House of representatives on January 10, 1991.

== U.S. House of Representatives ==
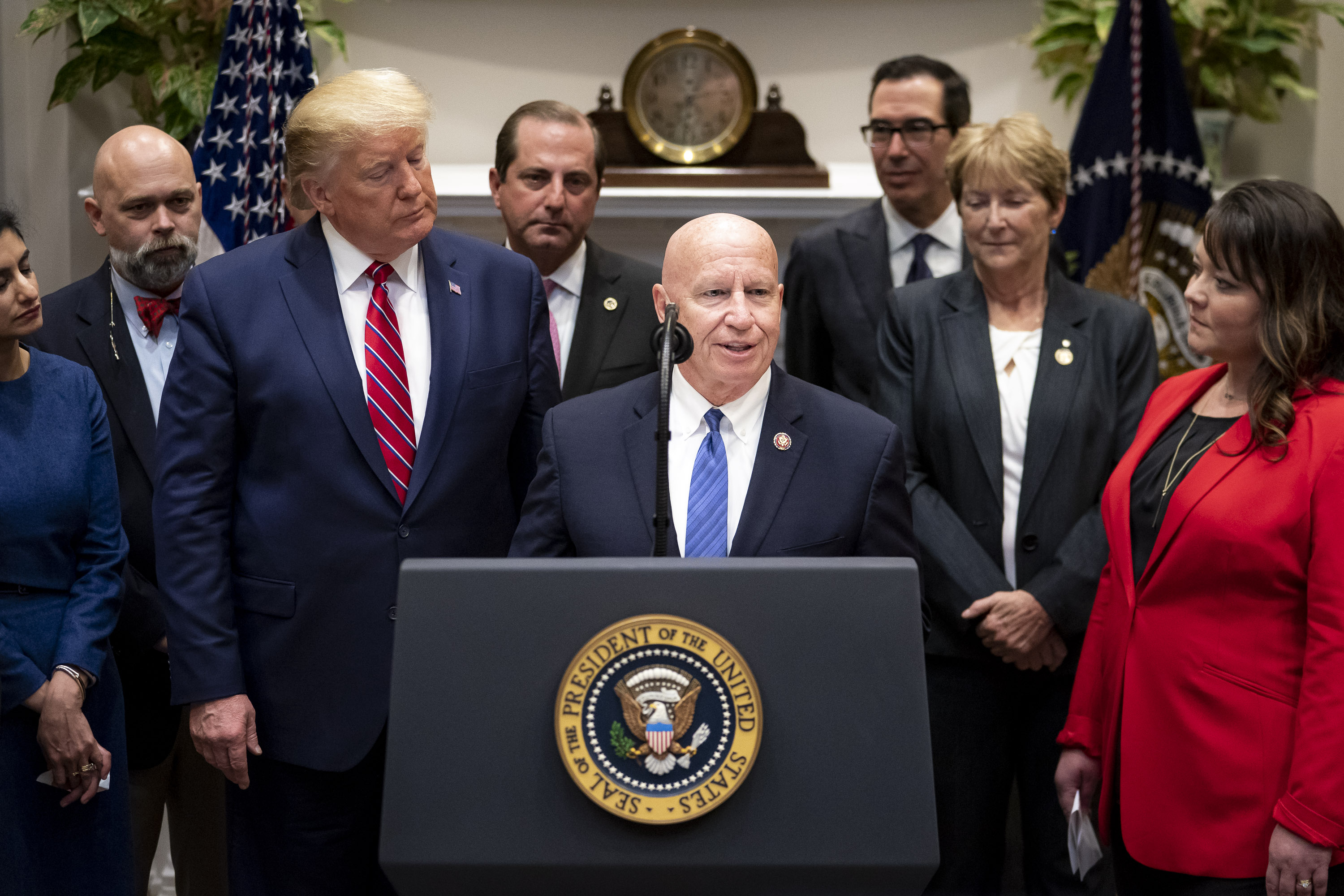
Brady speaks on healthcare in 2019

=== Elections ===
==== 1996 ====
Incumbent U.S. Representative Jack Fields of Texas's 8th congressional district decided to retire. Brady ran for the seat and ranked second in the Republican primary with 22% of the vote in a six-candidate field. The candidate who ranked first, Gene Fontenot, received 36% of the vote, short of the 50% threshold. In the runoff election, Brady defeated him, 53%–47%. But the Supreme Court of the United States ruled in Bush v. Vera that three of Texas's congressional districts were unconstitutional. After hearings, the court concluded that there was no longer time to hold primaries and instead forced all candidates (Democrats and Republicans) be listed together on the November general election ballot in a jungle primary. If no candidate reached 50%, a special runoff would be held on December 10 between the two highest-ranking candidates. In the November election, Brady ranked first with 41% of the vote. In the December runoff, he defeated Fontenot again, 59%–41%.

==== 1998–2008 ====
During this period, Brady never received less than 67% of the vote.

==== 2010 ====
For the first time since 1998, Brady was challenged in the Republican primary. Three candidates filed against him. He defeated all of them in the March primary with 79% of the vote. He was reelected with 80% of the vote.

==== 2012 ====
In the May Republican primary, in a newly redrawn district, he defeated his challenger with 76% of the vote. In the November 6 general election, he defeated the Democratic nominee with over 77% of the vote.

==== 2014 ====
Brady won the March 4 Republican primary with 41,549 votes (68%) to Craig McMichael's 19,508 (32%).

In the November 4 general election, Brady was reelected with 124,897 votes (89.32%) to Libertarian nominee Ken Petty's 14,930 (10.67%).

==== 2016 ====
In November 2015, Steve Toth, a former state representative from The Woodlands, Texas, announced that he would run against Brady.

Brady eked out a victory in the March 1 primary with 53% of the vote, his lowest total in his 18-year career. He spent over $1.5 million to Toth's $89,325. Toth criticized Brady for compromising too often with President Obama, for supporting the omnibus federal budget bill, and for voting to revive the U.S. Export-Import Bank.

==== 2018 ====
Brady won the Republican primary unopposed, as did the Democratic nominee, Steven David. Brady won the general election with 198,241 votes (73.5%) to David's 67,027 (24.8%). Libertarian Chris Duncan received 4,597 votes. As of September 30, 2018, Brady had outraised David in contributions, $4,899,672 to $31,664.

==== 2020 ====
Brady defeated Kirk Osborn in the Republican primary, 80.73% to 16.19%. In the general election, he defeated Democratic nominee Elizabeth Hernandez and Libertarian challenger Chris Duncan with 72.5% of the vote to the challengers' 27.5%. The 2020 election was Brady's last election for Congress.

=== Tenure ===
In 2002, Brady voted for the Authorization for the Use of Military Force Against Iraq, authorizing the U.S. invasion of Iraq the next year. Yet in 2008 he was one of the 24 Republicans (and 227 Democrats) to vote to impeach President George W. Bush for misleading the United States into going to war in Iraq.

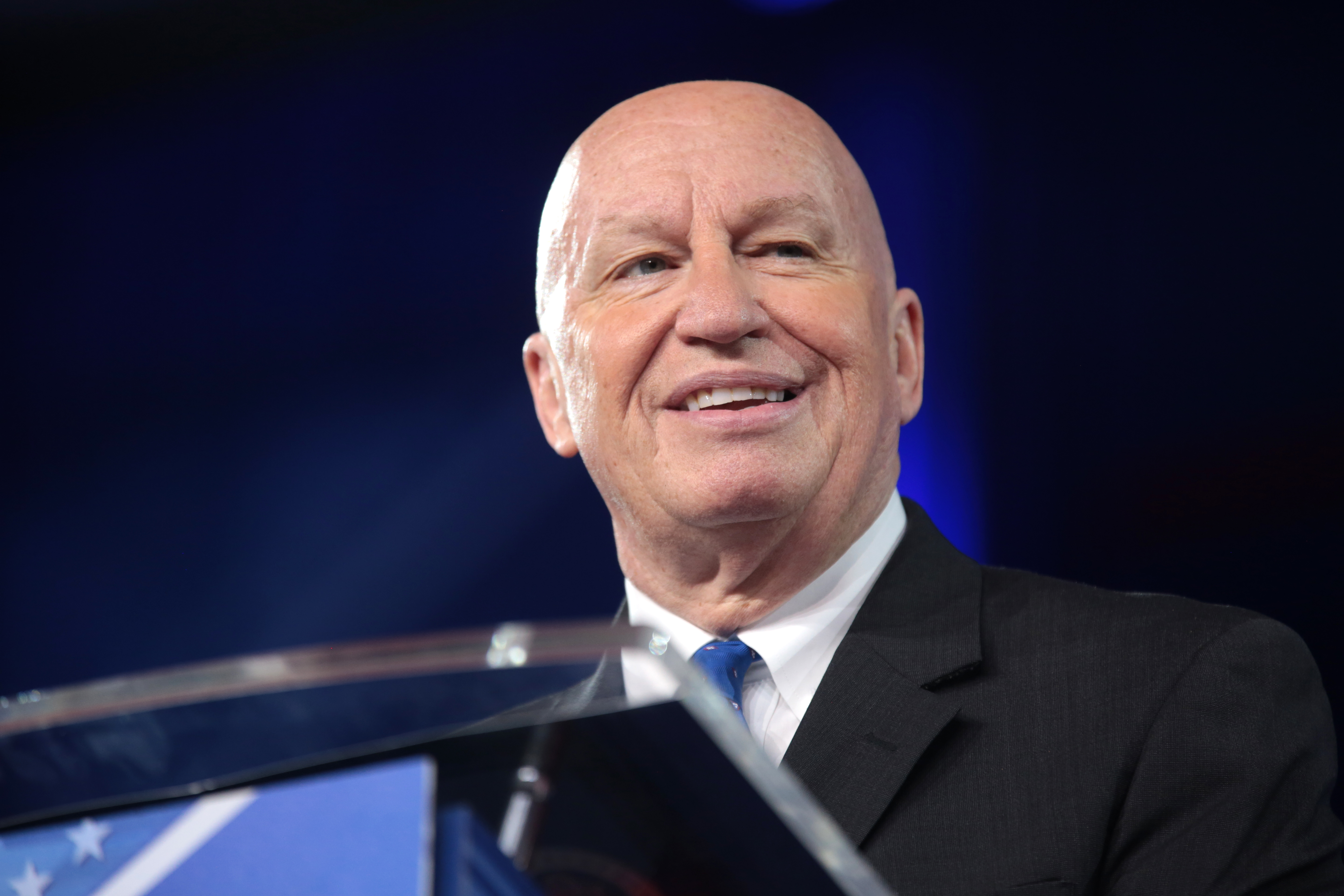
Brady in 2017

In 2005, Brady was a chief supporter of the Dominican Republic-Central America Free Trade Agreement (DR-CAFTA), working with the Bush administration to secure passage of that free-trade agreement. In 2011, Brady also voted for free-trade agreements with South Korea Colombia, and Panama. But in 2017, Brady supported President Donald Trump's proposed border adjustment tax, arguing that the tax on imports would place the U.S. on a level playing field with other countries that have the tax and raise an estimated $1 trillion.

Brady is known as the author of a federal "sunset law" that would require every federal program not specifically written into the Constitution to justify its existence to taxpayers within 12 years or face elimination.

In March 2012, Brady proposed the Sound Dollar Act, legislation to require the Federal Reserve to monitor gold and the foreign-exchange value of the U.S. dollar. The bill would also repeal the Federal Reserve's dual mandate (controlling unemployment and inflation) and replace it with a single mandate for U.S. dollar price stability.

In November 2015, Brady was elected the 65th chair of the Committee on Ways and Means, serving until 2019.

In March 2017, Brady introduced an amendment to the American Health Care Act (the House Republican proposal to repeal the Affordable Care Act) that would allow health insurance providers to fully deduct all forms of compensation to their most highly compensated executives without limit, repealing the current law, which capped the deduction at $500,000 per executive. Los Angeles Times columnist Michael Hiltzik criticized Brady's amendment as a "secret payoff" to the health insurance industry because of its cryptic language. On May 4, 2017 Brady joined in a raucous but premature victory celebration with other congressional Republican leaders and Donald Trump at the White House after the bill to repeal the Affordable Care Act passed in the House, though it would later be voted down in the Senate.

As chair of the House Committee on Ways and Means, Brady opposed a resolution to request ten years' worth of returns from Trump and his business entities. In 2017, he said the resolution was an abuse done for "obvious political purposes". In September 2020, after The New York Times published an extensive report on Trump's tax records and business dealings spanning two decades, Brady called for an investigation into the Times and the report's sources.

In November 2017, Brady said that the Tax Cuts and Jobs Act of 2017 would provide "tax relief at every level"; in fact, 7% of households in 2018 would pay more in taxes and by 2022, one quarter of households would pay more. Brady's claim that 70% of the tax cuts in the bill would go to households making below $200,000 was found to be "misleading" by FactCheck.Org and "cherry-picked" by PolitiFact. FactCheck.org noted that "57.7 percent of the tax relief goes to those families making less than $200,000 in 2019—not the 70 percent that Brady cited for 2019. By 2027, 50 percent of tax relief as a result of business and individual income tax changes would go to those making more than $200,000 a year." The American Conservative Union gave him a 94% evaluation in 2017.

Brady and Representative Richard Neal introduced the bipartisan SECURE Act of 2019, which contained a number of provisions to expand access to retirement planning options and to encourage employers to set up retirement plans for workers. The bill, originally introduced in March 2019, was passed into law in December 2019 as part of the fiscal year 2020 federal appropriations bill.

In December 2020, Brady indicated that he supported a second round of Paycheck Protection Program funds to assist small businesses suffering from the economic effects of the COVID-19 pandemic. He was a negotiator during the discussions to pass the Coronavirus Aid, Relief, and Economic Security Act.

In January 2021, after a mob of Trump supporters stormed the United States Capitol, Brady argued that those calling for Trump's impeachment or for the invocation of the 25th Amendment were themselves engaging in inflammatory language and that such calls could incite further violence.

On April 14, 2021, Brady announced that he would not run for a 14th House term and would retire in 2023.

=== Committee assignments ===
- Committee on Ways and Means

During his time in Congress, Brady chaired the Joint Economic Committee, the Ways and Means Committee, and the Joint Committee on Taxation.

=== Caucus memberships ===
- Army Caucus
- Congressional Missing and Exploited Children Caucus
- Congressional Rural Caucus
- United States Congressional International Conservation Caucus
- Sportsmen's Caucus
- Congressional Constitution Caucus
- Congressional Western Caucus
- Republican Study Committee

== Political positions ==
=== Taxation ===
Brady believes policies enacted by the first Trump administration, including the 2017 Tax Cuts and Jobs Act, helped put the U.S. economy in a robust position going into the COVID-19 pandemic.

=== Medicare ===
Brady strongly opposes Medicare for All.

=== Energy ===
In 2012, Brady voted for the Coal Miner Employment and Domestic Energy Infrastructure Protection Act, which rescinded Obama administration policies on coal mining and energy infrastructure. In January 2021, he expressed concern that the Biden administration's drilling ban Executive Order 13990 on federal leases would "kill" 120,000 Texas jobs.

=== LGBT rights ===
In 2011, Brady cosponsored legislation directing the Justice Department to continue defending the Defense of Marriage Act. He opposed Obergefell v. Hodges, the 2015 Supreme Court ruling that same-sex marriage bans are unconstitutional, citing his beliefs that marriage is "a union between one man and one woman" and that same-sex marriage law should be delegated to the states under the Tenth Amendment to the United States Constitution. In 2019, Brady voted against expressing opposition to banning service in the armed forces by openly transgender individuals, and in 2021, he voted against the Equality Act. The Human Rights Campaign gave Brady a score of 0 out of 100 for his voting record on legislation in the 116th Congress.

== Personal life ==
Brady lives in The Woodlands, a suburb of Houston, with his wife, Cathy, and two sons.

In October 2005, Brady was arrested and charged with driving under the influence of alcohol in South Dakota. He pleaded no contest, was convicted of a misdemeanor, and fined $350. Brady issued an apology.

U.S. House of Representatives
Preceded by Jack Fields	Member of the U.S. House of Representatives from Texas's 8th congressional district 1997–2023	Succeeded by Morgan Luttrell
Preceded by Bob Casey Jr.	Chair of the Joint Economic Committee; 2013–2015	Succeeded by Dan Coats
Preceded by Sam Johnson; Acting	Chair of the House Ways and Means Committee; 2015–2019	Succeeded by Richard Neal
Preceded by Sam Johnson; Acting	Chair of the Joint Taxation Committee; 2015–2016	Succeeded by Orrin Hatch
Preceded by Orrin Hatch	Chair of the Joint Taxation Committee; 2017–2018	Succeeded by Orrin Hatch
U.S. order of precedence (ceremonial)
Preceded by Mac Thornberry as Former U.S. Representative	Order of precedence of the United States as Former U.S. Representative	Succeeded by Ron Kind as Former U.S. Representative
