= James H. Davis (Texas politician) =

American politician

James Harvey "Cyclone" Davis
- Davis in 1914

Member of the U.S. House of Representatives from Texas's at-large district
- In office March 4, 1915 - March 3, 1917
- Preceded by: Daniel E. Garrett
- Succeeded by: Daniel E. Garrett

Personal details
- Born: December 24, 1853
- Died: January 31, 1940 (aged 86) Kaufman, Texas
- Resting place: Sulphur Springs, Texas
- Party: Democratic
- Other political affiliations: People's Party
- Spouse: Belle Barton

James Harvey "Cyclone" Davis (December 24, 1853 – January 31, 1940) was a People's Party (Populist) organizer and a Democratic U.S. Representative from Texas for one term from 1915–1917.

== Biography ==
=== Early life ===
Davis was born near Walhalla, South Carolina. He moved to Texas with his parents, William Barton and Salina (Moore) Davis, who settled in East Texas in Wood County near Winnsboro, in 1857. Davis attended the common schools and taught school from 1875 to 1878. He was able to study under the tutelage of attorney John D. Templeton during his sixteenth year. He strenuously applied his native talents to academics at night and soon qualified for a teaching certificate. He married Belle Barton, a distant cousin, on December 25, 1878. The couple had four children.

=== Populist and Democrat ===
He was elected judge of Franklin County, Texas in 1878 as a Democrat. At the time he was the youngest county judge in Texas. Subsequently, he studied law, was admitted to the bar in 1882 and commenced practice in Mount Vernon, Texas. Later, he engaged in the newspaper-publishing business, buying the Mount Vernon-Franklin Herald and was President of the Texas Press Association from 1886 to 1888.

Although he was a passable writer, his real talent lay in oratory. He campaigned for John Ireland, who was elected Governor in 1884, and Davis became a lecturer for the state Farmers' Alliance that same year. Davis became one of the foremost attractions on the alliance speakers' circuit through his verbal assaults upon such opponents as banks and corporations. During the 1880s he was tagged "Methodist Jim" for the fervency of his address. He was neither a Methodist nor a preacher, but a lifelong member of the Disciples of Christ.

When President Grover Cleveland blamed the Democratic party's support of the coinage of silver for his failure to win the presidency in 1888, Davis left the party. He also sold the Franklin Herald and in 1889 founded the Sulphur Springs Alliance Vindicator. He campaigned for Democrat Jim Hogg in his gubernatorial bid in 1890 because the Farmers' Alliance endorsed him. Thereafter, Davis cast his fortunes with the People's Party (commonly known as the Populists). He was one of only five lawyers to participate in the founding convention of the People's party in Cincinnati in 1892, where he served on both the executive and platform committees.

He received the nickname "Cyclone" from an 1894 debate with Kentucky Attorney General Watt Hardin. According to an Associated Press reporter, Davis so demolished his opponent that only one sweep of the "Texas Cyclone" was sufficient cause for Hardin to cancel the remaining scheduled debates.

Cyclone Davis was an unsuccessful Populist candidate for Attorney General of Texas in 1892 and he was influential in the formation of the People's Party, serving as organizer and committeeman from 1892 to 1900. He ran for Congress as a Populist candidate for election in 1894, but he was defeated. He declined the appointment as Superintendent of Agriculture for the Philippines in 1914. He was elected as a Democrat to the 64th United States Congress (1915–1917) defeating incumbent Democrat Daniel E. Garrett of Houston.

=== Out of office ===
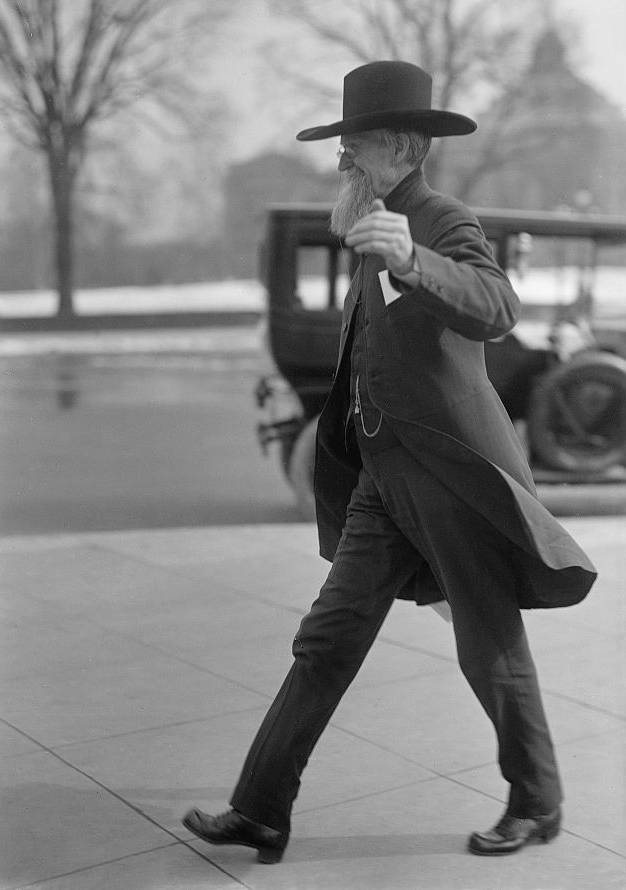
"Cyclone" Davis was a one-term Congressman elected as a Democrat.

Garrett returned the favor two years later and defeated Davis in a rematch. Davis returned to his home in Sulphur Springs and engaged in Chautauqua work and prohibition work after 1916. He joined the second Ku Klux Klan in his later years. In 1932 he came out of political retirement to oppose Joseph W. Bailey, Jr., for congressman-at-large in the Democratic primaries. The elder Joseph W. Bailey had been a vehement foe of Populism in the 1890s. Davis lost in the runoff primary. He legally changed his name to "James Harvey Cyclone Davis" in 1932. He remarried Maude V. Woods in 1935, after his first wife died, and moved to Kaufman, Texas, where he died on January 31, 1940. Cyclone Davis was buried in the City Cemetery of Sulphur Springs, Texas.

Davis' son Arlon Barton "Cyclone" Davis was a perennial candidate for office and ran in the Democratic Party primary of the 1948 United States Senate election in Texas, receiving nearly one percent of the vote.

In 1964, Jim Ranchino, later a political scientist and a political consultant in Arkansas, wrote the Master of Arts thesis at Texas Christian University entitled The Work and Thought of a Jeffersonian in the Populist Movement: James Harvey 'Cyclone' Davis.

== Footnotes ==
U.S. House of Representatives
| Preceded by Daniel E. Garrett | Member of the U.S. House of Representatives from Texas's at-large congressional seat 1915-1917 | Succeeded by Daniel E. Garrett |
