= Texas's 8th congressional district =

U.S. House district for Texas

Coordinates: 30°50′00″N 95°32′37″W

- Interactive map of district boundaries
- Representative: Morgan Luttrell; R–Magnolia
- Distribution: 67.55% urban; 32.45% rural
- Population (2025): 968,403
- Median household income: $94,156
- Ethnicity: 45.1% White; 32.5% Hispanic; 12.4% Black; 5.8% Asian; 3.3% Two or more races; 0.9% other
- Cook PVI: R+16

Texas's 8th congressional district of the United States House of Representatives includes all of Polk and San Jacinto counties, and parts of Harris, Walker, and Montgomery counties. It includes much of the northern outlying areas of metro Houston, including Conroe, Magnolia, and most of Lake Livingston. The current Representative from the 8th district is Morgan Luttrell and has been since 2023.

== District history ==
Texas received an eighth congressional district through reapportionment in 1881 as a result of population growth reflected in the 1880 census and in 1883, James Francis Miller, a Democrat, was elected its first representative. From 1882-1892 the district was located in South Central Texas between Houston and San Antonio and was represented by Democrats. After 1893, the district was located in North Texas and was represented by a Republican representative from Fort Worth and then a Democrat from Weatherford. After the redistricting of 1902, the district shifted to Southeast Texas and the area outside of Houston and was represented by Congressmen from Huntsville, Hempstead and Richmond. From 1910-1959, the 8th district comprised all of Harris County and the city of Houston.

In 1958, part of southern Harris County became the 22nd district. The 8th and 22nd districts were separated by a boundary consisting roughly of what is now U.S. 290, the western and southern portions of Loop 610, and the portion of Buffalo Bayou east of downtown Houston including the Houston Ship Channel. Everything north of this boundary remained in the 8th.

The district was redrawn mid-decade in 1966 after the Supreme Court ruled in Wesberry v. Sanders two years earlier that congressional district populations had to be equal or close to equal in population. As a result, Houston was split between the 7th, 8th, 9th and 22nd districts. For the next 17 years, the 8th was anchored by northern Houston.

By the 1970s, the 8th district was beginning to move away from its traditional Democratic roots, and in 1980 it elected a Republican congressman, Jack Fields, over liberal seven-term incumbent Bob Eckhardt. After the 1980 census, the 8th district was pushed further north to include conservative areas of northern Harris County (such as Fields' home in Humble) as well as the wealthier portions of Montgomery County, The 8th district's borders changed drastically in the 1990s round of redistricting, which was orchestrated by the Democratic-controlled state legislature as well as then-Congressman Martin Frost, the senior Democrat in the congressional delegation. The new 8th district was designed to pack in as many Republicans as possible and was described by some critics as the "dumbbell district" because of its strange shape. The western half of the district contained parts of Waller, Austin, and Washington counties, as well as much of Brazos County, which is home to the conservative bastion Texas A&M University. The eastern half of the district took in nearly all of now-heavily Republican Montgomery County, as well as Republican areas in northern Harris County. The two halves were joined together by a narrow tendril in Waller County. Fields continued to represent the district until his retirement in 1996, when he was succeeded by fellow Republican Kevin Brady.

The 8th district was made somewhat more compact after the 2000 census, taking in nearly all of Montgomery County and most of northern Harris County. However, it changed dramatically during the 2003 redistricting plan engineered by then-House Majority Leader Tom DeLay, a Republican from Texas's 22nd district. DeLay wanted to dislodge 4-term Democratic Congressman Jim Turner from the neighboring 2nd district, who represented a district located in East Texas that was predominantly rural and had begun moving away from its Democratic roots (Bush received 63% of the vote there in 2000). Brady's 8th district lost most of its share of Houston, instead absorbing nearly all of the southern portion of the old 2nd district. Although geographically the new 8th was more Turner's district than Brady's, half its population came from Brady's base in Montgomery County, which has as many people as the rest of the district combined. The new 8th district was so heavily Republican (Bush would have carried it in 2000 with 69% of the vote) that Turner declined to run for reelection. Brady has been reelected from this district four times with only nominal opposition. In 2020, Brady fended off a primary challenge and won re-election against Democrat Elizabeth Hernandez and Libertarian Chris Duncan with 72.5% of the vote.

Due to redistricting in 2012, Texas's 8th district lost its entire eastern half, with Orange, Newton, Jasper, Tyler, Hardin, Polk, and Liberty counties being removed from the district. Counties added include all of Trinity, Houston, Grimes, Madison, and the southern half of Leon County.

in 2022, Kevin Brady, who eventually rose to become Chairman of the influential House Ways and Means Committee (where he notably shepherded the Tax Cuts and Jobs Act of 2017), announced his retirement from Congress. At the same time, Brady's hometown of The Woodlands was redrawn into the 2nd District of neighboring Republican Dan Crenshaw, while the 8th was redrawn to now cover all areas of Montgomery County north of The Woodlands along with southern portions of Walker County, all of San Jacinto and Polk counties (including Lake Livingston) and a western section of Harris County that includes a sizable number of middle-class Hispanics with neighborhoods that vary in composure from heavily Republican to heavily Democratic (including some that were central to the Democrats' pickup of the traditionally Republican 7th District in the 2018 elections). The new district remains heavily Republican, even though the Harris County portion is considered more competitive than the overwhelmingly Republican remainder of the district.

On March 1, 2022 the Texas Republican primary was held. Morgan Luttrell won the primary with 52.2% of the vote against 11 different challengers. Christian Collins held 2nd at 22.2% and Jonathan Hullihan in 3rd with 12.6%. Luttrell defeated Democratic nominee Laura Jones on November 8, 2022.

== Current composition ==
For the 118th and successive Congresses (based on redistricting following the 2020 census), the district contains all or portions of the following counties and communities:

Harris County (3)

Houston (part; also 2nd, 7th, 9th, 18th, 22nd, 29th, 36th, 38th; shared with Fort Bend and Montgomery counties), Katy (part; also 10th and 22nd; shared with Fort Bend and Waller counties), Waller (part; also 10th; shared with Waller County)

Montgomery County (10)

Conroe (part; also 2nd), Cut and Shoot, Grangerland (part; also 2nd), Magnolia, Montgomery, Panorama Village, Pinehurst, Stagecoach, Willis, The Woodlands (part; also 2nd; shared with Harris County)

Polk County (10)

All 10 communities

San Jacinto County (6)

All 6 communities

Walker County (2)

Huntsville (part; also 17th), New Waverly

== Future composition ==
Beginning with the 2026 election, the 8th district will consist of the following counties:

- Harris (part)
- Montgomery (part)
- Walker (part)
- Waller

== List of members representing the district ==
District borders are periodically redrawn and some district residences may no longer be in the 8th district.

Member	Party	Term	Cong ess	Electoral history
District established March 4, 1883
James Francis Miller (Gonzales)	Democratic	March 4, 1883 – March 3, 1887	48th 49th	Elected in 1882. Re-elected in 1884. Renominated but retired.
Littleton W. Moore (La Grange)	Democratic	March 4, 1887 – March 3, 1893	50th 51st 52nd	Elected in 1886. Re-elected in 1888. Re-elected in 1890. [data missing]
Charles K. Bell (Fort Worth)	Democratic	March 4, 1893 – March 3, 1897	53rd 54th	Elected in 1892. Re-elected in 1894. [data missing]
Samuel W.T. Lanham (Weatherford)	Democratic	March 4, 1897 – January 15, 1903	55th 56th 57th	Elected in 1896. Re-elected in 1898. Re-elected in 1900. Resigned to become Governor of Texas.
Vacant		January 15, 1903 – March 3, 1903	57th	
Thomas Henry Ball (Huntsville)	Democratic	March 4, 1903 – November 16, 1903	58th	Redistricted from the 1st district and re-elected in 1902. Resigned.
Vacant		November 16, 1903 – November 17, 1903	58th	
John M. Pinckney (Hempstead)	Democratic	November 17, 1903 – April 24, 1905	58th 59th	Elected to finish Ball's term. Re-elected in 1904. Assassinated.
Vacant		April 24, 1905 – June 6, 1905	59th	
John M. Moore (Richmond)	Democratic	June 6, 1905 – March 3, 1913	59th 60th 61st 62nd	Elected to finish Pinckney's term. Re-elected in 1906. Re-elected in 1908. Re-elected in 1910. [data missing]
Joe H. Eagle (Houston)	Democratic	March 4, 1913 – March 3, 1921	63rd 64th 65th 66th	Elected in 1912. Re-elected in 1914. Re-elected in 1916. Re-elected in 1918. [data missing]
Daniel E. Garrett (Houston)	Democratic	March 4, 1921 – December 13, 1932	67th 68th 69th 70th 71st 72nd	Elected in 1920. Re-elected in 1922. Re-elected in 1924. Re-elected in 1926. Re-elected in 1928. Re-elected in 1930. Re-elected in 1932. Died.
Vacant		December 13, 1932 – January 28, 1933	72nd	
Joe H. Eagle (Houston)	Democratic	January 28, 1933 – January 3, 1937	72nd 73rd 74th	Elected to finish Garrett's term. Re-elected in 1934. [data missing]
Albert Thomas (Houston)	Democratic	January 3, 1937 – February 15, 1966	75th 76th 77th 78th 79th 80th 81st 82nd 83rd 84th 85th 86th 87th 88th 89th	Elected in 1936. Re-elected in 1938. Re-elected in 1940. Re-elected in 1942. Re-elected in 1944. Re-elected in 1946. Re-elected in 1948. Re-elected in 1950. Re-elected in 1952. Re-elected in 1954. Re-elected in 1956. Re-elected in 1958. Re-elected in 1960. Re-elected in 1962. Re-elected in 1964. Died.
Vacant		February 15, 1966 – March 26, 1966	89th	
Lera Millard Thomas (Houston)	Democratic	March 26, 1966 – January 3, 1967	89th	Elected to finish her husband's term. Retired.
Bob Eckhardt (Houston)	Democratic	January 3, 1967 – January 3, 1981	90th 91st 92nd 93rd 94th 95th 96th	Elected in 1966. Re-elected in 1968. Re-elected in 1970. Re-elected in 1972. Re-elected in 1974. Re-elected in 1976. Re-elected in 1978. Lost re-election.
Jack Fields (Humble)	Republican	January 3, 1981 – January 3, 1997	97th 98th 99th 100th 101st 102nd 103rd 104th	Elected in 1980. Re-elected in 1982. Re-elected in 1984. Re-elected in 1986. Re-elected in 1988. Re-elected in 1990. Re-elected in 1992. Re-elected in 1994. Retired.
Kevin Brady (The Woodlands)	Republican	January 3, 1997 – January 3, 2023	105th 106th 107th 108th 109th 110th 111th 112th 113th 114th 115th 116th 117th	Elected in 1996. Re-elected in 1998. Re-elected in 2000. Re-elected in 2002. Re-elected in 2004. Re-elected in 2006. Re-elected in 2008. Re-elected in 2010. Re-elected in 2012. Re-elected in 2014. Re-elected in 2016. Re-elected in 2018. Re-elected in 2020. Redistricted to the 2nd district and retired.
Morgan Luttrell (Magnolia)	Republican	January 3, 2023 – present	118th 119th	Elected in 2022. Re-elected in 2024. Retiring at the end of term.
Jessica Steinmann (The Woodlands)	Republican	Assuming office on January 3, 2027	120th	Elected in 2026.

== Recent election results from statewide races ==
=== 2023–2027 boundaries ===
Year	Office	Results
2008	President	McCain 67% - 32%
2012	President	Romney 72% - 28%
2014	Senate	Cornyn 76% - 24%
2014	Governor	Abbott 73% - 27%
2016	President	Trump 64% - 32%
2018	Senate	Cruz 63% - 37%
2018	Governor	Abbott 66% - 33%
2018	Lt. Governor	Patrick 63% - 35%
2018	Attorney General	Paxton 62% - 36%
2018	Comptroller of Public Accounts	Hegar 64% - 33%
2020	President	Trump 63% - 36%
2020	Senate	Cornyn 64% - 34%
2022	Governor	Abbott 67% - 32%
2022	Lt. Governor	Patrick 66% - 32%
2022	Attorney General	Paxton 66% - 32%
2022	Comptroller of Public Accounts	Hegar 68% - 30%
2024	President	Trump 66% - 32%
2024	Senate	Cruz 63% - 35%

=== 2027–2033 boundaries ===
Year	Office	Results
2008	President	McCain 61% - 38%
2012	President	Romney 64% - 36%
2014	Senate	Cornyn 72% - 28%
2014	Governor	Abbott 69% - 31%
2016	President	Trump 58% - 38%
2018	Senate	Cruz 57% - 42%
2018	Governor	Abbott 61% - 38%
2018	Lt. Governor	Patrick 58% - 40%
2018	Attorney General	Paxton 57% - 41%
2018	Comptroller of Public Accounts	Hegar 59% - 38%
2020	President	Trump 59% - 40%
2020	Senate	Cornyn 59% - 38%
2022	Governor	Abbott 63% - 35%
2022	Lt. Governor	Patrick 63% - 35%
2022	Attorney General	Paxton 63% - 35%
2022	Comptroller of Public Accounts	Hegar 65% - 33%
2024	President	Trump 63% - 36%
2024	Senate	Cruz 60% - 38%
2026	Senate	Paxton 49% - 48%
2026	Governor	Abbott 52% - 47%

== Election results ==
United States House of Representatives elections in Texas, 2026: District 8
Party	Candidate	Votes	%
Republican	Jessica Hart Steinmann	141,786	53.2
Democratic	Laura Jones	124,680	46.8
Total votes		266,466	100.0
Republican hold			

United States House of Representatives elections in Texas, 2024: District 8
Party	Candidate	Votes	%
Republican	Morgan Luttrell (incumbent)	233,423	68.2
Democratic	Laura Jones	108,754	31.8
Total votes		342,177	100.0
Republican hold			

United States House of Representatives elections in Texas, 2022: District 8
Party	Candidate	Votes	%
Republican	Morgan Luttrell	152,797	68.09
Democratic	Laura Jones	68,485	30.52
Libertarian	Roy Eriksen	3,116	1.39
Total votes		224,398	100

United States House of Representatives elections in Texas, 2020: District 8
Party	Candidate	Votes	%
Republican	Kevin Brady (incumbent)	277,327	72.5
Democratic	Elizabeth Hernandez	97,409	25.5
Libertarian	Chris Duncan	7,735	2.0
Total votes		382,471	100.0
Republican hold			

United States House of Representatives elections in Texas, 2018: District 8
Party	Candidate	Votes	%	±%
Republican	Kevin Brady (incumbent)	200,619	73.44	−26.56
Democratic	Steven David	67,930	24.87	+24.87
Libertarian	Chris Duncan	4,621	1.69	+1.69
Majority		132,689	48.57	−51.43
Turnout		273,170		
Republican hold		Swing		

United States House of Representatives elections in Texas, 2016: District 8
Party	Candidate	Votes	%	±%
Republican	Kevin Brady (incumbent)	236,379	100.00	+10.68
Majority		236,379	100.00	+21.36
Turnout		236,379		
Republican hold		Swing		

United States House of Representatives elections in Texas, 2014: District 8
Party	Candidate	Votes	%	±%
Republican	Kevin Brady (incumbent)	125,066	89.32	+12.03
Democratic	Ken Petty	14,947	10.68	−9.65
Majority		110,119	78.64	+21.68
Turnout		140,013		
Republican hold		Swing		

United States House of Representatives elections in Texas, 2012: District 8
Party	Candidate	Votes	%	±%
Republican	Kevin Brady (incumbent)	194,043	77.29	−2.98
Democratic	Neil Burns	51,051	20.33	+3.08
Libertarian	Roy Hall	5,958	2.37	−0.11
Majority		142,992	56.96	−6.06
Turnout		251,052		
Republican hold		Swing		

US House election, 2010: Texas District 8
Party	Candidate	Votes	%	±%
Republican	Kevin Brady (incumbent)	161,257	80.27	+7.71
Democratic	Kent Hargett	36,566	17.25	−7.53
Libertarian	Bruce West	4,988	2.48	−0.17

US House election, 2008: Texas District 8
Party	Candidate	Votes	%	±%
Republican	Kevin Brady (incumbent)	207,128	72.56	+5.3
Democratic	Kent Hargett	70,758	24.78	−7.9
Libertarian	Brian Stevens	7,565	2.65	+1.2

US House election, 2006: Texas District 8
Party	Candidate	Votes	%	±%
Republican	Kevin Brady (incumbent)	105,665	67.27	−1.63
Democratic	James "Jim" Wright	51,393	32.72	+3.02

US House election, 2004: Texas District 8
Party	Candidate	Votes	%	±%
Republican	Kevin Brady (incumbent)	179,599	68.9	−24.2
Democratic	James Wright	77,324	29.7	+29.7
Libertarian	Paul Hansen	3,705	1.4	−5.4

== Historical district boundaries ==
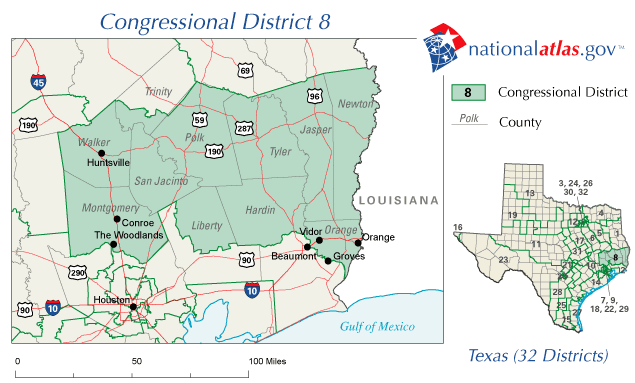
2007–2013

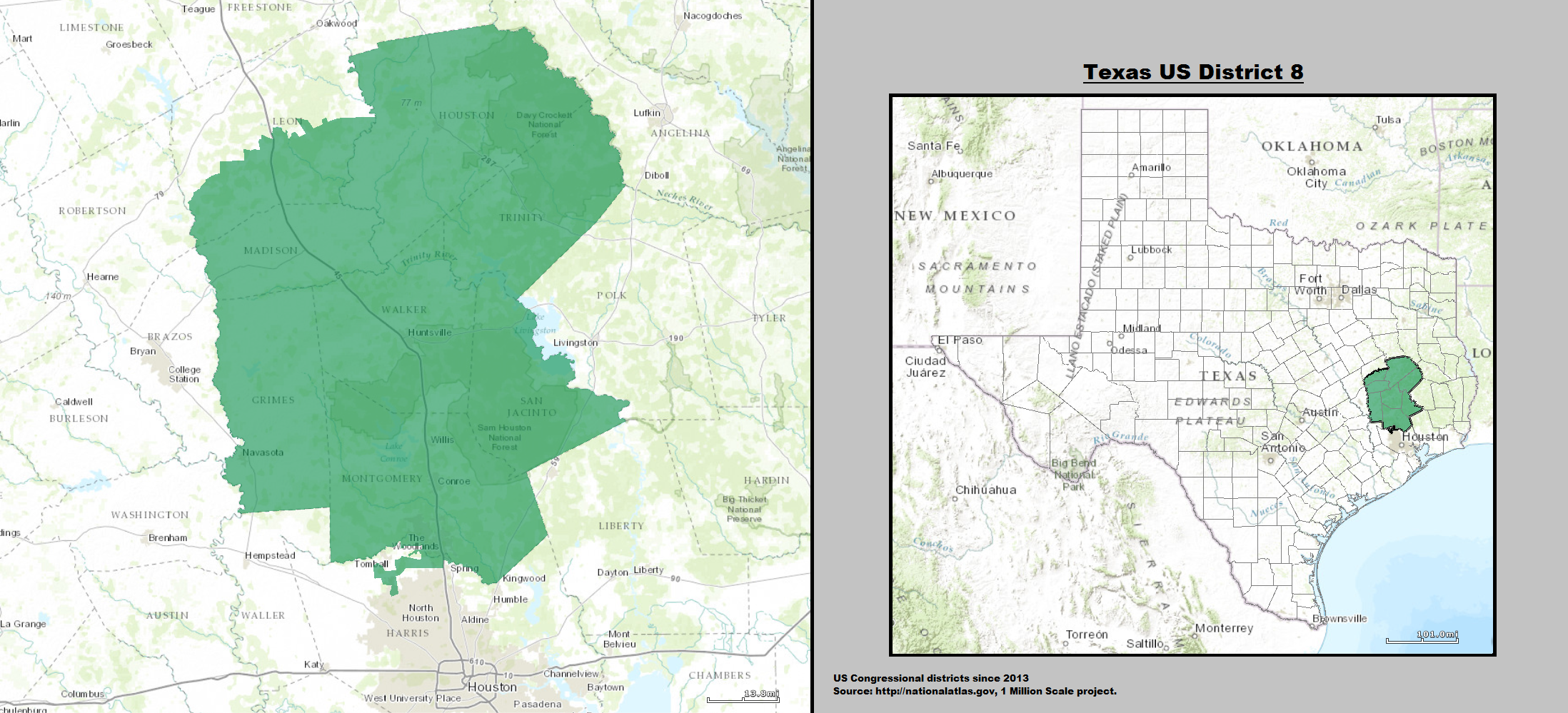
2013–2023

== See also ==
- List of United States congressional districts
