= Andrews Kurth =

Andrews Kurth Kenyon LLP
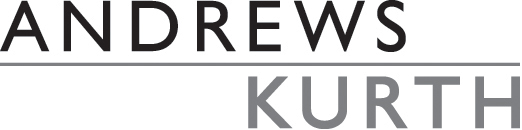
- Headquarters: JPMorgan Chase Tower; Downtown Houston, Texas
- No. of offices: 11 total, 3 international
- No. of attorneys: 400 (2016)
- Date founded: 1902
- Founders: Frank Andrews; Thomas Ball
- Company type: Limited liability partnership
- Dissolved: April 2, 2018 (merged with Hunton & Williams LLP)
- Website: www.andrewskurth.com

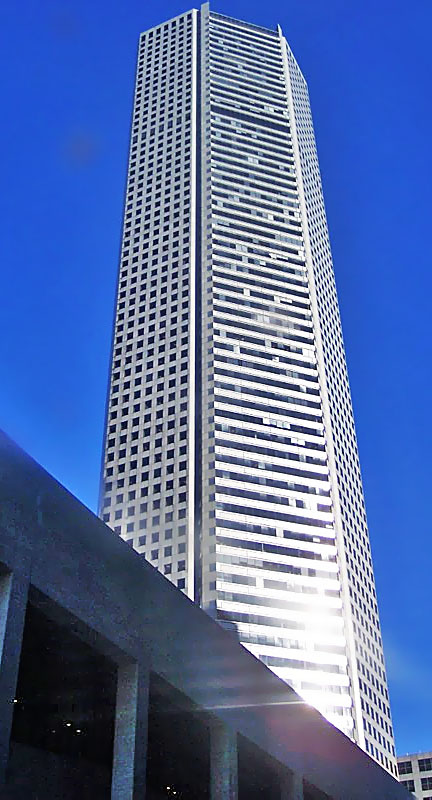
JP Morgan Chase Tower, which was the headquarters of Andrews Kurth Kenyon LLP

Andrews Kurth Kenyon LLP was a Houston, Texas based international law firm founded by Frank Andrews and U.S. Congressman Thomas Henry Ball in 1902, and later joined by Melvin Kurth in 1913. In April 2018, the firm merged with Hunton & Williams LLP to form Hunton Andrews Kurth LLP.

Prior to the merger, Andrews Kurth had over 400 attorneys in its offices in major energy, financial, and political centers worldwide, including London, Beijing, Dubai, Austin, Dallas, New York City, Research Triangle Park, NC, Silicon Valley, Washington, D.C., and Houston. At the time, the firm was led by Bob Jewell as Managing Partner and Thomas Perich as Chairman.

On February 21, 2018, it was announced that partners at Andrews Kurth Kenyon and Hunton & Williams had agreed to merge their firms and operate as Hunton Andrews Kurth, a 1,000-lawyer firm with offices in 15 US cities and another five located outside the United States.

== History ==
Andrews Kurth played a pivotal role in representing Texas railroad firms in the early 1900s, and the firm has maintained a prominent reputation in the global energy industry for over a century. They also represented both the Reconstruction Finance Corporation and Federal National Mortgage Corporation as part of FDR's New Deal. Famous clients include Howard Hughes. Andrews Kurth litigated his inheritance, IRS, and Spruce Goose cases. They also oversaw the public sale of Hughes shares in TWA.

Former U.S. Secretary of State James Baker, who worked at Andrews & Kurth after receiving his J.D. in 1957 until becoming Undersecretary of Commerce for U.S. President Gerald Ford in 1975.

In 2016, Andrews Kurth welcomed approximately 55 attorneys from New York-based Kenyon & Kenyon LLP, an intellectual property boutique that dissolved that same year. The additions boosted the firm's IP practice from approximately 35 to nearly 90 attorneys. Following the transaction, Andrews Kurth LLP legally changed its name to Andrews Kurth Kenyon LLP to reflect the firm's expanded expertise in intellectual property and technology.

Andrews Kurth Kenyon is has been recognized for its diversity and women's programs by legal publications such as The National Law Review and MultiCultural Law Magazine.

Effective April 2, 2018, Hunton & Williams LLP and Andrews Kurth Kenyon LLP combined to become Hunton Andrews Kurth LLP.
