= 2026 United States House of Representatives election ratings =

The 2026 United States House of Representatives elections were held on November 3, 2026, to elect representatives from all 435 congressional districts across each of the 50 U.S. states. Five of the six non-voting delegates from the District of Columbia and the inhabited U.S. territories were also elected (Puerto Rico's delegate, the Resident Commissioner, serves four year terms and was last elected in 2024). Numerous federal, state, and local elections, including the 2026 U.S. Senate elections, were also held on this date.

== Election ratings ==
=== Latest published ratings for competitive seats ===
Several sites and individuals publish ratings of competitive seats. The seats listed below are considered competitive (not "safe" or "solid") by at least one of the rating groups or switched parties. These ratings are based upon factors such as the strength of the incumbent (if the incumbent is running for re-election), the strength of the candidates, and the partisan history of the district (the Cook Partisan Voting Index (CPVI) is one example of this metric). Each rating describes the likelihood of a given outcome in the election.

In total, there are 435 seats in the House of Representatives. 218 are needed for a majority while 290 seats are needed for a two-thirds supermajority (if all members are sitting and voting).

Most election ratings use:

- Tossup: no advantage
- Tilt (sometimes used): very slight advantage
- Lean: significant, but not overwhelming advantage
- Likely: strong, but not certain advantage
- Safe or Solid: outcome is nearly certain

The following are the latest published ratings for competitive seats.

Constituency		Incumbent		Ratings										
District	CPVI	Incumbent	Last result	Cook Nov. 2, 2026	IE Oct. 29, 2026	Sabato Nov. 2, 2026	Econ. Nov. 2, 2026 (Note: This forecast uses the terms "Likely" and "Very Likely" the same way the other forecasts use the terms "Lean" and "Likely". To avoid confusion, and for the purposes of equivalency, the terms "Likely" and "Very Likely" will be changed to "Lean" and "Likely" for the purposes of this page. Also, "tossup" is labeled "uncertain", but for the purposes of this page, it will be labelled "tossup".)	ST Nov. 2, 2026	DDHQ Nov. 2, 2026	FPO Nov. 2, 2026	Fox Oct. 27, 2026	Silver Nov. 2, 2026	RCP Nov. 2, 2026	Result
Alabama 2	R+7	Shomari Figures	54.6% D	Lean R (flip)	Tilt R (flip)	Lean D	Likely R (flip)	Tossup	Lean R (flip)	Lean R (flip)	Likely R (flip)	Lean R (flip)	Tossup	Figures
Alaska at-large	R+6	Nick Begich III	51.3% R	Lean R	Likely R	Lean R	Likely R	Likely R	Lean R	Lean R	Likely R	Likely R	Lean R	Begich
Arizona 1	R+1	David Schweikert (retiring)	51.9% R	Lean D (flip)	Tilt D (flip)	Lean D (flip)	Likely D (flip)	Likely D (flip)	Likely D (flip)	Likely D (flip)	Lean D (flip)	Likely D (flip)	Lean D (flip)	Shah (flip)
Arizona 2	R+7	Eli Crane	54.5% R	Lean R	Lean R	Lean R	Tossup	Tossup	Lean R	Lean R	Likely R	Lean R	Tossup	Crane
Arizona 5	R+10	Andy Biggs (retiring)	60.4% R	Solid R	Solid R	Safe R	Likely R	Safe R	Likely R	Safe R	Solid R	Solid R	Solid R	Lamb
Arizona 6	EVEN	Juan Ciscomani	50.0% R	Lean D (flip)	Tilt D (flip)	Lean D (flip)	Lean D (flip)	Likely D (flip)	Likely D (flip)	Likely D (flip)	Lean D (flip)	Likely D (flip)	Lean D (flip)	Mendoza (flip)
Arizona 8	R+8	Abraham Hamadeh	56.5% R	Solid R	Solid R	Safe R	Likely R	Likely R	Likely R	Likely R	Solid R	Solid R	Solid R	Hamadeh
Arkansas 2	R+8	French Hill	58.9% R	Likely R	Likely R	Likely R	Likely R	Likely R	Likely R	Likely R	Likely R	Likely R	Lean R	Hill
California 5	R+10	Tom McClintock	61.8% R	Solid R	Solid R	Safe R	Safe R	Safe R	Likely R	Safe R	Solid R	Solid R	Solid R	McClintock
California 6	D+5	Kevin Kiley	55.5% R (Note: Kiley was elected as a Republican, and switched to being an independent in March 2026.)	Solid D (flip)	Likely D (flip)	Likely D (flip)	Safe D (flip)	Safe D (flip)	Safe D (flip)	Safe D (flip)	Solid D (flip)	Solid D (flip)	Likely D (flip)	Pan (flip)
California 13	D+2	Adam Gray	50.0% D	Likely D	Tilt D	Likely D	Safe D	Safe D	Likely D	Safe D	Likely D	Solid D	Likely D	Gray
California 21	D+5	Jim Costa	52.6% D	Solid D	Solid D	Likely D	Safe D	Safe D	Safe D	Safe D	Likely D	Solid D	Solid D	Costa
California 22	D+1	David Valadao	53.4% R	Tossup	Tossup	Lean D (flip)	Safe D (flip)	Lean D (flip)	Likely D (flip)	Likely D (flip)	Tossup	Solid D (flip)	Lean D (flip)	Villegas (flip)
California 45	D+3	Derek Tran	50.1% D	Likely D	Solid D	Likely D	Safe D	Safe D	Likely D	Safe D	Likely D	Solid D	Solid D	Tran
California 48	D+2	Darrell Issa (retiring)	59.3% R	Lean D (flip)	Tilt D (flip)	Likely D (flip)	Likely D (flip)	Likely D (flip)	Likely D (flip)	Safe D (flip)	Likely D (flip)	Solid D (flip)	Likely D (flip)	von Wilpert (flip)
Colorado 3	R+5	Jeff Hurd	50.8% R	Likely R	Likely R	Lean R	Lean R	Tossup	Tossup	Tossup	Lean R	Lean R	Tossup	Hurd
Colorado 4	R+9	Lauren Boebert	53.6% R	Lean R	Likely R	Lean R	Lean R	Lean R	Likely R	Likely R	Likely R	Likely R	Tossup	Laubacher (flip)
Colorado 5	R+5	Jeff Crank	54.7% R	Tossup	Tossup	Lean D (flip)	Lean R	Lean R	Likely R	Tossup	Lean R	Tossup	Tossup	Killin (flip)
Colorado 8	EVEN	Gabe Evans	49.0% R	Lean D (flip)	Tilt D (flip)	Lean D (flip)	Lean D (flip)	Lean D (flip)	Likely D (flip)	Likely D (flip)	Lean D (flip)	Likely D (flip)	Lean D (flip)	Rutinel (flip)
Florida 2	R+8	Neal Dunn (retiring)	61.6% R	Solid R	Solid R	Safe R	Lean R	Likely R	Likely R	Safe R	Solid R	Likely R	Solid R	Rogers
Florida 3	R+10	Kat Cammack	61.6% R	Solid R	Solid R	Safe R	Safe R	Safe R	Likely R	Safe R	Solid R	Solid R	Solid R	Cammack
Florida 4	R+5	Aaron Bean	57.3% R	Likely R	Solid R	Safe R	Likely R	Safe R	Lean R	Likely R	Solid R	Likely R	Solid R	Bean
Florida 5	R+10	John Rutherford	63.1% R	Solid R	Solid R	Safe R	Likely R	Safe R	Likely R	Safe R	Solid R	Solid R	Solid R	Rutherford
Florida 7	R+5	Cory Mills (lost renomination)	56.5% R	Lean R	Likely R	Lean R	Tossup	Tossup	Lean R	Lean R	Lean R	Lean R	Lean R	Elijah
Florida 8	R+8	Mike Haridopolos	62.2% R	Solid R	Solid R	Safe R	Likely R	Safe R	Likely R	Likely R	Solid R	Likely R	Solid R	Haridopolos
Florida 9	R+8	Darren Soto	55.1% D	Lean R (flip)	Likely R (flip)	Lean R (flip)	Tossup	Tossup	Tossup	Likely R (flip)	Lean R (flip)	Lean R (flip)	Tossup	Soto
Florida 11	R+7	Daniel Webster (retiring)	60.3% R	Solid R	Solid R	Safe R	Likely R	Likely R	Likely R	Likely R	Solid R	Likely R	Solid R	Strada
Florida 12	R+7	Gus Bilirakis	71.0% R	Solid R	Solid R	Likely R	Likely R	Safe R	Safe R	Likely R	Solid R	Likely R	Likely R	Bilirakis
Florida 13	R+6	Anna Paulina Luna	54.8% R	Lean R	Lean R	Lean R	Lean R	Tossup	Lean R	Lean R	Lean R	Lean R	Tossup	Luna
Florida 14	R+4	Kathy Castor	57.0% D	Tossup	Tilt D	Lean D	Lean D	Lean D	Lean D	Lean D	Lean D	Likely D	Tossup	Castor
Florida 15	R+9	Laurel Lee	56.2% R	Solid R	Solid R	Safe R	Safe R	Safe R	Likely R	Safe R	Solid R	Solid R	Solid R	Lee
Florida 16	R+6	Vern Buchanan (retiring)	59.5% R	Likely R	Likely R	Likely R	Lean R	Likely R	Lean R	Lean R	Likely R	Likely R	Likely R	Gruters
Florida 17	R+10	Greg Steube	63.9% R	Solid R	Solid R	Safe R	Safe R	Safe R	Likely R	Safe R	Solid R	Solid R	Solid R	Steube
Florida 18	R+8	Scott Franklin	65.3% R	Solid R	Solid R	Safe R	Safe R	Safe R	Likely R	Safe R	Solid R	Solid R	Solid R	Franklin
Florida 21	R+7	Brian Mast	61.8% R	Solid R	Solid R	Safe R	Safe R	Safe R	Likely R	Safe R	Solid R	Solid R	Solid R	Mast
Florida 22	R+4	New seat	–	Tossup	Tossup	Lean D	Tossup	Lean D	Tossup	Tossup	Tossup	Lean D	Tossup	Dandiya
Florida 25	R+3	Jared Moskowitz	52.4% D	Lean D	Tilt D	Lean D	Tossup	Lean D	Lean D	Lean D	Lean D	Likely D	Lean D	Moskowitz
Florida 26	R+7	Mario Díaz-Balart	70.9% R	Solid R	Solid R	Safe R	Safe R	Safe R	Likely R	Safe R	Solid R	Solid R	Solid R	Díaz-Balart
Florida 27	R+6	María Elvira Salazar	60.4% R	Lean R	Lean R	Lean R	Likely R	Likely R	Lean R	Likely R	Lean R	Lean R	Lean R	Salazar
Georgia 1	R+8	Buddy Carter (retiring)	62.0% R	Solid R	Solid R	Safe R	Likely R	Safe R	Likely R	Likely R	Solid R	Solid R	Solid R	Kingston
Georgia 7	R+11	Rich McCormick	64.9% R	Solid R	Solid R	Safe R	Safe R	Safe R	Likely R	Safe R	Solid R	Solid R	Solid R	McCormick
Georgia 10	R+11	Mike Collins (retiring)	63.1% R	Solid R	Solid R	Safe R	Safe R	Safe R	Likely R	Safe R	Solid R	Solid R	Solid R	Gaines
Georgia 12	R+7	Rick Allen	60.3% R	Solid R	Solid R	Safe R	Safe R	Safe R	Likely R	Likely R	Solid R	Solid R	Solid R	Allen
Indiana 1	D+1	Frank J. Mrvan	53.4% D	Likely D	Likely D	Likely D	Safe D	Safe D	Safe D	Safe D	Likely D	Solid D	Likely D	Mrvan
Indiana 5	R+8	Victoria Spartz	56.6% R	Lean R	Likely R	Likely R	Lean R	Lean R	Likely R	Likely R	Likely R	Likely R	Lean R	Ford (flip)
Iowa 1	R+4	Mariannette Miller-Meeks	50.1% R	Lean D (flip)	Tilt D (flip)	Lean D (flip)	Likely D (flip)	Lean D (flip)	Likely D (flip)	Likely D (flip)	Lean D (flip)	Likely D (flip)	Lean D (flip)	Bohannan (flip)
Iowa 2	R+4	Ashley Hinson (retiring)	57.1% R	Tossup	Tossup	Lean D (flip)	Lean D (flip)	Lean D (flip)	Tossup	Tossup	Tossup	Lean D (flip)	Tossup	James (flip)
Iowa 3	R+2	Zach Nunn	51.9% R	Lean D (flip)	Tilt D (flip)	Lean D (flip)	Likely D (flip)	Lean D (flip)	Lean D (flip)	Likely D (flip)	Lean D (flip)	Likely D (flip)	Lean D (flip)	Garriott (flip)
Kansas 2	R+10	Derek Schmidt	57.1% R	Likely R	Likely R	Likely R	Likely R	Likely R	Likely R	Safe R	Solid R	Likely R	Solid R	Schmidt
Kentucky 6	R+7	Andy Barr (retiring)	63.0% R	Tossup	Tossup	Lean R	Tossup	Lean D (flip)	Tossup	Lean R	Tossup	Tossup	Tossup	Dembo (flip)
Maine 2	R+4	Jared Golden (retiring)	50.3% D	Lean R (flip)	Lean R (flip)	Lean R (flip)	Tossup	Lean R (flip)	Tossup	Tossup	Tossup	Tossup	Tossup	LePage (flip)
Maryland 1	R+8	Andy Harris	59.4% R	Solid R	Solid R	Likely R	Safe R	Likely R	Likely R	Likely R	Solid R	Solid R	Solid R	Harris
Michigan 1	R+11	Jack Bergman	59.2% R	Solid R	Solid R	Likely R	Likely R	Safe R	Likely R	Safe R	Solid R	Solid R	Solid R	Bergman
Michigan 3	D+4	Hillary Scholten	53.7% D	Solid D	Likely D	Safe D	Safe D	Safe D	Safe D	Safe D	Solid D	Solid D	Solid D	Scholten
Michigan 4	R+3	Bill Huizenga	55.1% R	Tossup	Tossup	Lean D (flip)	Tossup	Tossup	Tossup	Lean D (flip)	Tossup	Lean D (flip)	Lean D (flip)	McCann (flip)
Michigan 7	EVEN	Tom Barrett	50.3% R	Tossup	Tossup	Lean D (flip)	Lean D (flip)	Lean D (flip)	Likely D (flip)	Likely D (flip)	Lean D (flip)	Likely D (flip)	Lean D (flip)	Lawrence (flip)
Michigan 8	R+1	Kristen McDonald Rivet	51.2% D	Likely D	Solid D	Likely D	Safe D	Safe D	Safe D	Safe D	Likely D	Solid D	Solid D	McDonald Rivet
Michigan 10	R+3	John James (retiring)	51.1% R	Tossup	Tilt R	Lean D (flip)	Tossup	Lean D (flip)	Lean D (flip)	Lean D (flip)	Tossup	Lean D (flip)	Lean D (flip)	Hines (flip)
Minnesota 1	R+6	Brad Finstad	58.6% R	Lean R	Lean R	Lean R	Lean R	Lean R	Lean R	Lean R	Lean R	Tossup	Tossup	
Minnesota 2	D+3	Angie Craig (retiring)	55.6% DFL	Likely D	Likely D	Likely D	Safe D	Safe D	Safe D	Safe D	Solid D	Solid D	Likely D	Little
Minnesota 8	R+7	Pete Stauber	58.0% R	Solid R	Solid R	Safe R	Likely R	Safe R	Likely R	Likely R	Solid R	Solid R	Likely R	Stauber
Missouri 2	R+4	Ann Wagner	54.5% R	Likely R	Solid R	Lean R	Tossup	Tossup	Lean R	Tossup	Lean R	Tossup	Tossup	Wellman (flip)
Montana 1	R+5	Ryan Zinke (retiring)	52.3% R	Tossup	Tossup	Lean D (flip)	Tossup	Lean D (flip)	Tossup	Tossup	Tossup	Lean D (flip)	Tossup	Forstag (flip)
Nebraska 1	R+6	Mike Flood	60.1% R	Likely R	Likely R	Likely R	Likely R	Lean R	Likely R	Likely R	Solid R	Likely R	Likely R	Flood
Nebraska 2	D+3	Don Bacon (retiring)	50.9% R	Likely D (flip)	Lean D (flip)	Likely D (flip)	Likely D (flip)	Safe D (flip)	Safe D (flip)	Safe D (flip)	Likely D (flip)	Solid D (flip)	Likely D (flip)	Powell (flip)
Nevada 1	D+2	Dina Titus	52.0% D	Likely D	Lean D	Likely D	Safe D	Safe D	Likely D	Safe D	Likely D	Likely D	Likely D	Titus
Nevada 2	R+7	Mark Amodei (retiring)	55.0% R	Lean R	Tilt R	Lean R	Lean R	Lean R	Lean R	Lean R	Likely R	Lean R	Tossup	Benitez-Thompson (flip)
Nevada 3	D+1	Susie Lee	51.4% D	Likely D	Lean D	Likely D	Safe D	Safe D	Likely D	Safe D	Likely D	Solid D	Likely D	Lee
Nevada 4	D+2	Steven Horsford	52.7% D	Likely D	Likely D	Likely D	Safe D	Safe D	Likely D	Safe D	Likely D	Solid D	Likely D	Horsford
New Hampshire 1	D+2	Chris Pappas (retiring)	54.0% D	Likely D	Lean D	Likely D	Likely D	Likely D	Likely D	Safe D	Likely D	Solid D	Likely D	Shaheen
New Hampshire 2	D+2	Maggie Goodlander	53.0% D	Solid D	Solid D	Likely D	Safe D	Safe D	Likely D	Safe D	Solid D	Solid D	Solid D	Goodlander
New Jersey 2	R+5	Jeff Van Drew	58.0% R	Likely R	Likely R	Lean R	Likely R	Safe R	Lean R	Likely R	Likely R	Likely R	Tossup	Mullock (flip)
New Jersey 7	EVEN	Thomas Kean Jr.	51.8% R	Lean D (flip)	Tilt D (flip)	Lean D (flip)	Likely D (flip)	Likely D (flip)	Likely D (flip)	Likely D (flip)	Lean D (flip)	Likely D (flip)	Likely D (flip)	Bennett (flip)
New Jersey 9	D+2	Nellie Pou	50.8% D	Likely D	Solid D	Likely D	Safe D	Safe D	Safe D	Safe D	Likely D	Solid D	Solid D	Pou
New Mexico 2	EVEN	Gabe Vasquez	52.1% D	Lean D	Tilt D	Lean D	Likely D	Likely D	Likely D	Likely D	Likely D	Likely D	Likely D	Vasquez
New York 1	R+4	Nick LaLota	55.2% R	Solid R	Solid R	Likely R	Lean R	Likely R	Lean R	Lean R	Likely R	Lean R	Likely R	LaLota
New York 2	R+6	Andrew Garbarino	59.8% R	Solid R	Solid R	Safe R	Likely R	Safe R	Likely R	Likely R	Solid R	Likely R	Lean R	Garbarino
New York 3	EVEN	Tom Suozzi	51.8% D	Likely D	Lean D	Lean D	Safe D	Likely D	Likely D	Safe D	Likely D	Solid D	Likely D	Suozzi
New York 4	D+2	Laura Gillen	51.1% D	Likely D	Tilt D	Likely D	Safe D	Safe D	Likely D	Safe D	Likely D	Solid D	Solid D	Gillen
New York 17	D+1	Mike Lawler	52.2% R	Tossup	Tossup	Lean R	Lean D (flip)	Lean D (flip)	Lean D (flip)	Likely D (flip)	Lean D (flip)	Likely D (flip)	Tossup	Conley (flip)
New York 19	D+1	Josh Riley	51.1% D	Likely D	Solid D	Likely D	Safe D	Safe D	Likely D	Safe D	Solid D	Solid D	Solid D	Riley
New York 21	R+10	Elise Stefanik (retiring)	62.1% R	Lean R	Lean R	Lean R	Lean R	Tossup	Likely R	Likely R	Likely R	Lean R	Lean R	Constantino
New York 23	R+10	Nick Langworthy	65.8% R	Solid R	Solid R	Safe R	Safe R	Safe R	Likely R	Safe R	Solid R	Solid R	Solid R	Langworthy
North Carolina 1	R+5	Don Davis	49.5% D	Tossup	Tilt D	Lean D	Tossup	Lean D	Lean D	Lean D	Lean D	Likely D	Lean D	Davis
North Carolina 3	R+6	Greg Murphy	77.4% R	Likely R	Likely R	Likely R	Likely R	Likely R	Lean R	Likely R	Solid R	Likely R	Tossup	Smith (flip)
North Carolina 5	R+9	Virginia Foxx	59.5% R	Likely R	Solid R	Safe R	Likely R	Safe R	Likely R	Safe R	Solid R	Likely R	Likely R	Hubbard (flip)
North Carolina 6	R+9	Addison McDowell	69.2% R	Solid R	Solid R	Safe R	Safe R	Likely R	Likely R	Safe R	Solid R	Solid R	Solid R	Jefferson (flip)
North Carolina 7	R+7	David Rouzer	58.6% R	Likely R	Solid R	Safe R	Likely R	Likely R	Likely R	Likely R	Likely R	Likely R	Likely R	Rouzer
North Carolina 8	R+10	Mark Harris	59.6% R	Solid R	Solid R	Safe R	Safe R	Safe R	Likely R	Safe R	Solid R	Solid R	Solid R	Harris
North Carolina 9	R+8	Richard Hudson	56.3% R	Likely R	Likely R	Likely R	Likely R	Likely R	Likely R	Likely R	Solid R	Likely R	Lean R	Ojeda (flip)
North Carolina 10	R+9	Pat Harrigan	57.5% R	Solid R	Solid R	Safe R	Safe R	Safe R	Likely R	Safe R	Solid R	Solid R	Solid R	Harrigan
North Carolina 11	R+5	Chuck Edwards (withdrew)	56.8% R	Lean D (flip)	Tilt D (flip)	Lean D (flip)	Likely D (flip)	Lean D (flip)	Tossup	Lean D (flip)	Lean D (flip)	Likely D (flip)	Lean D (flip)	Ager (flip)
North Carolina 13	R+8	Brad Knott	58.6% R	Likely R	Likely R	Likely R	Likely R	Likely R	Likely R	Likely R	Likely R	Likely R	Lean R	Barringer (flip)
North Carolina 14	R+8	Tim Moore	58.1% R	Likely R	Solid R	Safe R	Likely R	Likely R	Likely R	Likely R	Solid R	Solid R	Solid R	Womack (flip)
Ohio 1	R+1	Greg Landsman	54.6% D	Likely D	Lean D	Likely D	Likely D	Likely D	Likely D	Likely D	Likely D	Likely D	Likely D	Landsman
Ohio 7	R+5	Max Miller	51.1% R	Tossup	Tilt D (flip)	Lean D (flip)	Tossup	Lean D (flip)	Tossup	Tossup	Tossup	Likely D (flip)	Tossup	Poindexter (flip)
Ohio 8	R+8	Warren Davidson	62.8% R	Solid R	Solid R	Safe R	Likely R	Safe R	Likely R	Safe R	Solid R	Solid R	Solid R	Davidson
Ohio 9	R+5	Marcy Kaptur	48.3% D	Lean D	Tilt D	Lean D	Lean D	Lean D	Likely D	Lean D	Tossup	Lean D	Lean D	Kaptur
Ohio 10	R+4	Mike Turner	57.6% R	Lean R	Lean R	Lean R	Likely R	Lean R	Likely R	Tossup	Likely R	Lean R	Lean R	Knickerbocker (flip)
Ohio 13	D+2	Emilia Sykes	51.1% D	Likely D	Solid D	Likely D	Safe D	Safe D	Likely D	Safe D	Likely D	Solid D	Solid D	Sykes
Ohio 15	R+5	Mike Carey	56.5% R	Lean R	Lean R	Lean R	Likely R	Lean R	Likely R	Tossup	Lean R	Lean R	Tossup	Leonard (flip)
Oklahoma 1	R+11	Kevin Hern (retiring)	60.4% R	Solid R	Solid R	Safe R	Safe R	Safe R	Likely R	Safe R	Solid R	Solid R	Solid R	Tedford
Oklahoma 5	R+9	Stephanie Bice	60.7% R	Solid R	Likely R	Safe R	Safe R	Safe R	Likely R	Likely R	Likely R	Solid R	Solid R	Bice
Pennsylvania 1	D+1	Brian Fitzpatrick	56.4% R	Tossup	Tossup	Lean D (flip)	Lean R	Tossup	Tossup	Likely D (flip)	Tossup	Lean D (flip)	Tossup	Harvie (flip)
Pennsylvania 7	R+1	Ryan Mackenzie	50.5% R	Lean D (flip)	Tilt D (flip)	Lean D (flip)	Lean D (flip)	Likely D (flip)	Likely D (flip)	Likely D (flip)	Lean D (flip)	Likely D (flip)	Lean D (flip)	Brooks (flip)
Pennsylvania 8	R+4	Rob Bresnahan	50.8% R	Lean D (flip)	Tilt D (flip)	Lean D (flip)	Tossup	Lean D (flip)	Lean D (flip)	Lean D (flip)	Tossup	Likely D (flip)	Lean D (flip)	Cognetti (flip)
Pennsylvania 10	R+3	Scott Perry	50.6% R	Lean D (flip)	Tilt D (flip)	Lean D (flip)	Lean D (flip)	Lean D (flip)	Lean D (flip)	Lean D (flip)	Lean D (flip)	Likely D (flip)	Tossup	Stelson (flip)
Pennsylvania 11	R+11	Lloyd Smucker	62.9% R	Solid R	Solid R	Safe R	Safe R	Safe R	Likely R	Safe R	Solid R	Solid R	Solid R	Smucker
Pennsylvania 16	R+11	Mike Kelly	63.7% R	Solid R	Solid R	Safe R	Safe R	Safe R	Likely R	Safe R	Solid R	Solid R	Solid R	Kelly
South Carolina 1	R+6	Nancy Mace (retiring)	58.3% R	Tossup	Tilt R	Lean R	Lean R	Lean R	Lean R	Lean R	Lean R	Lean R	Tossup	Lacore (flip)
South Carolina 2	R+7	Joe Wilson	59.5% R	Solid R	Solid R	Safe R	Safe R	Safe R	Likely R	Likely R	Solid R	Solid R	Solid R	Wilson
South Carolina 5	R+11	Ralph Norman (retiring)	59.5% R	Solid R	Solid R	Safe R	Safe R	Safe R	Likely R	Safe R	Solid R	Solid R	Solid R	Climer
Tennessee 4	R+11	Scott DesJarlais	70.0% R	Solid R	Solid R	Safe R	Safe R	Safe R	Safe R	Safe R	Solid R	Solid R	Solid R	Broderick (flip)
Tennessee 5	R+10	Andy Ogles (lost renomination)	56.8% R	Solid R	Solid R	Likely R	Likely R	Safe R	Safe R	Safe R	Solid R	Solid R	Likely R	Hatcher
Tennessee 7	R+11	Matt Van Epps	59.5% R	Solid R	Solid R	Safe R	Safe R	Safe R	Likely R	Safe R	Solid R	Solid R	Solid R	Van Epps
Tennessee 9	R+9	Steve Cohen (retiring)	71.3% D	Likely R (flip)	Likely R (flip)	Likely R (flip)	Likely R (flip)	Likely R (flip)	Likely R (flip)	Safe R (flip)	Solid R (flip)	Solid R (flip)	Likely R (flip)	Taylor (flip)
Texas 2	R+11	Dan Crenshaw (lost renomination)	65.7% R	Solid R	Solid R	Safe R	Safe R	Likely R	Likely R	Safe R	Safe R	Solid R	Solid R	Toth
Texas 5	R+10	Lance Gooden	64.1% R	Solid R	Solid R	Safe R	Safe R	Safe R	Likely R	Safe R	Solid R	Solid R	Solid R	Gooden
Texas 9	R+9	New seat	–	Likely R (flip)	Lean R (flip)	Likely R (flip)	Likely R (flip)	Likely R (flip)	Likely R (flip)	Likely R (flip)	Likely R (flip)	Likely R (flip)	Likely R (flip)	Gutierrez
Texas 10	R+10	Michael McCaul (retiring)	63.6% R	Solid R	Solid R	Safe R	Likely R	Safe R	Likely R	Safe R	Solid R	Solid R	Solid R	Gober
Texas 15	R+7	Monica De La Cruz	57.1% R	Tossup	Tilt D (flip)	Lean D (flip)	Tossup	Lean D (flip)	Tossup	Lean R	Tossup	Lean D (flip)	Lean D (flip)	Pulido (flip)
Texas 17	R+10	Pete Sessions	66.4% R	Solid R	Solid R	Safe R	Safe R	Safe R	Likely R	Safe R	Solid R	Solid R	Solid R	Sessions
Texas 21	R+10	Chip Roy (retiring)	61.9% R	Solid R	Solid R	Safe R	Likely R	Safe R	Likely R	Safe R	Solid R	Solid R	Solid R	Teixeira
Texas 22	R+11	Troy Nehls (retiring)	62.1% R	Solid R	Solid R	Safe R	Safe R	Safe R	Likely R	Safe R	Solid R	Solid R	Solid R	Nehls
Texas 23	R+7	Vacant (Note: Tony Gonzales resigned from his seat on April 14, 2026.)	62.3% R	Lean R	Likely R	Lean R	Lean R	Tossup	Lean R	Lean R	Lean R	Tossup	Tossup	Padilla Stout (flip)
Texas 24	R+8	Beth Van Duyne	60.3% R	Solid R	Solid R	Safe R	Likely R	Safe R	Likely R	Safe R	Solid R	Likely R	Likely R	Van Duyne
Texas 27	R+10	Michael Cloud	66.0% R	Solid R	Solid R	Safe R	Safe R	Safe R	Likely R	Safe R	Solid R	Solid R	Solid R	Cloud
Texas 28	R+3	Henry Cuellar	52.8% D	Likely D	Lean D	Lean D	Likely D	Safe D	Likely D	Likely D	Lean D	Likely D	Likely D	Cuellar
Texas 31	R+11	John Carter	64.5% R	Solid R	Solid R	Safe R	Safe R	Safe R	Likely R	Safe R	Solid R	Solid R	Solid R	Carter
Texas 32	R+8	New seat	–	Solid R (flip)	Solid R (flip)	Safe R (flip)	Likely R (flip)	Safe R (flip)	Likely R (flip)	Likely R (flip)	Solid R (flip)	Solid R (flip)	Likely R (flip)	Yarbrough (flip)
Texas 34	R+3	Vicente Gonzalez	51.3% D	Lean D	Tossup	Lean D	Lean D	Likely D	Likely D	Lean D	Lean D	Likely D	Lean D	Gonzalez
Texas 35	R+4	New seat	–	Tossup	Tossup	Lean D	Lean R (flip)	Lean D	Tossup	Tossup	Tossup	Tossup	Tossup	Garcia
Texas 38	R+10	Wesley Hunt (retiring)	62.7% R	Solid R	Solid R	Safe R	Safe R	Safe R	Likely R	Safe R	Solid R	Solid R	Solid R	Bonck
Virginia 1	R+3	Rob Wittman	56.4% R	Tossup	Tilt R	Lean D (flip)	Lean R	Tossup	Lean R	Lean D (flip)	Tossup	Lean D (flip)	Tossup	Taylor (flip)
Virginia 2	EVEN	Jen Kiggans	50.8% R	Lean D (flip)	Tilt D (flip)	Lean D (flip)	Lean D (flip)	Lean D (flip)	Likely D (flip)	Likely D (flip)	Lean D (flip)	Likely D (flip)	Lean D (flip)	Luria (flip)
Virginia 5	R+6	John McGuire	57.5% R	Lean R	Lean R	Lean D (flip)	Likely R	Lean R	Lean R	Lean R	Lean R	Likely R	Lean R	McGuire
Virginia 7	D+2	Eugene Vindman	51.3% D	Likely D	Solid D	Safe D	Safe D	Safe D	Likely D	Safe D	Likely D	Solid D	Solid D	Vindman
Washington 3	R+2	Marie Gluesenkamp Perez	51.7% D	Lean D	Tossup	Lean D	Lean D	Lean D	Likely D	Likely D	Lean D	Likely D	Lean D	Gluesenkamp Perez
Washington 4	R+10	Dan Newhouse (retiring)	52.02% R	Solid R	Solid R	Safe R	Safe R	Safe R	Likely R	Safe R	Solid R	Solid R	Solid R	McKinney
Washington 5	R+5	Michael Baumgartner	60.6% R	Likely R	Likely R	Likely R	Safe R	Safe R	Likely R	Likely R	Likely R	Likely R	Lean R	Baumgartner
Wisconsin 1	R+2	Bryan Steil	54.1% R	Lean R	Lean R	Lean R	Lean R	Tossup	Lean R	Lean D (flip)	Tossup	Tossup	Tossup	Berman (flip)
Wisconsin 3	R+3	Derrick Van Orden	51.4% R	Lean D (flip)	Tilt D (flip)	Lean D (flip)	Lean D (flip)	Lean D (flip)	Likely D (flip)	Likely D (flip)	Tossup	Likely D (flip)	Lean D (flip)	Cooke (flip)
Wisconsin 6	R+8	Glenn Grothman	61.2% R	Solid R	Solid R	Safe R	Safe R	Safe R	Likely R	Safe R	Solid R	Solid R	Solid R	Grothman
Wisconsin 7	R+11	Tom Tiffany (retiring)	63.6% R	Solid R	Solid R	Safe R	Likely R	Safe R	Likely R	Safe R	Solid R	Solid R	Solid R	Alfonso
Wisconsin 8	R+8	Tony Wied	57.3% R	Solid R	Solid R	Safe R	Safe R	Safe R	Likely R	Likely R	Solid R	Solid R	Solid R	Wied
Wyoming at-large	R+23	Harriet Hageman (retiring)	70.6% R	Solid R	Likely R	Safe R	Safe R	Safe R	Safe R	Safe R	Solid R	Solid R	Solid R	Gray
Overall				D – 222; R – 195; 18 tossups	D – 224; R – 198; 13 tossups	D – 239; R – 196	D – 230; R – 190; 15 tossups	D – 225; R – 197; 13 tossups	D – 223; R – 203; 9 tossups	D – 230; R – 196; 9 tossups	D – 223; R – 195; 17 tossups	D – 230; R – 196; 9 tossups	D – 226; R – 189; 20 tossups	D – 259; R – 173; 1 undecided 2 runoffs

== Party listings ==
The two parties' campaign committees (the National Republican Congressional Committee and Democratic Congressional Campaign Committee) published their own lists of targeted seats.

=== Republican-held seats ===
On April 8, 2025, the Democratic Congressional Campaign Committee released their target seat list which included Republican-held seats and open seats. On December 10, 2025, the list was revised adding four districts (CA-48, FL-15, NC-3, and NC-11) and removing two (CA-40 and CA-41). It was revised again on February 10, 2026, where five more districts (CO-5, MN-1, MT-1, SC-1, and VA-5) were added. A subsequent revision on July 9, 2026, added one district (FL-16) and removed one district (FL-15). Another subsequent revision occurred on August 5, 2026, where eleven more districts (AR-2, CO-3, CO-4, FL-12, IN-5, NC-9, NE-1, NV-2, NY-1, NY-21, and TX-23) were added to the list. One last revision occurred on October 2, 2026, where seven more districts (KS-2, MI-1, NC-13, NJ-2, OK-5, VA-6, and WA-5) were added.

1. Alaska 1: Nick Begich III
2. Arizona 1: Open seat
3. Arizona 2: Eli Crane
4. Arizona 6: Juan Ciscomani
5. Arkansas 2: French Hill
6. California 22: David Valadao
7. California 48: Open seat
8. Colorado 3: Jeff Hurd
9. Colorado 4: Lauren Boebert
10. Colorado 5: Jeff Crank
11. Colorado 8: Gabe Evans
12. Florida 7: Open seat
13. Florida 12: Gus Bilirakis
14. Florida 13: Anna Paulina Luna
15. Florida 16: Open seat
16. Florida 27: Maria Elvira Salazar
17. Indiana 5: Victoria Spartz
18. Iowa 1: Mariannette Miller-Meeks
19. Iowa 2: Open seat
20. Iowa 3: Zach Nunn
21. Kansas 2: Derek Schmidt
22. Kentucky 6: Open seat
23. Michigan 1: Jack Bergman
24. Michigan 4: Bill Huizenga
25. Michigan 7: Tom Barrett
26. Michigan 10: Open seat
27. Minnesota 1: Brad Finstad
28. Missouri 2: Ann Wagner
29. Montana 1: Open seat
30. Nebraska 1: Mike Flood
31. Nebraska 2: Open seat
32. Nevada 2: Open seat
33. New Jersey 2: Jeff Van Drew
34. New Jersey 7: Thomas Kean Jr.
35. New York 1: Nick LaLota
36. New York 17: Mike Lawler
37. New York 21: Open seat
38. North Carolina 3: Greg Murphy
39. North Carolina 9: Richard Hudson
40. North Carolina 11: Open seat
41. North Carolina 13: Brad Knott
42. Ohio 7: Max Miller
43. Ohio 10: Mike Turner
44. Ohio 15: Mike Carey
45. Oklahoma 5: Stephanie Bice
46. Pennsylvania 1: Brian Fitzpatrick
47. Pennsylvania 7: Ryan Mackenzie
48. Pennsylvania 8: Rob Bresnahan
49. Pennsylvania 10: Scott Perry
50. South Carolina 1: Open seat
51. Tennessee 5: Open seat
52. Texas 15: Monica De La Cruz
53. Texas 23: Open seat
54. Virginia 1: Rob Wittman
55. Virginia 2: Jen Kiggans
56. Virginia 5: John McGuire
57. Virginia 6: Ben Cline
58. Washington 5: Michael Baumgartner
59. Wisconsin 1: Bryan Steil
60. Wisconsin 3: Derrick Van Orden

=== Democratic-held seats ===
On March 17, 2025, the National Republican Congressional Committee released their target seat list which included Democratic-held seats and open seats. On September 18, 2025, this list was revised adding three districts (TX-9, TX-32, and TX-35). It was revised again on July 20, 2026, where eight more districts (AL-2, FL-14, FL-22, FL-25, LA-6, MO-5, OH-1, and TN-9) were added and one district (FL-23) was removed. The Democratic Congressional Campaign Committee also released its frontline members, which are bolded below, and the ones not bolded are seats targeted by the Republican committee but not in the Democratic committee frontline program:

1. **Alabama 2: Shomari Figures**
2. California 9: Josh Harder
3. **California 13: Adam Gray**
4. California 27: George Whitesides
5. **California 45: Derek Tran**
6. California 47: Dave Min
7. **Florida 9: Darren Soto**
8. **Florida 14: Kathy Castor**
9. Florida 22: New seat
10. **Florida 25: Jared Moskowitz**
11. **Indiana 1: Frank Mrvan**
12. Louisiana 6: Open seat
13. Maine 2: Open seat
14. **Michigan 8: Kristen McDonald Rivet**
15. Missouri 5: Emanuel Cleaver
16. **North Carolina 1: Don Davis**
17. New Hampshire 1: Open seat
18. **New Jersey 9: Nellie Pou**
19. **New Mexico 2: Gabe Vasquez**
20. **Nevada 1: Dina Titus**
21. **Nevada 3: Susie Lee**
22. **Nevada 4: Steven Horsford**
23. **New York 3: Tom Suozzi**
24. **New York 4: Laura Gillen**
25. **New York 19: Josh Riley**
26. **Ohio 1: Greg Landsman**
27. **Ohio 9: Marcy Kaptur**
28. **Ohio 13: Emilia Sykes**
29. Tennessee 9: Open seat
30. Texas 9: New seat
31. **Texas 28: Henry Cuellar**
32. Texas 32: New seat
33. **Texas 34: Vicente Gonzalez**
34. Texas 35: New seat
35. **Virginia 7: Eugene Vindman**
36. **Washington 3: Marie Gluesenkamp Perez**
