= Janet Dudding =

American politician

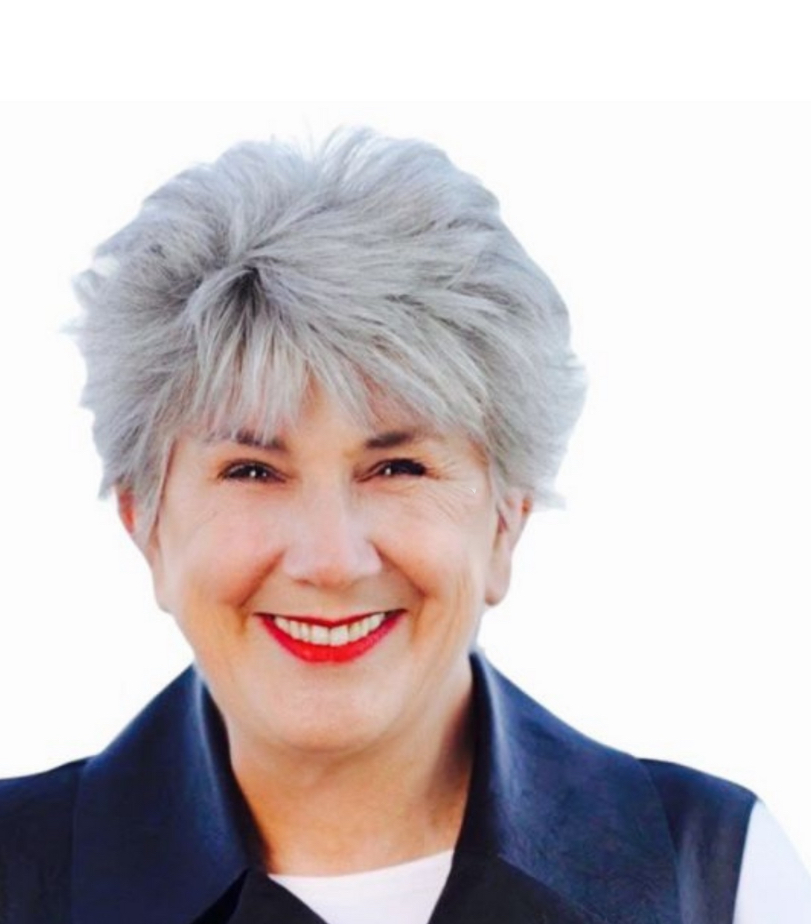

Member-elect of the Texas House of Representatives from the 14th district
- Assuming office TBD
- Succeeding: Paul Dyson

Personal details
- Born: 1958/1959 (age 67–68)
- Party: Democratic
- Spouse: James
- Education: University of Southern Mississippi (BSBA); Millsaps College (MBA)
- Occupation: Certified Public Accountant

Janet Tycelia Dudding (born 1958/1959) is an American politician and certified public accountant. She is a member-elect of the Texas House of Representatives for the 14th district, having defeated incumbent Republican Paul Dyson in 2026. A member of the Democratic Party, she was the party's nominee for the Texas Comptroller of Public Accounts in 2022 and for the 14th district of the Texas House of Representatives in 2020.

== Early life and career ==
Dudding earned a BSBA in accounting from the University of Southern Mississippi and an MBA from Millsaps College. At 22-years old, she underwent a complete hysterectomy, which she noted may have been denied under Texas' abortions laws in 2022.

Dudding began working for the Mississippi State Auditor in investigative audits in the 1980s, including working on Operation Pretense, then began working on county audits.

== Political career ==
Dudding first ran for the 14th district of the Texas House of Representatives in 2020. She was defeated by incumbent Republican John Raney.

In 2022, Dudding ran for the Texas Comptroller of Public Accounts. She lost in the general election to incumbent Republican Glenn Hegar.

Dudding ran for the 14th district of the Texas House of Representatives again in 2026. She defeated incumbent Republican Paul Dyson in the general election.

== Personal life ==
Dudding and her husband, James, moved to Bryan-College Station in 2005 after her hometown, Bay St. Louis-Waveland, Mississippi, was destroyed in Hurricane Katrina. They are members of St. Andrew’s Episcopal Church in Bryan.
