= Seniority in the United States House of Representatives =

This is a complete list of current United States representatives based on seniority. For the most part, representatives are ranked by the beginning of their terms in office. Representatives whose terms begin the same day are ranked alphabetically by last name.

== Seniority calculation ==
Seniority is calculated by:

1. Number of total terms served (subtracting one term from the number of non-consecutive terms)
2. Number of consecutive terms served
3. Alphabetically by last name

An additional clause applies for representatives that have a prior tenure of less than two terms. In this case, they will have preference over all other members who are freshmen by tenure.

An example of this ranking system is Rep. Pete Sessions, who had previously served eleven terms, from 1997 to 2019; after his defeat in the 2018 midterms, he was once again elected in 2020. Instead of holding seniority with others whose terms began January 3, 2021, he was credited with ten terms, and holds seniority above all representatives whose terms began on or after January 3, 2001.

== Benefits of seniority ==
Committee leadership in the House is often associated with seniority, especially in the Democratic Caucus. The Republican leadership, in comparison with the Democratic Party, prioritizes voting records and campaign fundraising over seniority for committee leadership. Party leadership in the House is not strictly associated with seniority.

The more senior a representative is, the more likely the representative is to receive desirable committee assignments or leadership posts. Seniority also affects access to more desirable office space in the House Office Buildings: after an office is vacated, members next in seniority can choose whether to move into it. Only after allocations for existing members are complete can incoming members be assigned offices via the congressional office lottery.

== Vacancies ==
- Texas 23: Tony Gonzales (R) resigned on April 14, 2026. The seat will remain vacant through the remainder of the congressional session as Governor Greg Abbott did not set a date for it.
- Florida 20: Sheila Cherfilus-McCormick (D) resigned on April 21, 2026. The seat will remain vacant through the remainder of the congressional session as Governor Ron DeSantis did not set a date for it.

== Current seniority list ==
Rank	Name	Party	District	Seniority date	Previous service (Note: Members elected with substantial prior service receive credit for part of that service when calculating seniority.)	Committee and leadership positions
1	Hal Rogers	R	Kentucky 5	January 3, 1981		Dean of the House
2	Chris Smith	R	New Jersey 4	January 3, 1981		
3	Steny Hoyer	D	Maryland 5	May 19, 1981		
4	Marcy Kaptur	D	Ohio 9	January 3, 1983		
5	Nancy Pelosi	D	California 11	June 2, 1987		Speaker emerita of the House
6	Frank Pallone	D	New Jersey 6	November 8, 1988		Ranking Member: Energy and Commerce
7	Richard Neal	D	Massachusetts 1	January 3, 1989		Ranking Member: Ways and Means
8	Rosa DeLauro	D	Connecticut 3	January 3, 1991		Ranking Member: Appropriations
9	Maxine Waters	D	California 43	January 3, 1991		Ranking Member: Financial Services
10	Jerry Nadler	D	New York 12	November 3, 1992		
11	Sanford Bishop	D	Georgia 2	January 3, 1993		
12	Ken Calvert	R	California 41	January 3, 1993		
13	Jim Clyburn	D	South Carolina 6	January 3, 1993		
14	Bobby Scott	D	Virginia 3	January 3, 1993		Ranking Member: Education and Workforce
15	Nydia Velázquez	D	New York 7	January 3, 1993		Ranking Member: Small Business
16	Bennie Thompson	D	Mississippi 2	April 13, 1993		Ranking Member: Homeland Security
17	Frank Lucas	R	Oklahoma 3	May 10, 1994		
18	Lloyd Doggett	D	Texas 37	January 3, 1995		
19	Zoe Lofgren	D	California 18	January 3, 1995		Ranking Member: Science, Space and Technology
20	Robert Aderholt	R	Alabama 4	January 3, 1997		
21	Danny Davis	D	Illinois 7	January 3, 1997		
22	Diana DeGette	D	Colorado 1	January 3, 1997		
23	Jim McGovern	D	Massachusetts 2	January 3, 1997		Ranking Member: Rules
24	Brad Sherman	D	California 32	January 3, 1997		
25	Adam Smith	D	Washington 9	January 3, 1997		Ranking Member: Armed Services
26	Gregory Meeks	D	New York 5	February 3, 1998		Ranking Member: Foreign Affairs
27	John B. Larson	D	Connecticut 1	January 3, 1999		
28	Jan Schakowsky	D	Illinois 9	January 3, 1999		
29	Mike Simpson	R	Idaho 2	January 3, 1999		
30	Mike Thompson	D	California 4	January 3, 1999		
31	Pete Sessions	R	Texas 17	January 3, 2021	1997–2019	
32	Sam Graves	R	Missouri 6	January 3, 2001		Chair: Transportation and Infrastructure
33	Rick Larsen	D	Washington 2	January 3, 2001		Ranking Member: Transportation and Infrastructure
34	Betty McCollum	D	Minnesota 4	January 3, 2001		
35	Stephen Lynch	D	Massachusetts 8	October 16, 2001		
36	Joe Wilson	R	South Carolina 2	December 18, 2001		
37	John Carter	R	Texas 31	January 3, 2003		
38	Tom Cole	R	Oklahoma 4	January 3, 2003		Chair: Appropriations
39	Mario Díaz-Balart	R	Florida 26	January 3, 2003		
40	Mike Rogers	R	Alabama 3	January 3, 2003		Chair: Armed Services
41	Linda Sánchez	D	California 38	January 3, 2003		
42	Mike Turner	R	Ohio 10	January 3, 2003		
43	Darrell Issa	R	California 48	January 3, 2021	2001–2019	
44	Emanuel Cleaver	D	Missouri 5	January 3, 2005		
45	Jim Costa	D	California 21	January 3, 2005		
46	Henry Cuellar	D	Texas 28	January 3, 2005		
47	Virginia Foxx	R	North Carolina 5	January 3, 2005		Chair: Rules
48	Al Green	D	Texas 9	January 3, 2005		
49	Michael McCaul	R	Texas 10	January 3, 2005		
50	Gwen Moore	D	Wisconsin 4	January 3, 2005		
51	Debbie Wasserman Schultz	D	Florida 25	January 3, 2005		
52	Doris Matsui	D	California 7	March 8, 2005		
53	Gus Bilirakis	R	Florida 12	January 3, 2007		
54	Vern Buchanan	R	Florida 16	January 3, 2007		
55	Kathy Castor	D	Florida 14	January 3, 2007		
56	Yvette Clarke	D	New York 9	January 3, 2007		
57	Steve Cohen	D	Tennessee 9	January 3, 2007		
58	Joe Courtney	D	Connecticut 2	January 3, 2007		
59	Hank Johnson	D	Georgia 4	January 3, 2007		
60	Jim Jordan	R	Ohio 4	January 3, 2007		Chair: Judiciary
61	Adrian Smith	R	Nebraska 3	January 3, 2007		
62	Bob Latta	R	Ohio 5	December 11, 2007		
63	Rob Wittman	R	Virginia 1	December 11, 2007		
64	André Carson	D	Indiana 7	March 11, 2008		
65	Steve Scalise	R	Louisiana 1	May 3, 2008		Majority Leader
66	Brett Guthrie	R	Kentucky 2	January 3, 2009		Chair: Energy and Commerce
67	Jim Himes	D	Connecticut 4	January 3, 2009		Ranking Member: Intelligence
68	Tom McClintock	R	California 5	January 3, 2009		
69	Chellie Pingree	D	Maine 1	January 3, 2009		
70	Glenn Thompson	R	Pennsylvania 15	January 3, 2009		Chair: Agriculture
71	Paul Tonko	D	New York 20	January 3, 2009		
72	Mike Quigley	D	Illinois 5	April 7, 2009		
73	Judy Chu	D	California 28	July 14, 2009		
74	John Garamendi	D	California 8	November 3, 2009		
75	Tim Walberg	R	Michigan 5	January 3, 2011	2007–2009	Chair: Education and Workforce
76	Bill Foster	D	Illinois 11	January 3, 2013	2008–2011	
77	Kweisi Mfume	D	Maryland 7	April 28, 2020	1987–1996	
78	Rick Crawford	R	Arkansas 1	January 3, 2011		Chair: Intelligence
79	Scott DesJarlais	R	Tennessee 4	January 3, 2011		
80	Chuck Fleischmann	R	Tennessee 3	January 3, 2011		
81	Paul Gosar	R	Arizona 9	January 3, 2011		
82	Morgan Griffith	R	Virginia 9	January 3, 2011		
83	Andy Harris	R	Maryland 1	January 3, 2011		
84	Bill Huizenga	R	Michigan 4	January 3, 2011		
85	Bill Keating	D	Massachusetts 9	January 3, 2011		
86	Mike Kelly	R	Pennsylvania 16	January 3, 2011		
87	David Schweikert	R	Arizona 1	January 3, 2011		
88	Austin Scott	R	Georgia 8	January 3, 2011		
89	Terri Sewell	D	Alabama 7	January 3, 2011		
90	Daniel Webster	R	Florida 11	January 3, 2011		
91	Frederica Wilson	D	Florida 24	January 3, 2011		
92	Steve Womack	R	Arkansas 3	January 3, 2011		
93	Mark Amodei	R	Nevada 2	September 13, 2011		
94	Suzanne Bonamici	D	Oregon 1	January 31, 2012		
95	Suzan DelBene	D	Washington 1	November 6, 2012		
96	Thomas Massie	R	Kentucky 4	November 6, 2012		
97	Dina Titus	D	Nevada 1	January 3, 2013	2009–2011	
98	Andy Barr	R	Kentucky 6	January 3, 2013		
99	Joyce Beatty	D	Ohio 3	January 3, 2013		
100	Ami Bera	D	California 6	January 3, 2013		
101	Julia Brownley	D	California 26	January 3, 2013		
102	Joaquin Castro	D	Texas 20	January 3, 2013		
103	Lois Frankel	D	Florida 22	January 3, 2013		
104	Richard Hudson	R	North Carolina 9	January 3, 2013		
105	Jared Huffman	D	California 2	January 3, 2013		Ranking Member: Natural Resources
106	Hakeem Jeffries	D	New York 8	January 3, 2013		Minority Leader
107	David Joyce	R	Ohio 14	January 3, 2013		
108	Grace Meng	D	New York 6	January 3, 2013		
109	Scott Perry	R	Pennsylvania 10	January 3, 2013		
110	Scott Peters	D	California 50	January 3, 2013		
111	Mark Pocan	D	Wisconsin 2	January 3, 2013		
112	Raul Ruiz	D	California 25	January 3, 2013		
113	Mark Takano	D	California 39	January 3, 2013		Ranking Member: Veterans' Affairs
114	Juan Vargas	D	California 52	January 3, 2013		
115	Marc Veasey	D	Texas 33	January 3, 2013		
116	Ann Wagner	R	Missouri 2	January 3, 2013		
117	Randy Weber	R	Texas 14	January 3, 2013		
118	Roger Williams	R	Texas 25	January 3, 2013		Chair: Small Business
119	Robin Kelly	D	Illinois 2	April 9, 2013		
120	Jason Smith	R	Missouri 8	June 4, 2013		Chair: Ways and Means
121	Katherine Clark	D	Massachusetts 5	December 10, 2013		Minority Whip
122	Alma Adams	D	North Carolina 12	November 4, 2014		
123	Donald Norcross	D	New Jersey 1	November 4, 2014		
124	Ed Case	D	Hawaii 1	January 3, 2019	2002–2007	
125	Pete Aguilar	D	California 33	January 3, 2015		Democratic Caucus Chair
126	Rick Allen	R	Georgia 12	January 3, 2015		
127	Brian Babin	R	Texas 36	January 3, 2015		Chair: Science, Space and Technology
128	Don Beyer	D	Virginia 8	January 3, 2015		
129	Mike Bost	R	Illinois 12	January 3, 2015		Chair: Veterans' Affairs
130	Brendan Boyle	D	Pennsylvania 2	January 3, 2015		Ranking Member: Budget
131	Buddy Carter	R	Georgia 1	January 3, 2015		
132	Mark DeSaulnier	D	California 10	January 3, 2015		Ranking Member: Ethics
133	Debbie Dingell	D	Michigan 6	January 3, 2015		
134	Tom Emmer	R	Minnesota 6	January 3, 2015		Majority Whip
135	Glenn Grothman	R	Wisconsin 6	January 3, 2015		
136	French Hill	R	Arkansas 2	January 3, 2015		Chair: Financial Services
137	Ted Lieu	D	California 36	January 3, 2015		
138	Barry Loudermilk	R	Georgia 11	January 3, 2015		
139	John Moolenaar	R	Michigan 2	January 3, 2015		
140	Seth Moulton	D	Massachusetts 6	January 3, 2015		
141	Dan Newhouse	R	Washington 4	January 3, 2015		
142	Gary Palmer	R	Alabama 6	January 3, 2015		
143	David Rouzer	R	North Carolina 7	January 3, 2015		
144	Elise Stefanik	R	New York 21	January 3, 2015		
145	Norma Torres	D	California 35	January 3, 2015		
146	Bonnie Watson Coleman	D	New Jersey 12	January 3, 2015		
147	Bruce Westerman	R	Arkansas 4	January 3, 2015		Chair: Natural Resources
148	Trent Kelly	R	Mississippi 1	June 2, 2015		
149	Darin LaHood	R	Illinois 16	September 10, 2015		
150	Warren Davidson	R	Ohio 8	June 7, 2016		
151	James Comer	R	Kentucky 1	November 8, 2016		Chair: Oversight and Accountability
152	Dwight Evans	D	Pennsylvania 3	November 8, 2016		
153	Brad Schneider	D	Illinois 10	January 3, 2017	2013–2015	
154	David Valadao	R	California 22	January 3, 2021	2013–2019	
155	Jodey Arrington	R	Texas 19	January 3, 2017		Chair: Budget
156	Don Bacon	R	Nebraska 2	January 3, 2017		
157	Nanette Barragán	D	California 44	January 3, 2017		
158	Jack Bergman	R	Michigan 1	January 3, 2017		
159	Andy Biggs	R	Arizona 5	January 3, 2017		
160	Salud Carbajal	D	California 24	January 3, 2017		
161	Lou Correa	D	California 46	January 3, 2017		
162	Neal Dunn	R	Florida 2	January 3, 2017		
163	Adriano Espaillat	D	New York 13	January 3, 2017		
164	Brian Fitzpatrick	R	Pennsylvania 1	January 3, 2017		
165	Vicente Gonzalez	D	Texas 34	January 3, 2017		
166	Josh Gottheimer	D	New Jersey 5	January 3, 2017		
167	Clay Higgins	R	Louisiana 3	January 3, 2017		
168	Pramila Jayapal	D	Washington 7	January 3, 2017		
169	Mike Johnson	R	Louisiana 4	January 3, 2017		Speaker of the House
170	Ro Khanna	D	California 17	January 3, 2017		
171	Raja Krishnamoorthi	D	Illinois 8	January 3, 2017		
172	David Kustoff	R	Tennessee 8	January 3, 2017		
173	Brian Mast	R	Florida 21	January 3, 2017		Chair: Foreign Affairs
174	Jimmy Panetta	D	California 19	January 3, 2017		
175	Jamie Raskin	D	Maryland 8	January 3, 2017		Ranking Member: Judiciary
176	John Rutherford	R	Florida 5	January 3, 2017		
177	Lloyd Smucker	R	Pennsylvania 11	January 3, 2017		
178	Darren Soto	D	Florida 9	January 3, 2017		
179	Ron Estes	R	Kansas 4	April 11, 2017		
180	Jimmy Gomez	D	California 34	June 6, 2017		
181	Ralph Norman	R	South Carolina 5	June 20, 2017		
182	Michael Cloud	R	Texas 27	June 30, 2018		
183	Troy Balderson	R	Ohio 12	August 7, 2018		
184	Kevin Hern	R	Oklahoma 1	November 6, 2018		
185	Joseph Morelle	D	New York 25	November 6, 2018		Ranking Member: House Administration
186	Mary Gay Scanlon	D	Pennsylvania 5	November 6, 2018		
187	Steven Horsford	D	Nevada 4	January 3, 2019	2013–2015	
188	Tom Suozzi	D	New York 3	February 13, 2024	2017–2023	
189	Jim Baird	R	Indiana 4	January 3, 2019		
190	Tim Burchett	R	Tennessee 2	January 3, 2019		
191	Sean Casten	D	Illinois 6	January 3, 2019		
192	Ben Cline	R	Virginia 6	January 3, 2019		
193	Angie Craig	D	Minnesota 2	January 3, 2019		Ranking Member: Agriculture
194	Dan Crenshaw	R	Texas 2	January 3, 2019		
195	Jason Crow	D	Colorado 6	January 3, 2019		
196	Sharice Davids	D	Kansas 3	January 3, 2019		
197	Madeleine Dean	D	Pennsylvania 4	January 3, 2019		
198	Veronica Escobar	D	Texas 16	January 3, 2019		
199	Lizzie Fletcher	D	Texas 7	January 3, 2019		
200	Russ Fulcher	R	Idaho 1	January 3, 2019		
201	Chuy García	D	Illinois 4	January 3, 2019		
202	Sylvia Garcia	D	Texas 29	January 3, 2019		
203	Jared Golden	D	Maine 2	January 3, 2019		
204	Lance Gooden	R	Texas 5	January 3, 2019		
205	Michael Guest	R	Mississippi 3	January 3, 2019		Chair: Ethics
206	Josh Harder	D	California 9	January 3, 2019		
207	Jahana Hayes	D	Connecticut 5	January 3, 2019		
208	Chrissy Houlahan	D	Pennsylvania 6	January 3, 2019		
209	Dusty Johnson	R	South Dakota at-large	January 3, 2019		
210	John Joyce	R	Pennsylvania 13	January 3, 2019		
211	Susie Lee	D	Nevada 3	January 3, 2019		
212	Mike Levin	D	California 49	January 3, 2019		
213	Lucy McBath	D	Georgia 6	January 3, 2019		
214	Dan Meuser	R	Pennsylvania 9	January 3, 2019		
215	Carol Miller	R	West Virginia 1	January 3, 2019		
216	Joe Neguse	D	Colorado 2	January 3, 2019		Assistant Democratic Leader
217	Alexandria Ocasio-Cortez	D	New York 14	January 3, 2019		
218	Ilhan Omar	D	Minnesota 5	January 3, 2019		
219	Chris Pappas	D	New Hampshire 1	January 3, 2019		
220	Ayanna Pressley	D	Massachusetts 7	January 3, 2019		
221	Guy Reschenthaler	R	Pennsylvania 14	January 3, 2019		
222	John Rose	R	Tennessee 6	January 3, 2019		
223	Chip Roy	R	Texas 21	January 3, 2019		
224	Kim Schrier	D	Washington 8	January 3, 2019		
225	Greg Stanton	D	Arizona 4	January 3, 2019		
226	Pete Stauber	R	Minnesota 8	January 3, 2019		
227	Bryan Steil	R	Wisconsin 1	January 3, 2019		Chair: House Administration
228	Greg Steube	R	Florida 17	January 3, 2019		
229	Haley Stevens	D	Michigan 11	January 3, 2019		
230	William Timmons	R	South Carolina 4	January 3, 2019		
231	Rashida Tlaib	D	Michigan 12	January 3, 2019		
232	Lori Trahan	D	Massachusetts 3	January 3, 2019		
233	Lauren Underwood	D	Illinois 14	January 3, 2019		
234	Jeff Van Drew	R (Note: A party change does not affect seniority.)	New Jersey 2	January 3, 2019		
235	Greg Murphy	R	North Carolina 3	September 10, 2019		
236	Tom Tiffany	R	Wisconsin 7	May 12, 2020		
237	Claudia Tenney	R	New York 24	February 11, 2021	2017–2019	
238	Ryan Zinke	R	Montana 1	January 3, 2023	2015–2017	
239	Marlin Stutzman	R	Indiana 3	January 3, 2025	2010–2017	
240	Jake Auchincloss	D	Massachusetts 4	January 3, 2021		
241	Cliff Bentz	R	Oregon 2	January 3, 2021		
242	Stephanie Bice	R	Oklahoma 5	January 3, 2021		
243	Lauren Boebert	R	Colorado 4	January 3, 2021		
244	Kat Cammack	R	Florida 3	January 3, 2021		
245	Andrew Clyde	R	Georgia 9	January 3, 2021		
246	Byron Donalds	R	Florida 19	January 3, 2021		
247	Pat Fallon	R	Texas 4	January 3, 2021		
248	Randy Feenstra	R	Iowa 4	January 3, 2021		
249	Michelle Fischbach	R	Minnesota 7	January 3, 2021		
250	Scott Fitzgerald	R	Wisconsin 5	January 3, 2021		
251	Scott Franklin	R	Florida 18	January 3, 2021		
252	Andrew Garbarino	R	New York 2	January 3, 2021		Chair: Homeland Security
253	Carlos A. Giménez	R	Florida 28	January 3, 2021		
254	Diana Harshbarger	R	Tennessee 1	January 3, 2021		
255	Ashley Hinson	R	Iowa 2	January 3, 2021		
256	Ronny Jackson	R	Texas 13	January 3, 2021		
257	Sara Jacobs	D	California 51	January 3, 2021		
258	Young Kim	R	California 40	January 3, 2021		
259	Teresa Leger Fernandez	D	New Mexico 3	January 3, 2021		
260	Nancy Mace	R	South Carolina 1	January 3, 2021		
261	Nicole Malliotakis	R	New York 11	January 3, 2021		
262	Tracey Mann	R	Kansas 1	January 3, 2021		
263	Lisa McClain	R	Michigan 9	January 3, 2021		Republican Conference Chair
264	Mary Miller	R	Illinois 15	January 3, 2021		
265	Mariannette Miller-Meeks	R	Iowa 1	January 3, 2021		
266	Barry Moore	R	Alabama 1	January 3, 2021		
267	Blake Moore	R	Utah 1	January 3, 2021		
268	Frank J. Mrvan	D	Indiana 1	January 3, 2021		
269	Troy Nehls	R	Texas 22	January 3, 2021		
270	Jay Obernolte	R	California 23	January 3, 2021		
271	Burgess Owens	R	Utah 4	January 3, 2021		
272	August Pfluger	R	Texas 11	January 3, 2021		
273	Deborah Ross	D	North Carolina 2	January 3, 2021		
274	María Elvira Salazar	R	Florida 27	January 3, 2021		
275	Victoria Spartz	R	Indiana 5	January 3, 2021		
276	Marilyn Strickland	D	Washington 10	January 3, 2021		
277	Ritchie Torres	D	New York 15	January 3, 2021		
278	Beth Van Duyne	R	Texas 24	January 3, 2021		
279	Nikema Williams	D	Georgia 5	January 3, 2021		
280	Julia Letlow	R	Louisiana 5	March 20, 2021		
281	Troy Carter	D	Louisiana 2	April 24, 2021		
282	Melanie Stansbury	D	New Mexico 1	June 1, 2021		
283	Jake Ellzey	R	Texas 6	July 27, 2021		
284	Shontel Brown	D	Ohio 11	November 2, 2021		
285	Mike Carey	R	Ohio 15	November 2, 2021		
286	Mike Flood	R	Nebraska 1	June 28, 2022		
287	Brad Finstad	R	Minnesota 1	August 9, 2022		
288	Pat Ryan	D	New York 18	August 23, 2022		
289	Rudy Yakym	R	Indiana 2	November 8, 2022		
290	Cleo Fields	D	Louisiana 6	January 3, 2025	1993–1997	
291	Mark Alford	R	Missouri 4	January 3, 2023		
292	Becca Balint	D	Vermont at-large	January 3, 2023		
293	Aaron Bean	R	Florida 4	January 3, 2023		
294	Josh Brecheen	R	Oklahoma 2	January 3, 2023		
295	Nikki Budzinski	D	Illinois 13	January 3, 2023		
296	Eric Burlison	R	Missouri 7	January 3, 2023		
297	Greg Casar	D	Texas 35	January 3, 2023		
298	Juan Ciscomani	R	Arizona 6	January 3, 2023		
299	Mike Collins	R	Georgia 10	January 3, 2023		
300	Eli Crane	R	Arizona 2	January 3, 2023		
301	Jasmine Crockett	D	Texas 30	January 3, 2023		
302	Don Davis	D	North Carolina 1	January 3, 2023		
303	Monica De La Cruz	R	Texas 15	January 3, 2023		
304	Chris Deluzio	D	Pennsylvania 17	January 3, 2023		
305	Chuck Edwards	R	North Carolina 11	January 3, 2023		
306	Mike Ezell	R	Mississippi 4	January 3, 2023		
307	Valerie Foushee	D	North Carolina 4	January 3, 2023		
308	Maxwell Frost	D	Florida 10	January 3, 2023		
309	Russell Fry	R	South Carolina 7	January 3, 2023		
310	Robert Garcia	D	California 42	January 3, 2023		Ranking Member: Oversight and Accountability
311	Marie Gluesenkamp Perez	D	Washington 3	January 3, 2023		
312	Dan Goldman	D	New York 10	January 3, 2023		
313	Harriet Hageman	R	Wyoming at-large	January 3, 2023		
314	Erin Houchin	R	Indiana 9	January 3, 2023		
315	Val Hoyle	D	Oregon 4	January 3, 2023		
316	Wesley Hunt	R	Texas 38	January 3, 2023		
317	Glenn Ivey	D	Maryland 4	January 3, 2023		
318	Jonathan Jackson	D	Illinois 1	January 3, 2023		
319	John James	R	Michigan 10	January 3, 2023		
320	Sydney Kamlager-Dove	D	California 37	January 3, 2023		
321	Thomas Kean Jr.	R	New Jersey 7	January 3, 2023		
322	Jen Kiggans	R	Virginia 2	January 3, 2023		
323	Kevin Kiley	I	California 3	January 3, 2023		
324	Nick LaLota	R	New York 1	January 3, 2023		
325	Greg Landsman	D	Ohio 1	January 3, 2023		
326	Nick Langworthy	R	New York 23	January 3, 2023		
327	Mike Lawler	R	New York 17	January 3, 2023		
328	Laurel Lee	R	Florida 15	January 3, 2023		
329	Summer Lee	D	Pennsylvania 12	January 3, 2023		
330	Anna Paulina Luna	R	Florida 13	January 3, 2023		
331	Morgan Luttrell	R	Texas 8	January 3, 2023		
332	Seth Magaziner	D	Rhode Island 2	January 3, 2023		
333	Rich McCormick	R	Georgia 7	January 3, 2023		
334	Morgan McGarvey	D	Kentucky 3	January 3, 2023		
335	Rob Menendez	D	New Jersey 8	January 3, 2023		
336	Max Miller	R	Ohio 7	January 3, 2023		
337	Cory Mills	R	Florida 7	January 3, 2023		
338	Nathaniel Moran	R	Texas 1	January 3, 2023		
339	Jared Moskowitz	D	Florida 23	January 3, 2023		
340	Kevin Mullin	D	California 15	January 3, 2023		
341	Zach Nunn	R	Iowa 3	January 3, 2023		
342	Andy Ogles	R	Tennessee 5	January 3, 2023		
343	Brittany Pettersen	D	Colorado 7	January 3, 2023		
344	Delia Ramirez	D	Illinois 3	January 3, 2023		
345	Andrea Salinas	D	Oregon 6	January 3, 2023		
346	Hillary Scholten	D	Michigan 3	January 3, 2023		
347	Keith Self	R	Texas 3	January 3, 2023		
348	Eric Sorensen	D	Illinois 17	January 3, 2023		
349	Dale Strong	R	Alabama 5	January 3, 2023		
350	Emilia Sykes	D	Ohio 13	January 3, 2023		
351	Shri Thanedar	D	Michigan 13	January 3, 2023		
352	Jill Tokuda	D	Hawaii 2	January 3, 2023		
353	Derrick Van Orden	R	Wisconsin 3	January 3, 2023		
354	Gabe Vasquez	D	New Mexico 2	January 3, 2023		
355	Jennifer McClellan	D	Virginia 4	February 21, 2023		
356	Gabe Amo	D	Rhode Island 1	November 7, 2023		
357	Celeste Maloy	R	Utah 2	November 21, 2023		
358	Tim Kennedy	D	New York 26	April 30, 2024		
359	Vince Fong	R	California 20	May 21, 2024		
360	Michael Rulli	R	Ohio 6	June 11, 2024		
361	LaMonica McIver	D	New Jersey 10	September 18, 2024		
362	Tony Wied	R	Wisconsin 8	November 5, 2024		
363	Gil Cisneros	D	California 31	January 3, 2025	2019–2021	
364	Yassamin Ansari	D	Arizona 3	January 3, 2025		
365	Tom Barrett	R	Michigan 7	January 3, 2025		
366	Michael Baumgartner	R	Washington 5	January 3, 2025		
367	Nick Begich III	R	Alaska at-large	January 3, 2025		
368	Wesley Bell	D	Missouri 1	January 3, 2025		
369	Sheri Biggs	R	South Carolina 3	January 3, 2025		
370	Rob Bresnahan	R	Pennsylvania 8	January 3, 2025		
371	Janelle Bynum	D	Oregon 5	January 3, 2025		
372	Herb Conaway	D	New Jersey 3	January 3, 2025		
373	Jeff Crank	R	Colorado 5	January 3, 2025		
374	Maxine Dexter	D	Oregon 3	January 3, 2025		
375	Troy Downing	R	Montana 2	January 3, 2025		
376	Sarah Elfreth	D	Maryland 3	January 3, 2025		
377	Gabe Evans	R	Colorado 8	January 3, 2025		
378	Julie Fedorchak	R	North Dakota at-large	January 3, 2025		
379	Shomari Figures	D	Alabama 2	January 3, 2025		
380	Laura Friedman	D	California 30	January 3, 2025		
381	Brandon Gill	R	Texas 26	January 3, 2025		
382	Laura Gillen	D	New York 4	January 3, 2025		
383	Craig Goldman	R	Texas 12	January 3, 2025		
384	Maggie Goodlander	D	New Hampshire 2	January 3, 2025		
385	Adam Gray	D	California 13	January 3, 2025		
386	Abraham Hamadeh	R	Arizona 8	January 3, 2025		
387	Mike Haridopolos	R	Florida 8	January 3, 2025		
388	Pat Harrigan	R	North Carolina 10	January 3, 2025		
389	Mark Harris	R	North Carolina 8	January 3, 2025		
390	Jeff Hurd	R	Colorado 3	January 3, 2025		
391	Brian Jack	R	Georgia 3	January 3, 2025		
392	Julie Johnson	D	Texas 32	January 3, 2025		
393	Mike Kennedy	R	Utah 3	January 3, 2025		
394	Brad Knott	R	North Carolina 13	January 3, 2025		
395	George Latimer	D	New York 16	January 3, 2025		
396	Sam Liccardo	D	California 16	January 3, 2025		
397	Ryan Mackenzie	R	Pennsylvania 7	January 3, 2025		
398	John Mannion	D	New York 22	January 3, 2025		
399	Sarah McBride	D	Delaware at-large	January 3, 2025		
400	April McClain Delaney	D	Maryland 6	January 3, 2025		
401	Kristen McDonald Rivet	D	Michigan 8	January 3, 2025		
402	Addison McDowell	R	North Carolina 6	January 3, 2025		
403	John McGuire	R	Virginia 5	January 3, 2025		
404	Mark Messmer	R	Indiana 8	January 3, 2025		
405	Dave Min	D	California 47	January 3, 2025		
406	Riley Moore	R	West Virginia 2	January 3, 2025		
407	Tim Moore	R	North Carolina 14	January 3, 2025		
408	Kelly Morrison	D	Minnesota 3	January 3, 2025		
409	Johnny Olszewski	D	Maryland 2	January 3, 2025		
410	Bob Onder	R	Missouri 3	January 3, 2025		
411	Nellie Pou	D	New Jersey 9	January 3, 2025		
412	Emily Randall	D	Washington 6	January 3, 2025		
413	Josh Riley	D	New York 19	January 3, 2025		
414	Luz Rivas	D	California 29	January 3, 2025		
415	Derek Schmidt	R	Kansas 2	January 3, 2025		
416	Jefferson Shreve	R	Indiana 6	January 3, 2025		
417	Lateefah Simon	D	California 12	January 3, 2025		
418	Suhas Subramanyam	D	Virginia 10	January 3, 2025		
419	David Taylor	R	Ohio 2	January 3, 2025		
420	Derek Tran	D	California 45	January 3, 2025		
421	Eugene Vindman	D	Virginia 7	January 3, 2025		
422	George T. Whitesides	D	California 27	January 3, 2025		
423	Randy Fine	R	Florida 6	April 1, 2025		
424	Jimmy Patronis	R	Florida 1	April 1, 2025		
425	James Walkinshaw	D	Virginia 11	September 9, 2025		
426	Adelita Grijalva	D	Arizona 7	September 23, 2025		
427	Matt Van Epps	R	Tennessee 7	December 2, 2025		
428	Christian Menefee	D	Texas 18	January 31, 2026		
429	Clay Fuller	R	Georgia 14	April 7, 2026		
430	Analilia Mejia	D	New Jersey 11	April 16, 2026		
431	James Gallagher	R	California 1	June 2, 2026		
432	Aisha Wahab	D	California 14	August 18, 2026		
433	Everton Blair	D	Georgia 13	August 25, 2026		

== Delegates ==
Delegates are non-voting members of the United States House of Representatives.

Rank	Name	Party	District	Seniority date
1	Eleanor Holmes Norton	D	District of Columbia at-large	January 3, 1991
2	Stacey Plaskett	D	U.S. Virgin Islands at-large	January 3, 2015
3	Amata Coleman Radewagen	R	American Samoa at-large	January 3, 2015
4	James Moylan	R	Guam at-large	January 3, 2023
5	Pablo Hernández Rivera	PPD/D	Puerto Rico at-large	January 3, 2025
6	Kimberlyn King-Hinds	R	Northern Mariana Islands at-large	January 3, 2025

== See also ==
- List of current United States representatives
- List of United States congressional districts
- List of members of the United States Congress by longevity of service
- Seniority in the United States Senate
