= 2022 Texas Comptroller of Public Accounts election =

- November 8, 2022
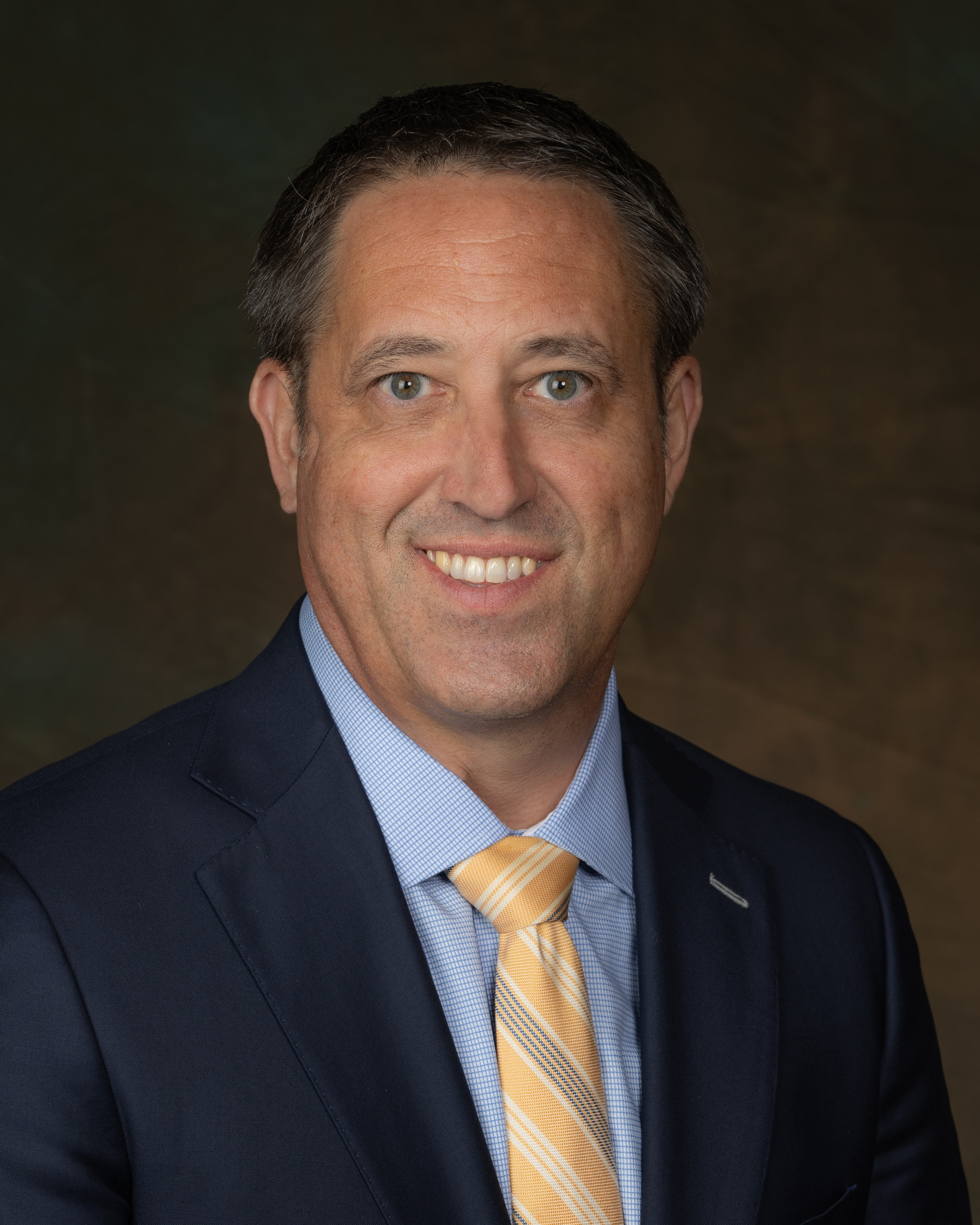

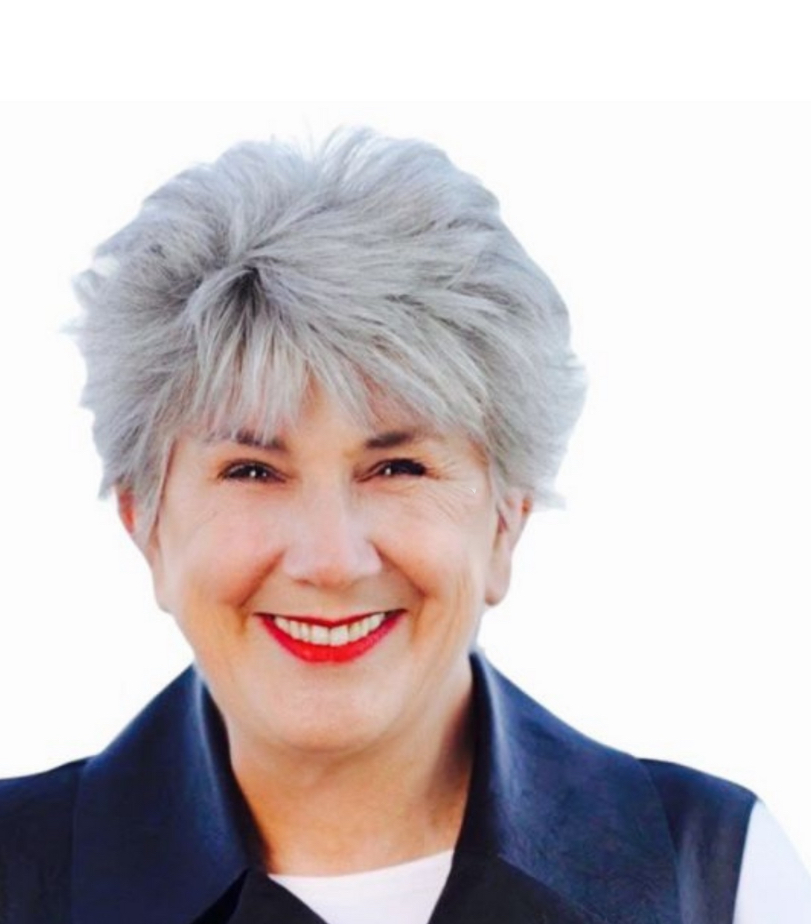
Nominee	Glenn Hegar	Janet Dudding
Party	Republican	Democratic
Popular vote	4,496,319	3,265,069
Percentage	56.39%	40.95%
- Hegar: 40–50% 50–60% 60–70% 70–80% 80–90% >90% Dudding: 40–50% 50–60% 60–70% 70–80% 80–90% >90% Tie: 40–50% 50% No data
Comptroller before election
Glenn Hegar
Republican
Elected Comptroller
Glenn Hegar
Republican

Elections took place on November 8, 2022, to select the next Texas Comptroller of Public Accounts. Incumbent Republican Party Comptroller Glenn Hegar was elected to a third term over Democratic opponent Janet Dudding, with 56.4% of the vote.

== Republican primary ==
=== Candidates ===
==== Nominee ====
- Glenn Hegar, incumbent comptroller

==== Eliminated in primary ====
- Mark V. Goloby, business owner

==== Endorsements ====
Glenn Hegar

Statewide officials

- Greg Abbott, Governor of Texas

Organizations

- Texas Alliance for Life (primary endorsement)

Newspapers

- Austin American-Statesman (primary endorsement)
- Houston Chronicle (primary endorsement)

==== Polling ====
Poll source	Date(s) administered	Sample size (Note: Key: A – all adults RV – registered voters LV – likely voters V – unclear)	Margin of error	Mark V. Goloby	Glenn Hegar	Undecided
YouGov/UH	January 14–24, 2022	490 (LV)	± 3.7%	8%	28%	64%

=== Primary results ===
Republican primary results
Party	Candidate	Votes	%
Republican	Glenn Hegar (incumbent)	1,386,782	81.69%
Republican	Mark Goloby	310,829	18.31%
Total votes		1,697,611	100.0%

== Democratic primary ==
=== Candidates ===
==== Nominee ====
- Janet Dudding, certified public accountant

==== Eliminated in runoff ====
- Angel Luis Vega, strategist and author

==== Eliminated in primary ====
- Tim Mahoney, attorney and planner

==== Endorsements ====
Janet T. Dudding

Newspapers

- Austin American-Statesman (primary endorsement)
- The Austin Chronicle (runoff endorsement)
- Houston Chronicle (primary endorsement)
- San Antonio Express-News

Labor unions

- Texas Federation of Teachers
- Texas AFL–CIO
- United Auto Workers

Organizations

- Annie's List
- Planned Parenthood Texas Votes
- Stonewall Democrats of Dallas

==== Polling ====
Poll source	Date(s) administered	Sample size	Margin of error	Janet T. Dudding	Tim Mahoney	Angel Luis Vega	Undecided
YouGov/UH	January 14–24, 2022	616 (LV)	± 3.3%	11%	10%	18%	61%

=== Primary results ===
Democratic primary results
Party	Candidate	Votes	%
Democratic	Janet Dudding	454,338	46.29%
Democratic	Angel Vega	338,877	34.53%
Democratic	Tim Mahoney	188,250	19.18%
Total votes		981,465	100.0%

=== Runoff results ===
Runoff results
Party	Candidate	Votes	%
Democratic	Janet Dudding	292,069	61.41%
Democratic	Angel Vega	183,533	38.59%
Total votes		475,602	100.0%

== Libertarian primary ==
=== Nominee ===
- Alonzo Echavarria-Garza, Hearne city manager

== General election ==
=== Endorsements ===
Janet Dudding

Newspapers

- Houston Chronicle
Glenn Hegar

Statewide officials

- Greg Abbott, Governor of Texas

Newspapers

- The Dallas Morning News

=== Polling ===
Poll source	Date(s) administered	Sample size	Margin of error	Glenn Hegar (R)	Janet Dudding (D)	Other	Undecided
Texas Hispanic Policy Foundation	September 6–15, 2022	1,172 (LV)	± 2.9%	46%	38%	3% (Note: Echavarria-Garza with 3%)	13%

=== Results ===
State Senate district results

2022 Texas Comptroller of Public Accounts election
Party	Candidate	Votes	%	±%
Republican	Glenn Hegar (incumbent)	4,496,319	56.39	▲3.20
Democratic	Janet Dudding	3,265,069	40.95	▼2.44
Libertarian	Alonzo Echavarria-Garza	212,205	2.66	▼0.76
Total votes		7,973,593	100.00	
Republican hold				

==== By congressional district ====
Hegar won 25 of 38 congressional districts.

District	Hegar	Dudding	Representative
1st	77%	21%	Louie Gohmert (117th Congress)
1st	77%	21%	Nathaniel Moran (118th Congress)
2nd	64%	34%	Dan Crenshaw
3rd	62%	36%	Van Taylor (117th Congress)
3rd	62%	36%	Keith Self (118th Congress)
4th	68%	31%	Pat Fallon
5th	64%	33%	Lance Gooden
6th	66%	32%	Jake Ellzey
7th	38%	60%	Lizzie Fletcher
8th	68%	30%	Kevin Brady (117th Congress)
8th	68%	30%	Morgan Luttrell (118th Congress)
9th	24%	73%	Al Green
10th	64%	34%	Michael McCaul
11th	74%	24%	August Pfluger
12th	62%	36%	Kay Granger
13th	75%	23%	Ronny Jackson
14th	67%	31%	Randy Weber
15th	52%	44%	Vicente Gonzalez (117th Congress)
15th	52%	44%	Monica De La Cruz (118th Congress)
16th	35%	60%	Veronica Escobar
17th	66%	32%	Pete Sessions
18th	27%	70%	Sheila Jackson Lee
19th	77%	21%	Jodey Arrington
20th	33%	62%	Joaquín Castro
21st	63%	34%	Chip Roy
22nd	62%	36%	Troy Nehls
23rd	56%	41%	Tony Gonzales
24th	61%	37%	Beth Van Duyne
25th	69%	29%	Roger Williams
26th	63%	34%	Michael Burgess
27th	64%	33%	Michael Cloud
28th	46%	49%	Henry Cuellar
29th	31%	64%	Sylvia Garcia
30th	23%	74%	Eddie Bernice Johnson (117th Congress)
30th	23%	74%	Jasmine Crockett (118th Congress)
31st	63%	35%	John Carter
32nd	37%	59%	Colin Allred
33rd	27%	69%	Marc Veasey
34th	41%	53%	Mayra Flores (117th Congress)
34th	41%	53%	Vicente Gonzalez (118th Congress)
35th	27%	68%	Lloyd Doggett (117th Congress)
35th	27%	68%	Greg Casar (118th Congress)
36th	69%	29%	Brian Babin
37th	25%	72%	Lloyd Doggett
38th	64%	34%	Wesley Hunt
