= Paul Dyson =

Paul Dyson may refer to:

- Paul Dyson (footballer), English footballer
- Paul Dyson (politician), American politician
