= Jon Bonck =

American politician (born 1987)

Member-elect of the U.S. House of Representatives from Texas's 38th district
- Assuming office January 3, 2027
- Succeeding: Wesley Hunt

Personal details
- Born: Jonathan Carl Bonck; April 28, 1987 (age 39) Louisiana, U.S.
- Party: Republican
- Spouse: Laura
- Children: 2
- Education: Louisiana State University (BS)
- Website: Campaign website

Jonathan Carl Bonck (born April 28, 1987) is an American politician and mortgage broker who is a member-elect of the United States House of Representatives for Texas's 38th congressional district. He is a member of the Republican Party.

== Personal life ==
Bonck was born on April 28, 1987, in Louisiana, and lived with his grandparents on a farm in Eunice growing up. He attended Louisiana State University, where he earned a bachelor's degree in biochemistry, and then was employed in the biochemical and petroleum industries. In 2015, Bonck began working with specialty chemical company Nalco Champion in marketing. Four years later, he entered the mortgage industry, becoming a sales manager at Bonck and Baker Mortgage Group, a division of Network Funding. He still worked as a mortgage broker for this group by 2026. Bonck also runs a realty business with his wife.

Bonck is a deacon at Second Baptist Church. He and his wife, Laura, have two children. His wife is a real estate agent. Bonck lives in Houston.

== U.S. House of Representatives ==
=== Elections ===
==== 2026 ====
Bonck launched a campaign as a Republican for Texas's 38th congressional district as part of the 2026 United States House of Representatives elections in Texas, seeking to succeed Wesley Hunt (who ran for Senate), after initially running for the 2nd congressional district. He was endorsed by President Donald Trump and Senator Ted Cruz. In the primary, he received 47% of the vote, ahead of West Houston Airport president Shelly deZevallos, who received 19%. Bonck and deZevallos advanced to the runoff, where Bonck won with 64.8% of the vote. In the general election, he ran against and defeated Democratic Party candidate Melissa McDonough.

U.S. House of Representatives
| Preceded by Wesley Hunt | Member of the U.S. House of Representatives from Texas's 38th congressional district Taking office 2027 | Elect |
