= Texas's 14th House of Representatives district =

Texas's 14th State House of Representatives district
Representative
Paul Dyson; R–Bryan
- Demographics: 52.5% White; 11.5% Black; 26.8% Hispanic; 8.0% Asian; 1.2% Other
- Population (2020) • Voting age: 203,047; 163,186

District 14 is a district in the Texas House of Representatives. It was created in the 3rd legislature (1849–1851).

The district has been represented by Republican Paul Dyson since January 14, 2025, upon his initial election to the Texas House.

As a result of redistricting after the 2020 Federal census, from the 2022 elections the district encompasses all but the eastern portion of Brazos County. Major cities in the district include the majority of Bryan and College Station. Texas A&M University is in the district.

== Members ==
- Fred Brown
- John N. Raney
- Paul Dyson
