= Congressional office lottery =

U.S. House of Representatives custom

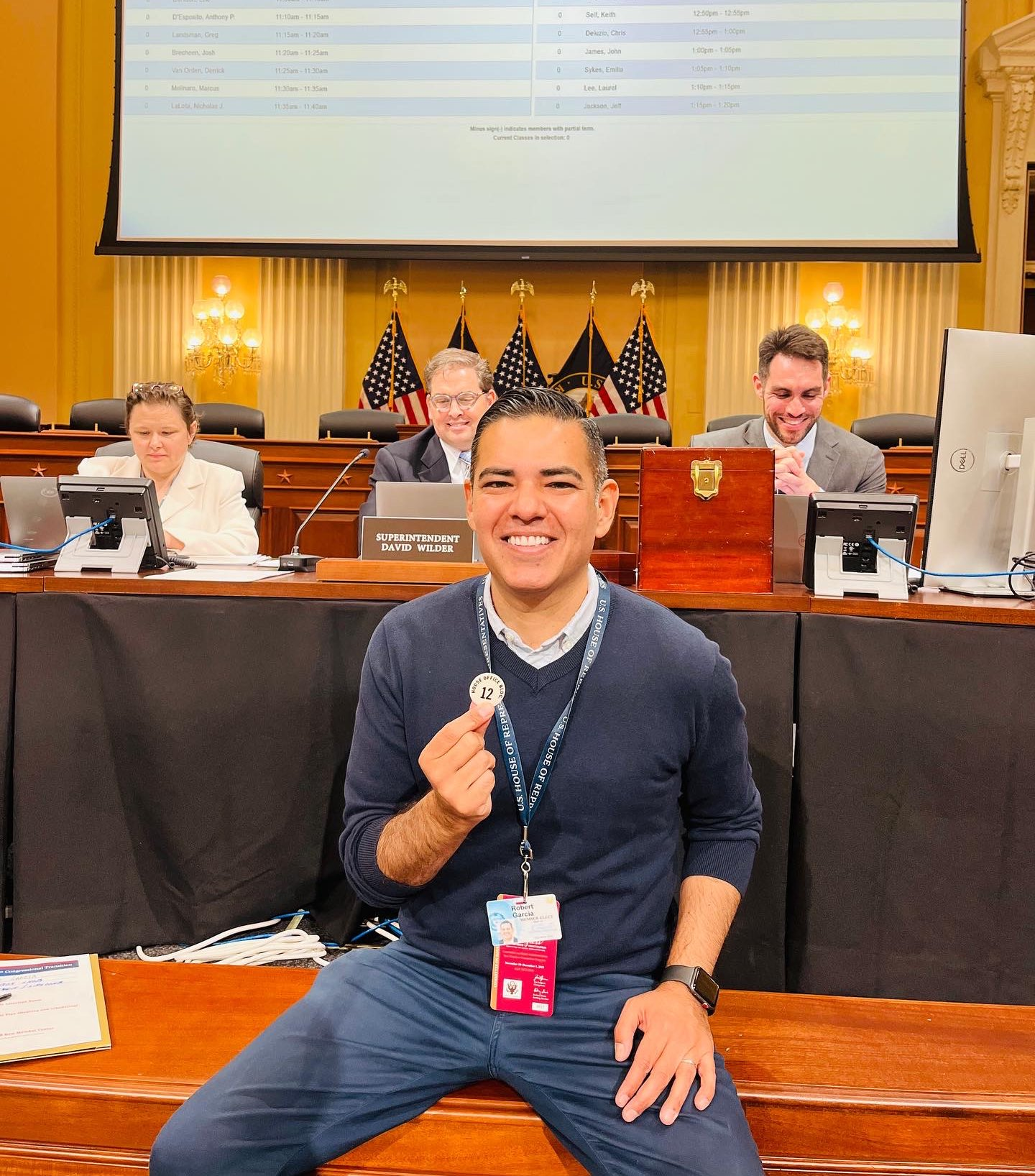
Robert Garcia after the lottery, holding the number that he drew

The office lottery for the United States House of Representatives determines the order in which incoming representatives can choose rooms in the congressional office buildings. The lottery takes place every two years following elections to that chamber and does not take place for the United States Senate.

== History ==
The office lottery began in January 1908, when a House page picked numbered marbles to assign rooms in the newly-constructed Cannon House Office Building. Before the Cannon Building was built, members had to rent their own offices in the District of Columbia.

In 2020, due to the COVID-19 pandemic, the lottery took place with allocations by algorithm and members watching on Microsoft Teams. In 2022, the draw returned to its face-to-face format.

== Process ==
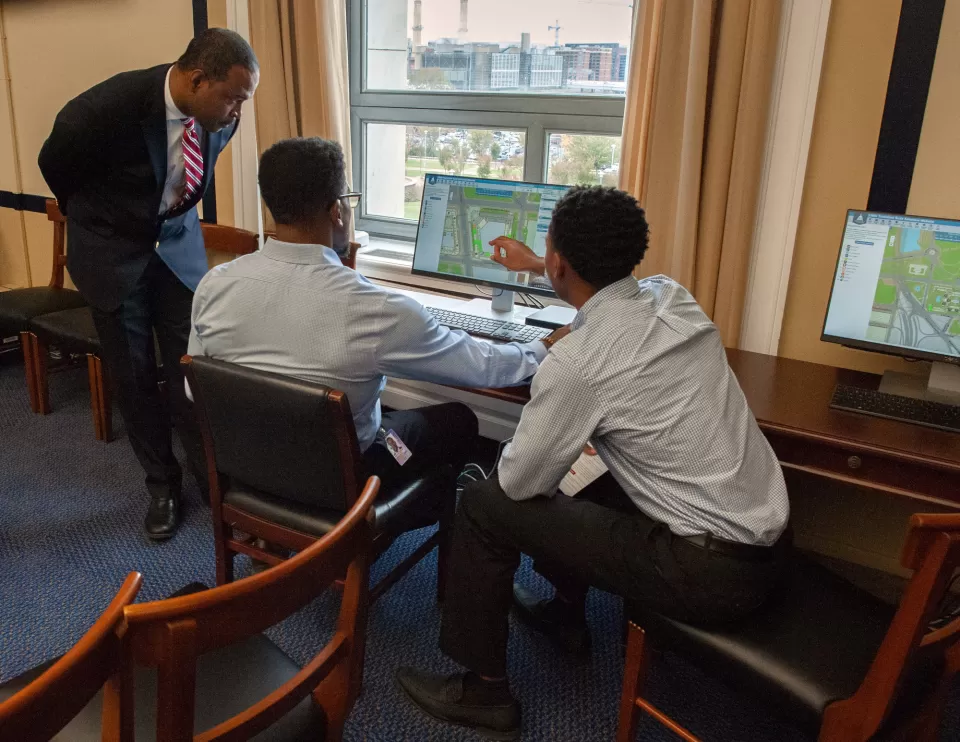
Staffers working with officials to select offices

As of 2022, the lottery takes place at the Cannon building, though it has also taken place at the Rayburn building. Numbered buttons are drawn from a wooden box, giving the order in which members can make selections. Representatives can send staffers in their stead; if nobody is present for a particular congressperson, they pick last. Some representatives and members of their staff prepare for the lottery by ranking possible choices, as they only have five minutes to choose afterwards; those decisions have been called "a slower, less exciting version of the NBA draft".

While the rooms in the Rayburn building generally rank highest in members' preferences due to the subway link, it is rare that new representatives are able to take offices there. In addition to the Cannon and Rayburn buildings, lawmakers can choose from offices in the Longworth building. The Evansville Courier & Press has called having a bad location the "congressional equivalent of being sent to Siberia"; though an official from the Architect of the Capitol has said that the best office is "the one you've been elected for. There is no bad office on the Hill".

In addition to location, considerations for office space have included whether there is present construction, how allergy-friendly it is, and the view, though Ted Yoho chose a room to be "up high and away from everybody". Jim Hagedorn chose his father's old room as tribute to him; others may choose rooms that belonged to historical figures like John F. Kennedy: for instance, Katie Hill swapped offices with Ayanna Pressley to allow Pressley to have Shirley Chisholm's old office.

The drawing is typically a theatrical event, where the crowd sympathizes with fortunate and unfortunate members, though members have subverted those emotions for comical effect, such as by Aaron Bean, who high-fived others after drawing 68th out of 73.

Instead of a lottery, the Senate assigns offices to new senators based on its seniority system.

== Superstitions ==
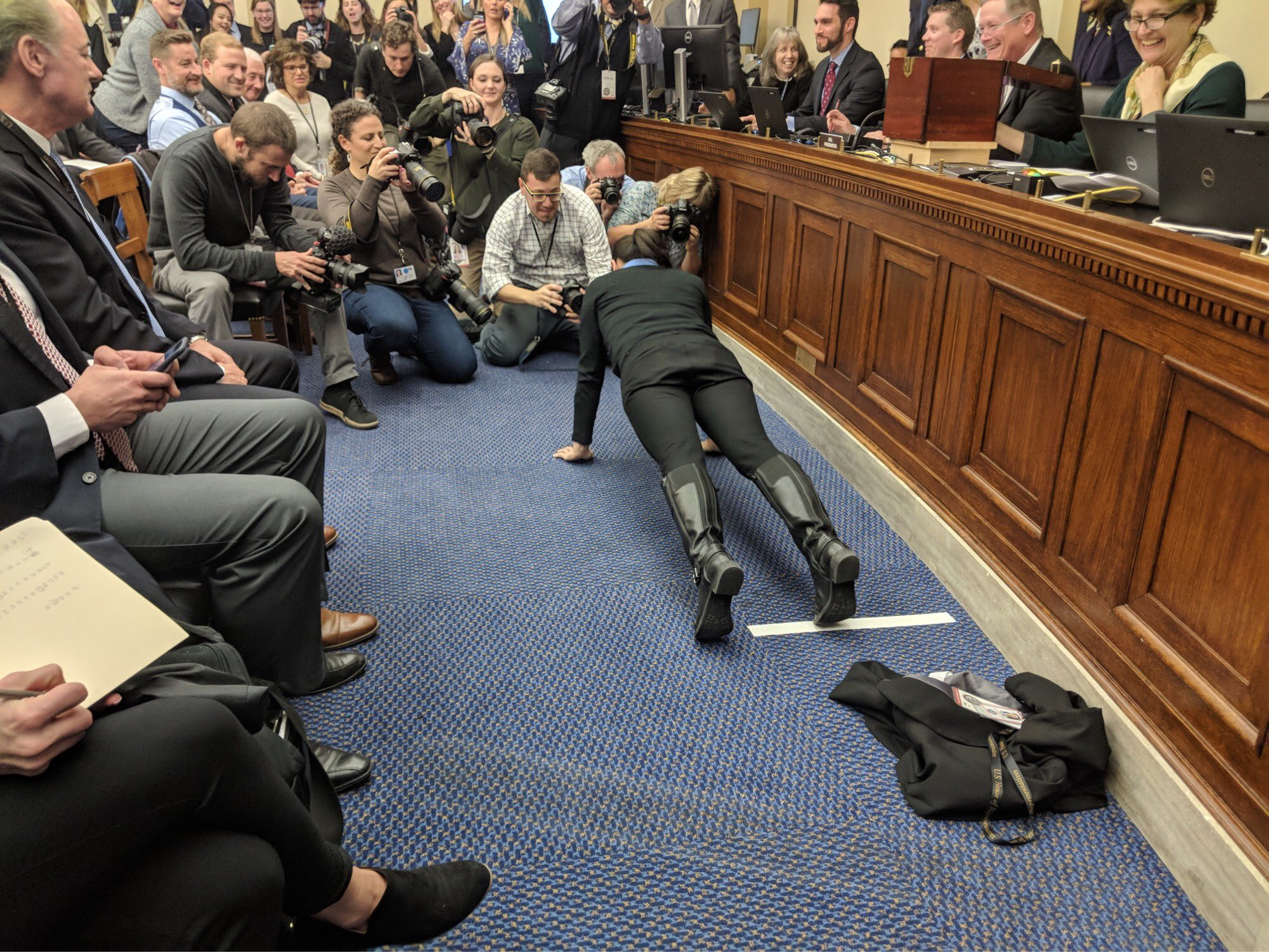
Sharice Davids doing push-ups prior to drawing her number

The organizers of the lottery hold that dances increase the chance of a low number, while Bloomberg observed in 2022 that a congressmember's name being mispronounced seemed to help their chances.

Prior to drawing, representatives and their staffers have performed rituals like playing a song by Frank Sinatra, rubbing a bald head, or doing push-ups. Steve Knight joked that he had done a Jedi mind trick to get the first pick in 2014, while 2010 lottery winner Cory Gardner said he had "practiced pulling tissues out of the box" and had pulled "20 to 25 until [he] decided that [his] form was good".

Members have also brought lucky charms, such as Abigail Spanberger's scarf with designs of the female candidates that year, quartz, or lucky jeans.
