= Texas's 38th congressional district =

U.S. House district for Texas

- Interactive map of district boundaries
- Representative: Wesley Hunt; R–Houston
- Population (2025): 811,864
- Median household income: $102,005
- Ethnicity: 50.1% White; 25.9% Hispanic; 10.1% Asian; 9.6% Black; 3.6% Two or more races; 0.7% other
- Cook PVI: R+10

Texas's 38th congressional district is a congressional district in Texas, covering parts of Harris County. It includes the Houston suburbs of Jersey Village, Cypress, Tomball, Greater Katy, and Klein. The Memorial Villages and a portion of the city of Houston are also located within the district.

The district was created in the redistricting after the 2020 census, where Texas gained two seats in the House. The district was first contested in the 2022 House elections, sending a member to the 118th United States Congress.

== History ==
The district was created as a result of the 2022 redistricting to account for rapid growth in Harris County during the previous decade, and includes many of the most Republican areas in Houston and Harris County, including much of the Katy Freeway corridor west of downtown Houston. The southern portion of the district - including Memorial City and the neighboring Memorial Villages, the Energy Corridor and the adjacent Addicks and Barker reservoirs, all or parts of the wealthy River Oaks, Rice Military and Tanglewood neighborhoods of west Houston, Memorial Park and the eastern parts of the Greater Katy area - was long considered the traditional base of the 7th district from 1967 to 2023 that was once the most Republican district in the Houston area, as well as the home district of former President George H. W. Bush during his presidency and post-presidential years. The northern portion of the district, which extends from the neighborhoods directly north of U.S. Highway 290 (known locally as the Northwest Freeway) including such suburbs as Jersey Village, Tomball, Klein and parts of Cypress, had boomeranged between several Republican-friendly districts over the years (mostly involving the 7th and 8th districts, as well as the 2nd and 10th districts during the first two decades of the 21st century), while otherwise maintaining their largely Republican leans as the area became increasingly suburbanized.

The district's first incumbent is Republican Wesley Hunt, an African-American Republican, former Army officer and West Point and Cornell University graduate who narrowly lost in the 7th District to one-term Democratic incumbent Lizzie Fletcher in 2020, the latter having defeated longtime Republican incumbent John Culberson in the same district two years prior; Hunt conceded the race the day after the election. Having initially being pegged for a rematch against Fletcher in 2022, Hunt wound up running in the new 38th District that was reportedly designed to elect him in redistricting talks (and which as aforementioned takes much of the historical west Houston base of the old 7th. Hunt easily won the 2022 Republican primary over nine other candidates with over 50 percent of the vote, and easily defeated former Spring Branch ISD superintendent Duncan Klussmann in the general election, becoming the first Black Republican to represent the Houston area in Congress since Reconstruction. Hunt, against the wishes of Republican Party leadership, decided to seek the Republican nomination for United States Senate in 2026, against incumbent senator John Cornyn and Texas attorney general Ken Paxton.

== Recent election results from statewide races ==
=== 2023–2027 boundaries ===
Year	Office	Results
2008	President	McCain 70–30%
2012	President	Romney 72–28%
2014	Senate	Cornyn 78–22%
2014	Governor	Abbott 73–27%
2016	President	Trump 61–34%
2018	Senate	Cruz 60–39%
2018	Governor	Abbott 65–33%
2018	Lt. Governor	Patrick 60–38%
2018	Attorney General	Paxton 59–38%
2018	Comptroller of Public Accounts	Hegar 64–33%
2020	President	Trump 58–40%
2020	Senate	Cornyn 61–37%
2022	Governor	Abbott 61–38%
2022	Lt. Governor	Patrick 59–38%
2022	Attorney General	Paxton 59–38%
2022	Comptroller of Public Accounts	Hegar 64–34%
2024	President	Trump 59–39%
2024	Senate	Cruz 57–41%

=== 2027–2033 boundaries ===
Year	Office	Results
2008	President	McCain 69–30%
2012	President	Romney 71–29%
2014	Senate	Cornyn 78–22%
2014	Governor	Abbott 73–27%
2016	President	Trump 61–34%
2018	Senate	Cruz 59–40%
2018	Governor	Abbott 65–34%
2018	Lt. Governor	Patrick 60–38%
2018	Attorney General	Paxton 59–39%
2018	Comptroller of Public Accounts	Hegar 64–34%
2020	President	Trump 58–40%
2020	Senate	Cornyn 61–37%
2022	Governor	Abbott 60–38%
2022	Lt. Governor	Patrick 59–38%
2022	Attorney General	Paxton 60–38%
2022	Comptroller of Public Accounts	Hegar 64–35%
2024	President	Trump 60–39%
2024	Senate	Cruz 57–41%
2026	Senate	Talarico 50–47%
2026	Governor	Abbott 51–48%

== Composition ==
For the 118th and successive Congresses (based on redistricting following the 2020 census), the district contains all or portions of the following counties and communities:

Harris County (9)

Bunker Hill Village, Hedwig Village, Hilshire Village, Houston (part; also 2nd, 7th, 8th, 9th, 18th, 22nd, 29th, 36th; shared with Fort Bend and Montgomery counties), Hunters Creek Village, Jersey Village, Piney Point Village (part; also 7th), Spring Valley Village, Tomball

== List of members representing the district ==
Representative (Residence)	Party	Years	Cong ress	Electoral history	District location
District established January 3, 2023
Wesley Hunt (Houston)	Republican	January 3, 2023 – present	118th 119th	Elected in 2022. Re-elected in 2024. Retiring to run for U.S. Senate.	2023–2027 Parts of Harris
Jon Bonck (Houston)	Republican	Assuming office on January 3, 2027		Elected in 2026.	2027–present Parts of Harris

== Election results ==
=== 2022 ===
Results of the 2022 election by precinct

2022 Texas's 38th congressional district election
Party	Candidate	Votes	%
Republican	Wesley Hunt	163,597	62.9
Democratic	Duncan Klussmann	92,302	35.5
Independent	Joel Dejean	3,970	1.5
Total votes		259,869	100.0
Republican win (new seat)			

=== 2024 ===
2024 Texas's 38th congressional district election
Party	Candidate	Votes	%
Republican	Wesley Hunt (incumbent)	214,076	62.9
Democratic	Melissa McDonough	126,408	37.1
Total votes		340,484	100.0
Republican hold			

== See also ==
- Texas's congressional districts
- List of United States congressional districts
