= Paul Dyson (politician) =

American politician

Member of the Texas House of Representatives from the 14th district
- Incumbent
- Assumed office January 14, 2025
- Succeeded by: John N. Raney

Personal details
- Born: July 10, 1980 (age 46)
- Party: Republican
- Spouse: Teri
- Children: 2
- Education: Texas A&M University (BS, MBA); South Texas College of Law Houston (JD)
- Occupation: Attorney
- Website: Campaign website

Paul Andrew Dyson (born July 10, 1980) is an American politician and attorney serving as a member of the Texas House of Representatives for the 14th district. A member of the Republican Party, he was elected in 2024 to succeed John N. Raney.

== Early life and career ==
Dyson graduated from Allen Academy in 1998. He then graduated from Texas A&M University with a Bachelor of Science in political science followed by an MBA. Dyson then earned his Juris Doctor from the South Texas College of Law Houston in 2007.

Dyson clerked for U.S. District Judge Leonard Davis in Tyler, Texas, then worked in the Houston offices of Porter Hedges, LLP and as a senior associate at Norton Rose Fulbright until 2014. He has since served as general counsel for his family-owned oil and gas exploration company Dyson Energy Group. In February 2022, American Momentum Bank announced it had appointed Dyson to the bank's board of directors.

== Political career ==
Dyson was first elected to the Texas House of Representatives in the 2024 election to succeed retiring incumbent John N. Raney.

Texas House of Representatives
Preceded by John N. Raney	Member of the Texas House of Representatives from the 14th district 2025–present	Incumbent
