= John N. Raney =

Businessman and Texas state legislator

John Raney

Member of the Texas House of Representatives from the 14th district
- In office December 23, 2011 – January 14, 2025
- Preceded by: Fred Brown
- Succeeded by: Paul Dyson

Personal details
- Born: John Nathan Raney; April 4, 1947 (age 79) Huntsville, Texas, U.S.
- Party: Republican
- Education: Texas A&M University
- Occupation: Owner of Texas Aggieland Bookstore in College Station

John Nathan Raney (born April 4, 1947) is a businessman in College Station, Texas, who is a former Republican member of the Texas House of Representatives for District 14, which encompasses Brazos County, including Bryan–College Station.

== Background ==
A sixth-generation Texan, Raney was born in Huntsville in Walker County and reared for several years on a farm in Madison County, which had been owned by his family for 125 years. In 1950, he moved back to Huntsville. In 1960, he relocated to Bryan, where he graduated in 1965 from the former Stephen F. Austin High School, renamed and consolidated in 1971 as Bryan High School. In 1969, Raney received a Bachelor of Business Administration degree from Texas A&M University, with a concentration in marketing. In June 1969, after his graduation from TAMU, Raney launched Aggieland Book Store, a business which he still operates. From 1969 to 1975, he was a first lieutenant in the Texas Army National Guard.

== Political career ==
Raney has been active in the Republican party since the early 1970s, including a stint as Chairman of the Republican Party of Brazos County.

2011

Representative Raney has served in the state House since December 23, 2011, having won with 58 percent of the vote in a special runoff election to fill the seat vacated by fellow Republican Fred Brown, whose tenure had extended from 1999 until his resignation in 2011.

2012

Raney won his first full term in the House on November 6, 2012, 60 to 36 percent, over Democrat Judy Le Unes. The Libertarian candidate, Joshua Baker, received the remaining 4 percent of the ballots cast.

2014

In 2014, Raney ran against Democrat Andrew Metscher, a Texas A&M student in economics. He defeated Metscher in the general election 68%–28%.

2016

Representative Raney faced a Republican primary opponent in the 2016 election cycle from former College Station City Councilman Jess Fields. Raney defeated Fields 68%-31%.

2018

Raney won again in the general election held on November 6, 2018. With 26,663 votes (56.4 percent), he defeated his Democratic opponent, Josh Wilkinson, who polled 20,647 votes (43.6 percent).

2022

Raney won against challenger John Harvey Slocum in the republican primary race on March 1, 2022.

== Policy positions ==
A member of the House committees on Administration, Appropriations, and Higher Education, Representative Raney supports tuition revenue bonds for public universities, the concealed-carry law in classrooms for the purpose of self-defense from attackers, and the prohibition of abortion after twenty weeks of gestation. Representative Raney authored a bill to allow Texas A&M University to lease and sell land on the main campus in College Station.

Representative Raney backed the approved 2013 Texas State Budget and legislation to assist College Station in the establishment of a medical district. He supports legislation to allow Brazos County to earmark specified hotel and motel sales taxes to underwrite part of the costs for renovations to Kyle Field at TAMU. Representative Raney supported legislation to increase funding of highways and transportation, securing the border with Mexico, and more funding for education at the vocational, technical, and higher levels.

Raney has received endorsements from Life PAC, Texas Alliance for Life, Texas Retailers Association, Texas Municipal Police Association, Texas Association of Business, Texas Association of Manufacturers, Combined Law Enforcement Associations of Texas, Texas Association of Realtors, National Rifle Association, Texas State Rifle Association, College Station Professional Firefighters Association, Bryan Professional Firefighters Association, National Federation of Business, Conservative Roundtable of Texas, Texans for Lawsuit Reform, Department of Public Safety Officers Association, Independent Bankers Association of Texas, A&M PAC, Texas Medical Association, Texas Farm Bureau, Texas Society of Professional Engineers, and others.

== Personal life ==
Raney met his wife, the former Elizabeth Hodges, at the 1972 Republican State Convention. The couple married in 1974 and have two daughters and sons-in-law, Beth and Grant Hawkins and Laura and Alex Scogin, and eight grandchildren.

Raney is affiliated with the Chamber of Commerce, the National Federation of Independent Business, and the Texas Retailers Association. He is active in the First United Methodist Church in Bryan.

Texas House of Representatives
Preceded by Fred Brown	Member of the Texas House of Representatives from the 14th district 2011–2025	Succeeded by Paul Dyson
