= Wesley Hunt =

American politician (born 1981)

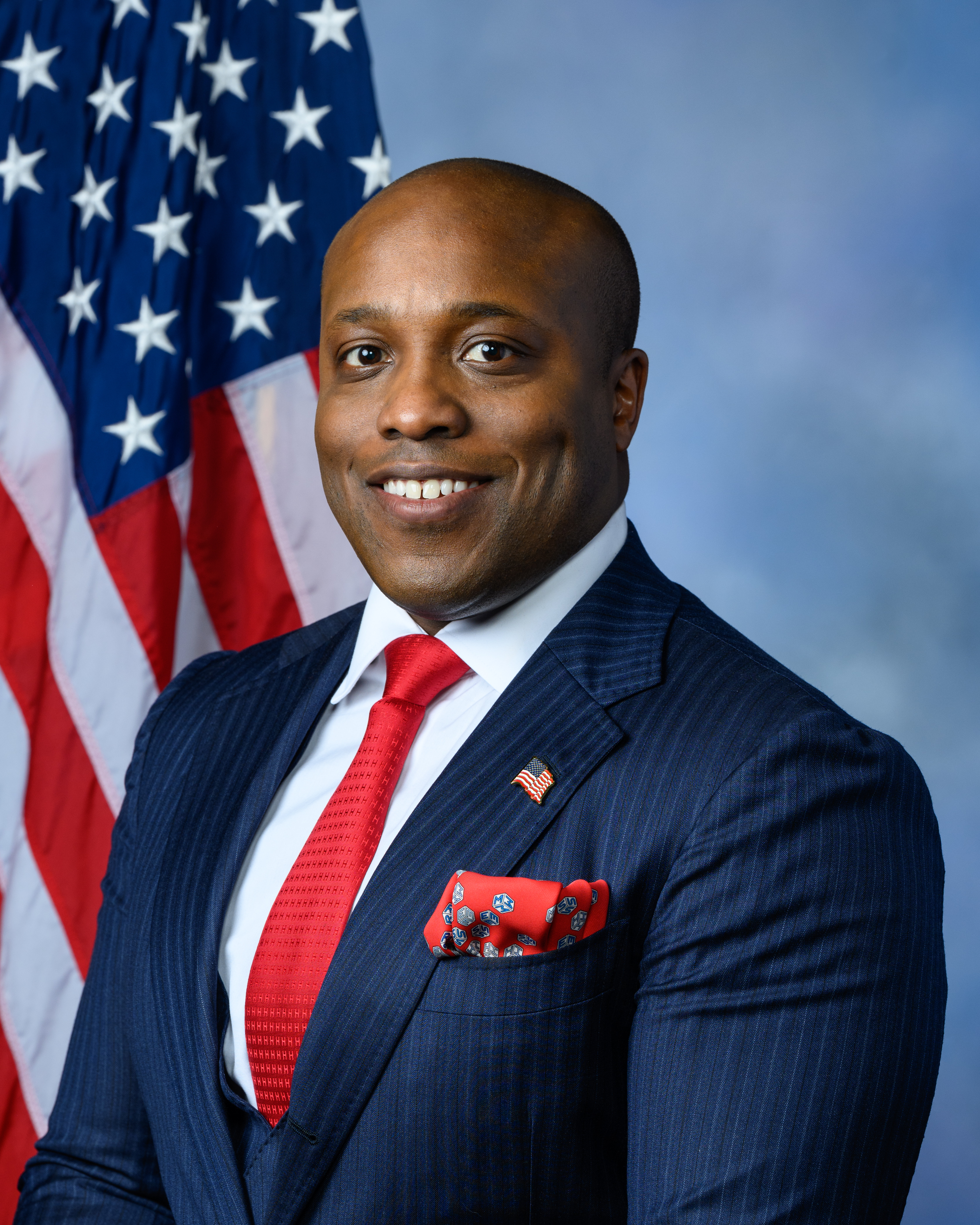
- Official portrait, 2022

United States Ambassador to Saudi Arabia
- Nominee
- Assuming office TBD
- President: Donald Trump
- Succeeding: Michael Ratney

Member of the U.S. House of Representatives from Texas's 38th district
- Incumbent
- Assumed office January 3, 2023
- Preceded by: Constituency established

Personal details
- Born: Wesley Parish Hunt; November 13, 1981 (age 45) Houston, Texas, U.S.
- Party: Republican
- Spouse: Emily Dague (m. 2018)
- Children: 3
- Education: United States Military Academy (BS); Cornell University (MBA, MPA, MILR)
- Website: House website Campaign website

Military service
- Branch/service: United States Army
- Years of service: 2004–2012
- Rank: Captain
- Unit: United States Army Aviation Branch
- Battles/wars: Iraq War

Wesley Parish Hunt (born November 13, 1981) is an American politician and former U.S. Army officer serving as the U.S. representative for Texas's 38th congressional district since 2023. A member of the Republican Party, he placed third in the Republican primary in the 2026 U.S. Senate election in Texas.

== Early life and education ==
Hunt was born and raised in Houston to a military family. After graduating from St. John's School, he attended the United States Military Academy, where he received a Bachelor of Science in leadership and management with mechanical engineering in 2004.

Hunt was commissioned into the U.S. Army in 2004 and flew Apache helicopters in the military. He was deployed once to Iraq and was deployed twice to Saudi Arabia as a diplomatic liaison officer. He left the army at the rank of captain in 2012.

After being honorably discharged, he attended Cornell University and obtained a Master of Business Administration, Master of Public Administration, and a Master of Industrial and Labor Relations.

== U.S. House of Representatives ==
=== Elections ===
==== 2020 ====
Hunt ran for Texas's 7th congressional district in the 2020 elections. In a field of six candidates, Hunt won the Republican primary election with 61% of the vote. He lost the general election to incumbent Democrat Lizzie Fletcher. Hunt conceded to Fletcher a day after the election.

==== 2022 ====
A day after redistricted maps were revealed, Hunt announced his intention to run in the new, solidly Republican 38th district. He defeated the Democratic nominee, Duncan Klussmann, in the November 8 general election, 63% to 35%.

=== Tenure ===
In January 2023, at the beginning of the 118th U.S. Congress, Hunt supported Kevin McCarthy for Speaker of the United States House of Representatives. Hunt is on the House Judiciary, Natural Resources and Small Business Committees. On the Small Business Committee he chairs the Rural Development, Energy, and Supply Chains

Hunt endorsed Donald Trump's campaign in the 2024 presidential election.

==== Syria ====
In 2023, Hunt was among 47 Republicans to vote in favor of H.Con.Res. 21, which directed President Joe Biden to remove U.S. troops from Syria within 180 days.

==== Fiscal Responsibility Act of 2023 ====
Hunt was among the 71 Republicans who voted against final passage of the Fiscal Responsibility Act of 2023 in the House.

== United States Ambassador to Saudi Arabia nomination ==
On September 14, 2026, President Donald Trump announced that he had nominated Hunt as the United States ambassador to Saudi Arabia.

== Personal life ==
Around the time of his arrival in Congress, Hunt's wife, Emily, gave birth to a son, who was born prematurely and needed time in the neonatal intensive care unit, forcing Hunt to leave the Speaker of the House election on its fourth day, missing the 12th and 13th ballots before returning the same day.

Hunt is a Baptist. He attended Champion Forest Baptist Church, which he has said shaped his beliefs.

== Electoral history ==
=== 2020 ===
Texas's 7th congressional district Republican primary, 2020
Party	Candidate	Votes	%
Republican	Wesley Hunt	28,060	61.0
Republican	Cindy Siegel	12,497	27.2
Republican	Maria Espinoza	2,716	5.9
Republican	Kyle Preston	1,363	3.0
Republican	Jim Noteware	937	2.0
Republican	Laique Rehman	424	0.9
Total votes		45,997	100.0

Texas's 7th congressional district, 2020
Party	Candidate	Votes	%
Democratic	Lizzie Fletcher (incumbent)	159,529	50.8
Republican	Wesley Hunt	149,054	47.4
Libertarian	Shawn Kelly	5,542	1.8
Total votes		314,125	100.0
Democratic hold			

=== 2022 ===
Texas's 38th congressional district Republican primary, 2022
Party	Candidate	Votes	%
Republican	Wesley Hunt	35,291	55.3%
Republican	Mark Ramsey	19,352	30.3%
Republican	David Hogan	3,125	4.9%
Republican	Ronald Lopez	2,048	3.2%
Republican	Brett Guillroy	1,416	2.2%
Republican	Jerry Ford, Sr.	997	1.6%
Republican	Richard Welch	633	1.0%
Republican	Alex Cross	460	0.7%
Republican	Damien Mockus	249	0.4%
Republican	Philip Covarrubias	228	0.4%
Total votes		63,799	100.0%

Texas’s 38th congressional district, 2022
Party	Candidate	Votes	%
Republican	Wesley Hunt	162,992	63.00
Democratic	Duncan Klussmann	91,768	35.47
Independent	Joel Dejean	3,953	1.53
Total votes		258,713	100
Republican win (new seat)			

=== 2024 ===
Texas's 38th congressional district election, 2024
Party	Candidate	Votes	%
Republican	Wesley Hunt (incumbent)	214,076	62.9
Democratic	Melissa McDonough	126,408	37.1
Total votes		340,484	100.0

=== 2026 ===
2026 United States Senate election in Texas Republican primary
Party	Candidate	Votes	%
Republican	John Cornyn (incumbent)	907,604	41.9
Republican	Ken Paxton	881,386	40.7
Republican	Wesley Hunt	292,728	13.5
Republican	Sara Canady	26,291	1.2
Republican	Anna Bender	24,415	1.1
Republican	Gulrez Khan	15,811	0.7
Republican	John Adefope	9,258	0.4
Republican	Virgil Bierschwale	9,016	0.4
Total votes		2,166,509	100.0

== See also ==
- List of African-American United States representatives

U.S. House of Representatives
New constituency	Member of the U.S. House of Representatives from Texas's 38th congressional district 2023–present	Incumbent
U.S. order of precedence (ceremonial)
Preceded by Val Hoyle	United States representatives by seniority 316th	Succeeded by Glenn Ivey
