= 2018 United States House of Representatives elections in Texas =

- November 6, 2018

All 36 Texas seats to the United States House of Representatives
- Turnout: 52.8%
	Majority party	Minority party
Party	Republican	Democratic
Last election	25	11
Seats won	23	13
Seat change	▼2	▲2
Popular vote	4,135,359	3,852,752
Percentage	50.41%	46.97%
Swing	▼6.8%	▲9.9%
Republican
40–50%
50–60%
60–70%
70–80%
80–90%
>90%
Democratic
40–50%
50–60%
60–70%
70–80%
80–90%
90>%
Democratic
Hold
Gain
Republican
Hold
Republican
40–50%
50–60%
60–70%
70–80%
80–90%
>90%
Democratic
40–50%
50–60%
60–70%
70–80%
80–90%
90>%
Popular vote by congressional district. As this is a first-past-the-post election, seat totals are not determined by total popular vote in the state, but instead by results in each congressional district.

The 2018 United States House of Representatives elections in Texas were held on Tuesday, November 6, 2018. Voters elected the 36 U.S. representatives from the state of Texas, one from each of the state's 36 congressional districts. The elections coincided with the elections of other offices, including the gubernatorial election, as well as other elections to the House of Representatives, elections to the United States Senate, and various state and local elections. The primaries were held on March 6 and the run-offs were held on May 22.

In 2018, for the first time in at least 25 years, the Texas Democratic Party fielded at least one candidate in each of the state's 36 congressional districts. The state congressional delegation changed from a 25–11 Republican majority to a 23–13 Republican majority, the most seats that Democrats had won in the state since 2006. Democrats won almost 47% of the vote, likely due to the down-ballot effect of Representative Beto O'Rourke's Senate candidacy, in which he won 48.3% of the vote, but also because four Democratic incumbents faced no Republican opposition in their general elections.

Turnout was also more than doubled from the last midterm election.

== Overview ==
=== Statewide ===
Party	Candidates	Votes		Seats		
Party	Candidates	No.	%	No.	+/–	%
Republican	32	4,135,359	50.41%	23	▼2	63.9%
Democratic	36	3,852,752	46.97%	13	▲2	36.1%
Libertarian	31	190,816	2.33%	0	Steady	0.0%
Independent	6	23,352	0.28%	0	Steady	0.0%
Write-in	4	429	0.0%	0	Steady	0.00%
Total	109	8,202,708	100.0%	36	Steady	100.0%

Popular vote
Republican	50.41%
Democratic	46.97%
Libertarian	2.33%
Independent	0.28%
Write-in	0.00%

House seats
Republican	63.89%
Democratic	36.11%

=== District ===
Results of the 2018 United States House of Representatives elections in Texas by district:

District	Republican		Democratic		Others		Total		Result
District	Votes	%	Votes	%	Votes	%	Votes	%	Result
District 1	168,165	72.26%	61,263	26.32%	3,292	1.41%	232,720	100.0%	Republican hold
District 2	139,188	52.84%	119,992	45.56%	4,212	1.60%	263,392	100.0%	Republican hold
District 3	169,520	54.27%	138,234	44.25%	4,604	1.47%	312,358	100.0%	Republican hold
District 4	188,667	75.70%	57,400	23.03%	3,178	1.28%	249,245	100.0%	Republican hold
District 5	130,617	62.34%	78,666	37.55%	224	0.11%	209,507	100.0%	Republican hold
District 6	135,961	53.10%	116,350	45.44%	3,731	1.46%	256,042	100.0%	Republican hold
District 7	115,642	47.47%	127,959	52.53%	0	0.00%	243,601	100.0%	Democratic gain
District 8	200,619	73.44%	67,930	24.87%	4,621	1.69%	273,170	100.0%	Republican hold
District 9	0	0.00%	136,256	89.06%	16,745	10.94%	153,001	100.0%	Democratic hold
District 10	157,166	51.06%	144,034	46.79%	6,627	2.15%	307,827	100.0%	Republican hold
District 11	176,603	80.14%	40,631	18.44%	3,143	1.43%	220,377	100.0%	Republican hold
District 12	172,557	64.27%	90,994	33.89%	4,940	1.84%	268,491	100.0%	Republican hold
District 13	169,027	81.54%	35,083	16.93%	3,175	1.53%	207,285	100.0%	Republican hold
District 14	138,942	59.24%	92,212	39.32%	3,374	1.44%	234,528	100.0%	Republican hold
District 15	63,862	38.75%	98,333	59.67%	2,607	1.58%	164,802	100.0%	Democratic hold
District 16	49,127	27.03%	124,437	68.46%	8,190	4.51%	181,754	100.0%	Democratic hold
District 17	134,841	56.81%	98,070	41.32%	4,440	1.87%	237,351	100.0%	Republican hold
District 18	38,368	20.81%	138,704	75.25%	7,260	3.94%	184,332	100.0%	Democratic hold
District 19	151,946	75.23%	50,039	24.77%	0	0.00%	201,985	100.0%	Republican hold
District 20	0	0.00%	139,038	80.85%	32,925	19.15%	171,963	100.0%	Democratic hold
District 21	177,654	50.24%	168,421	47.63%	7,542	2.13%	353,617	100.0%	Republican hold
District 22	152,750	51.36%	138,153	46.45%	6,502	2.19%	297,405	100.0%	Republican hold
District 23	103,285	49.17%	102,359	48.73%	4,425	2.11%	210,069	100.0%	Republican hold
District 24	133,317	50.61%	125,231	47.54%	4,870	1.85%	263,418	100.0%	Republican hold
District 25	163,023	53.53%	136,385	44.78%	5,145	1.69%	304,553	100.0%	Republican hold
District 26	185,551	59.38%	121,938	39.02%	5,016	1.61%	312,505	100.0%	Republican hold
District 27	125,118	60.32%	75,929	36.61%	6,374	3.07%	207,421	100.0%	Republican hold
District 28	0	0.00%	117,494	84.39%	21,732	15.61%	139,226	100.0%	Democratic hold
District 29	28,098	23.91%	88,188	75.06%	1,208	1.03%	117,494	100.0%	Democratic hold
District 30	0	0.00%	166,784	91.05%	16,390	8.95%	183,174	100.0%	Democratic hold
District 31	144,680	50.59%	136,362	47.68%	4,965	1.74%	286,007	100.0%	Republican hold
District 32	126,101	45.75%	144,067	52.27%	5,452	1.98%	275,620	100.0%	Democratic gain
District 33	26,120	21.91%	90,805	76.16%	2,299	1.93%	119,224	100.0%	Democratic hold
District 34	57,243	40.01%	85,825	59.99%	0	0.00%	143,068	100.0%	Democratic hold
District 35	50,553	26.05%	138,278	71.25%	5,236	2.70%	194,067	100.0%	Democratic hold
District 36	161,048	72.56%	60,908	27.44%	0	0.00%	221,956	100.0%	Republican hold
Total	4,135,359	50.41%	3,852,752	46.97%	214,597	2.62%	8,202,708	100.0%	

== District 1 ==
2018 Texas's 1st congressional district election
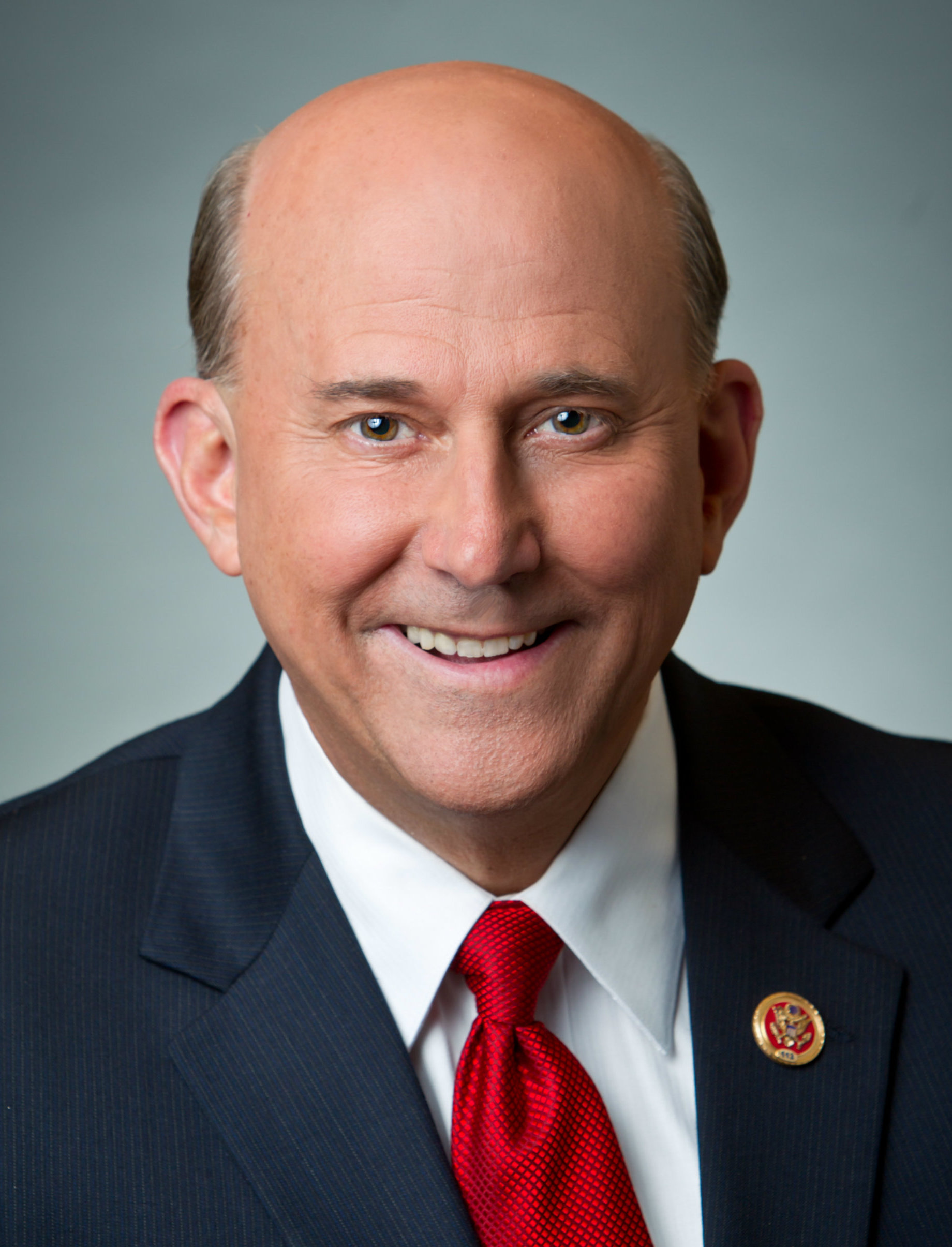

Nominee	Louie Gohmert	Shirley McKellar
Party	Republican	Democratic
Popular vote	168,165	61,263
Percentage	72.3%	26.3%
- County results Gohmert: 60–70% 70–80% 80–90%
U.S. Representative before election
Louie Gohmert
Republican
Elected U.S. Representative
Louie Gohmert
Republican

The first district is located in East Texas, including Deep East Texas, and takes in Longview, Lufkin, and Tyler. Incumbent Republican Louie Gohmert, who had represented the district since 2005, ran for re-election. He was re-elected with 73.9% of the vote in 2016. The district had a PVI of R+25.

=== Republican primary ===
==== Candidates ====
===== Nominee =====
- Louie Gohmert, incumbent U.S. representative

===== Declined =====
- Anthony Culler
- Roshin Rowjee, physician

==== Results ====
Republican primary results
Party	Candidate	Votes	%
Republican	Louie Gohmert (incumbent)	64,004	88.3
Republican	Anthony Culler	6,504	9.0
Republican	Roshin Rowjee	1,955	2.7
Total votes		72,463	100

=== Democratic primary ===
==== Candidates ====
===== Nominee =====
- Shirley McKellar, Army veteran, non-profit businesswoman and nominee for this seat in 2012, 2014 & 2016

===== Eliminated in primary =====
- Brent Beal, professor

==== Results ====
Democratic primary results
Party	Candidate	Votes	%
Democratic	Shirley McKellar	9,181	61.0
Democratic	Brent Beal	5,858	39.0
Total votes		15,039	100

=== Libertarian primary ===
==== Candidates ====
===== Nominee =====
- Jeff Callaway, Texas outlaw poet

=== General election ===
==== Predictions ====
Source	Ranking	As of
The Cook Political Report	Safe R	November 5, 2018
Inside Elections	Safe R	November 5, 2018
Sabato's Crystal Ball	Safe R	November 5, 2018
RCP	Safe R	November 5, 2018
Daily Kos	Safe R	November 5, 2018
538	Safe R	November 7, 2018
CNN	Safe R	October 31, 2018
Politico	Safe R	November 4, 2018

==== Endorsements ====
Louie Gohmert (R)

Organizations

- House Freedom Caucus
Shirley McKellar (D)

Labor unions

- AFL-CIO
- International Brotherhood of Boilermakers

==== Results ====
Texas's 1st congressional district, 2018
Party	Candidate	Votes	%
Republican	Louie Gohmert (incumbent)	168,165	72.3
Democratic	Shirley McKellar	61,263	26.3
Libertarian	Jeff Callaway	3,292	1.4
Total votes		232,720	100
Republican hold			

== District 2 ==
2018 Texas's 2nd congressional district election
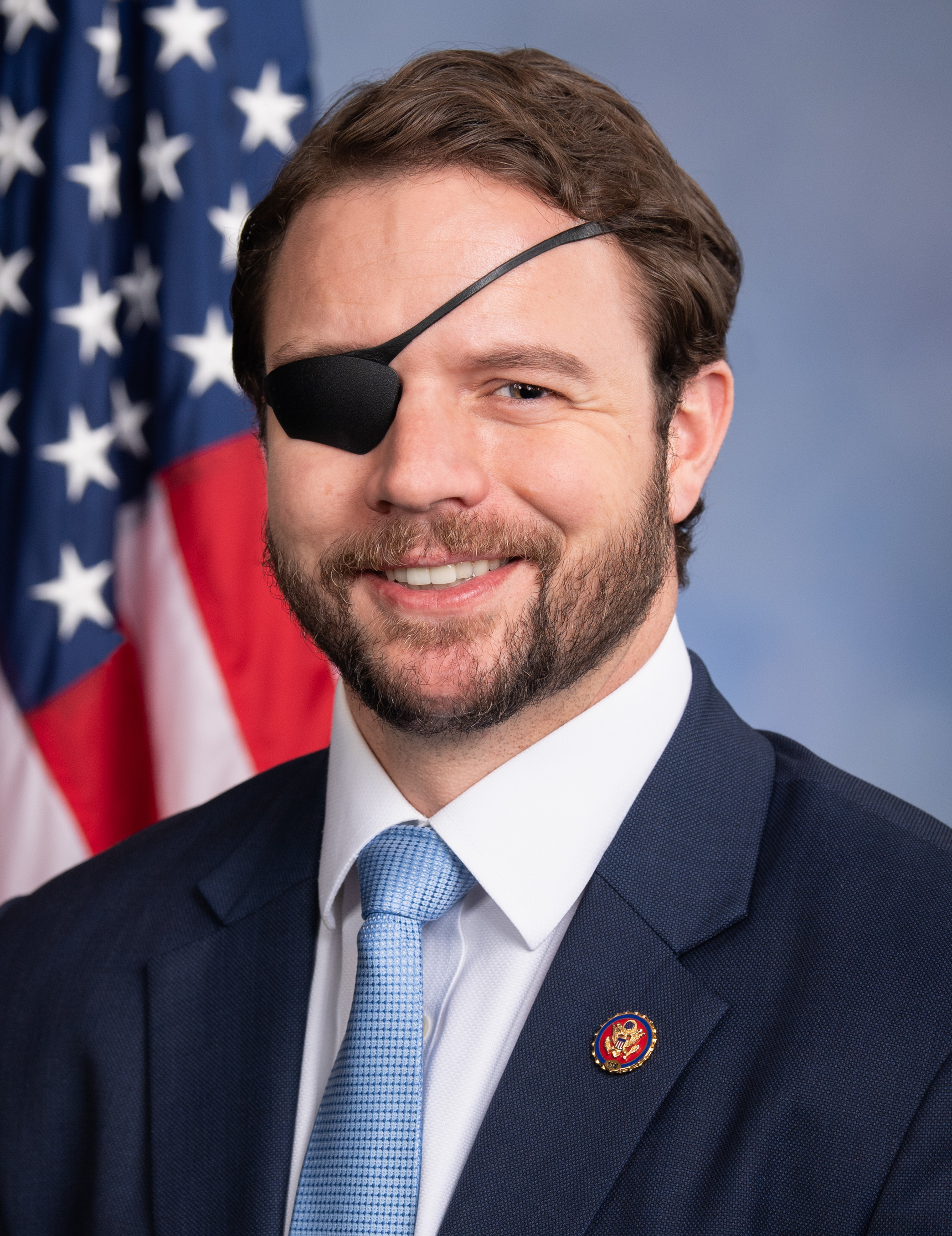

Nominee	Dan Crenshaw	Todd Litton
Party	Republican	Democratic
Popular vote	139,188	119,992
Percentage	52.8%	45.6%
- County result Crenshaw: 50–60%
U.S. Representative before election
Ted Poe
Republican
Elected U.S. Representative
Dan Crenshaw
Republican

This district is located in Greater Houston, including parts of northern and western Houston, as well as Humble, Kingwood, and Spring. Incumbent Republican Ted Poe, who had represented the district since 2005, did not run for re-election. He was re-elected with 60.6% of the vote in 2016. The district had a PVI of R+11.

=== Republican primary ===
==== Candidates ====
===== Nominee =====
- Dan Crenshaw, retired U.S. Navy lieutenant commander and former Navy SEAL

===== Eliminated in primary =====
- David Balat, healthcare executive
- Johnny Havens, attorney and retired U.S. Army captain
- Justin Lurie, investment banker
- Kevin Roberts, state representative
- Jon Spiers, surgeon
- Rick Walker, businessman and retired U.S. Army Reserve captain
- Kathaleen Wall, activist and fundraiser
- Malcolm Whittaker, patent lawyer

===== Declined =====
- Ted Poe, incumbent U.S. representative

==== Endorsements ====
Dan Crenshaw

U.S. representatives

- Mary Bono, representative for California's 45th congressional district (1998–2013)
- Pete Sessions, representative for Texas's 32nd congressional district (1993–present)
- Scott Taylor, representative for Virginia's 2nd congressional district (2017–present)

Organizations

- With Honor Fund

Individuals

- Buzz Aldrin, retired astronaut
- Hugh Hewitt, conservative radio talk show host, attorney, academic and author
Kevin Roberts

State legislators

- Gary Elkins, state representative

Labor unions

- Fraternal Order of Police

Organizations

- NRA Political Victory Fund
- Texas Alliance for Life

Newspapers

- Houston Chronicle
Kathaleen Wall

U.S. senators

- Ted Cruz, senator (R-TX)

U.S. representatives

- Cathy McMorris Rodgers, representative for Washington's 5th congressional district (2005–present)
- Randy Weber, representative for Texas's 14th congressional district (2013–present)

State officials

- Greg Abbott, governor of Texas
- Ken Paxton, state attorney general

State legislators

- Joan Huffman, state senator

Organizations

- Susan B. Anthony List
- Texas Right to Life

==== Results ====
Republican primary results
Party	Candidate	Votes	%
Republican	Kevin Roberts	15,236	33.0
Republican	Dan Crenshaw	12,644	27.4
Republican	Kathaleen Wall	12,499	27.1
Republican	Rick Walker	3,315	7.2
Republican	Johnny Havens	934	2.0
Republican	Justin Lurie	425	0.9
Republican	Jon Spiers	417	0.9
Republican	David Balat	348	0.8
Republican	Malcolm Whittaker	322	0.7
Total votes		46,140	100

==== Runoff results ====
Republican primary runoff results
Party	Candidate	Votes	%
Republican	Dan Crenshaw	20,322	69.9
Republican	Kevin Roberts	8,760	30.1
Total votes		29,082	100

=== Democratic primary ===
==== Candidates ====
===== Nominee =====
- Todd Litton, former chair of the City of Houston's Tower Commission

===== Eliminated in primary =====
- Darnell Jones, retired U.S. Navy lieutenant commander
- Ali Khorasani, field service engineer
- Silky Malik, author
- H.P. Parvizian, franchise owner

==== Endorsements ====
Ali Khorasani

Organizations

- Our Revolution
Darnell Jones

Organizations

- Brand New Congress
- Justice Democrats
Todd Litton

Labor unions

- AFL-CIO

Newspapers

- Houston Chronicle

==== Results ====
Democratic primary results
Party	Candidate	Votes	%
Democratic	Todd Litton	15,113	52.8
Democratic	Darnell Jones	6,308	22.1
Democratic	Silky Malik	2,770	9.7
Democratic	H. P. Parvizian	2,259	7.9
Democratic	Ali Khorasani	2,148	7.5
Total votes		28,598	100

=== Libertarian primary ===
==== Candidates ====
===== Nominee =====
- Patrick Gunnels

===== Eliminated in primary =====
- James Kong

=== General election ===
==== Endorsements ====
Dan Crenshaw (R)

U.S. representatives

- Mary Bono, representative for California's 45th congressional district (1998–2013)
- Pete Sessions, representative for Texas's 32nd congressional district (1993–present)
- Scott Taylor, representative for Virginia's 2nd congressional district (2017–present)

Organizations

- With Honor Fund

Individuals

- Buzz Aldrin, retired astronaut
- Hugh Hewitt, conservative radio talk show host, attorney, academic and author
Todd Litton (D)

Labor unions

- AFL-CIO
- International Brotherhood of Boilermakers

Organizations

- Democratic Congressional Campaign Committee "Red to Blue" Program
- End Citizens United

Newspapers

- Houston Chronicle

==== Predictions ====
Source	Ranking	As of
The Cook Political Report	Likely R	November 5, 2018
Inside Elections	Safe R	November 5, 2018
Sabato's Crystal Ball	Likely R	November 5, 2018
RCP	Safe R	November 5, 2018
Daily Kos	Likely R	November 5, 2018
538	Likely R	November 7, 2018
CNN	Safe R	October 31, 2018
Politico	Likely R	November 4, 2018

==== Results ====
Texas's 2nd congressional district, 2018
Party	Candidate	Votes	%
Republican	Dan Crenshaw	139,188	52.8
Democratic	Todd Litton	119,992	45.6
Libertarian	Patrick Gunnels	2,373	0.9
Independent	Scott Cubbler	1,839	0.7
Total votes		263,392	100.0
Republican hold			

== District 3 ==
2018 Texas's 3rd congressional district election
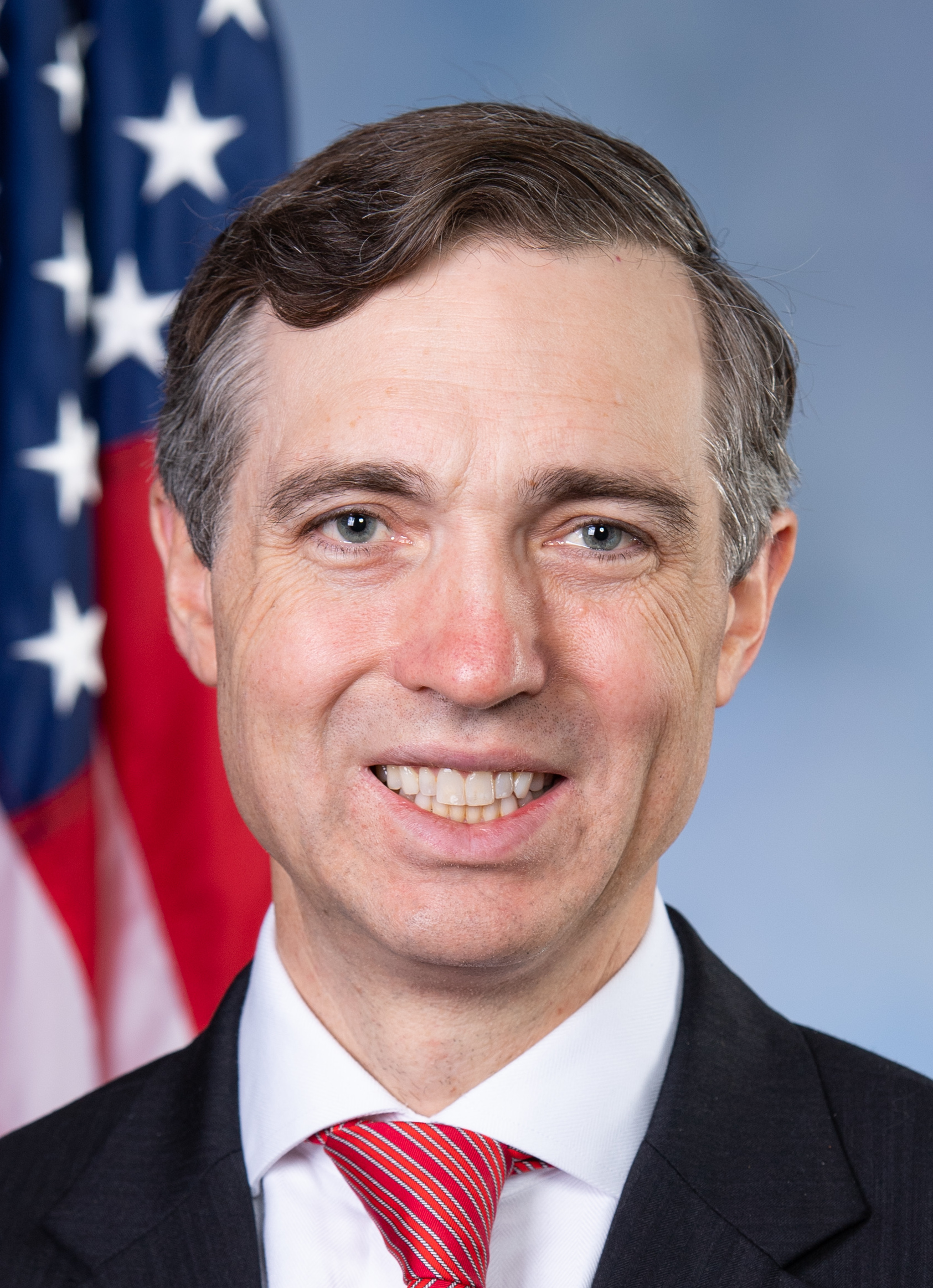

Nominee	Van Taylor	Lorie Burch
Party	Republican	Democratic
Popular vote	169,520	138,234
Percentage	54.2%	44.2%
- County results Taylor: 50–60%
U.S. Representative before election
Sam Johnson
Republican
Elected U.S. Representative
Van Taylor
Republican

The 3rd district is located in the Dallas–Fort Worth metroplex, including the Dallas suburbs of Frisco, McKinney, and Plano. Incumbent Republican Sam Johnson, who had represented the district since 1991, did not run for re-election. He was re-elected with 61.2% of the vote in 2016. The district had a PVI of R+13.

=== Republican primary ===
==== Candidates ====
===== Nominee =====
- Van Taylor, state senator for the 8th district

===== Eliminated in primary =====
- Roger Barone, businessman
- Alex Donkervoet, actuary

===== Declined =====
- Sam Johnson, incumbent U.S. representative

==== Endorsements ====
Van Taylor

Newspapers

- Dallas Morning News

==== Results ====
Republican primary results
Party	Candidate	Votes	%
Republican	Van Taylor	45,475	84.7
Republican	David Niederkorn	5,052	9.4
Republican	Alex Donkervoet	3,185	5.9
Total votes		53,712	100

=== Democratic primary ===
==== Candidates ====
===== Nominee =====
- Lorie Burch, LGBT rights attorney

===== Eliminated in primary =====
- Adam Bell, businessman and nominee for this seat in 2016
- Sam Johnson, attorney
- Medrick Yhap, mortgage consultant

==== Endorsements ====
Lorie Burch

Organizations

- Justice Democrats

Newspapers

- Dallas Morning News

==== Results ====
Democratic primary results
Party	Candidate	Votes	%
Democratic	Lorie Burch	15,468	49.6
Democratic	Sam Johnson	8,943	28.7
Democratic	Adam Bell	5,598	17.9
Democratic	Medrick Yhap	1,172	3.8
Total votes		31,181	100

==== Runoff results ====
Democratic primary runoff results
Party	Candidate	Votes	%
Democratic	Lorie Burch	9,344	75.0
Democratic	Sam Johnson	3,107	25.0
Total votes		12,451	100

=== Libertarian primary ===
==== Candidates ====
===== Nominee =====
- Christopher Claytor

===== Eliminated in primary =====
- Scott Jameson

==== Results ====
Christopher Claytor was declared the nominee by defeating Scott Jameson at the Collin County Libertarian Party Convention on Saturday, March 17.

=== Independents ===
- Roger Barone
- Robert Mason (Humane Party) (Note: Humane Party does not have ballot access. Appears on ballot as "Independent.")

=== General election ===
==== Endorsements ====
Van Taylor (R)

Organizations

- With Honor Fund

Newspapers

- Dallas Morning News
Lorie Burch (D)

Organizations

- Justice Democrats
- MoveOn

==== Predictions ====
Source	Ranking	As of
The Cook Political Report	Safe R	November 5, 2018
Inside Elections	Safe R	November 5, 2018
Sabato's Crystal Ball	Safe R	November 5, 2018
RCP	Safe R	November 5, 2018
Daily Kos	Safe R	November 5, 2018
538	Safe R	November 7, 2018
CNN	Safe R	October 31, 2018
Politico	Likely R	November 4, 2018

==== Results ====
Texas's 3rd congressional district, 2018
Party	Candidate	Votes	%
Republican	Van Taylor	169,520	54.2
Democratic	Lorie Burch	138,234	44.2
Libertarian	Christopher Claytor	4,604	1.5
Independent	Jeff Simons (write-in)	153	0.1
Total votes		312,511	100
Republican hold			

== District 4 ==
2018 Texas's 4th congressional district election
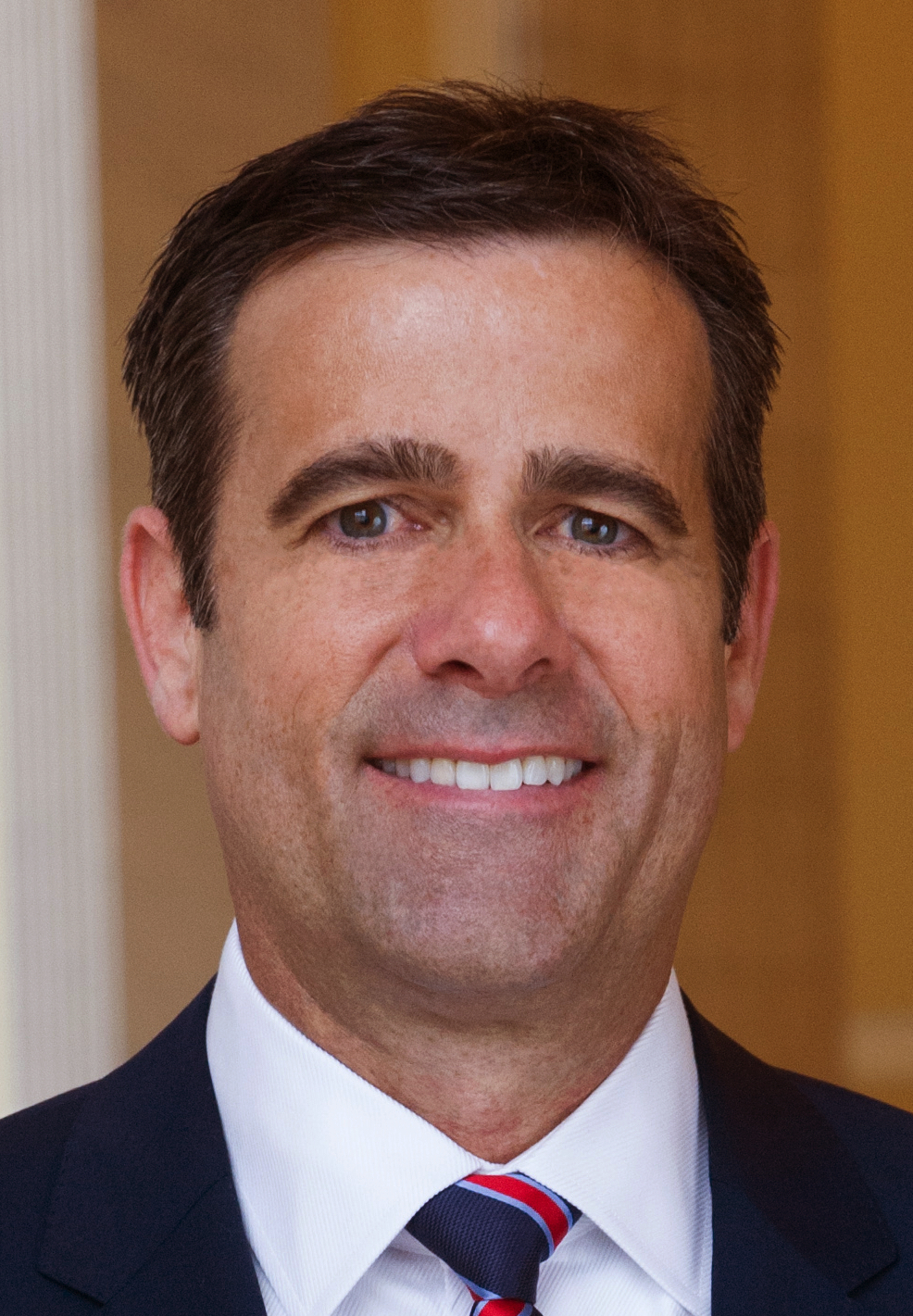

Nominee	John Ratcliffe	Catherine Krantz
Party	Republican	Democratic
Popular vote	188,667	57,400
Percentage	75.7%	23.0%
- County results Ratcliffe: 70–80% 80–90%
U.S. Representative before election
John Ratcliffe
Republican
Elected U.S. Representative
John Ratcliffe
Republican

The 4th district is located in Northern and Northeastern Texas, including Paris, Sherman, and Texarkana. Incumbent Republican John Ratcliffe, who had represented the district since 2015, ran for re-election. He was re-elected with 88.0% of the vote in 2016. The district had a PVI of R+28, making it one of the most conservative districts in the nation.

=== Republican primary ===
==== Candidates ====
===== Nominee =====
- John Ratcliffe, incumbent U.S. representative

===== Eliminated in primary =====
- John Cooper, pastor and engineer

==== Endorsements ====
John Ratcliffe

Newspapers

- Dallas Morning News

==== Results ====
Republican primary results
Party	Candidate	Votes	%
Republican	John Ratcliffe (incumbent)	63,105	85.5
Republican	John Cooper	10,699	14.5
Total votes		73,804	100.0

=== Democratic primary ===
==== Candidates ====
===== Nominee =====
- Catherine Krantz, event producer and publisher

===== Eliminated in primary =====
- Lander Bethel, pastor

==== Endorsements ====
Lander Bethel

Newspapers

- Dallas Morning News

==== Results ====
Democratic primary results
Party	Candidate	Votes	%
Democratic	Catherine Krantz	8,995	68.6
Democratic	Lander Bethel	4,109	31.4
Total votes		13,104	100

=== Libertarian primary ===
==== Candidates ====
===== Nominee =====
- Ken Ashby, teacher

=== General election ===
==== Predictions ====
Source	Ranking	As of
The Cook Political Report	Safe R	November 5, 2018
Inside Elections	Safe R	November 5, 2018
Sabato's Crystal Ball	Safe R	November 5, 2018
RCP	Safe R	November 5, 2018
Daily Kos	Safe R	November 5, 2018
538	Safe R	November 7, 2018
CNN	Safe R	October 31, 2018
Politico	Safe R	November 4, 2018

==== Endorsements ====
John Ratcliffe (R)

Newspapers

- Dallas Morning News

==== Results ====
Texas's 4th congressional district, 2018
Party	Candidate	Votes	%
Republican	John Ratcliffe (incumbent)	188,667	75.7
Democratic	Catherine Krantz	57,400	23.0
Libertarian	Ken Ashby	3,178	1.3
Total votes		249,245	100
Republican hold			

== District 5 ==
2018 Texas's 5th congressional district election
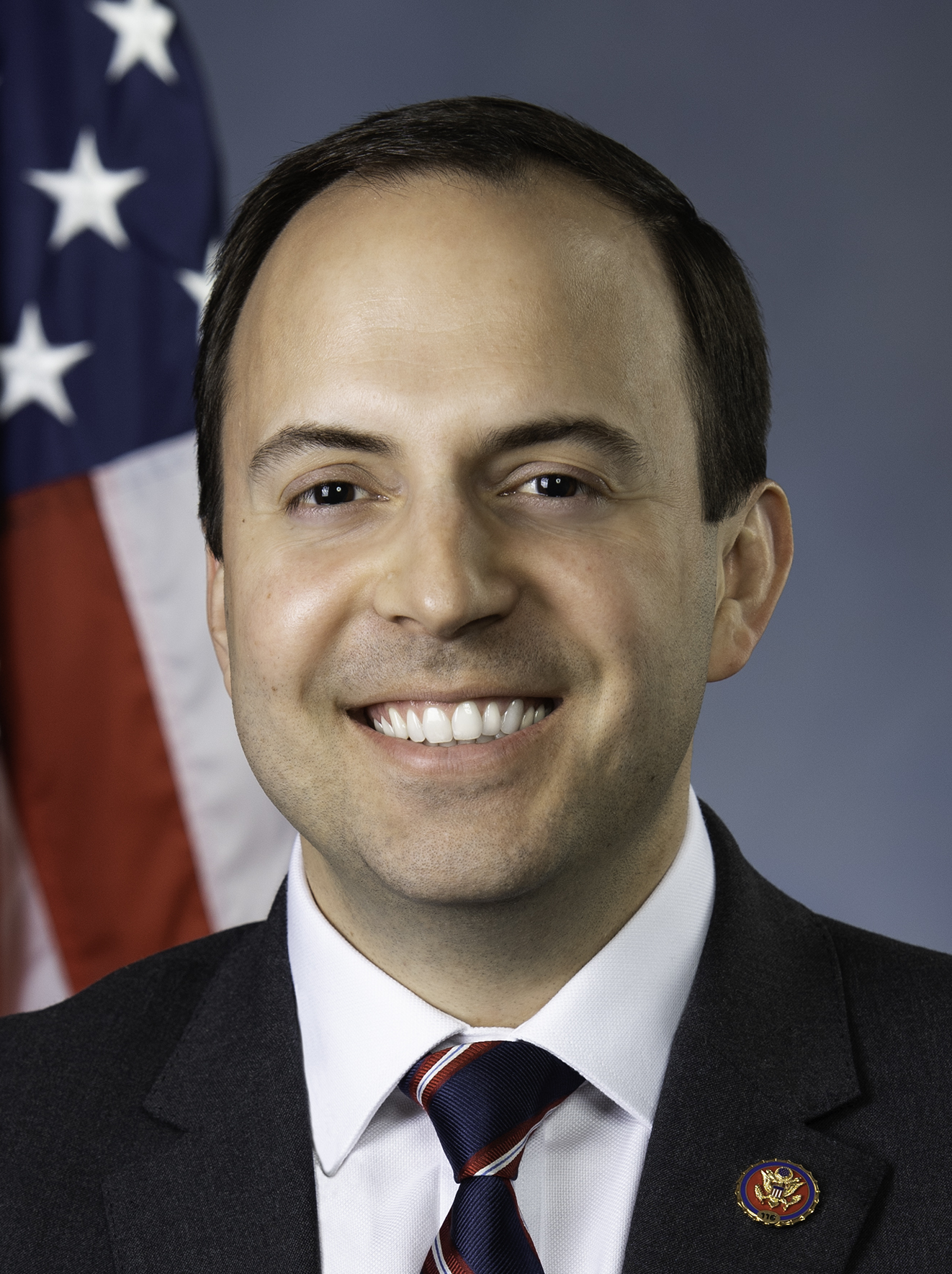

Nominee	Lance Gooden	Dan Wood
Party	Republican	Democratic
Popular vote	130,617	78,666
Percentage	62.3%	37.6%
- County results Gooden: 70–80% 80–90% Wood: 50–60%
U.S. Representative before election
Jeb Hensarling
Republican
Elected U.S. Representative
Lance Gooden
Republican

The 5th district stretches from the eastern Dallas suburbs, including Mesquite, down into East Texas, including Athens and Palestine. Incumbent Republican Jeb Hensarling, who had represented the district since 2003, announced in October 2017 that he was going to retire and not seek re-election to another term. He was re-elected with 80.6% of the vote in 2016. The district had a PVI of R+16.

=== Republican primary ===
==== Candidates ====
===== Nominee =====
- Lance Gooden, state representative

===== Eliminated in primary =====
- Danny Campbell, US Army veteran and business owner
- Sam Deen, US Army veteran and business owner
- Charles Lingerfelt, teacher, principal and nominee for the 30th district in 2019
- Bunni Pounds, business owner and activist
- Kenneth Sheets, former state representative
- David Williams, healthcare industry professional
- Jason Wright, former staffer for Ted Cruz

===== Declined =====
- Jeb Hensarling, incumbent U.S. representative

==== Endorsements ====
Bunni Pounds

U.S. senators

- Phil Gramm, former US senator

U.S. representatives

- Mia Love (R-UT)
- Mark Meadows (R-NC), chair of the House Freedom Caucus

Organizations

- Texas Right to Life
Kenneth Sheets

U.S. representatives

- Pete Sessions (R-TX)

Organizations

- With Honor Fund

Newspapers

- Dallas Morning News
Jason Wright

U.S. senators

- Ted Cruz, US senator

==== Results ====
Republican primary results
Party	Candidate	Votes	%
Republican	Lance Gooden	17,501	29.9
Republican	Bunni Pounds	12,895	22.0
Republican	Sam Deen	10,102	17.2
Republican	Kenneth Sheets	7,011	12.0
Republican	Jason Wright	6,675	11.4
Republican	Danny Campbell	1,767	3.0
Republican	David Williams	1,603	2.7
Republican	Charles Lingerfelt	1,023	1.8
Total votes		58,777	100.0

==== Runoff results ====
Republican primary runoff results
Party	Candidate	Votes	%
Republican	Lance Gooden	18,364	54.0
Republican	Bunni Pounds	15,634	46.0
Total votes		33,998	100.0

=== Democratic primary ===
==== Candidates ====
===== Nominee =====
- Dan Wood, attorney

==== Endorsements ====
Dan Wood

Labor unions

- AFL-CIO

==== Results ====
Democratic primary results
Party	Candidate	Votes	%
Democratic	Dan Wood	16,923	100.0
Total votes		16,923	100.0

=== Libertarian primary ===
==== Candidates ====
===== Nominee =====
- Ben Leder

=== General election ===
==== Predictions ====
Source	Ranking	As of
The Cook Political Report	Safe R	November 5, 2018
Inside Elections	Safe R	November 5, 2018
Sabato's Crystal Ball	Safe R	November 5, 2018
RCP	Safe R	November 5, 2018
Daily Kos	Safe R	November 5, 2018
538	Safe R	November 7, 2018
CNN	Safe R	October 31, 2018
Politico	Safe R	November 4, 2018

==== Endorsements ====
Lance Gooden (R)

Newspapers

- Dallas Morning News
Dan Wood (D)

Labor unions

- AFL-CIO
- International Brotherhood of Boilermakers

==== Results ====
Texas's 5th congressional district, 2018
Party	Candidate	Votes	%
Republican	Lance Gooden	130,617	62.3
Democratic	Dan Wood	78,666	37.6
Independent	Phil Gray (write-in)	224	0.1
Total votes		209,507	100
Republican hold			

== District 6 ==
2018 Texas's 6th congressional district election
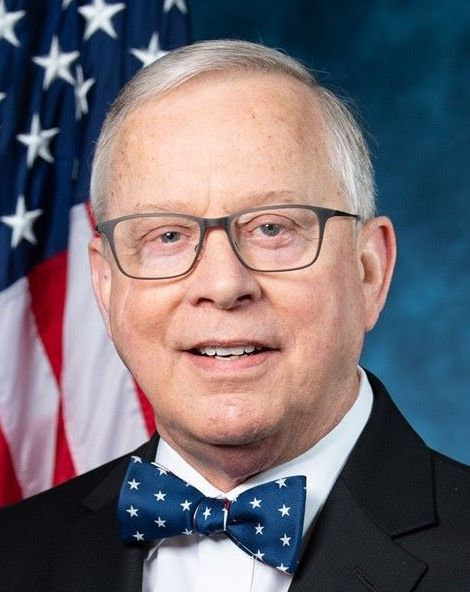

Nominee	Ron Wright	Jana Lynne Sanchez
Party	Republican	Democratic
Popular vote	135,961	116,350
Percentage	53.1%	45.4%
- County results Wright: 60–70% 70–80% Sanchez: 50–60%
U.S. Representative before election
Joe Barton
Republican
Elected U.S. Representative
Ron Wright
Republican

The 6th district is located in the Dallas–Fort Worth metroplex, including parts of Arlington, as well as Dalworthington Gardens and Mansfield. The district also stretches southward, taking in Corsicana and Ennis. Incumbent Republican Joe Barton, who had represented the district since 1985, announced in November 2017 that he would not run for re-election. He was re-elected with 58.3% of the vote in 2016. The district had a PVI of R+9.

=== Republican primary ===
==== Candidates ====
===== Nominee =====
- Ron Wright, former Tarrant County tax assessor

===== Eliminated in primary =====
- Ken Cope
- Shawn Dandridge
- Thomas Dillingham
- Shannon Dubberly, former counterterrorism professional for the U.S. Army and Air Force
- Jake Ellzey, retired Naval combat pilot and member of the Texas Veterans Commission
- Deborah Gagliardi
- Kevin Harrison
- Mel Hassell
- Mark Mitchell
- Troy Ratterree

===== Declined =====
- Joe Barton, incumbent U.S. representative

==== Endorsements ====
Jake Ellzey

Newspapers

- Dallas Morning News

==== Results ====
Republican primary results
Party	Candidate	Votes	%
Republican	Ron Wright	20,659	45.1
Republican	Jake Ellzey	9,956	21.7
Republican	Ken Cope	3,527	7.7
Republican	Shannon Dubberly	2,880	6.3
Republican	Mark Mitchell	2,141	4.7
Republican	Troy Ratterree	1,854	4.0
Republican	Kevin Harrison	1,768	3.9
Republican	Deborah Gagliardi	1,674	3.7
Republican	Thomas Dillingham	543	1.2
Republican	Shawn Dandridge	517	1.1
Republican	Mel Hassell	266	0.6
Total votes		45,785	100

==== Runoff results ====
Republican primary runoff results
Party	Candidate	Votes	%
Republican	Ron Wright	12,747	52.2
Republican	Jake Ellzey	11,686	47.8
Total votes		24,433	100

=== Democratic primary ===
==== Candidates ====
===== Nominee =====
- Jana Lynne Sanchez, public relations specialist and food journalist

===== Eliminated in primary =====
- John Duncan, lawyer and healthcare professional
- Levii R. Shocklee
- Justin Snider, small businessman
- Ruby Fay Woolridge, activist, former educator and nominee for this seat in 2016

==== Endorsements ====
Jana Lynne Sanchez

Labor unions

- AFL-CIO

Organizations

- Climate Hawks Vote
- End Citizens United
- New Democrat Coalition "Watch List"

==== Results ====
Democratic primary results
Party	Candidate	Votes	%
Democratic	Ruby Faye Woolridge	10,857	36.9
Democratic	Jana Lynne Sanchez	10,838	36.9
Democratic	John W. Duncan	3,978	13.5
Democratic	Justin Snider	2,014	6.9
Democratic	Levii R. Shocklee	1,702	5.8
Total votes		29,389	100

==== Runoff results ====
Democratic primary runoff results
Party	Candidate	Votes	%
Democratic	Jana Lynne Sanchez	6,103	53.1
Democratic	Ruby Faye Woolridge	5,386	46.9
Total votes		11,489	100.0

=== Libertarian primary ===
==== Candidates ====
===== Nominee =====
- Jason Allen Harber

=== General election ===
==== Endorsements ====
Ron Wright (R)

Organizations

- House Freedom Caucus
Jana Lynne Sanchez (D)

Labor unions

- AFL-CIO
- International Brotherhood of Boilermakers

Organizations

- Climate Hawks Vote
- Democratic Congressional Campaign Committee "Red to Blue" Program
- MoveOn
- New Democrat Coalition "Watch List"

Newspapers

- Dallas Morning News

==== Polling ====
Poll source	Date(s) administered	Sample size	Margin of error	Ron Wright (R)	Jana Lynne Sanchez (D)	Undecided
Public Policy Polling (D-Sanchez)	July 27–28, 2018	576	–	48%	39%	13%

==== Predictions ====
Source	Ranking	As of
The Cook Political Report	Likely R	November 5, 2018
Inside Elections	Safe R	November 5, 2018
Sabato's Crystal Ball	Likely R	November 5, 2018
RCP	Safe R	November 5, 2018
Daily Kos	Likely R	November 5, 2018
538	Likely R	November 7, 2018
CNN	Safe R	October 31, 2018
Politico	Likely R	November 4, 2018

==== Results ====
Texas's 6th congressional district, 2018
Party	Candidate	Votes	%
Republican	Ron Wright	135,961	53.1
Democratic	Jana Lynne Sanchez	116,350	45.4
Libertarian	Jason Harber	3,731	1.5
Total votes		256,042	100
Republican hold			

== District 7 ==
2018 Texas's 7th congressional district election
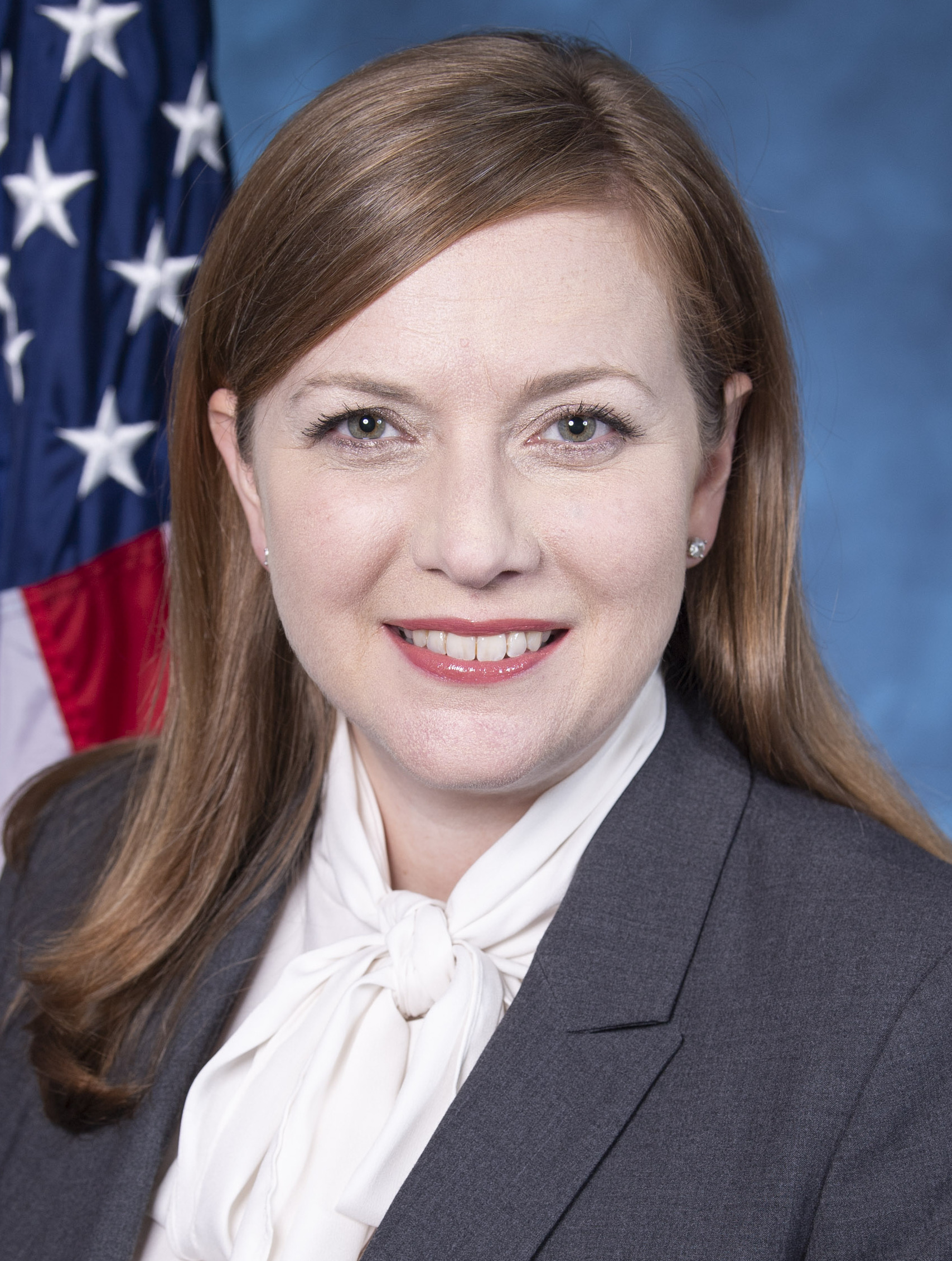

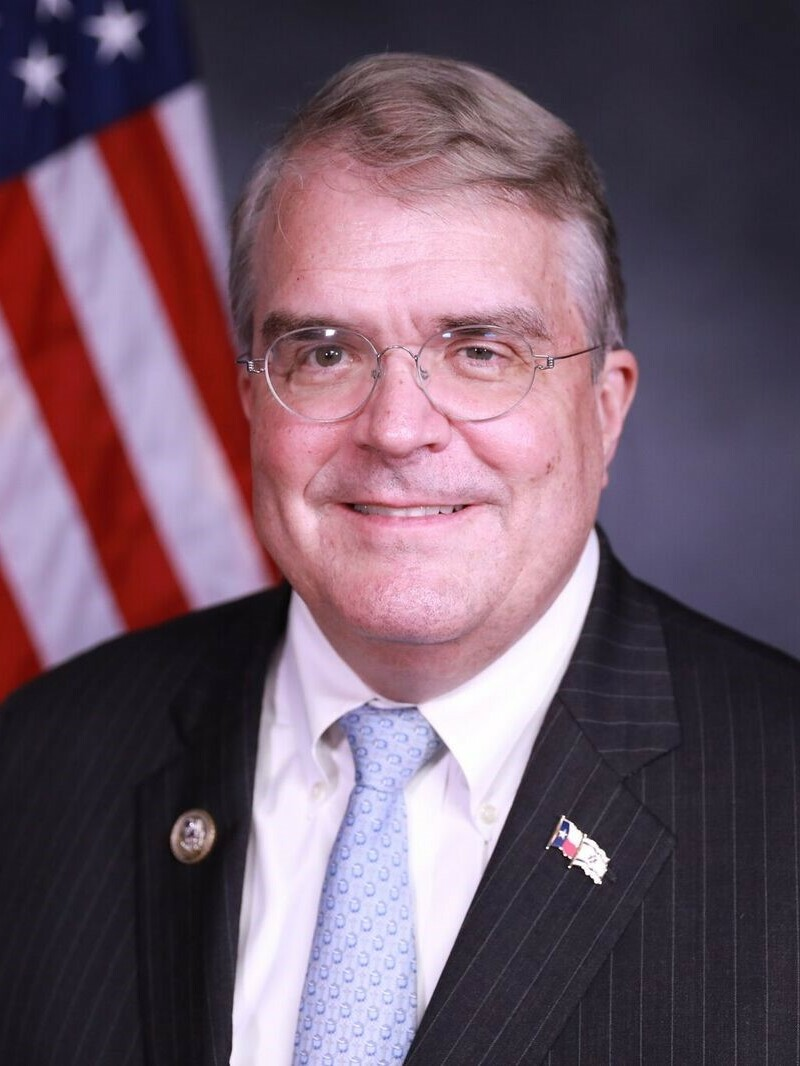
Nominee	Lizzie Fletcher	John Culberson
Party	Democratic	Republican
Popular vote	127,959	115,642
Percentage	52.5%	47.5%
- County result Fletcher: 50–60%
U.S. Representative before election
John Culberson
Republican
Elected U.S. Representative
Lizzie Fletcher
Democratic

The 7th district includes parts of western Houston and Bellaire. Incumbent Republican John Culberson, who had represented the district since 2001, ran for re-election. He was re-elected with 56.2% of the vote in 2016. The district had a PVI of R+7.

=== Republican primary ===
==== Candidates ====
===== Nominee =====
- John Culberson, incumbent U.S. representative

===== Eliminated in primary =====
- Edward Ziegler, business owner and consultant, businessman

==== Endorsements ====
John Culberson

Newspapers

- Houston Chronicle

==== Results ====
Republican primary results
Party	Candidate	Votes	%
Republican	John Culberson (incumbent)	28,944	76.1
Republican	Edward Ziegler	9,088	23.9
Total votes		38,032	100

=== Democratic primary ===
==== Campaign ====
In February 2018, the Democratic Congressional Campaign Committee, citing concerns about Laura Moser's electability in the general election, called attention to some of her past statements that they deemed controversial. That action was condemned by DNC chair Tom Perez and Our Revolution, which endorsed Moser a few days later.

==== Candidates ====
===== Nominee =====
- Lizzie Fletcher, attorney and activist

===== Eliminated in primary =====
- Joshua Butler, business analyst, community relations representative, and pharmaceutical sales representative
- James Cargas, energy attorney and nominee for this seat in 2012, 2014 & 2016
- Laura Moser, editor and journalist
- Ivan Sanchez, senior congressional liaison
- Alex Triantaphyllis, attorney and organizer
- Jason Westin, physician

==== Endorsements ====
Lizzie Fletcher

Newspapers

- Houston Chronicle (joint with Westin)
Laura Moser

Organizations

- Justice Democrats
- Our Revolution
Jason Westin

Newspapers

- Houston Chronicle (joint with Fletcher)

AFL-CIO did not endorse a specific candidate, but did state its opposition to Lizzie Fletcher.

==== Results ====
Democratic primary results
Party	Candidate	Votes	%
Democratic	Lizzie Fletcher	9,731	29.3
Democratic	Laura Moser	8,077	24.4
Democratic	Jason Westin	6,364	19.2
Democratic	Alex Triantaphyllis	5,219	15.7
Democratic	Ivan Sanchez	1,890	5.7
Democratic	Joshua Butler	1,245	3.7
Democratic	James Cargas	650	2.0
Total votes		33,176	100.0

==== Runoff results ====
Democratic primary runoff results
Party	Candidate	Votes	%
Democratic	Lizzie Fletcher	11,423	67.1
Democratic	Laura Moser	5,605	32.9
Total votes		17,028	100.0

=== General election ===
==== Endorsements ====
John Culberson (R)

Organizations

- BIPAC
- National Republican Congressional Committee "Patriot" Program
Lizzie Fletcher (D)

Organizations

- Democratic Congressional Campaign Committee "Red to Blue" Program
- EMILY's List
- End Citizens United
- MoveOn
- New Democrat Coalition

Newspapers

- Houston Chronicle

==== Polling ====
Poll source	Date(s) administered	Sample size	Margin of error	John Culberson (R)	Lizzie Pannill Fletcher (D)	Undecided
NYT Upshot/Siena College	October 19–25, 2018	499	± 4.6%	46%	45%	9%
Public Policy Polling (D)	September 17–18, 2018	562	± 4.1%	45%	47%	–
NYT Upshot/Siena College	September 14–18, 2018	500	± 4.5%	48%	45%	7%
DCCC (D)	May 23–31, 2018	404	± 4.9%	47%	45%	–

Hypothetical polling

Poll source	Date(s) administered	Sample size	Margin of error	John Culberson (R)	Democratic opponent (D)	Other	Undecided
Public Policy Polling (D)	November 8–10, 2017	518	± 4.0%	39%	49%	–	12%

==== Predictions ====
Source	Ranking	As of
The Cook Political Report	Tossup	November 5, 2018
Inside Elections	Tilt R	November 5, 2018
Sabato's Crystal Ball	Lean R	November 5, 2018
RCP	Tossup	November 5, 2018
Daily Kos	Tossup	November 5, 2018
538	Tossup	November 7, 2018
CNN	Tossup	October 31, 2018
Politico	Tossup	November 4, 2018

==== Results ====
Texas's 7th congressional district, 2018
Party	Candidate	Votes	%
Democratic	Lizzie Fletcher	127,959	52.5
Republican	John Culberson (incumbent)	115,642	47.5
Total votes		243,601	100
Democratic gain from Republican			

== District 8 ==
2018 Texas's 8th congressional district election
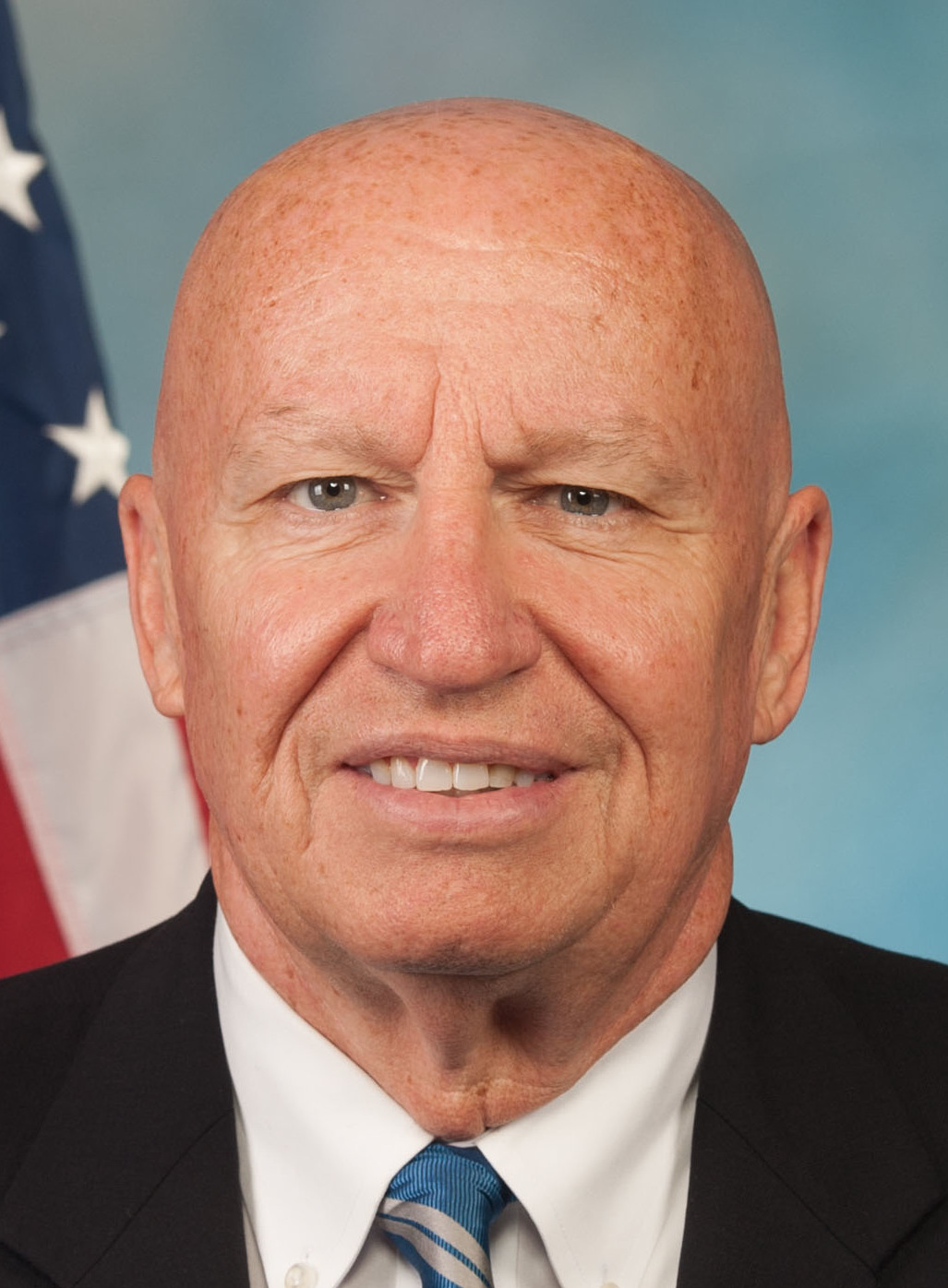

Nominee	Kevin Brady	Steven David
Party	Republican	Democratic
Popular vote	200,619	67,930
Percentage	73.4%	24.9%
- County results Brady: 60–70% 70–80% 80–90%
U.S. Representative before election
Kevin Brady
Republican
Elected U.S. Representative
Kevin Brady
Republican

The 8th district includes much of the northern suburbs of Houston, such as Conroe, Huntsville, and The Woodlands. Incumbent Republican Kevin Brady, who had represented the district since 1997, ran for re-election. He was re-elected unopposed in 2016. The district had a PVI of R+28.

=== Republican primary ===
==== Candidates ====
===== Nominee =====
- Kevin Brady, incumbent U.S. representative

==== Results ====
Republican primary results
Party	Candidate	Votes	%
Republican	Kevin Brady (incumbent)	67,593	100.0
Total votes		67,593	100.0

=== Democratic primary ===
==== Candidates ====
===== Nominee =====
- Steven David, business consultant to the City of Houston

==== Results ====
Democratic primary results
Party	Candidate	Votes	%
Democratic	Steven David	13,183	100.0
Total votes		13,183	100.0

=== Libertarian primary ===
==== Candidates ====
===== Nominee =====
- Chris Duncan

===== Eliminated in primary =====
- Bert Aguin

=== Independent candidates ===
- Todd Carlton, crop consultant

=== General election ===
==== Predictions ====
Source	Ranking	As of
The Cook Political Report	Safe R	November 5, 2018
Inside Elections	Safe R	November 5, 2018
Sabato's Crystal Ball	Safe R	November 5, 2018
RCP	Safe R	November 5, 2018
Daily Kos	Safe R	November 5, 2018
538	Safe R	November 7, 2018
CNN	Safe R	October 31, 2018
Politico	Safe R	November 4, 2018

==== Endorsements ====
Kevin Brady (R)

U.S. executive branch officials

- Donald Trump, president of the United States
Steven David (D)

Labor unions

- AFL-CIO
- International Brotherhood of Boilermakers

Newspapers

- Houston Chronicle

==== Results ====
Texas's 8th congressional district, 2018
Party	Candidate	Votes	%
Republican	Kevin Brady (incumbent)	200,619	73.4
Democratic	Steven David	67,930	24.9
Libertarian	Chris Duncan	4,621	1.7
Total votes		273,170	100
Republican hold			

== District 9 ==
2018 Texas's 9th congressional district election
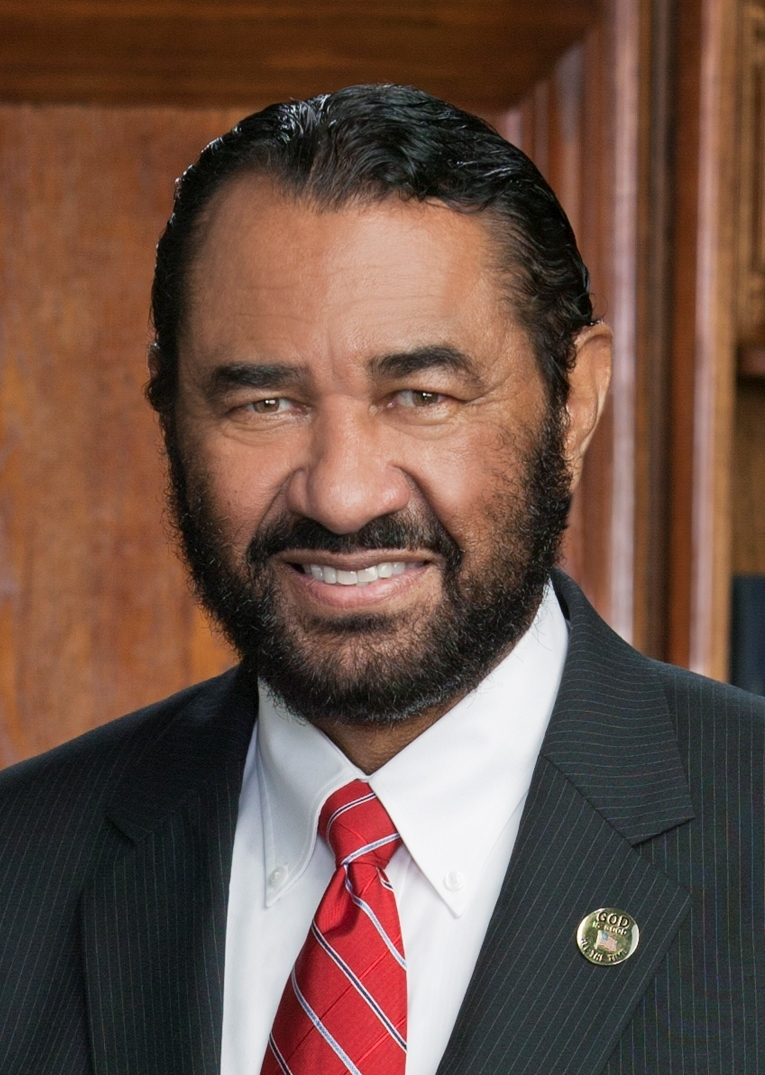
Nominee	Al Green
Party	Democratic
Popular vote	136,256
Percentage	89.1%
- County results Green: 80–90%
U.S. Representative before election
Al Green
Democratic
Elected U.S. Representative
Al Green
Democratic

The 9th district serves the southwestern portion of the Greater Houston area including parts of Missouri City and Sugar Land. Incumbent Democrat Al Green, who had represented the district since 2005, ran for re-election. He was re-elected with 80.6% of the vote in 2016. The district had a PVI of D+28.

=== Democratic primary ===
==== Candidates ====
===== Nominee =====
- Al Green, incumbent U.S. representative

==== Endorsements ====
Al Green

Labor unions

- AFL-CIO

==== Results ====
Democratic primary results
Party	Candidate	Votes	%
Democratic	Al Green (incumbent)	32,881	100.0
Total votes		32,881	100.0

=== Republican primary ===
No Republicans filed.

=== Libertarian primary ===
==== Candidates ====
===== Nominee =====
- Phil Kurtz

=== Independent candidates ===
- Benjamin Hernandez
- Kesha Rogers, LaRouche movement activist, Democratic nominee for the 22nd district in 2010 & 2012 and candidate for U.S. Senate in 2014

=== General election ===
==== Predictions ====
Source	Ranking	As of
The Cook Political Report	Safe D	November 5, 2018
Inside Elections	Safe D	November 5, 2018
Sabato's Crystal Ball	Safe D	November 5, 2018
RCP	Safe D	November 5, 2018
Daily Kos	Safe D	November 5, 2018
538	Safe D	November 7, 2018
CNN	Safe D	October 31, 2018
Politico	Safe D	November 4, 2018

==== Endorsements ====
Al Green (D)

Labor unions

- AFL-CIO
- Communications Workers of America
- International Brotherhood of Boilermakers
Phil Kurtz (L)

Organizations

- Americans for Legal Immigration
- Certified Constitutional Candidates
- Constitutional Grassroots Movement
- iVoteAmerica
- The Paleolibertarian Caucus

==== Results ====
Texas's 9th congressional district, 2018
Party	Candidate	Votes	%
Democratic	Al Green (incumbent)	136,256	89.1
Libertarian	Phil Kurtz	5,940	3.9
Independent	Benjamin Hernandez	5,774	3.8
Independent	Kesha Rogers	5,031	3.3
Total votes		153,001	100.0
Democratic hold			

== District 10 ==
2018 Texas's 10th congressional district election
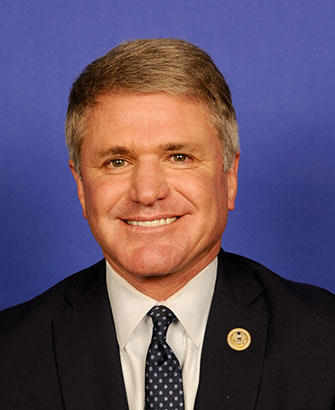

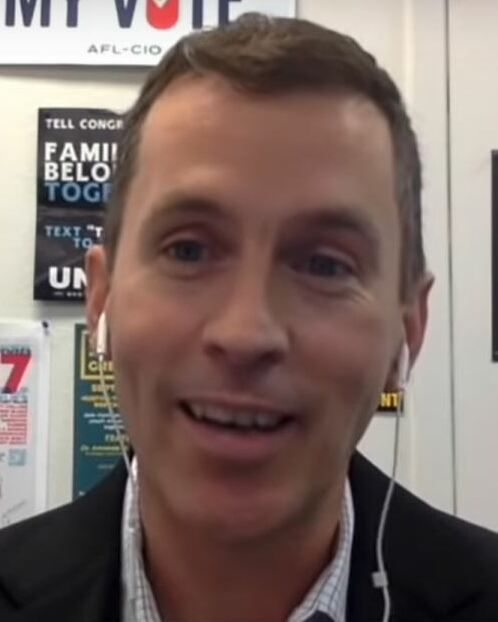
Nominee	Michael McCaul	Mike Siegel
Party	Republican	Democratic
Popular vote	157,166	144,034
Percentage	51.1%	46.8%
- County results McCaul: 50–60% 60–70% 70–80% Siegel: 70–80%
U.S. Representative before election
Michael McCaul
Republican
Elected U.S. Representative
Michael McCaul
Republican

The 10th district includes portions of northern Austin and its suburbs, such as Manor and Pflugerville. The district stretches eastward into rural areas of Central Texas and the outer suburbs of Houston, including Cypress, Katy, and Tomball. Incumbent Republican Michael McCaul, who had represented the district since 2005, ran for re-election. He was re-elected with 57.3% of the vote in 2016. The district had a PVI of R+9.

=== Republican primary ===
==== Candidates ====
===== Nominee =====
- Michael McCaul, incumbent U.S. representative

===== Eliminated in primary =====
- John W. Cook, attorney

==== Results ====
Republican primary results
Party	Candidate	Votes	%
Republican	Michael McCaul (incumbent)	41,881	80.1
Republican	John W. Cook	10,413	19.9
Total votes		52,294	100

=== Democratic primary ===
In the Democratic primary, Mike Siegel and Tawana Cadien advanced to the runoff, where Siegel ultimately prevailed. Siegel refused all corporate PAC donations.

==== Candidates ====
===== Nominee =====
- Mike Siegel, Austin assistant attorney general and attorney

===== Eliminated in primary =====
- Tawana Cadien, consultant, registered nurse, MMA Surgery supervisor, quality assurance director and nominee for this seat in 2012, 2014 & 2016
- Richie DeGrow, business manager and consultant
- Madeline Eden, businesswoman, engineer, and architect
- Matt Harris, data scientist and project manager
- Kevin Nelson, college instructor and publisher
- Tami Walker, accountant and activist

==== Endorsements ====
Mike Siegel

Labor unions

- AFL-CIO

Newspapers

- The Austin Chronicle
- Houston Chronicle (joint with Walker)
Tami Walker

Newspapers

- Houston Chronicle (joint with Siegel)

==== Results ====
Democratic primary results
Party	Candidate	Votes	%
Democratic	Mike Siegel	15,434	40.0
Democratic	Tawana Walter-Cadien	6,938	18.0
Democratic	Tami Walker	6,015	15.6
Democratic	Madeline K. Eden	5,514	14.3
Democratic	Matt Harris	2,825	7.3
Democratic	Kevin Nelson	1,589	4.1
Democratic	Richie DeGrow	301	0.8
Total votes		38,616	100.0

==== Runoff results ====
Democratic primary runoff results
Party	Candidate	Votes	%
Democratic	Mike Siegel	12,274	69.9
Democratic	Tawana Walter-Cadien	5,285	30.1
Total votes		17,559	100.0

=== Libertarian primary ===
==== Candidates ====
===== Nominee =====
- Mike Ryan

===== Eliminated in primary =====
- Bill Kelsey

=== General election ===
==== Endorsements ====
Mike Siegel (D)

Labor unions

- AFL-CIO
- Communications Workers of America
- International Brotherhood of Boilermakers

Organizations

- MoveOn
- Our Revolution

Newspapers

- The Austin Chronicle
- Houston Chronicle

==== Polling ====
Poll source	Date(s) administered	Sample size	Margin of error	Michael McCaul (R)	Mike Siegel (D)	Undecided
Blink Insights (D-Siegel)	July 31 – August 4, 2018	524	± 4.3%	39%	36%	25%

==== Predictions ====
Source	Ranking	As of
The Cook Political Report	Likely R	November 5, 2018
Inside Elections	Safe R	November 5, 2018
Sabato's Crystal Ball	Safe R	November 5, 2018
RCP	Safe R	November 5, 2018
Daily Kos	Safe R	November 5, 2018
538	Likely R	November 7, 2018
CNN	Safe R	October 31, 2018
Politico	Safe R	November 4, 2018

==== Results ====
In the general election, McCaul won against Siegel by 4.3 percent of the vote, the closest contest McCaul had faced. The outcome was notable in a district rated by political experts as "Heavily Republican."

Texas's 10th congressional district, 2018
Party	Candidate	Votes	%
Republican	Michael McCaul (incumbent)	157,166	51.1
Democratic	Mike Siegel	144,034	46.8
Libertarian	Mike Ryan	6,627	2.1
Total votes		307,827	100.0
Republican hold			

== District 11 ==
2018 Texas's 11th congressional district election
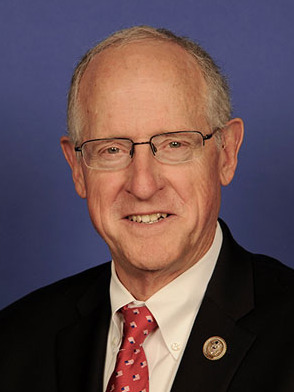

Nominee	Mike Conaway	Jennie Lou Leeder
Party	Republican	Democratic
Popular vote	176,603	40,631
Percentage	80.1%	18.5%
- County results Conaway: 70–80% 80–90% >90%
U.S. Representative before election
Mike Conaway
Republican
Elected U.S. Representative
Mike Conaway
Republican

The 11th district is located in the Concho Valley including Midland, Odessa, and San Angelo. Incumbent Republican Mike Conaway, who had represented the district since 2005, ran for re-election. He was re-elected with 89.5% of the vote in 2016. The district had a PVI of R+32, making this one of the most Republican districts in the country.

=== Republican primary ===
==== Candidates ====
===== Nominee =====
- Mike Conaway, incumbent U.S. representative

===== Eliminated in primary =====
- Paul Myers

==== Results ====
Republican primary results
Party	Candidate	Votes	%
Republican	Mike Conaway (incumbent)	63,410	82.9
Republican	Paul Myers	13,047	17.1
Total votes		76,457	100

=== Democratic primary ===
==== Candidates ====
===== Nominee =====
- Jennie Lou Leeder, chair of the Llano County Democratic Party

===== Eliminated in primary =====
- Eric Pfalzgraf

==== Results ====
Democratic primary results
Party	Candidate	Votes	%
Democratic	Jennie Lou Leeder	7,264	82.7
Democratic	Eric Pfalzgraf	1,520	17.3
Total votes		8,784	100.0

=== Libertarian primary ===
==== Candidates ====
===== Nominee =====
- Rhett Rosenquest Smith

===== Eliminated in primary =====
- Nicholas Landholt

=== General election ===
Source	Ranking	As of
The Cook Political Report	Safe R	November 5, 2018
Inside Elections	Safe R	November 5, 2018
Sabato's Crystal Ball	Safe R	November 5, 2018
RCP	Safe R	November 5, 2018
Daily Kos	Safe R	November 5, 2018
538	Safe R	November 7, 2018
CNN	Safe R	October 31, 2018
Politico	Safe R	November 4, 2018

==== Results ====
Texas's 11th congressional district, 2018
Party	Candidate	Votes	%
Republican	Mike Conaway (incumbent)	176,603	80.1
Democratic	Jennie Lou Leeder	40,631	18.5
Libertarian	Rhett Rosenquest Smith	3,143	1.4
Total votes		220,377	100.0
Republican hold			

== District 12 ==
2018 Texas's 12th congressional district election
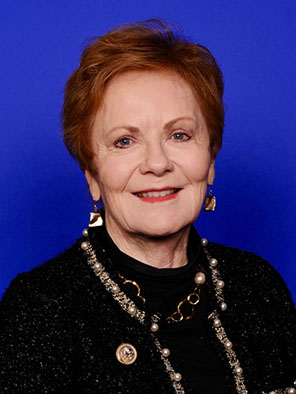

Nominee	Kay Granger	Vanessa Adia
Party	Republican	Democratic
Popular vote	172,557	90,994
Percentage	64.3%	33.9%
- County results Granger: 50–60% 70–80%
U.S. Representative before election
Kay Granger
Republican
Elected U.S. Representative
Kay Granger
Republican

The 12th district is centered around Fort Worth and the surrounding suburbs including North Richland Hills, Weatherford, and White Settlement. Incumbent Republican Kay Granger, who had represented the district since 1997, ran for re-election. She was re-elected with 69.4% of the vote in 2016. The district had a PVI of R+18.

=== Republican primary ===
==== Candidates ====
===== Nominee =====
- Kay Granger, incumbent U.S. representative

==== Results ====
Republican primary results
Party	Candidate	Votes	%
Republican	Kay Granger (incumbent)	49,385	100.0
Total votes		49,385	100.0

=== Democratic primary ===
==== Candidates ====
===== Nominee =====
- Vanessa Adia, schoolteacher, activist

===== Withdrawn =====
- Al Woolum

==== Endorsements ====
Vanessa Adia

Organizations

- Brand New Congress

==== Results ====
Democratic primary results
Party	Candidate	Votes	%
Democratic	Vanessa Adia	21,018	100.0
Total votes		21,018	100.0

=== Libertarian primary ===
==== Candidates ====
===== Nominee =====
- Jacob Leddy

=== General election ===
Source	Ranking	As of
The Cook Political Report	Safe R	November 5, 2018
Inside Elections	Safe R	November 5, 2018
Sabato's Crystal Ball	Safe R	November 5, 2018
RCP	Safe R	November 5, 2018
Daily Kos	Safe R	November 5, 2018
538	Safe R	November 7, 2018
CNN	Safe R	October 31, 2018
Politico	Safe R	November 4, 2018

==== Endorsements ====
Kay Granger (R)

Newspapers

- Dallas Morning News
Vanessa Adia (D)

Labor unions

- AFL-CIO
- International Brotherhood of Boilermakers

Organizations

- Brand New Congress
- Justice Democrats

==== Polling ====
Poll source	Date(s) administered	Sample size	Margin of error	Kay Granger (R)	Vanessa Adia (D)	Undecided
Public Policy Polling (D)	September 27–28, 2018	590	–	62%	30%	7%

==== Results ====
Texas's 12th congressional district, 2018
Party	Candidate	Votes	%
Republican	Kay Granger (incumbent)	172,557	64.3
Democratic	Vanessa Adia	90,994	33.9
Libertarian	Jacob Leddy	4,940	1.8
Total votes		268,491	100
Republican hold			

== District 13 ==
2018 Texas's 13th congressional district election
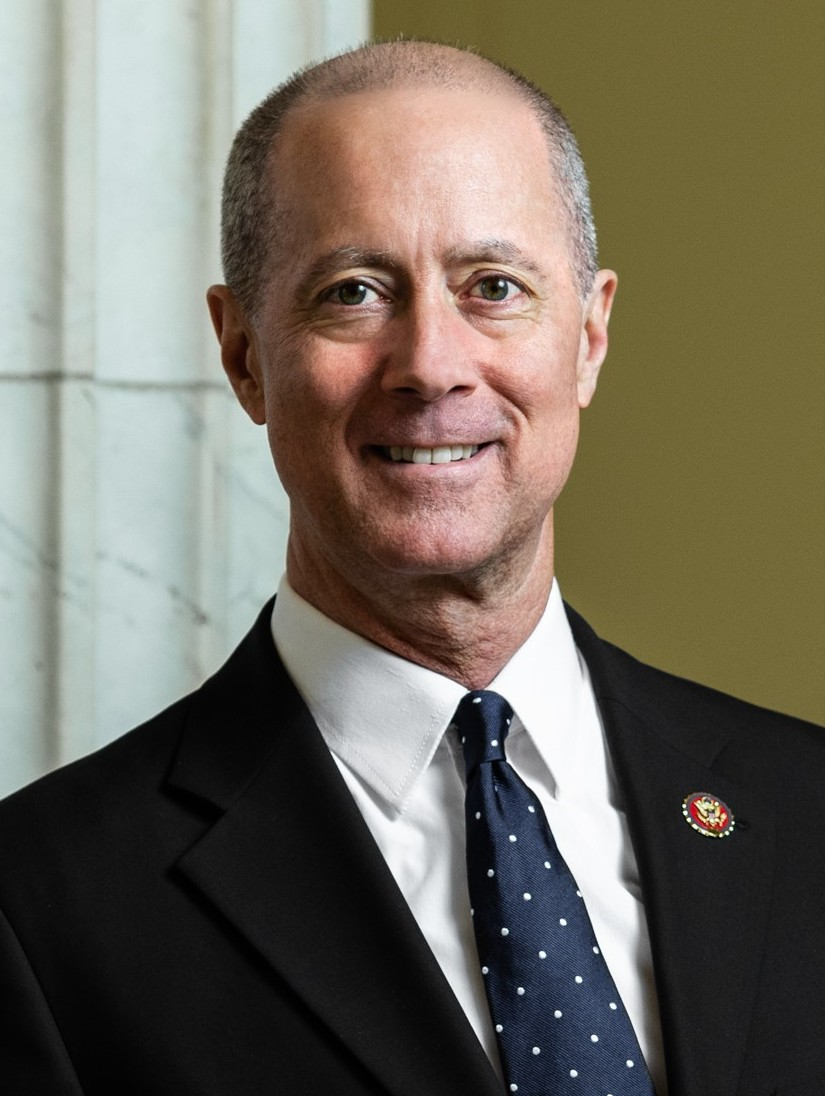

Nominee	Mac Thornberry	Greg Sagan
Party	Republican	Democratic
Popular vote	169,027	35,083
Percentage	81.6%	16.9%
- County results Thornberry: 70–80% 80–90% >90%
U.S. Representative before election
Mac Thornberry
Republican
Elected U.S. Representative
Mac Thornberry
Republican

The 13th district includes most of the Texas Panhandle, parts of Texoma and northeastern parts of North Texas. It winds across the Panhandle into the South Plains, then runs east across the Red River Valley. Covering over 40,000 square miles (100,000 km^{2}), it is the second-largest district geographically in Texas and larger in area than thirteen entire states. The principal cities in the district are Amarillo and Wichita Falls. Incumbent Republican Mac Thornberry, who had represented the district since 1995, ran for re-election. He was re-elected with 90.0% of the vote in 2016. The district had a PVI of R+33, making it the most Republican district in the country.

=== Republican primary ===
==== Candidates ====
===== Nominee =====
- Mac Thornberry, incumbent U.S. representative

==== Results ====
Republican primary results
Party	Candidate	Votes	%
Republican	Mac Thornberry (incumbent)	71,018	100.0
Total votes		71,018	100.0

=== Democratic primary ===
==== Candidates ====
===== Nominee =====
- Greg Sagan, Navy veteran

==== Endorsements ====
Greg Sagan

Labor unions

- AFL-CIO

==== Results ====
Democratic primary results
Party	Candidate	Votes	%
Democratic	Greg Sagan	7,322	100.0
Total votes		7,322	100.0

=== Libertarian primary ===
==== Candidates ====
===== Nominee =====
- Calvin DeWeese

=== General election ===
Source	Ranking	As of
The Cook Political Report	Safe R	November 5, 2018
Inside Elections	Safe R	November 5, 2018
Sabato's Crystal Ball	Safe R	November 5, 2018
RCP	Safe R	November 5, 2018
Daily Kos	Safe R	November 5, 2018
538	Safe R	November 7, 2018
CNN	Safe R	October 31, 2018
Politico	Safe R	November 4, 2018

==== Endorsements ====
Greg Sagan (D)

Labor unions

- AFL-CIO
- International Brotherhood of Boilermakers

==== Results ====
Texas's 13th congressional district, 2018
Party	Candidate	Votes	%
Republican	Mac Thornberry (incumbent)	169,027	81.6
Democratic	Greg Sagan	35,083	16.9
Libertarian	Calvin DeWeese	3,175	1.5
Total votes		207,285	100
Republican hold			

== District 14 ==
2018 Texas's 14th congressional district election
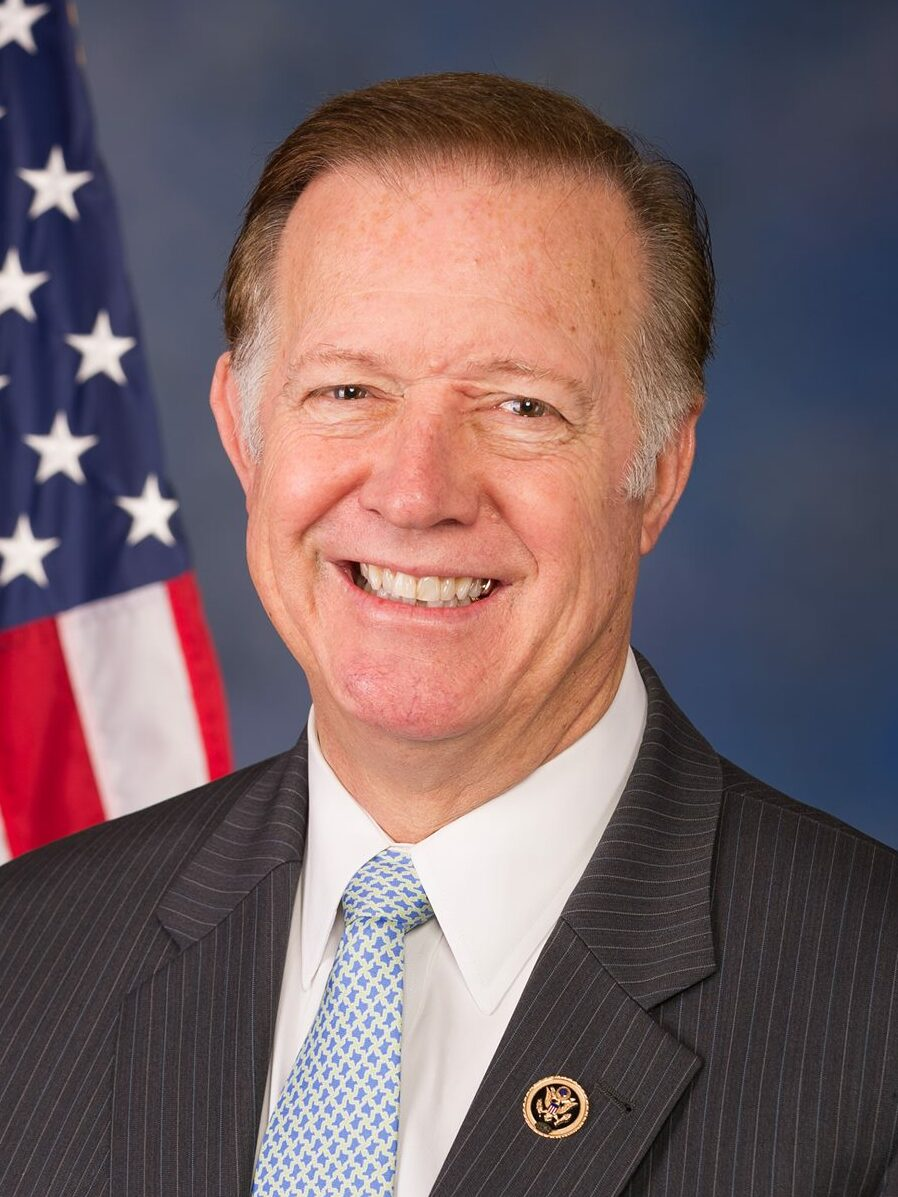

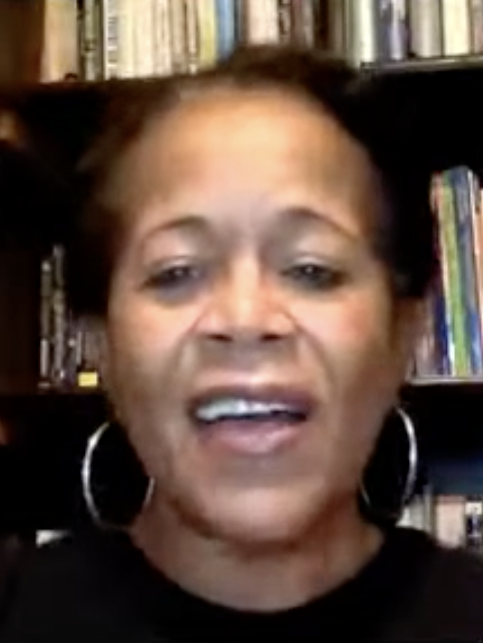
Nominee	Randy Weber	Adrienne Bell
Party	Republican	Democratic
Popular vote	138,942	92,212
Percentage	59.2%	39.3%
- County results Weber: 50–60% 60–70%
U.S. Representative before election
Randy Weber
Republican
Elected U.S. Representative
Randy Weber
Republican

The 14th district covers the Gulf Coast area of Texas, including Beaumont, Galveston, and League City. Republican Randy Weber was the incumbent, having served since 2013. He was reelected with 61.9% of the vote in 2016. The district's PVI was R+12.

=== Republican primary ===
==== Candidates ====
===== Nominee =====
- Randy Weber, incumbent U.S. representative

===== Eliminated in primary =====
- Keith Casey
- Bill "Sarge" Sargent

==== Results ====
Republican primary results
Party	Candidate	Votes	%
Republican	Randy Weber (incumbent)	33,509	75.2
Republican	Bill "Sarge" Sargent	8,742	19.6
Republican	Keith Casey	2,291	5.2
Total votes		44,542	100

=== Democratic primary ===
==== Candidates ====
===== Nominee =====
- Adrienne Bell, education administrator

===== Eliminated in primary =====
- Levy Q. Barnes Jr.

==== Endorsements ====
Adrienne Bell

Labor unions

- AFL-CIO

Organizations

- Justice Democrats

==== Results ====
Democratic primary results
Party	Candidate	Votes	%
Democratic	Adrienne Bell	19,458	79.8
Democratic	Levy Q. Barnes Jr.	4,923	20.2
Total votes		24,381	100

=== Libertarian primary ===
==== Candidates ====
===== Nominee =====
- Don E. Conley III

=== General election ===
Source	Ranking	As of
The Cook Political Report	Safe R	November 5, 2018
Inside Elections	Safe R	November 5, 2018
Sabato's Crystal Ball	Safe R	November 5, 2018
RCP	Safe R	November 5, 2018
Daily Kos	Safe R	November 5, 2018
538	Safe R	November 7, 2018
CNN	Safe R	October 31, 2018
Politico	Safe R	November 4, 2018

==== Endorsements ====
Randy Weber (R)

Organizations

- House Freedom Caucus

Newspapers

- Houston Chronicle
Adrienne Bell (D)

Former U.S. executive branch officials

- Barack Obama, 44th president of the United States

Labor unions

- AFL-CIO
- International Brotherhood of Boilermakers

Organizations

- Brand New Congress
- Justice Democrats
- MoveOn
- Our Revolution

==== Results ====
Texas's 14th congressional district, 2018
Party	Candidate	Votes	%
Republican	Randy Weber (incumbent)	138,942	59.2
Democratic	Adrienne Bell	92,212	39.3
Libertarian	Don Conley III	3,374	1.5
Total votes		234,528	100.0
Republican hold			

== District 15 ==
2018 Texas's 15th congressional district election
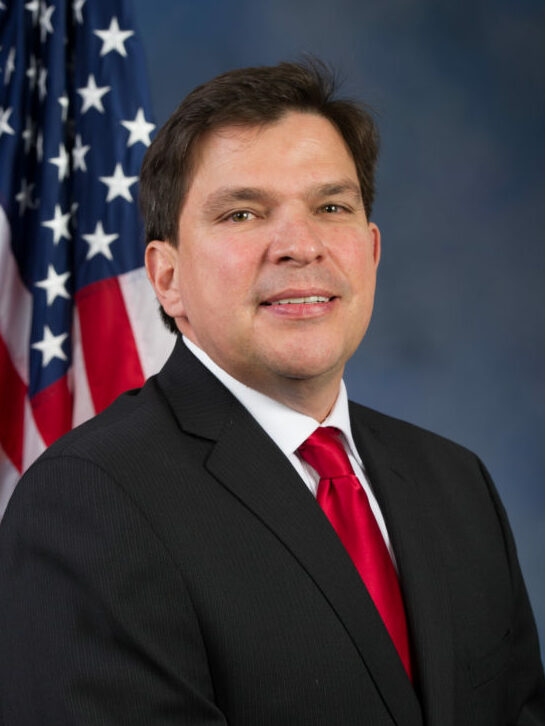

Nominee	Vicente González	Tim Westley
Party	Democratic	Republican
Popular vote	98,333	63,862
Percentage	59.7%	38.8%
- Gonzalez: 40–50% 50–60% 60–70% 70–80% 80–90% >90% Westley: 40–50% 50–60% 60–70% 70–80% 80–90% >90% No votes
U.S. Representative before election
Vicente González
Democratic
Elected U.S. Representative
Vicente González
Democratic

The 15th district stretches from parts of South Texas including Edinburg, Hebbronville, and McAllen, to the northeastern suburbs of San Antonio such as Schertz and Seguin. Incumbent Democrat Vicente González, who had represented the district since 2017, ran for re-election. He was re-elected with 57.3% of the vote in 2016. The district had a PVI of D+7.

=== Democratic primary ===
==== Candidates ====
===== Nominee =====
- Vicente González, incumbent U.S. representative

==== Endorsements ====
Vicente Gonzalez

Labor unions

- AFL-CIO

Organizations

- Blue Dog Coalition
- New Democrat Coalition

==== Results ====
Democratic primary results
Party	Candidate	Votes	%
Democratic	Vicente González (incumbent)	33,549	100.0
Total votes		33,549	100.0

=== Republican primary ===
==== Candidates ====
===== Nominee =====
- Tim Westley

==== Results ====
Republican primary results
Party	Candidate	Votes	%
Republican	Tim Westley	14,794	100.0
Total votes		14,794	100.0

=== Libertarian primary ===
==== Candidates ====
===== Nominee =====
- Anthony Cristo

===== Eliminated in primary =====
- Ross Lynn Leone

=== General election ===
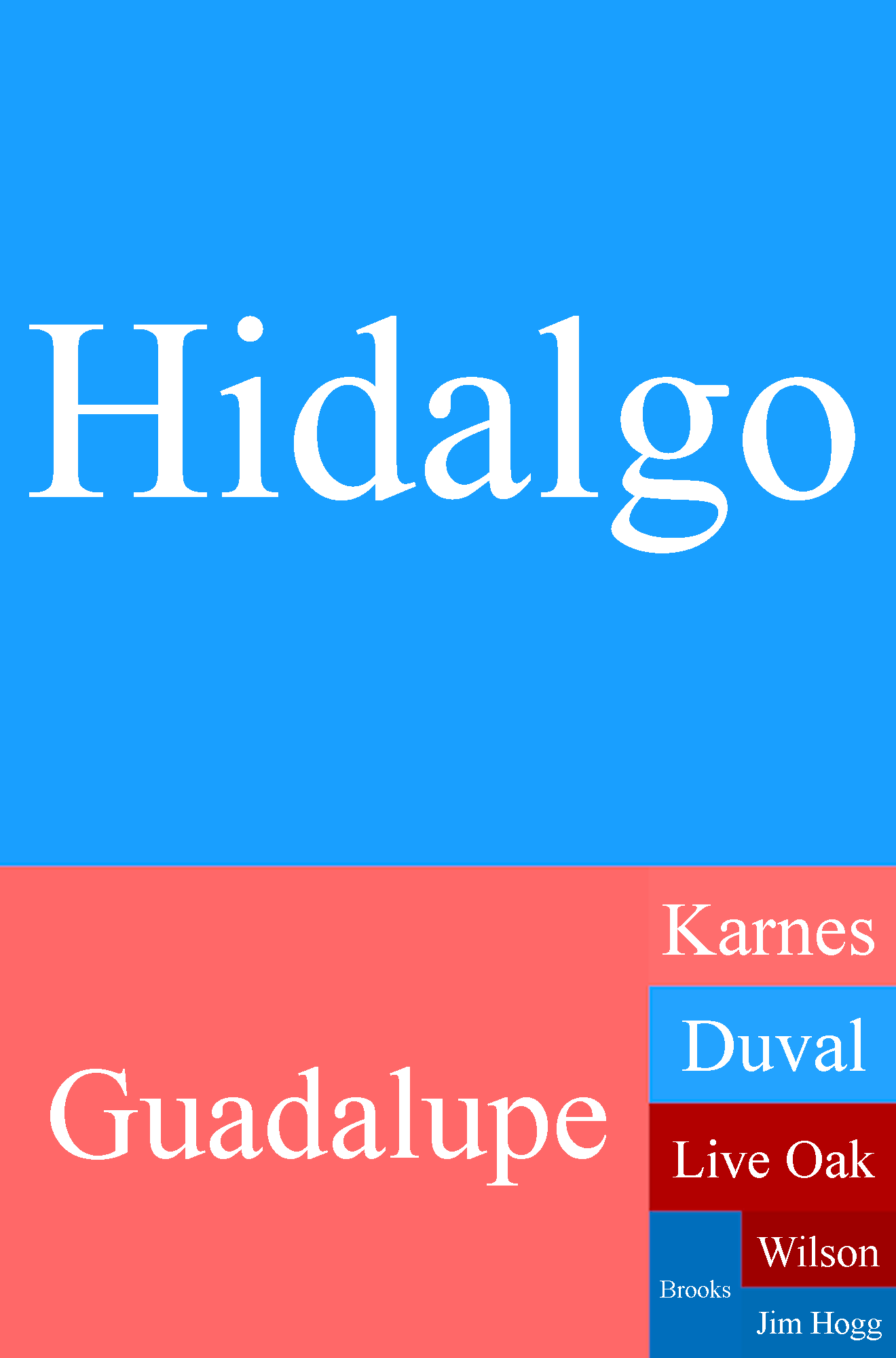
Cartogram of Texas' 15th congressional district

==== Predictions ====
Source	Ranking	As of
The Cook Political Report	Safe D	November 5, 2018
Inside Elections	Safe D	November 5, 2018
Sabato's Crystal Ball	Safe D	November 5, 2018
RCP	Safe D	November 5, 2018
Daily Kos	Safe D	November 5, 2018
538	Safe D	November 7, 2018
CNN	Safe D	October 31, 2018
Politico	Safe D	November 4, 2018

==== Endorsements ====
Vicente Gonzalez (D)

Labor unions

- AFL-CIO
- Communications Workers of America
- International Brotherhood of Boilermakers

Organizations

- Blue Dog Coalition
- End Citizens United
- New Democrat Coalition

==== Results ====
Texas's 15th congressional district, 2018
Party	Candidate	Votes	%
Democratic	Vicente González (incumbent)	98,333	59.7
Republican	Tim Westley	63,862	38.7
Libertarian	Anthony Cristo	2,607	1.6
Total votes		164,802	100.0
Democratic hold			

== District 16 ==
2018 Texas's 16th congressional district election
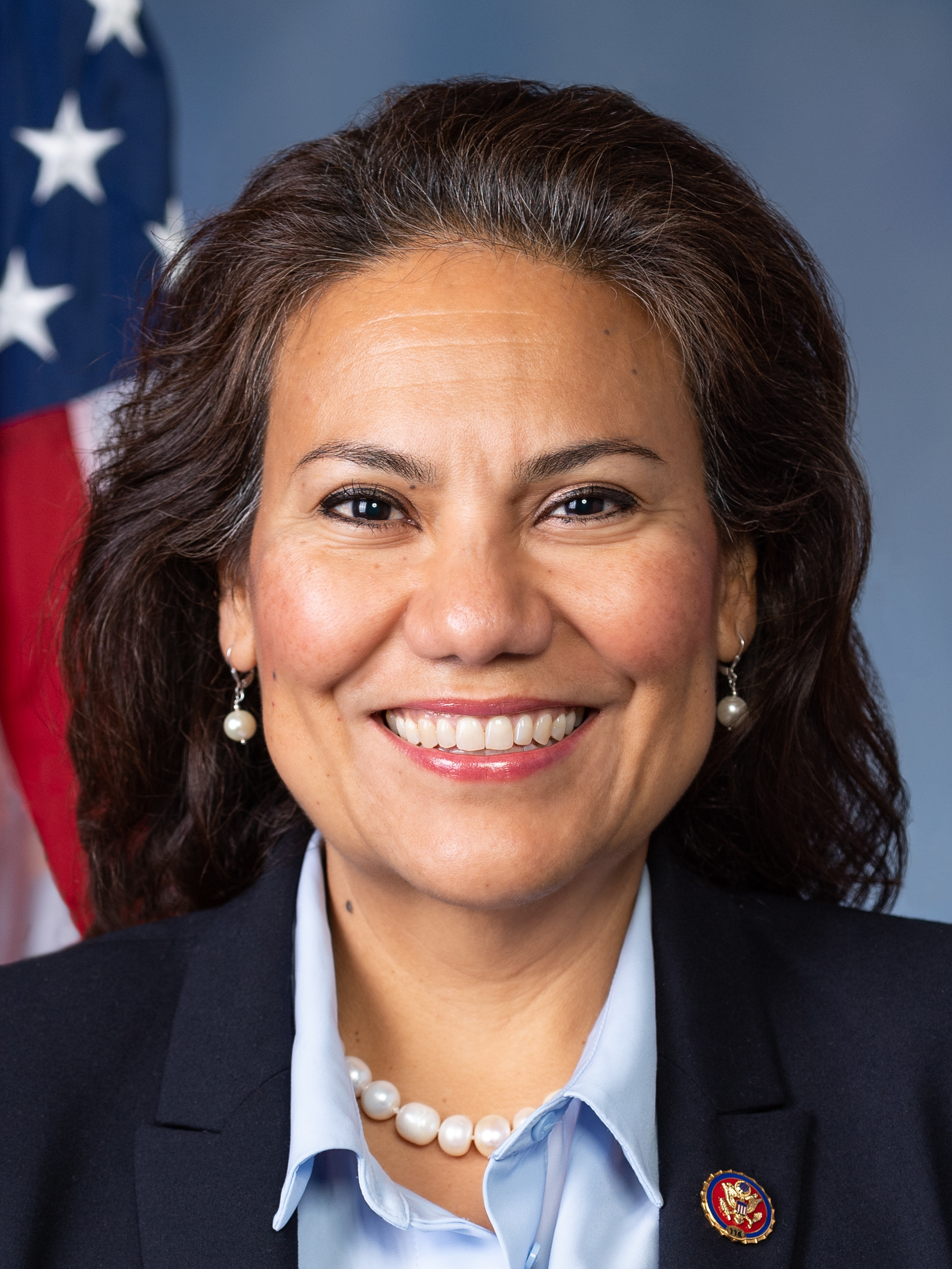

Nominee	Veronica Escobar	Rick Seeberger
Party	Democratic	Republican
Popular vote	124,437	49,127
Percentage	68.5%	27.0%
U.S. Representative before election
Beto O'Rourke
Democratic
Elected U.S. Representative
Veronica Escobar
Democratic

The 16th district is centered around El Paso and the surrounding areas. Incumbent Democrat Beto O'Rourke, who had represented the district since 2013, retired from his seat to challenge Senator Ted Cruz in the state's senate election. He was re-elected with 85.7% of the vote in 2016. The district had a PVI of D+17.

=== Democratic primary ===
==== Candidates ====
===== Nominee =====
- Veronica Escobar, former El Paso County judge

===== Eliminated in primary =====
- John Carillo, public radio executive
- Norma Chavez, former state representative
- Dori Fenebock, former El Paso Independent School Board president
- Enrique Garcia, immigration attorney
- Jerome Tilghman

===== Withdrawn =====
- Nicole LeClaire, schoolteacher

===== Declined =====
- Beto O'Rourke, incumbent U.S. representative (unsuccessfully ran for U.S. Senate)

==== Endorsements ====
Veronica Escobar

Labor unions

- AFL-CIO

==== Results ====
Democratic primary results
Party	Candidate	Votes	%
Democratic	Veronica Escobar	30,630	61.4
Democratic	Dori Fenenbock	10,992	22.0
Democratic	Norma Chavez	3,325	6.7
Democratic	Enrique Garcia	2,661	5.3
Democratic	Jerome Tilghman	1,489	3.0
Democratic	John Carrillo	771	1.6
Total votes		49,868	100.0

=== Republican primary ===
==== Candidates ====
===== Nominee =====
- Rick Seeberger

===== Eliminated in primary =====
- Alia Garcia-Ureste

==== Results ====
Republican primary results
Party	Candidate	Votes	%
Republican	Rick Seeberger	7,273	69.3
Republican	Alia Garcia-Ureste	3,216	30.7
Total votes		10,478	100.0

=== General election ===
==== Predictions ====
Source	Ranking	As of
The Cook Political Report	Safe D	November 5, 2018
Inside Elections	Safe D	November 5, 2018
Sabato's Crystal Ball	Safe D	November 5, 2018
RCP	Safe D	November 5, 2018
Daily Kos	Safe D	November 5, 2018
538	Safe D	November 7, 2018
CNN	Safe D	October 31, 2018
Politico	Safe D	November 4, 2018

==== Endorsements ====
Veronica Escobar (D)

Labor unions

- AFL-CIO
- Communications Workers of America
- International Brotherhood of Boilermakers

Organizations

- Congressional Progressive Caucus
- EMILY's List
- End Citizens United
- MoveOn
- New Democrat Coalition
- Our Revolution
- Progressive Change Campaign Committee

==== Results ====
Texas's 16th congressional district
Party	Candidate	Votes	%
Democratic	Veronica Escobar	124,437	68.5
Republican	Rick Seeberger	49,127	27.0
Independent	Ben Mendoza	8,147	4.5
Independent	Sam Williams (write-in)	43	0.0
Total votes		181,754	100
Democratic hold			

== District 17 ==
2018 Texas's 17th congressional district election
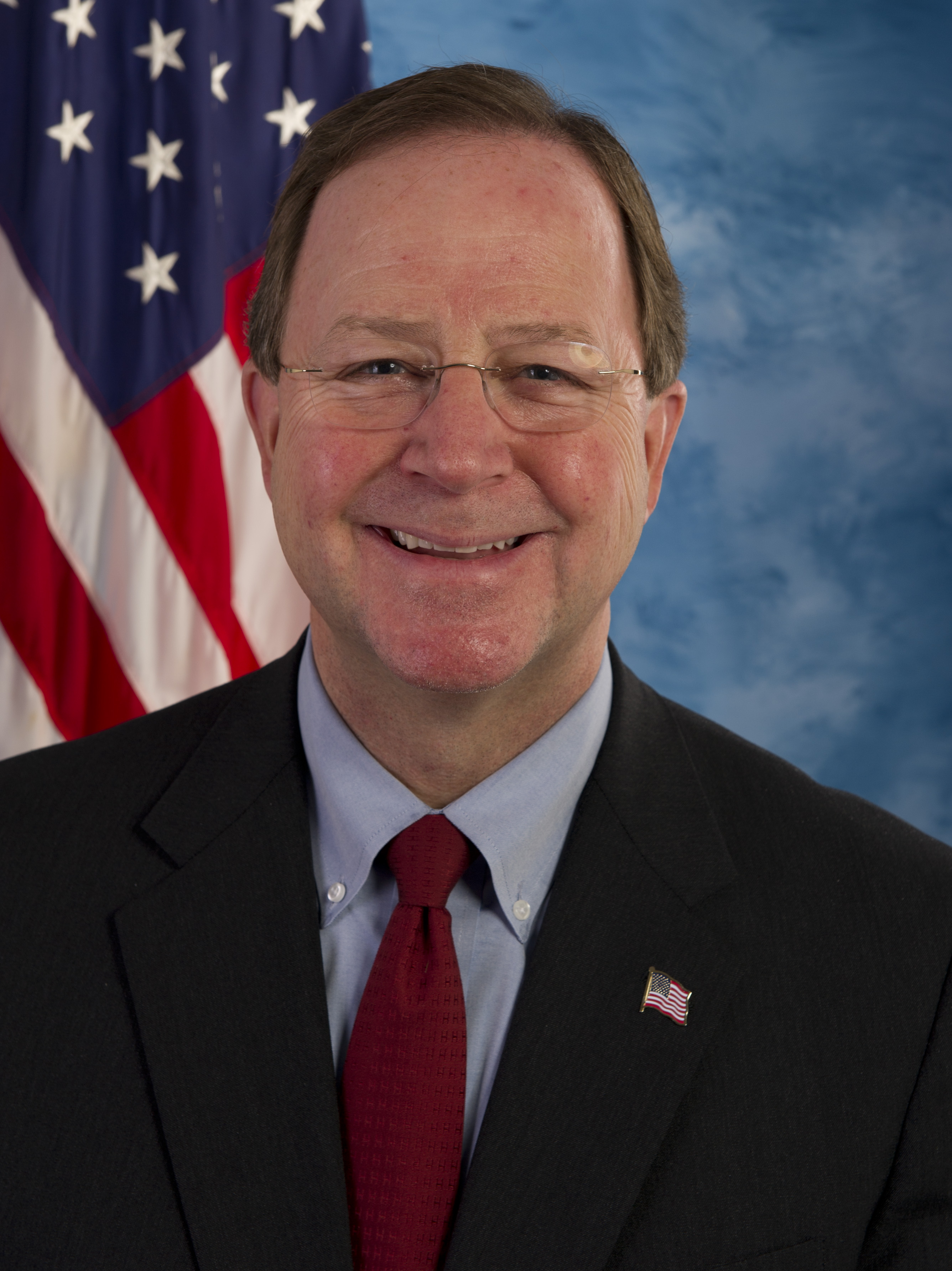

Nominee	Bill Flores	Rick Kennedy
Party	Republican	Democratic
Popular vote	134,841	98,070
Percentage	56.8%	41.3%
- County results Flores: 50–60% 60–70% 70–80% 80–90% Kennedy: 60–70%
U.S. Representative before election
Bill Flores
Republican
Elected U.S. Representative
Bill Flores
Republican

The 17th district is located in Central Texas including the Bryan-College station metro, Waco, and stretches to parts of North Austin. Incumbent Republican Bill Flores, who had represented the district since 2011, ran for re-election. He was re-elected with 60.8% of the vote in 2016. The district had a PVI of R+12.

=== Republican primary ===
==== Candidates ====
===== Nominee =====
- Bill Flores, incumbent U.S. representative

==== Results ====
Republican primary results
Party	Candidate	Votes	%
Republican	Bill Flores (incumbent)	44,388	100.0
Total votes		44,388	100.0

=== Democratic primary ===
==== Candidates ====
===== Nominee =====
- Rick Kennedy, software programmer

===== Eliminated in primary =====
- Dale Mantey, epidemiologist

===== Withdrawn =====
- Scott Sturm, paramedic

==== Endorsements ====
Rick Kennedy

Newspapers

- The Austin Chronicle
Dale Mantey

Labor unions

- AFL-CIO

==== Results ====
Democratic primary results
Party	Candidate	Votes	%
Democratic	Rick Kennedy	14,343	63.3
Democratic	Dale Mantey	8,300	36.7
Total votes		22,643	100.0

=== Libertarian primary ===
==== Candidates ====
===== Nominee =====
- Peter Churchman

===== Eliminated in primary =====
- Nicholas Becker

=== General election ===
==== Predictions ====
Source	Ranking	As of
The Cook Political Report	Safe R	November 5, 2018
Inside Elections	Safe R	November 5, 2018
Sabato's Crystal Ball	Safe R	November 5, 2018
RCP	Safe R	November 5, 2018
Daily Kos	Safe R	November 5, 2018
538	Safe R	November 7, 2018
CNN	Safe R	October 31, 2018
Politico	Safe R	November 4, 2018

==== Endorsements ====
Rick Kennedy (D)

Labor unions

- AFL-CIO
- International Brotherhood of Boilermakers

Newspapers

- The Austin Chronicle

==== Polling ====
Poll source	Date(s) administered	Sample size	Margin of error	Bill Flores (R)	Rick Kennedy (D)	Undecided
Change Research (D-Kennedy)	August 30 – September 1, 2018	961	–	54%	38%	8%

==== Results ====
Texas's 17th congressional district, 2018
Party	Candidate	Votes	%
Republican	Bill Flores (incumbent)	134,841	56.8
Democratic	Rick Kennedy	98,070	41.3
Libertarian	Peter Churchman	4,440	1.9
Total votes		237,351	100.0
Republican hold			

== District 18 ==
2018 Texas's 18th congressional district election
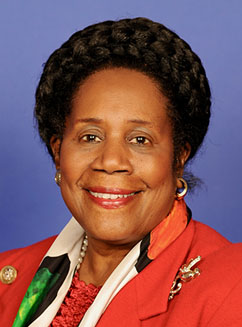

Nominee	Sheila Jackson Lee	Ava Reynero Pate
Party	Democratic	Republican
Popular vote	138,704	38,368
Percentage	75.2%	20.8%
- County results Lee: 70–80%
U.S. Representative before election
Sheila Jackson Lee
Democratic
Elected U.S. Representative
Sheila Jackson Lee
Democratic

The 18th district is centered on inner Houston and the surrounding area. It has been the Downtown Houston district since 1973. Incumbent Democratic Sheila Jackson Lee, who had represented the district since 1995, ran for re-election. She was re-elected with 73.5% of the vote in 2016. The district had a PVI of D+27.

=== Democratic primary ===
==== Candidates ====
===== Nominee =====
- Sheila Jackson Lee, incumbent U.S. representative

===== Eliminated in primary =====
- Richard Johnson

==== Endorsements ====
Sheila Jackson Lee

Labor unions

- AFL-CIO

Newspapers

- Houston Chronicle

==== Results ====
Democratic primary results
Party	Candidate	Votes	%
Democratic	Sheila Jackson Lee (incumbent)	34,514	86.0
Democratic	Richard Johnson	5,604	14.0
Total votes		40,118	100.0

=== Republican primary ===
==== Candidates ====
===== Nominee =====
- Ava Reynero Pate

==== Results ====
Republican primary results
Party	Candidate	Votes	%
Republican	Ava Reynero Pate	7,634	100.0
Total votes		7,634	100.0

=== Libertarian primary ===
==== Candidates ====
===== Nominee =====
- Luke Spencer

=== General election ===
==== Predictions ====
Source	Ranking	As of
The Cook Political Report	Safe D	November 5, 2018
Inside Elections	Safe D	November 5, 2018
Sabato's Crystal Ball	Safe D	November 5, 2018
RCP	Safe D	November 5, 2018
Daily Kos	Safe D	November 5, 2018
538	Safe D	November 7, 2018
CNN	Safe D	October 31, 2018
Politico	Safe D	November 4, 2018

==== Endorsements ====
Sheila Jackson Lee (D)

Labor unions

- AFL-CIO
- Communications Workers of America
- International Brotherhood of Boilermakers

Organizations

- Congressional Progressive Caucus

Newspapers

- Houston Chronicle

==== Results ====
Texas's 18th congressional district, 2018
Party	Candidate	Votes	%
Democratic	Sheila Jackson Lee (incumbent)	138,704	75.3
Republican	Ava Reynero Pate	38,368	20.8
Libertarian	Luke Spencer	4,067	2.2
Independent	Vince Duncan	3,193	1.7
Total votes		184,332	100
Democratic hold			

== District 19 ==
2018 Texas's 19th congressional district election
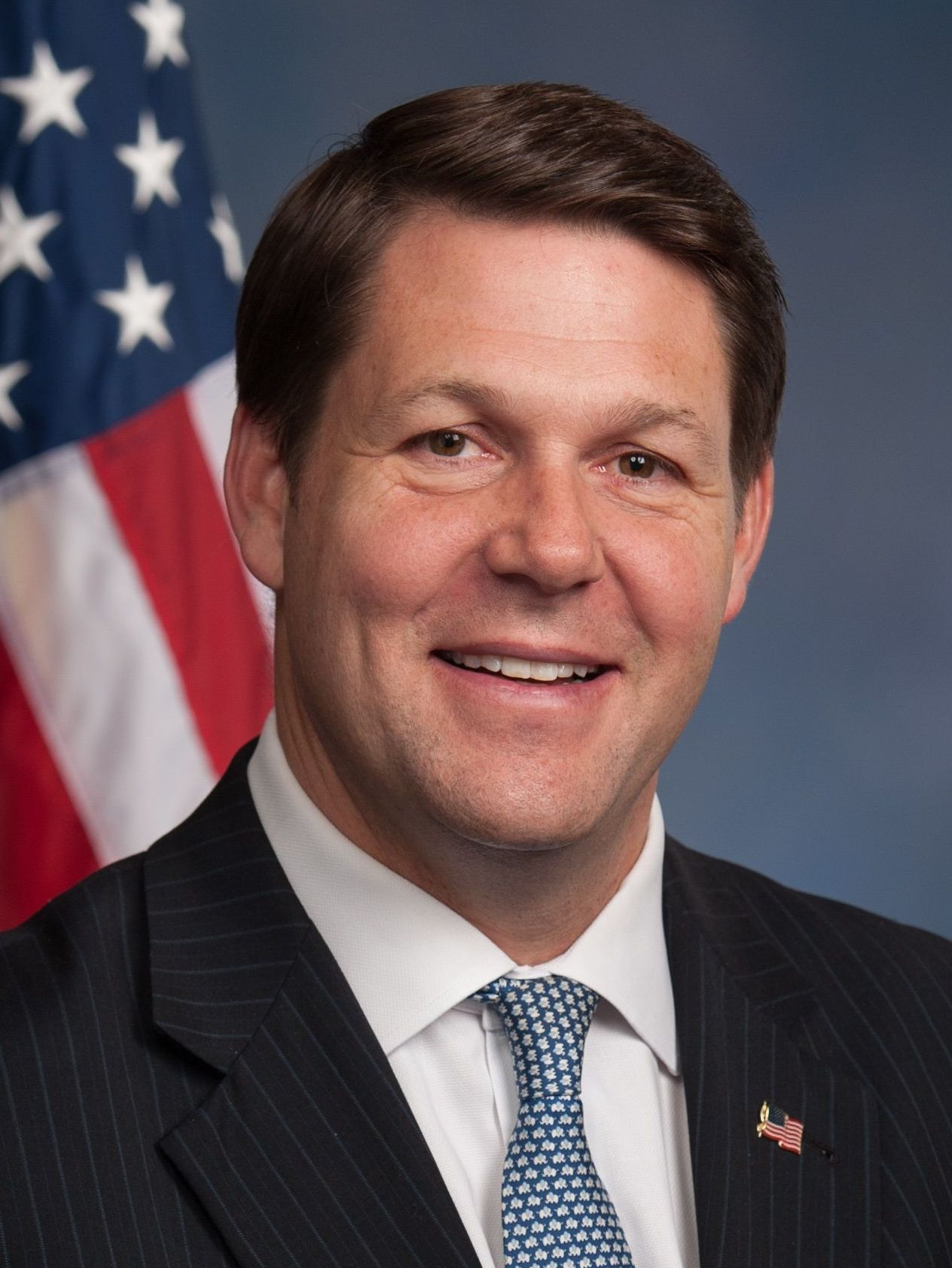

Nominee	Jodey Arrington	Miguel Levario
Party	Republican	Democratic
Popular vote	151,946	50,039
Percentage	75.2%	24.8%
- County results Arrington: 60–70% 70–80% 80–90% 90–100%
U.S. Representative before election
Jodey Arrington
Republican
Elected U.S. Representative
Jodey Arrington
Republican

The 19th district is located in upper rural West Texas, including Abilene, Lubbock, and Plainview. Incumbent Republican Jodey Arrington, who had represented the district since 2017, ran for re-election. He was elected with 86.7% of the vote in 2016. The district had a PVI of R+27.

=== Republican primary ===
==== Candidates ====
===== Nominee =====
- Jodey Arrington, incumbent U.S. representative

==== Results ====
Republican primary results
Party	Candidate	Votes	%
Republican	Jodey Arrington (incumbent)	55,433	100.0
Total votes		55,433	100.0

=== Democratic primary ===
==== Candidates ====
===== Nominee =====
- Miguel Levario

==== Endorsements ====
Miguel Levario

Labor unions

- AFL-CIO

==== Results ====
Democratic primary results
Party	Candidate	Votes	%
Democratic	Miguel Levario	9,648	100.0
Total votes		9,648	100.0

=== General election ===
==== Predictions ====
Source	Ranking	As of
The Cook Political Report	Safe R	November 5, 2018
Inside Elections	Safe R	November 5, 2018
Sabato's Crystal Ball	Safe R	November 5, 2018
RCP	Safe R	November 5, 2018
Daily Kos	Safe R	November 5, 2018
538	Safe R	November 7, 2018
CNN	Safe R	October 31, 2018
Politico	Safe R	November 4, 2018

==== Endorsements ====
Miguel Levario (D)

Labor unions

- AFL-CIO
- International Brotherhood of Boilermakers

==== Results ====
Texas's 19th congressional district, 2018
Party	Candidate	Votes	%
Republican	Jodey Arrington (incumbent)	151,946	75.2
Democratic	Miguel Levario	50,039	24.8
Total votes		201,985	100.0
Republican hold			

== District 20 ==
2018 Texas's 20th congressional district election
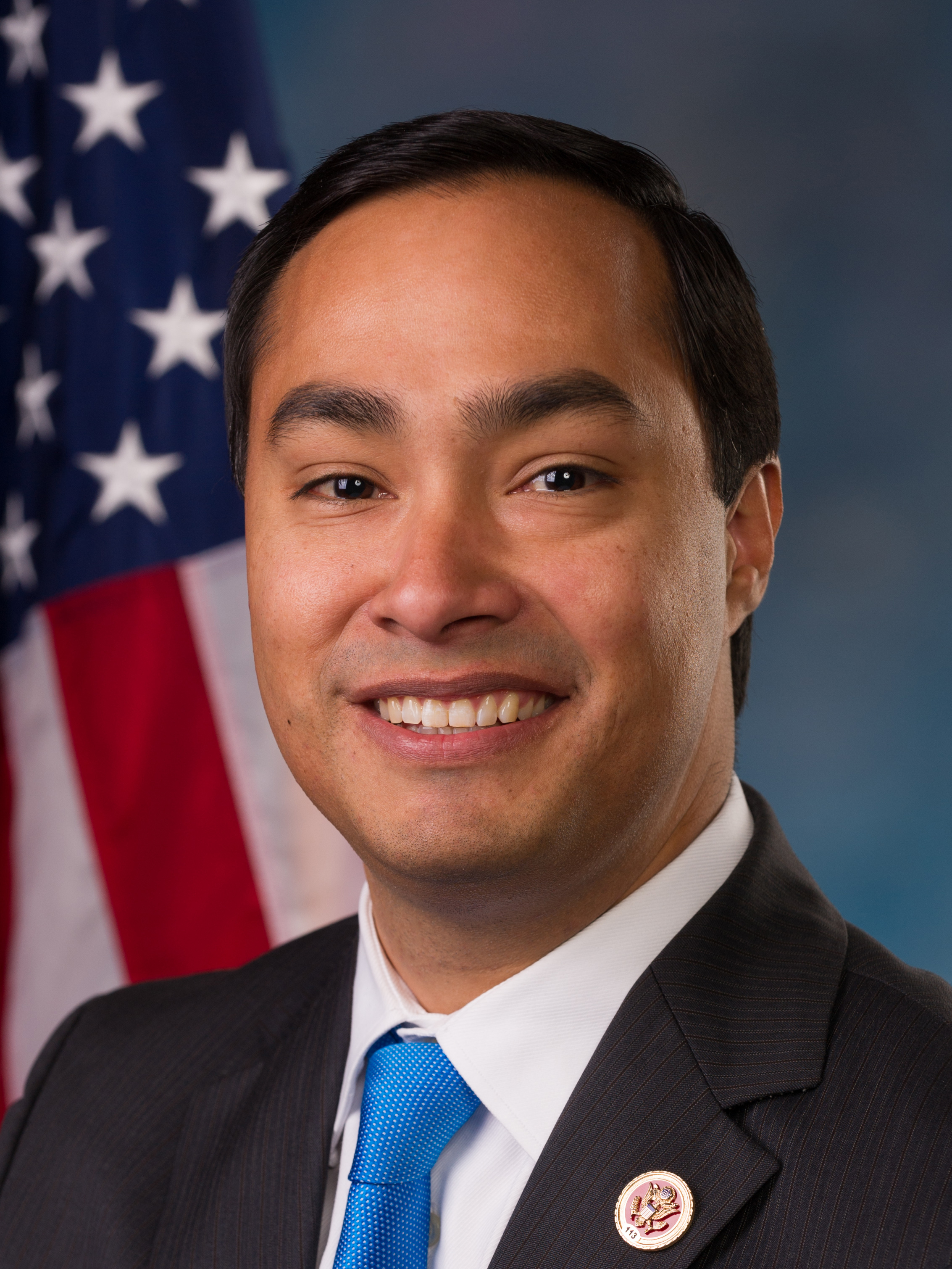

Nominee	Joaquín Castro	Jeffrey Blunt
Party	Democratic	Libertarian
Popular vote	139,038	32,925
Percentage	80.9%	19.1%
- County results Castro: 80–90%
U.S. Representative before election
Joaquín Castro
Democratic
Elected U.S. Representative
Joaquín Castro
Democratic

The 20th district is centered on the western half of San Antonio and the surrounding inner suburbs including Balcones Heights and Helotes. Incumbent Democrat Joaquín Castro, who had represented the district since 2013, ran for re-election. He was re-elected with 79.7% of the vote in 2016. The district had a PVI of D+10.

=== Democratic primary ===
==== Candidates ====
===== Nominee =====
- Joaquín Castro, incumbent U.S. representative

==== Endorsements ====
Joaquín Castro

Labor unions

- AFL-CIO

Organizations

- New Democrat Coalition

==== Results ====
Democratic primary results
Party	Candidate	Votes	%
Democratic	Joaquín Castro (incumbent)	32,189	100.0
Total votes		32,189	100.0

=== Libertarian primary ===
==== Candidates ====
===== Nominee =====
- Jeffrey Blunt

===== Eliminated in primary =====
- Michael "Commander" Idrogo
- Chuck Pena

=== General election ===
==== Predictions ====
Source	Ranking	As of
The Cook Political Report	Safe D	November 5, 2018
Inside Elections	Safe D	November 5, 2018
Sabato's Crystal Ball	Safe D	November 5, 2018
RCP	Safe D	November 5, 2018
Daily Kos	Safe D	November 5, 2018
538	Safe D	November 7, 2018
CNN	Safe D	October 31, 2018
Politico	Safe D	November 4, 2018

==== Endorsements ====
Joaquín Castro (D)

Labor unions

- AFL-CIO
- Communications Workers of America
- International Brotherhood of Boilermakers

Organizations

- End Citizens United
- New Democrat Coalition

==== Results ====
Texas's 20th congressional district, 2018
Party	Candidate	Votes	%
Democratic	Joaquín Castro (incumbent)	139,038	80.9
Libertarian	Jeffrey Blunt	32,925	19.1
Total votes		171,963	100.0
Democratic hold			

== District 21 ==
2018 Texas's 21st congressional district election
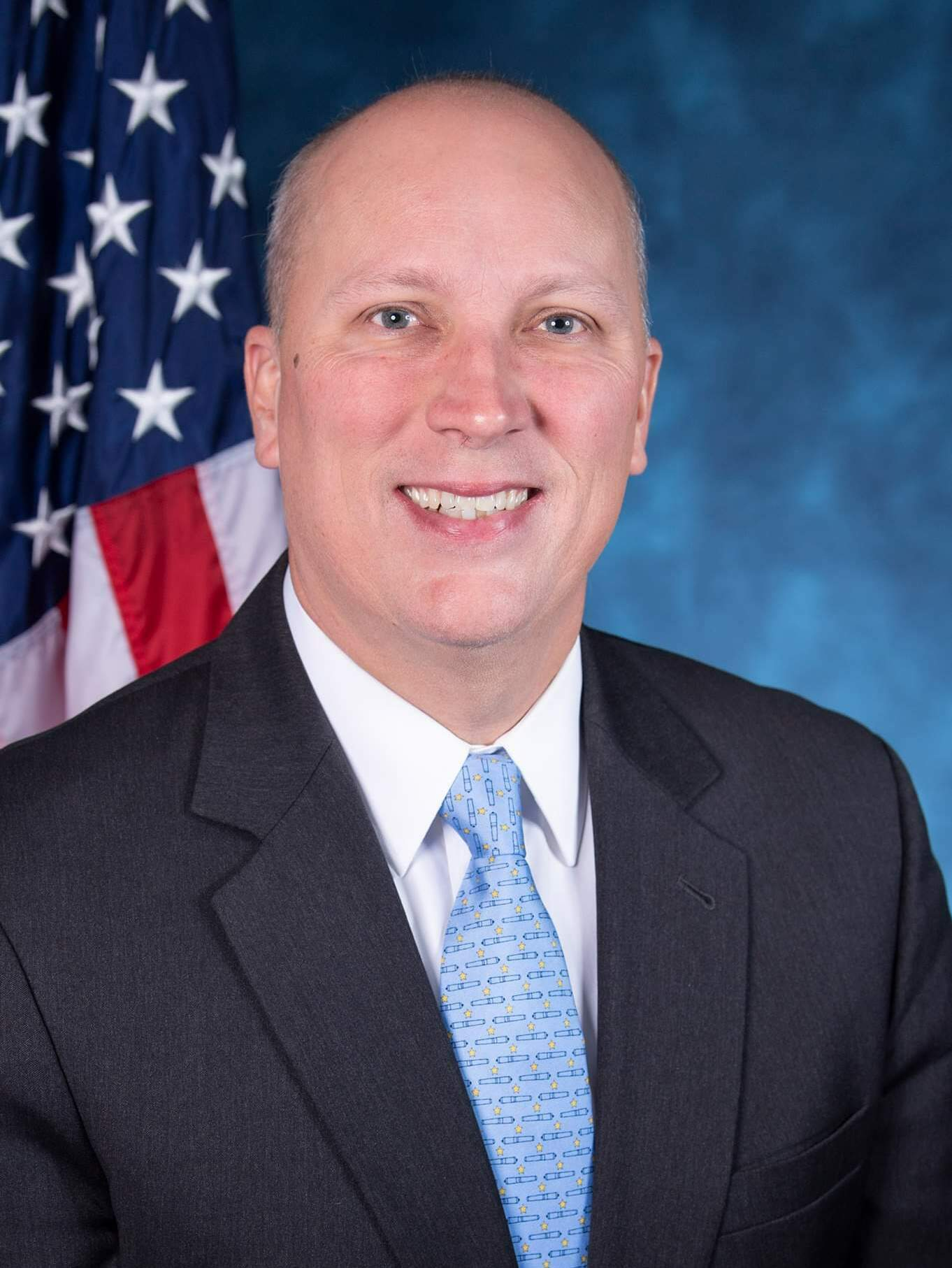

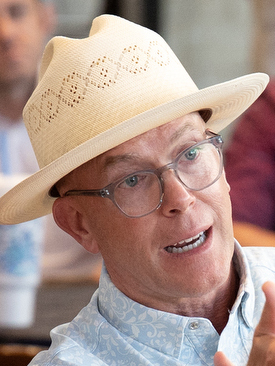
Nominee	Chip Roy	Joseph Kopser
Party	Republican	Democratic
Popular vote	177,654	168,421
Percentage	50.2%	47.6%
- County results Roy: 40–50% 70–80% 80–90% Kopser: 50–60% 70–80%
U.S. Representative before election
Lamar Smith
Republican
Elected U.S. Representative
Chip Roy
Republican

The 21st district starts in the San Antonio metro, including parts of north San Antonio and New Braunfels, extending into the Austin metro, taking in parts of San Marcos and south Austin. Incumbent Republican Lamar Smith, who had represented the district since 1987, announced in November 2017 that he would retire at the end of his current term, and not seek re-election. He was re-elected with 57.0% of the vote in 2016. The district had a PVI of R+10.

Run-off debates were held on April 12 after the primary, one hour each for the two Democratic candidates (audio) and the two Republican candidates (audio).

=== Republican primary ===
==== Candidates ====
===== Nominee =====
- Chip Roy, attorney, congressional aide

===== Eliminated in primary =====
- Ivan Andarza, immigration attorney
- Eric Burkart, CIA officer, author, community planner and organizer
- Quico Canseco, banker, attorney and former U.S. representative for Texas's 23rd congressional district (2011–2013)
- Mauro Garza, business owner and scientist
- Foster Hagen
- Jason Isaac, state representative
- Ryan Krause, businessman
- Matt McCall, small business owner, businessman and candidate for this seat in 2014 & 2016
- Susan Narvaiz, former mayor of San Marcos, businesswoman, former president and CEO of Core Strategies, Inc. and nominee for the 35th District in 2012, 2014 & 2016
- William Negley, non-profit founder, organizer, CIA intelligence officer and congressional aide
- Al Poteet, businessman and US Army veteran
- Autry Pruitt, political commentator, author and activist
- Jenifer Sarver, businesswoman, congressional aide and former Department of Commerce official
- Robert Stovall, former chair of the Bexar County Republican Party, chemist and financial advisor
- Samuel Temple, psychologist and AT&T staffer
- Peggy Wardlaw, businesswoman and rancher
- Anthony White

===== Declined =====
- Lamar Smith, incumbent U.S. representative

==== Results ====
Chip Roy and Matt McCall advanced to the runoff.

Republican primary results
Party	Candidate	Votes	%
Republican	Chip Roy	19,319	27.1
Republican	Matt McCall	12,088	16.9
Republican	William Negley	11,088	15.5
Republican	Jason Isaac	7,165	10.0
Republican	Jenifer Sarver	4,001	5.6
Republican	Robert Stovall	3,396	4.7
Republican	Susan Narvaiz	2,710	3.8
Republican	Francisco Canseco	2,484	3.5
Republican	Ryan Krause	2,289	3.2
Republican	Al M. Poteet	1,292	1.8
Republican	Peggy Wardlaw	1,281	1.8
Republican	Samuel Temple	1,017	1.4
Republican	Anthony J. White	949	1.3
Republican	Eric Burkhart	719	1.0
Republican	Mauro Garza	657	0.9
Republican	Autry J. Pruitt	454	0.6
Republican	Foster Hagen	392	0.5
Republican	Ivan A. Andarza	95	0.1
Total votes		71,396	100.0

==== Runoff results ====
Republican primary runoff results
Party	Candidate	Votes	%
Republican	Chip Roy	17,856	52.6
Republican	Matt McCall	16,081	47.4
Total votes		33,937	100.0

=== Democratic primary ===
==== Candidates ====
===== Nominee =====
- Joseph Kopser, aerospace engineer, US military veteran, businessman, entrepreneur

===== Eliminated in primary =====
- Derrick Crowe, businessman, non-profit founder, congressional aide
- Elliott McFadden, businessman, Peace Corps member, former executive director of the Travis County Democratic Party, consultant, former executive at AustinCarShare, Austin B-Cycle executive director, communications coordinator
- Mary Street Wilson, pastor, teacher, math professor, social justice activist

==== Endorsements ====
Derrick Crowe

Organizations

- Justice Democrats (joint with Wilson)
- Our Revolution

Newspapers

- The Austin Chronicle (joint with McFadden)
Elliott McFadden

Newspapers

- The Austin Chronicle (joint with Crowe)
Mary Street Wilson

Organizations

- Justice Democrats (joint with Crowe)

==== Results ====
Mary Street Wilson and Joseph Kopser advanced to the runoff.

Democratic primary results
Party	Candidate	Votes	%
Democratic	Mary Street Wilson	15,669	30.9
Democratic	Joseph Kopser	14,684	29.0
Democratic	Derrick Crowe	11,686	23.1
Democratic	Elliott McFadden	8,625	17.0
Total votes		50,664	100.0

==== Runoff results ====
Democratic primary runoff results
Party	Candidate	Votes	%
Democratic	Joseph Kopser	14,636	57.9
Democratic	Mary Street Wilson	10,622	42.1
Total votes		25,258	100.0

=== Libertarian primary ===
==== Candidates ====
===== Nominee =====
- Lee Santos

===== Eliminated in primary =====
- Mark Loewe
- Gil Robinson

=== General election ===
==== Endorsements ====
Chip Roy (R)

Organizations

- House Freedom Caucus
- Tea Party Express
Joseph Kopser (D)

Labor unions

- AFL-CIO
- International Brotherhood of Boilermakers

Organizations

- Congressional Progressive Caucus
- Democratic Congressional Campaign Committee "Red to Blue" Program
- End Citizens United
- New Democrat Coalition "Watch List"
- VoteVets

Newspapers

- The Austin Chronicle

==== Polling ====
Poll source	Date(s) administered	Sample size	Margin of error	Chip Roy (R)	Joseph Kopser (D)	Lee Santos (L)	Undecided
WPA Intelligence (R-CLF)	October 17–20, 2018	401	± 4.9%	50%	38%	2%	10%
Change Research (D)	July 5–9, 2018	672	± 4.0%	33%	27%	5%	35%

==== Predictions ====
Source	Ranking	As of
The Cook Political Report	Likely R	November 5, 2018
Inside Elections	Likely R	November 5, 2018
Sabato's Crystal Ball	Likely R	November 5, 2018
RCP	Likely R	November 5, 2018
Daily Kos	Likely R	November 5, 2018
538	Likely R	November 7, 2018
CNN	Likely R	October 31, 2018
Politico	Likely R	November 4, 2018

==== Results ====
Texas's 21st congressional district, 2018
Party	Candidate	Votes	%
Republican	Chip Roy	177,654	50.3
Democratic	Joseph Kopser	168,421	47.6
Libertarian	Lee Santos	7,542	2.1
Total votes		353,617	100.0
Republican hold			

== District 22 ==
2018 Texas's 22nd congressional district election
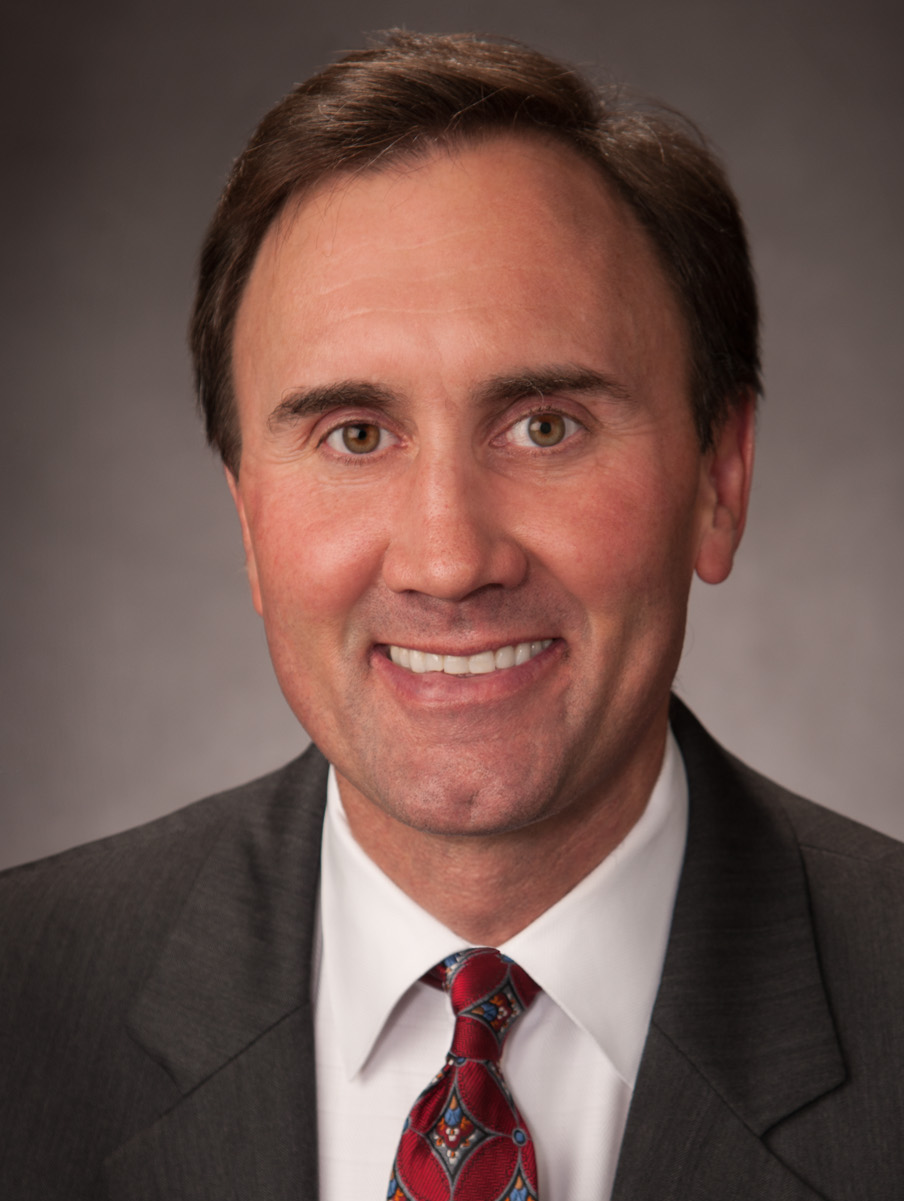

Nominee	Pete Olson	Sri Preston Kulkarni
Party	Republican	Democratic
Popular vote	152,750	138,153
Percentage	51.4%	46.5%
- County results Olson: 40–50% 50–60%
U.S. Representative before election
Pete Olson
Republican
Elected U.S. Representative
Pete Olson
Republican

The 22nd district is located Greater Houston taking in suburban areas of Friendswood, Pearland, and Sugar Land. Incumbent Republican Pete Olson, who had represented the district since 2009, ran for re-election. He was re-elected with 59.5% of the vote in 2016. The district had a PVI of R+10.

=== Republican primary ===
==== Candidates ====
===== Nominee =====
- Pete Olson, incumbent U.S. representative

===== Eliminated in primary =====
- James Green
- Danny Nguyen
- Eric Zmrhal

==== Results ====
Republican primary results
Party	Candidate	Votes	%
Republican	Pete Olson (incumbent)	35,782	78.4
Republican	Danny Nguyen	6,170	13.5
Republican	James Green	2,521	5.5
Republican	Eric Zmrhal	1,174	2.6
Total votes		45,647	100

=== Democratic primary ===
==== Candidates ====
===== Nominee =====
- Sri Preston Kulkarni, former diplomat

===== Eliminated in primary =====
- Steve Brown
- Mark Gibson
- Margarita Ruiz Johnson
- Letitia Plummer, dentist

==== Endorsements ====
Steve Brown

Organizations

- Our Revolution
Letitia Plummer

Labor unions

- Communications Workers of America
Sri Preston Kulkarni

Labor unions

- AFL-CIO

Newspapers

- Houston Chronicle

==== Results ====
Democratic primary results
Party	Candidate	Votes	%
Democratic	Sri Preston Kulkarni	9,466	31.8
Democratic	Letitia Plummer	7,230	24.3
Democratic	Steve Brown	6,246	21.0
Democratic	Margarita Ruiz Johnson	3,767	12.7
Democratic	Mark Gibson	3,046	10.2
Total votes		29,755	100.0

=== Runoff results ===
Democratic primary runoff results
Party	Candidate	Votes	%
Democratic	Sri Preston Kulkarni	9,502	62.1
Democratic	Letitia Plummer	5,794	37.9
Total votes		15,296	100.0

=== Libertarian primary ===
==== Candidates ====
===== Nominee =====
- John B. McElligott

=== General election ===
==== Campaign ====
Because Texas's 22nd congressional district is one of the most diverse in Texas, the Kulkarni campaign took the unorthodox approach of reaching out to infrequent voters in their own neighborhoods and languages, including Gujarati, Marathi, Tamil and Mandarin. If elected, Kulkarni would have become the first Asian-American ever to serve in the Texas congressional delegation.

==== Endorsements ====
Sri Preston Kulkarni (D)

Labor unions

- AFL-CIO
- International Brotherhood of Boilermakers

Organizations

- Democratic Congressional Campaign Committee "Red to Blue" Program
- End Citizens United
- MoveOn

Newspapers

- Houston Chronicle

==== Predictions ====
Source	Ranking	As of
The Cook Political Report	Lean R	November 5, 2018
Inside Elections	Safe R	November 5, 2018
Sabato's Crystal Ball	Likely R	November 5, 2018
RCP	Likely R	November 5, 2018
Daily Kos	Safe R	November 5, 2018
538	Likely R	November 7, 2018
CNN	Safe R	October 31, 2018
Politico	Likely R	November 4, 2018

==== Results ====
Despite being out-fundraised by Kulkarni, Olson won re-election in the district's closest race since he was first elected in 2008.

Texas's 22nd congressional district, 2018
Party	Candidate	Votes	%
Republican	Pete Olson (incumbent)	152,750	51.4
Democratic	Sri Preston Kulkarni	138,153	46.4
Libertarian	John McElligott	3,261	1.1
Independent	Kellen Sweny	3,241	1.1
Total votes		297,405	100.0
Republican hold			

== District 23 ==
2018 Texas's 23rd congressional district election
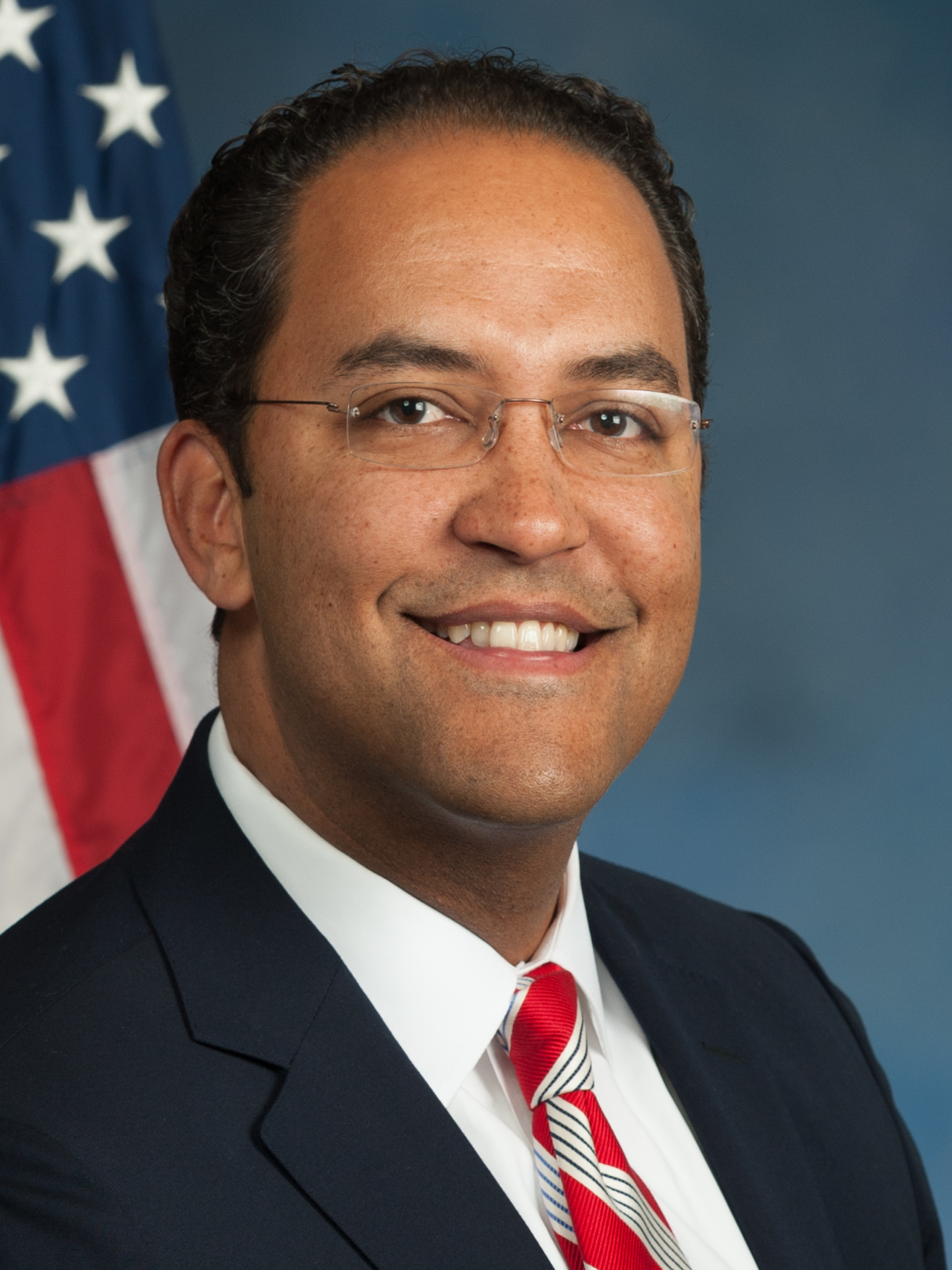

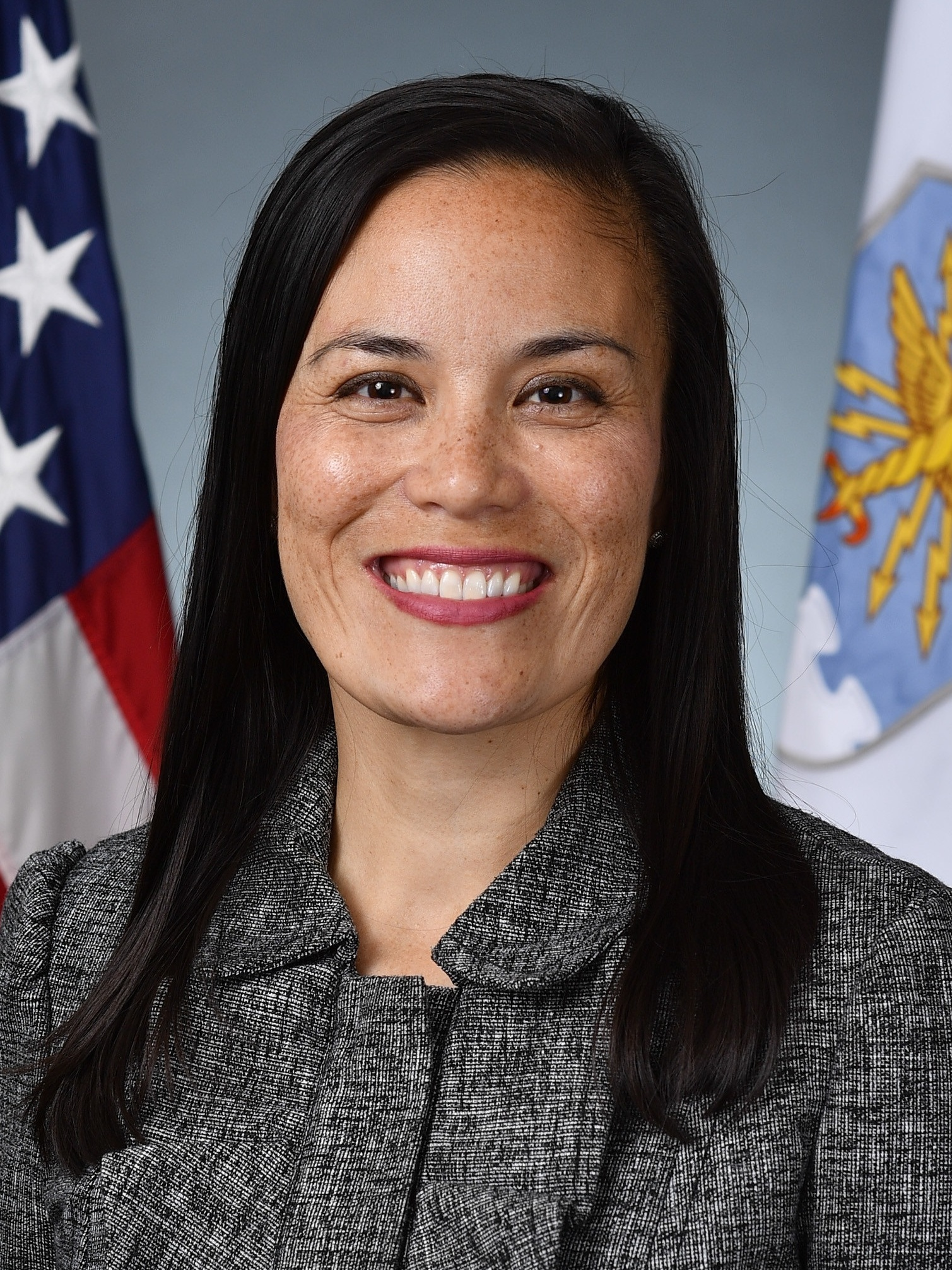
Nominee	Will Hurd	Gina Ortiz Jones
Party	Republican	Democratic
Popular vote	103,285	102,359
Percentage	49.2%	48.7%
- County results Hurd: 50–60% 60–70% 70–80% 80–90% Ortiz Jones: 40–50% 50–60% 60–70% 70–80%
U.S. Representative before election
Will Hurd
Republican
Elected U.S. Representative
Will Hurd
Republican

The 23rd district stretches from rural Southwestern Texas, including Alpine, Del Rio, and Socorro, into the Greater San Antonio area, taking in Hondo and the outer areas of San Antonio. It is a prominently Hispanic-majority district. Incumbent Republican Will Hurd, who had represented the district since 2015, ran for re-election. He was narrowly re-elected with 48.7% of the vote in 2016. The district had a PVI of R+1.

=== Republican primary ===
==== Candidates ====
===== Nominee =====
- Will Hurd, incumbent U.S. representative

===== Eliminated in primary =====
- Alma Arredondo-Lynch

==== Results ====
Republican primary results
Party	Candidate	Votes	%
Republican	Will Hurd (incumbent)	24,866	80.2
Republican	Alma Arredondo-Lynch	6,126	19.8
Total votes		30,992	100

=== Democratic primary ===
==== Candidates ====
===== Nominee =====
- Gina Ortiz Jones, Air Force veteran (D-San Antonio)

===== Eliminated in primary =====
- Judith Ann Canales, former officer of the United States Department of Housing and Urban Development (D-San Antonio)
- Jay Hulings, former United States attorney for the Western District of Texas
- Ivan Sanchez
- Ricardo Jose Treviño Jr., schoolteacher
- Angela Villescaz

===== Declined =====
- Pete Gallego, former U.S. representative

==== Endorsements ====
Jay Hulings

Labor unions

- AFL-CIO

Organizations

- New Democrat Coalition "Watch List"
Rick Treviño

Organizations

- Brand New Congress
- Justice Democrats
- Our Revolution

==== Results ====
Democratic primary results
Party	Candidate	Votes	%
Democratic	Gina Ortiz Jones	18,382	41.5
Democratic	Rick Treviño	7,748	17.5
Democratic	Judy Canales	7,532	17.0
Democratic	Jay Hulings	6,640	14.9
Democratic	Angela "Angie" Villescaz	4,018	9.1
Total votes		44,320	100

=== Runoff results ===
Democratic primary runoff results
Party	Candidate	Votes	%
Democratic	Gina Ortiz Jones	17,538	67.9
Democratic	Rick Treviño	8,289	32.1
Total votes		25,827	100

=== Libertarian primary ===
==== Candidates ====
===== Nominee =====
- Ruben Corvalan

=== General election ===
==== Endorsements ====
Will Hurd (R)

U.S. executive branch officials

- George W. Bush, 43rd president of the United States

Organizations

- BIPAC
- National Republican Congressional Committee "Patriot" Program
Gina Ortiz Jones (D)

Labor unions

- AFL-CIO
- Communications Workers of America
- International Brotherhood of Boilermakers

Organizations

- Congressional Progressive Caucus
- Democratic Congressional Campaign Committee "Red to Blue" Program
- EMILY's List
- End Citizens United
- MoveOn
- VoteVets
- With Honor Fund

==== Polling ====
Poll source	Date(s) administered	Sample size	Margin of error	Will Hurd (R)	Gina Ortiz Jones (D)	Ruben Corvalan (L)	Undecided
NYT Upshot/Siena College	October 13–18, 2018	488	± 5.0%	53%	38%	1%	7%
GS Strategy Group (R-CLF)	October 2–4, 2018	400	± 4.9%	55%	30%	5%	10%
NYT Upshot/Siena College	September 10–11, 2018	495	± 5.0%	51%	43%	–	7%

Hypothetical polling

Poll source	Date(s) administered	Sample size	Margin of error	Will Hurd (R)	Democratic candidate	Other	Undecided
Public Policy Polling (D)	February 12–13, 2018	659	± 3.8%	44%	43%	–	13%

==== Predictions ====
Source	Ranking	As of
The Cook Political Report	Lean R	November 5, 2018
Inside Elections	Lean R	November 5, 2018
Sabato's Crystal Ball	Lean R	November 5, 2018
RCP	Lean R	November 5, 2018
Daily Kos	Lean R	November 5, 2018
538	Likely R	November 7, 2018
CNN	Lean R	October 31, 2018
Politico	Lean R	November 4, 2018

==== Results ====
Gina Ortiz Jones conceded the race on November 19, 2018, after losing by around 1,150 votes.

Texas's 23rd congressional district, 2018
Party	Candidate	Votes	%
Republican	Will Hurd (incumbent)	103,285	49.2
Democratic	Gina Ortiz Jones	102,359	48.7
Libertarian	Ruben Corvalan	4,425	2.1
Total votes		210,069	100
Republican hold			

== District 24 ==
2018 Texas's 24th congressional district election
- November 6, 2018
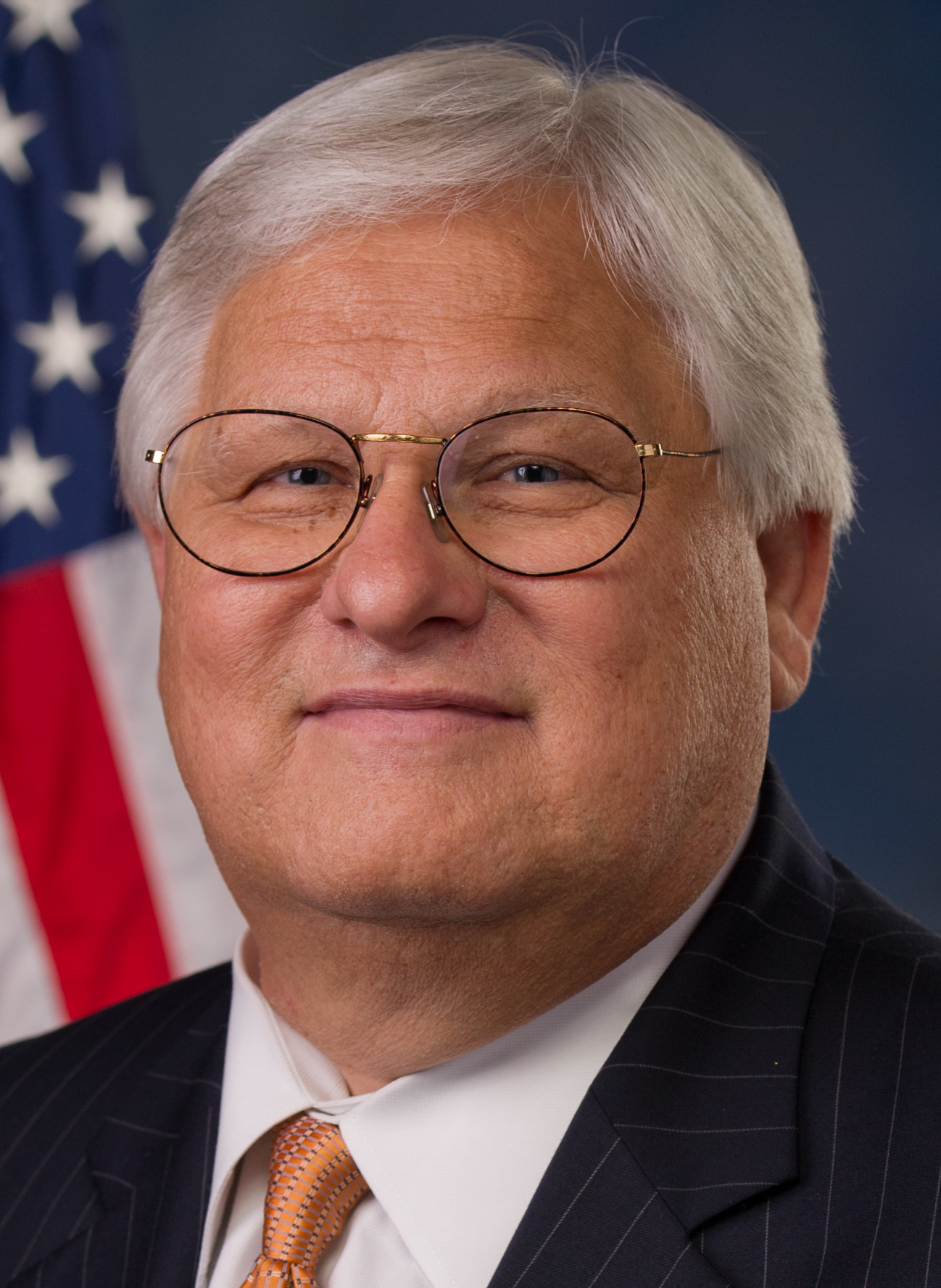

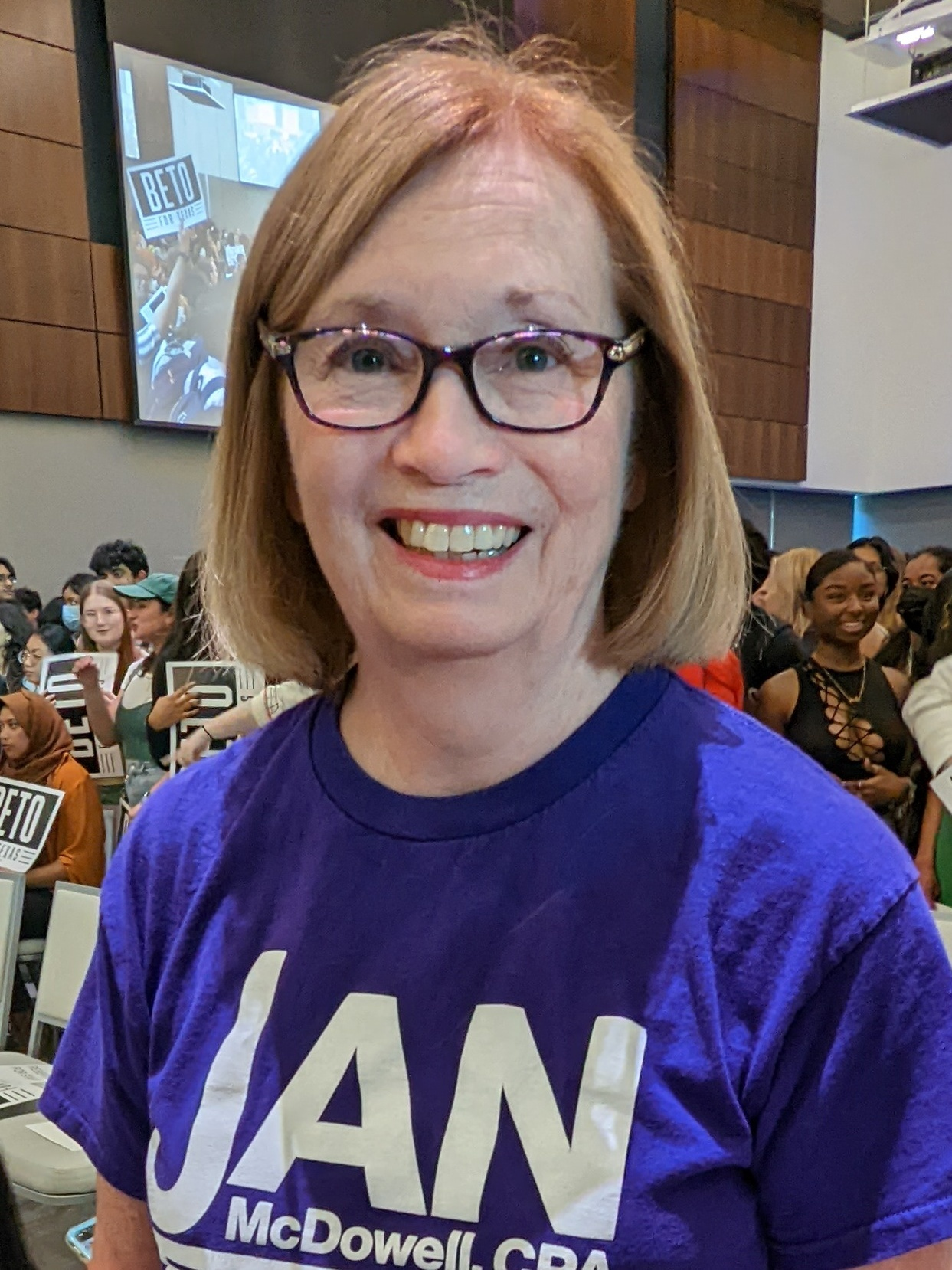
Nominee	Kenny Marchant	Jan McDowell
Party	Republican	Democratic
Popular vote	133,317	125,231
Percentage	50.6%	47.5%
- County results Marchant: 50–60% McDowell: 50–60%
U.S. Representative before election
Kenny Marchant
Republican
Elected U.S. Representative
Kenny Marchant
Republican

The 24th district is centered around Mid-Cities suburbs of the Dallas–Fort Worth metroplex including Bedford, Carrollton, and Euless. Incumbent Republican Kenny Marchant, who had represented the district since 2005, ran for re-election. He was re-elected with 56.2% of the vote in 2016. The district had a PVI of R+9.

=== Republican primary ===
==== Candidates ====
===== Nominee =====
- Kenny Marchant, incumbent U.S. representative

===== Eliminated in primary =====
- Johnathan Kyle Davidson

==== Endorsements ====
Kenny Marchant

Newspapers

- Dallas Morning News

==== Results ====
Republican primary results
Party	Candidate	Votes	%
Republican	Kenny Marchant (incumbent)	30,310	74.4
Republican	Johnathan Kyle Davidson	10,425	25.6
Total votes		40,735	100

=== Democratic primary ===
==== Candidates ====
===== Nominee =====
- Jan McDowell, accountant

===== Eliminated in primary =====
- Edward Allen
- John Biggan
- Joshua Andrew Imhoff

==== Endorsements ====
Jan McDowell

Newspapers

- Dallas Morning News

==== Results ====
Democratic primary results
Party	Candidate	Votes	%
Democratic	Jan McDowell	14,551	52.5
Democratic	John Biggan	5,970	21.5
Democratic	Edward "Todd" Allen	5,556	20.0
Democratic	Josh Imhoff	1,663	6.0
Total votes		27,740	100

=== Libertarian primary ===
==== Candidates ====
===== Nominee =====
- Mike Kolls

===== Eliminated in primary =====
- Emmanuel Lewis
- Roland Rangel

=== General election ===
==== Endorsements ====
Kenny Marchant (R)

Newspapers

- Dallas Morning News
Jan McDowell (D)

Labor unions

- AFL-CIO
- International Brotherhood of Boilermakers

==== Predictions ====
Source	Ranking	As of
The Cook Political Report	Likely R	November 5, 2018
Inside Elections	Safe R	November 5, 2018
Sabato's Crystal Ball	Safe R	November 5, 2018
RCP	Safe R	November 5, 2018
Daily Kos	Safe R	November 5, 2018
538	Safe R	November 7, 2018
CNN	Safe R	October 31, 2018
Politico	Likely R	November 4, 2018

==== Results ====
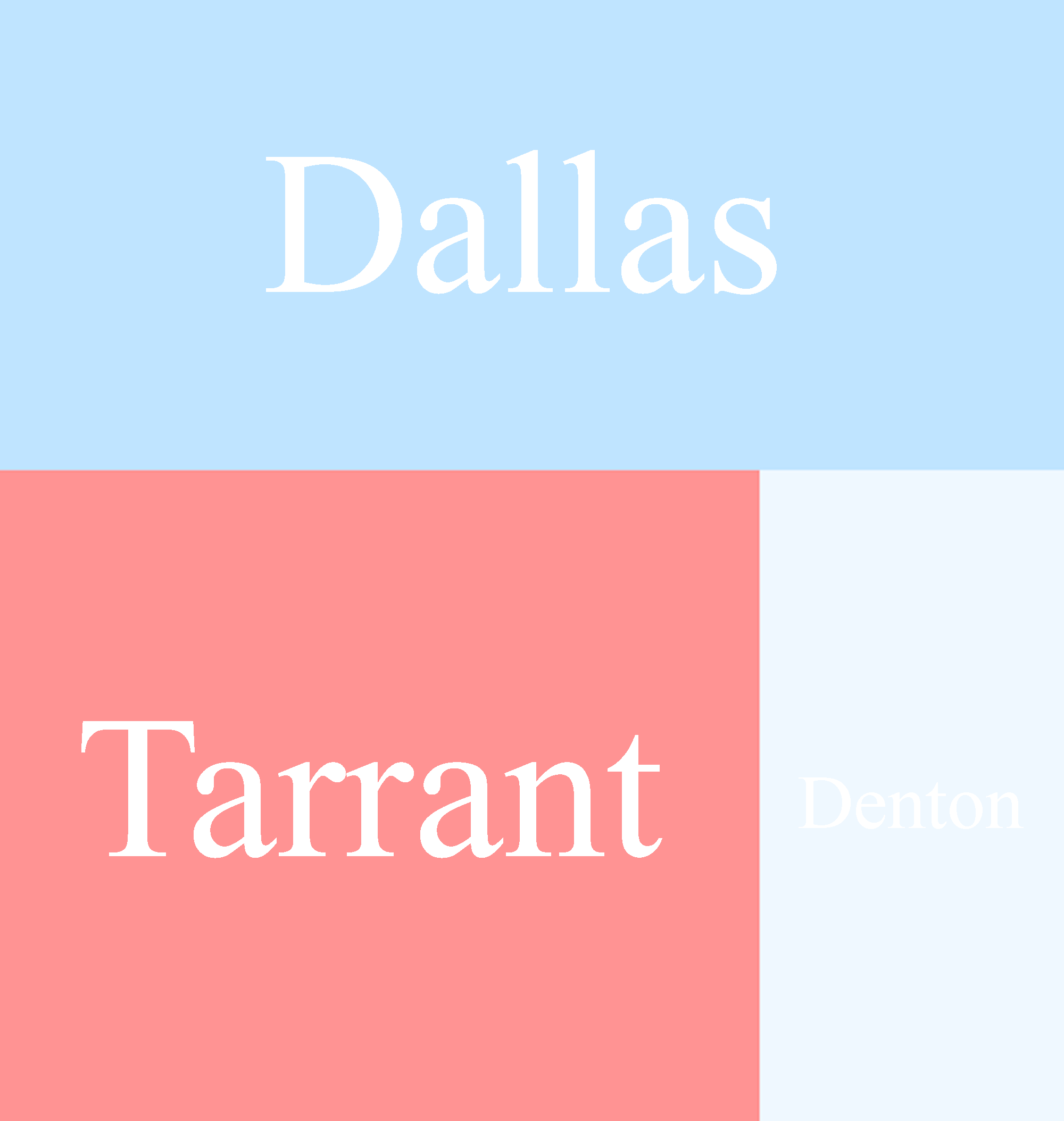
Cartogram of Texas' 24th Congressional District

Texas's 24th congressional district, 2018
Party	Candidate	Votes	%
Republican	Kenny Marchant (incumbent)	133,317	50.6
Democratic	Jan McDowell	125,231	47.5
Libertarian	Mike Kolls	4,870	1.9
Total votes		263,418	100
Republican hold			

== District 25 ==
2018 Texas's 25th congressional district election
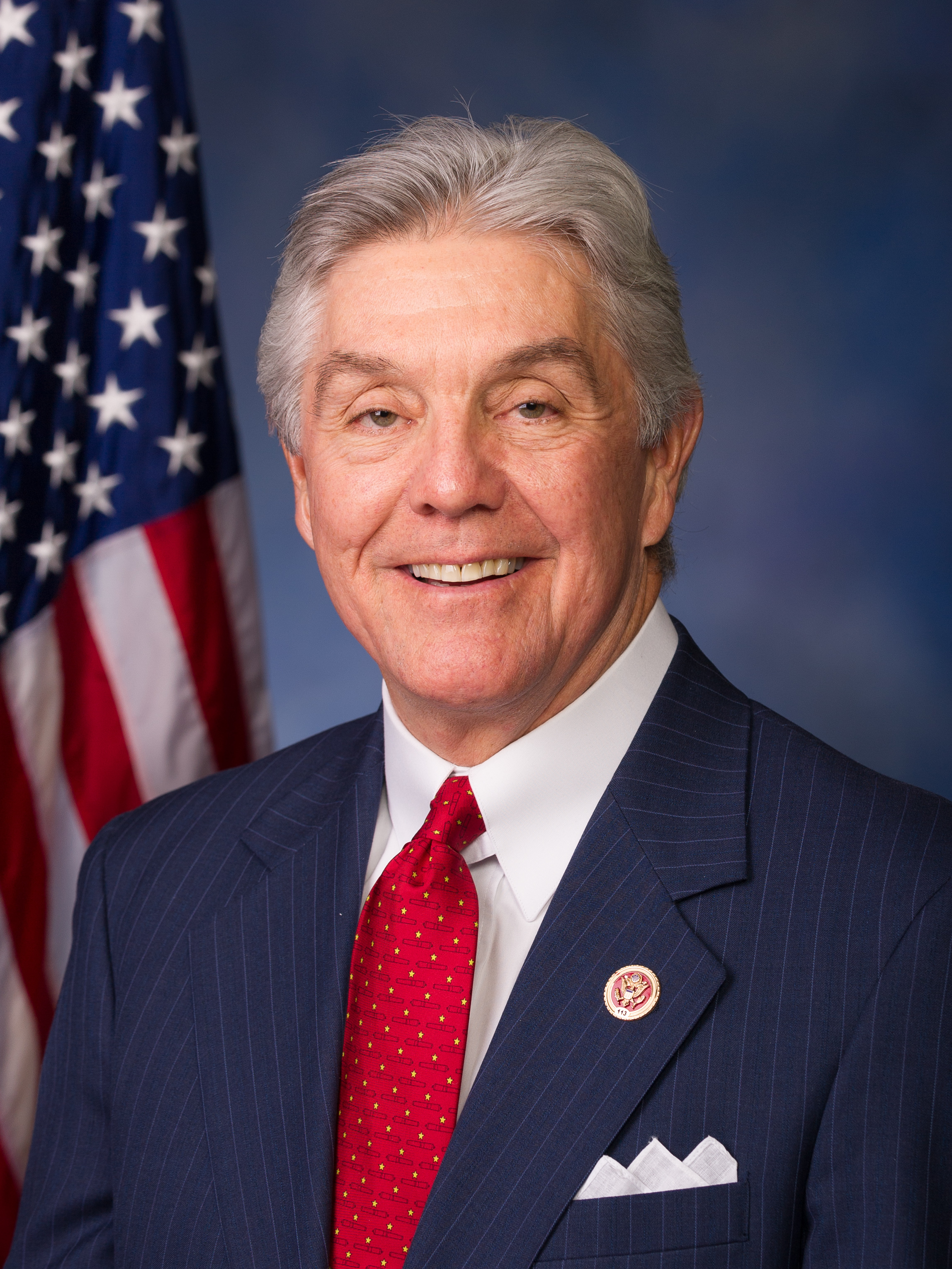

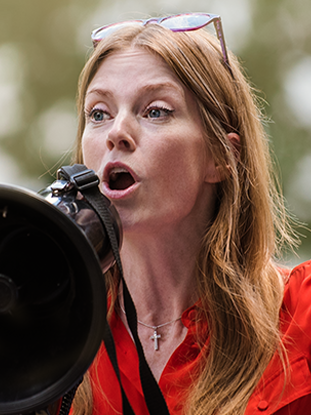
Nominee	Roger Williams	Julie Oliver
Party	Republican	Democratic
Popular vote	163,023	136,385
Percentage	53.5%	44.8%
- County results Williams: 50–60% 60–70% 70–80% 80–90% Oliver: 60–70% 70–80%
U.S. Representative before election
Roger Williams
Republican
Elected U.S. Representative
Roger Williams
Republican

The 25th district stretches from the outer suburbs of Fort Worth, including Burleson and Cleburne down into rural Central Texas, and takes in the Austin exurbs of Dripping Springs, Lakeway, West Lake Hills, and parts of downtown Austin. Incumbent Republican Roger Williams, who had represented the district since 2013, ran for re-election. He was re-elected with 58.4% of the vote in 2016. The district had a PVI of R+11.

=== Republican primary ===
==== Candidates ====
===== Nominee =====
- Roger Williams, incumbent U.S. representative

==== Results ====
Republican primary results
Party	Candidate	Votes	%
Republican	Roger Williams (incumbent)	51,122	100.0
Total votes		51,122	100.0

=== Democratic primary ===
==== Candidates ====
===== Nominee =====
- Julie Oliver

===== Eliminated in primary =====
- West Hansen, health care professional
- Chetan Panda
- Chris Perri
- Kathi Thomas, small business owner, former precinct chair for Hays County Democrats, nominee for state senate in 2006 and for this seat in 2016

==== Endorsements ====
Chris Perri

Labor unions

- AFL-CIO

Newspapers

- The Austin Chronicle

==== Results ====
Democratic primary results
Party	Candidate	Votes	%
Democratic	Chris Perri	13,896	32.8
Democratic	Julie Oliver	11,220	26.4
Democratic	Kathi Thomas	8,976	21.2
Democratic	West Hansen	4,479	10.6
Democratic	Chetan Panda	3,835	9.0
Total votes		42,406	100.0

==== Runoff results ====
Democratic primary runoff results
Party	Candidate	Votes	%
Democratic	Julie Oliver	12,005	52.2
Democratic	Chris Perri	10,984	47.8
Total votes		22,989	100

=== Libertarian primary ===
==== Candidates ====
===== Nominee =====
- Desarae Lindsey

=== General election ===
==== Endorsements ====
Julie Oliver (D)

Labor unions

- AFL-CIO
- International Brotherhood of Boilermakers

Organizations

- End Citizens United

Newspapers

- The Austin Chronicle

==== Predictions ====
Source	Ranking	As of
The Cook Political Report	Safe R	November 5, 2018
Inside Elections	Safe R	November 5, 2018
Sabato's Crystal Ball	Safe R	November 5, 2018
RCP	Safe R	November 5, 2018
Daily Kos	Safe R	November 5, 2018
538	Likely R	November 7, 2018
CNN	Safe R	October 31, 2018
Politico	Likely R	November 4, 2018

==== Results ====
Texas's 25th congressional district, 2018
Party	Candidate	Votes	%
Republican	Roger Williams (incumbent)	163,023	53.5
Democratic	Julie Oliver	136,385	44.8
Libertarian	Desarae Lindsey	5,145	1.7
Total votes		304,553	100
Republican hold			

== District 26 ==
2018 Texas's 26th congressional district election
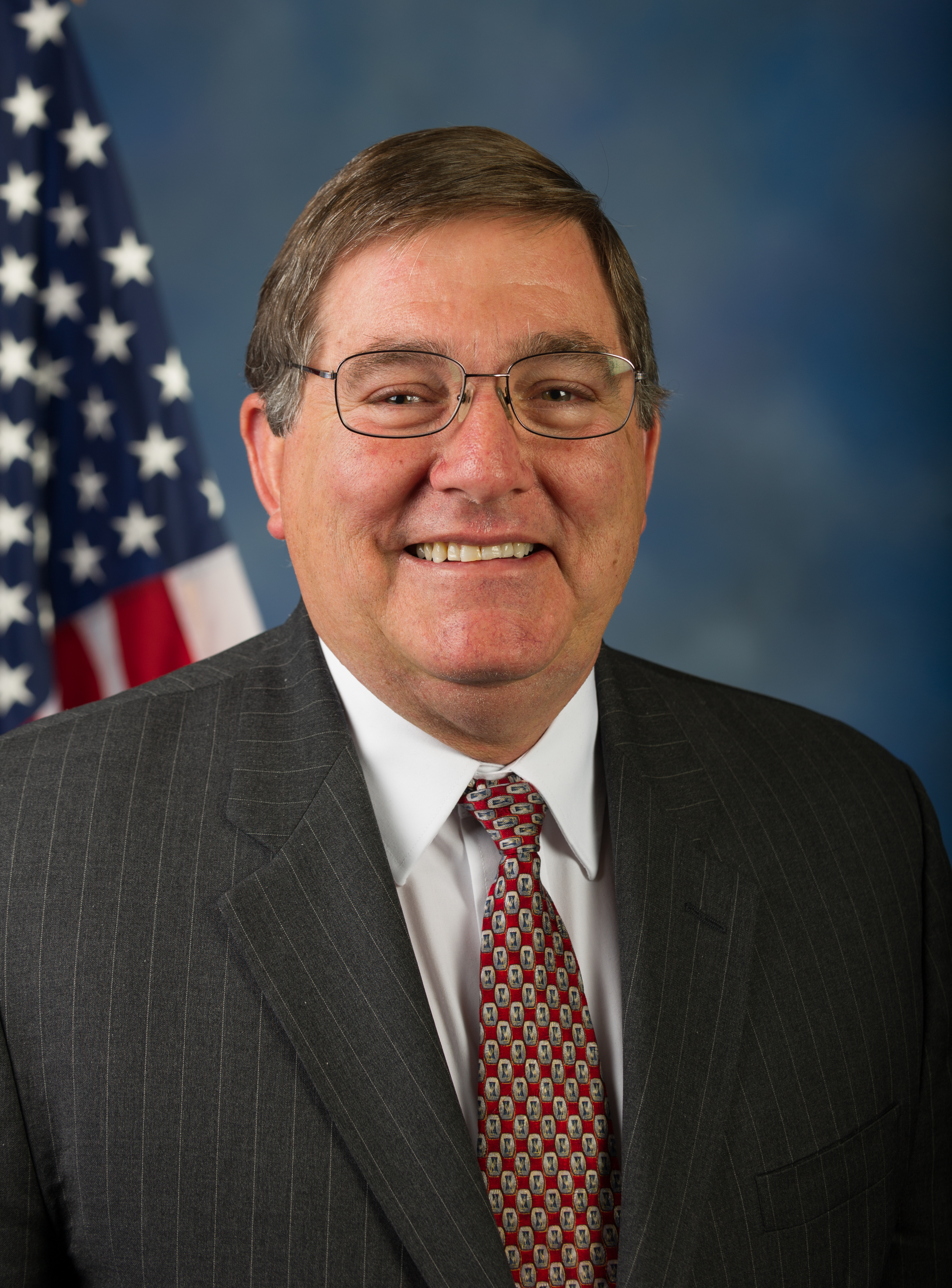

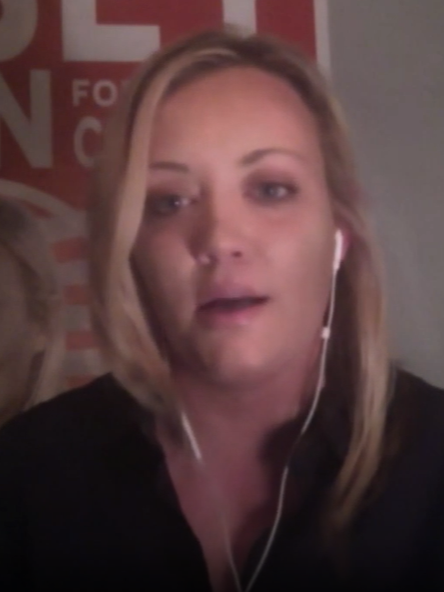
Nominee	Michael C. Burgess	Linsey Fagan
Party	Republican	Democratic
Popular vote	185,551	121,938
Percentage	59.4%	39.0%
- County results Burgess: 50–60% 60–70%
U.S. Representative before election
Michael C. Burgess
Republican
Elected U.S. Representative
Michael C. Burgess
Republican

The 26th district is centered on the northern Dallas–Fort Worth suburbs, including Denton, Keller, and Lewisville. Incumbent Republican Michael C. Burgess, who had represented the district since 2003, ran for re-election. He was re-elected with 66.4% of the vote in 2016. The district had a PVI of R+18.

=== Republican primary ===
==== Candidates ====
===== Nominee =====
- Michael C. Burgess, incumbent U.S. representative

===== Eliminated in primary =====
- Veronica Birkenstock, small business owner

==== Endorsements ====
Michael Burgess

Newspapers

- Dallas Morning News

==== Results ====
Republican primary results
Party	Candidate	Votes	%
Republican	Michael C. Burgess (incumbent)	42,290	76.9
Republican	Veronica Birkenstock	12,684	23.1
Total votes		54,974	100.0

=== Democratic primary ===
==== Candidates ====
===== Nominee =====
- Linsey Fagan, activist

===== Eliminated in primary =====
- Will Fisher, attorney

===== Withdrawn =====
- Michael Callaway, former Republican
- John Wannamaker, deacon

==== Endorsements ====
Linsey Fagan

Organizations

- Brand New Congress
- Justice Democrats
Will Fisher

Newspapers

- Dallas Morning News

==== Results ====
Democratic primary results
Party	Candidate	Votes	%
Democratic	Linsey Fagan	13,817	52.7
Democratic	Will Fisher	12,402	47.3
Total votes		26,219	100.0

=== Libertarian primary ===
==== Candidates ====
===== Nominee =====
- Mark Boler, nominee for this seat in 2012, 2014 & 2016

=== General election ===
==== Predictions ====
Source	Ranking	As of
The Cook Political Report	Safe R	November 5, 2018
Inside Elections	Safe R	November 5, 2018
Sabato's Crystal Ball	Safe R	November 5, 2018
RCP	Safe R	November 5, 2018
Daily Kos	Safe R	November 5, 2018
538	Safe R	November 7, 2018
CNN	Safe R	October 31, 2018
Politico	Safe R	November 4, 2018

==== Endorsements ====
Michael Burgess (R)

Newspapers

- Dallas Morning News
Linsey Fagan (D)

Labor unions

- AFL-CIO
- International Brotherhood of Boilermakers

Organizations

- Brand New Congress
- Justice Democrats
- Our Revolution

==== Results ====
Texas's 26th congressional district, 2018
Party	Candidate	Votes	%
Republican	Michael C. Burgess (incumbent)	185,551	59.4
Democratic	Linsey Fagan	121,938	39.0
Libertarian	Mark Boler	5,016	1.6
Total votes		312,505	100.0
Republican hold			

== District 27 ==
2018 Texas's 27th congressional district election
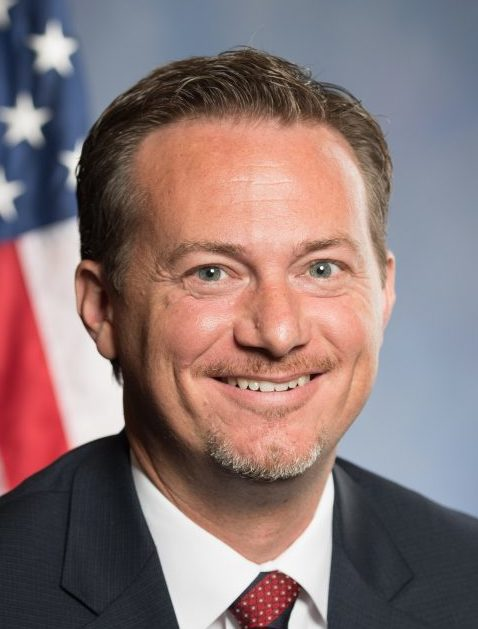

Nominee	Michael Cloud	Eric Holguin
Party	Republican	Democratic
Popular vote	125,118	75,929
Percentage	60.3%	36.6%
- County results Cloud: 40–50% 50–60% 60–70% 70–80% 80–90%
U.S. Representative before election
Michael Cloud
Republican
Elected U.S. Representative
Michael Cloud
Republican

The 27th district is located in the Coastal Bend, anchored by Corpus Christi, and the surrounding areas including Port Aransas and Victoria. The most recent representative was Republican Blake Farenthold, who served from 2011 until April 2018. Farenthold was re-elected with 61.7% of the vote in 2016, and the district's PVI was R+13.

Farenthold retired from Congress and did not run for re-election in 2018. Farenthold resigned on April 6, 2018. Michael Cloud, the Republican nominee for the general election, won a June 30 special election to fill the remainder of the term.

=== Republican primary ===
==== Candidates ====
===== Nominee =====
- Michael Cloud, former Victoria County Republican Party chair

===== Eliminated in primary =====
- Bech Bruun
- Eddie Gassman
- John Grunwald
- Jerry Hall
- Christopher K. Mapp

===== Declined =====
- Blake Farenthold, former U.S. representative

==== Endorsements ====
Michael Cloud

State officials

- Greg Abbott, governor of Texas

Organizations

- Tea Party Express

==== Results ====
Republican primary results
Party	Candidate	Votes	%
Republican	Bech Bruun	15,845	36.1
Republican	Michael Cloud	14,866	33.9
Republican	Christopher K. Mapp	5,302	12.1
Republican	Jerry Hall	3,616	8.2
Republican	John Grunwald	3,038	6.9
Republican	Eddie Gassman	1,226	2.8
Total votes		43,893	100.0

==== Runoff results ====
Republican primary runoff results
Party	Candidate	Votes	%
Republican	Michael Cloud	15,234	61.0
Republican	Bech Bruun	9,723	39.0
Total votes		24,957	100.0

=== Democratic primary ===
==== Candidates ====
===== Nominee =====
- Eric Holguin, former congressional staffer and leading Democratic candidate in this district in the 2018 (special)

===== Eliminated in primary =====
- Raul Barrera, court security officer at Corpus Christi's Federal Courthouse and nominee for this seat in 2016
- Vanessa Edwards Foster
- Ronnie McDonald

==== Results ====
Democratic primary results
Party	Candidate	Votes	%
Democratic	Raul "Roy" Barrera	8,733	41.2
Democratic	Eric Holguin	4,939	23.3
Democratic	Vanessa Edwards Foster	4,041	19.1
Democratic	Ronnie McDonald	3,474	16.4
Total votes		21,187	100.0

==== Runoff results ====
Democratic primary runoff results
Party	Candidate	Votes	%
Democratic	Eric Holguin	6,422	61.9
Democratic	Raul (Roy) Barrera	3,953	38.1
Total votes		10,375	100.0

=== Libertarian primary ===
==== Candidates ====
===== Nominee =====
- Daniel Tinus

=== General election ===
==== Predictions ====
Source	Ranking	As of
The Cook Political Report	Safe R	November 5, 2018
Inside Elections	Safe R	November 5, 2018
Sabato's Crystal Ball	Safe R	November 5, 2018
RCP	Safe R	November 5, 2018
Daily Kos	Safe R	November 5, 2018
538	Safe R	November 7, 2018
CNN	Safe R	October 31, 2018
Politico	Safe R	November 4, 2018

==== Endorsements ====
Michael Cloud (R)

Organizations

- House Freedom Caucus
- Republican Liberty Caucus
Eric Holguin (D)

Labor unions

- International Brotherhood of Boilermakers

Organizations

- Our Revolution

==== Results ====
2018 Texas's 27th congressional district election
Party	Candidate	Votes	%
Republican	Michael Cloud (incumbent)	125,118	60.3
Democratic	Eric Holguin	75,929	36.6
Independent	James Duerr	4,274	2.1
Libertarian	Daniel Tinus	2,100	1.0
Total votes		207,421	100.0
Republican hold			

== District 28 ==
2018 Texas's 28th congressional district election
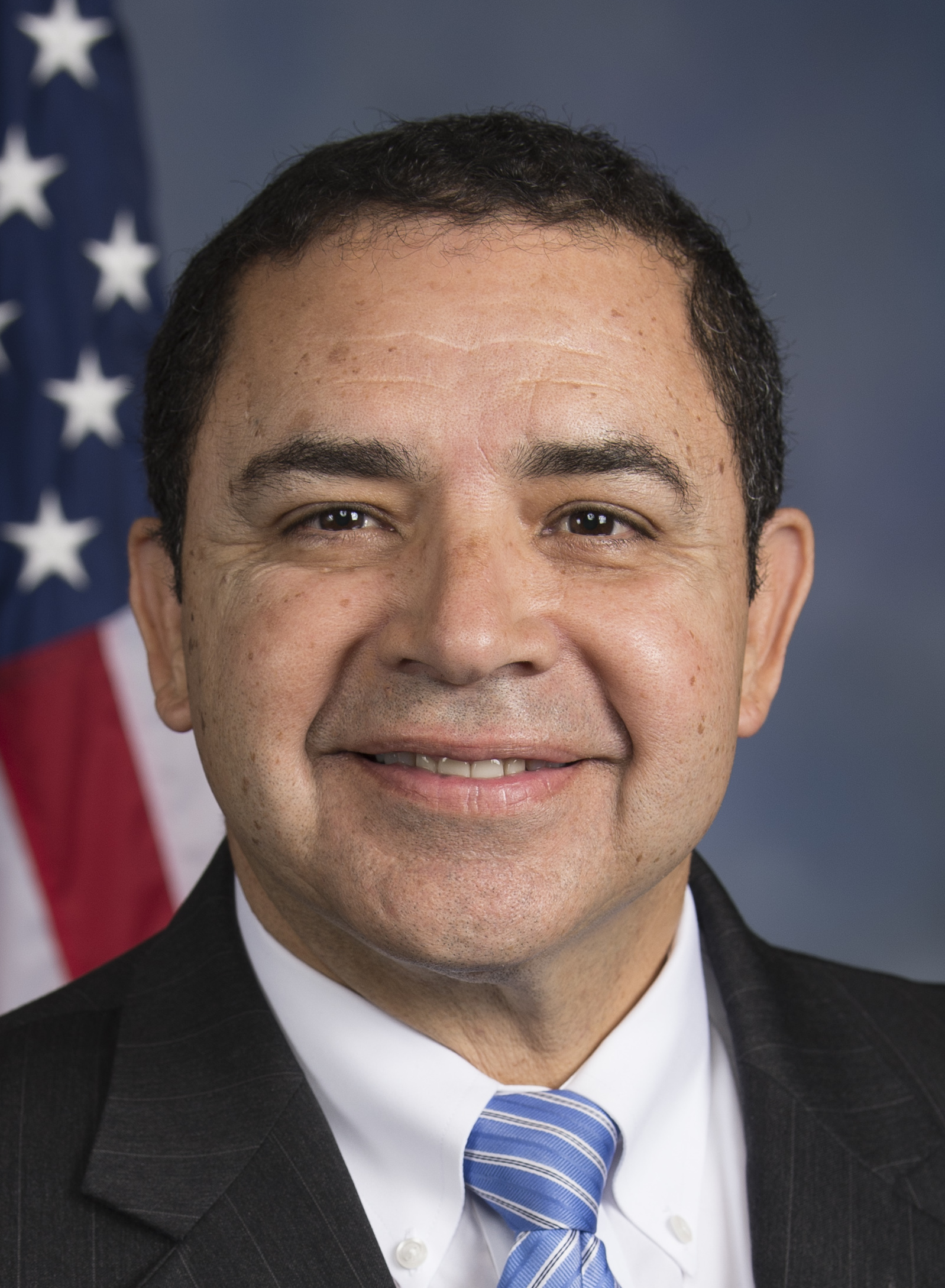

Nominee	Henry Cuellar	Arthur Thomas IV
Party	Democratic	Libertarian
Popular vote	117,494	21,732
Percentage	84.4%	15.6%
- County results Cuellar: 60–70% 70–80% 80–90% >90%
U.S. Representative before election
Henry Cuellar
Democratic
Elected U.S. Representative
Henry Cuellar
Democratic

The 28th district starts in parts of the Rio Grande Valley, including Laredo, Mission and Rio Grande City, and stretches north into the San Antonio suburbs including Converse and Live Oak. Incumbent Democrat Henry Cuellar, who had represented the district since 2005, ran for re-election. He was re-elected with 66.2% of the vote in 2016. The district had a PVI of D+9.

=== Democratic primary ===
==== Candidates ====
===== Nominee =====
- Henry Cuellar, incumbent U.S. representative

==== Endorsements ====
Henry Cuellar

Organizations

- Blue Dog Coalition
- New Democrat Coalition

==== Results ====
Democratic primary results
Party	Candidate	Votes	%
Democratic	Henry Cuellar (incumbent)	39,221	100.0
Total votes		39,221	100.0

=== Libertarian primary ===
==== Candidates ====
===== Nominee =====
- Arthur M. Thomas IV

=== General election ===
==== Predictions ====
Source	Ranking	As of
The Cook Political Report	Safe D	November 5, 2018
Inside Elections	Safe D	November 5, 2018
Sabato's Crystal Ball	Safe D	November 5, 2018
RCP	Safe D	November 5, 2018
Daily Kos	Safe D	November 5, 2018
538	Safe D	November 7, 2018
CNN	Safe D	October 31, 2018
Politico	Safe D	November 4, 2018

==== Endorsements ====
Henry Cuellar (D)

Organizations

- BIPAC
- Blue Dog Coalition
- New Democrat Coalition

==== Results ====
Texas's 28th congressional district, 2018
Party	Candidate	Votes	%
Democratic	Henry Cuellar (incumbent)	117,494	84.4
Libertarian	Arthur Thomas IV	21,732	15.6
Total votes		139,226	100.0
Democratic hold			

== District 29 ==
2018 Texas's 29th congressional district election
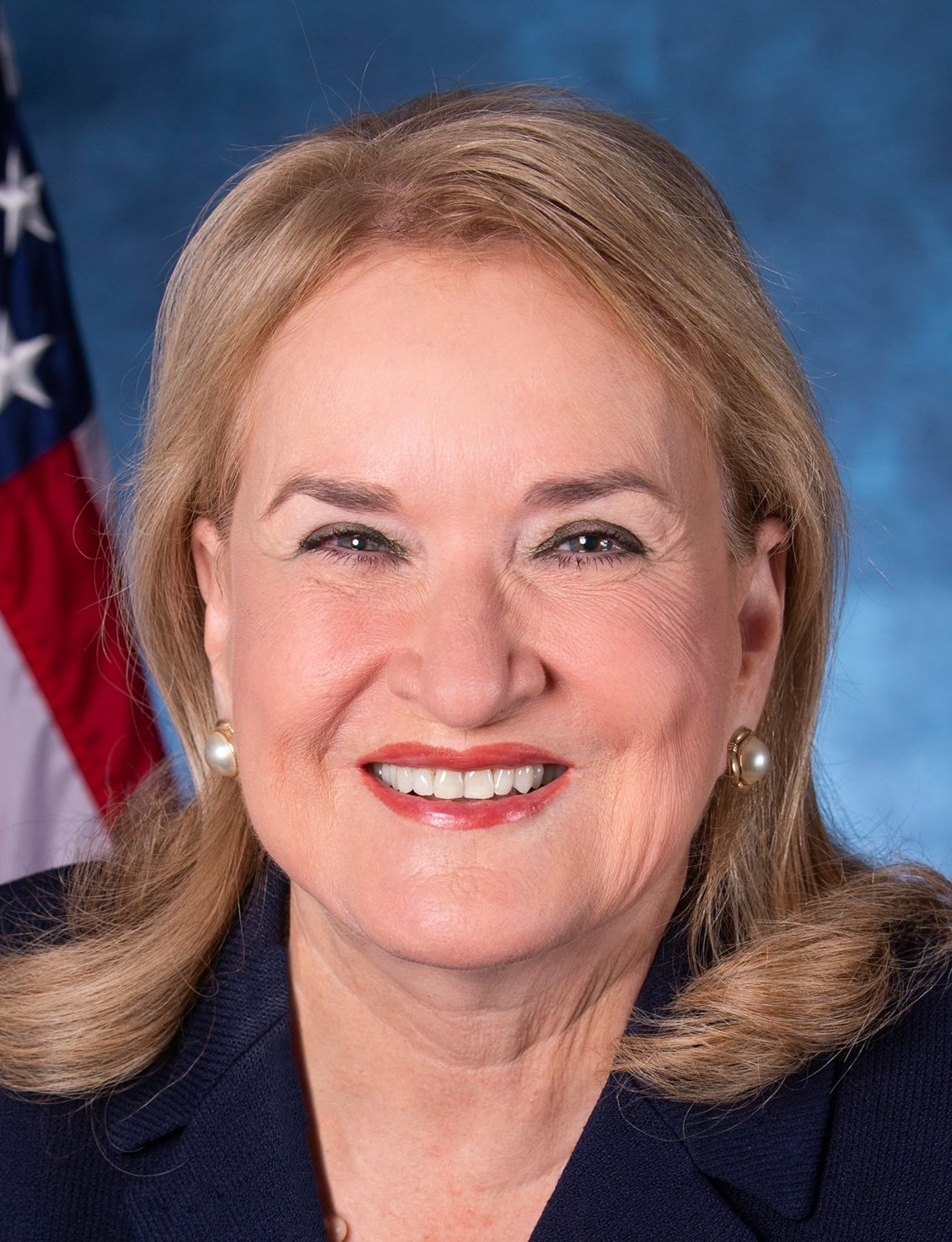

Nominee	Sylvia Garcia	Phillip Arnold Aronoff
Party	Democratic	Republican
Popular vote	88,188	28,098
Percentage	75.1%	23.9%
- County results Garcia: 70–80%
U.S. Representative before election
Gene Green
Democratic
Elected U.S. Representative
Sylvia Garcia
Democratic

The 29th district is anchored by parts of Houston and the surrounding suburbs, including Pasadena and South Houston. Incumbent Democrat Gene Green, who had represented the district since 1993, announced in November 2017 that he would not run for re-election in 2018. He was re-elected with 72.5% of the vote in 2016. The district had a PVI of D+19.

=== Democratic primary ===
==== Candidates ====
===== Nominee =====
- Sylvia Garcia, member of the Texas Senate for the 6th district

===== Eliminated in primary =====
- Dominique Michelle Garcia
- Roel Garcia
- Tahir Javed
- Hector Morales, schoolteacher
- Augustine H. Reyes
- Pedro Valencia
- Armando Walle, member of the Texas House of Representatives for the 140th district

===== Declined =====
- Gene Green, incumbent U.S. representative

==== Endorsements ====
Sylvia Garcia

Labor unions

- AFL-CIO

Newspapers

- Houston Chronicle

==== Results ====
Democratic primary results
Party	Candidate	Votes	%
Democratic	Sylvia Garcia	11,659	63.2
Democratic	Tahir Javed	3,817	20.7
Democratic	Roel Garcia	1,217	6.6
Democratic	Hector Morales	562	3.0
Democratic	Augustine H. Reyes	524	2.8
Democratic	Dominique Michelle Garcia	472	2.6
Democratic	Pedro Valencia	192	1.1
Total votes		18,443	100.0

=== Republican primary ===
==== Candidates ====
===== Nominee =====
- Phillip Aronoff

===== Eliminated in primary =====
- Jaimy Z. Blanco
- Carmen María Montiel, journalist, writer, activist and Miss Venezuela titleholder for 1984
- Robert Schafranek, businessman

===== Withdrawn =====
- Adrian Garcia, former sheriff of Harris County

==== Endorsements ====
Phillip Aronoff

Newspapers

- Houston Chronicle

==== Results ====
Republican primary results
Party	Candidate	Votes	%
Republican	Phillip Aronoff	2,402	38.6
Republican	Carmen María Montiel	1,467	23.6
Republican	Jaimy Z. Blanco	1,309	21.0
Republican	Robert Schafranek	1,042	16.8
Total votes		6,220	100.0

==== Runoff results ====
Republican primary runoff results
Party	Candidate	Votes	%
Republican	Phillip Aronoff	1,151	51.9
Republican	Carmen María Montiel	1,068	48.1
Total votes		2,219	100.0

=== Libertarian primary ===
==== Candidates ====
===== Nominee =====
- Cullen Burns

===== Eliminated in primary =====
- Ruben Perez
- Richard Saettone

=== General election ===
==== Predictions ====
Source	Ranking	As of
The Cook Political Report	Safe D	November 5, 2018
Inside Elections	Safe D	November 5, 2018
Sabato's Crystal Ball	Safe D	November 5, 2018
RCP	Safe D	November 5, 2018
Daily Kos	Safe D	November 5, 2018
538	Safe D	November 7, 2018
CNN	Safe D	October 31, 2018
Politico	Safe D	November 4, 2018

==== Endorsements ====
Sylvia Garcia (D)

Labor unions

- AFL-CIO
- International Brotherhood of Boilermakers

Organizations

- Congressional Progressive Caucus
- EMILY's List
- End Citizens United

Newspapers

- Houston Chronicle

==== Results ====
Texas's 29th congressional district, 2018
Party	Candidate	Votes	%
Democratic	Sylvia Garcia	88,188	75.1
Republican	Phillip Aronoff	28,098	23.9
Libertarian	Cullen Burns	1,199	1.0
Independent	Johnathan Garza (write-in)	9	0.0
Total votes		117,494	100
Democratic hold			

== District 30 ==
2018 Texas's 30th congressional district election
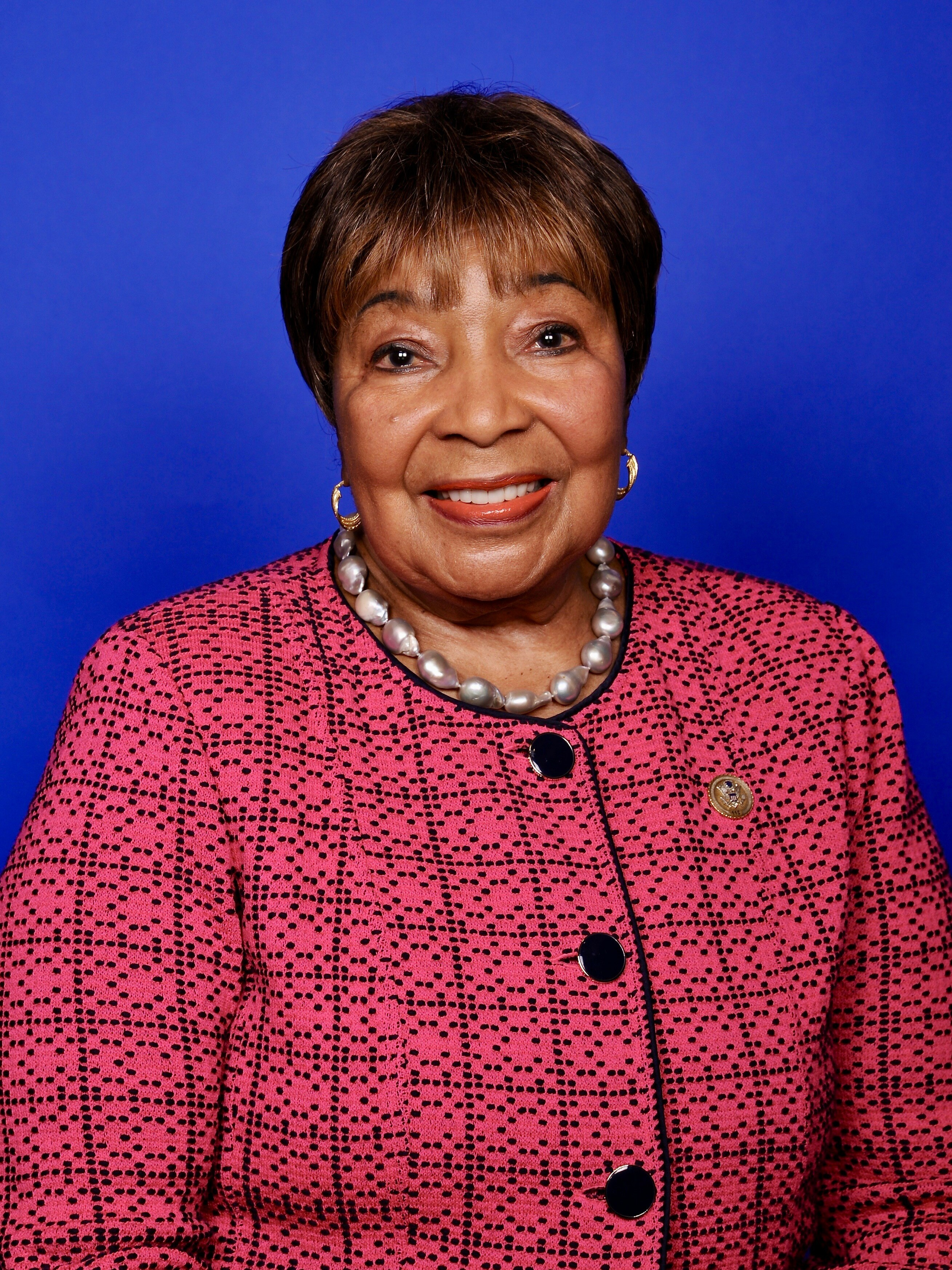

Nominee	Eddie Bernice Johnson	Shawn Jones
Party	Democratic	Libertarian
Popular vote	166,784	16,390
Percentage	91.1%	8.9%
- County results Johnson: 90–100%
U.S. Representative before election
Eddie Bernice Johnson
Democratic
Elected U.S. Representative
Eddie Bernice Johnson
Democratic

The 30th district is centered around Dallas and its surrounding suburbs, including Cedar Hill and Lancaster. Incumbent Democrat Eddie Bernice Johnson, who had represented the district since 1993, ran for re-election. She was re-elected with 77.9% of the vote in 2016. The district had a PVI of D+29.

=== Democratic primary ===
==== Candidates ====
===== Nominee =====
- Eddie Bernice Johnson, incumbent U.S. representative

===== Eliminated in primary =====
- Barbara Mallory Caraway, former state representative and candidate for this seat in 2012, 2014 and 2016
- Eric Williams

==== Endorsements ====
Eddie Bernice Johnson

Labor unions

- AFL-CIO

Newspapers

- Dallas Morning News

==== Results ====
Democratic primary results
Party	Candidate	Votes	%
Democratic	Eddie Bernice Johnson (incumbent)	32,415	63.6
Democratic	Barbara Mallory Caraway	11,641	22.8
Democratic	Eric Williams	6,931	13.6
Total votes		50,987	100.0

=== Libertarian primary ===
==== Candidates ====
===== Nominee =====
- Shawn Jones

=== General election ===
==== Predictions ====
Source	Ranking	As of
The Cook Political Report	Safe D	November 5, 2018
Inside Elections	Safe D	November 5, 2018
Sabato's Crystal Ball	Safe D	November 5, 2018
RCP	Safe D	November 5, 2018
Daily Kos	Safe D	November 5, 2018
538	Safe D	November 7, 2018
CNN	Safe D	October 31, 2018
Politico	Safe D	November 4, 2018

==== Endorsements ====
Eddie Bernice Johnson (D)

Labor unions

- AFL-CIO
- International Brotherhood of Boilermakers

Organizations

- Congressional Progressive Caucus

==== Results ====
Texas's 30th congressional district, 2018
Party	Candidate	Votes	%
Democratic	Eddie Bernice Johnson (incumbent)	166,784	91.1
Libertarian	Shawn Jones	16,390	8.9
Total votes		183,174	100.0
Democratic hold			

== District 31 ==
2018 Texas's 31st congressional district election
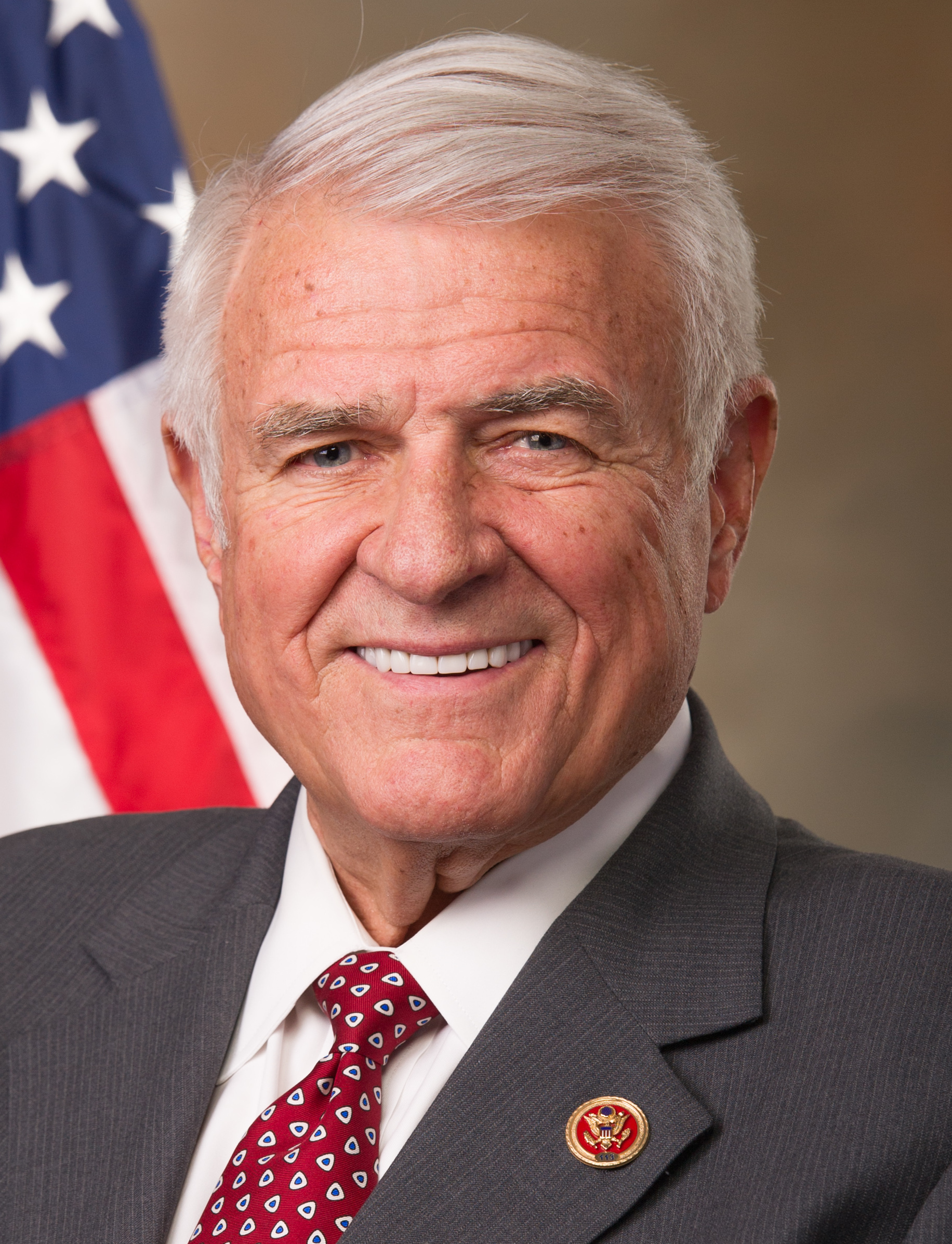

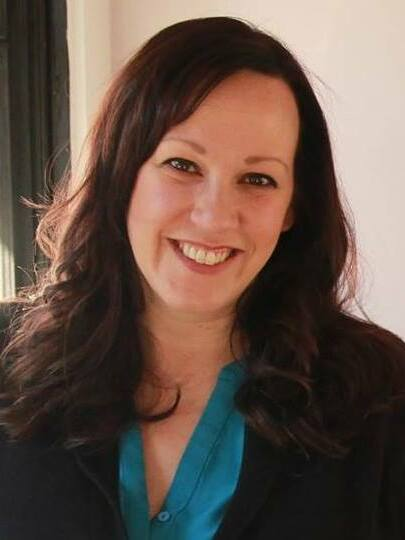
Nominee	John Carter	MJ Hegar
Party	Republican	Democratic
Popular vote	144,680	136,362
Percentage	50.6%	47.7%
- County results Carter: 50–60% Hegar: 40–50%
U.S. Representative before election
John Carter
Republican
Elected U.S. Representative
John Carter
Republican

The 31st district is located in north Austin and the surrounding suburbs including Georgetown and Round Rock. The district also stretches north into Killeen and Temple. Incumbent Republican John Carter, who had represented the district since 2003, ran for re-election. He was re-elected with 58.4% of the vote in 2016. The district had a PVI of R+10.

=== Republican primary ===
==== Candidates ====
===== Nominee =====
- John Carter, incumbent U.S. representative

===== Eliminated in primary =====
- Mike Sweeney, software company founder, member of the Board of the Chisholm Trail Special Utility District and candidate for this seat in 2016

==== Results ====
Republican primary results
Party	Candidate	Votes	%
Republican	John Carter (incumbent)	34,513	65.5
Republican	Mike Sweeney	18,184	34.5
Total votes		52,697	100.0

=== Democratic primary ===
==== Candidates ====
===== Nominee =====
- Mary Jennings "MJ" Hegar, Air Force veteran, writer

===== Eliminated in primary =====
- Mike Clark, geospatial engineer and nominee for this seat in 2016
- Kent Lester, Army veteran and former schoolteacher
- Christine Eady Mann, physician

==== Endorsements ====
MJ Hegar

Labor unions

- AFL-CIO

Newspapers

- The Austin Chronicle (joint with Mann)
Christine Eady Mann

Newspapers

- The Austin Chronicle (joint with Hegar)

==== Results ====
Democratic primary results
Party	Candidate	Votes	%
Democratic	MJ Hegar	13,848	44.9
Democratic	Christine Eady Mann	10,340	33.5
Democratic	Mike Clark	3,465	11.2
Democratic	Kent Lester	3,188	10.3
Total votes		30,841	100.0

==== Runoff results ====
Democratic primary runoff results
Party	Candidate	Votes	%
Democratic	MJ Hegar	8,843	62.2
Democratic	Christine Eady Mann	5,371	37.8
Total votes		14,214	100.0

=== Libertarian primary ===
==== Candidates ====
===== Nominee =====
- Jason Hope

=== General election ===
==== Endorsements ====
John Carter (R)

U.S. representatives

- Henry Cuellar, TX-28 (D)
MJ Hegar (D)

Labor unions

- AFL-CIO
- Communications Workers of America
- International Brotherhood of Boilermakers

Organizations

- Blue Dog Coalition
- Democratic Congressional Campaign Committee "Red to Blue" Program
- EMILY's List
- End Citizens United
- VoteVets
- With Honor Fund

Newspapers

- The Austin Chronicle

==== Predictions ====
Source	Ranking	As of
The Cook Political Report	Likely R	November 5, 2018
Inside Elections	Likely R	November 5, 2018
Sabato's Crystal Ball	Likely R	November 5, 2018
RCP	Safe R	November 5, 2018
Daily Kos	Likely R	November 5, 2018
538	Likely R	November 7, 2018
CNN	Likely R	October 31, 2018
Politico	Likely R	November 4, 2018

==== Polling ====
Poll source	Date(s) administered	Sample size	Margin of error	John Carter (R)	MJ Hegar (D)	Undecided
NYT Upshot/Siena College	October 1–5, 2018	490	± 4.8%	53%	38%	9%
The Tarrance Group (R-Carter)	September 22–25, 2018	400	± 4.9%	54%	33%	–
ALG Research (D-Hegar)	September 16–20, 2018	500	± 4.4%	46%	42%	–
Public Policy Polling (D)	November 28–29, 2017	613	–	46%	40%	14%

==== Results ====
Texas's 31st congressional district, 2018
Party	Candidate	Votes	%
Republican	John Carter (incumbent)	144,680	50.6
Democratic	Mary Jennings Hegar	136,362	47.7
Libertarian	Jason Hope	4,965	1.7
Total votes		286,007	100.0
Republican hold			

== District 32 ==
2018 Texas's 32nd congressional district election
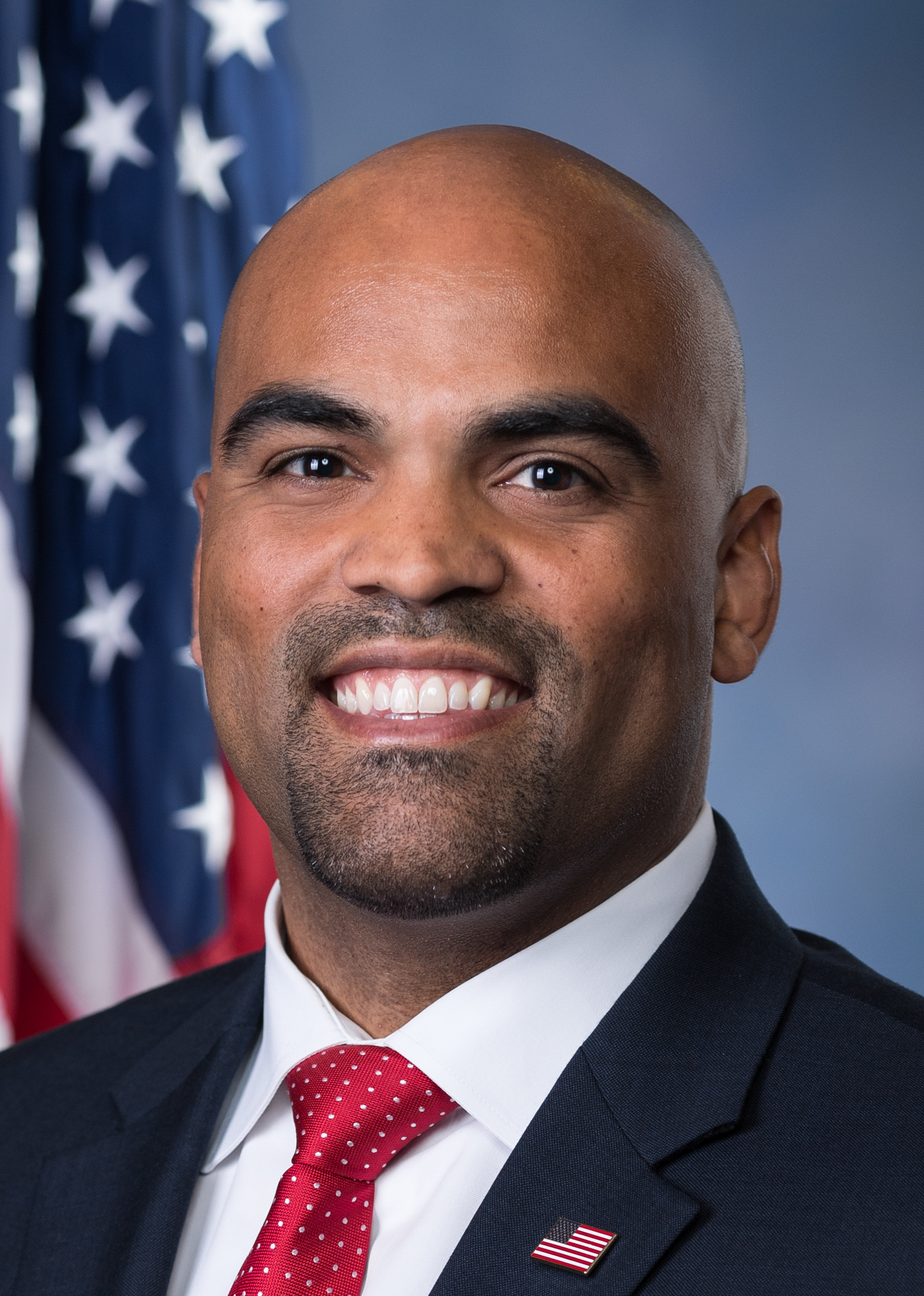

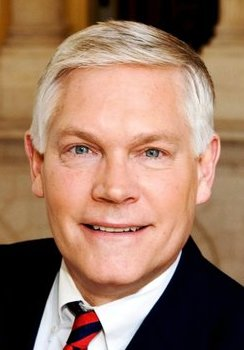
Nominee	Colin Allred	Pete Sessions
Party	Democratic	Republican
Popular vote	144,067	126,101
Percentage	52.3%	45.8%
- County results Allred: 50–60% Sessions: 50–60%
U.S. Representative before election
Pete Sessions
Republican
Elected U.S. Representative
Colin Allred
Democratic

The 32nd district is centered around the northeastern inner Dallas suburbs, including Garland, Richardson, and the Park Cities. Incumbent Republican Pete Sessions, who had represented the district since 1997, ran for re-election. He was re-elected with 71.1% of the vote in 2016. The district had a PVI of R+5.

=== Republican primary ===
==== Candidates ====
===== Nominee =====
- Pete Sessions, incumbent U.S. representative

===== Eliminated in primary =====
- Paul Brown

==== Endorsements ====
Pete Sessions

Newspapers

- Dallas Morning News

==== Results ====
Republican primary results
Party	Candidate	Votes	%
Republican	Pete Sessions (incumbent)	32,784	79.3
Republican	Paul Brown	8,575	20.7
Total votes		41,359	100.0

=== Democratic primary ===
==== Candidates ====
===== Nominee =====
- Colin Allred, civil rights attorney and former NFL player

===== Eliminated in primary =====
- Ronald William Marshall
- Todd Maternowski
- Edward Meier, longtime Democratic operative, executive director of BigThought, former co-executive director of Hillary Clinton's presidential transition team
- George Rodriguez, attorney
- Lillian Salerno, deputy undersecretary for Rural Development at the Department of Agriculture
- Brett Shipp

===== Withdrawn =====
- Danielle Pellett, LGBT activist
- Darrell Rodriguez, former schoolteacher

==== Endorsements ====
Colin Allred

Labor unions

- AFL-CIO (joint with Meier)

Newspapers

- Dallas Morning News
Ed Meier

Labor unions

- AFL-CIO (joint with Allred)

==== Results ====
Democratic primary results
Party	Candidate	Votes	%
Democratic	Colin Allred	15,442	38.5
Democratic	Lillian Salerno	7,343	18.3
Democratic	Brett Shipp	6,550	16.4
Democratic	Ed Meier	5,474	13.7
Democratic	George Rodriguez	3,029	7.5
Democratic	Ron Marshall	1,301	3.2
Democratic	Todd Maternowski	945	2.4
Total votes		40,084	100.0

==== Runoff results ====
The runoff election took place on May 22, 2018.

Democratic primary runoff results
Party	Candidate	Votes	%
Democratic	Colin Allred	15,658	69.5
Democratic	Lillian Salerno	6,874	30.5
Total votes		22,532	100.0

=== Libertarian primary ===
==== Candidates ====
===== Nominee =====
- Melina Baker

=== General election ===
==== Endorsements ====
Pete Sessions (R)

U.S. executive branch officials

- George W. Bush, 43rd president of the United States
- Donald Trump, 45th president of the United States

Organizations

- BIPAC
- NRA Political Victory Fund

Newspapers

- Dallas Morning News
Colin Allred (D)

U.S. executive branch officials

- Barack Obama, 44th president of the United States

Labor unions

- AFL-CIO
- Communications Workers of America
- International Brotherhood of Boilermakers

Organizations

- Democratic Congressional Campaign Committee "Red to Blue" Program
- End Citizens United
- MoveOn
- New Democrat Coalition

==== Polling ====
Poll source	Date(s) administered	Sample size	Margin of error	Pete Sessions (R)	Colin Allred (D)	Melina Baker (L)	Undecided
NYT Upshot/Siena College	October 29 – November 4, 2018	477	± 4.7%	42%	46%	3%	9%
GBA Strategies (D)	September 20–30, 2018	600	± 4.0%	46%	47%	5%	2%
NYT Upshot/Siena College	September 19–24, 2018	500	± 4.8%	48%	47%	–	5%
Public Policy Polling (D)	September 17–18, 2018	555	± 4.2%	42%	47%	–	–
GBA Strategies (D-Allred)	July 30 – August 1, 2018	500	± 4.4%	47%	45%	–	–

Hypothetical polling

Poll source	Date(s) administered	Sample size	Margin of error	Pete Sessions (R)	Democratic opponent (D)	Other	Undecided
Public Policy Polling (D)	November 8–9, 2017	534	± 4.2%	43%	48%	–	9%

==== Predictions ====
Source	Ranking	As of
The Cook Political Report	Tossup	November 5, 2018
Inside Elections	Tossup	November 5, 2018
Sabato's Crystal Ball	Lean D (flip)	November 5, 2018
RCP	Tossup	November 5, 2018
Daily Kos	Tossup	November 5, 2018
538	Lean R	November 7, 2018
CNN	Lean R	October 31, 2018
Politico	Tossup	November 4, 2018

==== Results ====
Texas's 32nd congressional district, 2018
Party	Candidate	Votes	%
Democratic	Colin Allred	144,067	52.3
Republican	Pete Sessions (incumbent)	126,101	45.7
Libertarian	Melina Baker	5,452	2.0
Total votes		275,620	100.0
Democratic gain from Republican			

== District 33 ==
2018 Texas's 33rd congressional district election
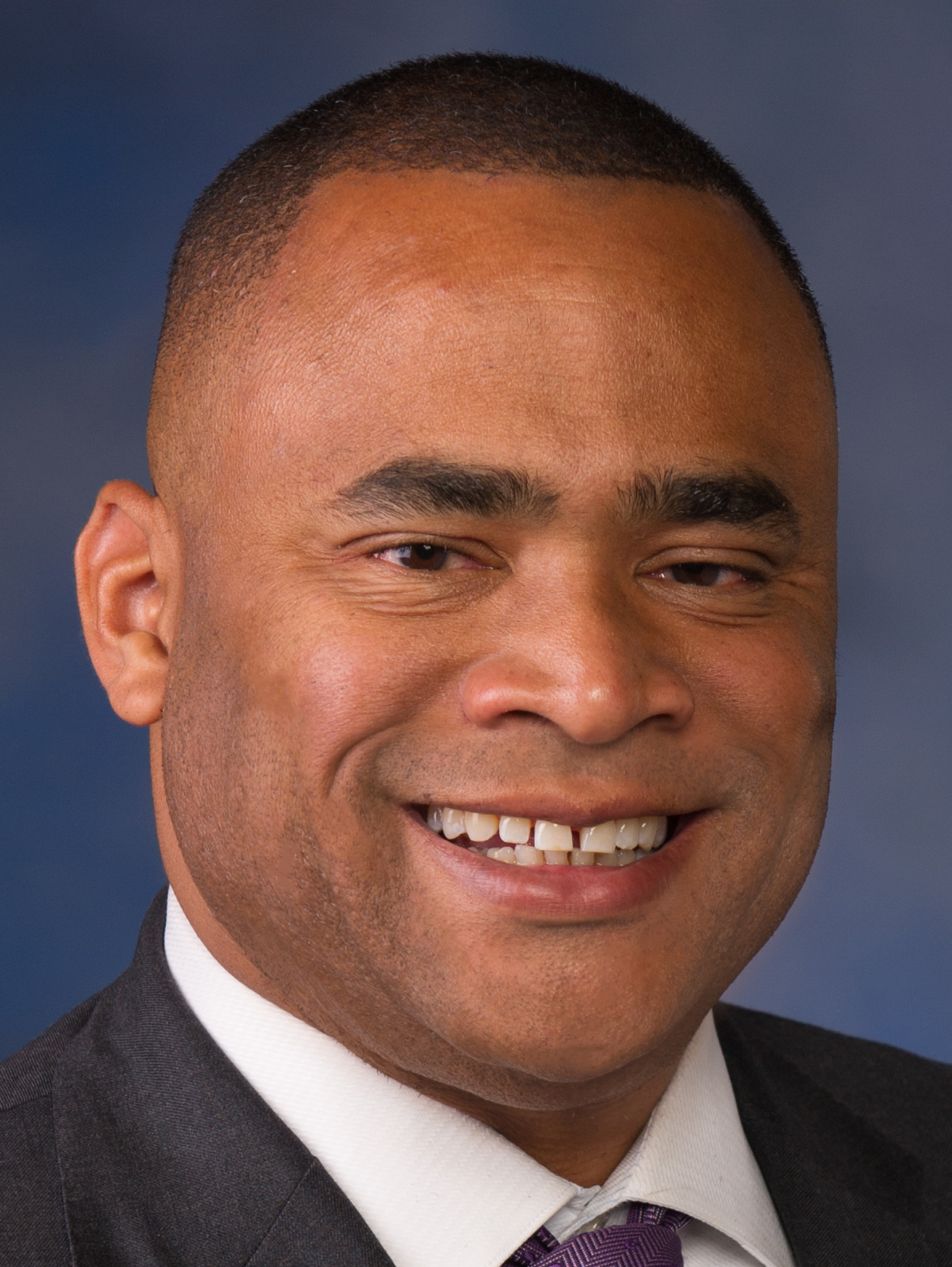

Nominee	Marc Veasey	Willie Billups
Party	Democratic	Republican
Popular vote	90,805	26,120
Percentage	76.2%	21.9%
- County results Veasey: 70–80%
U.S. Representative before election
Marc Veasey
Democratic
Elected U.S. Representative
Marc Veasey
Democratic

The 33rd district is located in the Dallas–Fort Worth metroplex, taking in parts of Arlington, Dallas, Fort Worth, and Irving, as well as the surrounding areas, including Forest Hill and Grand Prairie. Incumbent Democrat Marc Veasey, who had represented the district since 2013, ran for re-election. He was re-elected with 73.7% of the vote in 2016. The district had a PVI of D+23.

=== Democratic primary ===
==== Candidates ====
===== Nominee =====
- Marc Veasey, incumbent U.S. representative

===== Eliminated in primary =====
- Carlos Quintanilla

==== Endorsements ====
Marc Veasey

Labor unions

- AFL-CIO

Organizations

- New Democrat Coalition

Newspapers

- Dallas Morning News

==== Results ====
Democratic primary results
Party	Candidate	Votes	%
Democratic	Marc Veasey (incumbent)	14,998	70.6
Democratic	Carlos Quintanilla	6,233	29.7
Total votes		21,231	100.0

=== Republican primary ===
==== Candidates ====
===== Nominee =====
- Willie Billups

==== Results ====
Republican primary results
Party	Candidate	Votes	%
Republican	Willie Billups	5,254	100.0
Total votes		5,254	100.0

=== Libertarian primary ===
==== Candidates ====
===== Nominee =====
- Jason Reeves

=== General election ===
==== Predictions ====
Source	Ranking	As of
The Cook Political Report	Safe D	November 5, 2018
Inside Elections	Safe D	November 5, 2018
Sabato's Crystal Ball	Safe D	November 5, 2018
RCP	Safe D	November 5, 2018
Daily Kos	Safe D	November 5, 2018
538	Safe D	November 7, 2018
CNN	Safe D	October 31, 2018
Politico	Safe D	November 4, 2018

==== Endorsements ====
Marc Veasey (D)

Labor unions

- AFL-CIO
- Communications Workers of America
- International Brotherhood of Boilermakers

Organizations

- New Democrat Coalition

Newspapers

- Dallas Morning News

==== Results ====
Texas's 33rd congressional district, 2018
Party	Candidate	Votes	%
Democratic	Marc Veasey (incumbent)	90,805	76.2
Republican	Willie Billups	26,120	21.9
Libertarian	Jason Reeves	2,299	1.9
Total votes		119,224	100.0
Democratic hold			

== District 34 ==
2018 Texas's 34th congressional district election
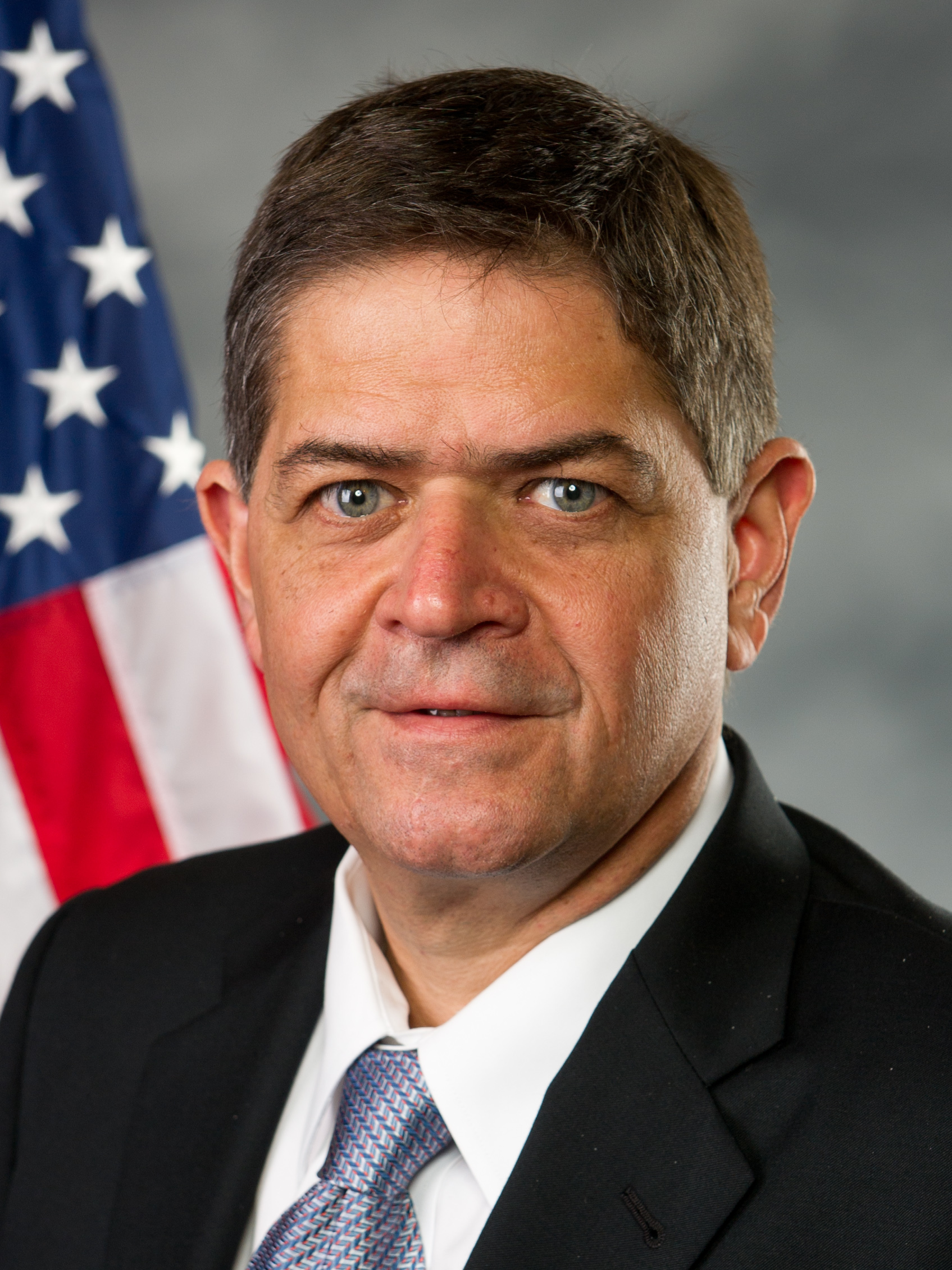

Nominee	Filemon Vela Jr.	Rey Gonzalez
Party	Democratic	Republican
Popular vote	85,825	57,243
Percentage	60.0%	40.0%
- County results Vela: 50–60% 60–70% 70–80% Gonzalez: 50–60% 70–80% 80–90%
U.S. Representative before election
Filemon Vela Jr.
Democratic
Elected U.S. Representative
Filemon Vela Jr.
Democratic

The 34th district is centered around the Rio Grande Valley, including Brownsville, Harlingen, and Weslaco. Incumbent Democrat Filemon Vela Jr., who had represented the district since 2013, ran for re-election. He was re-elected with 62.7% of the vote in 2016. The district had a PVI of D+10.

=== Democratic primary ===
==== Candidates ====
===== Nominee =====
- Filemon Vela Jr., incumbent U.S. representative

==== Endorsements ====
Filemon Vela Jr.

Labor unions

- AFL-CIO
- Communications Workers of America
- International Brotherhood of Boilermakers

Organizations

- Blue Dog Coalition

==== Results ====
Democratic primary results
Party	Candidate	Votes	%
Democratic	Filemon Vela Jr. (incumbent)	25,344	100.0
Total votes		25,344	100.0

=== Republican primary ===
==== Candidates ====
===== Nominee =====
- Rey Gonzalez

==== Results ====
Republican primary results
Party	Candidate	Votes	%
Republican	Rey Gonzalez	10,227	100.0
Total votes		10,227	100.0

=== General election ===
==== Predictions ====
Source	Ranking	As of
The Cook Political Report	Safe D	November 5, 2018
Inside Elections	Safe D	November 5, 2018
Sabato's Crystal Ball	Safe D	November 5, 2018
RCP	Safe D	November 5, 2018
Daily Kos	Safe D	November 5, 2018
538	Safe D	November 7, 2018
CNN	Safe D	October 31, 2018
Politico	Safe D	November 4, 2018

==== Endorsements ====
Filemon Vela Jr. (D)

Labor unions

- AFL-CIO

Organizations

- Blue Dog Coalition

==== Results ====
Texas's 34th congressional district, 2018
Party	Candidate	Votes	%
Democratic	Filemon Vela Jr. (incumbent)	85,825	60.0
Republican	Rey Gonzalez	57,243	40.0
Total votes		143,068	100.0
Democratic hold			

== District 35 ==
2018 Texas's 35th congressional district election
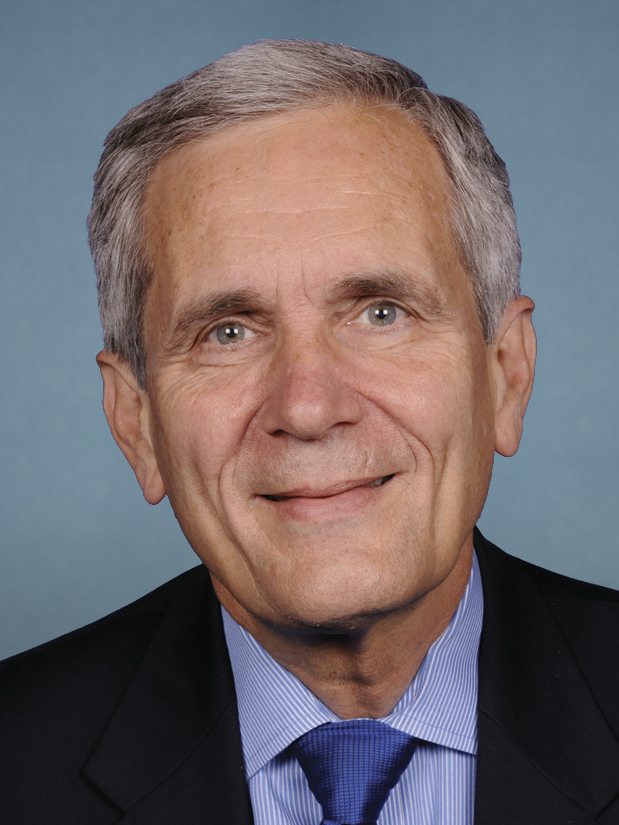

Nominee	Lloyd Doggett	David Smalling
Party	Democratic	Republican
Popular vote	138,278	50,553
Percentage	71.3%	26.0%
- County results Doggett: 50–60% 60–70% 70–80% 80–90% Smalling: 50–60%
U.S. Representative before election
Lloyd Doggett
Democratic
Elected U.S. Representative
Lloyd Doggett
Democratic

The 35th district stretches from Downtown San Antonio up into Austin metro, including Lockhart, San Marcos, and parts of east Austin. Incumbent Democrat Lloyd Doggett, who had represented the district since 2013 and previously represented both the 10th district and 25th district since 1995, ran for re-election. He was re-elected with 63.1% of the vote in 2016. The district had a PVI of D+15.

In March 2017, a panel of federal judges ruled that the 35th district was illegally drawn with discriminatory intent. In August 2017 there was another ruling that the district was unconstitutional.

=== Democratic primary ===
==== Candidates ====
===== Nominee =====
- Lloyd Doggett, incumbent U.S. representative

==== Endorsements ====
Lloyd Doggett

Labor unions

- AFL-CIO

==== Results ====
Democratic primary results
Party	Candidate	Votes	%
Democratic	Lloyd Doggett (incumbent)	32,101	100.0
Total votes		32,101	100.0

=== Republican primary ===
==== Candidates ====
===== Nominee =====
- David Smalling

===== Eliminated in primary =====
- Sherrill Kenneth Alexander

==== Results ====
Republican primary results
Party	Candidate	Votes	%
Republican	David Smalling	7,083	53.3
Republican	Sherrill Kenneth (SK) Alexander	6,198	46.7
Total votes		13,281	100.0

=== Libertarian primary ===
==== Candidates ====
===== Nominee =====
- Clark Patterson

=== General election ===
==== Predictions ====
Source	Ranking	As of
The Cook Political Report	Safe D	November 5, 2018
Inside Elections	Safe D	November 5, 2018
Sabato's Crystal Ball	Safe D	November 5, 2018
RCP	Safe D	November 5, 2018
Daily Kos	Safe D	November 5, 2018
538	Safe D	November 7, 2018
CNN	Safe D	October 31, 2018
Politico	Safe D	November 4, 2018

==== Endorsements ====
Lloyd Doggett (D)

Labor unions

- AFL-CIO
- Communications Workers of America
- International Brotherhood of Boilermakers

Organizations

- Congressional Progressive Caucus

Newspapers

- The Austin Chronicle

==== Results ====
Texas's 35th congressional district, 2018
Party	Candidate	Votes	%
Democratic	Lloyd Doggett (incumbent)	138,278	71.3
Republican	David Smalling	50,553	26.0
Libertarian	Clark Patterson	5,236	2.7
Total votes		194,067	100
Democratic hold			

== District 36 ==
2018 Texas's 36th congressional district election
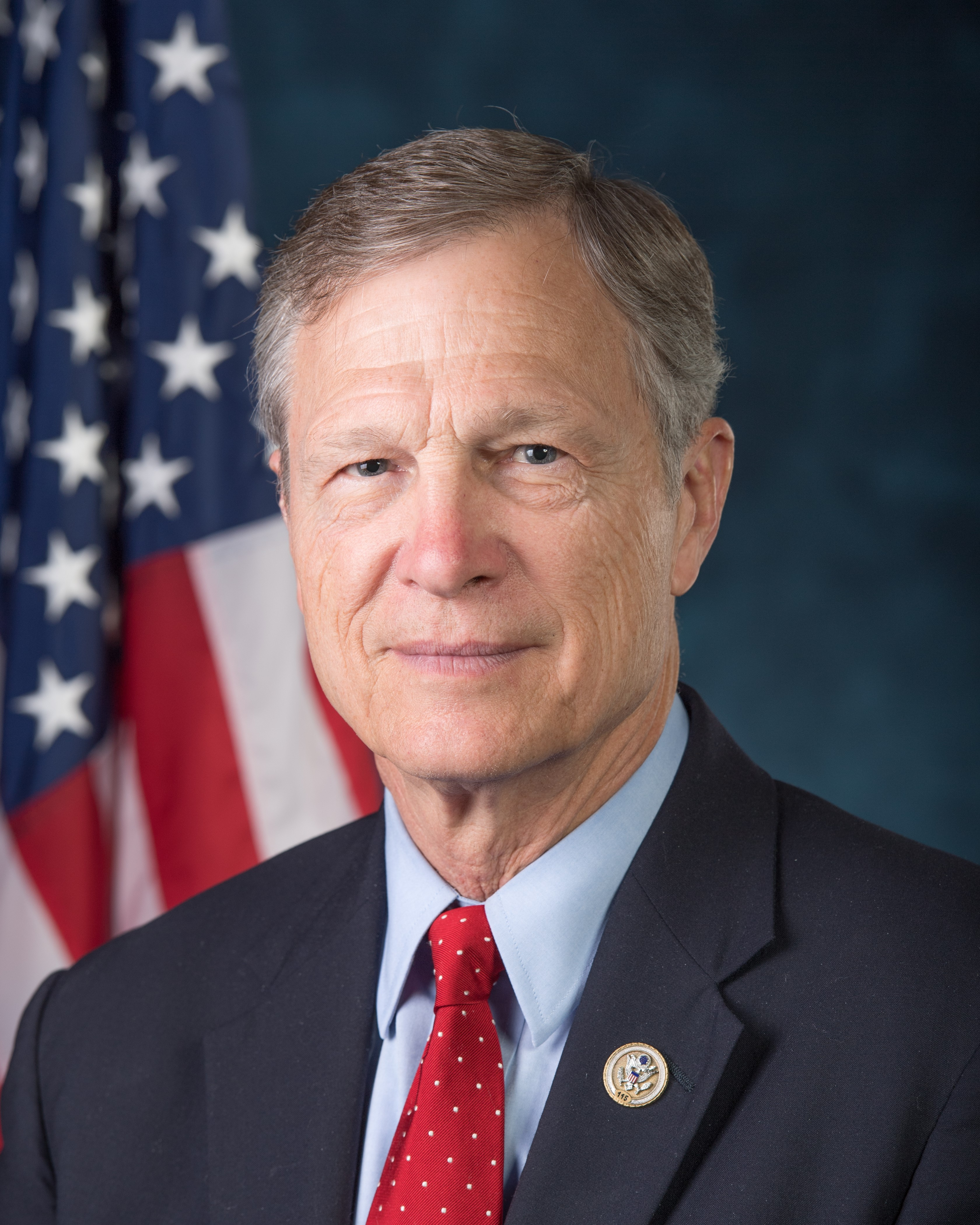

Nominee	Brian Babin	Dayna Steele
Party	Republican	Democratic
Popular vote	161,048	60,908
Percentage	72.6%	27.4%
- County results Babin: 60–70% 70–80% 80–90%
U.S. Representative before election
Brian Babin
Republican
Elected U.S. Representative
Brian Babin
Republican

The 36th district takes in the Bay Area outer suburbs of Houston, including Baytown, Deer Park, and La Porte. The district also includes rural Southeastern Texas, such as Lumberton and Orange. Incumbent Republican Brian Babin, who had represented the district since 2015, ran for re-election. He was re-elected with 88.6% of the vote in 2016. The district had a PVI of R+26.

=== Republican primary ===
==== Candidates ====
===== Nominee =====
- Brian Babin, incumbent U.S. representative

==== Results ====
Republican primary results
Party	Candidate	Votes	%
Republican	Brian Babin (incumbent)	50,317	100.0
Total votes		50,317	100.0

=== Democratic primary ===
==== Candidates ====
===== Nominee =====
- Dayna Steele, radio and television personality

===== Eliminated in primary =====
- Jon Powell, scientist and environmental consultant

==== Endorsements ====
Dayna Steele

Labor unions

- AFL-CIO
- International Brotherhood of Boilermakers

Newspapers

- Houston Chronicle

==== Results ====
Democratic primary results
Party	Candidate	Votes	%
Democratic	Dayna Steele	9,848	72.0
Democratic	Jon Powell	3,827	28.0
Total votes		13,675	100.0

=== Libertarian primary ===
==== Candidates ====
===== Nominee =====
- Robert Appelbaum

=== General election ===
==== Predictions ====
Source	Ranking	As of
The Cook Political Report	Safe R	November 5, 2018
Inside Elections	Safe R	November 5, 2018
Sabato's Crystal Ball	Safe R	November 5, 2018
RCP	Safe R	November 5, 2018
Daily Kos	Safe R	November 5, 2018
538	Safe R	November 7, 2018
CNN	Safe R	October 31, 2018
Politico	Safe R	November 4, 2018

==== Endorsements ====
Dayna Steele (D)

Labor unions

- AFL-CIO

Newspapers

- Houston Chronicle

==== Results ====
Texas's 36th congressional district, 2018
Party	Candidate	Votes	%
Republican	Brian Babin (incumbent)	161,048	72.6
Democratic	Dayna Steele	60,908	27.4
Total votes		221,956	100.0
Republican hold			

== See also ==
- 2018 United States House of Representatives elections
- 2018 United States elections

Official campaign websites
- District 1
  - Louie Gohmert (R) for Congress
  - Shirley McKellar (D) for Congress
- District 2
  - Daniel Crenshaw (R) for Congress
  - Todd Litton (D) for Congress
- District 3
  - Lorie Burch (D) for Congress
  - Van Taylor (R) for Congress
- District 4
  - Catherine Krantz (D) for Congress
  - John Ratcliffe (R) for Congress Archived December 13, 2017, at the Wayback Machine
- District 5
  - Lance Gooden (R) for Congress
  - Dan Wood (D) for Congress
- District 6
  - Jana Lynne Sanchez (D) for Congress
  - Ron Wright (R) for Congress
- District 7
  - John Culberson (R) for Congress
  - Lizzie Pannill Fletcher (D) for Congress
- District 8
  - Kevin Brady (R) for Congress Archived March 9, 2021, at the Wayback Machine
  - Steven David (D) for Congress Archived October 14, 2017, at the Wayback Machine
- District 9
  - Al Green (D) for Congress
- District 10
  - Michael McCaul (R) for Congress
  - Mike Siegel (D) for Congress Archived December 22, 2017, at the Wayback Machine
- District 11
  - Mike Conaway (R) for Congress
  - Jennie Lou Leeder (D) for Congress Archived October 14, 2017, at the Wayback Machine
- District 12
  - Vanessa Adia (D) for Congress Archived October 14, 2017, at the Wayback Machine
  - Kay Granger (R) for Congress
- District 13
  - Greg Sagan (D) for Congress
  - Mac Thornberry (R) for Congress
- District 14
  - Adrienne Bell (D) for Congress
  - Randy Weber (R) for Congress
- District 15
  - Vicente Gonález (D) for Congress
  - Tim Westley (R) for Congress
- District 16
  - Veronica Escobar (D) for Congress
  - Rick Seeberger (R) for Congress
- District 17
  - Bill Flores (R) for Congress
  - Rick Kennedy (D) for Congress
- District 18
  - Sheila Jackson-Lee (D) for Congress
  - Ava Reynero Pate (R) for Congress
- District 19
  - Jodey Arrington (R) for Congress
  - Miguel Levario (D) for Congress
- District 20
  - Joaquín Castro (D) for Congress
- District 21
  - Joseph Kopser (D) for Congress Archived October 14, 2017, at the Wayback Machine
  - Chip Roy (R) for Congress
- District 22
  - Sri Preston Kulkarni (D) for Congress
  - Pete Olson (R) for Congress Archived December 9, 2017, at the Wayback Machine
- District 23
  - Will Hurd (R) for Congress Archived December 23, 2017, at the Wayback Machine
  - Gina Ortiz Jones (D) for Congress Archived May 23, 2019, at the Wayback Machine
- District 24
  - Kenny Marchant (R) for Congress
  - Jan McDowell (D) for Congress
- District 25
  - Julie Oliver (D) for Congress
  - Roger Williams (R) for Congress
- District 26
  - Mark Boler (L) for Congress Archived January 22, 2021, at the Wayback Machine
  - Michael Burgess (R) for Congress
  - Linsey Fagan (D) for Congress
- District 27
  - Michael Cloud (R) for Congress
  - Eric Holguin (D) for Congress
- District 28
  - Henry Cuellar (D) for Congress Archived January 2, 2018, at the Wayback Machine
- District 29
  - Phillip Aronoff (R) for Congress
  - Sylvia Garcia (D) for Congress
- District 30
  - Eddie Bernice Johnson (D) for Congress
- District 31
  - John Carter (R) for Congress
  - MJ Hegar (D) for Congress
- District 32
  - Colin Allred (D) for Congress
  - Pete Sessions (R) for Congress
- District 33
  - Willie Billups (R) for Congress
  - Marc Veasey (D) for Congress
- District 34
  - Rey Gonzalez (R) for Congress
  - Filemon Vela Jr. (D) for Congress
- District 35
  - Lloyd Doggett (D) for Congress
  - David Smalling (R) for Congress
- District 36
  - Brian Babin (R) for Congress
  - Dayna Steele (D) for Congress
