= 2025 Texas redistricting =

Mid-decade change to congressional district boundaries

Map of Texas's congressional districts as passed by the governor of Texas on August 29, 2025, and will be used at the 2026 House elections Interactive map version

Texas congressional districts as redrawn by the Texas Legislature in a 2025 special session. Changes from the previous map highlighted. Territory which has moved to a new district Districts which were entirely unchanged

Between June and August 2025, lawmakers in the U.S. state of Texas considered a process of mid-decade redistricting to give members of the Republican Party in the state an advantage by gerrymandering the state's congressional districts ahead of the 2026 United States House of Representatives elections. In the 2024 elections, Republicans won 25 of the state's House seats and Democrats won the remaining 13, but with the redrawn map, it could potentially give Republicans up to 30 seats.

On August 20, 2025, the Texas State House passed congressional maps that would target five Democratic-held seats, all of them being coalition districts containing a high proportion of minority populations. The vote was 88–52, a party-line vote. The new map aimed to flip the state's 9th, 28th, 32nd, 34th, and 35th districts to Republican control. On August 23, 2025, the Texas State Senate passed the map by a vote of 18–8. It then headed to Governor Greg Abbott, who officially signed the new congressional map into law on August 29, 2025.

The new map was challenged at federal district court, where a temporary injunction was placed blocking the map from use in November 2026. Abbott appealed directly to the United States Supreme Court, which on a 6–3 decision stayed the injunction in December 2025, and formally reversed the lower court's decision and cleared the map to be used for the 2026 elections in April 2026.

== Background ==
Map of Texas's congressional districts since 2023 Interactive map version

In June 2025, The New York Times reported that the Trump administration had urged Republican leadership in the state of Texas to redraw the state's congressional district boundaries in order to benefit Republicans in the 2026 elections. The plan elicited concern from some Texas Republicans, who argued that it could hurt incumbent Republicans. Representative Michael McCaul held a twenty-minute meeting in the United States Capitol to discuss the plan. According to the Times, the proposal began amid concern from Trump and his allies that a Republican loss in the 2026 elections could damage Trump's legislative agenda and lead to investigations. According to The Texas Tribune, Trump's plan was met by skepticism from Governor Greg Abbott; his concerns were alleviated after a call with Trump.

On August 4, 2025, House Speaker Dustin Burrows appointed a new committee for redistricting efforts. The committee was chaired by Representative Cody Vasut, with initial members to include 12 Republicans and nine Democrats.

== Texas Legislature special session ==
=== Hearings and Democratic preparations ===
On July 9, 2025, Abbott called for a special session of the Texas Legislature to discuss redistricting. The impetus for the session was a letter from the United States Department of Justice giving the Texas Legislature the legal authority to redistrict its legislative boundaries, citing discrimination in four majority-minority congressional districts; the letter led to Abbott acknowledging that some districts were drawn "along strict racial lines", a reversal in the state's prior stance. The Texas Legislature's Republican majority gave Democrats limited options to contest the effort. U.S. House Minority Leader Hakeem Jeffries and Democratic National Committee Chairman Ken Martin held a call on July 14 to discuss a response to the redistricting proposal, including the possibility of walking out of the session. The following day, Trump held his own call with Texas Republicans, urging them to give the state five additional Republican seats.

The special session began on July 21. At a press conference, state Democrats vowed to prolong the redistricting effort as much as possible through several means, including the filibuster, delaying hearings, and walking out. At the first of at least seven House redistricting committee hearings three days later, criticism mounted from some constituents and Democrats, who focused on the lack of publicly available maps. At a hearing at the University of Houston, Committee Chairman Cody Vasut stated that additional hearings would be scheduled after maps were filed. Concurrently, Texas Democrats began fundraising in preparation to leave the state; a rules change approved two years prior, after Democrats had broken quorum to attempt to stop an election law from getting passed, imposes a US$500 fine per day and the possibility of arrest on lawmakers who break quorum, though lawmakers cannot use campaign funds to pay for the fines. U.S. Representative Jasmine Crockett stated that she was willing to fund the walkout. Fundraising involved establishing a US$20 million fund, the Lone Star Fund, and a US$2 million advertisement campaign. Several Texas House Democrats traveled to California, Illinois, and New Mexico to meet with Governors Gavin Newsom, JB Pritzker, and Michelle Lujan Grisham, respectively.

=== Walkout and Abbott's threats ===
Massachusetts Governor Maura Healey and Mass. Sec. of the Commonwealth William F. Galvin meet with several Texas Democratic lawmakers at the Massachusetts State House on August 5, 2025, during the walkout.

Texas Republicans defended the map in a meeting on August 1 amid protests in the Texas State Capitol. The following day, the Texas House Select Committee on Congressional Redistricting advanced the redrawn congressional map. On August 3, most House Democrats left the state, denying Republicans a quorum to vote on the map. Democrats said the walkout was intended to delay the redistricting effort and draw national attention to the proposal. A majority left that afternoon to head to Chicago, while some traveled to New York to meet with Governor Kathy Hochul and others convened at the National Conference of State Legislatures with some Senate Democrats. In response, Abbott ordered Democrats to return to the Capitol by August 4, threatening to remove them from office through a process outlined in a non-binding legal opinion by Attorney General Ken Paxton and warning of bribery charges for fundraising to pay for a US$500 per day fine. Abbott stated that he would move to extradite "any potential out-of-state felons", while Pritzker said he would protect the lawmakers in his state. Although Abbott cannot legally seek extradition for lawmakers who break quorum, Paxton may file quo warranto petitions to remove them from office, anytime intensive process that could trigger multiple special elections. Alternatively, he could file bribery charges against the lawmakers.

On August 4, 2025, the Texas House voted 85–6 to issue arrest warrants for the Democratic House members who left Texas. All of the no votes on the warrants were Democrats.

Senator John Cornyn stated that the FBI had agreed to help "find" the Democratic lawmakers.

On August 18, after the special session had expired, and following California's gerrymandering proposal to counter Republican gains in Texas, most of the Texas Democrats returned to the state. Abbott had already called for another special session, which started that day. The Democrats who returned were told that they could not leave the state without written permission from the Republican house speaker, and each was given a permission form to sign, agreeing to be escorted by a Texas public safety officer at all times. Representative Nicole Collier refused to sign the form and was then prevented from leaving the House floor that evening, at which point she filed a habeas corpus petition in court, challenging the legality of locking her inside. Abbott and Paxton also petitioned the Texas Supreme Court to remove the Democrats who fled from office.

== Partisan breakdown of the new congressional map ==
| District | Incumbent | 2024 U.S. presidential result | | Notional outcome | 2026 result |
| District | Incumbent | 2022 map | New map | Notional outcome | 2026 result |
|---|---|---|---|---|---|
| 1st district | Nathaniel Moran (R) | +51.19% | +49.46% | Rep. hold | Rep. hold |
| 2nd district | Dan Crenshaw (R) | +23.77% | +22.83% | Rep. hold | Rep. hold |
| 3rd district | Keith Self (R) | +19.98% | +23.34% | Rep. hold | Rep. hold |
| 4th district | Pat Fallon (R) | +32.48% | +24.63% | Rep. hold | Rep. hold |
| 5th district | Lance Gooden (R) | +27.01% | +21.55% | Rep. hold | Rep. hold |
| 6th district | Jake Ellzey (R) | +28.45% | +22.87% | Rep. hold | Rep. hold |
| 7th district | Lizzie Fletcher (D) | –20.73% | –23.42% | Dem. hold | Dem. hold |
| 8th district | Morgan Luttrell (R) | +33.87% | +27.63% | Rep. hold | Rep. hold |
| 9th district | Al Green (D) | –44.05% | +19.88% | Rep. gain | Dem. hold |
| 10th district | Michael McCaul (R) | +24.76% | +22.56% | Rep. hold | Rep. hold |
| 11th district | August Pfluger (R) | +45.38% | +34.30% | Rep. hold | Rep. hold |
| 12th district | Craig Goldman (R) | +22.58% | +23.87% | Rep. hold | Rep. hold |
| 13th district | Ronny Jackson (R) | +47.73% | +46.16% | Rep. hold | Rep. hold |
| 14th district | Randy Weber (R) | +34.02% | +24.27% | Rep. hold | Rep. hold |
| 15th district | Monica De La Cruz (R) | +17.84% | +17.86% | Rep. hold | Dem. gain |
| 16th district | Veronica Escobar (D) | –15.97% | –16.38% | Dem. hold | Dem. hold |
| 17th district | Pete Sessions (R) | +29.20% | +21.59% | Rep. hold | Rep. hold |
| 18th district | Christian Menefee (D) | –39.77% | –54.90% | Dem. hold | Dem. hold |
| 19th district | Jodey Arrington (R) | +51.66% | +51.66% | Rep. hold | Rep. hold |
| 20th district | Joaquin Castro (D) | −21.21% | −28.44% | Dem. hold | Dem. hold |
| 21st district | Chip Roy (R) | +23.58% | +21.81% | Rep. hold | Rep. hold |
| 22nd district | Troy Nehls (R) | +19.48% | +22.14% | Rep. hold | Rep. hold |
| 23rd district | Vacant | +15.50% | +14.79% | Rep. hold | Dem. gain |
| 24th district | Beth Van Duyne (R) | +15.47% | +16.08% | Rep. hold | Rep. hold |
| 25th district | Roger Williams (R) | +36.30% | +24.06% | Rep. hold | Rep. hold |
| 26th district | Brandon Gill (R) | +23.41% | +23.79% | Rep. hold | Rep. hold |
| 27th district | Michael Cloud (R) | +29.63% | +21.17% | Rep. hold | Rep. hold |
| 28th district | Henry Cuellar (D) | +7.27% | +10.37% | Rep. gain | Dem. hold |
| 29th district | Sylvia Garcia (D) | –20.39% | –30.42% | Dem. hold | Dem. hold |
| 30th district | Jasmine Crockett (D) | –46.80% | –47.03% | Dem. hold | Dem. hold |
| 31st district | John Carter (R) | +23.18% | +21.80% | Rep. hold | Rep. hold |
| 32nd district | Julie Johnson (D) | –23.61% | +17.71% | Rep. gain | Rep. gain |
| 33rd district | Mark Veasey (D) | –33.68% | –32.59% | Dem. hold | Dem. hold |
| 34th district | Vicente Gonzalez (D) | +4.42% | +10.13% | Rep. gain | Dem. hold |
| 35th district | Greg Casar (D) | –33.49% | +10.44% | Rep. gain | Dem. hold |
| 36th district | Brian Babin (R) | +36.77% | +24.93% | Rep. hold | Rep. hold |
| 37th district | Lloyd Doggett (D) | –49.00% | –56.23% | Dem. hold | Dem. hold |
| 38th district | Wesley Hunt (R) | +20.68% | +20.91% | Rep. hold | Rep. hold |

== Legal challenge ==
LULAC v. Abbott
- Court: Western District of Texas
- Full case name: League of United Latin American Citizens v. Greg Abbott
- Docket nos.: 3:21-cv-00259 (W.D. Tex.); 25A608 and 25-845 (Supreme Court)

Case history
- Prior action: map preliminarily enjoined by Western District of Texas.
- Subsequent actions: December 2025: District order stayed by Supreme Court via shadow docket April 2026: District court judgment reversed by Supreme Court

On November 18, 2025, a federal court in El Paso, Texas ruled that the redistricting constituted a racial gerrymander, a ruling which would have barred the map from being used for the 2026 midterms. The ruling also disrupted campaign planning for candidates across Texas ahead of the 2026 elections. However, on November 21, the U.S. Supreme Court approved a request filed by Texas to temporarily block the lower court ruling.

On December 4, the Supreme Court stayed the District Court ruling in a 6–3 decision that allows Texas to use the map in 2026, concluding that the District Court had "failed to honor the presumption of legislative good faith by construing ambiguous direct and circumstantial evidence against the legislature" in finding that the map was racially gerrymandered, and had "improperly inserted itself into an active primary campaign" because it issued its ruling after the candidate filing period had begun. The dissenting opinion, written by Elena Kagan and joined by Sonia Sotomayor and Ketanji Brown Jackson, argued that the majority was not following the appropriate standard of review for questions of fact, stating, "We are a higher court than the District Court, but we are not a better one when it comes to making such a fact-based decision." The Supreme Court formalized the reversal and allowing the new map to be used in 2026 in a summary order on April 27, 2026, with Kagan, Sotomayor, and Jackson dissenting.

== Impact ==
=== Political effects ===
The proposed redistricting map intends to give Republicans five additional seats in the 2026 United States House of Representatives elections. The map splits voters of color in Tarrant County and alters Texas's 35th congressional district, established in a court order by the United States District Court for the District of Columbia. It establishes two majority-white districts, two majority-African American districts, and one majority-Hispanic district. The map condenses several Democratic incumbents against each other, setting up the possibility of primary conflicts, but does not ensure a Republican victory. The map estimates that Hispanic voters in three districts will support Republicans without Donald Trump on the ballot. In two multiracial districts, the proposed map does not alleviate concerns raised by the United States Department of Justice in its letter. The map was drawn primarily by the executive director of the National Republican Redistricting Trust, Adam Kincaid, who subsequently defended it in court. Attorney Chris Gober, who eventually won the Republican primary in the newly drawn 10th district, reportedly played a role in helping Kincaid draw the map.

=== Retaliatory redistricting measures ===
In July 2025, The Texas Tribune reported that Democrats representing California in the United States House of Representatives and allies of Governor Gavin Newsom began considering retaliatory redistricting measures; a spokesperson for Newsom denied the Tribune's reporting. At a press conference in Los Angeles, Newsom publicly called for redrawing California's congressional districts. After meeting with Texas Democrats, Newsom and Illinois Governor JB Pritzker suggested that their states could follow in redistricting. In the New York State Legislature, Democrats introduced a bill to allow the state to redraw its congressional boundaries every five years if another state does so first. A spokesperson for Maryland Governor Wes Moore told The Baltimore Sun that Moore would "evaluate all options as states around the country make decisions regarding redistricting", but did not answer questions on whether he supported a bill introduced by House majority leader David Moon that would automatically restart the state's redistricting process if another state passed new congressional districts. The Democratic Legislative Campaign Committee urged Democratic-led legislatures to redistrict.

To avert a "redistricting war", Representative Kevin Kiley (CA-03), whose seat would be vulnerable if California updated their maps, introduced legislation to ban mid-decade redistricting efforts and nullify maps approved before the 2030 United States census, though Kiley did not mention stopping redistricting in Texas. He instead shifted the blame to Governor Gavin Newsom's intent to redistrict in California rather than Governor Greg Abbott, who has gone ahead with such plans in Texas.

=== Redistricting litigation ===
According to The Texas Tribune, state officials could request litigation regarding Texas's legislative boundaries drawn after the 2020 United States census be dropped if the state redistricts. The Office of the Texas Legislative Council also notes that failure to redistrict house or senate districts during the first regular session after the decennial census is released, Section 28, Article ||| of the Texas Constitution directs the board to convene within 90 days after the session ends and 60 days from its first meeting to make and approve a new plan.

=== Public safety threats ===
On August 6, 2025, a bomb threat forced 400 people to evacuate the hotel in St. Charles, Illinois, where some Democratic lawmakers from Texas were staying. The St. Charles Police Department stated that first responders arrived at the hotel around 7:15 a.m. and "conducted a thorough search and no device was found", and that "In response to the threat, 400 people were immediately evacuated and the area was secured as bomb squad units conducted their investigation."

== Aftermath ==
Due to a strong Democratic performance in the 2026 United States elections, the redistricting backfired. Republicans only flipped one of their five targets and lost two seats they previously held for a net loss of one seat heading into the 120th United States Congress. However, a later analysis shows Republicans did get one more seat then they would’ve without any redistricting.

== See also ==
- 2003 Texas redistricting – Controversial redistricting of Texas's districts for the U.S. House of Representatives
- 2025 California Proposition 50 – US state constitutional amendment
- 2026 Missouri Proposition A – Veto referendum on congressional districts
- California–Texas rivalry
- 89th Texas Legislature
