= 2018 Texas Comptroller of Public Accounts election =

- November 6, 2018
- Turnout: 52.1% ▲19.3pp
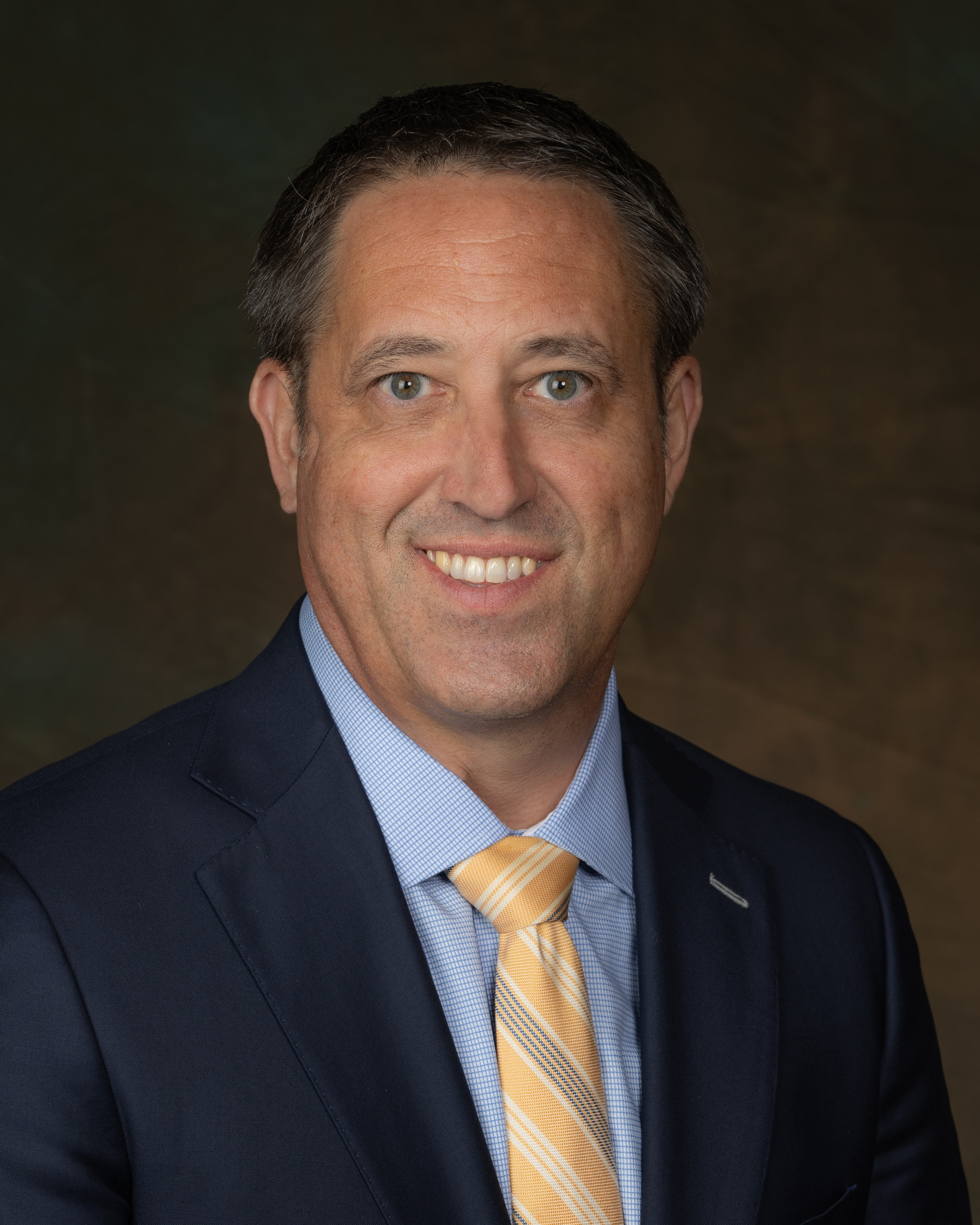

Nominee	Glenn Hegar	Joi Chevalier
Party	Republican	Democratic
Popular vote	4,376,828	3,570,693
Percentage	53.2%	43.4%
- Hegar: 40–50% 50–60% 60–70% 70–80% 80–90% >90% Chevalier: 40–50% 50–60% 60–70% 70–80% 80–90% >90% Sanders: >90% Tie: 40–50% 50% No data
Comptroller before election
Glenn Hegar
Republican
Elected Comptroller
Glenn Hegar
Republican

The 2018 Texas Comptroller of Public Accounts election took place on November 6, 2018, to elect the comptroller of public accounts of Texas. Incumbent Republican comptroller Glenn Hegar ran for re-election to a second term, and won the Republican primary unopposed. Business owner Joi Chevalier narrowly defeated former Austin Community College trustee Tim Mahoney in the Democratic primary. Hegar a second term, but with a greatly reduced margin from his first election, likely due to the down-ballot impact of Democrat Beto O'Rourke's near-victory against Republican Ted Cruz in the concurrent U.S. Senate election. Hegar earned 53% of the vote to Chevalier's 43%.

== Republican primary ==
=== Candidates ===
- Glenn Hegar, incumbent comptroller

=== Results ===
Republican primary results
Party	Candidate	Votes	%
Republican	Glenn Hegar (incumbent)	1,271,222	100.0%
Total votes		1,271,222	100.0%

== Democratic primary ==
=== Candidates ===
- Joi Chevalier, business owner
- Tim Mahoney, attorney, former Austin Community College trustee

=== Results ===
Democratic primary results
Party	Candidate	Votes	%
Democratic	Joi Chevalier	486,702	51.87%
Democratic	Tim Mahoney	451,687	48.13%
Total votes		938,389	100.0%

=== Libertarian state convention ===
==== Candidates ====
- Ben Sanders

== General election ==
=== Results ===
2018 Texas Comptroller of Public Accounts election
Party	Candidate	Votes	%	±%
Republican	Glenn Hegar (incumbent)	4,376,828	53.19	▼5.19
Democratic	Joi Chevalier	3,570,693	43.39	▲5.70
Libertarian	Ben Sanders	281,081	3.42%	▲0.46
Total votes		8,228,602	100.00	
Republican hold				

==== By congressional district ====
Hegar won 25 of 36 congressional districts, including two that elected Democrats.

District	Hegar	Chevalier	Representative
1st	72%	25%	Louie Gohmert
2nd	54%	43%	Ted Poe
2nd	54%	43%	Dan Crenshaw
3rd	55%	42%	Sam Johnson
3rd	55%	42%	Van Taylor
4th	75%	22%	John Ratcliffe
5th	62%	35%	Jeb Hensarling
5th	62%	35%	Lance Gooden
6th	53%	43%	Joe Barton
6th	53%	43%	Ron Wright
7th	52%	46%	John Culberson
7th	52%	46%	Lizzie Fletcher
8th	73%	24%	Kevin Brady
9th	20%	77%	Al Green
10th	53%	44%	Michael McCaul
11th	79%	19%	Mike Conaway
12th	62%	34%	Kay Granger
13th	80%	17%	Mac Thornberry
14th	59%	38%	Randy Weber
15th	42%	54%	Vicente Gonzalez
16th	28%	66%	Beto O'Rourke
16th	28%	66%	Veronica Escobar
17th	57%	39%	Bill Flores
18th	23%	74%	Sheila Jackson Lee
19th	73%	24%	Jodey Arrington
20th	35%	61%	Joaquín Castro
21st	53%	43%	Lamar Smith
21st	53%	43%	Chip Roy
22nd	53%	44%	Pete Olson
23rd	49%	47%	Will Hurd
24th	52%	45%	Kenny Marchant
25th	55%	41%	Roger Williams
26th	60%	36%	Michael Burgess
27th	62%	35%	Michael Cloud
28th	40%	55%	Henry Cuellar
29th	27%	70%	Gene Green
29th	27%	70%	Sylvia Garcia
30th	19%	77%	Eddie Bernice Johnson
31st	54%	42%	John Carter
32nd	49%	47%	Pete Sessions
32nd	49%	47%	Colin Allred
33rd	23%	73%	Marc Veasey
34th	41%	54%	Filemon Vela Jr.
35th	29%	66%	Lloyd Doggett
36th	72%	25%	Brian Babin
