= 2018 Texas Attorney General election =

- November 6, 2018
- Turnout: 41.6% (▲17.0%)
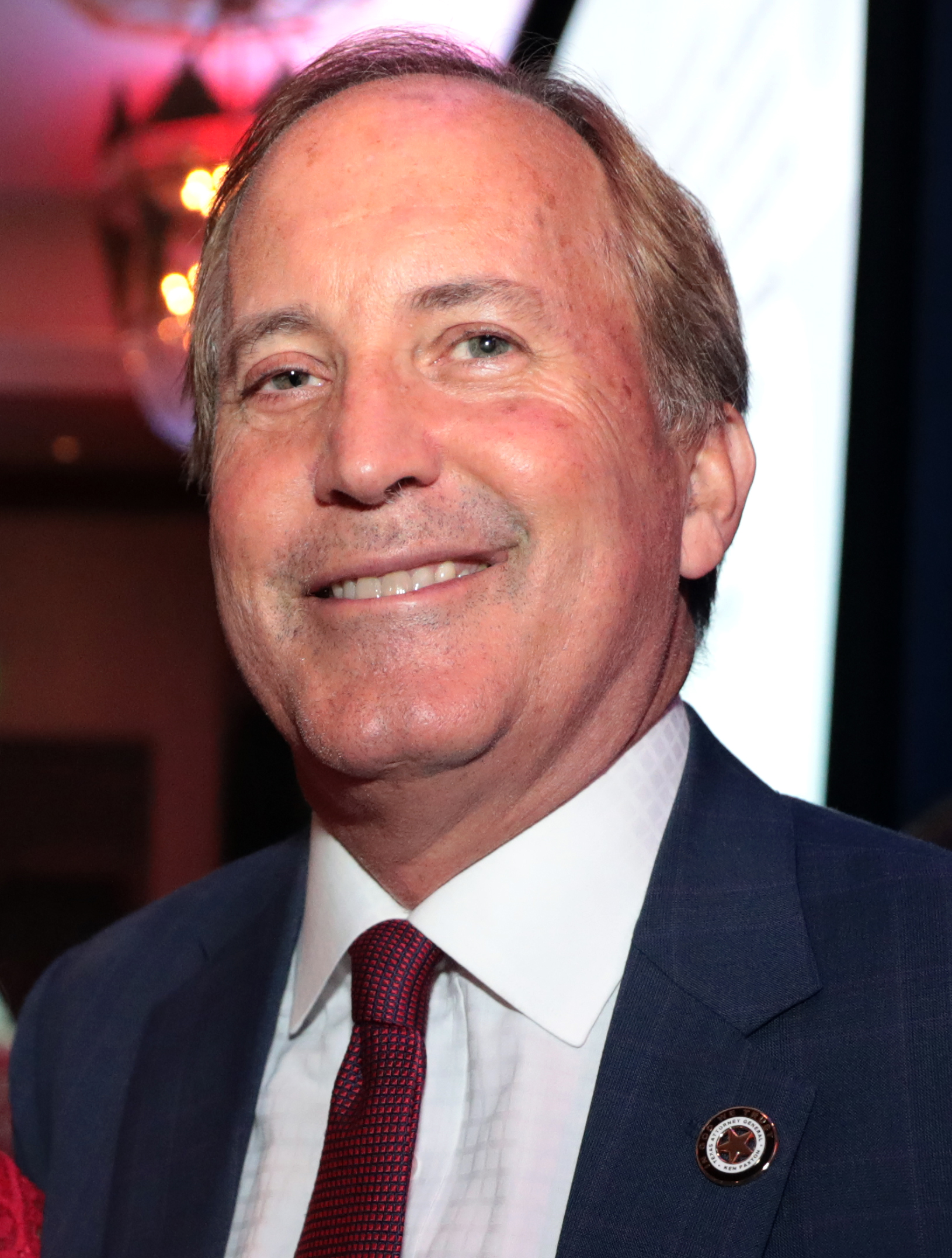

Nominee	Ken Paxton	Justin Nelson
Party	Republican	Democratic
Popular vote	4,193,207	3,898,098
Percentage	50.57%	47.01%
- Paxton: 40–50% 50–60% 60–70% 70–80% 80–90% >90% Nelson: 40–50% 50–60% 60–70% 70–80% 80–90% >90% Tie: 40–50% 50% No data
Attorney General before election
Ken Paxton
Republican
Elected Attorney General
Ken Paxton
Republican

The 2018 Texas Attorney General election took place on November 6, 2018, to elect the Attorney General of Texas. Incumbent Republican Attorney General Ken Paxton ran for re-election. The Democratic Party nominated attorney Justin Nelson.

Paxton was narrowly re-elected to a second term by a 3.56% margin of victory.

== Republican primary ==
=== Candidates ===
- Ken Paxton, incumbent attorney general

=== Results ===
Republican primary results
Party	Candidate	Votes	%	±%
Republican	Ken Paxton (incumbent)	1,312,172	100%	+55.55%
Total votes		1,312,172	100%	+32,112
Turnout			8.6%*	−0.81%*

*Percentage of turnout to registered voters

== Democratic primary ==
=== Candidates ===
- Justin Nelson, Susman Godfrey partner

=== Results ===
Democratic primary results
Party	Candidate	Votes	%	±%
Democratic	Justin Nelson	884,376	100%	
Total votes		884,376	100%	+446,858
Turnout			5.79%*	+2.57%*

*Percentage of turnout to registered voters

== Libertarian convention ==
=== Nominated ===
- Michael Ray Harris, attorney

== General election ==
=== Predictions ===
Source	Ranking	As of
Governing	Safe R	October 26, 2018

=== Endorsements ===
Ken Paxton

U.S. executive branch officials

- Donald Trump, 45th president of the United States

Organizations

- National Rifle Association of America
- Open Carry Texas

=== Polling ===
View source data.

Poll source	Date(s) administered	Sample size	Margin of error	Ken Paxton (R)	Justin Nelson (D)	Michael Ray Harris (L)	Other	Undecided
Dixie Strategies	September 6–7, 2018	519	± 4.3%	45%	39%	2%	–	15%
Texas Lyceum	July 9–26, 2018	441	± 4.7%	35%	25%	4%	–	37%
Gravis Marketing	July 3–7, 2018	602	± 4.0%	45%	41%	–	–	14%
UoT/Texas Tribune	June 8–17, 2018	1,200	± 2.83%	32%	31%	6%	4%	26%
Baselice & Associates (R-TLRPAC)	May 21–28, 2018	–	–	45%	33%	–	–	–

=== Results ===
General election results
Party	Candidate	Votes	%	±%
Republican	Ken Paxton (incumbent)	4,193,207	50.57%	−8.23%
Democratic	Justin Nelson	3,898,098	47.01%	+8.99%
Libertarian	Michael Ray Harris	201,310	2.43%	−0.10%
Total votes		8,292,615	100%	
Republican hold				

==== By congressional district ====
Paxton won 21 of 36 congressional districts, with the remaining 15 going to Nelson, including two that elected Republicans.

District	Paxton	Nelson	Representative
1st	71%	28%	Louie Gohmert
2nd	50%	48%	Ted Poe
2nd	50%	48%	Dan Crenshaw
3rd	51%	46%	Sam Johnson
3rd	51%	46%	Van Taylor
4th	73%	25%	John Ratcliffe
5th	59%	39%	Jeb Hensarling
5th	59%	39%	Lance Gooden
6th	51%	47%	Joe Barton
6th	51%	47%	Ron Wright
7th	46%	52%	John Culberson
7th	46%	52%	Lizzie Fletcher
8th	71%	27%	Kevin Brady
9th	19%	80%	Al Green
10th	49%	48%	Michael McCaul
11th	76%	21%	Mike Conaway
12th	60%	38%	Kay Granger
13th	78%	20%	Mac Thornberry
14th	57%	41%	Randy Weber
15th	41%	57%	Vicente Gonzalez
16th	28%	68%	Beto O'Rourke
16th	28%	68%	Veronica Escobar
17th	54%	43%	Bill Flores
18th	20%	78%	Sheila Jackson Lee
19th	70%	27%	Jodey Arrington
20th	33%	64%	Joaquín Castro
21st	49%	48%	Lamar Smith
21st	49%	48%	Chip Roy
22nd	50%	48%	Pete Olson
23rd	47%	50%	Will Hurd
24th	48%	49%	Kenny Marchant
25th	52%	46%	Roger Williams
26th	57%	40%	Michael Burgess
27th	59%	38%	Michael Cloud
28th	39%	59%	Henry Cuellar
29th	26%	73%	Gene Green
29th	26%	73%	Sylvia Garcia
30th	18%	80%	Eddie Bernice Johnson
31st	50%	46%	John Carter
32nd	45%	53%	Pete Sessions
32nd	45%	53%	Colin Allred
33rd	22%	75%	Marc Veasey
34th	40%	57%	Filemon Vela Jr.
35th	28%	69%	Lloyd Doggett
36th	70%	28%	Brian Babin

== See also ==
- Texas Attorney General
- 2018 Texas elections
