= Nicole Collier =

Texas state legislator (born 1972)

Nicole Denise Johnson Collier
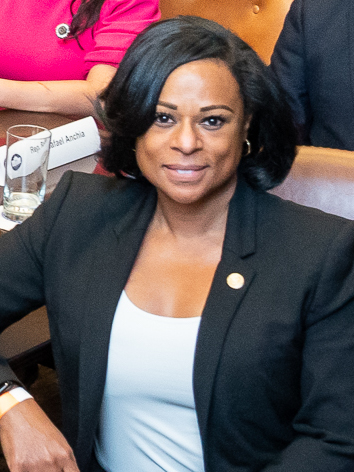
- Collier in 2021

Member of the Texas House of Representatives from the 95th district
- Incumbent
- Assumed office January 8, 2013
- Preceded by: Marc Veasey

Personal details
- Born: September 12, 1972 (age 53)
- Party: Democratic
- Education: University of Houston; Texas Wesleyan University School of Law
- Occupation: Attorney
- Website: Campaign website

Nicole Denise Johnson Collier (born September 12, 1972) is a Democratic member of the Texas House of Representatives. Since 2013, she has represented District 95 in Fort Worth, Texas. Collier succeeded Marc Veasey.

A small business owner and trial lawyer, Collier is a 1996 graduate of the University of Houston. She graduated from the Texas Wesleyan University School of Law in Fort Worth, now Texas A&M University School of Law.

In the general election on November 4, 2014, Collier won her second term in the Texas House by defeating Republican candidate, Albert G. McDaniel, by a margin of 21,908 votes (75.8 percent) to 7,002 votes (24.2 percent).

Collier won her fourth legislative term in the general election held on November 6, 2018. With 32,953 votes (76.5 percent), Collier defeated the Republican candidate, Stephen A. West, who polled 9,384 votes (21.8 percent), and the Libertarian Party choice, Joshua G. Burns, who drew 734 (1.7 percent).

On August 4, 2025, Collier was one of over 50 Democratic representatives who left the state in order to trigger a quorum-bust during a special session, in an attempt to delay the passage of controversial new congressional maps. After two weeks, the absent members returned to the state, once a new special session had been called and other states had pledged to participate in their own redistricting efforts in order to offset any partisan gains on August 18. During their absence, Speaker of the House Dustin Burrows, issued a "call of the house" in order to physically enforce the maintenance of quorum until the redistricting legislation was passed. Since the "call of the house" remained in effect till the final passage of the new maps, Burrows had the members who participated in the quorum-bust sign permission slips and consent to a police escort from DPS officers to ensure their return to the chamber. Collier refused to sign the permission slips and as such was not allowed to leave the chamber while the call was in force and she slept in the chamber. The next day more representatives joined her in solidarity by tearing up their own permission slips and joining her in the chamber. Collier remained in the chamber until the House approved the new maps on August 20.

Texas House of Representatives
Preceded by Marc Veasey	Texas State Representative for District 95 (Tarrant County); 2013–present	Succeeded by Incumbent
