= Texas's 35th congressional district =

U.S. House district for Texas

Coordinates: 29.8400°N 97.6100°W

- Interactive map of district boundaries
- Representative: Greg Casar; D–Austin
- Distribution: 95.99% urban; 4.01% rural
- Population (2025): 859,022
- Median household income: $79,534
- Ethnicity: 55.1% Hispanic; 26.2% White; 11.9% Black; 3.2% Two or more races; 2.9% Asian; 0.8% other
- Cook PVI: D+19

Texas's 35th congressional district is a district that was created as a result of the 2010 United States census. The first candidates ran in the 2012 House elections and were seated for the 113th United States Congress. This election was won by Lloyd Doggett, who previously represented Texas's 25th congressional district before redistricting.

The district includes parts of the San Antonio metropolitan area (primarily black- and Hispanic-majority areas), including portions of Bexar County, thin strips of Comal and Hays counties, a portion of Caldwell County, and portions of southern and eastern Austin in Travis County. The district roughly follows Interstate 35 between San Antonio and Austin.

In March 2017, a panel of federal judges ruled that the 35th district was illegally drawn with discriminatory intent. In August 2017, another panel of federal judges in San Antonio ruled that the district was unconstitutional. However, the district was allowed to stand in the U.S. Supreme Court's 2018 Abbott v. Perez ruling.

Greg Casar, from Austin, won the 2022 election for this seat; Doggett moved to the newly created 37th district, centered almost entirely on Austin and containing small amounts of its suburbs, and won the election there. As a result, Austin will be represented by two Democrats in the House.

== Recent election results from statewide races ==
=== 2023–2027 boundaries ===
Year	Office	Results
2008	President	Obama 68% - 32%
2012	President	Obama 69% - 31%
2014	Senate	Alameel 65% - 35%
2014	Governor	Davis 69% - 31%
2016	President	Clinton 68% - 26%
2018	Senate	O'Rourke 76% - 23%
2018	Governor	Valdez 70% - 28%
2018	Lt. Governor	Collier 72% - 25%
2018	Attorney General	Nelson 74% - 23%
2018	Comptroller of Public Accounts	Chevalier 70% - 25%
2020	President	Biden 72% - 26%
2020	Senate	Hegar 69% - 28%
2022	Governor	O'Rourke 73% - 26%
2022	Lt. Governor	Collier 70% - 25%
2022	Attorney General	Mercedes Garza 72% - 25%
2022	Comptroller of Public Accounts	Dudding 68% - 27%
2024	President	Harris 66% - 32%
2024	Senate	Allred 68% - 29%

=== 2027–2033 boundaries ===
Year	Office	Results
2008	President	McCain 53% - 46%
2012	President	Romney 54% - 46%
2014	Senate	Cornyn 63% - 37%
2014	Governor	Abbott 58% - 42%
2016	President	Trump 50% - 45%
2018	Senate	Cruz 50% - 49%
2018	Governor	Abbott 55% - 43%
2018	Lt. Governor	Patrick 51% - 47%
2018	Attorney General	Paxton 49% - 48%
2018	Comptroller of Public Accounts	Hegar 51% - 45%
2020	President	Trump 50% - 48%
2020	Senate	Cornyn 52% - 46%
2022	Governor	Abbott 52% - 46%
2022	Lt. Governor	Patrick 52% - 44%
2022	Attorney General	Paxton 52% - 45%
2022	Comptroller of Public Accounts	Hegar 54% - 43%
2024	President	Trump 55% - 44%
2024	Senate	Cruz 51% - 47%
2026	Senate	Talarico 57% - 40%
2026	Governor	Hinojosa 55% - 43%

== Current composition ==
For the 118th and successive Congresses (based on redistricting following the 2020 census), the district contains all or portions of the following counties and communities:

Bexar County (7)

Converse (part; also 28th), Kirby, Live Oak (part; also 28th), San Antonio (part; also 20th, 21st, 23rd, and 28th; shared with Comal and Medina counties), Schertz (part; also 21st and 28th; shared with Comal and Guadalupe counties), Selma (part; also 28th; shared with Comal County), Windcrest (part; also 28th)

Comal County (3)

New Braunfels (part; also 15th, 21st, and 28th; shared with Guadalupe County), Schertz (part; also 21st and 28th; shared with Bexar and Guadalupe counties), Selma (part; also 28th; shared with Bexar County)

Hays County (7)

Austin (part; also 10th, 21st, and 37th; shared with Travis and Williamson counties), Buda (part; also 21st), Creedmoor (shared with Travis County), Kyle (part; also 21st), Niederwald (part; also 27th; shared with Caldwell County), San Marcos (part; also 21st and 27th; shared with Caldwell County), Uhland (part; also 27th; shared with Caldwell County)

Travis County (8)

Austin (part; also 10th, 21st, and 37th; shared with Hays and Williamson counties), Creedmoor (shared with Hays County), Garfield, Hornsby Bend, Manor (part; also 10th), Mustang Ridge (part; also 27th; shared with Bastrop and Caldwell counties) Pflugerville (part; also 10th, 17th, and 37th; shared with Williamson County), Webberville (part; also 10th)

== Future composition ==
Beginning with the 2026 election, the 35th district will consist of the following counties:

- Bexar (part)
- Guadalupe
- Karnes
- Wilson

== List of representatives ==
Representative	Party	Years	Cong ress	Electoral history	District location
District established January 3, 2013
Lloyd Doggett (Austin)	Democratic	January 3, 2013 – January 3, 2023	113th 114th 115th 116th 117th	Redistricted from the 25th district and re-elected in 2012. Re-elected in 2014. Re-elected in 2016. Re-elected in 2018. Re-elected in 2020. Redistricted to the 37th district.	2013–2023 Parts of Bexar, Caldwell, Comal, Hays, and Travis
Greg Casar (Austin)	Democratic	January 3, 2023 – present	118th 119th	Elected in 2022. Re-elected in 2024. Redistricted to the 37th district.	2023–2027 Parts of Bexar, Comal, Hays, and Travis
Johnny Garcia (San Antonio)	Democratic	Assuming office on January 3, 2027		Elected in 2026.	2027–present Parts of Bexar, Guadalupe, Karnes, and Wilson

== Election results ==
=== 2012 ===
Texas's 35th congressional district election, 2012
Party	Candidate	Votes	%
Democratic	Lloyd Doggett	105,626	63.94%
Republican	Susan Narvaiz	52,894	32.02%
Libertarian	Ross Lynn Leonne	4,082	2.47%
Green	Meghan Owen	2,540	1.53%
Majority		52,732	31.92%
Total votes		165,179	100%

=== 2014 ===
Texas's 35th congressional district election, 2014
Party	Candidate	Votes	%	±%
Democratic	Lloyd Doggett (incumbent)	60,124	62.48%	−1.46%
Republican	Susan Narvaiz	32,040	33.29%	+1.27%
Libertarian	Cory W. Bruner	2,767	2.87%	+.4%
Green	Kat Swift	1,294	1.34%	−.19%
Majority		28,084	29.19%	
Total votes		96,225	100%	
Democratic hold		Swing	−1.46%	

=== 2016 ===
Texas's 35th congressional district election, 2016
Party	Candidate	Votes	%	±%
Democratic	Lloyd Doggett (incumbent)	124,613	63.07%	+0.59%
Republican	Susan Narvaiz	62,384	31.57%	−1.72%
Libertarian	Rhet Rosenquest Smith	6,504	3.29%	+.42%
Green	Scott Trimble	4,076	2.06%	+.62%
Majority		62,228	31.50%	+2.31%
Total votes		197,516	100%	
Democratic hold		Swing	+0.59%	

=== 2018 ===
Texas's 35th congressional district election, 2018
Party	Candidate	Votes	%	±%
Democratic	Lloyd Doggett (incumbent)	138,278	71.25%	+8.18%
Republican	David Smalling	50,553	26.05%	−5.52%
Libertarian	Clark Patterson	5,236	2.70%	+.64%
Majority		87,725	45.20%	+13.70%
Total votes		194,067	100%	
Democratic hold		Swing	+8.18%	

=== 2020 ===
Texas's 35th congressional district election, 2020
Party	Candidate	Votes	%
Democratic	Lloyd Doggett (incumbent)	176,373	65.4
Republican	Jennifer Garcia Sharon	80,795	30.0
Libertarian	Mark Loewe	7,393	2.7
Independent	Jason Mata	5,236	1.9
Total votes		269,797	100.0
Democratic hold			

=== 2022 ===
Texas's 35th congressional district election, 2022
Party	Candidate	Votes	%
Democratic	Greg Casar	129,599	72.5
Republican	Dan McQueen	48,969	27.4
Total votes		178,568	100.0
Democratic hold			

=== 2024 ===
Texas's 35th congressional district election, 2024
Party	Candidate	Votes	%
Democratic	Greg Casar (incumbent)	169,896	67.4
Republican	Steven Wright	82,354	32.6
Total votes		252,250	100.0
Democratic hold			
