= Texas's 28th congressional district =

U.S. House district for Texas

Coordinates: 27°50′55″N 98°54′49″W

- Interactive map of district boundaries
- Representative: Henry Cuellar; D–Laredo
- Distribution: 82.75% urban; 17.25% rural
- Population (2025): 838,333
- Median household income: $68,136
- Ethnicity: 75.3% Hispanic; 17.2% White; 4.4% Black; 1.7% Two or more races; 0.9% Asian; 0.5% other
- Cook PVI: R+2

Texas's 28th congressional district of the United States House of Representatives covers a strip in deep south Texas starting in the eastern outskirts of San Antonio, and ending at the U.S.–Mexico border. Towns entirely or partially within this district include Converse, Laredo, Rio Grande City, and Universal City. TX-28 includes The Alamo, a historic monument in what is now downtown San Antonio that plays a central role in Texas' identity. The current Representative from the 28th district is Henry Cuellar.

The district was one of 13 congressional districts that voted for Donald Trump in the 2024 presidential election while simultaneously electing a Democrat in the 2024 House of Representatives elections.

== Recent election results from statewide races ==
=== 2023–2027 boundaries ===
Year	Office	Results
2008	President	Obama 59% - 40%
2012	President	Obama 61% - 39%
2014	Senate	Alameel 51% - 49%
2014	Governor	Davis 55% - 45%
2016	President	Clinton 57% - 38%
2018	Senate	O'Rourke 59% - 40%
2018	Governor	Valdez 53% - 46%
2018	Lt. Governor	Collier 57% - 41%
2018	Attorney General	Nelson 59% - 39%
2018	Comptroller of Public Accounts	Chevalier 55% - 40%
2020	President	Biden 53% - 46%
2020	Senate	Hegar 52% - 45%
2022	Governor	O'Rourke 52% - 46%
2022	Lt. Governor	Collier 50% - 46%
2022	Attorney General	Mercedes Garza 52% - 45%
2022	Comptroller of Public Accounts	Dudding 49% - 46%
2024	President	Trump 53% - 46%
2024	Senate	Allred 49% - 48%

=== 2027–2033 boundaries ===
Year	Office	Results
2008	President	Obama 67% - 32%
2012	President	Obama 70% - 30%
2014	Senate	Alameel 60% - 40%
2014	Governor	Davis 62% - 38%
2016	President	Clinton 66% - 30%
2018	Senate	O'Rourke 66% - 34%
2018	Governor	Valdez 60% - 39%
2018	Lt. Governor	Collier 65% - 33%
2018	Attorney General	Nelson 66% - 31%
2018	Comptroller of Public Accounts	Chevalier 62% - 32%
2020	President	Biden 54% - 45%
2020	Senate	Hegar 54% - 42%
2022	Governor	O'Rourke 54% - 44%
2022	Lt. Governor	Collier 53% - 44%
2022	Attorney General	Mercedes Garza 56% - 42%
2022	Comptroller of Public Accounts	Dudding 52% - 42%
2024	President	Trump 55% - 44%
2024	Senate	Cruz 48.8% - 48.6%
2026	Senate	Talarico 68% - 29%
2026	Governor	Hinojosa 66% - 33%

== Current composition ==
For the 118th and successive Congresses (based on redistricting following the 2020 census), the district contains all or portions of the following counties and communities:

Atascosa County (7)

All 7 communities

Bexar County (7)

China Grove, Converse (part; also 35th), Elmendorf, Live Oak (part; also 35th), St. Hedwig, San Antonio (part; also 20th, 21st, 23rd, 35th; shared with Comal and Medina counties), Sandy Oaks

Duval County (5)

All 5 communities

Guadalupe County (10)

Cibolo (shared with Bexar County), Lake Dunlap, Marion, McQueeney, New Berlin, New Braunfels (part; also 21st and 35th; shared with Comal County), Santa Clara, Schertz (part; also 35th; shared with Bexar and Comal counties), Seguin (part; also 15th), Zuehl

Jim Hogg County (5)

All 5 communities

McMullen County (1)

Tilden

Starr County (115)

All 115 communities

Webb County (40)

All 40 communities

Zapata County (12)

All 12 communities

== Future composition ==
Beginning with the 2026 election, the 28th district will consist of the following counties:

- Atascosa
- Dimmit
- Duval
- Hidalgo (part)
- Jim Hogg
- La Salle
- Live Oak
- Maverick (part)
- McMullen
- Starr
- Webb
- Zapata

== List of members representing the district ==
Member	Party	Years	Cong ress	Electoral history	District location
District established January 3, 1993
Frank Tejeda (San Antonio)	Democratic	January 3, 1993 – January 30, 1997	103rd 104th 105th	Elected in 1992. Re-elected in 1994. Re-elected in 1996. Died.	1993–2003; Atascosa, Duval, Frio, Jim Hogg, La Salle, McMullen, Starr, Wilson, and Zapata; parts of Bexar, Comal, Guadalupe, and Jim Wells
Vacant		January 30, 1997 – April 17, 1997	105th		1993–2003; Atascosa, Duval, Frio, Jim Hogg, La Salle, McMullen, Starr, Wilson, and Zapata; parts of Bexar, Comal, Guadalupe, and Jim Wells
Ciro Rodriguez (San Antonio)	Democratic	April 17, 1997 – January 3, 2005	105th 106th 107th 108th	Elected to finish Tejeda's term. Re-elected in 1998. Re-elected in 2000. Re-elected in 2002. Lost renomination.	1993–2003; Atascosa, Duval, Frio, Jim Hogg, La Salle, McMullen, Starr, Wilson, and Zapata; parts of Bexar, Comal, Guadalupe, and Jim Wells
Ciro Rodriguez (San Antonio)	Democratic	April 17, 1997 – January 3, 2005	105th 106th 107th 108th	Elected to finish Tejeda's term. Re-elected in 1998. Re-elected in 2000. Re-elected in 2002. Lost renomination.	2003–2005; Atascosa, Duval, Frio, Jim Hogg, Jim Wells, La Salle, McMullen, Starr, and Zapata; parts of Bexar and Hidalgo
Henry Cuellar (Laredo)	Democratic	January 3, 2005 – present	109th 110th 111th 112th 113th 114th 115th 116th 117th 118th 119th	Elected in 2004. Re-elected in 2006. Re-elected in 2008. Re-elected in 2010. Re-elected in 2012. Re-elected in 2014. Re-elected in 2016. Re-elected in 2018. Re-elected in 2020. Re-elected in 2022. Re-elected in 2024. Re-elected in 2026.	2005–2007 Atascosa, Frio, Guadalupe, La Salle, McMullen, Webb, Wilson, and Zapata; parts of Bexar, Comal, and Hays
Henry Cuellar (Laredo)	Democratic	January 3, 2005 – present	109th 110th 111th 112th 113th 114th 115th 116th 117th 118th 119th	Elected in 2004. Re-elected in 2006. Re-elected in 2008. Re-elected in 2010. Re-elected in 2012. Re-elected in 2014. Re-elected in 2016. Re-elected in 2018. Re-elected in 2020. Re-elected in 2022. Re-elected in 2024. Re-elected in 2026.	2007–2013 Atascosa, Frio, Guadalupe, Jim Hogg, La Salle, McMullen, Starr, Webb, and Zapata; parts of Bexar and Hidalgo
Henry Cuellar (Laredo)	Democratic	January 3, 2005 – present	109th 110th 111th 112th 113th 114th 115th 116th 117th 118th 119th	Elected in 2004. Re-elected in 2006. Re-elected in 2008. Re-elected in 2010. Re-elected in 2012. Re-elected in 2014. Re-elected in 2016. Re-elected in 2018. Re-elected in 2020. Re-elected in 2022. Re-elected in 2024. Re-elected in 2026.	2013–2023 Atascosa, McMullen, Starr, Webb, and Zapata; parts of Bexar, Hidalgo, La Salle, and Wilson
Henry Cuellar (Laredo)	Democratic	January 3, 2005 – present	109th 110th 111th 112th 113th 114th 115th 116th 117th 118th 119th	Elected in 2004. Re-elected in 2006. Re-elected in 2008. Re-elected in 2010. Re-elected in 2012. Re-elected in 2014. Re-elected in 2016. Re-elected in 2018. Re-elected in 2020. Re-elected in 2022. Re-elected in 2024. Re-elected in 2026.	2023–present Atascosa, Bexar (part), Duval, Guadalupe (part), Jim Hogg, McMullen, Starr, Webb, Zapata

== Recent election results ==
=== 2004 election ===
US House election, 2004: Texas District 28
Party	Candidate	Votes	%	±%
Democratic	Henry Cuellar	106,323	59.0	−12.1
Republican	James Hopson	69,538	38.6	+11.7
Libertarian	Ken Ashby	4,305	2.4	+0.3
Majority		36,785	20.4	
Turnout		180,166		
Democratic hold		Swing	-11.9	

=== 2006 election ===
On June 28, 2006, the U.S. Supreme Court declared that the Texas legislature's redistricting plan violated the Voting Rights Act in the case of Texas's 23rd congressional district. As a result, on August 4, 2006, a three-judge panel replaced district boundaries for 2006 election for the 23rd district, which affected the boundaries of the 15th, 21st, 25th and 28th districts.

On election day in November, these five districts had "jungle primaries": any candidate that receives more than 50% of the vote wins the seat. Otherwise, a runoff election in December decides the seat.

Cuellar retained his seat in the 28th district.

=== 2008 election ===
US House election, 2008: Texas District 28
Party	Candidate	Votes	%	±%
Democratic	Henry Cuellar (incumbent)	123,494	68.7	+9.7
Republican	Jim Fish	52,524	29.2	−9.38
Libertarian	Ross Lynn Leone	3,722	2.1	−0.3
Majority		70,969		
Turnout		179,740		
Democratic hold		Swing	+10.0	

=== 2010 election ===
US House election, 2010: Texas District 28
Party	Candidate	Votes	%	±%
Democratic	Henry Cuellar (incumbent)	62,773	56.34	−12.4
Republican	Bryan Underwood	46,740	41.95	+12.75
Libertarian	Stephen Kaat	1,889	1.7	−0.4
Majority		14,144	12.69	
Turnout		111,402		
Democratic hold		Swing		

=== 2012 election ===
US House election, 2012, Texas District 28
Party	Candidate	Votes	%
Democratic	Henry Cuellar (Incumbent)	112,456	67.89
Republican	William R. Hayward	49,309	29.77
Libertarian	Patrick Hisel	2,473	1.49
Green	Michael D. Cary	1,407	0.85
Total votes		165,645	100.0

=== 2014 election ===
US House election, 2014: Texas District 28
Party	Candidate	Votes	%	±%
Democratic	Henry Cuellar (incumbent)	62,508	82.1	
Libertarian	Will Alkens	10,153	13.3	
Green	Michael Cary	3,475	4.6	
Majority				
Turnout		76,136	100	
Democratic hold		Swing		

=== 2016 election ===
US House election, 2016: Texas District 28
Party	Candidate	Votes	%	±%
Democratic	Henry Cuellar (incumbent)	122,086	66.2	
Republican	Zeffen Hardin	57,740	31.3	
Green	Michael Cary	4,616	2.5	
Majority				
Turnout		184,442	100	
Democratic hold		Swing		

=== 2018 election ===
Texas's 28th congressional district, 2018
Party	Candidate	Votes	%
Democratic	Henry Cuellar (incumbent)	117,494	84.4
Libertarian	Arthur Thomas IV	21,732	15.6
Total votes		139,226	100
Democratic hold			

=== 2020 election ===
Texas's 28th congressional district, 2020
Party	Candidate	Votes	%
Democratic	Henry Cuellar (incumbent)	137,494	58.3
Republican	Sandra Whitten	91,925	39.0
Libertarian	Bekah Congdon	6,425	2.7
Total votes		235,844	100.0
Democratic hold			

=== 2022 election ===
Texas's 28th congressional district, 2022
Party	Candidate	Votes	%
Democratic	Henry Cuellar (incumbent)	93,803	56.65
Republican	Cassy Garcia	71,778	43.35
Total votes		165,581	100.0
Democratic hold			

=== 2024 election ===
Texas's 28th congressional district, 2024
Party	Candidate	Votes	%	±%
Democratic	Henry Cuellar (incumbent)	125,490	52.81	−3.84
Republican	Jay Furman	112,117	47.19	+3.84
Total votes		237,607	100.0	
Democratic hold				

== See also ==
- List of United States congressional districts
