= Texas's 30th congressional district =

U.S. House district for Texas

Coordinates: 32°39′32″N 96°47′58″W

- Interactive map of district boundaries
- Representative: Jasmine Crockett; D–Dallas
- Distribution: 98.56% urban; 1.44% rural
- Population (2025): 788,443
- Median household income: $79,804
- Ethnicity: 40.0% Black; 36.0% Hispanic; 17.7% White; 3.3% Asian; 2.4% Two or more races; 0.7% other
- Cook PVI: D+25

Texas's 30th congressional district of the United States House of Representatives covers much of the city of Dallas and other parts of Dallas and Tarrant counties (primarily black- and Hispanic-majority areas). The district contains the University of North Texas at Dallas, UNT Law, and Texas Woman's University at Dallas. The 30th district is also home to Dallas Love Field airport and University of Texas Southwestern Medical Center.

The current Representative from the 30th district is Democrat Jasmine Crockett, who has represented the district since 2023. She succeeded longtime representative Eddie Bernice Johnson, who had served since 1993.

With a Cook Partisan Voting Index rating of D+25, it is one of the most Democratic districts in Texas.

== Recent election results from statewide races ==
=== 2023–2027 boundaries ===
Year	Office	Results
2008	President	Obama 76% - 23%
2012	President	Obama 78% - 22%
2014	Senate	Alameel 75% - 25%
2014	Governor	Davis 77% - 23%
2016	President	Clinton 77% - 20%
2018	Senate	O'Rourke 80% - 19%
2018	Governor	Valdez 74% - 24%
2018	Lt. Governor	Collier 77% - 21%
2018	Attorney General	Nelson 78% - 20%
2018	Comptroller of Public Accounts	Chevalier 75% - 21%
2020	President	Biden 78% - 21%
2020	Senate	Hegar 75% - 23%
2022	Governor	O'Rourke 77% - 22%
2022	Lt. Governor	Collier 76% - 21%
2022	Attorney General	Mercedes Garza 76% - 21%
2022	Comptroller of Public Accounts	Dudding 74% - 23%
2024	President	Harris 73% - 26%
2024	Senate	Allred 75% - 23%

=== 2027–2033 boundaries ===
Year	Office	Results
2008	President	Obama 76% - 24%
2012	President	Obama 78% - 22%
2014	Senate	Alameel 75% - 25%
2014	Governor	Davis 76% - 24%
2016	President	Clinton 77% - 21%
2018	Senate	O'Rourke 80% - 20%
2018	Governor	Valdez 74% - 24%
2018	Lt. Governor	Collier 77% - 21%
2018	Attorney General	Nelson 78% - 20%
2018	Comptroller of Public Accounts	Chevalier 76% - 20%
2020	President	Biden 78% - 21%
2020	Senate	Hegar 75% - 22%
2022	Governor	O'Rourke 77% - 22%
2022	Lt. Governor	Collier 76% - 21%
2022	Attorney General	Mercedes Garza 76% - 22%
2022	Comptroller of Public Accounts	Dudding 74% - 23%
2024	President	Harris 73% - 26%
2024	Senate	Allred 75% - 23%
2026	Senate	Talarico 82% - 15%
2026	Governor	Hinojosa 81% - 18%

== Composition ==
For the 118th and successive Congresses (based on redistricting following the 2020 census), the district contains all or portions of the following counties and communities:

Dallas County (12)

Bear Creek Ranch, Cedar Hill (part; also 6th; shared with Ellis County), Dallas (part; also 3rd, 4th, 5th, 6th, 24th, 32nd, and 33rd; shared with Collin, Denton, Kaufman, and Rockwall counties), DeSoto, Duncanville, Ferris (part; also 6th; shared with Ellis County), Glenn Heights (part; also 6th; shared with Ellis County), Grand Prairie (part; also 6th and 33rd; shared with Ellis and Tarrant counties), Hutchins, Lancaster, Ovilla (part; also 6th; shared with Ellis County), Wilmer

Tarrant County (2)

Arlington (part; also 25th and 33rd), Grand Prairie (part; also 6th and 33rd; shared with Dallas and Ellis counties)

== List of members representing the district ==
Member (Residency)	Party	Years	Cong ress	Electoral history	District location
District established January 3, 1993
Eddie Bernice Johnson (Dallas)	Democratic	January 3, 1993 – January 3, 2023	103rd 104th 105th 106th 107th 108th 109th 110th 111th 112th 113th 114th 115th 116th 117th	Elected in 1992. Re-elected in 1994. Re-elected in 1996. Re-elected in 1998. Re-elected in 2000. Re-elected in 2002. Re-elected in 2004. Re-elected in 2006. Re-elected in 2008. Re-elected in 2010. Re-elected in 2012. Re-elected in 2014. Re-elected in 2016. Re-elected in 2018. Re-elected in 2020. Retired.	1993–1997; Parts of Collin, Dallas, and Tarrant
Eddie Bernice Johnson (Dallas)	Democratic	January 3, 1993 – January 3, 2023	103rd 104th 105th 106th 107th 108th 109th 110th 111th 112th 113th 114th 115th 116th 117th	Elected in 1992. Re-elected in 1994. Re-elected in 1996. Re-elected in 1998. Re-elected in 2000. Re-elected in 2002. Re-elected in 2004. Re-elected in 2006. Re-elected in 2008. Re-elected in 2010. Re-elected in 2012. Re-elected in 2014. Re-elected in 2016. Re-elected in 2018. Re-elected in 2020. Retired.	1997–2003; Parts of Dallas
Eddie Bernice Johnson (Dallas)	Democratic	January 3, 1993 – January 3, 2023	103rd 104th 105th 106th 107th 108th 109th 110th 111th 112th 113th 114th 115th 116th 117th	Elected in 1992. Re-elected in 1994. Re-elected in 1996. Re-elected in 1998. Re-elected in 2000. Re-elected in 2002. Re-elected in 2004. Re-elected in 2006. Re-elected in 2008. Re-elected in 2010. Re-elected in 2012. Re-elected in 2014. Re-elected in 2016. Re-elected in 2018. Re-elected in 2020. Retired.	2003–2005; Parts of Dallas
Eddie Bernice Johnson (Dallas)	Democratic	January 3, 1993 – January 3, 2023	103rd 104th 105th 106th 107th 108th 109th 110th 111th 112th 113th 114th 115th 116th 117th	Elected in 1992. Re-elected in 1994. Re-elected in 1996. Re-elected in 1998. Re-elected in 2000. Re-elected in 2002. Re-elected in 2004. Re-elected in 2006. Re-elected in 2008. Re-elected in 2010. Re-elected in 2012. Re-elected in 2014. Re-elected in 2016. Re-elected in 2018. Re-elected in 2020. Retired.	2005–2013 Parts of Dallas
Eddie Bernice Johnson (Dallas)	Democratic	January 3, 1993 – January 3, 2023	103rd 104th 105th 106th 107th 108th 109th 110th 111th 112th 113th 114th 115th 116th 117th	Elected in 1992. Re-elected in 1994. Re-elected in 1996. Re-elected in 1998. Re-elected in 2000. Re-elected in 2002. Re-elected in 2004. Re-elected in 2006. Re-elected in 2008. Re-elected in 2010. Re-elected in 2012. Re-elected in 2014. Re-elected in 2016. Re-elected in 2018. Re-elected in 2020. Retired.	2013–2023 Parts of Dallas
Jasmine Crockett (Dallas)	Democratic	January 3, 2023 – present	118th 119th	Elected in 2022. Re-elected in 2024. Redistricted to the 33rd district but choose to retire to run for U.S. Senate.	2023–2027 Parts of Dallas and Tarrant
Frederick Haynes III (Dallas)	Democratic	Assuming office on January 3, 2027		Elected in 2026.	

== Recent election results ==
=== 2004 ===
US House election, 2004: Texas District 30
Party	Candidate	Votes	%	±%
Democratic	Eddie Bernice Johnson (incumbent)	144,513	93.0	+18.8
Libertarian	John Davis	10,821	7.0	+5.4
Majority		133,692	86.1	
Turnout		155,334		
Democratic hold		Swing	+21.5	

=== 2006 ===
The 2006 congressional race for Texas' 30th district was between long-time incumbent Eddie Bernice Johnson, GOP backed long-time district resident Wilson Aurbach, and Libertarian Ken Ashby.

US House election, 2006: Texas District 30
Party	Candidate	Votes	%	±%
Democratic	Eddie Bernice Johnson (incumbent)	81,212	80.2	−12.8
Republican	Wilson Aurbach	17,820	17.6	N/A
Libertarian	Ken Ashby	2,245	2.2	−4.8
Majority		63,392	62.7	
Turnout		101,277		
Democratic hold		Swing		

=== 2008 ===
US House election, 2008: Texas District 30
Party	Candidate	Votes	%	±%
Democratic	Eddie Bernice Johnson (incumbent)	168,249	82.5	+2.3
Republican	Fred Wood	32,361	15.9	−1.7
Libertarian	Jarrett Woods	3,366	1.6	−0.6
Majority		135,888	66.6	
Turnout		203,976		
Democratic hold		Swing		

=== 2010 ===
US House election, 2010: Texas District 30
Party	Candidate	Votes	%	±%
Democratic	Eddie Bernice Johnson (incumbent)	86,322	75.7	−6.8
Republican	Stephen Broden	24,668	21.6	+5.7
Libertarian	J.B. Oswalt	2,988	2.7	+1.1
Majority		61,654	54.1	
Turnout		113,978		
Democratic hold		Swing		

=== 2012 ===
US House election, 2012: Texas District 30
Party	Candidate	Votes	%	±%
Democratic	Eddie Bernice Johnson (incumbent)	171,059	78.8	+3.1
Republican	Travis Washington Jr.	41,222	19.0	−2.6
Libertarian	Ed Rankin	4,733	2.2	−0.5
Majority		129,837	59.8	
Turnout		217,014		
Democratic hold		Swing		

=== 2014 ===
US House election, 2014: Texas District 30
Party	Candidate	Votes	%	±%
Democratic	Eddie Bernice Johnson (incumbent)	93,041	88.0	+9.2
Libertarian	Max W. Koch III	7,154	6.8	+4.6
Independent	Eric LeMonte Williams	5,598	5.2	N/A
Majority		85,887	81.2	
Turnout		105,793		
Democratic hold		Swing		

=== 2016 ===
US House election, 2016: Texas District 30
Party	Candidate	Votes	%	±%
Democratic	Eddie Bernice Johnson (incumbent)	170,502	77.9	−10.1
Republican	Charles Lingerfelt	41,518	19.0	N/A
Libertarian	Jarrett R. Woods	4,753	2.2	−4.6
Green	Thom Prentice	2,053	0.9	N/A
Majority		128,984	59.0	
Turnout		218,826		
Democratic hold		Swing		

=== 2018 ===
US House election, 2018: Texas District 30
Party	Candidate	Votes	%	±%
Democratic	Eddie Bernice Johnson (incumbent)	166,784	91.1	+13.2
Libertarian	Shawn Jones	16,390	8.9	+6.7
Majority		150,394	82.1	
Turnout		183,174		
Democratic hold		Swing		

=== 2020 ===
2020 United States House of Representatives elections in Texas: Texas District 30
Party	Candidate	Votes	%	±%
Democratic	Eddie Bernice Johnson (incumbent)	204,664	77.5	−13.6
Republican	Tre Pennie	48,608	18.4	N/A
Independent	Eric LeMonte Williams	10,834	4.1	N/A
Majority		156,056	59.1	
Turnout		264,106		
Democratic hold		Swing		

=== 2022 ===
2022 United States House of Representatives elections in Texas: Texas District 30
Party	Candidate	Votes	%	±%
Democratic	Jasmine Crockett	134,876	74.7	−2.8
Republican	James Rodgers	39,209	21.7	+3.3
Independent	Zachariah Manning	3,820	2.1	N/A
Libertarian	Phil Gray	1,870	1.0	N/A
Write-in	Debbie Walker	738	0.41	N/A
Total votes		180,513	100.0	
Democratic hold		Swing		

=== 2024 ===
2024 United States House of Representatives elections in Texas: Texas District 30
Party	Candidate	Votes	%	±%
Democratic	Jasmine Crockett	197,650	84.9	
Libertarian	Jrmar Jefferson	35,175	15.1	
Total votes		232,825	100.00	
Democratic hold				

== Historical district boundaries ==
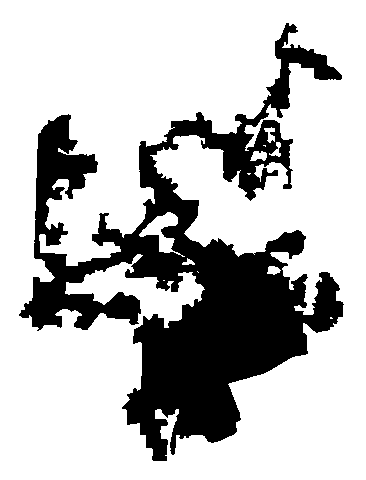
1991–1996; struck down in Bush v. Vera

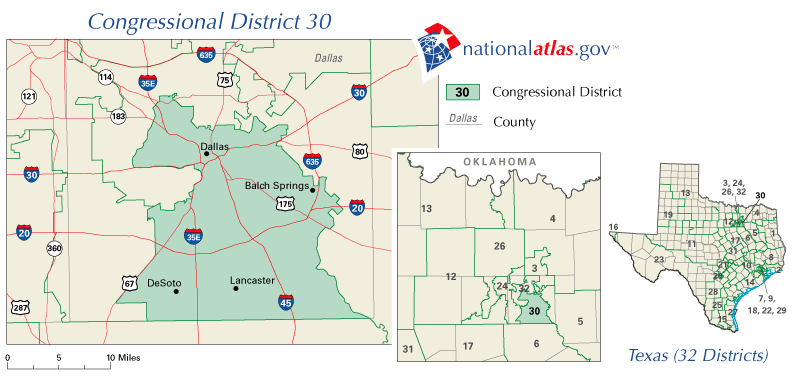
2007–2013

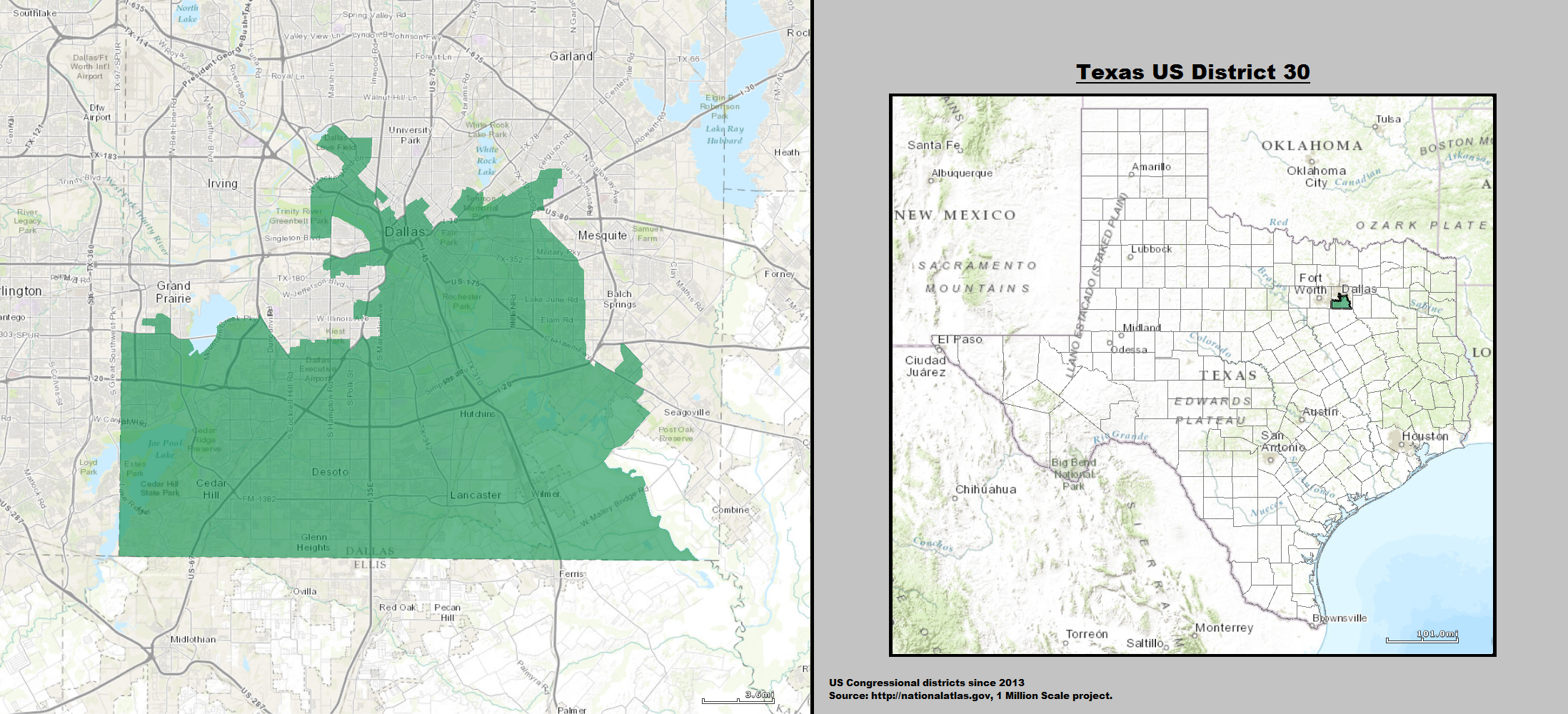
2013–2023

== In popular culture ==
- The 30th congressional district plays a role in the first part of season 4 of House Of Cards. Claire Underwood seeks to run for the seat after a disagreement with her husband, the President. The predominantly black and Hispanic district is reluctant to back Claire, and she eventually backs down.

== See also ==
- List of United States congressional districts
