= Texas's 33rd congressional district =

U.S. House district for Texas

Coordinates: 32.7700°N 96.7800°W

- Interactive map of district boundaries
- Representative: Marc Veasey; D–Fort Worth
- Distribution: 99.98% urban; 0.02% rural
- Population (2025): 820,162
- Median household income: $68,840
- Ethnicity: 57.6% Hispanic; 18.6% Black; 13.2% White; 8.1% Asian; 1.8% Two or more races; 0.6% other
- Cook PVI: D+19

Texas's 33rd congressional district is a district that was created as a result of the 2010 census. The first candidates ran in the 2012 House elections, and were seated for the 113th United States Congress.

Texas's 33rd congressional district serves most of the majority-Hispanic precincts in Dallas County and most of the majority-Black and Hispanic precincts in Tarrant County. In Dallas County, the district covers parts of Dallas, Irving, Grand Prairie, Farmers Branch, Carrollton and all of Cockrell Hill. In Tarrant County, the district includes parts of Arlington, Forest Hill, Fort Worth, Grand Prairie, Haltom City, Saginaw and Sansom Park, and all of Everman.

It is currently represented by Democrat Marc Veasey.

== Recent election results from statewide races ==
=== 2023–2027 boundaries ===
Year	Office	Results
2008	President	Obama 70% - 29%
2012	President	Obama 73% - 27%
2014	Senate	Alameel 69% - 31%
2014	Governor	Davis 71% - 29%
2016	President	Clinton 74% - 22%
2018	Senate	O'Rourke 79% - 21%
2018	Governor	Valdez 73% - 25%
2018	Lt. Governor	Collier 76% - 22%
2018	Attorney General	Nelson 76% - 21%
2018	Comptroller of Public Accounts	Chevalier 74% - 22%
2020	President	Biden 74% - 24%
2020	Senate	Hegar 71% - 26%
2022	Governor	O'Rourke 73% - 26%
2022	Lt. Governor	Collier 72% - 25%
2022	Attorney General	Mercedes Garza 72% - 25%
2022	Comptroller of Public Accounts	Dudding 69% - 27%
2024	President	Harris 66% - 32%
2024	Senate	Allred 69% - 28%

=== 2027–2033 boundaries ===
Year	Office	Results
2008	President	Obama 65% - 34%
2012	President	Obama 66% - 35%
2014	Senate	Alameel 62% - 38%
2014	Governor	Davis 66% - 34%
2016	President	Clinton 70% - 26%
2018	Senate	O'Rourke 75% - 24%
2018	Governor	Valdez 68% - 29%
2018	Lt. Governor	Collier 72% - 26%
2018	Attorney General	Nelson 73% - 25%
2018	Comptroller of Public Accounts	Chevalier 69% - 27%
2020	President	Biden 72% - 27%
2020	Senate	Hegar 68% - 29%
2022	Governor	O'Rourke 71% - 27%
2022	Lt. Governor	Collier 70% - 26%
2022	Attorney General	Mercedes Garza 71% - 26%
2022	Comptroller of Public Accounts	Dudding 66% - 30%
2024	President	Harris 65% - 33%
2024	Senate	Allred 69% - 29%
2026	Senate	Talarico 79% - 19%
2026	Governor	Hinojosa 77% - 22%

== Current composition ==
For the 118th and successive Congresses (based on redistricting following the 2020 census), the district contains all or portions of the following counties and communities:

Dallas County (6)

Carrollton (part; also 24th, 26th, and 32nd; shared with Denton County), Cockrell Hill, Dallas (part; also 3rd, 4th, 5th, 6th, 24th, 30th, and 32nd; shared with Collin, Denton, Kaufman, and Rockwall counties), Farmers Branch (part; also 24th and 32nd), Grand Prairie (part; also 6th and 30th; shared with Ellis and Tarrant counties), Irving (part; also 6th and 24th)

Tarrant County (6)

Arlington (part; also 6th, 25th, and 30th), Everman, Forest Hill (part; also 25th), Fort Worth (part; also 12th, 24th, 25th, and 26th; shared with Denton, Johnson, Parker, and Wise counties), Grand Prairie (part; also 6th and 25th; shared with Dallas and Ellis counties), Saginaw (part; also 12th)

== Future composition ==
Beginning with the 2026 election, the 33rd district will consist of the following counties:

- Dallas (part)

== List of members representing the district ==
Member	Party	Years	Cong ress	Electoral history	Counties represented
District established January 3, 2013
Marc Veasey (Fort Worth)	Democratic	January 3, 2013 – present	113th 114th 115th 116th 117th 118th 119th	Elected in 2012. Re-elected in 2014. Re-elected in 2016. Re-elected in 2018. Re-elected in 2020. Re-elected in 2022. Re-elected in 2024. Redistricted to the 25th district.	2013–2023 Parts of Dallas and Tarrant
Marc Veasey (Fort Worth)	Democratic	January 3, 2013 – present	113th 114th 115th 116th 117th 118th 119th	Elected in 2012. Re-elected in 2014. Re-elected in 2016. Re-elected in 2018. Re-elected in 2020. Re-elected in 2022. Re-elected in 2024. Redistricted to the 25th district.	2023–present Parts of Dallas and Tarrant
Colin Allred (Dallas)	Democratic	Assuming office on January 3, 2027		Elected in 2026.	

== Election results ==
=== 2012 election ===
Marc Veasey and Domingo García took the top two spots in the May 29, 2012, Democratic Primary. Veasey won the runoff on July 31 to determine who would face the Republican nominee, Chuck Bradley, in the general election. Veasey won the general election and was seated in the new district.

2012 Texas's 33rd congressional district election
Party	Candidate	Votes	%	±%
Democratic	Marc Veasey	85,114	72.51%	N/A
Republican	Chuck Bradley	30,252	25.77%	N/A
Green	Ed Lindsay	2,009	1.71%	N/A
Total votes		117,375	100.00%	
Democratic win (new seat)				

=== 2014 election ===
2014 Texas's 33rd congressional district election
Party	Candidate	Votes	%	±%
Democratic	Marc Veasey (incumbent)	43,769	86.51%	+14.00
Libertarian	Jason Reeves	6,823	13.49%	N/A
Total votes		50,592	100.00%	
Democratic hold				

=== 2016 election ===
2016 Texas's 33rd congressional district election
Party	Candidate	Votes	%	±%
Democratic	Marc Veasey (incumbent)	93,147	73.71%	–12.80
Republican	M. Mark Mitchell	33,222	26.29%	N/A
Total votes		126,369	100.00%	
Democratic hold				

=== 2018 election ===
2018 Texas's 33rd congressional district election
Party	Candidate	Votes	%	±%
Democratic	Marc Veasey (incumbent)	90,805	76.16%	+2.45
Republican	Willie Billups	26,120	21.91%	–4.38
Libertarian	Jason Reeves	2,299	1.93%	N/A
Total votes		119,224	100.00%	
Democratic hold				

=== 2020 election ===
2020 Texas's 33rd congressional district election
Party	Candidate	Votes	%	±%
Democratic	Marc Veasey (incumbent)	105,317	66.82%	–9.34
Republican	Fabian Vasquez	39,638	25.15%	+3.24
Independent	Carlos Quintanilla	8,071	5.12%	N/A
Libertarian	Jason Reeves	2,586	1.64%	–0.29
Independent	Rene Welton	1,994	1.26%	N/A
Total votes		157,606	100.00%	
Democratic hold				

=== 2022 election ===
2022 Texas's 33rd congressional district election
Party	Candidate	Votes	%	±%
Democratic	Marc Veasey (incumbent)	82,081	71.98%	+5.16
Republican	Patrick Gillespie	29,203	25.61%	−0.46
Libertarian	Ken Ashby	2,746	2.41%	+0.77
Total votes		114,030	100.00%	
Democratic hold				

=== 2024 election ===
2024 Texas's 33rd congressional district election
Party	Candidate	Votes	%
Democratic	Marc Veasey (incumbent)	113,461	68.7
Republican	Patrick Gillespie	51,607	31.3
Total votes		165,068	100.0
Democratic hold			
