= Texas's 32nd congressional district =

U.S. House district for Texas

Coordinates: 32°55′13″N 96°39′13″W

- Interactive map of district boundaries
- Representative: Julie Johnson; D–Farmers Branch
- Distribution: 99.85% urban; 0.15% rural
- Population (2025): 754,309
- Median household income: $75,539
- Ethnicity: 36.4% Hispanic; 32.2% White; 19.2% Black; 8.4% Asian; 3.0% Two or more races; 0.7% other
- Cook PVI: D+13

Texas's 32nd congressional district of the United States House of Representatives serves a suburban area of northeastern Dallas County and a sliver of Collin and Denton counties. The district was created after the 2000 United States census, when Texas went from 30 seats to 32 seats. It was then modified in 2011 after the 2010 census. The current representative is Democrat Julie Johnson.

Prior to 2022 redistricting, the district included part of the North Dallas neighborhood of Preston Hollow, which has been the home of George W. Bush since the end of his presidency. While it previously contained much of the Western Dallas County area, including Irving, since the 2011–2012 redistricting cycle, the district now covers mostly the Northern and Eastern Dallas County areas, and a small portion of Collin County.

In 2018, civil rights attorney and former NFL player Colin Allred won a heavily contested primary for the Democratic nomination, and defeated Republican incumbent Pete Sessions in the November 6 election. The district, like most suburban districts in Texas, had long been considered solidly Republican. However, its pre-2022 configuration was considered more of a swing district as a result of changing demographics, along with antipathy towards former President Donald Trump in suburban areas. After 2022, the district was reconfigured to be solidly Democratic to protect Republicans in adjacent districts, re-electing Allred with over 60% of the vote.

== Recent election results from statewide races ==
=== 2023–2027 boundaries ===
Year	Office	Results
2008	President	Obama 56% - 44%
2012	President	Obama 56% - 44%
2014	Senate	Cornyn 50.4% - 49.6%
2014	Governor	Davis 55% - 45%
2016	President	Clinton 60% - 34%
2018	Senate	O'Rourke 67% - 33%
2018	Governor	Valdez 59% - 39%
2018	Lt. Governor	Collier 63% - 34%
2018	Attorney General	Nelson 64% - 33%
2018	Comptroller of Public Accounts	Chevalier 60% - 36%
2020	President	Biden 66% - 33%
2020	Senate	Hegar 61% - 36%
2022	Governor	O'Rourke 64% - 34%
2022	Lt. Governor	Collier 64% - 33%
2022	Attorney General	Mercedes Garza 64% - 33%
2022	Comptroller of Public Accounts	Dudding 59% - 37%
2024	President	Harris 60% - 37%
2024	Senate	Allred 64% - 34%

=== 2027–2033 boundaries ===
Year	Office	Results
2008	President	McCain 60% - 39%
2012	President	Romney 64% - 36%
2014	Senate	Cornyn 70% - 30%
2014	Governor	Abbott 66% - 34%
2016	President	Trump 56% - 39%
2018	Senate	Cruz 54% - 45%
2018	Governor	Abbott 59% - 39%
2018	Lt. Governor	Patrick 54% - 43%
2018	Attorney General	Paxton 54% - 44%
2018	Comptroller of Public Accounts	Hegar 57% - 40%
2020	President	Trump 54% - 44%
2020	Senate	Cornyn 56% - 41%
2022	Governor	Abbott 57% - 41%
2022	Lt. Governor	Patrick 56% - 42%
2022	Attorney General	Paxton 55% - 42%
2022	Comptroller of Public Accounts	Hegar 60% - 38%
2024	President	Trump 58% - 40%
2024	Senate	Cruz 55% - 43%
2026	Senate	Talarico 50% - 46%
2026	Governor	Abbott 50% - 48%

== Current composition ==
For the 118th and successive Congresses (based on redistricting following the 2020 census), the district contains all or portions of the following counties and communities:

Collin County (2)

Dallas (part; also 3rd, 4th, 5th, 6th, 24th, 30th, and 33rd; shared with Dallas, Denton, Kaufman, and Rockwall counties), Richardson (part; also 24th; shared with Dallas County)

Dallas County (8)

Addison (part; also 24th), Balch Springs, Carrollton (part; also 24th, 26th, and 33rd; shared with Denton County), Dallas (part; also 3rd, 4th, 5th, 6th, 24th, 30th, and 33rd; shared with Collin, Denton, Kaufman, and Rockwall counties), Farmers Branch (part; also 24th and 33rd), Garland (part; also 5th), Mesquite (part; also 5th), Richardson (part; also 24th; shared with Collin County)

Denton County (2)

Carrollton (part; also 24th and 26th and; shared with Dallas County), Dallas (part; also 3rd, 4th, 5th, 6th, 24th, 30th, and 33rd; shared with Collin, Dallas, Kaufman, and Rockwall counties)

== Future composition ==
Beginning with the 2026 election, the 32nd district will consist of the following counties:

- Camp
- Collin (part)
- Dallas (part)
- Hunt (part)
- Rains
- Rockwall
- Upshur
- Wood

== List of members representing the district ==
Member	Party	Years	Cong ess	Electoral history	Counties represented
District established January 3, 2003
Pete Sessions (Dallas)	Republican	January 3, 2003 – January 3, 2019	108th 109th 110th 111th 112th 113th 114th 115th	Redistricted from the 5th district and re-elected in 2002. Re-elected in 2004. Re-elected in 2006. Re-elected in 2008. Re-elected in 2010. Re-elected in 2012. Re-elected in 2014. Re-elected in 2016. Lost re-election.	2003–2005 Southeastern Collin, Northeastern Dallas
Pete Sessions (Dallas)	Republican	January 3, 2003 – January 3, 2019	108th 109th 110th 111th 112th 113th 114th 115th	Redistricted from the 5th district and re-elected in 2002. Re-elected in 2004. Re-elected in 2006. Re-elected in 2008. Re-elected in 2010. Re-elected in 2012. Re-elected in 2014. Re-elected in 2016. Lost re-election.	2005–2013 Southeastern Collin, Northeastern Dallas
Pete Sessions (Dallas)	Republican	January 3, 2003 – January 3, 2019	108th 109th 110th 111th 112th 113th 114th 115th	Redistricted from the 5th district and re-elected in 2002. Re-elected in 2004. Re-elected in 2006. Re-elected in 2008. Re-elected in 2010. Re-elected in 2012. Re-elected in 2014. Re-elected in 2016. Lost re-election.	2013–2023 Southeastern Collin, Northeastern Dallas
Colin Allred (Dallas)	Democratic	January 3, 2019 – January 3, 2025	116th 117th 118th	Elected in 2018. Re-elected in 2020. Re-elected in 2022. Retired to run for U.S. Senator.	2013–2023 Southeastern Collin, Northeastern Dallas
Colin Allred (Dallas)	Democratic	January 3, 2019 – January 3, 2025	116th 117th 118th	Elected in 2018. Re-elected in 2020. Re-elected in 2022. Retired to run for U.S. Senator.	2023–2027 Southern Collin, Northeastern Dallas, and Southeastern Denton
Julie Johnson (Farmers Branch)	Democratic	January 3, 2025 – present	119th	Elected in 2024. Redistricted to the 33rd district and lost renomination.	2023–2027 Southern Collin, Northeastern Dallas, and Southeastern Denton
Jace Yarbrough	Republican	Assuming office on January 3, 2027		Elected in 2026.	

== Recent elections ==
=== 2004 ===
In the 2004 election, Martin Frost, the Democratic representative from Texas's 24th congressional district, who had been redistricted out of his district in Fort Worth, Arlington, and parts of Dallas, decided to run against Sessions rather than challenge Kenny Marchant or Joe Barton. Sessions benefited from President George W. Bush's endorsement to win in this Republican-leaning district.

US House election, 2004: Texas District 32
Party	Candidate	Votes	%	±%
Republican	Pete Sessions (incumbent)	109,859	54.3	−14.8
Democratic	Martin Frost	89,030	44.0	+13.7
Libertarian	Michael Needleman	3,347	1.7	+0.6
Majority		20,829	10.3	
Turnout		202,236		
Republican hold		Swing	-14.2	

=== 2006 ===
In 2006, Dallas lawyer (and cousin of U.S. Senator Mark Pryor) Will Pryor unsuccessfully challenged Sessions, and lost by a large margin.

US House election, 2006: Texas District 32
Party	Candidate	Votes	%	±%
Republican	Pete Sessions (incumbent)	71,461	56.4	+2.1
Democratic	Will Pryor	52,269	41.3	−2.7
Libertarian	John B. Hawley	2,922	2.3	+0.6
Majority		19,192	15.1	+4.8
Turnout		126,562		−75,584
Republican hold		Swing	+2.4	

=== 2008 ===
In 2008, Sessions successfully faced a challenge by Democrat Eric Roberson and was reelected to another term.

US House election, 2008: Texas District 32
Party	Candidate	Votes	%	±%
Republican	Pete Sessions (incumbent)	116,165	57.2	+0.8
Democratic	Eric Roberson	82,375	40.6	−0.7
Libertarian	Alex Bischoff	4,410	2.2	−0.1
Majority		33,790	16.6	+1.5
Turnout		202,950		+76,298
Republican hold		Swing	+0.8	

=== 2010 ===
In 2010, Sessions successfully faced a challenge by Democrat Grier Raggio and Libertarian John Jay Myers. Sessions was reelected to another term.

US House election, 2010: Texas District 32
Party	Candidate	Votes	%	±%
Republican	Pete Sessions (incumbent)	79,433	62.6	+5.4
Democratic	Grier Raggio	44,258	34.9	−5.7
Libertarian	John Jay Myers	3,178	2.5	+0.3

=== 2012 ===
In 2012, Sessions successfully faced a challenge by Democrat Katherine Savers McGovern and Libertarian Seth Hollist. Sessions was reelected to his 9th term.

US House election, 2012: Texas District 32
Party	Candidate	Votes	%	±%
Republican	Pete Sessions (incumbent)	146,129	58.29	−4.31
Democratic	Katherine Savers McGovern	98,867	39.44	+4.54
Libertarian	Seth Hollist	5,664	2.25	−0.25

=== 2014 ===
In 2014, Sessions successfully faced a challenge by Democrat Frank Perez and Libertarian Ed Rankin. Sessions was reelected to his 10th term.

US House election, 2014: Texas District 32
Party	Candidate	Votes	%	±%
Republican	Pete Sessions (incumbent)	96,420	61.8	+3.51
Democratic	Frank Perez	55,281	35.4	−4.04
Libertarian	Ed Rankin	4,271	2.7	+0.45
Majority		41,139	26.4	−12.96
Turnout		155,972		−94,688

=== 2016 ===
In 2016, Sessions won an election contested only by third party candidates, as the Democrats did not nominate a challenger. Sessions was reelected to his 11th term.

2016 United States House of Representatives elections in Texas: Texas District 32
Party	Candidate	Votes	%	±%
Republican	Pete Sessions (incumbent)	162,868	71.07	+9.25
Libertarian	Ed Rankin	43,490	18.98	+16.24
Green	Gary Stuard	22,813	9.95	+9.95
Total votes		229,171	100	
Republican hold		Swing		

=== 2018 ===
United States House of Representatives elections in Texas, 2018: District 32
Party	Candidate	Votes	%	±%
Democratic	Colin Allred	144,067	52.27	+52.27
Republican	Pete Sessions (incumbent)	126,101	45.75	−25.32
Libertarian	Melina Baker	5,452	1.98	−17.00
Total votes		275,620	100.0	
Democratic gain from Republican		Swing		

=== 2020 ===
United States House of Representatives elections in Texas, 2020: District 32
Party	Candidate	Votes	%
Democratic	Colin Allred (incumbent)	178,542	52.0
Republican	Genevieve Collins	157,867	45.9
Libertarian	Christy Mowrey Peterson	4,946	1.4
Independent	Jason Sigmon	2,332	0.7
Total votes		343,687	100.0
Democratic hold			

=== 2022 ===
2022 United States House of Representatives elections in Texas: District 32
Party	Candidate	Votes	%
Democratic	Colin Allred (incumbent)	116,005	65.3
Republican	Antonio Swad	61,494	34.6
Total votes		177,499	100.0
Democratic hold			

=== 2024 ===
2024 United States House of Representatives elections in Texas: District 32
Party	Candidate	Votes	%
Democratic	Julie Johnson	140,536	60.45
Republican	Darrell Day	85,941	36.97
Libertarian	Kevin A. Hale	5,987	2.58
Total votes		232,464	100.0
Democratic hold			

== See also ==
- List of United States congressional districts

== Sources ==
- Congressional Biographical Directory of the United States 1774–present
