= Colin Allred =

American politician, lawyer (born 1983)

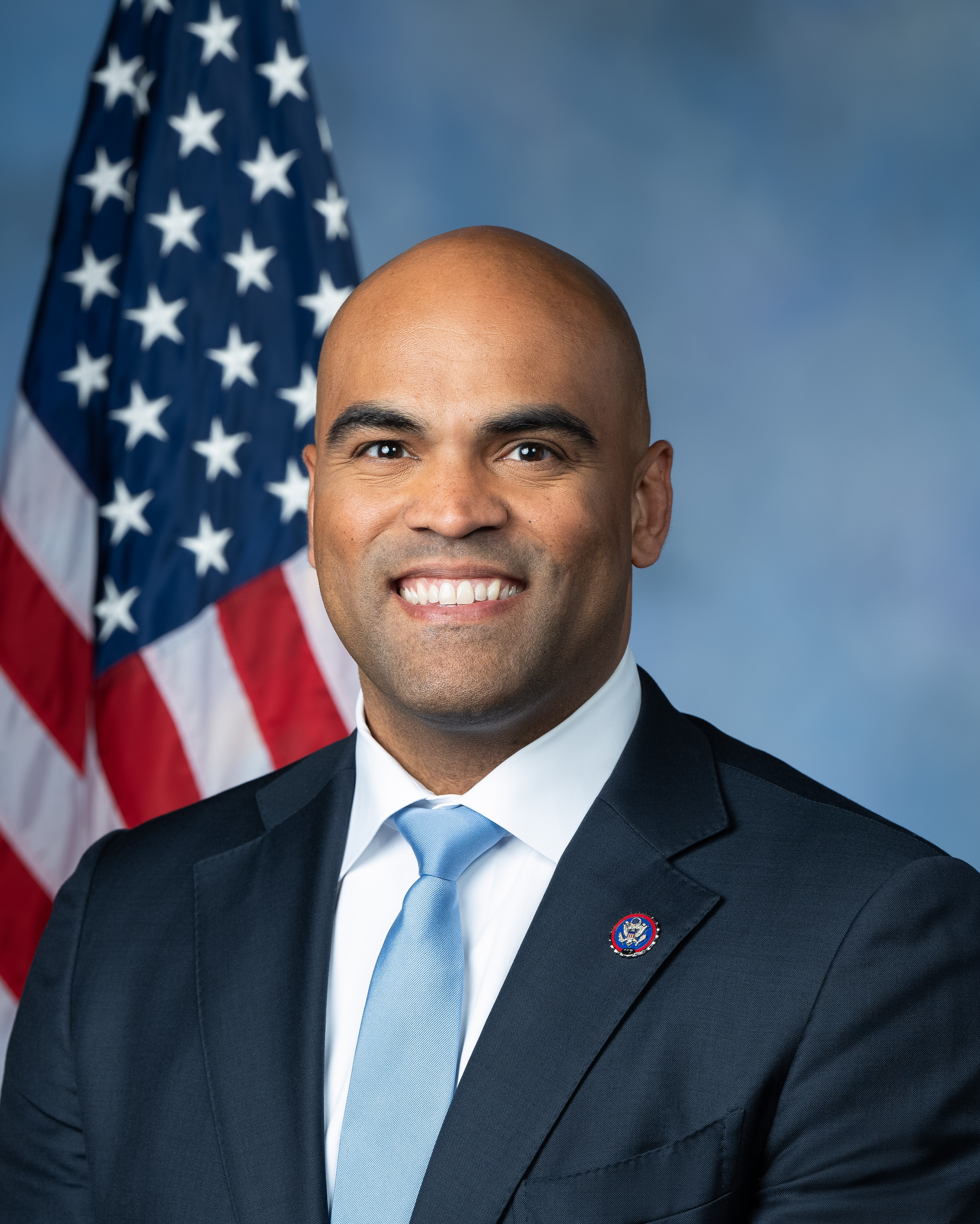
- Official portrait, 2022

Member-elect of the U.S. House of Representatives from Texas
- Assuming office January 3, 2027
- Succeeding: Marc Veasey
- Constituency: 33rd district
- In office January 3, 2019 – January 3, 2025
- Preceded by: Pete Sessions
- Succeeded by: Julie Johnson
- Constituency: 32nd district

Personal details
- Born: Colin Zachary Allred; April 15, 1983 (age 43) Dallas, Texas, U.S.
- Party: Democratic
- Spouse: Alexandra Eber (m. 2017)
- Children: 2
- Education: Baylor University (BA); University of California, Berkeley (JD)
- Football career

No. 56
- Position: Linebacker

Personal information
- Listed height: 6 ft 1 in (1.85 m)
- Listed weight: 242 lb (110 kg)

Career information
- High school: Hillcrest (Dallas, Texas)
- College: Baylor
- NFL draft: 2006: undrafted

Career history
- Tennessee Titans (2006–2010)

Career NFL statistics
- Total tackles: 46
- Stats at Pro Football Reference
- Allred's voice Allred on the 2023 Allen, Texas mall shooting. Recorded May 9, 2023

Colin Zachary Allred (born April 15, 1983) is an American politician, civil rights lawyer, and former professional football player who is the United States representative-elect from Texas's 33rd congressional district. He previously served as the U.S. representative for Texas's 32nd congressional district from 2019 to 2025. The district included the northeastern corner of Dallas as well as many of its northeastern suburbs. He is a member of the Democratic Party.

Before entering politics, Allred was a linebacker who played for the Tennessee Titans of the National Football League (NFL) for four seasons. After being released, he left football to pursue a degree in law. Allred received his J.D. from the University of California, Berkeley. He then held multiple positions in the Obama administration, first at the Department of Housing and Urban Development and later at the Executive Office for United States Attorneys.

Allred was first elected to Congress in 2018, defeating Republican incumbent Pete Sessions. He was re-elected in 2020 and 2022. In 2024, Allred opted to run for Senate instead of re-election to the House, where he was succeeded by Julie Johnson. He won the Democratic nomination but lost to Republican incumbent Ted Cruz in the general election. He ran for Senate again in 2026, but later dropped out to run for his old congressional seat, challenging Johnson in the Democratic primary. He won the nomination in a runoff and defeated Republican nominee Patrick Gillespie in the general election.

== Early life and education ==
Allred was born in Dallas, Texas. He was raised by his mother, Judith Allred, a single mother who was a public school teacher. As of 2024, Allred had never met his father. A fourth-generation Texan, Allred is related to former Texas governor James V. Allred. Allred is biracial; his father is black and his mother is white. Allred attended Hillcrest High School in Dallas, where he played baseball, basketball and football, and served as class president. He earned a scholarship to play college football at Baylor University.

In 2001, Allred began to play for the Baylor Bears as a linebacker under head coach Guy Morriss. In 2005, he was selected as the team captain and defensive MVP. In December 2005, Allred graduated from Baylor with a Bachelor of Arts in history. As a senior, he received All-Big 12 honorable mention from the Associated Press. He was also selected as a first-team Academic All-Big 12 in 2004 and 2005.

== Professional career ==
=== Football ===
Pre-draft measurables
| Height | Weight | 40-yard dash | 20-yard shuttle | Three-cone drill | Vertical jump | Broad jump | Bench press |
|---|---|---|---|---|---|---|---|
| 6 ft 1 1/8 in (1.86 m) | 237 lb (108 kg) | 4.85 s | 4.37 s | 7.33 s | 34.0 in (0.86 m) | 9 ft 7 in (2.92 m) | 17 reps |
All values from Pro Day

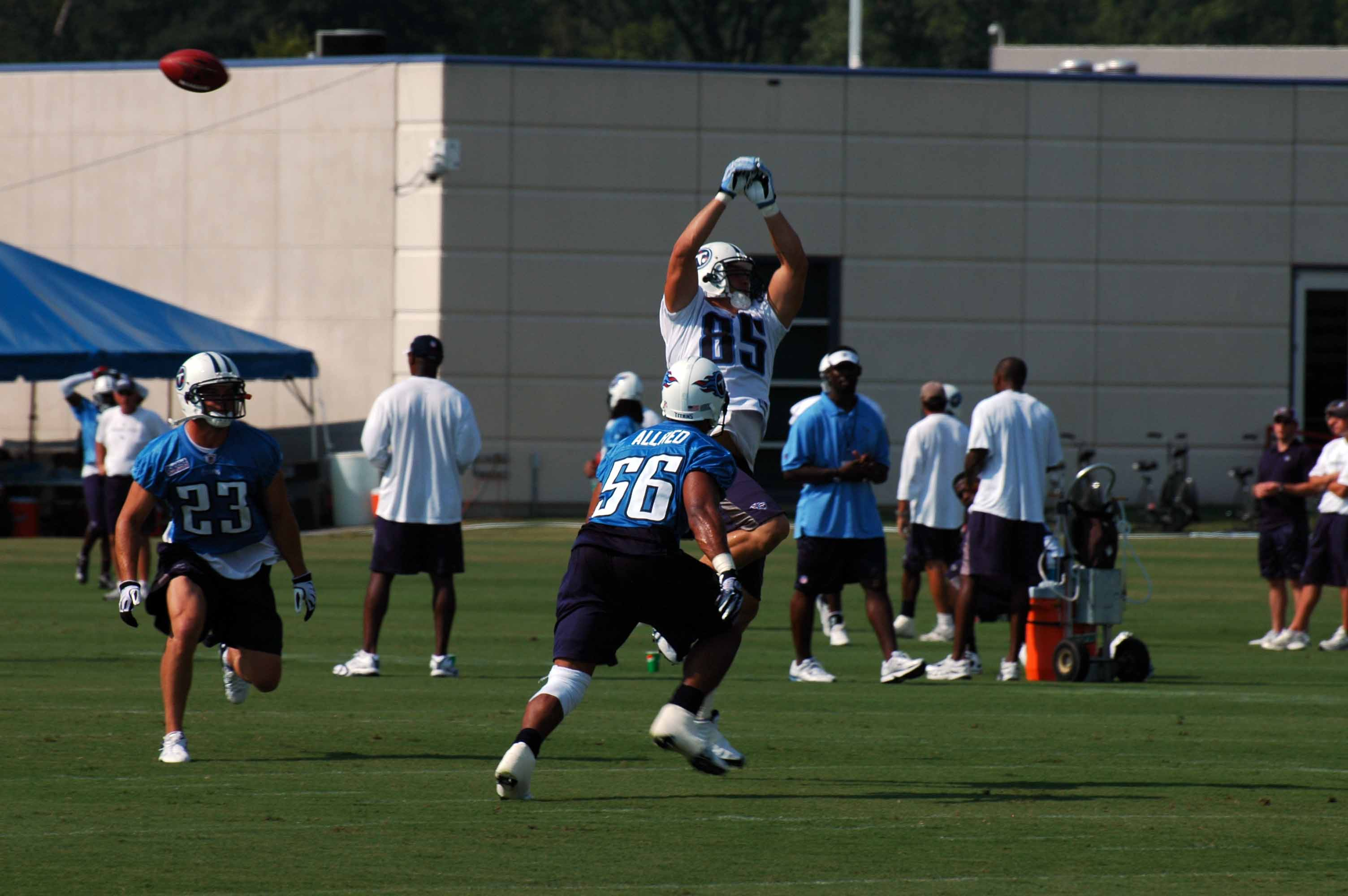
Allred (#56) on a defensive play during Tennessee Titans training camp in 2008

Allred was signed by the Tennessee Titans as an undrafted free agent following the 2006 NFL draft on May 4, 2006. He was waived on August 29 but re-signed on January 26, 2007. Allred was waived again on September 1 during final cuts and signed to the practice squad on September 2.

He was promoted to the active roster as linebacker on December 15 and made his NFL regular season debut on December 16, 2007. In four seasons for the Titans between 2007 and 2010, Allred appeared in 32 games and recorded 46 tackles.

On October 10, 2010, during a Titans game with the Dallas Cowboys, he was severely injured in the neck during a game when he collided with Cowboys player Martellus Bennett. He subsequently decided to retire from football and go to law school, and he became a free agent before the 2011 season without signing with another team.

=== Law ===
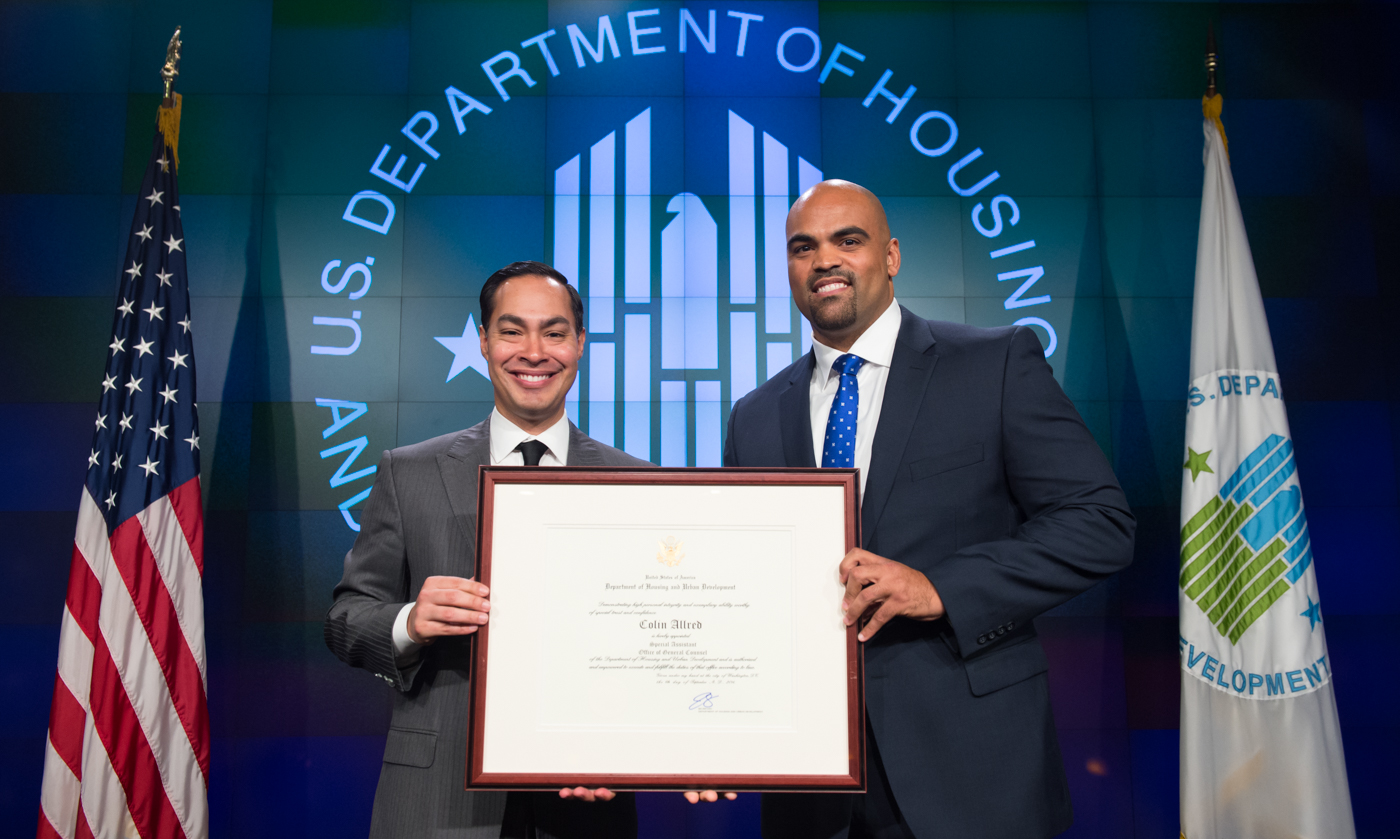
Allred with Secretary Castro in 2016

In 2011, Allred enrolled at the UC Berkeley School of Law. He worked as a research assistant for professor and author Ian Haney López and graduated in 2014 with a Juris Doctor degree.

After graduating from law school, Allred worked for Battleground Texas as its Dallas-Fort Worth Regional Director of Voter Protection, overseeing the state's first coordinated voter protection program. His responsibilities included overseeing the voter registration efforts of volunteers and managing a poll watcher program. In 2016, he worked as a special assistant in the Department of Housing and Urban Development's Office of General Counsel alongside then-Secretary Julian Castro in the Obama administration.

Subsequently, Allred worked as a civil rights attorney at the law firm Perkins Coie, where he was a voting rights litigator and counsel to clients including national and state political candidates and advocacy organizations.

== United States Representative ==
=== Elections ===
==== 2018 ====
2018 election results

On April 21, 2017, Allred announced his campaign to challenge incumbent Republican Pete Sessions in 2018. In a crowded Democratic primary that included two other Obama administration alums, Allred finished first, by 20 points, but did not get 50% of the vote. Thus, in the May 22 runoff election (the final stage of the Democratic primary), Allred defeated Lewisville businesswoman Lillian Salerno, receiving 69.5% of the vote.

Allred then faced Sessions in the general election. As of November 2016, this was considered a swing district because Democratic presidential candidate Hillary Clinton received marginally more votes than Donald Trump even as Sessions was reelected with no major-party opposition. Allred described himself as a moderate Democrat. U.S. representative John Lewis rallied in support of Allred in October.

On November 6, 2018, Allred was elected to the House of Representatives for the 32nd district of Texas. His victory was considered an upset because Sessions had been in Congress since 1997 and represented the 32nd district since its creation in 2003. Allred became the second person to represent this district and the first Democrat. Sessions had represented the neighboring 5th district, and transferred to the 32nd after the 5th was seemingly made less Republican in redistricting. As a measure of how Republican this area had been, much of what is now the 32nd had not been represented by a Democrat since 1968, when it was part of the neighboring 3rd district.

Allred was one of two former NFL players to win a seat in Congress that year, along with Anthony Gonzalez.

==== 2020 ====
Allred was reelected in 2020, defeating Republican Genevieve Collins by 20,675 votes.

==== 2022 ====
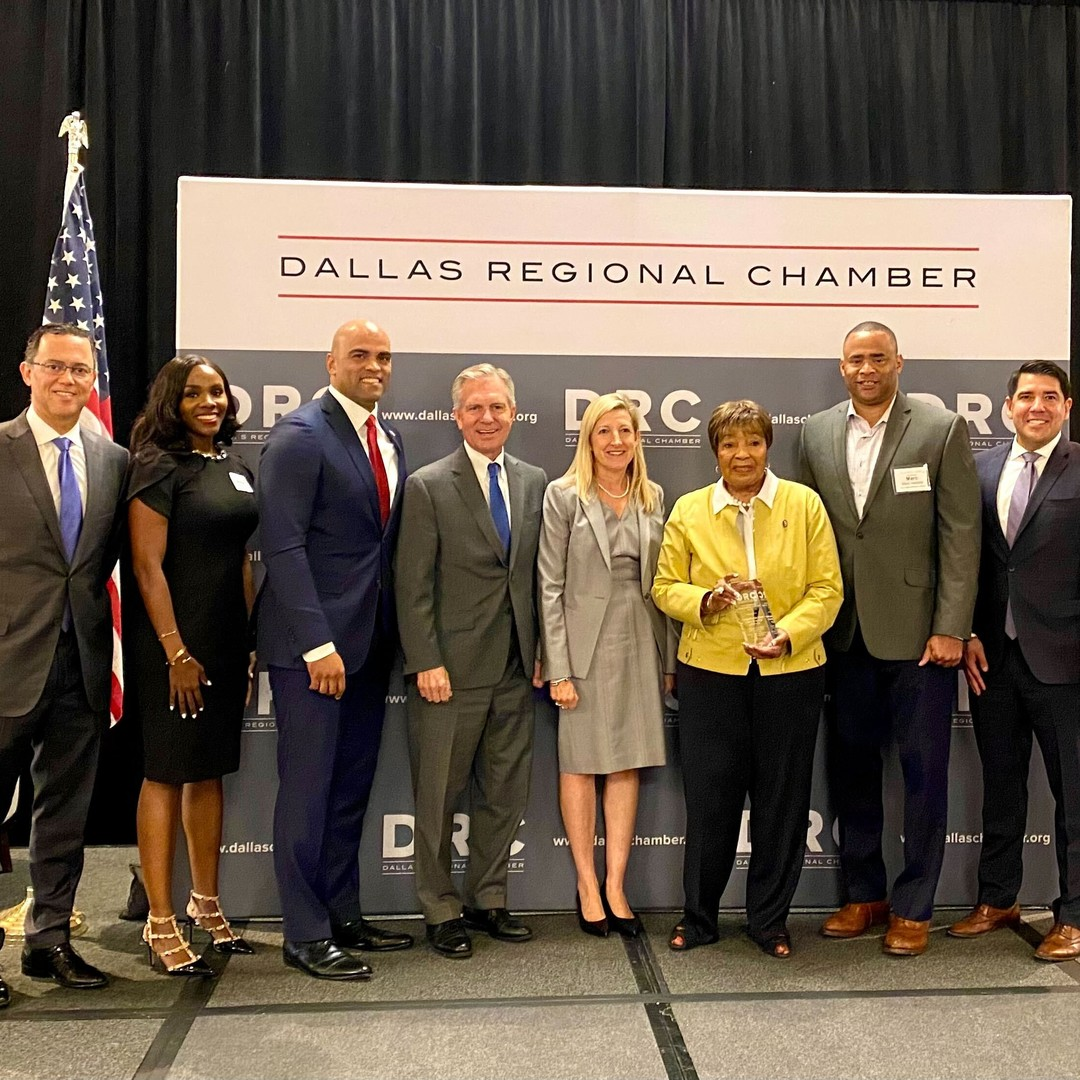
Allred meeting with the Dallas Chamber of Commerce to discuss the Inflation Reduction bill in 2022

Allred was reelected in 2022, defeating Republican Antonio Swad by 54,511 votes.

The United States Chamber of Commerce, which often backs Republican candidates, endorsed Allred, a Democrat, in the 2022 House election.

==== 2026 ====
Allred originally ran for Texas's other senate seat in 2026, but dropped out in December 2025, and announced he would seek the Democratic nomination for Texas's 33rd congressional district. He won the Democratic nomination after a May runoff, defeating his successor in the 32nd District, Julie Johnson.

=== Tenure ===
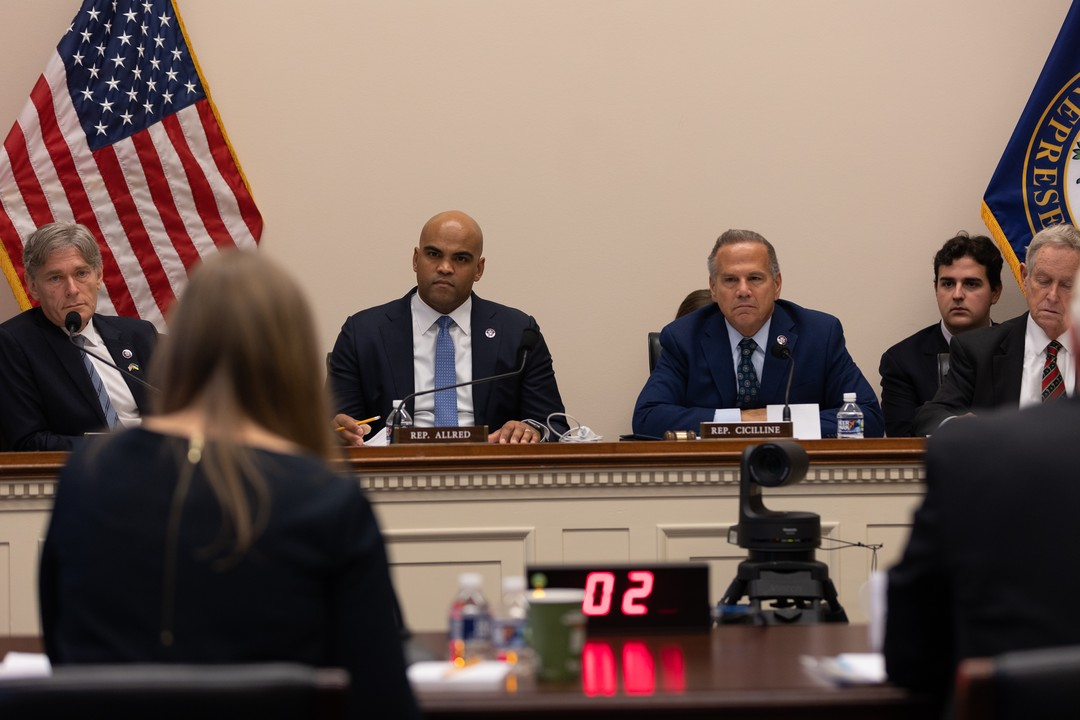
Allred while on the Committee of Foreign Affairs asks questions at a hearing on the humanitarian crisis in Yemen in 2022.

Allred was elected co-president of the Democratic freshmen of the 116th Congress (2019–2021), alongside fellow Obama administration alumna Haley Stevens (whom he later endorsed in 2022 in her competitive primary against Andy Levin).

He endorsed his former boss and fellow Texan, former housing and urban development secretary Julian Castro, in the 2020 Democratic presidential primaries. After Castro withdrew from the race, Allred endorsed Joe Biden.

Allred voted for the two articles of impeachment against President Donald J. Trump in his first impeachment in 2019. He also voted to impeach Trump during his second impeachment in 2021, following the January 6 Capitol attack.

Allred worked with Senator John Cornyn on the Bipartisan Safer Communities Act. He also initiated efforts to establish the Garland VA Medical Center, and supported passage of legislation for new veterans' facilities, including a VA clinic in El Paso and a spinal cord injury center in Dallas in 2022. Additionally, he supported the Consolidated Appropriations Act of 2023, which secured funds for infrastructure upgrades at the Corpus Christi Port Ship Channel. He also sought $241 million in earmarks for his district, for projects largely at Dallas Fort Worth International Airport in 2021.

=== Committee assignments ===
- Committee on Foreign Affairs
  - Subcommittee on the Middle East, North Africa and International Terrorism
- Committee on Transportation and Infrastructure
  - Subcommittee on Aviation
  - Subcommittee on Highways and Transit
  - Subcommittee on Railroads, Pipelines, and Hazardous Materials
- Committee on Veterans' Affairs
  - Subcommittee on Disability Assistance and Memorial Affairs

=== Caucus memberships ===
- Congressional Equality Caucus
- Congressional Black Caucus
- New Democrat Coalition
- Bipartisan Paid Leave Working Group
- Supply Chain Caucus; Co-chair
- Future Forum; Co-chair of Communications

== U.S. Senate campaigns ==
=== 2024 ===
On May 3, 2023, Allred announced his candidacy for the United States Senate in 2024, challenging Republican incumbent Ted Cruz. In March 2024, he won the primary nomination for the Democratic Party.

On November 5, 2024, Allred lost the general election to Cruz by 8.5%. Allred overperformed Kamala Harris in the concurrent presidential election by 5.5%, receiving nearly 200,000 votes more than Harris did and receiving greater support in the largely Hispanic Rio Grande Valley.

=== 2026 ===
On July 1, 2025, Allred announced that he would run for the U.S. Senate again in 2026, intending to challenge incumbent Republican senator John Cornyn. On December 8, 2025 Allred announced he was ending his campaign, to instead run in Texas's 33rd congressional district, following Representative Jasmine Crockett's entry into the Democratic race. After his withdrawal, former rival candidate James Talarico faced controversy after a social media influencer alleged he had referred to Allred as a "mediocre Black man" in comparison to Crockett in a private conversation; Talarico disputed the claim as a mischaracterization. Allred subsequently endorsed Crockett and criticized Talarico. Crockett eventually lost the Democratic primary to Talarico, with Crockett later endorsing Allred during his House campaign.

== Political positions ==
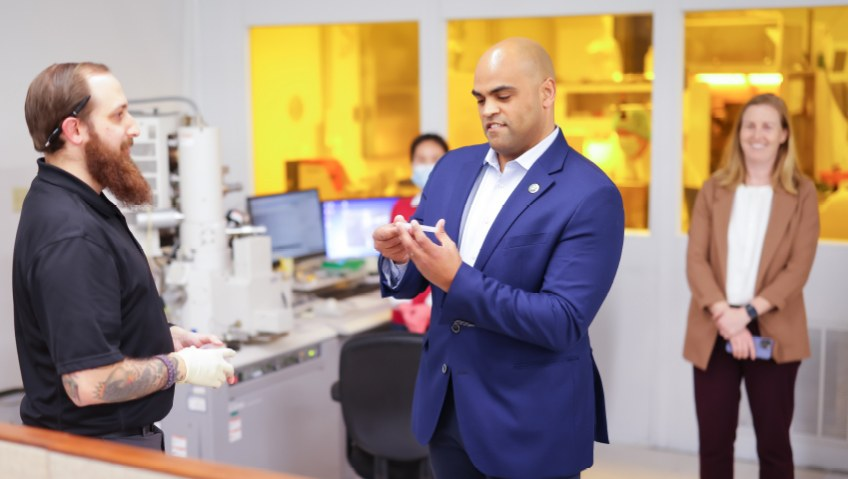
Allred visits a chip factory in Texas and pushes for the bipartisan Building Chips in America bill in 2023.

Allred is a moderate Democrat. Over 70% of the bills he has cosponsored have had bipartisan support. In 2023, the Common Ground Committee named Allred the most bipartisan member of Congress from Texas.

=== Abortion rights ===
Allred is pro-choice. He opposes the state abortion ban in Texas. He supports legislating to restore the legal situation that existed under the Supreme Court's 1973 abortion decision, Roe v. Wade.

=== COVID-19 ===
In 2021, Allred emphasized the importance of vaccination against COVID-19 and criticized others for spreading COVID-19 vaccine misinformation and hesitancy. In 2021, he stated that, while supportive of the economic stimulus proposed at the time, vaccination was the most important step people could take, noting that "[n]o amount of aid of any kind is going to allow us to outspend this virus." He has also opposed overriding the Medicare and Medicaid rules requiring health care workers to be vaccinated.

=== Foreign policy ===
Allred speaks during a House Foreign Affairs Committee hearing concerning the return of Americans detained abroad (2023).

Allred voted in December 2023 to provide Israel with support following the October 7 attacks.

Allred voted in 2023 against a resolution directing President Joe Biden to remove U.S. troops from Syria within 180 days.

Allred criticized Trump's initial strikes in the 2026 Iran war. He stated, "Donald Trump promised he would end wars, not start them. Yet again, he has broken that promise, launching military strikes on Iran without Congressional authorization and without articulating a clear path forward to the American people."

=== Gun laws ===
In 2022, after the mass shooting in Uvalde, Texas, he voted for the Bipartisan Safer Communities Act which incentivized states to pass red-flag laws and significantly narrowed the so-called boyfriend loophole, which had allowed abusive partners to obtain guns so long as they were not married to the survivor of the abuse. He has also supported a federal assault weapons ban.

=== Immigration ===
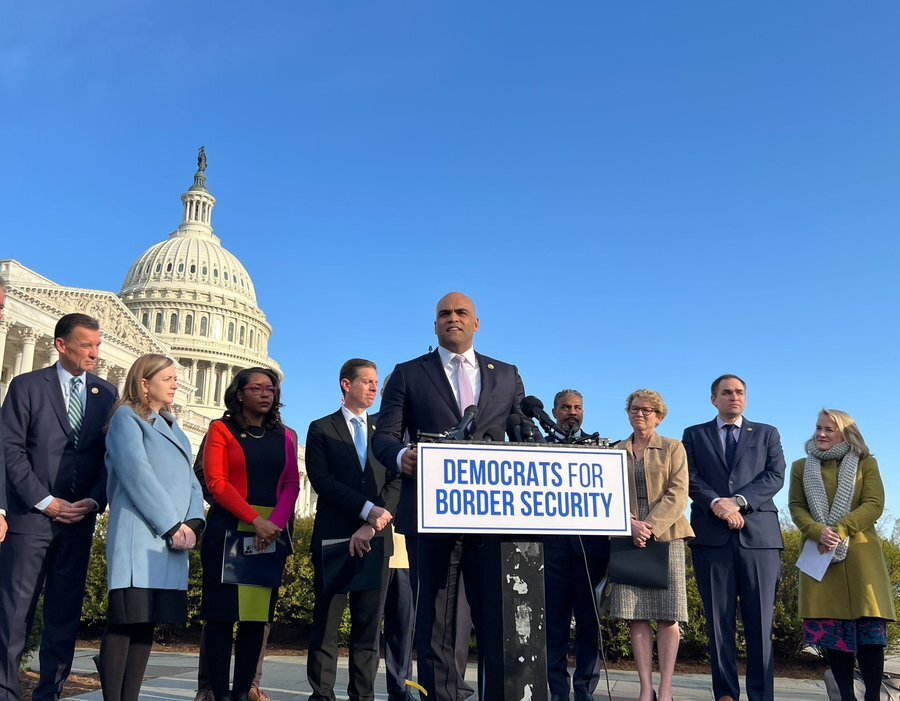
Allred at an event addressing the issue of border security in 2024.

In January 2024, Allred was one of 14 Democrats who voted for a resolution to "denounce the Biden administration's open-borders policies".

=== Voting rights ===
Allred led a group of House Democrats in 2021 in sending a letter to their Senate colleagues urging them to pass the Freedom to Vote Act. A year later, he was a lead cosponsor for the Sustaining Our Democracy Act which sought to upgrade voting equipment, improve cybersecurity, expand early voting, and hire and train poll workers.

== Personal life ==
Allred married Alexandra Eber on March 25, 2017. As of 2021, they had two sons.

== NFL statistics ==
Pre-draft measurables
| Height | Weight | 40-yard dash | 20-yard shuttle | Three-cone drill | Vertical jump | Broad jump | Bench press |
|---|---|---|---|---|---|---|---|
| 6 ft 1 in (1.85 m) | 237 lb (108 kg) | 4.85 s | 4.37 s | 7.33 s | 34.0 in (0.86 m) | 9 ft 7 in (2.92 m) | 17 reps |
All values from pro day

== Electoral history ==
Democratic primary results, 2018
| Party | Candidate | Votes | % |
|---|---|---|---|
| Democratic | Colin Allred | 15,442 | 38.5 |
| Democratic | Lillian Salerno | 7,343 | 18.3 |
| Democratic | Brett Shipp | 6,550 | 16.4 |
| Democratic | Ed Meier | 5,474 | 13.7 |
| Democratic | George Rodriguez | 3,029 | 7.5 |
| Democratic | Ron Marshall | 1,301 | 3.2 |
| Democratic | Todd Maternowski | 945 | 2.4 |
| Total votes | | 40,084 | 100.0 |

Democratic primary runoff results, 2018
| Party | Candidate | Votes | % |
|---|---|---|---|
| Democratic | Colin Allred | 15,658 | 69.5 |
| Democratic | Lillian Salerno | 6,874 | 30.5 |
| Total votes | | 22,532 | 100 |

Texas's 32nd congressional district, 2018
| Party | Candidate | Votes | % |
|---|---|---|---|
| Democratic | Colin Allred | 144,067 | 52.3 |
| Republican | Pete Sessions (incumbent) | 126,101 | 45.7 |
| Libertarian | Melina Baker | 5,452 | 2.0 |
| Total votes | | 275,620 | 100.0 |
| Democratic gain from Republican | | | |

Texas's 32nd congressional district, 2020
| Party | Candidate | Votes | % |
|---|---|---|---|
| Democratic | Colin Allred (incumbent) | 178,542 | 52.0 |
| Republican | Genevieve Collins | 157,867 | 45.9 |
| Libertarian | Christy Mowrey Peterson | 4,946 | 1.4 |
| Independent | Jason Sigmon | 2,332 | 0.7 |
| Total votes | | 343,687 | 100.0 |
| Democratic hold | | | |

Texas's 32nd congressional district, 2022
| Party | Candidate | Votes | % |
|---|---|---|---|
| Democratic | Colin Allred (incumbent) | 116,005 | 65.3 |
| Republican | Antonio Swad | 61,494 | 34.6 |
| Total votes | | 177,499 | 100.0 |
| Democratic hold | | | |

United States Senate Democratic primary results, 2024
| Party | Candidate | Votes | % |
|---|---|---|---|
| Democratic | Colin Allred | 569,585 | 58.9 |
| Democratic | Roland Gutierrez | 160,978 | 16.7 |
| Democratic | Mark Gonzalez | 85,228 | 8.8 |
| Democratic | Meri Gomez | 44,166 | 4.6 |
| Democratic | Carl Sherman | 31,694 | 3.3 |
| Democratic | Robert Hassan | 21,855 | 2.3 |
| Democratic | Steven Keough | 21,801 | 2.3 |
| Democratic | Heli Rodriguez-Prilliman | 18,801 | 1.9 |
| Democratic | Thierry Tchenko | 13,395 | 1.4 |
| Total votes | | 967,503 | 100.00 |

United States Senate election in Texas, 2024
| Party | Candidate | Votes | % |
|---|---|---|---|
| Republican | Ted Cruz (incumbent) | 5,990,741 | 53.07 |
| Democratic | Colin Allred | 5,031,249 | 44.57 |
| Libertarian | Ted Brown | 267,039 | 2.37 |
| Total votes | | 11,289,029 | 100 |
| Republican hold | | | |

Democratic primary results, 2026
| Party | Candidate | Votes | % |
|---|---|---|---|
| Democratic | Colin Allred | 31,482 | 44.0 |
| Democratic | Julie Johnson (incumbent) | 23,770 | 33.2 |
| Democratic | Carlos Quintanilla | 10,276 | 14.3 |
| Democratic | Zeeshan Hafeez | 6,083 | 8.5 |
| Total votes | | 71,611 | 100.0 |

Democratic primary runoff results, 2026
| Party | Candidate | Votes | % |
|---|---|---|---|
| Democratic | Colin Allred | 11,354 | 54.0 |
| Democratic | Julie Johnson (incumbent) | 9,677 | 46.0 |
| Total votes | | 21,031 | 100.0 |

== See also ==
- List of African-American United States representatives
- List of American sportsperson-politicians

U.S. House of Representatives
| Preceded by Pete Sessions | Member of the U.S. House of Representatives from Texas's 32nd congressional district 2019–2025 | Succeeded by Julie Johnson |
| Preceded by Julie Johnson; Redistricted | Member of the U.S. House of Representatives from Texas's 33rd congressional district Taking office 2027 | Elect |
Party political offices
| Preceded by Elizabeth Warren | Keynote Speaker of the Democratic National Convention; 2020; Served alongside: Stacey Abrams, Raumesh Akbari, Brendan Boyle, Yvanna Cancela, Kathleen Clyde, Nikki Fried, Robert Garcia, Malcolm Kenyatta, Marlon Kimpson, Conor Lamb, Mari Manoogian, Victoria Neave, Jonathan Nez, Sam Park, Denny Ruprecht, Randall Woodfin | Succeeded by Angela Alsobrooks |
| Preceded by Beto O'Rourke | Democratic nominee for U.S. Senator from Texas (Class 1); 2024 | Most recent |
U.S. order of precedence (ceremonial)
| Preceded by Will Hurd as Former U.S. Representative | Order of precedence of the United States as Former U.S. Representative | Succeeded by David R. Nagle as Former U.S. Representative |
