= Marc Veasey =

American politician (born 1971)

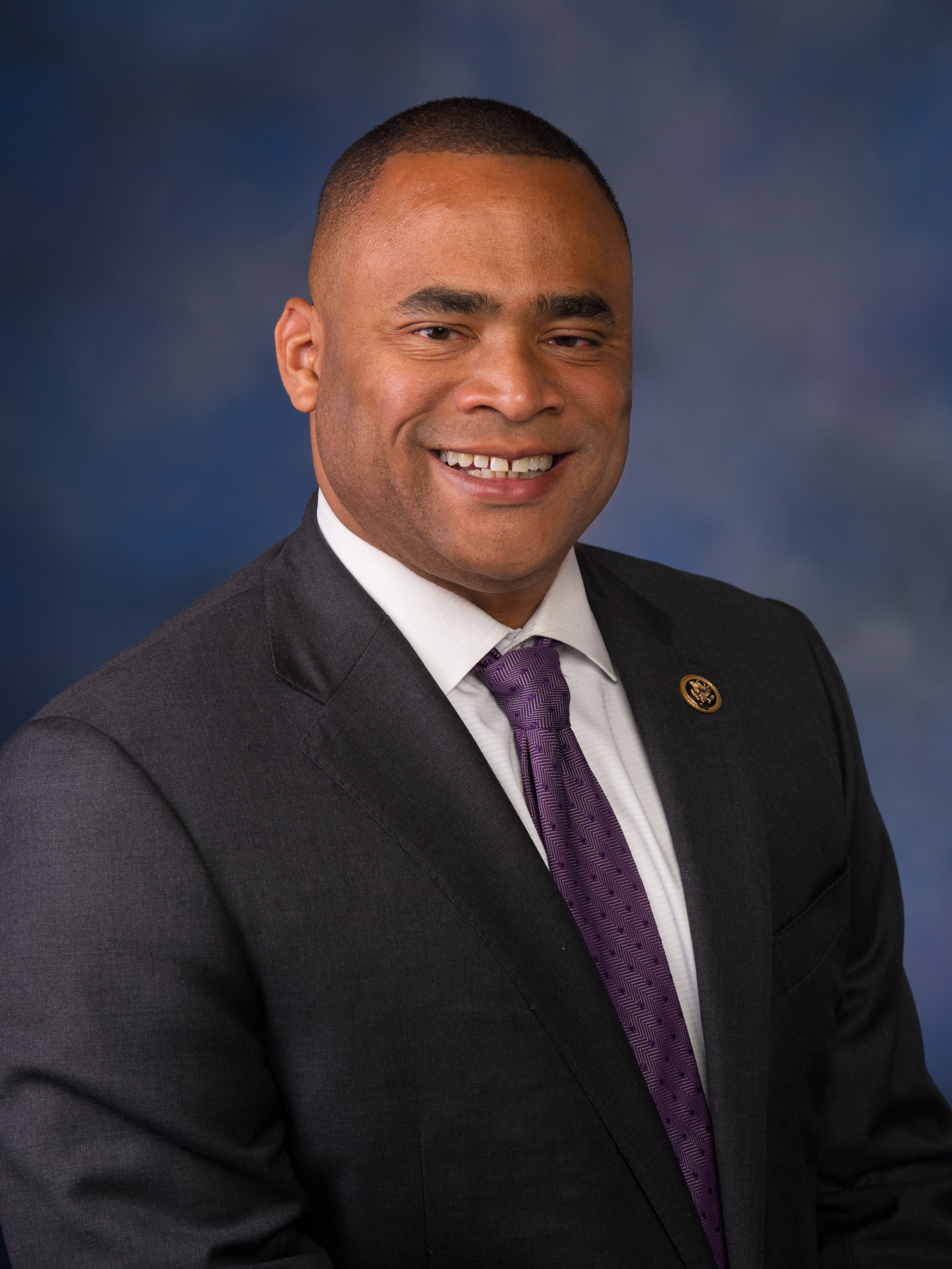
- Official portrait, 2016

Member of the U.S. House of Representatives from Texas's 33rd district
- Incumbent
- Assumed office January 3, 2013
- Preceded by: Constituency established

Member of the Texas House of Representatives from the 95th district
- In office January 11, 2005 – January 3, 2013
- Preceded by: Glenn Lewis
- Succeeded by: Nicole Collier

Personal details
- Born: Marc Allison Veasey; January 3, 1971 (age 55) Fort Worth, Texas, U.S.
- Party: Democratic
- Spouse: Tonya Jackson
- Children: 1
- Education: Texas Wesleyan University (BA)
- Website: House website Campaign website
- Veasey's voice Veasey on racial bias in the U.S. Military. Recorded June 21, 2023

Marc Allison Veasey (/ˈviːsɪ/; born January 3, 1971) is an American politician serving as a Democratic member of the United States House of Representatives for Texas's 33rd congressional district since 2013. From 2005 to 2013, he was a member of the Texas House of Representatives, where he served as chair pro tempore of the House Democratic Caucus.

On December 8, 2025, Veasey announced that he would not run for re-election and would instead run for Tarrant County judge. He suspended his campaign a week later on December 15.

== Early life and education ==
Veasey was born on January 3, 1971, to Connie and Joseph Veasey. With his parents and brother, Ryan, Veasey and his family lived in numerous rental houses in the Stop Six neighborhood of Fort Worth, Texas. When he was ten years old, his parents divorced, and Marc, Ryan and their mother moved in with their maternal grandmother in the Como neighborhood of Fort Worth.

Veasey attended Arlington Heights High School in Fort Worth. He graduated from Texas Wesleyan University with a Bachelor of Arts degree in mass communications.

== Early career ==
Veasey worked as a substitute teacher and sportswriter, as well as writing scripts for an advertising agency. One summer, he volunteered for U.S. Representative Martin Frost, and was hired as a field representative. Veasey worked for Frost for five years.

=== Texas House of Representatives ===
==== Elections ====
As a result of the 2003 Texas redistricting, Frost lost his reelection effort in 2004 to Pete Sessions. In 2004, Veasey challenged Democratic State Representative Glenn Lewis for Texas's 95th House district. He defeated Lewis 54%-46% in the primary and won the general election unopposed. He was reelected in 2006 (91%), 2008 (96%), and 2010 (100%).

==== Tenure ====
Veasey represented Texas House District 95 from 2005 to 2013. He was the chair pro tempore of the House Democratic Caucus. He sponsored measures to create career and technology training in high schools, and authored HB 62, which honored Tim Cole, a Texas Tech University student wrongly convicted of raping a fellow student in 1985. Veasey also authored a bill requiring a study to lead to greater enforcement of the James Byrd Jr. hate crime bill.

===== Committee assignments =====
- Elections Committee
- Environmental Regulation Committee
- Pensions, Investments, and Financial Services Committee
- Redistricting Committee
- Voter Identification & Voter Fraud Select Committee (Vice Chair)

== U.S. House of Representatives ==
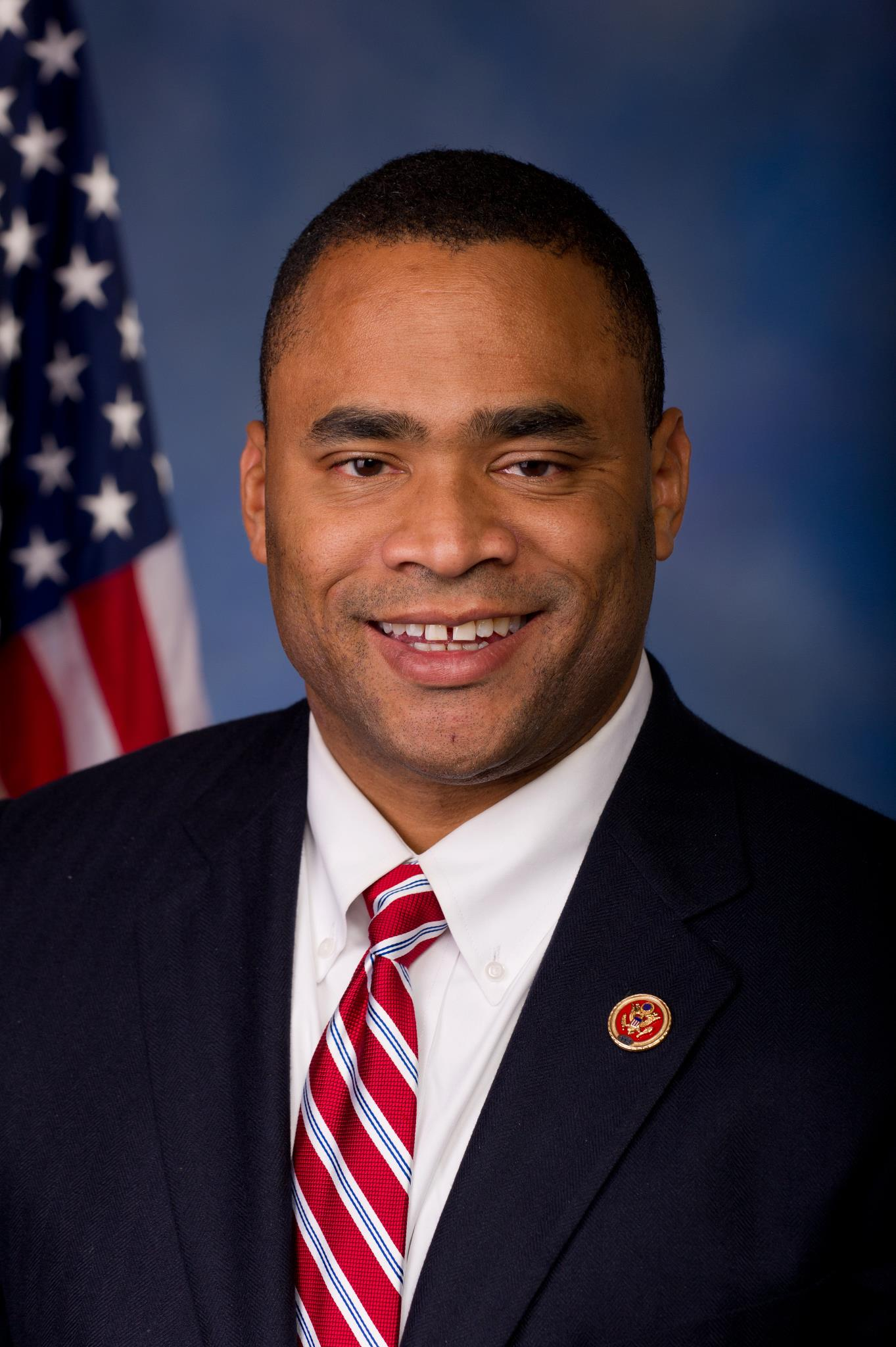
Veasey during the 113th Congress

=== Elections ===
==== 2012 ====
Veasey declared his candidacy for Texas's 33rd congressional district, a new congressional district for the United States House of Representatives that was created by reapportionment following the 2010 United States census. The district is based in Tarrant and Dallas counties. It is heavily Democratic: the Cook Partisan Voting Index (PVI) was D+14. It is also highly diverse: 66% Hispanic and 17% African American.

Eleven candidates filed to run in the Democratic primary. Veasey finished first, with 37% of the vote, less than the 50% needed to win the primary outright. State Representative Domingo García ranked second with 25% of the vote, qualifying for the runoff election. Veasey won Tarrant with 49% of the vote, while Garcia won Dallas with 44% of the vote. In the runoff, Veasey defeated Garcia, 53%-47%. He carried Tarrant with a 68% of the vote, as opposed to Garcia's 70% in Dallas. In the general election, he defeated Republican Chuck Bradley, 73%-26%. He won Tarrant with 78% of the vote and Dallas with 66% of the vote. Veasey is the first African-American U.S. Representative elected from Tarrant County.

==== 2014 ====
Veasey won re-nomination in the March 4 primary, defeating Tom Sanchez, 13,285 votes (73.5%) to 4,797 (26.5%). He faced no Republican opponent in the general election but Jason Reeves qualified for the ballot as a Libertarian.

==== 2016 ====
Veasey won re-nomination in the March 1 primary against activist Carlos Quintanilla with 63% of the vote. He lost Dallas County but won Tarrant County. He defeated Republican M. Mark Mitchell in the general election, 74% to 26%. Veasey spent $1.5 million on his campaign.

==== 2018 ====
Veasey again defeated Quintanilla in the primary, with 70% of the vote. In the general election he defeated Republican Willie Billups and Libertarian Jason Reeves with 76%.

==== 2020 ====
Veasey defeated Sean Segura in the primary, 64% to 36%. He was endorsed by the Dallas Morning News, which claimed Segura "lacks a cohesive knowledge of the district's public policy needs."

In the general election, Veasey beat Republican Fabian Cordova Vasquez and three minor candidates, including Quintanilla, with 67% of the vote, his weakest showing to date, largely due to Quintanilla's independent candidacy.

=== Political positions ===
Veasey voted with President Joe Biden's stated position 100% of the time in the 117th Congress, according to a FiveThirtyEight analysis.

On July 19, 2024, Veasey called for Joe Biden to withdraw from the 2024 United States presidential election.

==== Civil rights ====
Veasey is a supporter of abortion rights.

Veasey voted for the Violence Against Women Act and was rated the "preferred" candidate in 2020 by Feminist Majority Foundation. He co-sponsored the Student Non-Discrimination Act.

==== Energy and oil ====
Veasey has agreed with The Heritage Foundation and opposed the Sierra Club regarding offshore oil and gas in the Gulf of Mexico.

Veasey defended Texas oil and interests in February 2021 when President Joe Biden canceled the Keystone XL pipeline and issued a moratorium on new oil and gas leases on federal lands and waters.

=== Committee assignments ===
- Committee on Energy and Commerce
  - Subcommittee on Energy
  - Subcommittee on Health
  - Subcommittee on Commerce, Manufacturing and Trade
- Commission on Security and Cooperation in Europe

=== Caucus memberships ===
- Black Maternal Health Caucus
- Congressional Black Caucus
- LGBT Equality Caucus
- Congressional Arts Caucus
- Congressional Solar Caucus
- Blue Collar Caucus
- Congressional NextGen 9-1-1 Caucus
- U.S.-Japan Caucus
- New Democrat Coalition
- Medicare for All Caucus
- Congressional Caucus on Turkey and Turkish Americans
- Congressional Taiwan Caucus

== Personal life ==
Veasey is married to Tonya Jackson, a former Texas Senate aide. They have a son. Veasey's uncle, Robert James English, was a television reporter and worked for Jim Wright, a former Speaker of the United States House of Representatives.

== Electoral history ==
Election results
Year	Office	Election	Subject	Party	Votes	%	Opponent	Party	Votes	%	Opponent	Party	Votes	%								
2004	State Representative	Primary	Marc Veasey	Democratic	4,880	54.29%	Glenn Lewis (i)	Democratic	4,109	45.71%												
2004	State Representative	General	Marc Veasey	Democratic	33,769	100.00%																
2006	State Representative	General	Marc Veasey (i)	Democratic	18,259	90.53%	John Paul Robinson	Libertarian	1,909	9.47%												
2008	State Representative	General	Marc Veasey (i)	Democratic	39,150	95.52%	Hy Siegel	Libertarian	1,838	4.48%												
2010	State Representative	General	Marc Veasey (i)	Democratic	19,835	100.00%																
2012	U.S. Representative	Primary	Marc Veasey	Democratic	6,938	36.77%	Domingo Garcia	Democratic	4,715	24.99%	Kathleen Hicks	Democratic	2,372	12.57%								
							David Alameel	Democratic	2,064	10.94%	Manuel Valdez	Democratic	884	4.69%								
							Steve Salazar	Democratic	482	2.56%	Chrysta Castaneda	Democratic	395	2.09%								
							Jason E. Roberts	Democratic	342	1.81%	Carlos Quintanilla	Democratic	286	1.52%								
							Kyev P. Tatum Sr.	Democratic	201	1.07%	J. R. Molina	Democratic	189	1.00%								
2012	U.S. Representative	Primary Runoff	Marc Veasey	Democratic	10,766	52.73%	Domingo Garcia	Democratic	9,653	47.27%												
2012	U.S. Representative	General	Marc Veasey	Democratic	85,114	72.51%	Chuck Bradley	Republican	30,252	25.77%	Ed Lindsay	Green	2,009	1.71%								
2014	U.S. Representative	Primary	Marc Veasey (i)	Democratic	13,292	73.48%	Tom Sanchez	Democratic	4,798	26.52%												
2014	U.S. Representative	General	Marc Veasey (i)	Democratic	43,769	86.51%	Jason Reeves	Libertarian	6,823	13.49%												
2016	U.S. Representative	Primary	Marc Veasey (i)	Democratic	20,526	63.41%	Carlos Quintanilla	Democratic	11,846	36.59%												
2016	U.S. Representative	General	Marc Veasey (i)	Democratic	93,147	73.71%	M. Mark Mitchell	Republican	33,222	26.29%												
2018	U.S. Representative	Primary	Marc Veasey (i)	Democratic	15,175	70.32%	Carlos Quintanilla	Democratic	6,405	29.68%												
2018	U.S. Representative	General	Marc Veasey (i)	Democratic	90,805	76.16%	Willie Billups	Republican	26,120	21.91%	Jason Reeves	Libertarian	2,299	1.93%								
2020	U.S. Representative	Primary	Marc Veasey (i)	Democratic	23,869	63.57%	Sean Paul Segura	Democratic	13,678	36.43%												
2020	U.S. Representative	General	Marc Veasey (i)	Democratic	105,317	66.82%	Fabian Cordova Vasquez	Republican	39,638	25.15%	Carlos Quintanilla	Independent	8,071	5.12%	Jason Reeves	Libertarian	2,586	1.64%	Rene Wilton	Independent	1,994	1.27%
2022	U.S. Representative	Primary	Marc Veasey (i)	Democratic	16,806	69.51%	Carlos Quintanilla	Democratic	7,373	30.49%												
2022	U.S. Representative	General	Marc Veasey (i)	Democratic	82,081	71.98%	Patrick David Gillespie	Republican	29,203	25.61%	Ken Ashby	Libertarian	2,746	2.41%								
2024	U.S. Representative	Primary	Marc Veasey (i)	Democratic	15,313	68.32%	Carlos Quintanilla	Democratic	7,102	31.68%												
2024	U.S. Representative	General	Marc Veasey (i)	Democratic	114,289	68.79%	Patrick David Gillespie	Republican	51,864	31.21%												

== See also ==
- List of African-American United States representatives

U.S. House of Representatives
New constituency	Member of the U.S. House of Representatives from Texas's 33rd congressional district 2013–present	Incumbent
U.S. order of precedence (ceremonial)
Preceded by Juan Vargas	United States representatives by seniority 115th	Succeeded by Ann Wagner
