= List of new members of the 115th United States Congress =

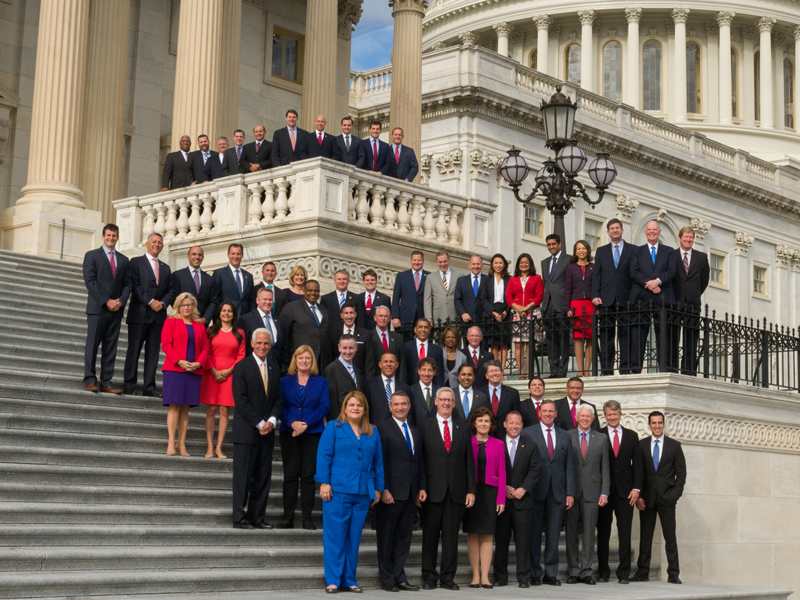
Freshman members on the Capitol steps

The 115th United States Congress began on January 3, 2017. There were seven new senators (five Democrats, two Republicans) and 52 new representatives (25 Democrats, 27 Republicans), as well as one new delegate (a Republican), at the start of its first session. Additionally, five senators (two Democrats, three Republicans) and 15 representatives (six Democrats, nine Republicans) took office on various dates in order to fill vacancies during the 115th Congress before it ended on January 3, 2019.

Due to court-ordered redistricting in three states, three representatives were elected from newly established congressional districts.

The co-presidents of the House Democratic freshman class were Nanette Barragán of California, Val Demings of Florida, and Donald McEachin of Virginia, while the president of the House Republican freshman class was Jack Bergman of Michigan. Additionally, the Democratic Freshmen Leadership Representative was Colleen Hanabusa of Hawaii (who was elected during the 114th Congress), and the Republican's freshmen liaison was Paul Mitchell of Michigan.

== Senate ==
=== Took office January 3, 2017 ===
State	Image	Senator	Seniority	Switched party	Prior background	Birth year	Ref
California		Kamala Harris (D)	5th (98th overall)	No; Open seat; replaced Barbara Boxer (D)	Attorney General of California; San Francisco District Attorney	1964	
Illinois		Tammy Duckworth (D)	3rd (96th overall)	Yes; Defeated Mark Kirk (R)	U.S. House of Representatives (Note: Elected to the 113th Congress, serving from 2013 to 2017 in Illinois's 8th district.); Assistant Secretary of Veterans Affairs; Illinois Director of Veterans' Affairs; U.S. Army Lieutenant Colonel	1968	
Indiana		Todd Young (R)	2nd (95th overall)	No; Open seat; replaced Dan Coats (R)	U.S. House of Representatives (Note: Elected to the 112th Congress, serving from 2011 to 2017 in Indiana's 9th district.); Orange County assistant deputy prosecutor U.S. Marine Corps Captain	1972	
Louisiana		John Kennedy (R)	6th (99th overall)	No; Open seat; replaced David Vitter (R)	Louisiana State Treasurer; Louisiana Secretary of Revenue	1951	
Maryland		Chris Van Hollen (D)	1st (94th overall)	No; Open seat; replaced Barbara Mikulski (D)	U.S. House of Representatives (Note: Elected to the 108th Congress, serving from 2003 to 2017 in Maryland's 8th district.); Maryland Senate; Maryland House of Delegates	1959	
Nevada		Catherine Cortez Masto (D)	7th (100th overall)	No; Open seat; replaced Harry Reid (D)	Nevada Attorney General	1964	
New Hampshire		Maggie Hassan (D)	4th (97th overall)	Yes; Defeated Kelly Ayotte (R)	Governor of New Hampshire; Majority Leader of the New Hampshire Senate	1958	

=== Took office during the 115th Congress ===
State	Image	Senator	Took office	Switched party	Prior background	Birth year	Ref
Alabama		Luther Strange (R)	February 9, 2017	No; Appointed; replaced Jeff Sessions (R)	Attorney General of Alabama	1953	
Alabama		Doug Jones (D)	January 3, 2018	Yes; Replaced Luther Strange (R), who was defeated in a primary	U.S. Attorney for Northern Alabama; Assistant U.S. Attorney	1954	
Minnesota		Tina Smith (DFL)	January 3, 2018	No; Appointed; replaced Al Franken (DFL)	Lieutenant Governor of Minnesota; Chief of staff to Governor Mark Dayton; Chief of staff to Mayor R. T. Rybak	1958	
Mississippi		Cindy Hyde-Smith (R)	April 9, 2018	No; Appointed; replaced Thad Cochran (R)	Mississippi Commissioner of Agriculture and Commerce; Mississippi State Senate	1959	
Arizona		Jon Kyl (R)	September 5, 2018	No; Appointed; replaced John McCain (R)	U.S. Senate (Note: Previously elected to the 104th Congress, serving from 1995 to 2013.); U.S. House of Representatives (Note: Elected to the 100th Congress, serving from 1987 to 1995 in Arizona's 4th district.)	1942	

== House of Representatives ==
=== Took office January 3, 2017 ===
District	Image	Representative	Switched party	Prior background	Birth year	Ref
Arizona 1		Tom O'Halleran (D)	No; Open seat; replaced Ann Kirkpatrick (D)	Arizona Senate; Arizona House of Representatives	1946	
Arizona 5		Andy Biggs (R)	No; Open seat; replaced Matt Salmon (R)	President of the Arizona Senate; Arizona House of Representatives	1958	
California 17		Ro Khanna (D)	No; Defeated Mike Honda (D)	Lawyer	1976	
California 20		Jimmy Panetta (D)	No; Open seat; replaced Sam Farr (D)	Monterey County deputy district attorney U.S. Navy Reserve	1969	
California 24		Salud Carbajal (D)	No; Open seat; replaced Lois Capps (D)	Santa Barbara County Board of Supervisors; U.S. Marine Corps Reserve	1964	
California 44		Nanette Barragán (D)	No; Open seat; replaced Janice Hahn (D)	Hermosa Beach City Council	1976	
California 46		Lou Correa (D)	No; Open seat; replaced Loretta Sanchez (D)	California State Senate; Orange County Board of Supervisors; California State Assembly	1958	
Delaware at-large		Lisa Blunt Rochester (D)	No; Open seat; replaced John Carney (D)	Delaware Secretary of Labor; CEO of the Wilmington Urban League	1962	
Florida 1		Matt Gaetz (R)	No; Open seat; replaced Jeff Miller (R)	Florida House of Representatives	1982	
Florida 2		Neal Dunn (R)	Yes; Open seat; replaced Gwen Graham (D)	Surgeon; U.S. Army Major	1953	
Florida 4		John Rutherford (R)	No; Open seat; replaced Ander Crenshaw (R)	Sheriff of Jacksonville	1952	
Florida 5		Al Lawson (D)	No; Defeated Corrine Brown (D) in a primary	Minority Leader of the Florida Senate; Florida House of Representatives	1948	
Florida 7		Stephanie Murphy (D)	Yes; Defeated John Mica (R)	National security specialist	1978	
Florida 9		Darren Soto (D)	No; Open seat; replaced Alan Grayson (D)	Florida Senate; Florida House of Representatives	1978	
Florida 10		Val Demings (D)	New seat	Chief of the Orlando Police Department	1957	
Florida 13		Charlie Crist (D)	Yes; Defeated David Jolly (R)	Governor of Florida; Florida Attorney General; Florida Education Commissioner; Florida Senate	1956	
Florida 18		Brian Mast (R)	Yes; Open seat; replaced Patrick Murphy (D)	National Nuclear Security Administration; U.S. Army EOD specialist	1980	
Florida 19		Francis Rooney (R)	No; Open seat; replaced Curt Clawson (R)	U.S. Ambassador to the Holy See	1953	
Georgia 3		Drew Ferguson (R)	No; Open seat; replaced Lynn Westmoreland (R)	Mayor of West Point; Dentist	1966	
Illinois 8		Raja Krishnamoorthi (D)	No; Open seat; replaced Tammy Duckworth (D)	Campaign staffer Lawyer	1973	
Illinois 10		Brad Schneider (D)	Yes; Defeated Bob Dold (R)	U.S. House of Representatives (Note: Previously elected to the 113th Congress, serving from 2013 to 2015.)	1961	
Indiana 3		Jim Banks (R)	No; Open seat; replaced Marlin Stutzman (R)	Indiana Senate; U.S. Navy Reserve Lieutenant	1979	
Indiana 9		Trey Hollingsworth (R)	No; Open seat; replaced Todd Young (R)	Entrepreneur	1983	
Kansas 1		Roger Marshall (R)	No; Defeated Tim Huelskamp (R) in a primary	Obstetrician; U.S. Army Reserve Captain	1960	
Louisiana 3		Clay Higgins (R)	No; Open seat; replaced Charles Boustany (R)	Lafayette City Marshal; St. Landry Sheriff's Office; Louisiana National Guard Staff Sergeant	1961	
Louisiana 4		Mike Johnson (R)	No; Open seat; replaced John Fleming (R)	Louisiana House of Representatives	1972	
Maryland 4		Anthony Brown (D)	No; Open seat; replaced Donna Edwards (D)	Lieutenant Governor of Maryland; Maryland House of Delegates; U.S. Army Reserve Colonel	1961	
Maryland 8		Jamie Raskin (D)	No; Open seat; replaced Chris Van Hollen (D)	Maryland Senate	1962	
Michigan 1		Jack Bergman (R)	No; Open seat; replaced Dan Benishek (R)	U.S. Marine Corps Lieutenant General	1947	
Michigan 10		Paul Mitchell (R)	No (Note: Mitchell became an independent in December 2020, during the 116th Congress.); Open seat; replaced Candice Miller (R)	St. Clair City Council; Owner of Ross Medical Education Center	1956	
Minnesota 2		Jason Lewis (R)	No; Open seat; replaced John Kline (R)	Radio personality	1955	
Nebraska 2		Don Bacon (R)	Yes; Defeated Brad Ashford (D)	Assistant professor at Bellevue University; U.S. Air Force Brigadier General	1963	
Nevada 3		Jacky Rosen (D)	Yes; Open seat; replaced Joe Heck (R)	Computer software developer	1957	
Nevada 4		Ruben Kihuen (D)	Yes; Defeated Cresent Hardy (R)	Nevada Senate; Nevada Assembly	1980	
New Hampshire 1		Carol Shea-Porter (D)	Yes; Defeated Frank Guinta (R)	U.S. House of Representatives (Note: Previously elected to the 110th Congress, serving from 2007 to 2011; elected again to the 113th Congress, serving from 2013 to 2015.)	1952	
New Jersey 5		Josh Gottheimer (D)	Yes; Defeated Scott Garrett (R)	Counselor to FCC Chair Julius Genachowski; Vice President of Burson Cohn & Wolfe; Speechwriter for President Bill Clinton	1975	
New York 3		Thomas Suozzi (D)	No; Open seat; replaced Steve Israel (D)	Nassau County Executive; Mayor of Glen Cove	1962	
New York 13		Adriano Espaillat (D)	No; Open seat; replaced Charles Rangel (D)	New York State Senate; New York State Assembly	1954	
New York 19		John Faso (R)	No; Open seat; replaced Chris Gibson (R)	Minority Leader of the New York State Assembly	1952	
New York 22		Claudia Tenney (R)	No; Open seat; replaced Richard Hanna (R)	New York State Assembly	1961	
North Carolina 13		Ted Budd (R)	New seat	Business owner	1971	
Pennsylvania 8		Brian Fitzpatrick (R)	No; Open seat; replaced Mike Fitzpatrick (R)	Assistant U.S. Attorney; Federal Bureau of Investigation	1973	
Pennsylvania 16		Lloyd Smucker (R)	No; Open seat; replaced Joe Pitts (R)	Pennsylvania State Senate; West Lampeter Township Board of Supervisors	1964	
Tennessee 8		David Kustoff (R)	No; Open seat; replaced Stephen Fincher (R)	U.S. Attorney for Western Tennessee	1966	
Texas 15		Vicente Gonzalez (D)	No; Open seat; replaced Rubén Hinojosa (D)	Lawyer	1967	
Texas 19		Jodey Arrington (R)	No; Open seat; replaced Randy Neugebauer (R)	Vice Chancellor of Texas Tech University; Chief of staff to the Federal Deposit Insurance Corporation; Special Assistant to President George W. Bush	1972	
Virginia 2		Scott Taylor (R)	No; Open seat; replaced Scott Rigell (R)	Virginia House of Delegates; U.S. Navy SEAL	1979	
Virginia 4		Donald McEachin (D)	New seat	Virginia Senate; Virginia House of Delegates	1961	
Virginia 5		Tom Garrett (R)	No; Open seat; replaced Robert Hurt (R)	Virginia Senate; Louisa County Commonwealth's Attorney	1972	
Washington 7		Pramila Jayapal (D)	No; Open seat; replaced Jim McDermott (D)	Washington State Senate	1965	
Wisconsin 8		Mike Gallagher (R)	No; Open seat; replaced Reid Ribble (R)	Congressional staffer U.S. Marine Corps Captain	1984	
Wyoming at-large		Liz Cheney (R)	No; Open seat; replaced Cynthia Lummis (R)	Deputy Assistant Secretary of State; Co-chair of the Iran Syria Policy and Operations Group	1966	

==== Non-voting members ====
District	Image	Delegate	Switched party	Prior background	Birth year	Ref
Puerto Rico at-large		Jenniffer González (NP/R)	No/Yes; Open seat; replaced Pedro Pierluisi (NP/D)	Speaker of the Puerto Rico House of Representatives; Chair of the Republican Party of Puerto Rico	1976	

=== Took office during the 115th Congress ===
District	Image	Representative	Took office	Switched party	Prior background	Birth year	Ref
Kansas 4		Ron Estes (R)	April 25, 2017	No; Succeeded Mike Pompeo (R)	Kansas State Treasurer; Sedgwick County Treasurer	1956	
Montana at-large		Greg Gianforte (R)	June 21, 2017	No; Succeeded Ryan Zinke (R)	Co-founder of RightNow Technologies; Electrical engineer	1961	
Georgia 6		Karen Handel (R)	June 26, 2017	No; Succeeded Tom Price (R)	Georgia Secretary of State; Fulton County Board of Commissioners	1962	
South Carolina 5		Ralph Norman (R)	June 26, 2017	No; Succeeded Mick Mulvaney (R)	South Carolina House of Representatives	1953	
California 34		Jimmy Gomez (D)	July 11, 2017	No; Succeeded Xavier Becerra (D)	California State Assembly; Labor organizer	1974	
Utah 3		John Curtis (R)	November 13, 2017	No; Succeeded Jason Chaffetz (R)	Mayor of Provo	1960	
Pennsylvania 18		Conor Lamb (D)	April 12, 2018	Yes; Succeeded Tim Murphy (R)	Assistant U.S. Attorney; U.S. Marine Corps Major	1984	
Arizona 8		Debbie Lesko (R)	May 7, 2018	No; Succeeded Trent Franks (R)	Arizona Senate; Arizona House of Representatives	1958	
Texas 27		Michael Cloud (R)	July 10, 2018	No; Succeeded Blake Farenthold (R)	Business owner	1975	
Ohio 12		Troy Balderson (R)	September 5, 2018	No; Succeeded Pat Tiberi (R)	Ohio Senate; Ohio House of Representatives	1962	
New York 25		Joseph Morelle (D)	November 13, 2018	No; Succeeded Louise Slaughter (D)	Majority Leader of the New York State Assembly; Monroe County Legislature	1957	
Oklahoma 1		Kevin Hern (R)	November 13, 2018	No; Open seat; replaced Jim Bridenstine (R)	Businessman	1961	
Pennsylvania 7		Mary Gay Scanlon (D)	November 13, 2018	Yes; Succeeded Pat Meehan (R)	Wallingford-Swarthmore School Board	1959	
Pennsylvania 15		Susan Wild (D)	November 27, 2018	Yes; Succeeded Charlie Dent (R)	Solicitor of Allentown	1957	
Michigan 13		Brenda Jones (D)	November 29, 2018	No; Succeeded John Conyers (D)	President of the Detroit City Council	1959	

== See also ==
- List of United States representatives in the 115th Congress
- List of United States senators in the 115th Congress

== Notes ==
Preceded by New members of the 114th Congress	New members of the 115th Congress; 2017–2019	Succeeded by New members of the 116th Congress
