= List of United States representatives in the 115th Congress =

This is a complete list of United States representatives during the 115th United States Congress, which ran from January 3, 2017, through January 3, 2019, ordered by seniority.

== Seniority list ==
Rank	Representative	Party	District	Seniority date	Previous service	Notes
1	John Conyers	D	Michigan 13	January 3, 1965		Dean of the House; Ranking Member: Judiciary; Resigned on December 5, 2017.
2	Don Young	R	Alaska at-large	March 6, 1973		Dean of the House from December 5, 2017
3	Jim Sensenbrenner	R	Wisconsin 5	January 3, 1979		
4	Hal Rogers	R	Kentucky 5	January 3, 1981		
5	Chris Smith	R	New Jersey 4	January 3, 1981		
6	Steny Hoyer	D	Maryland 5	May 19, 1981		Minority Whip
7	Marcy Kaptur	D	Ohio 9	January 3, 1983		
8	Sander Levin	D	Michigan 9	January 3, 1983		
9	Joe Barton	R	Texas 6	January 3, 1985		
10	Pete Visclosky	D	Indiana 1	January 3, 1985		
11	Peter DeFazio	D	Oregon 4	January 3, 1987		Ranking Member: Transportation and Infrastructure
12	John Lewis	D	Georgia 5	January 3, 1987		
13	Louise Slaughter	D	New York 25	January 3, 1987		Ranking Member: Rules; Died on March 16, 2018.
14	Lamar Smith	R	Texas 21	January 3, 1987		Chair: Science, Space and Technology
15	Fred Upton	R	Michigan 6	January 3, 1987		
16	Nancy Pelosi	D	California 12	June 2, 1987		Minority Leader
17	Jimmy Duncan	R	Tennessee 2	November 8, 1988		
18	Frank Pallone	D	New Jersey 6	November 8, 1988		Ranking Member: Energy and Commerce
19	Eliot Engel	D	New York 16	January 3, 1989		Ranking Member: Foreign Affairs
20	Nita Lowey	D	New York 17	January 3, 1989		Ranking Member: Appropriations
21	Richard Neal	D	Massachusetts 1	January 3, 1989		Ranking Member: Ways and Means
22	Dana Rohrabacher	R	California 48	January 3, 1989		
23	Ileana Ros-Lehtinen	R	Florida 27	August 29, 1989		
24	José E. Serrano	D	New York 15	March 20, 1990		
25	David Price	D	North Carolina 4	January 3, 1997	1987–1995	
26	Rosa DeLauro	D	Connecticut 3	January 3, 1991		
27	Collin Peterson	D	Minnesota 7	January 3, 1991		Ranking Member: Agriculture
28	Maxine Waters	D	California 43	January 3, 1991		Ranking Member: Financial Services
29	Sam Johnson	R	Texas 3	May 8, 1991		
30	Jerry Nadler	D	New York 10	November 3, 1992		Ranking Member: Judiciary from November 26, 2017 (Acting until December 20, 2017)
31	Jim Cooper	D	Tennessee 5	January 3, 2003	1983–1995	
32	Xavier Becerra	D	California 34	January 3, 1993		Resigned on January 24, 2017.
33	Sanford Bishop	D	Georgia 2	January 3, 1993		
34	Ken Calvert	R	California 42	January 3, 1993		
35	Jim Clyburn	D	South Carolina 6	January 3, 1993		Assistant Minority Leader
36	Anna Eshoo	D	California 18	January 3, 1993		
37	Bob Goodlatte	R	Virginia 6	January 3, 1993		Chair: Judiciary
38	Gene Green	D	Texas 29	January 3, 1993		
39	Luis Gutiérrez	D	Illinois 4	January 3, 1993		
40	Alcee Hastings	D	Florida 20	January 3, 1993		
41	Eddie Bernice Johnson	D	Texas 30	January 3, 1993		Ranking Member: Science, Space and Technology
42	Peter T. King	R	New York 2	January 3, 1993		
43	Carolyn Maloney	D	New York 12	January 3, 1993		
44	Lucille Roybal-Allard	D	California 40	January 3, 1993		
45	Ed Royce	R	California 39	January 3, 1993		Chair: Foreign Affairs
46	Bobby Rush	D	Illinois 1	January 3, 1993		
47	Bobby Scott	D	Virginia 3	January 3, 1993		Ranking Member: Education and the Workforce
48	Nydia Velázquez	D	New York 7	January 3, 1993		Ranking Member: Small Business
49	Bennie Thompson	D	Mississippi 2	April 13, 1993		Ranking Member: Homeland Security
50	Frank Lucas	R	Oklahoma 3	May 10, 1994		
51	Lloyd Doggett	D	Texas 35	January 3, 1995		
52	Mike Doyle	D	Pennsylvania 14	January 3, 1995		
53	Rodney Frelinghuysen	R	New Jersey 11	January 3, 1995		Chair: Appropriations
54	Sheila Jackson Lee	D	Texas 18	January 3, 1995		
55	Walter B. Jones Jr.	R	North Carolina 3	January 3, 1995		
56	Frank LoBiondo	R	New Jersey 2	January 3, 1995		
57	Zoe Lofgren	D	California 19	January 3, 1995		
58	Mac Thornberry	R	Texas 13	January 3, 1995		Chair: Armed Services
59	Elijah Cummings	D	Maryland 7	April 16, 1996		Ranking Member: Oversight and Government Reform
60	Earl Blumenauer	D	Oregon 3	May 21, 1996		
61	Robert Aderholt	R	Alabama 4	January 3, 1997		
62	Kevin Brady	R	Texas 8	January 3, 1997		Chair: Ways and Means
63	Danny K. Davis	D	Illinois 7	January 3, 1997		
64	Diana DeGette	D	Colorado 1	January 3, 1997		
65	Kay Granger	R	Texas 12	January 3, 1997		
66	Ron Kind	D	Wisconsin 3	January 3, 1997		
67	Jim McGovern	D	Massachusetts 2	January 3, 1997		Ranking Member: Rules from March 17, 2018 (Acting until April 10, 2018)
68	Bill Pascrell	D	New Jersey 9	January 3, 1997		
69	Pete Sessions	R	Texas 32	January 3, 1997		Chair: Rules
70	Brad Sherman	D	California 30	January 3, 1997		
71	John Shimkus	R	Illinois 15	January 3, 1997		
72	Adam Smith	D	Washington 9	January 3, 1997		Ranking Member: Armed Services
73	Gregory Meeks	D	New York 5	February 3, 1998		
74	Barbara Lee	D	California 13	April 7, 1998		
75	Bob Brady	D	Pennsylvania 1	May 19, 1998		Ranking Member: House Administration
76	Steve Chabot	R	Ohio 1	January 3, 2011	1995–2009	Chair: Small Business
77	Mike Capuano	D	Massachusetts 7	January 3, 1999		
78	Joe Crowley	D	New York 14	January 3, 1999		Democratic Caucus Chairman
79	John B. Larson	D	Connecticut 1	January 3, 1999		
80	Grace Napolitano	D	California 32	January 3, 1999		
81	Paul Ryan	R	Wisconsin 1	January 3, 1999		Speaker of the House
82	Jan Schakowsky	D	Illinois 9	January 3, 1999		
83	Mike Simpson	R	Idaho 2	January 3, 1999		
84	Mike Thompson	D	California 5	January 3, 1999		
85	Greg Walden	R	Oregon 2	January 3, 1999		Chair: Energy and Commerce
86	Lacy Clay	D	Missouri 1	January 3, 2001		
87	John Culberson	R	Texas 7	January 3, 2001		
88	Susan Davis	D	California 53	January 3, 2001		
89	Sam Graves	R	Missouri 6	January 3, 2001		
90	Darrell Issa	R	California 49	January 3, 2001		
91	James Langevin	D	Rhode Island 2	January 3, 2001		
92	Rick Larsen	D	Washington 2	January 3, 2001		
93	Betty McCollum	D	Minnesota 4	January 3, 2001		
94	Adam Schiff	D	California 28	January 3, 2001		Ranking Member: Intelligence
95	Pat Tiberi	R	Ohio 12	January 3, 2001		Resigned on January 15, 2018.
96	Bill Shuster	R	Pennsylvania 9	May 15, 2001		Chair: Transportation and Infrastructure
97	Stephen F. Lynch	D	Massachusetts 8	October 16, 2001		
98	Joe Wilson	R	South Carolina 2	December 18, 2001		
99	Rob Bishop	R	Utah 1	January 3, 2003		Chair: Natural Resources
100	Marsha Blackburn	R	Tennessee 7	January 3, 2003		
101	Michael C. Burgess	R	Texas 26	January 3, 2003		
102	John Carter	R	Texas 31	January 3, 2003		
103	Tom Cole	R	Oklahoma 4	January 3, 2003		
104	Mario Díaz-Balart	R	Florida 25	January 3, 2003		
105	Trent Franks	R	Arizona 8	January 3, 2003		Resigned on December 8, 2017.
106	Raúl Grijalva	D	Arizona 3	January 3, 2003		Ranking Member: Natural Resources
107	Jeb Hensarling	R	Texas 5	January 3, 2003		Chair: Financial Services
108	Steve King	R	Iowa 4	January 3, 2003		
109	Tim Murphy	R	Pennsylvania 18	January 3, 2003		Resigned on October 21, 2017.
110	Devin Nunes	R	California 22	January 3, 2003		Chair: Intelligence
111	Mike Rogers	R	Alabama 3	January 3, 2003		
112	Dutch Ruppersberger	D	Maryland 2	January 3, 2003		
113	Tim Ryan	D	Ohio 13	January 3, 2003		
114	Linda Sánchez	D	California 38	January 3, 2003		
115	David Scott	D	Georgia 13	January 3, 2003		
116	Mike Turner	R	Ohio 10	January 3, 2003		
117	G. K. Butterfield	D	North Carolina 1	July 20, 2004		
118	Emanuel Cleaver	D	Missouri 5	January 3, 2005		
119	Mike Conaway	R	Texas 11	January 3, 2005		Chair: Agriculture
120	Jim Costa	D	California 16	January 3, 2005		
121	Henry Cuellar	D	Texas 28	January 3, 2005		
122	Charlie Dent	R	Pennsylvania 15	January 3, 2005		Resigned on May 12, 2018.
123	Jeff Fortenberry	R	Nebraska 1	January 3, 2005		
124	Virginia Foxx	R	North Carolina 5	January 3, 2005		Chair: Education and the Workforce
125	Louie Gohmert	R	Texas 1	January 3, 2005		
126	Al Green	D	Texas 9	January 3, 2005		
127	Brian Higgins	D	New York 26	January 3, 2005		
128	Dan Lipinski	D	Illinois 3	January 3, 2005		
129	Kenny Marchant	R	Texas 24	January 3, 2005		
130	Michael McCaul	R	Texas 10	January 3, 2005		Chair: Homeland Security
131	Patrick McHenry	R	North Carolina 10	January 3, 2005		
132	Cathy McMorris Rodgers	R	Washington 5	January 3, 2005		Republican Conference Chairwoman
133	Gwen Moore	D	Wisconsin 4	January 3, 2005		
134	Ted Poe	R	Texas 2	January 3, 2005		
135	Tom Price	R	Georgia 6	January 3, 2005		Resigned on February 10, 2017.
136	Dave Reichert	R	Washington 8	January 3, 2005		
137	Debbie Wasserman Schultz	D	Florida 23	January 3, 2005		
138	Doris Matsui	D	California 6	March 8, 2005		
139	Albio Sires	D	New Jersey 8	November 7, 2006		
140	Steve Pearce	R	New Mexico 2	January 3, 2011	2003–2009	
141	Gus Bilirakis	R	Florida 12	January 3, 2007		
142	Vern Buchanan	R	Florida 16	January 3, 2007		
143	Kathy Castor	D	Florida 14	January 3, 2007		
144	Yvette Clarke	D	New York 9	January 3, 2007		
145	Steve Cohen	D	Tennessee 9	January 3, 2007		
146	Joe Courtney	D	Connecticut 2	January 3, 2007		
147	Keith Ellison	D	Minnesota 5	January 3, 2007		
148	Hank Johnson	D	Georgia 4	January 3, 2007		
149	Jim Jordan	R	Ohio 4	January 3, 2007		
150	Doug Lamborn	R	Colorado 5	January 3, 2007		
151	Dave Loebsack	D	Iowa 2	January 3, 2007		
152	Kevin McCarthy	R	California 23	January 3, 2007		Majority Leader
153	Jerry McNerney	D	California 9	January 3, 2007		
154	Ed Perlmutter	D	Colorado 7	January 3, 2007		
155	Peter Roskam	R	Illinois 6	January 3, 2007		
156	John Sarbanes	D	Maryland 3	January 3, 2007		
157	Adrian Smith	R	Nebraska 3	January 3, 2007		
158	Tim Walz	D	Minnesota 1	January 3, 2007		
159	Peter Welch	D	Vermont at-large	January 3, 2007		
160	John Yarmuth	D	Kentucky 3	January 3, 2007		
161	Niki Tsongas	D	Massachusetts 3	October 16, 2007		
162	Bob Latta	R	Ohio 5	December 11, 2007		
163	Rob Wittman	R	Virginia 1	December 11, 2007		
164	André Carson	D	Indiana 7	March 11, 2008		
165	Jackie Speier	D	California 14	April 8, 2008		
166	Steve Scalise	R	Louisiana 1	May 3, 2008		Majority Whip
167	Marcia Fudge	D	Ohio 11	November 18, 2008		
168	Rick Nolan	D	Minnesota 8	January 3, 2013	1975–1981	
169	Mark Sanford	R	South Carolina 1	May 7, 2013	1995–2001	
170	Jason Chaffetz	R	Utah 3	January 3, 2009		Chair: Oversight and Government Reform; Resigned on June 30, 2017.
171	Mike Coffman	R	Colorado 6	January 3, 2009		
172	Gerry Connolly	D	Virginia 11	January 3, 2009		
173	Brett Guthrie	R	Kentucky 2	January 3, 2009		
174	Gregg Harper	R	Mississippi 3	January 3, 2009		
175	Jim Himes	D	Connecticut 4	January 3, 2009		
176	Duncan D. Hunter	R	California 50	January 3, 2009		
177	Lynn Jenkins	R	Kansas 2	January 3, 2009		
178	Leonard Lance	R	New Jersey 7	January 3, 2009		
179	Blaine Luetkemeyer	R	Missouri 3	January 3, 2009		
180	Ben Ray Luján	D	New Mexico 3	January 3, 2009		Resigned on December 31, 2018.
181	Tom McClintock	R	California 4	January 3, 2009		
182	Pete Olson	R	Texas 22	January 3, 2009		
183	Erik Paulsen	R	Minnesota 3	January 3, 2009		
184	Chellie Pingree	D	Maine 1	January 3, 2009		
185	Jared Polis	D	Colorado 2	January 3, 2009		
186	Bill Posey	R	Florida 8	January 3, 2009		
187	Phil Roe	R	Tennessee 1	January 3, 2009		
188	Tom Rooney	R	Florida 17	January 3, 2009		
189	Kurt Schrader	D	Oregon 5	January 3, 2009		
190	Glenn Thompson	R	Pennsylvania 5	January 3, 2009		
191	Paul Tonko	D	New York 20	January 3, 2009		
192	Mike Quigley	D	Illinois 5	April 7, 2009		
193	Judy Chu	D	California 27	July 14, 2009		
194	John Garamendi	D	California 3	November 3, 2009		
195	Ted Deutch	D	Florida 21	April 13, 2010		Ranking Member: Ethics
196	Tom Graves	R	Georgia 14	June 8, 2010		
197	Tom Reed	R	New York 23	November 2, 2010		
198	Tim Walberg	R	Michigan 7	January 3, 2011	2007–2009	
199	Bill Foster	D	Illinois 11	January 3, 2013	2008–2011	
200	Justin Amash	R	Michigan 3	January 3, 2011		
201	Lou Barletta	R	Pennsylvania 11	January 3, 2011		
202	Karen Bass	D	California 37	January 3, 2011		
203	Diane Black	R	Tennessee 6	January 3, 2011		Chair: Budget Until January 11, 2018 (Acting until February 16, 2017)
204	Mo Brooks	R	Alabama 5	January 3, 2011		
205	Larry Bucshon	R	Indiana 8	January 3, 2011		
206	David Cicilline	D	Rhode Island 1	January 3, 2011		
207	Rick Crawford	R	Arkansas 1	January 3, 2011		
208	Jeff Denham	R	California 10	January 3, 2011		
209	Scott DesJarlais	R	Tennessee 4	January 3, 2011		
210	Sean Duffy	R	Wisconsin 7	January 3, 2011		
211	Jeff Duncan	R	South Carolina 3	January 3, 2011		
212	Blake Farenthold	R	Texas 27	January 3, 2011		Resigned on April 6, 2018.
213	Chuck Fleischmann	R	Tennessee 3	January 3, 2011		
214	Bill Flores	R	Texas 17	January 3, 2011		
215	Bob Gibbs	R	Ohio 7	January 3, 2011		
216	Paul Gosar	R	Arizona 4	January 3, 2011		
217	Trey Gowdy	R	South Carolina 4	January 3, 2011		Chair: Oversight and Government Reform From June 13, 2017
218	Morgan Griffith	R	Virginia 9	January 3, 2011		
219	Andy Harris	R	Maryland 1	January 3, 2011		
220	Vicky Hartzler	R	Missouri 4	January 3, 2011		
221	Jaime Herrera Beutler	R	Washington 3	January 3, 2011		
222	Bill Huizenga	R	Michigan 2	January 3, 2011		
223	Randy Hultgren	R	Illinois 14	January 3, 2011		
224	Bill Johnson	R	Ohio 6	January 3, 2011		
225	Bill Keating	D	Massachusetts 9	January 3, 2011		
226	Mike Kelly	R	Pennsylvania 3	January 3, 2011		
227	Adam Kinzinger	R	Illinois 16	January 3, 2011		
228	Raúl Labrador	R	Idaho 1	January 3, 2011		
229	Billy Long	R	Missouri 7	January 3, 2011		
230	Tom Marino	R	Pennsylvania 10	January 3, 2011		
231	David McKinley	R	West Virginia 1	January 3, 2011		
232	Pat Meehan	R	Pennsylvania 7	January 3, 2011		Resigned on April 27, 2018.
233	Mick Mulvaney	R	South Carolina 5	January 3, 2011		Resigned on February 16, 2017.
234	Kristi Noem	R	South Dakota at-large	January 3, 2011		
235	Steven Palazzo	R	Mississippi 4	January 3, 2011		
236	Mike Pompeo	R	Kansas 4	January 3, 2011		Resigned on January 23, 2017.
237	Jim Renacci	R	Ohio 16	January 3, 2011		
238	Cedric Richmond	D	Louisiana 2	January 3, 2011		
239	Martha Roby	R	Alabama 2	January 3, 2011		
240	Todd Rokita	R	Indiana 4	January 3, 2011		
241	Dennis Ross	R	Florida 15	January 3, 2011		
242	David Schweikert	R	Arizona 6	January 3, 2011		
243	Austin Scott	R	Georgia 8	January 3, 2011		
244	Terri Sewell	D	Alabama 7	January 3, 2011		
245	Steve Stivers	R	Ohio 15	January 3, 2011		
246	Scott Tipton	R	Colorado 3	January 3, 2011		
247	Daniel Webster	R	Florida 11	January 3, 2011		
248	Frederica Wilson	D	Florida 24	January 3, 2011		
249	Steve Womack	R	Arkansas 3	January 3, 2011		Chair: Budget From January 11, 2018
250	Rob Woodall	R	Georgia 7	January 3, 2011		
251	Kevin Yoder	R	Kansas 3	January 3, 2011		
252	Mark Amodei	R	Nevada 2	September 13, 2011		
253	Suzanne Bonamici	D	Oregon 1	January 31, 2012		
254	Suzan DelBene	D	Washington 1	November 6, 2012		
255	Thomas Massie	R	Kentucky 4	November 6, 2012		
256	Donald Payne Jr.	D	New Jersey 10	November 6, 2012		
257	Dina Titus	D	Nevada 1	January 3, 2013	2009–2011	
258	Colleen Hanabusa	D	Hawaii 1	November 8, 2016	2011–2015	
259	Carol Shea-Porter	D	New Hampshire 1	January 3, 2017	2007–2011; 2013–2015	
260	Andy Barr	R	Kentucky 6	January 3, 2013		
261	Joyce Beatty	D	Ohio 3	January 3, 2013		
262	Ami Bera	D	California 7	January 3, 2013		
263	Jim Bridenstine	R	Oklahoma 1	January 3, 2013		Resigned on April 23, 2018.
264	Susan Brooks	R	Indiana 5	January 3, 2013		Chair: Ethics
265	Julia Brownley	D	California 26	January 3, 2013		
266	Cheri Bustos	D	Illinois 17	January 3, 2013		
267	Tony Cárdenas	D	California 29	January 3, 2013		
268	Matt Cartwright	D	Pennsylvania 17	January 3, 2013		
269	Joaquin Castro	D	Texas 20	January 3, 2013		
270	Chris Collins	R	New York 27	January 3, 2013		
271	Doug Collins	R	Georgia 9	January 3, 2013		
272	Paul Cook	R	California 8	January 3, 2013		
273	Kevin Cramer	R	North Dakota at-large	January 3, 2013		
274	Rodney Davis	R	Illinois 13	January 3, 2013		
275	John Delaney	D	Maryland 6	January 3, 2013		
276	Ron DeSantis	R	Florida 6	January 3, 2013		Resigned on September 10, 2018.
277	Elizabeth Esty	D	Connecticut 5	January 3, 2013		
278	Lois Frankel	D	Florida 22	January 3, 2013		
279	Tulsi Gabbard	D	Hawaii 2	January 3, 2013		
280	Denny Heck	D	Washington 10	January 3, 2013		
281	George Holding	R	North Carolina 2	January 3, 2013		
282	Richard Hudson	R	North Carolina 8	January 3, 2013		
283	Jared Huffman	D	California 2	January 3, 2013		
284	Hakeem Jeffries	D	New York 8	January 3, 2013		
285	David Joyce	R	Ohio 14	January 3, 2013		
286	Joe Kennedy III	D	Massachusetts 4	January 3, 2013		
287	Dan Kildee	D	Michigan 5	January 3, 2013		
288	Derek Kilmer	D	Washington 6	January 3, 2013		
289	Annie Kuster	D	New Hampshire 2	January 3, 2013		
290	Doug LaMalfa	R	California 1	January 3, 2013		
291	Alan Lowenthal	D	California 47	January 3, 2013		
292	Michelle Lujan Grisham	D	New Mexico 1	January 3, 2013		
293	Sean Patrick Maloney	D	New York 18	January 3, 2013		
294	Mark Meadows	R	North Carolina 11	January 3, 2013		
295	Grace Meng	D	New York 6	January 3, 2013		
296	Luke Messer	R	Indiana 6	January 3, 2013		
297	Markwayne Mullin	R	Oklahoma 2	January 3, 2013		
298	Beto O'Rourke	D	Texas 16	January 3, 2013		
299	Scott Perry	R	Pennsylvania 4	January 3, 2013		
300	Scott Peters	D	California 52	January 3, 2013		
301	Robert Pittenger	R	North Carolina 9	January 3, 2013		
302	Mark Pocan	D	Wisconsin 2	January 3, 2013		
303	Tom Rice	R	South Carolina 7	January 3, 2013		
304	Keith Rothfus	R	Pennsylvania 12	January 3, 2013		
305	Raul Ruiz	D	California 36	January 3, 2013		
306	Kyrsten Sinema	D	Arizona 9	January 3, 2013		
307	Chris Stewart	R	Utah 2	January 3, 2013		
308	Eric Swalwell	D	California 15	January 3, 2013		
309	Mark Takano	D	California 41	January 3, 2013		
310	David Valadao	R	California 21	January 3, 2013		
311	Juan Vargas	D	California 51	January 3, 2013		
312	Marc Veasey	D	Texas 33	January 3, 2013		
313	Filemon Vela Jr.	D	Texas 34	January 3, 2013		
314	Ann Wagner	R	Missouri 2	January 3, 2013		
315	Jackie Walorski	R	Indiana 2	January 3, 2013		
316	Randy Weber	R	Texas 14	January 3, 2013		
317	Brad Wenstrup	R	Ohio 2	January 3, 2013		
318	Roger Williams	R	Texas 25	January 3, 2013		
319	Ted Yoho	R	Florida 3	January 3, 2013		
320	Robin Kelly	D	Illinois 2	April 9, 2013		
321	Jason Smith	R	Missouri 8	June 4, 2013		
322	Katherine Clark	D	Massachusetts 5	December 10, 2013		
323	Bradley Byrne	R	Alabama 1	December 17, 2013		
324	Alma Adams	D	North Carolina 12	November 4, 2014		
325	Dave Brat	R	Virginia 7	November 4, 2014		
326	Donald Norcross	D	New Jersey 1	November 4, 2014		
327	Ralph Abraham	R	Louisiana 5	January 3, 2015		
328	Pete Aguilar	D	California 31	January 3, 2015		
329	Rick W. Allen	R	Georgia 12	January 3, 2015		
330	Brian Babin	R	Texas 36	January 3, 2015		
331	Don Beyer	D	Virginia 8	January 3, 2015		
332	Mike Bishop	R	Michigan 8	January 3, 2015		
333	Rod Blum	R	Iowa 1	January 3, 2015		
334	Mike Bost	R	Illinois 12	January 3, 2015		
335	Brendan Boyle	D	Pennsylvania 13	January 3, 2015		
336	Ken Buck	R	Colorado 4	January 3, 2015		
337	Buddy Carter	R	Georgia 1	January 3, 2015		
338	Barbara Comstock	R	Virginia 10	January 3, 2015		
339	Ryan Costello	R	Pennsylvania 6	January 3, 2015		
340	Carlos Curbelo	R	Florida 26	January 3, 2015		
341	Mark DeSaulnier	D	California 11	January 3, 2015		
342	Debbie Dingell	D	Michigan 12	January 3, 2015		
343	Tom Emmer	R	Minnesota 6	January 3, 2015		
344	Ruben Gallego	D	Arizona 7	January 3, 2015		
345	Garret Graves	R	Louisiana 6	January 3, 2015		
346	Glenn Grothman	R	Wisconsin 6	January 3, 2015		
347	Jody Hice	R	Georgia 10	January 3, 2015		
348	French Hill	R	Arkansas 2	January 3, 2015		
349	Will Hurd	R	Texas 23	January 3, 2015		
350	Evan Jenkins	R	West Virginia 3	January 3, 2015		Resigned on September 30, 2018.
351	John Katko	R	New York 24	January 3, 2015		
352	Steve Knight	R	California 25	January 3, 2015		
353	Brenda Lawrence	D	Michigan 14	January 3, 2015		
354	Ted Lieu	D	California 33	January 3, 2015		
355	Barry Loudermilk	R	Georgia 11	January 3, 2015		
356	Mia Love	R	Utah 4	January 3, 2015		
357	Tom MacArthur	R	New Jersey 3	January 3, 2015		
358	Martha McSally	R	Arizona 2	January 3, 2015		
359	John Moolenaar	R	Michigan 4	January 3, 2015		
360	Alex Mooney	R	West Virginia 2	January 3, 2015		
361	Seth Moulton	D	Massachusetts 6	January 3, 2015		
362	Dan Newhouse	R	Washington 4	January 3, 2015		
363	Gary Palmer	R	Alabama 6	January 3, 2015		
364	Bruce Poliquin	R	Maine 2	January 3, 2015		
365	John Ratcliffe	R	Texas 4	January 3, 2015		
366	Kathleen Rice	D	New York 4	January 3, 2015		
367	David Rouzer	R	North Carolina 7	January 3, 2015		
368	Steve Russell	R	Oklahoma 5	January 3, 2015		
369	Elise Stefanik	R	New York 21	January 3, 2015		
370	Norma Torres	D	California 35	January 3, 2015		
371	Dave Trott	R	Michigan 11	January 3, 2015		
372	Mark Walker	R	North Carolina 6	January 3, 2015		
373	Mimi Walters	R	California 45	January 3, 2015		
374	Bonnie Watson Coleman	D	New Jersey 12	January 3, 2015		
375	Bruce Westerman	R	Arkansas 4	January 3, 2015		
376	David Young	R	Iowa 3	January 3, 2015		
377	Lee Zeldin	R	New York 1	January 3, 2015		
378	Ryan Zinke	R	Montana at-large	January 3, 2015		Resigned on March 1, 2017.
379	Dan Donovan	R	New York 11	May 5, 2015		
380	Trent Kelly	R	Mississippi 1	June 2, 2015		
381	Darin LaHood	R	Illinois 18	September 10, 2015		
382	Warren Davidson	R	Ohio 8	June 7, 2016		
383	James Comer	R	Kentucky 1	November 8, 2016		
384	Dwight Evans	D	Pennsylvania 2	November 8, 2016		
385	Brad Schneider	D	Illinois 10	January 3, 2017	2013–2015	
386	Jodey Arrington	R	Texas 19	January 3, 2017		
387	Don Bacon	R	Nebraska 2	January 3, 2017		
388	Jim Banks	R	Indiana 3	January 3, 2017		
389	Nanette Barragán	D	California 44	January 3, 2017		
390	Jack Bergman	R	Michigan 1	January 3, 2017		
391	Andy Biggs	R	Arizona 5	January 3, 2017		
392	Lisa Blunt Rochester	D	Delaware at-large	January 3, 2017		
393	Anthony Brown	D	Maryland 4	January 3, 2017		
394	Ted Budd	R	North Carolina 13	January 3, 2017		
395	Salud Carbajal	D	California 24	January 3, 2017		
396	Liz Cheney	R	Wyoming at-large	January 3, 2017		
397	Lou Correa	D	California 46	January 3, 2017		
398	Charlie Crist	D	Florida 13	January 3, 2017		
399	Val Demings	D	Florida 10	January 3, 2017		
400	Neal Dunn	R	Florida 2	January 3, 2017		
401	Adriano Espaillat	D	New York 13	January 3, 2017		
402	John Faso	R	New York 19	January 3, 2017		
403	Drew Ferguson	R	Georgia 3	January 3, 2017		
404	Brian Fitzpatrick	R	Pennsylvania 8	January 3, 2017		
405	Matt Gaetz	R	Florida 1	January 3, 2017		
406	Mike Gallagher	R	Wisconsin 8	January 3, 2017		
407	Tom Garrett	R	Virginia 5	January 3, 2017		
408	Vicente Gonzalez	D	Texas 15	January 3, 2017		
409	Josh Gottheimer	D	New Jersey 5	January 3, 2017		
410	Clay Higgins	R	Louisiana 3	January 3, 2017		
411	Trey Hollingsworth	R	Indiana 9	January 3, 2017		
412	Pramila Jayapal	D	Washington 7	January 3, 2017		
413	Mike Johnson	R	Louisiana 4	January 3, 2017		
414	Ro Khanna	D	California 17	January 3, 2017		
415	Ruben Kihuen	D	Nevada 4	January 3, 2017		
416	Raja Krishnamoorthi	D	Illinois 8	January 3, 2017		
417	David Kustoff	R	Tennessee 8	January 3, 2017		
418	Al Lawson	D	Florida 5	January 3, 2017		
419	Jason Lewis	R	Minnesota 2	January 3, 2017		
420	Roger Marshall	R	Kansas 1	January 3, 2017		
421	Brian Mast	R	Florida 18	January 3, 2017		
422	Donald McEachin	D	Virginia 4	January 3, 2017		
423	Paul Mitchell	R	Michigan 10	January 3, 2017		
424	Stephanie Murphy	D	Florida 7	January 3, 2017		
425	Tom O'Halleran	D	Arizona 1	January 3, 2017		
426	Jimmy Panetta	D	California 20	January 3, 2017		
427	Jamie Raskin	D	Maryland 8	January 3, 2017		
428	Francis Rooney	R	Florida 19	January 3, 2017		
429	Jacky Rosen	D	Nevada 3	January 3, 2017		
430	John Rutherford	R	Florida 4	January 3, 2017		
431	Lloyd Smucker	R	Pennsylvania 16	January 3, 2017		
432	Darren Soto	D	Florida 9	January 3, 2017		
433	Thomas Suozzi	D	New York 3	January 3, 2017		
434	Scott Taylor	R	Virginia 2	January 3, 2017		
435	Claudia Tenney	R	New York 22	January 3, 2017		
	Ron Estes	R	Kansas 4	April 11, 2017		
	Greg Gianforte	R	Montana at-large	May 25, 2017		
	Jimmy Gomez	D	California 34	June 6, 2017		
	Karen Handel	R	Georgia 6	June 20, 2017		
	Ralph Norman	R	South Carolina 5	June 20, 2017		
	John Curtis	R	Utah 3	November 7, 2017		
	Conor Lamb	D	Pennsylvania 18	March 13, 2018		
	Debbie Lesko	R	Arizona 8	April 24, 2018		
	Michael Cloud	R	Texas 27	June 30, 2018		
	Troy Balderson	R	Ohio 12	August 7, 2018		
	Kevin Hern	R	Oklahoma 1	November 6, 2018		
	Brenda Jones	D	Michigan 13	November 6, 2018		
	Joseph Morelle	D	New York 25	November 6, 2018		
	Mary Gay Scanlon	D	Pennsylvania 7	November 6, 2018		
	Susan Wild	D	Pennsylvania 15	November 6, 2018		

== Delegates ==
Rank	Delegate	Party	District	Seniority date (Previous service, if any)	Notes
1	Eleanor Holmes Norton	D	District of Columbia at-large	January 3, 1991	
2	Madeleine Bordallo	D	Guam at-large	January 3, 2003	
3	Gregorio Sablan	I	Northern Mariana Islands at-large	January 3, 2009	
4	Stacey Plaskett	D	United States Virgin Islands at-large	January 3, 2015	
5	Amata Coleman Radewagen	R	American Samoa at-large	January 3, 2015	
6	Jenniffer González	NPP/R	Puerto Rico at-large	January 3, 2017	

== See also ==
- 115th United States Congress
- List of current United States representatives
- List of United States congressional districts
- List of United States senators in the 115th Congress
- Seniority in the United States House of Representatives
