= 2018 Texas's 27th congressional district special election =

- June 30, 2018

Texas's 27th congressional district
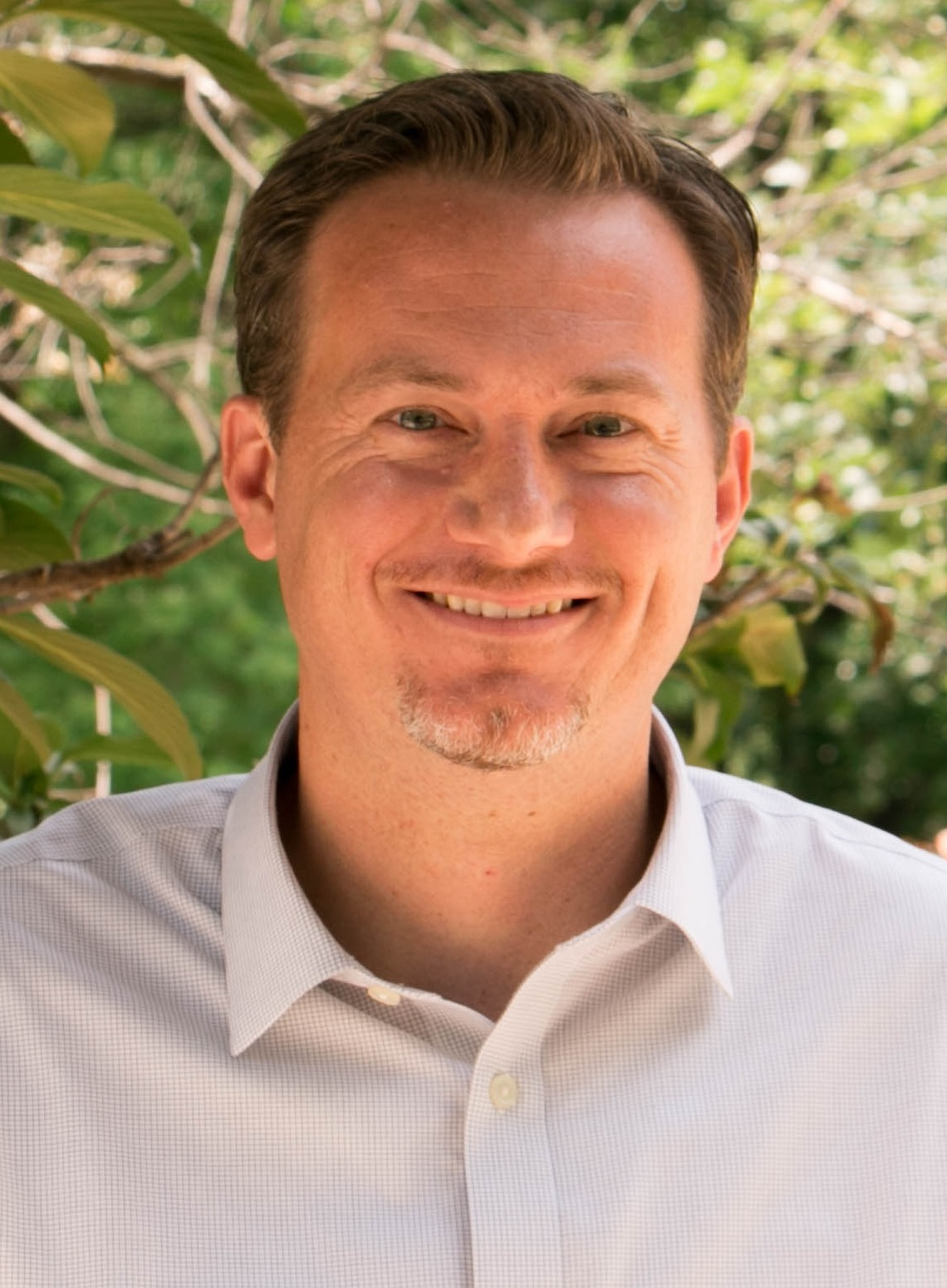

Nominee	Michael Cloud	Eric Holguin
Party	Republican	Democratic
Popular vote	19,872	11,599
Percentage	54.8%	32.0%
- County results Cloud: 40–50% 50–60% 60–70% 70–80%
U.S. Representative before election
Blake Farenthold
Republican
Elected U.S. Representative
Michael Cloud
Republican

A special election for Texas's 27th congressional district was held on June 30, 2018, following the resignation of Rep. Blake Farenthold. Republican Michael Cloud won with about 54.7% of the vote, crossing the 50% threshold needed to avoid a runoff. Running again against Eric Holguin in the general election, he won a full term.

== Background ==
The district has been reliably Republican; President Donald Trump carried it by a more-than-20-point margin in 2016.

Rep. Blake Farenthold resigned on April 6, 2018, due to allegations of sexual harassment, therefore a special election was needed in order to fill this seat until the 2018 midterms. Consequently, on April 23, 2018, Texas Attorney General Ken Paxton approved of Governor Greg Abbott's plan to call a special election.

Michael Cloud won this election, and served the remainder of Farenthold's term in the 115th Congress, until January 2019. He previously won the Republican runoff for the same seat, so he appeared on the November ballot and went on to win the general election.

== Candidates ==
=== Republican Party ===
==== Declared ====
- Michael Cloud, former Victoria County Republican Party chairman
- Marty Perez

==== Withdrawn ====
- Bech Bruun (Note: Bech Bruun (R) suspended his campaign, but remained on the ballot.)

=== Democratic Party ===
==== Declared ====
- Raul (Roy) Barrera
- Eric Holguin
- Mike Westergren

=== Libertarian Party ===
==== Declared ====
- Daniel Tinus

=== Independents ===
==== Declared ====
- Judith Cutright
- Christopher Suprun

=== Endorsements ===
Michael Cloud

State officials

- Greg Abbott, Texas governor

Individuals

- Bech Bruun, suspended his campaign for the seat

Organizations

- Tea Party Express

=== Results ===
Texas' 27th congressional district special election, 2018
Party	Candidate	Votes	%
Republican	Michael Cloud	19,872	54.8
Democratic	Eric Holguin	11,599	32.0
Democratic	Raul (Roy) Barrera	1,748	4.8
Republican	Bech Bruun (withdrawn)	1,571	4.3
Democratic	Mike Westergren	858	2.4
Republican	Marty Perez	276	0.8
Independent	Judith Cutright	172	0.5
Libertarian	Daniel Tinus	144	0.4
Independent	Christopher Suprun	51	0.1
Total votes		36,268	100.0
Republican hold			
