= Solomon Ortiz =

American politician (born 1937)

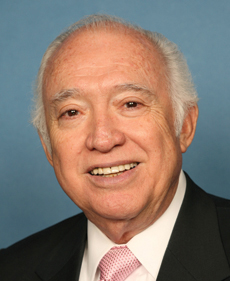

Member of the U.S. House of Representatives from Texas's 27th district
- In office January 3, 1983 – January 3, 2011
- Preceded by: Constituency established
- Succeeded by: Blake Farenthold

Personal details
- Born: Solomon Porfirio Ortiz; June 3, 1937 (age 89) Robstown, Texas, U.S.
- Party: Democratic
- Education: Del Mar College (attended)

Military service
- Branch/service: United States Army
- Years of service: 1960–1962
- Ortiz's voice Ortiz on the 1999 Jiji earthquake. Recorded September 28, 1999

Solomon Porfirio Ortiz (born June 3, 1937) is an American former politician who served as the U.S. representative for Texas's 27th congressional district, based in Corpus Christi, serving from 1983 until 2011. He is a member of the Democratic Party. In 2010, Ortiz was narrowly defeated by Republican challenger Blake Farenthold.

== Early life, education, and business career ==
Solomon Ortiz was born in Robstown, Nueces County, Texas; his family had immigrated from Mexico. Ortiz was raised by José Ortiz and Feliciana Ochoa Ortiz, his father and mother, respectively. He grew up in a neighborhood called Cantarranas, or "singing frogs," made of Hispanics and Blacks during a time where discrimination was prevalent in his community. At a young age, Ortiz helped his family make money by picking cotton away from his hometown in West Texas before school started. As he grew up, Ortiz held several jobs, including working as a shoeshiner and an ink fogger for The Robstown Record's letter press. Ortiz befriended, and became fascinated with, law enforcement officers. He attended Robstown High School until the age of 19, when he dropped out after his father's death to help support his family by working for Robstown Record as a printing assistant. Then, Ortiz attended Del Mar College from 1965 to 1967.

Ortiz joined the United States Army in 1960, to support his working mother after his father's passing, serving two years and earning his GED. He received basic training at Fort Hood, Texas, and served a tour of duty in Verdun and Vitry-le-François, France. Expressing his interest in law enforcement, Ortiz was reassigned to the 61st Military Police Company Criminal Investigation Office and received advanced military police training at Fort Gordon, Georgia.

After returning to South Texas, Ortiz worked for three years as an insurance agent.

In 1970, Ortiz married Irme Roldan and had 2 children: Yvette and Solomon Jr. However, Ortiz and Roldan divorced.

== Early political career ==
In 1964, with the help of his mother's loan of $600 to pay for a filing fee, he was urged by friends to run for Nueces County constable, and was elected in 1965, defeating the incumbent in a runoff election. He was elected to the county commissioners court of Nueces County in 1969, the first Hispanic to serve in that capacity. He remained in that position until 1976, when he was elected county sheriff, another first for a Hispanic in Nueces County. In 1982, Ortiz resigned as sheriff to run for Congress.

== U.S. House of Representatives ==
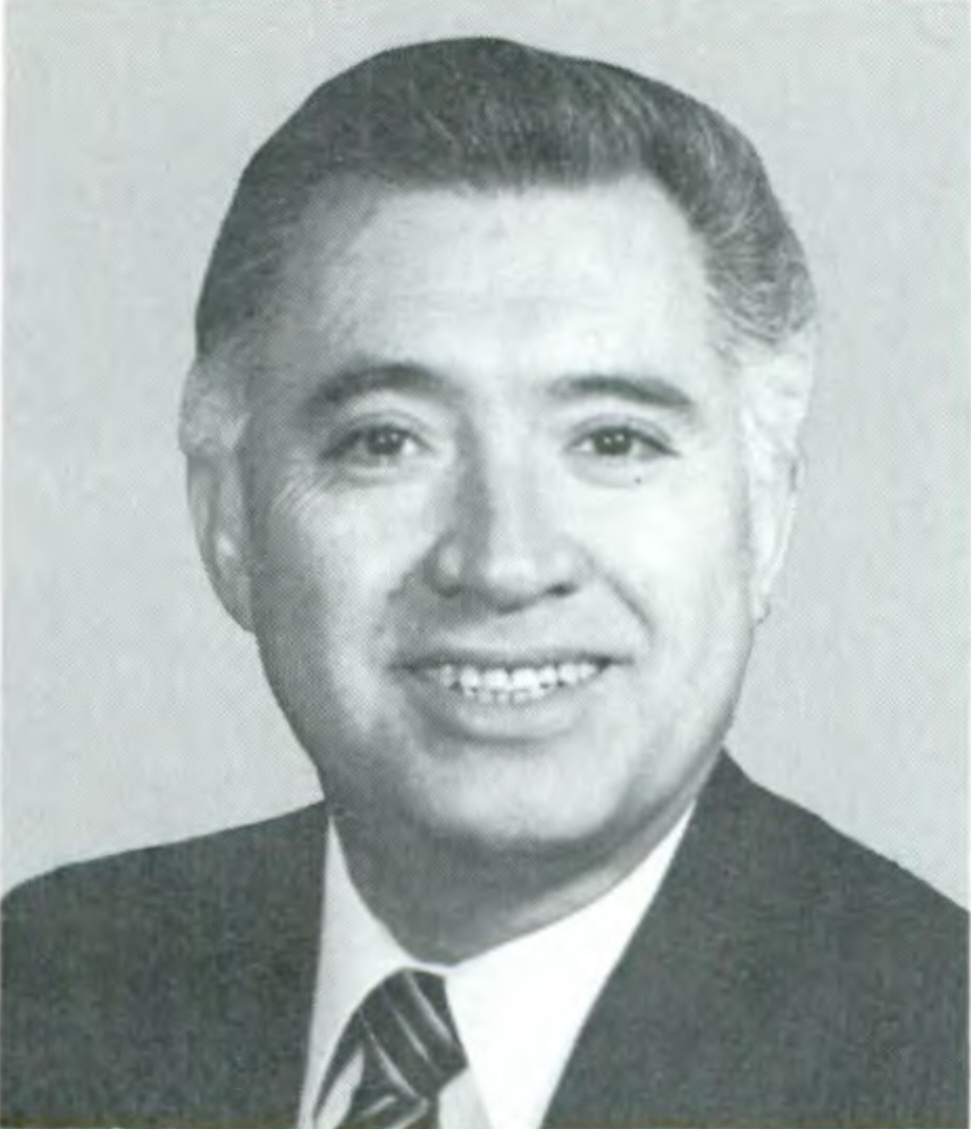
Ortiz's official portrait in the 102nd United States Congress

=== Elections ===
When the 27th District was created in 1982, Ortiz ran for the seat on a platform of jobs incentives and attention to education. He won the Democratic primary run-off election with 52% of the vote, defeating Republican State Representative Joe Salem. In the general election, he won with 64% of the vote. From 1986 to 1996, Ortiz would run without any competitive opposition in the Democratic primary, 10 years after his first election.

Ortiz won re-election 13 times, dipping below 60% of the vote only four times before 2010. His lowest winning percentage was in 1992, when he defeated Republican Jay Kimbrough 55%-43%.

2010

On November 2, election night, Ortiz appeared to have lost to the Republican challenger, Blake Farenthold, but Ortiz requested a recount. Ortiz conceded after the November 22 recount. Farenthold narrowly defeated him 47.8%-47.1%, by a margin of just 770 votes. While Ortiz had won four of the district's six counties, he lost the two northernmost counties, San Patricio and his home county of Nueces. The district was significantly redrawn after the 2010 census, and no Democrat has managed even 40 percent of the vote since Ortiz' defeat.

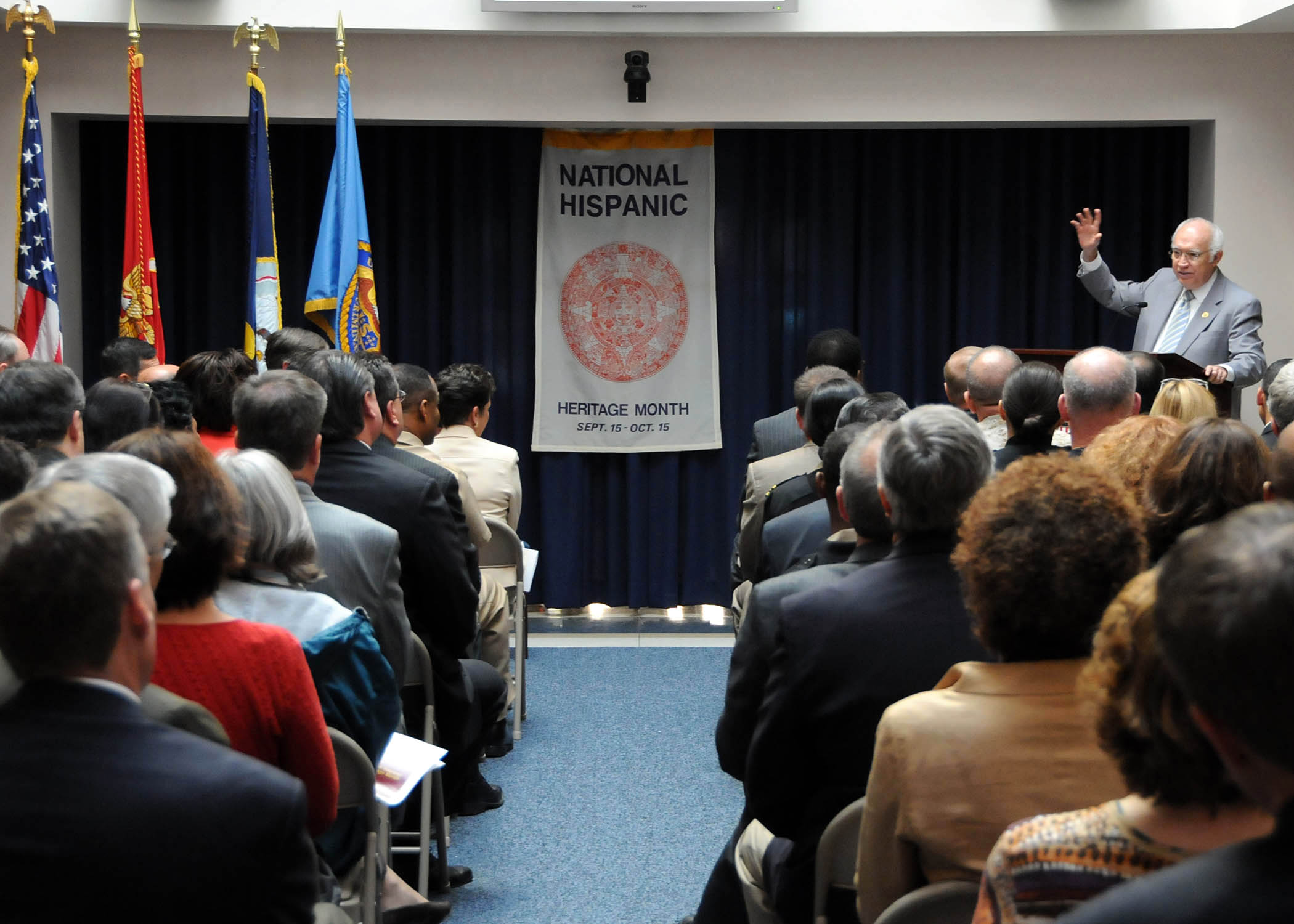
Ortiz speaking to an audience during National Hispanic Heritage Month

=== Tenure ===
Ortiz is a Democratic moderate. He is socially conservative, but economically liberal. For example, he is anti-abortion, but usually voted with his party on economic issues. He voted in favor of the Affordable Care Act, and voted against the Repeal of the Don't Ask, Don't Tell.

=== Committee assignments ===
111th Congress

- Committee on Armed Services
  - Subcommittee on Readiness (Chair)
  - Subcommittee on Seapower and Expeditionary Forces
- Committee on Transportation and Infrastructure
  - Subcommittee on Aviation
  - Subcommittee on Highways and Transit
  - Subcommittee on Water Resources and Environment

Previous committees

In 1983, as a freshman congressman, he was assigned to the U.S. Select Committee on Narcotics Abuse and Control. In 1993, Ortiz was named chairman of a House subcommittee that oversees the Gulf of Mexico.

== See also ==
- List of Hispanic and Latino Americans in the United States Congress

U.S. House of Representatives
New constituency	Member of the U.S. House of Representatives from Texas's 27th congressional district 1983–2011	Succeeded by Blake Farenthold
Preceded by Kika de la Garza	Chair of the Congressional Hispanic Caucus; 1990–1993	Succeeded by José E. Serrano
U.S. order of precedence (ceremonial)
Preceded by Peter T. King as Former U.S. Representative	Order of precedence of the United States as Former U.S. Representative	Succeeded by Bill Thomas as Former U.S. Representative
