= Texas's 27th congressional district =

U.S. House district for Texas

Coordinates: 28°46′59″N 96°50′29″W

- Interactive map of district boundaries
- Representative: Michael Cloud; R–Victoria
- Distribution: 74.99% urban; 25.01% rural
- Population (2025): 802,256
- Median household income: $75,455
- Ethnicity: 53.6% Hispanic; 37.9% White; 4.1% Black; 2.2% Two or more races; 1.7% Asian; 0.7% other
- Cook PVI: R+14

Texas's 27th congressional district of the United States House of Representatives covers the coastal bend of Texas's Gulf Coast consisting of Corpus Christi and Victoria up to Bastrop County near Austin. Its current representative is Republican Michael Cloud. Cloud was elected to the district in a special election on June 30, 2018, to replace former Republican representative Blake Farenthold, who had resigned on April 6.

The 27th district was created as a result of the redistricting cycle after the 1980 census.

In 2024, the district was reported to be close to 55% Hispanic, down from the 70% Hispanic population in the 2002–2010 cycles when the district reached from Corpus Christi to Brownsville.

== Significant events ==
In August 2017, a panel of federal judges ruled that the 27th district is unconstitutional, arguing that it displaces a Hispanic-opportunity district. However, the United States Supreme Court later reversed the ruling in 2018, pronouncing the district constitutional in Abbott v. Perez.

On June 30, 2018, a Special Election occurred in the 27th district due to the resigning of Rep. Blake Farenthold. The seat was vacant for about a month before the seat was filled by Rep. Micheal Cloud.

== Recent election results from statewide races ==
=== 2023–2027 boundaries ===
Year	Office	Results
2008	President	McCain 58% - 41%
2012	President	Romney 60% - 40%
2014	Senate	Cornyn 68% - 32%
2014	Governor	Abbott 64% - 36%
2016	President	Trump 59% - 37%
2018	Senate	Cruz 60% - 40%
2018	Governor	Abbott 65% - 34%
2018	Lt. Governor	Patrick 59% - 39%
2018	Attorney General	Paxton 58% - 39%
2018	Comptroller of Public Accounts	Hegar 61% - 36%
2020	President	Trump 61% - 38%
2020	Senate	Cornyn 61% - 37%
2022	Governor	Abbott 64% - 35%
2022	Lt. Governor	Patrick 63% - 34%
2022	Attorney General	Paxton 62% - 35%
2022	Comptroller of Public Accounts	Hegar 64% - 33%
2024	President	Trump 64% - 35%
2024	Senate	Cruz 61% - 37%

=== 2027–2033 boundaries ===
Year	Office	Results
2008	President	McCain 59% - 40%
2012	President	Romney 63% - 37%
2014	Senate	Cornyn 69% - 31%
2014	Governor	Abbott 65% - 35%
2016	President	Trump 60% - 36%
2018	Senate	Cruz 58% - 41%
2018	Governor	Abbott 63% - 36%
2018	Lt. Governor	Patrick 58% - 40%
2018	Attorney General	Paxton 57% - 40%
2018	Comptroller of Public Accounts	Hegar 60% - 37%
2020	President	Trump 58% - 41%
2020	Senate	Cornyn 59% - 39%
2022	Governor	Abbott 60% - 39%
2022	Lt. Governor	Patrick 59% - 38%
2022	Attorney General	Paxton 58% - 39%
2022	Comptroller of Public Accounts	Hegar 62% - 36%
2024	President	Trump 60% - 39%
2024	Senate	Cruz 57% - 40%
2026	Senate	Talarico 51–46%
2026	Governor	Abbott 50–49%

== Current composition ==
For the 118th and successive Congresses (based on redistricting following the 2020 census), the district contains all or portions of the following counties and communities:

Aransas County (6)

All 6 communities

Bastrop County (7)

Bastrop (part; also 10th), Cedar Creek, Mustang Ridge (shared with Caldwell and Travis counties), Red Rock, Rosanky, Smithville (part; also 10th), Wyldwood

Bee County (9)

All 9 communities

Caldwell County (7)

All 7 communities

Calhoun County (6)

All 6 communities

DeWitt County (4)

All 4 communities

Goliad County (1)

Goliad

Gonzales County (4)

All 4 communities

Jackson County (5)

All 5 communities

Lavaca County (4)

All 4 communities

Nueces County (18)

All 18 communities

Refugio County (5)

All 5 communities

San Patricio County (26)

All 26 communities

Victoria County (5)

All 5 communities

== Future composition ==
Beginning with the 2026 election, the 27th district will consist of the following counties:

- Aransas (part)
- Austin
- Bastrop (part)
- Caldwell
- Calhoun
- Colorado
- Fayette
- Hays (part)
- Jackson
- Matagorda
- Nueces (part)
- Refugio (part)
- San Patricio (part)
- Travis (part)
- Victoria
- Washington
- Wharton

== List of members representing the district ==
Member	Party	Years	Cong ress	Electoral history	District location
District established January 3, 1983
Solomon Ortiz (Corpus Christi)	Democratic	January 3, 1983 – January 3, 2011	98th 99th 100th 101st 102nd 103rd 104th 105th 106th 107th 108th 109th 110th 111th	Elected in 1982. Re-elected in 1984. Re-elected in 1986. Re-elected in 1988. Re-elected in 1990. Re-elected in 1992. Re-elected in 1994. Re-elected in 1996. Re-elected in 1998. Re-elected in 2000. Re-elected in 2002. Re-elected in 2004. Re-elected in 2006. Re-elected in 2008. Lost re-election.	
Solomon Ortiz (Corpus Christi)	Democratic	January 3, 1983 – January 3, 2011	98th 99th 100th 101st 102nd 103rd 104th 105th 106th 107th 108th 109th 110th 111th	Elected in 1982. Re-elected in 1984. Re-elected in 1986. Re-elected in 1988. Re-elected in 1990. Re-elected in 1992. Re-elected in 1994. Re-elected in 1996. Re-elected in 1998. Re-elected in 2000. Re-elected in 2002. Re-elected in 2004. Re-elected in 2006. Re-elected in 2008. Lost re-election.	1983–1991; Cameron, Kenedy, Kleberg, and Willacy; almost all of Nueces
Solomon Ortiz (Corpus Christi)	Democratic	January 3, 1983 – January 3, 2011	98th 99th 100th 101st 102nd 103rd 104th 105th 106th 107th 108th 109th 110th 111th	Elected in 1982. Re-elected in 1984. Re-elected in 1986. Re-elected in 1988. Re-elected in 1990. Re-elected in 1992. Re-elected in 1994. Re-elected in 1996. Re-elected in 1998. Re-elected in 2000. Re-elected in 2002. Re-elected in 2004. Re-elected in 2006. Re-elected in 2008. Lost re-election.	1992–2003; Cameron, Kenedy, and Nueces; parts of Kleberg and Willacy
Solomon Ortiz (Corpus Christi)	Democratic	January 3, 1983 – January 3, 2011	98th 99th 100th 101st 102nd 103rd 104th 105th 106th 107th 108th 109th 110th 111th	Elected in 1982. Re-elected in 1984. Re-elected in 1986. Re-elected in 1988. Re-elected in 1990. Re-elected in 1992. Re-elected in 1994. Re-elected in 1996. Re-elected in 1998. Re-elected in 2000. Re-elected in 2002. Re-elected in 2004. Re-elected in 2006. Re-elected in 2008. Lost re-election.	2003–2005; Cameron, Kenedy, and Willacy; parts of Kleberg and Nueces
Solomon Ortiz (Corpus Christi)	Democratic	January 3, 1983 – January 3, 2011	98th 99th 100th 101st 102nd 103rd 104th 105th 106th 107th 108th 109th 110th 111th	Elected in 1982. Re-elected in 1984. Re-elected in 1986. Re-elected in 1988. Re-elected in 1990. Re-elected in 1992. Re-elected in 1994. Re-elected in 1996. Re-elected in 1998. Re-elected in 2000. Re-elected in 2002. Re-elected in 2004. Re-elected in 2006. Re-elected in 2008. Lost re-election.	2005–2013 Kenedy, Kleberg, Nueces, and Willacy; parts of Cameron and San Patricio
Blake Farenthold (Corpus Christi)	Republican	January 3, 2011 – April 6, 2018	112th 113th 114th 115th	Elected in 2010. Re-elected in 2012. Re-elected in 2014. Re-elected in 2016. Resigned.	2005–2013 Kenedy, Kleberg, Nueces, and Willacy; parts of Cameron and San Patricio
Blake Farenthold (Corpus Christi)	Republican	January 3, 2011 – April 6, 2018	112th 113th 114th 115th	Elected in 2010. Re-elected in 2012. Re-elected in 2014. Re-elected in 2016. Resigned.	2013–2023 Aransas, Calhoun, Jackson, Lavaca, Matagorda, Nueces, Refugio, Victoria, and Wharton; parts of Bastrop, Caldwell, Gonzales, and San Patricio
Vacant		April 6, 2018 – June 30, 2018	115th		2013–2023 Aransas, Calhoun, Jackson, Lavaca, Matagorda, Nueces, Refugio, Victoria, and Wharton; parts of Bastrop, Caldwell, Gonzales, and San Patricio
Michael Cloud (Victoria)	Republican	June 30, 2018 – present	115th 116th 117th 118th 119th	Elected to finish Farenthold's term. Re-elected in 2018. Re-elected in 2020. Re-elected in 2022. Re-elected in 2024. Re-elected in 2026.	2013–2023 Aransas, Calhoun, Jackson, Lavaca, Matagorda, Nueces, Refugio, Victoria, and Wharton; parts of Bastrop, Caldwell, Gonzales, and San Patricio
Michael Cloud (Victoria)	Republican	June 30, 2018 – present	115th 116th 117th 118th 119th	Elected to finish Farenthold's term. Re-elected in 2018. Re-elected in 2020. Re-elected in 2022. Re-elected in 2024. Re-elected in 2026.	2023–2027 Aransas, Bastrop (part), Bee, Caldwell, Calhoun, De Witt, Goliad, Gonzales, Jackson, Lavaca, Nueces, Refugio, San Patricio, and Victoria

== Recent election results ==
U.S. House election, 2004: Texas District 27
Party	Candidate	Votes	%	±%
Democratic	Solomon Ortiz (incumbent)	112,081	63.1	+2.0
Republican	William Vaden	61,955	34.9	−1.7
Libertarian	Christopher Claytor	3,500	2.0	−0.4
Majority		60,126	33.9	
Turnout		177,536		
Democratic hold		Swing	+1.8	

U.S. House election, 2010: Texas District 27
Party	Candidate	Votes	%	±%
Republican	Blake Farenthold	50,954	47.85	+12.95
Democratic	Solomon Ortiz (incumbent)	50,155	47.10	−16.0
Majority		799	0.75	
Turnout		101,109		
Republican gain from Democratic		Swing	28.95	

U.S. House election, 2012: Texas District 27
Party	Candidate	Votes	%	±%
Republican	Blake Farenthold (incumbent)	120,684	56.75	+8.9
Democratic	Rose Meza Harrison	83,395	39.21	−7.89
Independent	Bret Baldwin	5,354	2.51	+2.51
Libertarian	Corrie Byrd	3,218	1.51	+1.51
Turnout		212,651		

U.S. House election, 2014: Texas District 27
Party	Candidate	Votes	%	±%
Republican	Blake Farenthold (incumbent)	83,342	63.60	+6.85
Democratic	Wesley Reed	44,152	33.69	−5.52
Libertarian	Roxanne Simonson	3,553	2.71	+1.2
Turnout		131,047		

U.S. House election, 2016: Texas District 27
Party	Candidate	Votes	%	±%
Republican	Blake Farenthold (incumbent)	142,251	61.69	−1.91
Democratic	Raul (Roy) Barrera	88,329	38.31	+4.62
Turnout		230,580		

Texas's 27th congressional district special election, 2018
Party	Candidate	Votes	%
Republican	Michael Cloud	19,856	54.74%
Democratic	Eric Holguin	11,595	31.96%
Democratic	Raul (Roy) Barrera	1,747	4.81%
Republican	Bech Bruun (withdrawn)	1,570	4.32%
Republican	Marty Perez	276	0.76%
Democratic	Mike Westergren	858	2.36%
Independent	Judith Cutright	172	0.47%
Libertarian	Daniel Tinus	144	0.39%
Independent	Christopher Suprun	51	0.14%
Total votes		36,268	100.0

U.S. House election, 2018: Texas District 27
Party	Candidate	Votes	%
Republican	Michael Cloud (incumbent)	125,118	60.32
Democratic	Eric Holguin	75,929	36.61
Libertarian	Daniel Tinus	2,100	1.01
Independent	James Duerr	4,274	2.06
Total votes		207,421	100
Republican hold			

U.S. House election, 2020: Texas District 27
Party	Candidate	Votes	%
Republican	Michael Cloud (incumbent)	172,305	63.1
Democratic	Ricardo "Rick" De La Fuente	95,446	34.9
Libertarian	Phil Gray	5,482	2.0
Total votes		273,253	100.0
Republican hold			

U.S. House election, 2022: Texas District 27
Party	Candidate	Votes	%
Republican	Michael Cloud (incumbent)	133,416	64.4
Democratic	Maclovio Perez	73,611	35.6
Total votes		207,027	100.0
Republican hold			

=== 2024 ===
U.S. House election, 2024: Texas District 27
Party	Candidate	Votes	%
Republican	Michael Cloud (incumbent)	183,980	66.04
Democratic	Tanya Lloyd	94,596	33.96
Total votes		278,576	100.00
Republican hold			

== Historical district boundaries ==
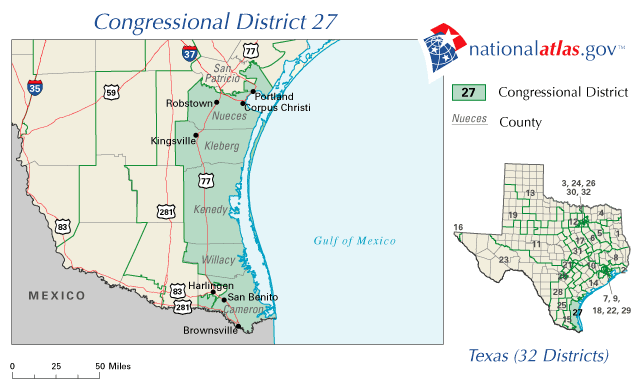
2005–2013

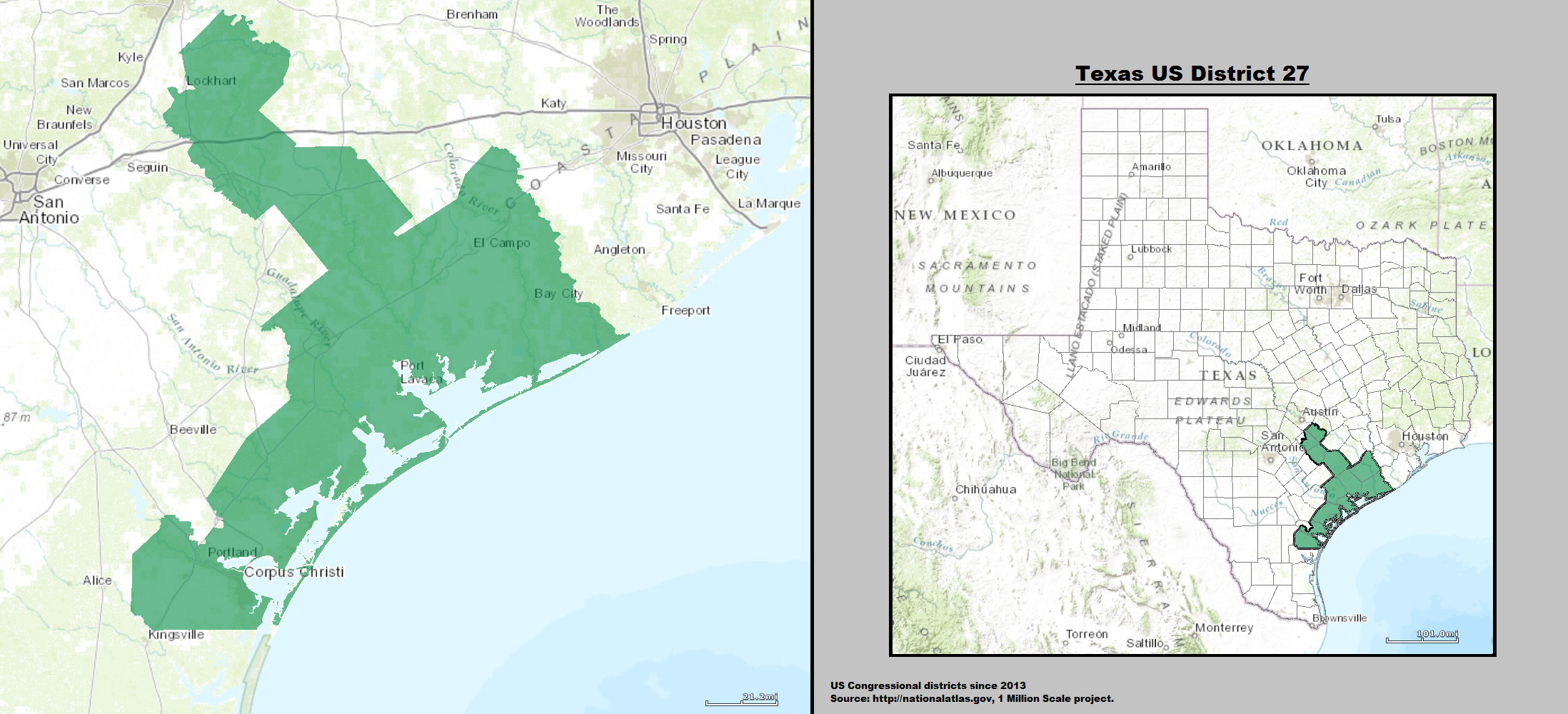
2013–2023

== See also ==
- List of United States congressional districts
