= Michael Cloud =

American politician (born 1975)

Mike Cloud
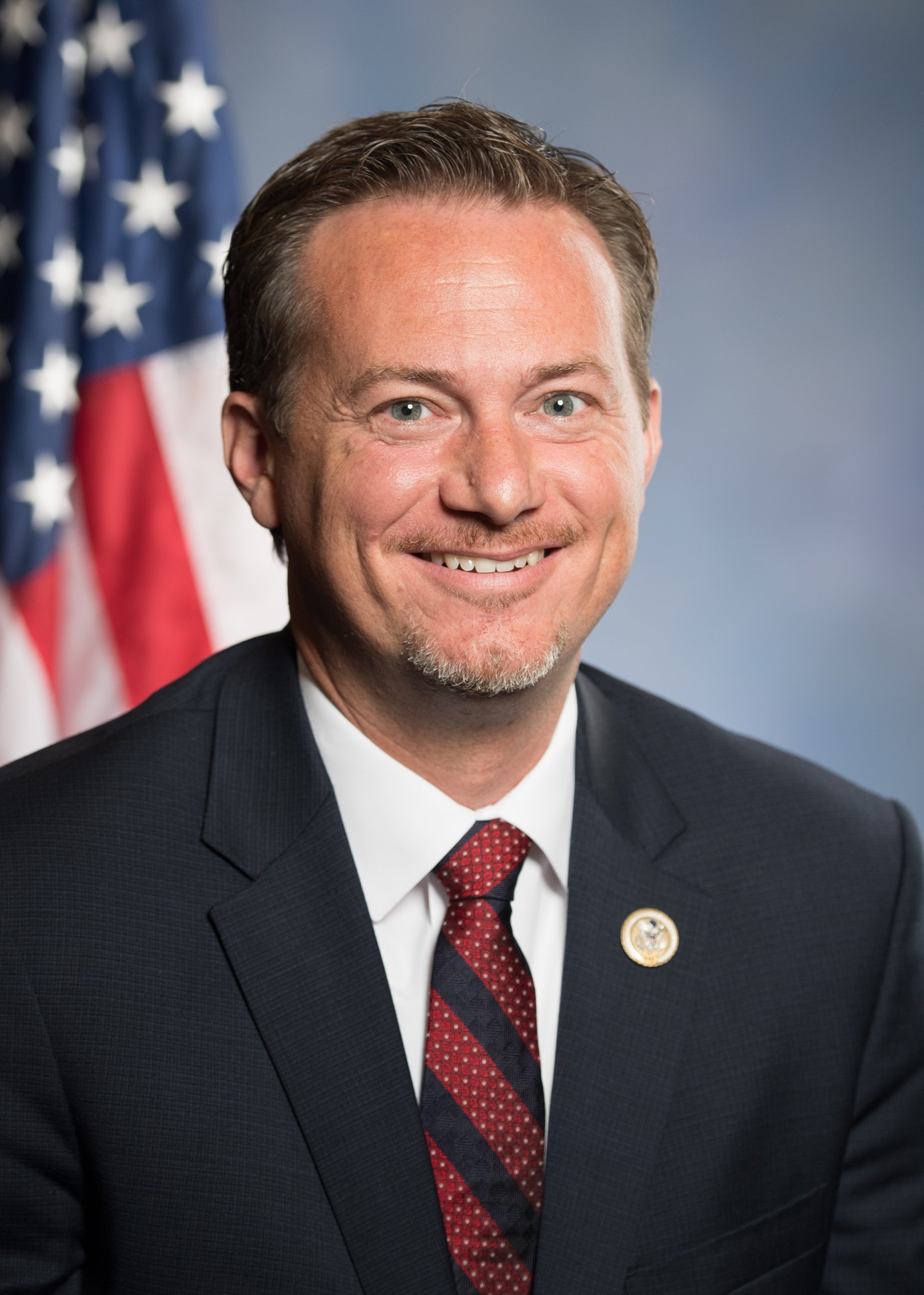
- Official portrait, 2018

Member of the U.S. House of Representatives from Texas's 27th district
- Incumbent
- Assumed office July 10, 2018
- Preceded by: Blake Farenthold

Personal details
- Born: Michael Jonathan Cloud; May 13, 1975 (age 51) Baton Rouge, Louisiana, U.S.
- Party: Republican
- Spouse: Rosel Cloud (m. 1999)
- Children: 3
- Education: Oral Roberts University (BS)
- Website: House website Campaign website

Michael Jonathan Cloud (born May 13, 1975) is an American politician representing Texas's 27th congressional district in the United States House of Representatives since 2018. He is a member of the Republican Party.

Cloud is a member of the new House Department of Government Efficiency Committee.

== Early life and career ==
Cloud graduated from Oral Roberts University in 1997 with a Bachelor of Science in mass media communications. At Oral Roberts, he was on the cross country and track teams. He chaired the Victoria County Republican Party from 2010 to 2017.

== U.S. House of Representatives ==
=== Elections ===
==== 2018 special election ====
Cloud succeeded Republican Blake Farenthold, who resigned amid controversy due to settling a sexual harassment lawsuit with public money. He won the Republican runoff for the regularly scheduled election with help from the Club for Growth and the endorsement of Ron Paul, who had previously represented parts of the district. On June 30, 2018, he won the special election, defeating Democratic nominee Eric Holguin, 55% to 32%.

==== 2018 regular election ====
Cloud defeated Holguin again in November, along with independent candidate James Duerr and Libertarian candidate Daniel Tinus, with 60.3% of the vote.

==== 2020 ====
Cloud defeated Democratic nominee Ricardo "Rick" De La Fuente and Libertarian candidate Phil Gray with 63.1% of the vote.

=== Tenure ===
Cloud was sworn in on July 10, 2018.

In December 2020, Cloud was one of 126 Republican members of the House of Representatives to sign an amicus brief in support of Texas v. Pennsylvania, a lawsuit filed at the United States Supreme Court contesting the results of the 2020 presidential election, in which Joe Biden defeated incumbent Donald Trump. The Supreme Court declined to hear the case on the basis that Texas lacked standing under Article III of the Constitution to challenge the results of an election held by another state.

During the 2021 storming of the United States Capitol, Cloud and his colleagues were ushered to a secure location. Later, video footage of him surfaced in which he refused to wear a mask, in violation of House rules.

On January 3, 2023, at the beginning of the 118th Congress, Cloud voted for Jim Jordan to be the U.S. House speaker, in rebuke of House minority leader Kevin McCarthy.

Cloud voted to provide Israel with support following 2023 Hamas attack on Israel.

==== Iraq ====
In June 2021, Cloud was one of 49 House Republicans to vote to repeal the AUMF against Iraq.

==== Syria ====
In 2023, Cloud was among 47 Republicans to vote in favor of H.Con.Res. 21 which directed President Joe Biden to remove U.S. troops from Syria within 180 days.

==== Immigration ====
Cloud voted against the Further Consolidated Appropriations Act of 2020 which authorizes DHS to nearly double the available H-2B visas for the remainder of FY 2020.

Cloud voted against the Consolidated Appropriations Act (H.R. 1158), which effectively prohibits Immigration and Customs Enforcement from cooperating with the Department of Health and Human Services to detain or remove illegal alien sponsors of Unaccompanied Alien Children. He demanded answers in October 2024 from the Immigration and Customs Enforcement regarding a report that found nearly 300,000 migrant children disappeared from tracking.

On his congressional website he states his wife was naturalized and the process took her seven years which should be improved in order to encourage legal applicants that could benefit the country.

In January 2026, Cloud was named as a founding member of the Sharia-Free America Caucus, which seeks to ban sharia law and prohibit immigration of adherents of sharia (i.e. Muslims). In February 2026, The Council on American Islamic Relations (CAIR) quoted Cloud in a statement designating the Sharia Free America Caucus an anti-Muslim hate group. CAIR stated that the agenda of the caucus "would effectively ban the practice of the world's second largest religion in the United States."

==== Big Tech ====
In 2022, Cloud was one of 39 Republicans to vote for the Merger Filing Fee Modernization Act of 2022, an antitrust package that would crack down on corporations for anti-competitive behavior.

==== Fiscal Responsibility Act of 2023 ====
Cloud was among the 71 Republicans who voted against final passage of the Fiscal Responsibility Act of 2023 in the House.

=== Committee assignments ===
- Appropriations Committee
  - Subcommittee on Financial Services and General Government
  - Subcommittee on Homeland Security
  - Subcommittee on Interior, Environment, and Related Agencies
- Committee on Oversight and Accountability
- Select Subcommittee on the Coronavirus Pandemic

=== Caucus memberships ===
- Congressional Taiwan Caucus
- Freedom Caucus
- Republican Study Committee
- Sharia Free America Caucus

== Electoral history ==
Texas' 27th congressional district special election, 2018
Party	Candidate	Votes	%
Republican	Michael Cloud	19,872	54.8
Democratic	Eric Holguin	11,599	32.0
Democratic	Raul (Roy) Barrera	1,748	4.8
Republican	Bech Bruun (withdrawn)	1,571	4.3
Democratic	Mike Westergren	858	2.4
Republican	Marty Perez	276	0.8
Independent	Judith Cutright	172	0.5
Libertarian	Daniel Tinus	144	0.4
Independent	Christopher Suprun	51	0.1
Total votes		36,268	100.0
Republican hold			

2018 Republican primary results
Party	Candidate	Votes	%
Republican	Bech Bruun	15,845	36.1
Republican	Michael Cloud	14,866	33.9
Republican	Christopher K. Mapp	5,302	12.1
Republican	Jerry Hall	3,616	8.2
Republican	John Grunwald	3,038	6.9
Republican	Eddie Gassman	1,226	2.8
Total votes		43,893	100.0

2018 Republican primary runoff results
Party	Candidate	Votes	%
Republican	Michael Cloud	15,234	61.0
Republican	Bech Bruun	9,723	39.0
Total votes		24,957	100.0

Texas's 27th congressional district election, 2018
Party	Candidate	Votes	%
Republican	Michael Cloud (incumbent)	125,118	60.3
Democratic	Eric Holguin	75,929	36.6
Independent	James Duerr	4,274	2.1
Libertarian	Daniel Tinus	2,100	1.0
Total votes		207,421	100.0
Republican hold			

2020 Republican primary results
Party	Candidate	Votes	%
Republican	Michael Cloud (incumbent)	60,945	100.0
Total votes		60,945	100.0

Texas's 27th congressional district election, 2020
Party	Candidate	Votes	%
Republican	Michael Cloud (incumbent)	172,305	63.1
Democratic	Ricardo "Rick" De La Fuente	95,446	34.9
Libertarian	Phil Gray	5,482	2.0
Total votes		273,253	100.0
Republican hold			

2022 Republican primary results
Party	Candidate	Votes	%
Republican	Michael Cloud (incumbent)	45,741	72.5
Republican	A.J. Louderback	7,704	12.2
Republican	Chris Mapp	4,542	7.2
Republican	Andrew Alvarez	2,648	4.2
Republican	Eric Mireles	2,478	3.9
Total votes		63,113	100.0

Texas's 27th congressional district election, 2022
Party	Candidate	Votes	%
Republican	Michael Cloud (incumbent)	133,416	64.4
Democratic	Maclovio Perez	73,611	35.6
Total votes		207,027	100.0

2024 Republican primary results
Party	Candidate	Votes	%
Republican	Michael Cloud (incumbent)	53,304	74.6
Republican	Scott Mandell	10,791	15.1
Republican	Luis Espindola	3,838	5.4
Republican	Chris Mapp	3,553	5.0
Total votes		71,486	100.0

2024 Texas's 27th congressional district election
Party	Candidate	Votes	%
Republican	Michael Cloud (incumbent)	183,980	66.04
Democratic	Tanya Lloyd	94,596	33.96
Total votes		278,576	100.00
Republican hold			

== Personal life ==
Cloud is Protestant and his wife is a naturalized citizen.

U.S. House of Representatives
Preceded by Blake Farenthold	Member of the U.S. House of Representatives from Texas's 27th congressional district 2018–present	Incumbent
U.S. order of precedence (ceremonial)
Preceded by Ralph Norman	United States representatives by seniority 182nd	Succeeded by Troy Balderson
