= Blake Farenthold =

American politician (1961–2025)

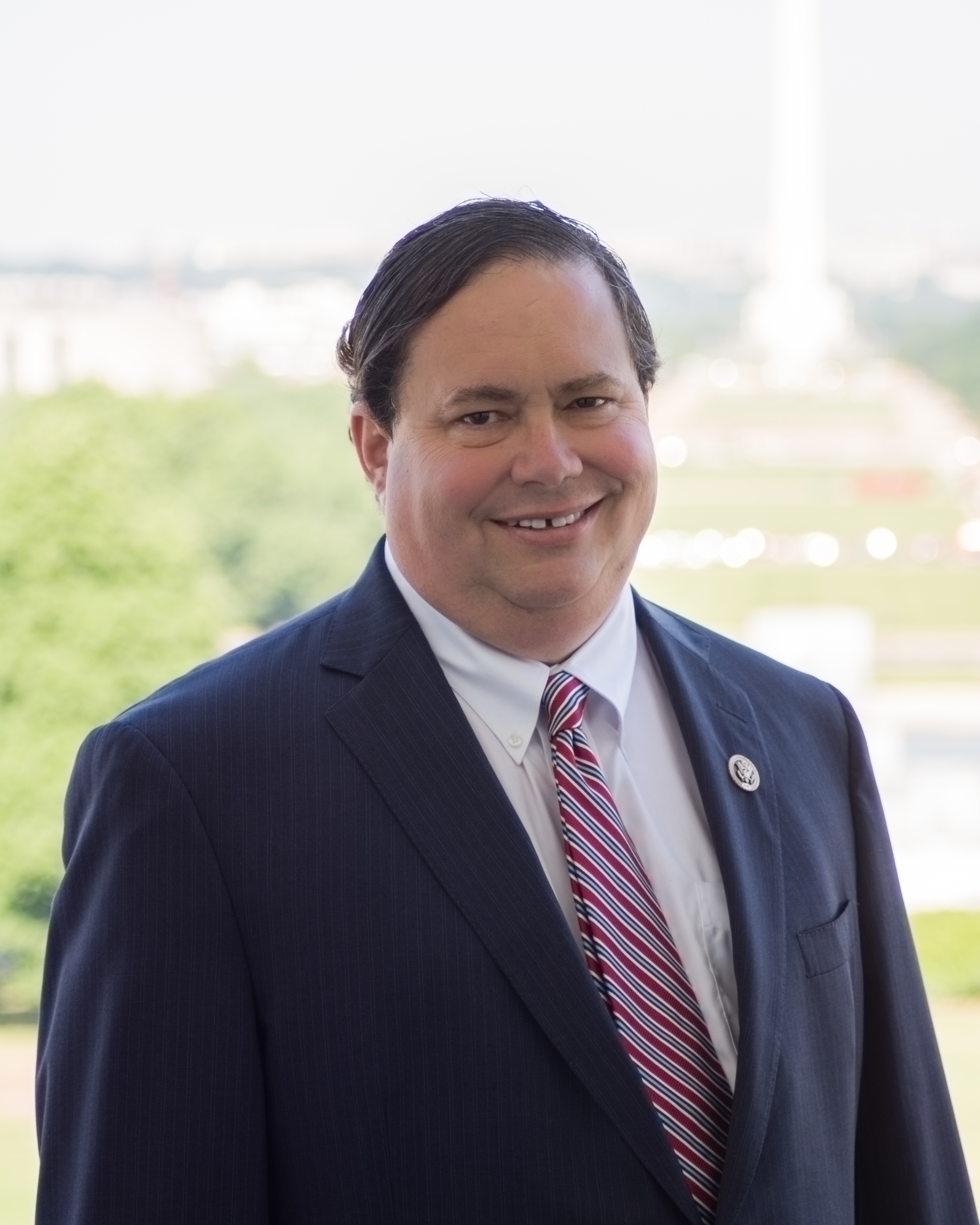
- Official portrait, 2016

Member of the U.S. House of Representatives from Texas's 27th district
- In office January 3, 2011 – April 6, 2018
- Preceded by: Solomon Ortiz
- Succeeded by: Michael Cloud

Personal details
- Born: Randolph Blake Farenthold; December 12, 1961 Corpus Christi, Texas, U.S.
- Died: June 20, 2025 (aged 63) Corpus Christi, Texas, U.S.
- Party: Republican
- Spouse: Debbie Farenthold
- Children: 2
- Education: University of Texas, Austin (BS); St. Mary's University, Texas (JD)

Randolph Blake Farenthold (December 12, 1961 – June 20, 2025) was an American politician and lobbyist. A member of the Republican Party, Farenthold co-hosted a conservative talk-radio program before beginning a career in politics. Farenthold served as the U.S. representative for Texas's 27th congressional district from 2011 until his resignation in April 2018 in the wake of reports he used public funds to settle a sexual harassment lawsuit and had created an intensely hostile work environment for women in his congressional office. Upon resigning, Farenthold pledged to reimburse the US$84,000 in public money that he used to settle the lawsuit. He later reneged on his pledge.

== Early life and education ==
Farenthold was born in Corpus Christi, Texas and grew up there, the son of Mary Sue (née Ogg; 1939–2014) and George Randolph "Randy" Farenthold (1939–1972). His wealthy paternal grandfather, George Edward Farenthold (1915–2000), was a Belgian immigrant descended from an aristocratic industrialist family, and worked in the oil industry in Texas. Blake was the onetime stepgrandson of Frances Farenthold, who married and divorced his grandfather, George Farenthold.

Farenthold attended Incarnate Word Academy and the University of Texas at Austin where he received a Bachelor of Science degree in radio, television, and film. He received a Juris Doctor from St. Mary's University School of Law in San Antonio, and was admitted to the Texas Bar (Bar# 06814500).

== Early career ==
Farenthold was a radio DJ in college. Before running for office, he was a right-wing talk radio host in Corpus Christi (co-hosting Lago in the Morning) and spent seven years at the Kleberg Law Firm, where his stepfather, Hayden Head Sr., was a partner.

== U.S. House of Representatives ==
=== Elections ===
2010

Farenthold defeated incumbent Democratic Rep. Solomon Ortiz by 799 votes on election night. Ortiz asked for a manual recount. On Monday, November 22, Ortiz conceded the race to Farenthold. Farenthold's final margin of victory over Ortiz was 47.85 to 47.1 percent. His margin of victory was 799 votes. Ortiz had represented the district since its creation in 1982.

2012

Redistricting after the 2010 census made Farenthold's district significantly more Republican. His old district had been 70 percent Latino, but the new map shifted most of the Latino areas to the newly created 34th district. To make up for the loss in population, his district was shifted well to the north and east, absorbing some heavily Republican territory near Houston and Austin. He defeated Democratic nominee Rose Meza Harrison 57-39%.

2014

Farenthold was not challenged in the Republican primary. In the general election, he defeated Democrat Wesley Reed by a margin of 83,342 to 44,152 (63.6 to 33.7%).

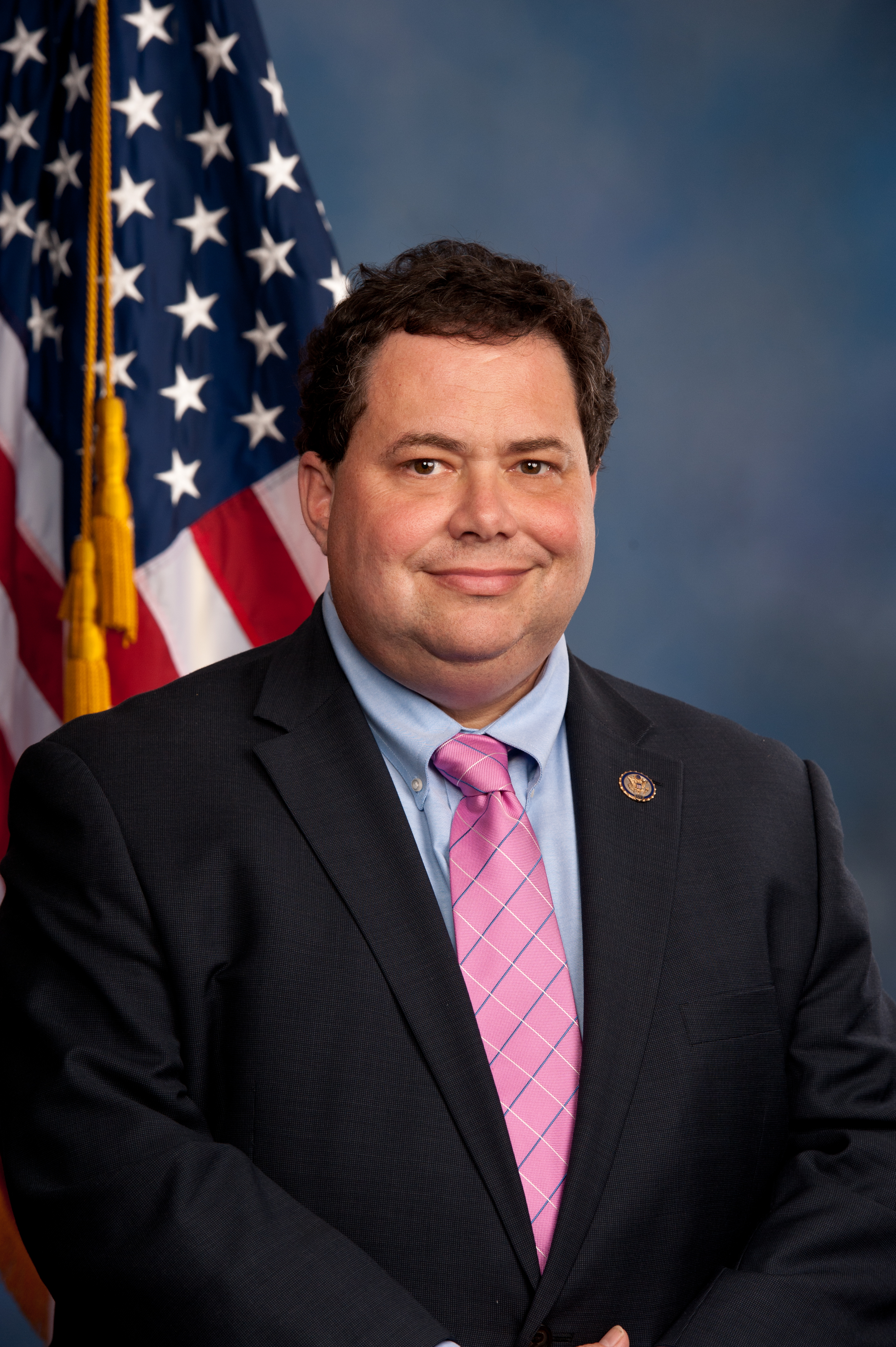
Farenthold's official portrait for the 114th session

2016

Farenthold won renomination in the March 1 Republican primary with 42,872 votes (56%) to 33,699 (44%) for his challenger, Gregg Patrick Deeb (born circa 1964) of Corpus Christi, who had formerly lived in South Carolina. In the general election held on November 8, Farenthold defeated the Democrat Raul "Roy" Barrera, who had won his party nomination on March 1 with 16,140 votes (50.3%) over two opponents. Farenthold polled 142,251 votes (61.7%) to Barrera's 88,329 (38.3%).

Farenthold joined the Republican Study Committee, as well as the Tea Party Caucus. Since redistricting in 2011, his district ran along the middle Texas Gulf Coast from Corpus Christi to Bay City and inland to Luling, and included Aransas, Calhoun, Jackson, Lavaca, Matagorda, Nueces, Refugio, San Patricio, Victoria, Wharton, and parts of Bastrop, Caldwell, and Gonzales Counties.

=== Political positions ===
==== Internet ====
Having used the Internet since the mid-1980s, Farenthold received praise from the online privacy community when he introduced bipartisan legislation that would prevent states from forcing companies to weaken encryption for law enforcement purposes. However, Farenthold voted to repeal an FCC Internet privacy rule that would have prohibited Internet service providers from selling the browsing history of their customers without customers' consent.

==== Donald Trump ====
Farenthold endorsed Trump in the 2016 presidential race. After the Donald Trump and Billy Bush recording was made public, Farenthold was asked what it would take for him to rescind his endorsement, and whether Trump saying "I really like raping women" would be sufficient, Farenthold said that he "would have to consider it." Farenthold later apologized, saying "I do not, and have not ever condoned rape or violence against women. That is not the kind of man I believe Donald Trump to be."

He supported Donald Trump's 2017 executive order to impose a temporary ban on entry to the U.S. to citizens of seven Muslim-majority countries, saying "we must be cautious who we allow into our country."

==== Ethics ====
In January 2017, Farenthold voted in favor of gutting the powers of the Office of Congressional Ethics, supporting a measure that would remove the office's independence by placing it under the jurisdiction of the Republican-led House Ethics Committee. Following a backlash, the decision was reversed.

==== Health care ====
On May 4, 2017, Farenthold voted to repeal the Patient Protection and Affordable Care Act (Obamacare) and pass the American Health Care Act. In a radio interview in July 2017, he said it was "absolutely repugnant" that the Affordable Care Act had not been repealed yet. In particular, he criticized "some female senators from the Northeast," and stated "if it was a guy from south Texas, I might ask him to step outside and settle this Aaron Burr-style."

==== 2016 election conspiracy theories ====
In a May 2017 appearance on CNN, Farenthold publicly doubted the Russian hack of Democratic Party servers and instead promoted a debunked conspiracy theory that the hack was an "inside job." When pressed by journalist John Berman, Farenthold defended his statement by saying that there were "Things circulating on the internet." Farenthold's claim contradicted testimony from former Central Intelligence Agency (CIA) Director John Brennan and the conclusions of the Federal Bureau of Investigation and CIA. Farenthold’s statement was criticized by the editorial board of the Corpus Christi Caller-Times, who called it "Farenthold's latest new low" and said "Farenthold's antics are becoming increasingly cartoonish."

=== Allegations of inappropriate behavior and resignation from Congress ===
==== Lauren Greene ====
In 2014, Farenthold was sued by a former staffer, Lauren Greene, who accused the congressman of gender discrimination, saying that he created a hostile work environment and improperly fired her after she complained. Greene said another Farenthold aide told her the lawmaker said he had "sexual fantasies" and "wet dreams" about Greene. She also claimed that Farenthold "regularly drank to excess" and told her in February 2014 that he was "estranged from his wife and had not had sex with her in years."

When she complained about comments Farenthold and a male staffer made to her, Greene said the congressman improperly fired her. The sexual harassment lawsuit was settled out of court in November 2015 on confidential terms. In December 2017, it was reported that the settlement, for $84,000, was made with taxpayer money.

==== Michael Rekola ====
In December 2017, Michael Rekola, a former senior aide and communications director to Farenthold, alleged that the congressman was verbally abusive and sexually demeaning, and described his congressional office as an intensely hostile environment with Farenthold often making comments about women's physical features, including their breasts or behinds. Past co-workers and relatives have corroborated Rekola's story, some having first-hand accounts of Farenthold subjecting his staff "to a stream of angry behavior... screaming fits of rage, slamming fists on desks and castigating aides", and regularly using profane slurs to describe those who worked in his office. Farenthold denied using sexual insults, but admitted to using vulgar language, claiming that it was "in jest".

==== Resignation from Congress ====
Farenthold announced on December 14, 2017, that he would retire and not seek reelection to his seat in 2018. On April 6, 2018, he suddenly resigned from office.

On April 24, 2018, Texas Governor Greg Abbott ordered an emergency special election for the district. Abbott asked Farenthold to pay the cost for the special election; Farenthold declined to do so. The June 30, 2018 special election to replace Farenthold was won by fellow Republican Michael Cloud. Farenthold rejected calls for him to repay the public funds used to settle a sexual harassment case against him.

== Lobbying career ==
After resigning from Congress, Farenthold announced on May 14, 2018 that he would be serving as the legislative liaison for the Calhoun Port Authority at a salary of $160,000. Farenthold's appointment was questioned because of the reasons for the resignation and because "Revolving Door" laws generally prohibit former representatives from immediately lobbying their recent colleagues. Farenthold resigned as lobbyist for the port authority in January 2019. In May 2019 the board member who directed port staff to hire Farenthold as a lobbyist was defeated for reelection.

== Personal life and death ==
Farenthold had a wife Debbie and their two daughters, Morgan and Amanda who reside in Corpus Christi, Texas. He was an Episcopalian. In 1972, when Farenthold was 10 years old, his father disappeared and was later found dead. His body washed ashore after being weighted down with a cement block and deposited in Corpus Christi Bay. The gangland-style murder was the work of enemies of the elder Farenthold, who feared he would testify against a group of con artists who had tried to defraud him out of $100,000.

Blake Farenthold's health declined at the end of his life due to liver disease, and on June 20, 2025, he died from a heart attack at a hospital in Corpus Christi, at 63.

== Electoral history ==
2010 27th Congressional District of Texas Elections
Party	Candidate	Votes	%
Republican	Blake Farenthold	50,954	47.85
Democratic	Solomon Ortiz (incumbent)	50,155	47.10
Libertarian	Ed Mishou	5,372	5.04
Total votes		106,599	100.0

2012 27th Congressional District of Texas Elections
Party	Candidate	Votes	%
Republican	Blake Farenthold (incumbent)	120,684	56.75
Democratic	Rose Meza Harrison	83,395	39.22
Independent	Bret Baldwin	5,354	2.52
Libertarian	Corrie Byrd	3,218	1.51
Total votes		212,651	100.0

2014 27th Congressional District of Texas Elections
Party	Candidate	Votes	%
Republican	Blake Farenthold (incumbent)	83,342	63.60
Democratic	Wesley Reed	44,152	33.69
Libertarian	Roxanne Simonson	3,553	2.71
Total votes		131,047	100

2016 27th Congressional District of Texas Elections
Party	Candidate	Votes	%
Republican	Blake Farenthold (incumbent)	142,251	61.69
Democratic	Wesley Reed	88,329	38.31
Total votes		230,580	100

U.S. House of Representatives
Preceded by Solomon Ortiz	Member of the U.S. House of Representatives from Texas's 27th congressional district 2011–2018	Succeeded by Michael Cloud
