= Texas's congressional delegations =

Map of Texas's congressional districts since 2023 Interactive map version

Map of Texas's congressional districts as passed by Governor Greg Abbott on August 29, 2025, which will be in use at the 2026 elections after a ruling from the Supreme Court upheld the map and blocked a previous District Court ruling Interactive map version

A long history exists of various individuals serving in the congressional delegations from the State of Texas to the United States House of Representatives and the United States Senate, with all of this occurring after Texas as a territory was annexed as a State in December 1845.

Texas has a total of 38 seats as of 2024. The current dean of the Texas delegation is Representative Lloyd Doggett (TX-37) of the Democratic Party. He has served in the House since 1995 and is 80 years old.

Republicans have complete control of the congressional redistricting process in Texas, as any new maps are drawn and passed by the Republican-held state legislature and signed into law by the Republican governor. This has resulted in Texas’ maps being a partisan gerrymander, with few competitive districts.

== U.S. House of Representatives ==
=== Current districts and representatives ===
The delegation consists of 38 members, with 24 Republicans, 13 Democrats, and 1 vacancy.

Current U.S. representatives from Texas
District	Member (Residence)	Party	Incumbent since	CPVI (2026)	District map
1st	Nathaniel Moran (Whitehouse)	Republican	January 3, 2023	R+24	
2nd	Dan Crenshaw (Atascocita)	Republican	January 3, 2019	R+11	
3rd	Keith Self (McKinney)	Republican	January 3, 2023	R+11	
4th	Pat Fallon (Frisco)	Republican	January 3, 2021	R+12	
5th	Lance Gooden (Sunnyvale)	Republican	January 3, 2019	R+10	
6th	Jake Ellzey (Midlothian)	Republican	July 30, 2021	R+11	
7th	Lizzie Fletcher (Houston)	Democratic	January 3, 2019	D+13	
8th	Morgan Luttrell (Magnolia)	Republican	January 3, 2023	R+13	
9th	Al Green (Houston)	Democratic	January 3, 2005	R+9	
10th	Michael McCaul (Austin)	Republican	January 3, 2005	R+10	
11th	August Pfluger (San Angelo)	Republican	January 3, 2021	R+17	
12th	Craig Goldman (Fort Worth)	Republican	January 3, 2025	R+11	
13th	Ronny Jackson (Amarillo)	Republican	January 3, 2021	R+23	
14th	Randy Weber (Friendswood)	Republican	January 3, 2013	R+12	
15th	Monica De La Cruz (Edinburg)	Republican	January 3, 2023	R+7	
16th	Veronica Escobar (El Paso)	Democratic	January 3, 2019	D+11	
17th	Pete Sessions (Waco)	Republican	January 3, 2021	R+10	
18th	Christian Menefee (Houston)	Democratic	January 31, 2026	D+29	
19th	Jodey Arrington (Lubbock)	Republican	January 3, 2017	R+25	
20th	Joaquin Castro (San Antonio)	Democratic	January 3, 2013	D+16	
21st	Chip Roy (Austin)	Republican	January 3, 2019	R+10	
22nd	Troy Nehls (Richmond)	Republican	January 3, 2021	R+11	
23rd	Vacant		April 14, 2026	R+7	
24th	Beth Van Duyne (Irving)	Republican	January 3, 2021	R+8	
25th	Roger Williams (Weatherford)	Republican	January 3, 2013	R+11	
26th	Brandon Gill (Flower Mound)	Republican	January 3, 2025	R+11	
27th	Michael Cloud (Victoria)	Republican	July 10, 2018	R+10	
28th	Henry Cuellar (Laredo)	Democratic	January 3, 2005	R+3	
29th	Sylvia Garcia (Houston)	Democratic	January 3, 2019	D+17	
30th	Jasmine Crockett (Dallas)	Democratic	January 3, 2023	D+25	
31st	John Carter (Round Rock)	Republican	January 3, 2003	R+11	
32nd	Julie Johnson (Farmers Branch)	Democratic	January 3, 2025	R+8	
33rd	Marc Veasey (Fort Worth)	Democratic	January 3, 2013	D+18	
34th	Vicente Gonzalez (McAllen)	Democratic	January 3, 2017	R+3	
35th	Greg Casar (Austin)	Democratic	January 3, 2023	R+4	
36th	Brian Babin (Woodville)	Republican	January 3, 2015	R+12	
37th	Lloyd Doggett (Austin)	Democratic	January 3, 1995	D+30	
38th	Wesley Hunt (Houston)	Republican	January 3, 2023	R+10	

=== Recent historical district boundaries ===
Below is a table of United States congressional district boundary maps for the State of Texas, presented chronologically. All 10 redistricting events that took place in Texas in the decades between 1973 and 2013 are illustrated here.

Year	Statewide map
1973–1975	
1975–1983	
1983–1985	
1985–1993	
1993–1997	
1997–2003	
2003–2005	
2005–2007	
2007–2013	
2013–2023	
2023–Present	

=== 1845 to 1863: 2 seats ===
Upon statehood, Texas was apportioned two seats.

Congress	1st district	2nd district
29th (1845–1847)	David S. Kaufman (D)	Timothy Pilsbury (D)
30th (1847–1849)	David S. Kaufman (D)	Timothy Pilsbury (D)
31st (1849–1851)	David S. Kaufman (D)	Volney Howard (D)
32nd (1851–1853)	Richardson A. Scurry (D)	Volney Howard (D)
33rd (1853–1855)	George W. Smyth (D)	Peter Hansborough Bell (D)
34th (1855–1857)	Lemuel D. Evans (KN)	Peter Hansborough Bell (D)
35th (1857–1859)	John H. Reagan (D)	Guy M. Bryan (D)
36th (1859–1861)	John H. Reagan (D)	Andrew Jackson Hamilton (ID)
37th (1861–1863)	American Civil War	

=== 1863 to 1873: 4 seats ===
After the 1860 United States census, Texas gained two seats.

Congress	1st district	2nd district	3rd district	4th district
38, 39, 40th (1863–1869)	American Civil War			
41st (1869–1871)	American Civil War			
41st (1869–1871)	George W. Whitmore (R)	John C. Conner (D)	William Thomas; Clark (R)	Edward Degener (R)
42nd (1871–1873)	William S. Herndon (D)	John C. Conner (D)	William Thomas; Clark (R)	John Hancock (D)
42nd (1871–1873)	William S. Herndon (D)	John C. Conner (D)	D. C. Giddings (D)	John Hancock (D)

=== 1873 to 1883: 6 seats ===
After the 1870 United States census, Texas gained two seats. At first, the state used at-large seats, but after 1875 all the seats were districted.

Congress	1st district	2nd district	3rd district	4th district	At-large seat A	At-large seat B
43rd (1873–1875)	William S. Herndon (D)	William P. McLean (D)	D. C. Giddings (D)	John Hancock (D)	Roger Q. Mills (D)	Asa H. Willie (D)
44th (1875–1877)	John H. Reagan (D)	David B. Culberson (D)	James W. Throckmorton (D)	Roger Q. Mills (D)	5th district	6th district
44th (1875–1877)	John H. Reagan (D)	David B. Culberson (D)	James W. Throckmorton (D)	Roger Q. Mills (D)	John Hancock (D)	Gustav Schleicher (D)
45th (1877–1879)	John H. Reagan (D)	David B. Culberson (D)	James W. Throckmorton (D)	Roger Q. Mills (D)	D. C. Giddings (D)	Gustav Schleicher (D)
46th (1879–1881)	John H. Reagan (D)	David B. Culberson (D)	Olin Wellborn (D)	Roger Q. Mills (D)	George Washington; Jones (GB)	Christopher C. Upson (D)
47th (1881–1883)	John H. Reagan (D)	David B. Culberson (D)	Olin Wellborn (D)	Roger Q. Mills (D)	George Washington; Jones (GB)	Christopher C. Upson (D)

=== 1883 to 1893: 11 seats ===
After the 1880 United States census, Texas gained five seats.

Congress	District										
Congress	1st	2nd	3rd	4th	5th	6th	7th	8th	9th	10th	11th
48th (1883–1885)	Charles; Stewart (D)	John H. Reagan (D)	James H. Jones (D)	David B. Culberson (D)	James W. Throckmorton (D)	Olin; Wellborn (D)	Thomas Ochiltree (I)	James Francis; Miller (D)	Roger Q. Mills (D)	John Hancock (D)	S. W. T. Lanham (D)
49th (1885–1887)	Charles; Stewart (D)	John H. Reagan (D)	James H. Jones (D)	David B. Culberson (D)	James W. Throckmorton (D)	Olin; Wellborn (D)	William H. Crain (D)	James Francis; Miller (D)	Roger Q. Mills (D)	Joseph D. Sayers (D)	S. W. T. Lanham (D)
50th (1887–1889)	Charles; Stewart (D)	Howdy; Martin (D)	Constantine; B. Kilgore (D)	David B. Culberson (D)	Silas Hare (D)	Jo; Abbott (D)	William H. Crain (D)	Littleton W. Moore (D)	Roger Q. Mills (D)	Joseph D. Sayers (D)	S. W. T. Lanham (D)
51st (1889–1891)	Charles; Stewart (D)	Howdy; Martin (D)	Constantine; B. Kilgore (D)	David B. Culberson (D)	Silas Hare (D)	Jo; Abbott (D)	William H. Crain (D)	Littleton W. Moore (D)	Roger Q. Mills (D)	Joseph D. Sayers (D)	S. W. T. Lanham (D)
52nd (1891–1893)	Charles; Stewart (D)	John B. Long (D)	Constantine; B. Kilgore (D)	David B. Culberson (D)	Joseph W. Bailey (D)	Jo; Abbott (D)	William H. Crain (D)	Littleton W. Moore (D)	Roger Q. Mills (D)	Joseph D. Sayers (D)	S. W. T. Lanham (D)
52nd (1891–1893)	Charles; Stewart (D)	John B. Long (D)	Constantine; B. Kilgore (D)	David B. Culberson (D)	Joseph W. Bailey (D)	Jo; Abbott (D)	William H. Crain (D)	Littleton W. Moore (D)	Edwin Antony (D)	Joseph D. Sayers (D)	S. W. T. Lanham (D)

=== 1893 to 1903: 13 seats ===
After the 1890 United States census, Texas gained two seats.

Congress	District										District		
Congress	1st	2nd	3rd	4th	5th	6th	7th	8th	9th	10th	11th	12th	13th
53rd (1893–1895)	Joseph C. Hutcheson (D)	Samuel B. Cooper (D)	Constantine B. Kilgore (D)	David B. Culberson (D)	Joseph; W. Bailey (D)	Jo; Abbott (D)	George C. Pendleton (D)	Charles K. Bell (D)	Joseph D. Sayers (D)	Walter; Gresham (D)	William H. Crain (D)	Thomas M. Paschal (D)	Jeremiah V. Cockrell (D)
54th (1895–1897)	Joseph C. Hutcheson (D)	Samuel B. Cooper (D)	C. H. Yoakum (D)	David B. Culberson (D)	Joseph; W. Bailey (D)	Jo; Abbott (D)	George C. Pendleton (D)	Charles K. Bell (D)	Joseph D. Sayers (D)	Miles; Crowley (D)	William H. Crain (D)	George H. Noonan (R)	Jeremiah V. Cockrell (D)
54th (1895–1897)	Joseph C. Hutcheson (D)	Samuel B. Cooper (D)	C. H. Yoakum (D)	David B. Culberson (D)	Joseph; W. Bailey (D)	Jo; Abbott (D)	George C. Pendleton (D)	Charles K. Bell (D)	Joseph D. Sayers (D)	Miles; Crowley (D)	Rudolph; Kleberg (D)	George H. Noonan (R)	Jeremiah V. Cockrell (D)
55th (1897–1899)	Thomas; H. Ball (D)	Samuel B. Cooper (D)	Reese C. De Graffenreid (D)	John W. Cranford (D)	Joseph; W. Bailey (D)	Robert E. Burke (D)	Robert L. Henry (D)	S. W. T. Lanham (D)	Joseph D. Sayers (D)	Robert B. Hawley (R)	Rudolph; Kleberg (D)	James Luther; Slayden (D)	John H. Stephens (D)
56th (1899–1901)	Thomas; H. Ball (D)	Samuel B. Cooper (D)	Reese C. De Graffenreid (D)	John L. Sheppard (D)	Joseph; W. Bailey (D)	Robert E. Burke (D)	Robert L. Henry (D)	S. W. T. Lanham (D)	Albert S. Burleson (D)	Robert B. Hawley (R)	Rudolph; Kleberg (D)	James Luther; Slayden (D)	John H. Stephens (D)
57th (1901–1903)	Thomas; H. Ball (D)	Samuel B. Cooper (D)	Reese C. De Graffenreid (D)	John L. Sheppard (D)	Choice B. Randell (D)	Robert E. Burke (D)	Robert L. Henry (D)	S. W. T. Lanham (D)	Albert S. Burleson (D)	George F. Burgess (D)	Rudolph; Kleberg (D)	James Luther; Slayden (D)	John H. Stephens (D)
57th (1901–1903)	Thomas; H. Ball (D)	Samuel B. Cooper (D)	Gordon J. Russell (D)	Morris Sheppard (D)	Choice B. Randell (D)	Dudley Wooten (D)	Robert L. Henry (D)	S. W. T. Lanham (D)	Albert S. Burleson (D)	George F. Burgess (D)	Rudolph; Kleberg (D)	James Luther; Slayden (D)	John H. Stephens (D)

=== 1903 to 1913: 16 seats ===
After the 1900 United States census, Texas gained three seats.

Congress	District										District					
Congress	1st	2nd	3rd	4th	5th	6th	7th	8th	9th	10th	11th	12th	13th	14th	15th	16th
58th (1903–1905)	Morris; Sheppard (D)	Samuel B. Cooper (D)	Gordon J. Russell (D)	Choice; B. Randell (D)	Jack; Beall (D)	Scott; Field (D)	Alexander; W. Gregg (D)	Thomas H. Ball (D)	George; F. Burgess (D)	Albert S. Burleson (D)	Robert; L. Henry (D)	Oscar W. Gillespie (D)	John H. Stephens (D)	James; Luther; Slayden (D)	John; Nance; Garner (D)	William; Robert; Smith (D)
58th (1903–1905)	Morris; Sheppard (D)	Samuel B. Cooper (D)	Gordon J. Russell (D)	Choice; B. Randell (D)	Jack; Beall (D)	Scott; Field (D)	Alexander; W. Gregg (D)	John M. Pinckney (D)	George; F. Burgess (D)	Albert S. Burleson (D)	Robert; L. Henry (D)	Oscar W. Gillespie (D)	John H. Stephens (D)	James; Luther; Slayden (D)	John; Nance; Garner (D)	William; Robert; Smith (D)
59th (1905–1907)	Morris; Sheppard (D)	Moses L. Broocks (D)	Gordon J. Russell (D)	Choice; B. Randell (D)	Jack; Beall (D)	Scott; Field (D)	Alexander; W. Gregg (D)	John M. Moore (D)	George; F. Burgess (D)	Albert S. Burleson (D)	Robert; L. Henry (D)	Oscar W. Gillespie (D)	John H. Stephens (D)	James; Luther; Slayden (D)	John; Nance; Garner (D)	William; Robert; Smith (D)
60th (1907–1909)	Morris; Sheppard (D)	Samuel B. Cooper (D)	Gordon J. Russell (D)	Choice; B. Randell (D)	Jack; Beall (D)	Rufus; Hardy (D)	Alexander; W. Gregg (D)	John M. Moore (D)	George; F. Burgess (D)	Albert S. Burleson (D)	Robert; L. Henry (D)	Oscar W. Gillespie (D)	John H. Stephens (D)	James; Luther; Slayden (D)	John; Nance; Garner (D)	William; Robert; Smith (D)
61st (1909–1911)	Morris; Sheppard (D)	Martin; Dies Sr. (D)	Gordon J. Russell (D)	Choice; B. Randell (D)	Jack; Beall (D)	Rufus; Hardy (D)	Alexander; W. Gregg (D)	John M. Moore (D)	George; F. Burgess (D)	Albert S. Burleson (D)	Robert; L. Henry (D)	Oscar W. Gillespie (D)	John H. Stephens (D)	James; Luther; Slayden (D)	John; Nance; Garner (D)	William; Robert; Smith (D)
61st (1909–1911)	Morris; Sheppard (D)	Martin; Dies Sr. (D)	Robert M. Lively (D)	Choice; B. Randell (D)	Jack; Beall (D)	Rufus; Hardy (D)	Alexander; W. Gregg (D)	John M. Moore (D)	George; F. Burgess (D)	Albert S. Burleson (D)	Robert; L. Henry (D)	Oscar W. Gillespie (D)	John H. Stephens (D)	James; Luther; Slayden (D)	John; Nance; Garner (D)	William; Robert; Smith (D)
62nd (1911–1913)	Morris; Sheppard (D)	Martin; Dies Sr. (D)	James Young (D)	Choice; B. Randell (D)	Jack; Beall (D)	Rufus; Hardy (D)	Alexander; W. Gregg (D)	John M. Moore (D)	George; F. Burgess (D)	Albert S. Burleson (D)	Robert; L. Henry (D)	Oscar Callaway (D)	John H. Stephens (D)	James; Luther; Slayden (D)	John; Nance; Garner (D)	William; Robert; Smith (D)

=== 1913 to 1933: 18 seats ===
After the 1910 United States census, Texas gained two seats. At first, they were elected at-large, but starting in 1919 all were districted. There was not a reapportionment after the 1920 United States census.

Congress	District										District								Congress
Congress	1st	2nd	3rd	4th	5th	6th	7th	8th	9th	10th	11th	12th	13th	14th	15th	16th	At-large A	At-large B	Congress
63rd (1913–1915)	Horace W. Vaughan (D)	Martin; Dies Sr. (D)	James; Young (D)	Sam; Rayburn (D)	Jack; Beall (D)	Rufus; Hardy (D)	Alexander; W. Gregg (D)	Joe H. Eagle (D)	George; F. Burgess (D)	Buck; Buchanan (D)	Robert; L. Henry (D)	Oscar; Callaway (D)	John H. Stephens (D)	James; Luther; Slayden (D)	John; Nance; Garner (D)	William; Robert; Smith (D)	Daniel E. Garrett (D)	Hatton W. Sumners (D)	63rd (1913–1915)
64th (1915–1917)	Eugene; Black (D)	Martin; Dies Sr. (D)	James; Young (D)	Sam; Rayburn (D)	Hatton; W. Sumners (D)	Rufus; Hardy (D)	Alexander; W. Gregg (D)	Joe H. Eagle (D)	George; F. Burgess (D)	Buck; Buchanan (D)	Robert; L. Henry (D)	Oscar; Callaway (D)	John H. Stephens (D)	James; Luther; Slayden (D)	John; Nance; Garner (D)	William; Robert; Smith (D)	James H. Davis (D)	A. Jeff; McLemore (D)	64th (1915–1917)
65th (1917–1919)	Eugene; Black (D)	Martin; Dies Sr. (D)	James; Young (D)	Sam; Rayburn (D)	Hatton; W. Sumners (D)	Rufus; Hardy (D)	Alexander; W. Gregg (D)	Joe H. Eagle (D)	Joseph; J. Mansfield (D)	Buck; Buchanan (D)	Tom; Connally (D)	James C. Wilson (D)	Marvin; Jones (D)	James; Luther; Slayden (D)	John; Nance; Garner (D)	Thomas L. Blanton (D)	Daniel E. Garrett (D)	A. Jeff; McLemore (D)	65th (1917–1919)
66th (1919–1921)	Eugene; Black (D)	John C. Box (D)	James; Young (D)	Sam; Rayburn (D)	Hatton; W. Sumners (D)	Rufus; Hardy (D)	Clay; Stone; Briggs (D)	Joe H. Eagle (D)	Joseph; J. Mansfield (D)	Buck; Buchanan (D)	Tom; Connally (D)	Fritz G. Lanham (D)	Lucian W. Parrish (D)	Carlos; Bee (D)	John; Nance; Garner (D)	Claude; B. Hudspeth (D)	17th	18th	66th (1919–1921)
66th (1919–1921)	Eugene; Black (D)	John C. Box (D)	James; Young (D)	Sam; Rayburn (D)	Hatton; W. Sumners (D)	Rufus; Hardy (D)	Clay; Stone; Briggs (D)	Joe H. Eagle (D)	Joseph; J. Mansfield (D)	Buck; Buchanan (D)	Tom; Connally (D)	Fritz G. Lanham (D)	Lucian W. Parrish (D)	Carlos; Bee (D)	John; Nance; Garner (D)	Claude; B. Hudspeth (D)	Thomas L. Blanton (D)	Marvin; Jones (D)	66th (1919–1921)
67th (1921–1923)	Eugene; Black (D)	John C. Box (D)	Morgan; G. Sanders (D)	Sam; Rayburn (D)	Hatton; W. Sumners (D)	Rufus; Hardy (D)	Clay; Stone; Briggs (D)	Daniel; E. Garrett (D)	Joseph; J. Mansfield (D)	Buck; Buchanan (D)	Tom; Connally (D)	Fritz G. Lanham (D)	Lucian W. Parrish (D)	Harry M. Wurzbach (R)	John; Nance; Garner (D)	Claude; B. Hudspeth (D)	Thomas L. Blanton (D)	Marvin; Jones (D)	67th (1921–1923)
67th (1921–1923)	Eugene; Black (D)	John C. Box (D)	Morgan; G. Sanders (D)	Sam; Rayburn (D)	Hatton; W. Sumners (D)	Rufus; Hardy (D)	Clay; Stone; Briggs (D)	Daniel; E. Garrett (D)	Joseph; J. Mansfield (D)	Buck; Buchanan (D)	Tom; Connally (D)	Fritz G. Lanham (D)	Guinn; Williams (D)	Harry M. Wurzbach (R)	John; Nance; Garner (D)	Claude; B. Hudspeth (D)	Thomas L. Blanton (D)	Marvin; Jones (D)	67th (1921–1923)
68th (1923–1925)	Eugene; Black (D)	John C. Box (D)	Morgan; G. Sanders (D)	Sam; Rayburn (D)	Hatton; W. Sumners (D)	Luther; Johnson (D)	Clay; Stone; Briggs (D)	Daniel; E. Garrett (D)	Joseph; J. Mansfield (D)	Buck; Buchanan (D)	Tom; Connally (D)	Fritz G. Lanham (D)	Guinn; Williams (D)	Harry M. Wurzbach (R)	John; Nance; Garner (D)	Claude; B. Hudspeth (D)	Thomas L. Blanton (D)	Marvin; Jones (D)	68th (1923–1925)
69th (1925–1927)	Eugene; Black (D)	John C. Box (D)	Morgan; G. Sanders (D)	Sam; Rayburn (D)	Hatton; W. Sumners (D)	Luther; Johnson (D)	Clay; Stone; Briggs (D)	Daniel; E. Garrett (D)	Joseph; J. Mansfield (D)	Buck; Buchanan (D)	Tom; Connally (D)	Fritz G. Lanham (D)	Guinn; Williams (D)	Harry M. Wurzbach (R)	John; Nance; Garner (D)	Claude; B. Hudspeth (D)	Thomas L. Blanton (D)	Marvin; Jones (D)	69th (1925–1927)
70th (1927–1929)	Eugene; Black (D)	John C. Box (D)	Morgan; G. Sanders (D)	Sam; Rayburn (D)	Hatton; W. Sumners (D)	Luther; Johnson (D)	Clay; Stone; Briggs (D)	Daniel; E. Garrett (D)	Joseph; J. Mansfield (D)	Buck; Buchanan (D)	Tom; Connally (D)	Fritz G. Lanham (D)	Guinn; Williams (D)	Harry M. Wurzbach (R)	John; Nance; Garner (D)	Claude; B. Hudspeth (D)	Thomas L. Blanton (D)	Marvin; Jones (D)	70th (1927–1929)
71st (1929–1931)	Wright; Patman (D)	John C. Box (D)	Morgan; G. Sanders (D)	Sam; Rayburn (D)	Hatton; W. Sumners (D)	Luther; Johnson (D)	Clay; Stone; Briggs (D)	Daniel; E. Garrett (D)	Joseph; J. Mansfield (D)	Buck; Buchanan (D)	Oliver; H. Cross (D)	Fritz G. Lanham (D)	Guinn; Williams (D)	Augustus; McCloskey (D)	John; Nance; Garner (D)	Claude; B. Hudspeth (D)	Robert Q. Lee (D)	Marvin; Jones (D)	71st (1929–1931)
71st (1929–1931)	Wright; Patman (D)	John C. Box (D)	Morgan; G. Sanders (D)	Sam; Rayburn (D)	Hatton; W. Sumners (D)	Luther; Johnson (D)	Clay; Stone; Briggs (D)	Daniel; E. Garrett (D)	Joseph; J. Mansfield (D)	Buck; Buchanan (D)	Oliver; H. Cross (D)	Fritz G. Lanham (D)	Guinn; Williams (D)	Harry M. Wurzbach (R)	John; Nance; Garner (D)	Claude; B. Hudspeth (D)	Thomas L. Blanton (D)	Marvin; Jones (D)	71st (1929–1931)
72nd (1931–1933)	Wright; Patman (D)	Martin; Dies Jr. (D)	Morgan; G. Sanders (D)	Sam; Rayburn (D)	Hatton; W. Sumners (D)	Luther; Johnson (D)	Clay; Stone; Briggs (D)	Daniel; E. Garrett (D)	Joseph; J. Mansfield (D)	Buck; Buchanan (D)	Oliver; H. Cross (D)	Fritz G. Lanham (D)	Guinn; Williams (D)	Harry M. Wurzbach (R)	John; Nance; Garner (D)	R. Ewing; Thomason (D)	Thomas L. Blanton (D)	Marvin; Jones (D)	72nd (1931–1933)
72nd (1931–1933)	Wright; Patman (D)	Martin; Dies Jr. (D)	Morgan; G. Sanders (D)	Sam; Rayburn (D)	Hatton; W. Sumners (D)	Luther; Johnson (D)	Clay; Stone; Briggs (D)	Joe H. Eagle (D)	Joseph; J. Mansfield (D)	Buck; Buchanan (D)	Oliver; H. Cross (D)	Fritz G. Lanham (D)	Guinn; Williams (D)	Richard M. Kleberg (D)	John; Nance; Garner (D)	R. Ewing; Thomason (D)	Thomas L. Blanton (D)	Marvin; Jones (D)	72nd (1931–1933)

=== 1933 to 1953: 21 seats ===
After the 1930 United States census, Texas gained three seats. At first, they were elected at-large, but starting in 1935 all were districted. There was no reapportionment after the 1940 United States census.

Congress
73rd
(1933–1935)
74th
(1935–1937)
75th
(1937–1939)
76th
(1939–1941)
77th
(1941–1943)
78th
(1943–1945)
79th
(1945–1947)
80th
(1947–1949)
81st
(1949–1951)
82nd
(1951–1953)

District										District											Congress
1st	2nd	3rd	4th	5th	6th	7th	8th	9th	10th	11th	12th	13th	14th	15th	16th	17th	18th	At-large A	At-large B	At-large C	Congress
Wright; Patman (D)	Martin; Dies Jr. (D)	Morgan; G. Sanders (D)	Sam; Rayburn (D)	Hatton; W. Sumners (D)	Luther; Johnson (D)	Clark W. Thompson (D)	Joe H. Eagle (D)	Joseph; J. Mansfield (D)	Buck; Buchanan (D)	Oliver; H. Cross (D)	Fritz; G. Lanham (D)	William; D. McFarlane (D)	Richard; M. Kleberg (D)	Milton; H. West (D)	R. Ewing; Thomason (D)	Thomas; L. Blanton (D)	Marvin; Jones (D)	Joseph W. Bailey Jr. (D)	Sterling P. Strong (D)	George B. Terrell (D)	73rd (1933–1935)
Wright; Patman (D)	Martin; Dies Jr. (D)	Morgan; G. Sanders (D)	Sam; Rayburn (D)	Hatton; W. Sumners (D)	Luther; Johnson (D)	Ned; Patton (D)	Joe H. Eagle (D)	Joseph; J. Mansfield (D)	Buck; Buchanan (D)	Oliver; H. Cross (D)	Fritz; G. Lanham (D)	William; D. McFarlane (D)	Richard; M. Kleberg (D)	Milton; H. West (D)	R. Ewing; Thomason (D)	Thomas; L. Blanton (D)	Marvin; Jones (D)	19th	20th	21st	74th (1935–1937)
Wright; Patman (D)	Martin; Dies Jr. (D)	Morgan; G. Sanders (D)	Sam; Rayburn (D)	Hatton; W. Sumners (D)	Luther; Johnson (D)	Ned; Patton (D)	Joe H. Eagle (D)	Joseph; J. Mansfield (D)	Buck; Buchanan (D)	Oliver; H. Cross (D)	Fritz; G. Lanham (D)	William; D. McFarlane (D)	Richard; M. Kleberg (D)	Milton; H. West (D)	R. Ewing; Thomason (D)	Thomas; L. Blanton (D)	Marvin; Jones (D)	George H. Mahon (D)	Maury; Maverick (D)	Charles L. South (D)	74th (1935–1937)
Wright; Patman (D)	Martin; Dies Jr. (D)	Morgan; G. Sanders (D)	Sam; Rayburn (D)	Hatton; W. Sumners (D)	Luther; Johnson (D)	Ned; Patton (D)	Albert; Thomas (D)	Joseph; J. Mansfield (D)	Buck; Buchanan (D)	William; R. Poage (D)	Fritz; G. Lanham (D)	William; D. McFarlane (D)	Richard; M. Kleberg (D)	Milton; H. West (D)	R. Ewing; Thomason (D)	Clyde; L. Garrett (D)	Marvin; Jones (D)	George H. Mahon (D)	Maury; Maverick (D)	Charles L. South (D)	75th (1937–1939)
Wright; Patman (D)	Martin; Dies Jr. (D)	Lindley; Beckworth (D)	Sam; Rayburn (D)	Hatton; W. Sumners (D)	Luther; Johnson (D)	Ned; Patton (D)	Albert; Thomas (D)	Joseph; J. Mansfield (D)	Lyndon; B. Johnson (D)	William; R. Poage (D)	Fritz; G. Lanham (D)	Ed; Gossett (D)	Richard; M. Kleberg (D)	Milton; H. West (D)	R. Ewing; Thomason (D)	Clyde; L. Garrett (D)	Marvin; Jones (D)	George H. Mahon (D)	Paul J. Kilday (D)	Charles L. South (D)	76th (1939–1941)
Wright; Patman (D)	Martin; Dies Jr. (D)	Lindley; Beckworth (D)	Sam; Rayburn (D)	Hatton; W. Sumners (D)	Luther; Johnson (D)	Ned; Patton (D)	Albert; Thomas (D)	Joseph; J. Mansfield (D)	Lyndon; B. Johnson (D)	William; R. Poage (D)	Fritz; G. Lanham (D)	Ed; Gossett (D)	Richard; M. Kleberg (D)	Milton; H. West (D)	R. Ewing; Thomason (D)	Sam; M. Russell (D)	Eugene; Worley (D)	George H. Mahon (D)	Paul J. Kilday (D)	Charles L. South (D)	77th (1941–1943)
Wright; Patman (D)	Martin; Dies Jr. (D)	Lindley; Beckworth (D)	Sam; Rayburn (D)	Hatton; W. Sumners (D)	Luther; Johnson (D)	Ned; Patton (D)	Albert; Thomas (D)	Joseph; J. Mansfield (D)	Lyndon; B. Johnson (D)	William; R. Poage (D)	Fritz; G. Lanham (D)	Ed; Gossett (D)	Richard; M. Kleberg (D)	Milton; H. West (D)	R. Ewing; Thomason (D)	Sam; M. Russell (D)	Eugene; Worley (D)	George H. Mahon (D)	Paul J. Kilday (D)	O. C. Fisher (D)	78th (1943–1945)
Wright; Patman (D)	Jesse; M. Combs (D)	Lindley; Beckworth (D)	Sam; Rayburn (D)	Hatton; W. Sumners (D)	Luther; Johnson (D)	Tom; Pickett (D)	Albert; Thomas (D)	Joseph; J. Mansfield (D)	Lyndon; B. Johnson (D)	William; R. Poage (D)	Fritz; G. Lanham (D)	Ed; Gossett (D)	John E. Lyle; Jr. (D)	Milton; H. West (D)	R. Ewing; Thomason (D)	Sam; M. Russell (D)	Eugene; Worley (D)	George H. Mahon (D)	Paul J. Kilday (D)	O. C. Fisher (D)	79th (1945–1947)
Wright; Patman (D)	Jesse; M. Combs (D)	Lindley; Beckworth (D)	Sam; Rayburn (D)	Joseph; Franklin; Wilson (D)	Olin; E. Teague (D)	Tom; Pickett (D)	Albert; Thomas (D)	Joseph; J. Mansfield (D)	Lyndon; B. Johnson (D)	William; R. Poage (D)	Wingate; H. Lucas (D)	Ed; Gossett (D)	John E. Lyle; Jr. (D)	Milton; H. West (D)	R. Ewing; Thomason (D)	Omar; Burleson (D)	Eugene; Worley (D)	George H. Mahon (D)	Paul J. Kilday (D)	O. C. Fisher (D)	80th (1947–1949)
Wright; Patman (D)	Jesse; M. Combs (D)	Lindley; Beckworth (D)	Sam; Rayburn (D)	Joseph; Franklin; Wilson (D)	Olin; E. Teague (D)	Tom; Pickett (D)	Albert; Thomas (D)	Clark W. Thompson (D)	Homer; Thornberry (D)	William; R. Poage (D)	Wingate; H. Lucas (D)	Ed; Gossett (D)	John E. Lyle; Jr. (D)	Lloyd; Bentsen (D)	Kenneth; M. Regan (D)	Omar; Burleson (D)	Ben H. Guill (R)	George H. Mahon (D)	Paul J. Kilday (D)	O. C. Fisher (D)	81st (1949–1951)
Wright; Patman (D)	Jesse; M. Combs (D)	Lindley; Beckworth (D)	Sam; Rayburn (D)	Joseph; Franklin; Wilson (D)	Olin; E. Teague (D)	Tom; Pickett (D)	Albert; Thomas (D)	Clark W. Thompson (D)	Homer; Thornberry (D)	William; R. Poage (D)	Wingate; H. Lucas (D)	Frank N. Ikard (D)	John E. Lyle; Jr. (D)	Lloyd; Bentsen (D)	Kenneth; M. Regan (D)	Omar; Burleson (D)	Walter E. Rogers (D)	George H. Mahon (D)	Paul J. Kilday (D)	O. C. Fisher (D)	82nd (1951–1953)

=== 1953 to 1963: 22 seats ===
After the 1950 United States census, Texas gained one seat. At first, it was elected at-large, but starting in 1959 all were districted.

Congress	District										District												Congress
Congress	1st	2nd	3rd	4th	5th	6th	7th	8th	9th	10th	11th	12th	13th	14th	15th	16th	17th	18th	19th	20th	21st	At-large	Congress
83rd (1953–1955)	Wright Patman (D)	Jack Brooks (D)	Brady P. Gentry (D)	Sam Rayburn (D)	Joseph Franklin Wilson (D)	Olin E. Teague (D)	John Dowdy (D)	Albert Thomas (D)	Clark W. Thompson (D)	Homer Thornberry (D)	William R. Poage (D)	Wingate H. Lucas (D)	Frank N. Ikard (D)	John E. Lyle Jr. (D)	Lloyd Bentsen (D)	Kenneth M. Regan (D)	Omar Burleson (D)	Walter E. Rogers (D)	George H. Mahon (D)	Paul J. Kilday (D)	O. C. Fisher (D)	Martin Dies Jr. (D)	83rd (1953–1955)
84th (1955–1957)	Wright Patman (D)	Jack Brooks (D)	Brady P. Gentry (D)	Sam Rayburn (D)	Bruce Alger (R)	Olin E. Teague (D)	John Dowdy (D)	Albert Thomas (D)	Clark W. Thompson (D)	Homer Thornberry (D)	William R. Poage (D)	Jim Wright (D)	Frank N. Ikard (D)	John J. Bell (D)	Joe M. Kilgore (D)	J. T. Rutherford (D)	Omar Burleson (D)	Walter E. Rogers (D)	George H. Mahon (D)	Paul J. Kilday (D)	O. C. Fisher (D)	Martin Dies Jr. (D)	84th (1955–1957)
85th (1957–1959)	Wright Patman (D)	Jack Brooks (D)	Lindley Beckworth (D)	Sam Rayburn (D)	Bruce Alger (R)	Olin E. Teague (D)	John Dowdy (D)	Albert Thomas (D)	Clark W. Thompson (D)	Homer Thornberry (D)	William R. Poage (D)	Jim Wright (D)	Frank N. Ikard (D)	John Young (D)	Joe M. Kilgore (D)	J. T. Rutherford (D)	Omar Burleson (D)	Walter E. Rogers (D)	George H. Mahon (D)	Paul J. Kilday (D)	O. C. Fisher (D)	Martin Dies Jr. (D)	85th (1957–1959)
86th (1959–1961)	Wright Patman (D)	Jack Brooks (D)	Lindley Beckworth (D)	Sam Rayburn (D)	Bruce Alger (R)	Olin E. Teague (D)	John Dowdy (D)	Albert Thomas (D)	Clark W. Thompson (D)	Homer Thornberry (D)	William R. Poage (D)	Jim Wright (D)	Frank N. Ikard (D)	John Young (D)	Joe M. Kilgore (D)	J. T. Rutherford (D)	Omar Burleson (D)	Walter E. Rogers (D)	George H. Mahon (D)	Paul J. Kilday (D)	O. C. Fisher (D)	22nd	86th (1959–1961)
86th (1959–1961)	Wright Patman (D)	Jack Brooks (D)	Lindley Beckworth (D)	Sam Rayburn (D)	Bruce Alger (R)	Olin E. Teague (D)	John Dowdy (D)	Albert Thomas (D)	Clark W. Thompson (D)	Homer Thornberry (D)	William R. Poage (D)	Jim Wright (D)	Frank N. Ikard (D)	John Young (D)	Joe M. Kilgore (D)	J. T. Rutherford (D)	Omar Burleson (D)	Walter E. Rogers (D)	George H. Mahon (D)	Paul J. Kilday (D)	O. C. Fisher (D)	Robert R. Casey (D)	86th (1959–1961)
87th (1961–1963)	Wright Patman (D)	Jack Brooks (D)	Lindley Beckworth (D)	Sam Rayburn (D)	Bruce Alger (R)	Olin E. Teague (D)	John Dowdy (D)	Albert Thomas (D)	Clark W. Thompson (D)	Homer Thornberry (D)	William R. Poage (D)	Jim Wright (D)	Frank N. Ikard (D)	John Young (D)	Joe M. Kilgore (D)	J. T. Rutherford (D)	Omar Burleson (D)	Walter E. Rogers (D)	George H. Mahon (D)	Paul J. Kilday (D)	O. C. Fisher (D)	Robert R. Casey (D)	87th (1961–1963)

=== 1963 to 1973: 23 seats ===
After the 1960 United States census, Texas gained one seat. At first, it was elected at-large, but starting in 1967 all were districted.

Congress	District											District												Congress
Congress	1st	2nd	3rd	4th	5th	6th	7th	8th	9th	10th	11th	12th	13th	14th	15th	16th	17th	18th	19th	20th	21st	22nd	At-large	Congress
88th (1963–1965)	Wright Patman (D)	Jack Brooks (D)	Lindley Beckworth (D)	Ray Roberts (D)	Bruce Alger (R)	Olin E. Teague (D)	John Dowdy (D)	Albert Thomas (D)	Clark W. Thompson (D)	Homer Thornberry (D)	William R. Poage (D)	Jim Wright (D)	Graham B. Purcell Jr. (D)	John Young (D)	Joe M. Kilgore (D)	Ed Foreman (R)	Omar Burleson (D)	Walter E. Rogers (D)	George H. Mahon (D)	Henry B. González (D)	O. C. Fisher (D)	Robert R. Casey (D)	Joe R. Pool (D)	88th (1963–1965)
89th (1965–1967)	Wright Patman (D)	Jack Brooks (D)	Lindley Beckworth (D)	Ray Roberts (D)	Earle Cabell (D)	Olin E. Teague (D)	John Dowdy (D)	Lera M. Thomas (D)	Clark W. Thompson (D)	J. J. Pickle (D)	William R. Poage (D)	Jim Wright (D)	Graham B. Purcell Jr. (D)	John Young (D)	Kika de la Garza (D)	Richard C. White (D)	Omar Burleson (D)	Walter E. Rogers (D)	George H. Mahon (D)	Henry B. González (D)	O. C. Fisher (D)	Robert R. Casey (D)	Joe R. Pool (D)	89th (1965–1967)
90th (1967–1969)	Wright Patman (D)	John Dowdy (D)	Joe R. Pool (D)	Ray Roberts (D)	Earle Cabell (D)	Olin E. Teague (D)	George H. W. Bush (R)	Bob Eckhardt (D)	Jack Brooks (D)	J. J. Pickle (D)	William R. Poage (D)	Jim Wright (D)	Graham B. Purcell Jr. (D)	John Young (D)	Kika de la Garza (D)	Richard C. White (D)	Omar Burleson (D)	Bob Price (R)	George H. Mahon (D)	Henry B. González (D)	O. C. Fisher (D)	Robert R. Casey (D)	23rd	90th (1967–1969)
90th (1967–1969)	Wright Patman (D)	John Dowdy (D)	Joe R. Pool (D)	Ray Roberts (D)	Earle Cabell (D)	Olin E. Teague (D)	George H. W. Bush (R)	Bob Eckhardt (D)	Jack Brooks (D)	J. J. Pickle (D)	William R. Poage (D)	Jim Wright (D)	Graham B. Purcell Jr. (D)	John Young (D)	Kika de la Garza (D)	Richard C. White (D)	Omar Burleson (D)	Bob Price (R)	George H. Mahon (D)	Henry B. González (D)	O. C. Fisher (D)	Robert R. Casey (D)	Chick Kazen (D)	90th (1967–1969)
90th (1967–1969)	Wright Patman (D)	John Dowdy (D)	Jim Collins (R)	Ray Roberts (D)	Earle Cabell (D)	Olin E. Teague (D)	George H. W. Bush (R)	Bob Eckhardt (D)	Jack Brooks (D)	J. J. Pickle (D)	William R. Poage (D)	Jim Wright (D)	Graham B. Purcell Jr. (D)	John Young (D)	Kika de la Garza (D)	Richard C. White (D)	Omar Burleson (D)	Bob Price (R)	George H. Mahon (D)	Henry B. González (D)	O. C. Fisher (D)	Robert R. Casey (D)	Chick Kazen (D)	90th (1967–1969)
91st (1969–1971)	Wright Patman (D)	John Dowdy (D)	Jim Collins (R)	Ray Roberts (D)	Earle Cabell (D)	Olin E. Teague (D)	George H. W. Bush (R)	Bob Eckhardt (D)	Jack Brooks (D)	J. J. Pickle (D)	William R. Poage (D)	Jim Wright (D)	Graham B. Purcell Jr. (D)	John Young (D)	Kika de la Garza (D)	Richard C. White (D)	Omar Burleson (D)	Bob Price (R)	George H. Mahon (D)	Henry B. González (D)	O. C. Fisher (D)	Robert R. Casey (D)	Chick Kazen (D)	91st (1969–1971)
92nd (1971–1973)	Wright Patman (D)	John Dowdy (D)	Jim Collins (R)	Ray Roberts (D)	Earle Cabell (D)	Olin E. Teague (D)	Bill Archer (R)	Bob Eckhardt (D)	Jack Brooks (D)	J. J. Pickle (D)	William R. Poage (D)	Jim Wright (D)	Graham B. Purcell Jr. (D)	John Young (D)	Kika de la Garza (D)	Richard C. White (D)	Omar Burleson (D)	Bob Price (R)	George H. Mahon (D)	Henry B. González (D)	O. C. Fisher (D)	Robert R. Casey (D)	Chick Kazen (D)	92nd (1971–1973)

=== 1973 to 1983: 24 seats ===
After the 1970 United States census, Texas gained one seat.

Congress	District												District												Congress
Congress	1st	2nd	3rd	4th	5th	6th	7th	8th	9th	10th	11th	12th	13th	14th	15th	16th	17th	18th	19th	20th	21st	22nd	23rd	24th	Congress
93rd (1973–1975)	Wright Patman (D)	Charlie Wilson (D)	Jim Collins (R)	Ray Roberts (D)	Alan Steelman (R)	Olin E. Teague (D)	Bill Archer (R)	Bob Eckhardt (D)	Jack Brooks (D)	J. J. Pickle (D)	William R. Poage (D)	Jim Wright (D)	Bob Price (R)	John Young (D)	Kika de la Garza (D)	Richard Crawford White (D)	Omar Burleson (D)	Barbara Jordan (D)	George H. Mahon (D)	Henry B. González (D)	O. C. Fisher (D)	Robert R. Casey (D)	Chick Kazen (D)	Dale Milford (D)	93rd (1973–1975)
94th (1975–1977)	Wright Patman (D)	Charlie Wilson (D)	Jim Collins (R)	Ray Roberts (D)	Alan Steelman (R)	Olin E. Teague (D)	Bill Archer (R)	Bob Eckhardt (D)	Jack Brooks (D)	J. J. Pickle (D)	William R. Poage (D)	Jim Wright (D)	Jack Hightower (D)	John Young (D)	Kika de la Garza (D)	Richard Crawford White (D)	Omar Burleson (D)	Barbara Jordan (D)	George H. Mahon (D)	Henry B. González (D)	Bob Krueger (D)	Robert R. Casey (D)	Chick Kazen (D)	Dale Milford (D)	94th (1975–1977)
94th (1975–1977)	Sam B. Hall Jr. (D)	Charlie Wilson (D)	Jim Collins (R)	Ray Roberts (D)	Alan Steelman (R)	Olin E. Teague (D)	Bill Archer (R)	Bob Eckhardt (D)	Jack Brooks (D)	J. J. Pickle (D)	William R. Poage (D)	Jim Wright (D)	Jack Hightower (D)	John Young (D)	Kika de la Garza (D)	Richard Crawford White (D)	Omar Burleson (D)	Barbara Jordan (D)	George H. Mahon (D)	Henry B. González (D)	Bob Krueger (D)	Robert R. Casey (D)	Chick Kazen (D)	Dale Milford (D)	94th (1975–1977)
95th (1977–1979)	Sam B. Hall Jr. (D)	Charlie Wilson (D)	Jim Collins (R)	Ray Roberts (D)	Jim Mattox (D)	Olin E. Teague (D)	Bill Archer (R)	Bob Eckhardt (D)	Jack Brooks (D)	J. J. Pickle (D)	William R. Poage (D)	Jim Wright (D)	Jack Hightower (D)	John Young (D)	Kika de la Garza (D)	Richard Crawford White (D)	Omar Burleson (D)	Barbara Jordan (D)	George H. Mahon (D)	Henry B. González (D)	Bob Krueger (D)	Bob Gammage (D)	Chick Kazen (D)	Dale Milford (D)	95th (1977–1979)
96th (1979–1981)	Sam B. Hall Jr. (D)	Charlie Wilson (D)	Jim Collins (R)	Ray Roberts (D)	Jim Mattox (D)	Phil Gramm (D)	Bill Archer (R)	Bob Eckhardt (D)	Jack Brooks (D)	J. J. Pickle (D)	Marvin Leath (D)	Jim Wright (D)	Jack Hightower (D)	Joseph Wyatt (D)	Kika de la Garza (D)	Richard Crawford White (D)	Charles Stenholm (D)	Mickey Leland (D)	Kent Hance (D)	Henry B. González (D)	Tom Loeffler (R)	Ron Paul (R)	Chick Kazen (D)	Martin Frost (D)	96th (1979–1981)
97th (1981–1983)	Sam B. Hall Jr. (D)	Charlie Wilson (D)	Jim Collins (R)	Ralph Hall (D)	Jim Mattox (D)	Phil Gramm (D)	Bill Archer (R)	Jack Fields (R)	Jack Brooks (D)	J. J. Pickle (D)	Marvin Leath (D)	Jim Wright (D)	Jack Hightower (D)	Bill Patman (D)	Kika de la Garza (D)	Richard Crawford White (D)	Charles Stenholm (D)	Mickey Leland (D)	Kent Hance (D)	Henry B. González (D)	Tom Loeffler (R)	Ron Paul (R)	Chick Kazen (D)	Martin Frost (D)	97th (1981–1983)

=== 1983 to 1993: 27 seats ===
After the 1980 United States census, Texas gained three seats.

Congress
98th
(1983–1985)
99th
(1985–1987)
100th
(1987–1989)
101st
(1989–1991)
102nd
(1991–1993)

District										District										District							Congress
1st	2nd	3rd	4th	5th	6th	7th	8th	9th	10th	11th	12th	13th	14th	15th	16th	17th	18th	19th	20th	21st	22nd	23rd	24th	25th	26th	27th	Congress
Sam B. Hall Jr. (D)	Charlie; Wilson (D)	Steve; Bartlett (R)	Ralph; Hall (D)	John; Bryant (D)	Phil; Gramm (R)	Bill; Archer (R)	Jack; Fields (R)	Jack; Brooks (D)	J. J. Pickle (D)	Marvin; Leath (D)	Jim; Wright (D)	Jack High- tower (D)	Bill; Patman (D)	Kika de la Garza (D)	Ron; Coleman (D)	Charles; Stenholm (D)	Mickey; Leland (D)	Kent; Hance (D)	Henry B. González (D)	Tom; Loeffler (R)	Ron; Paul (R)	Chick; Kazen (D)	Martin; Frost (D)	Michael; A. Andrews (D)	Tom Vander- griff (D)	Solomon; Ortiz (D)	98th (1983–1985)
Sam B. Hall Jr. (D)	Charlie; Wilson (D)	Steve; Bartlett (R)	Ralph; Hall (D)	John; Bryant (D)	Joe; Barton (R)	Bill; Archer (R)	Jack; Fields (R)	Jack; Brooks (D)	J. J. Pickle (D)	Marvin; Leath (D)	Jim; Wright (D)	Beau; Boulter (R)	Mac; Sweeney (R)	Kika de la Garza (D)	Ron; Coleman (D)	Charles; Stenholm (D)	Mickey; Leland (D)	Larry; Combest (R)	Henry B. González (D)	Tom; Loeffler (R)	Tom; DeLay (R)	Albert; Bustamante (D)	Martin; Frost (D)	Michael; A. Andrews (D)	Dick; Armey (R)	Solomon; Ortiz (D)	99th (1985–1987)
Jim; Chapman (D)	Charlie; Wilson (D)	Steve; Bartlett (R)	Ralph; Hall (D)	John; Bryant (D)	Joe; Barton (R)	Bill; Archer (R)	Jack; Fields (R)	Jack; Brooks (D)	J. J. Pickle (D)	Marvin; Leath (D)	Jim; Wright (D)	Beau; Boulter (R)	Mac; Sweeney (R)	Kika de la Garza (D)	Ron; Coleman (D)	Charles; Stenholm (D)	Mickey; Leland (D)	Larry; Combest (R)	Henry B. González (D)	Tom; Loeffler (R)	Tom; DeLay (R)	Albert; Bustamante (D)	Martin; Frost (D)	Michael; A. Andrews (D)	Dick; Armey (R)	Solomon; Ortiz (D)	99th (1985–1987)
Jim; Chapman (D)	Charlie; Wilson (D)	Steve; Bartlett (R)	Ralph; Hall (D)	John; Bryant (D)	Joe; Barton (R)	Bill; Archer (R)	Jack; Fields (R)	Jack; Brooks (D)	J. J. Pickle (D)	Marvin; Leath (D)	Jim; Wright (D)	Beau; Boulter (R)	Mac; Sweeney (R)	Kika de la Garza (D)	Ron; Coleman (D)	Charles; Stenholm (D)	Mickey; Leland (D)	Larry; Combest (R)	Henry B. González (D)	Lamar; Smith (R)	Tom; DeLay (R)	Albert; Bustamante (D)	Martin; Frost (D)	Michael; A. Andrews (D)	Dick; Armey (R)	Solomon; Ortiz (D)	100th (1987–1989)
Jim; Chapman (D)	Charlie; Wilson (D)	Steve; Bartlett (R)	Ralph; Hall (D)	John; Bryant (D)	Joe; Barton (R)	Bill; Archer (R)	Jack; Fields (R)	Jack; Brooks (D)	J. J. Pickle (D)	Marvin; Leath (D)	Jim; Wright (D)	Bill; Sarpalius (D)	Greg; Laughlin (D)	Kika de la Garza (D)	Ron; Coleman (D)	Charles; Stenholm (D)	Mickey; Leland (D)	Larry; Combest (R)	Henry B. González (D)	Lamar; Smith (R)	Tom; DeLay (R)	Albert; Bustamante (D)	Martin; Frost (D)	Michael; A. Andrews (D)	Dick; Armey (R)	Solomon; Ortiz (D)	101st (1989–1991)
Jim; Chapman (D)	Charlie; Wilson (D)	Steve; Bartlett (R)	Ralph; Hall (D)	John; Bryant (D)	Joe; Barton (R)	Bill; Archer (R)	Jack; Fields (R)	Jack; Brooks (D)	J. J. Pickle (D)	Marvin; Leath (D)	Pete; Geren (D)	Bill; Sarpalius (D)	Greg; Laughlin (D)	Kika de la Garza (D)	Ron; Coleman (D)	Charles; Stenholm (D)	Craig; Washington (D)	Larry; Combest (R)	Henry B. González (D)	Lamar; Smith (R)	Tom; DeLay (R)	Albert; Bustamante (D)	Martin; Frost (D)	Michael; A. Andrews (D)	Dick; Armey (R)	Solomon; Ortiz (D)	101st (1989–1991)
Jim; Chapman (D)	Charlie; Wilson (D)	Steve; Bartlett (R)	Ralph; Hall (D)	John; Bryant (D)	Joe; Barton (R)	Bill; Archer (R)	Jack; Fields (R)	Jack; Brooks (D)	J. J. Pickle (D)	Chet; Edwards (D)	Pete; Geren (D)	Bill; Sarpalius (D)	Greg; Laughlin (D)	Kika de la Garza (D)	Ron; Coleman (D)	Charles; Stenholm (D)	Craig; Washington (D)	Larry; Combest (R)	Henry B. González (D)	Lamar; Smith (R)	Tom; DeLay (R)	Albert; Bustamante (D)	Martin; Frost (D)	Michael; A. Andrews (D)	Dick; Armey (R)	Solomon; Ortiz (D)	102nd (1991–1993)
Jim; Chapman (D)	Charlie; Wilson (D)	Sam; Johnson (R)	Ralph; Hall (D)	John; Bryant (D)	Joe; Barton (R)	Bill; Archer (R)	Jack; Fields (R)	Jack; Brooks (D)	J. J. Pickle (D)	Chet; Edwards (D)	Pete; Geren (D)	Bill; Sarpalius (D)	Greg; Laughlin (D)	Kika de la Garza (D)	Ron; Coleman (D)	Charles; Stenholm (D)	Craig; Washington (D)	Larry; Combest (R)	Henry B. González (D)	Lamar; Smith (R)	Tom; DeLay (R)	Albert; Bustamante (D)	Martin; Frost (D)	Michael; A. Andrews (D)	Dick; Armey (R)	Solomon; Ortiz (D)	102nd (1991–1993)

=== 1993 to 2003: 30 seats ===
After the 1990 United States census, Texas gained three seats.

Congress
103rd
(1993–1995)
104th
(1995–1997)
105th
(1997–1999)
106th
(1999–2001)
107th
(2001–2003)

District										District										District										Congress
1st	2nd	3rd	4th	5th	6th	7th	8th	9th	10th	11th	12th	13th	14th	15th	16th	17th	18th	19th	20th	21st	22nd	23rd	24th	25th	26th	27th	28th	29th	30th	Congress
Jim; Chapman (D)	Charlie; Wilson (D)	Sam; Johnson (R)	Ralph; Hall (D)	John; Bryant (D)	Joe; Barton (R)	Bill; Archer (R)	Jack; Fields (R)	Jack; Brooks (D)	J. J. Pickle (D)	Chet; Edwards (D)	Pete; Geren (D)	Bill Sar- palius (D)	Greg; Laughlin (D)	Kika de la Garza (D)	Ron; Coleman (D)	Charles; Stenholm (D)	Craig Wash- ington (D)	Larry; Combest (R)	Henry B. González (D)	Lamar; Smith (R)	Tom; DeLay (R)	Henry; Bonilla (R)	Martin; Frost (D)	Michael A. Andrews (D)	Dick; Armey (R)	Solomon; Ortiz (D)	Frank; Tejeda (D)	Gene; Green (D)	Eddie; Bernice; Johnson (D)	103rd (1993–1995)
Jim; Chapman (D)	Charlie; Wilson (D)	Sam; Johnson (R)	Ralph; Hall (D)	John; Bryant (D)	Joe; Barton (R)	Bill; Archer (R)	Jack; Fields (R)	Steve; Stockman (R)	Lloyd; Doggett (D)	Chet; Edwards (D)	Pete; Geren (D)	Mac; Thornberry (R)	Greg; Laughlin (R)	Kika de la Garza (D)	Ron; Coleman (D)	Charles; Stenholm (D)	Sheila; Jackson; Lee (D)	Larry; Combest (R)	Henry B. González (D)	Lamar; Smith (R)	Tom; DeLay (R)	Henry; Bonilla (R)	Martin; Frost (D)	Ken; Bentsen (D)	Dick; Armey (R)	Solomon; Ortiz (D)	Frank; Tejeda (D)	Gene; Green (D)	Eddie; Bernice; Johnson (D)	104th (1995–1997)
Max; Sandlin (D)	Jim; Turner (D)	Sam; Johnson (R)	Ralph; Hall (D)	Pete; Sessions (R)	Joe; Barton (R)	Bill; Archer (R)	Kevin; Brady (R)	Nick; Lampson (D)	Lloyd; Doggett (D)	Chet; Edwards (D)	Kay; Granger (R)	Mac; Thornberry (R)	Ron; Paul (R)	Rubén; Hinojosa (D)	Silver; Reyes (D)	Charles; Stenholm (D)	Sheila; Jackson; Lee (D)	Larry; Combest (R)	Henry B. González (D)	Lamar; Smith (R)	Tom; DeLay (R)	Henry; Bonilla (R)	Martin; Frost (D)	Ken; Bentsen (D)	Dick; Armey (R)	Solomon; Ortiz (D)	Frank; Tejeda (D)	Gene; Green (D)	Eddie; Bernice; Johnson (D)	105th (1997–1999)
Max; Sandlin (D)	Jim; Turner (D)	Sam; Johnson (R)	Ralph; Hall (D)	Pete; Sessions (R)	Joe; Barton (R)	Bill; Archer (R)	Kevin; Brady (R)	Nick; Lampson (D)	Lloyd; Doggett (D)	Chet; Edwards (D)	Kay; Granger (R)	Mac; Thornberry (R)	Ron; Paul (R)	Rubén; Hinojosa (D)	Silver; Reyes (D)	Charles; Stenholm (D)	Sheila; Jackson; Lee (D)	Larry; Combest (R)	Charlie; Gonzalez (D)	Lamar; Smith (R)	Tom; DeLay (R)	Henry; Bonilla (R)	Martin; Frost (D)	Ken; Bentsen (D)	Dick; Armey (R)	Solomon; Ortiz (D)	Ciro; Rodriguez (D)	Gene; Green (D)	Eddie; Bernice; Johnson (D)	106th (1999–2001)
Max; Sandlin (D)	Jim; Turner (D)	Sam; Johnson (R)	Ralph; Hall (D)	Pete; Sessions (R)	Joe; Barton (R)	John Cul- berson (R)	Kevin; Brady (R)	Nick; Lampson (D)	Lloyd; Doggett (D)	Chet; Edwards (D)	Kay; Granger (R)	Mac; Thornberry (R)	Ron; Paul (R)	Rubén; Hinojosa (D)	Silver; Reyes (D)	Charles; Stenholm (D)	Sheila; Jackson; Lee (D)	Larry; Combest (R)	Charlie; Gonzalez (D)	Lamar; Smith (R)	Tom; DeLay (R)	Henry; Bonilla (R)	Martin; Frost (D)	Ken; Bentsen (D)	Dick; Armey (R)	Solomon; Ortiz (D)	Ciro; Rodriguez (D)	Gene; Green (D)	Eddie; Bernice; Johnson (D)	107th (2001–2003)

=== 2003 to 2013: 32 seats ===
After the 2000 United States census, Texas gained two seats.

As typical, the delegation was redistricted for the 2002 elections. They were also redistricted in 2003, which gave Republicans a majority of seats after the 2004 elections.

Congress
108th
(2003–2005)
109th
(2005–2007)
110th
(2007–2009)
111th
(2009–2011)
112th
(2011–2013)

District										District										District										District		Congress
1st	2nd	3rd	4th	5th	6th	7th	8th	9th	10th	11th	12th	13th	14th	15th	16th	17th	18th	19th	20th	21st	22nd	23rd	24th	25th	26th	27th	28th	29th	30th	31st	32nd	Congress
Max; Sandlin (D)	Jim; Turner (D)	Sam; Johnson (R)	Ralph; Hall (D)	Jeb; Hensarling (R)	Joe; Barton (R)	John; Culberson (R)	Kevin; Brady (R)	Nick; Lampson (D)	Lloyd; Doggett (D)	Chet; Edwards (D)	Kay; Granger (R)	Mac; Thornberry (R)	Ron; Paul (R)	Rubén; Hinojosa (D)	Silver; Reyes (D)	Charles; Stenholm (D)	Sheila; Jackson; Lee (D)	Larry; Combest (R)	Charlie; Gonzalez (D)	Lamar; Smith (R)	Tom; DeLay (R)	Henry; Bonilla (R)	Martin; Frost (D)	Chris Bell (D)	Michael; C. Burgess (R)	Solomon; Ortiz (D)	Ciro; Rodriguez (D)	Gene; Green (D)	Eddie; Bernice; Johnson (D)	John; Carter (R)	Pete; Sessions (R)	108th (2003–2005)
Max; Sandlin (D)	Jim; Turner (D)	Sam; Johnson (R)	Ralph; Hall (D)	Jeb; Hensarling (R)	Joe; Barton (R)	John; Culberson (R)	Kevin; Brady (R)	Nick; Lampson (D)	Lloyd; Doggett (D)	Chet; Edwards (D)	Kay; Granger (R)	Mac; Thornberry (R)	Ron; Paul (R)	Rubén; Hinojosa (D)	Silver; Reyes (D)	Charles; Stenholm (D)	Sheila; Jackson; Lee (D)	Randy; Neugebauer (R)	Charlie; Gonzalez (D)	Lamar; Smith (R)	Tom; DeLay (R)	Henry; Bonilla (R)	Martin; Frost (D)	Chris Bell (D)	Michael; C. Burgess (R)	Solomon; Ortiz (D)	Ciro; Rodriguez (D)	Gene; Green (D)	Eddie; Bernice; Johnson (D)	John; Carter (R)	Pete; Sessions (R)	108th (2003–2005)
Louie; Gohmert (R)	Ted; Poe (R)	Sam; Johnson (R)	Ralph; Hall (R)	Jeb; Hensarling (R)	Joe; Barton (R)	John; Culberson (R)	Kevin; Brady (R)	Al; Green (D)	Michael; McCaul (R)	Mike; Conaway (R)	Kay; Granger (R)	Mac; Thornberry (R)	Ron; Paul (R)	Rubén; Hinojosa (D)	Silver; Reyes (D)	Chet; Edwards (D)	Sheila; Jackson; Lee (D)	Randy; Neugebauer (R)	Charlie; Gonzalez (D)	Lamar; Smith (R)	Tom; DeLay (R)	Henry; Bonilla (R)	Kenny; Marchant (R)	Lloyd; Doggett (D)	Michael; C. Burgess (R)	Solomon; Ortiz (D)	Henry; Cuellar (D)	Gene; Green (D)	Eddie; Bernice; Johnson (D)	John; Carter (R)	Pete; Sessions (R)	109th (2005–2007)
Louie; Gohmert (R)	Ted; Poe (R)	Sam; Johnson (R)	Ralph; Hall (R)	Jeb; Hensarling (R)	Joe; Barton (R)	John; Culberson (R)	Kevin; Brady (R)	Al; Green (D)	Michael; McCaul (R)	Mike; Conaway (R)	Kay; Granger (R)	Mac; Thornberry (R)	Ron; Paul (R)	Rubén; Hinojosa (D)	Silver; Reyes (D)	Chet; Edwards (D)	Sheila; Jackson; Lee (D)	Randy; Neugebauer (R)	Charlie; Gonzalez (D)	Lamar; Smith (R)	Shelley Sekula- Gibbs (R)	Henry; Bonilla (R)	Kenny; Marchant (R)	Lloyd; Doggett (D)	Michael; C. Burgess (R)	Solomon; Ortiz (D)	Henry; Cuellar (D)	Gene; Green (D)	Eddie; Bernice; Johnson (D)	John; Carter (R)	Pete; Sessions (R)	109th (2005–2007)
Louie; Gohmert (R)	Ted; Poe (R)	Sam; Johnson (R)	Ralph; Hall (R)	Jeb; Hensarling (R)	Joe; Barton (R)	John; Culberson (R)	Kevin; Brady (R)	Al; Green (D)	Michael; McCaul (R)	Mike; Conaway (R)	Kay; Granger (R)	Mac; Thornberry (R)	Ron; Paul (R)	Rubén; Hinojosa (D)	Silver; Reyes (D)	Chet; Edwards (D)	Sheila; Jackson; Lee (D)	Randy; Neugebauer (R)	Charlie; Gonzalez (D)	Lamar; Smith (R)	Nick; Lampson (D)	Ciro; Rodriguez (D)	Kenny; Marchant (R)	Lloyd; Doggett (D)	Michael; C. Burgess (R)	Solomon; Ortiz (D)	Henry; Cuellar (D)	Gene; Green (D)	Eddie; Bernice; Johnson (D)	John; Carter (R)	Pete; Sessions (R)	110th (2007–2009)
Louie; Gohmert (R)	Ted; Poe (R)	Sam; Johnson (R)	Ralph; Hall (R)	Jeb; Hensarling (R)	Joe; Barton (R)	John; Culberson (R)	Kevin; Brady (R)	Al; Green (D)	Michael; McCaul (R)	Mike; Conaway (R)	Kay; Granger (R)	Mac; Thornberry (R)	Ron; Paul (R)	Rubén; Hinojosa (D)	Silver; Reyes (D)	Chet; Edwards (D)	Sheila; Jackson; Lee (D)	Randy; Neugebauer (R)	Charlie; Gonzalez (D)	Lamar; Smith (R)	Pete; Olson (R)	Ciro; Rodriguez (D)	Kenny; Marchant (R)	Lloyd; Doggett (D)	Michael; C. Burgess (R)	Solomon; Ortiz (D)	Henry; Cuellar (D)	Gene; Green (D)	Eddie; Bernice; Johnson (D)	John; Carter (R)	Pete; Sessions (R)	111th (2009–2011)
Louie; Gohmert (R)	Ted; Poe (R)	Sam; Johnson (R)	Ralph; Hall (R)	Jeb; Hensarling (R)	Joe; Barton (R)	John; Culberson (R)	Kevin; Brady (R)	Al; Green (D)	Michael; McCaul (R)	Mike; Conaway (R)	Kay; Granger (R)	Mac; Thornberry (R)	Ron; Paul (R)	Rubén; Hinojosa (D)	Silver; Reyes (D)	Bill; Flores (R)	Sheila; Jackson; Lee (D)	Randy; Neugebauer (R)	Charlie; Gonzalez (D)	Lamar; Smith (R)	Pete; Olson (R)	Quico; Canseco (R)	Kenny; Marchant (R)	Lloyd; Doggett (D)	Michael; C. Burgess (R)	Blake Farent- hold (R)	Henry; Cuellar (D)	Gene; Green (D)	Eddie; Bernice; Johnson (D)	John; Carter (R)	Pete; Sessions (R)	112th (2011–2013)

=== 2013 to 2023: 36 seats ===
After the 2010 United States census, Texas gained four seats.

Congress
113th
(2013–2015)
114th
(2015–2017)
115th
(2017–2019)
116th
(2019–2021)
117th
(2021–2023)

District										District										District										District						Congress
1st	2nd	3rd	4th	5th	6th	7th	8th	9th	10th	11th	12th	13th	14th	15th	16th	17th	18th	19th	20th	21st	22nd	23rd	24th	25th	26th	27th	28th	29th	30th	31st	32nd	33rd	34th	35th	36th	Congress
Louie; Gohmert (R)	Ted; Poe (R)	Sam; Johnson (R)	Ralph; Hall (R)	Jeb; Hensarling (R)	Joe; Barton (R)	John; Culberson (R)	Kevin; Brady (R)	Al; Green (D)	Michael; McCaul (R)	Mike; Conaway (R)	Kay; Granger (R)	Mac; Thornberry (R)	Randy; Weber (R)	Rubén; Hinojosa (D)	Beto; O'Rourke (D)	Bill; Flores (R)	Sheila; Jackson; Lee (D)	Randy; Neugebauer (R)	Joaquin; Castro (D)	Lamar; Smith (R)	Pete; Olson (R)	Pete; Gallego (D)	Kenny; Marchant (R)	Roger; Williams (R)	Michael C. Burgess (R)	Blake; Farenthold (R)	Henry; Cuellar (D)	Gene; Green (D)	Eddie; Bernice; Johnson (D)	John; Carter (R)	Pete; Sessions (R)	Marc; Veasey (D)	Filemon; Vela Jr. (D)	Lloyd; Doggett (D)	Steve; Stockman (R)	113th (2013–2015)
Louie; Gohmert (R)	Ted; Poe (R)	Sam; Johnson (R)	John; Ratcliffe (R)	Jeb; Hensarling (R)	Joe; Barton (R)	John; Culberson (R)	Kevin; Brady (R)	Al; Green (D)	Michael; McCaul (R)	Mike; Conaway (R)	Kay; Granger (R)	Mac; Thornberry (R)	Randy; Weber (R)	Rubén; Hinojosa (D)	Beto; O'Rourke (D)	Bill; Flores (R)	Sheila; Jackson; Lee (D)	Randy; Neugebauer (R)	Joaquin; Castro (D)	Lamar; Smith (R)	Pete; Olson (R)	Will; Hurd (R)	Kenny; Marchant (R)	Roger; Williams (R)	Michael C. Burgess (R)	Blake; Farenthold (R)	Henry; Cuellar (D)	Gene; Green (D)	Eddie; Bernice; Johnson (D)	John; Carter (R)	Pete; Sessions (R)	Marc; Veasey (D)	Filemon; Vela Jr. (D)	Lloyd; Doggett (D)	Brian; Babin (R)	114th (2015–2017)
Louie; Gohmert (R)	Ted; Poe (R)	Sam; Johnson (R)	John; Ratcliffe (R)	Jeb; Hensarling (R)	Joe; Barton (R)	John; Culberson (R)	Kevin; Brady (R)	Al; Green (D)	Michael; McCaul (R)	Mike; Conaway (R)	Kay; Granger (R)	Mac; Thornberry (R)	Randy; Weber (R)	Vicente; Gonzalez (D)	Beto; O'Rourke (D)	Bill; Flores (R)	Sheila; Jackson; Lee (D)	Jodey; Arrington (R)	Joaquin; Castro (D)	Lamar; Smith (R)	Pete; Olson (R)	Will; Hurd (R)	Kenny; Marchant (R)	Roger; Williams (R)	Michael C. Burgess (R)	Blake; Farenthold (R)	Henry; Cuellar (D)	Gene; Green (D)	Eddie; Bernice; Johnson (D)	John; Carter (R)	Pete; Sessions (R)	Marc; Veasey (D)	Filemon; Vela Jr. (D)	Lloyd; Doggett (D)	Brian; Babin (R)	115th (2017–2019)
Louie; Gohmert (R)	Ted; Poe (R)	Sam; Johnson (R)	John; Ratcliffe (R)	Jeb; Hensarling (R)	Joe; Barton (R)	John; Culberson (R)	Kevin; Brady (R)	Al; Green (D)	Michael; McCaul (R)	Mike; Conaway (R)	Kay; Granger (R)	Mac; Thornberry (R)	Randy; Weber (R)	Vicente; Gonzalez (D)	Beto; O'Rourke (D)	Bill; Flores (R)	Sheila; Jackson; Lee (D)	Jodey; Arrington (R)	Joaquin; Castro (D)	Lamar; Smith (R)	Pete; Olson (R)	Will; Hurd (R)	Kenny; Marchant (R)	Roger; Williams (R)	Michael C. Burgess (R)	Michael; Cloud (R)	Henry; Cuellar (D)	Gene; Green (D)	Eddie; Bernice; Johnson (D)	John; Carter (R)	Pete; Sessions (R)	Marc; Veasey (D)	Filemon; Vela Jr. (D)	Lloyd; Doggett (D)	Brian; Babin (R)	115th (2017–2019)
Louie; Gohmert (R)	Dan; Crenshaw (R)	Van; Taylor (R)	John; Ratcliffe (R)	Lance; Gooden (R)	Ron; Wright (R)	Lizzie; Fletcher (D)	Kevin; Brady (R)	Al; Green (D)	Michael; McCaul (R)	Mike; Conaway (R)	Kay; Granger (R)	Mac; Thornberry (R)	Randy; Weber (R)	Vicente; Gonzalez (D)	Veronica; Escobar (D)	Bill; Flores (R)	Sheila; Jackson; Lee (D)	Jodey; Arrington (R)	Joaquin; Castro (D)	Chip; Roy (R)	Pete; Olson (R)	Will; Hurd (R)	Kenny; Marchant (R)	Roger; Williams (R)	Michael C. Burgess (R)	Michael; Cloud (R)	Henry; Cuellar (D)	Sylvia; Garcia (D)	Eddie; Bernice; Johnson (D)	John; Carter (R)	Colin; Allred (D)	Marc; Veasey (D)	Filemon; Vela Jr. (D)	Lloyd; Doggett (D)	Brian; Babin (R)	116th (2019–2021)
Louie; Gohmert (R)	Dan; Crenshaw (R)	Van; Taylor (R)	vacant	Lance; Gooden (R)	Ron; Wright (R)	Lizzie; Fletcher (D)	Kevin; Brady (R)	Al; Green (D)	Michael; McCaul (R)	Mike; Conaway (R)	Kay; Granger (R)	Mac; Thornberry (R)	Randy; Weber (R)	Vicente; Gonzalez (D)	Veronica; Escobar (D)	Bill; Flores (R)	Sheila; Jackson; Lee (D)	Jodey; Arrington (R)	Joaquin; Castro (D)	Chip; Roy (R)	Pete; Olson (R)	Will; Hurd (R)	Kenny; Marchant (R)	Roger; Williams (R)	Michael C. Burgess (R)	Michael; Cloud (R)	Henry; Cuellar (D)	Sylvia; Garcia (D)	Eddie; Bernice; Johnson (D)	John; Carter (R)	Colin; Allred (D)	Marc; Veasey (D)	Filemon; Vela Jr. (D)	Lloyd; Doggett (D)	Brian; Babin (R)	116th (2019–2021)
Louie; Gohmert (R)	Dan; Crenshaw (R)	Van; Taylor (R)	Pat; Fallon (R)	Lance; Gooden (R)	Ron; Wright (R)	Lizzie; Fletcher (D)	Kevin; Brady (R)	Al; Green (D)	Michael; McCaul (R)	August; Pfluger (R)	Kay; Granger (R)	Ronny; Jackson (R)	Randy; Weber (R)	Vicente; Gonzalez (D)	Veronica; Escobar (D)	Pete; Sessions (R)	Sheila; Jackson; Lee (D)	Jodey; Arrington (R)	Joaquin; Castro (D)	Chip; Roy (R)	Troy; Nehls (R)	Tony; Gonzales (R)	Beth Van; Duyne (R)	Roger; Williams (R)	Michael C. Burgess (R)	Michael; Cloud (R)	Henry; Cuellar (D)	Sylvia; Garcia (D)	Eddie; Bernice; Johnson (D)	John; Carter (R)	Colin; Allred (D)	Marc; Veasey (D)	Filemon; Vela Jr. (D)	Lloyd; Doggett (D)	Brian; Babin (R)	117th (2021–2023)
Louie; Gohmert (R)	Dan; Crenshaw (R)	Van; Taylor (R)	Pat; Fallon (R)	Lance; Gooden (R)	Jake; Ellzey (R)	Lizzie; Fletcher (D)	Kevin; Brady (R)	Al; Green (D)	Michael; McCaul (R)	August; Pfluger (R)	Kay; Granger (R)	Ronny; Jackson (R)	Randy; Weber (R)	Vicente; Gonzalez (D)	Veronica; Escobar (D)	Pete; Sessions (R)	Sheila; Jackson; Lee (D)	Jodey; Arrington (R)	Joaquin; Castro (D)	Chip; Roy (R)	Troy; Nehls (R)	Tony; Gonzales (R)	Beth Van; Duyne (R)	Roger; Williams (R)	Michael C. Burgess (R)	Michael; Cloud (R)	Henry; Cuellar (D)	Sylvia; Garcia (D)	Eddie; Bernice; Johnson (D)	John; Carter (R)	Colin; Allred (D)	Marc; Veasey (D)	Mayra; Flores (R)	Lloyd; Doggett (D)	Brian; Babin (R)	117th (2021–2023)

=== 2023 to present: 38 seats ===
After the 2020 United States census, Texas gained two seats.

Congress
118th
(2023–2025)
119th
(2025–2027)
120th
(2027–2029)

District										District										District										District								Congress
1st	2nd	3rd	4th	5th	6th	7th	8th	9th	10th	11th	12th	13th	14th	15th	16th	17th	18th	19th	20th	21st	22nd	23rd	24th	25th	26th	27th	28th	29th	30th	31st	32nd	33rd	34th	35th	36th	37th	38th	Congress
Nathaniel; Moran (R)	Dan; Crenshaw (R)	Keith; Self (R)	Pat; Fallon (R)	Lance; Gooden (R)	Jake; Ellzey (R)	Lizzie; Fletcher (D)	Morgan; Luttrell (R)	Al; Green (D)	Michael; McCaul (R)	August; Pfluger (R)	Kay; Granger (R)	Ronny; Jackson (R)	Randy; Weber (R)	Monica; De La Cruz (R)	Veronica; Escobar (D)	Pete; Sessions (R)	Sheila; Jackson; Lee (D)	Jodey; Arrington (R)	Joaquin; Castro (D)	Chip; Roy (R)	Troy; Nehls (R)	Tony; Gonzales (R)	Beth; Van Duyne (R)	Roger; Williams (R)	Michael C. Burgess (R)	Michael; Cloud (R)	Henry; Cuellar (D)	Sylvia; Garcia (D)	Jasmine; Crockett (D)	John; Carter (R)	Colin; Allred (D)	Marc; Veasey (D)	Vicente; Gonzalez (D)	Greg; Casar (D)	Brian; Babin (R)	Lloyd; Doggett (D)	Wesley; Hunt (R)	118th (2023–2025)
Nathaniel; Moran (R)	Dan; Crenshaw (R)	Keith; Self (R)	Pat; Fallon (R)	Lance; Gooden (R)	Jake; Ellzey (R)	Lizzie; Fletcher (D)	Morgan; Luttrell (R)	Al; Green (D)	Michael; McCaul (R)	August; Pfluger (R)	Kay; Granger (R)	Ronny; Jackson (R)	Randy; Weber (R)	Monica; De La Cruz (R)	Veronica; Escobar (D)	Pete; Sessions (R)	Erica; Lee; Carter (D)	Jodey; Arrington (R)	Joaquin; Castro (D)	Chip; Roy (R)	Troy; Nehls (R)	Tony; Gonzales (R)	Beth; Van Duyne (R)	Roger; Williams (R)	Michael C. Burgess (R)	Michael; Cloud (R)	Henry; Cuellar (D)	Sylvia; Garcia (D)	Jasmine; Crockett (D)	John; Carter (R)	Colin; Allred (D)	Marc; Veasey (D)	Vicente; Gonzalez (D)	Greg; Casar (D)	Brian; Babin (R)	Lloyd; Doggett (D)	Wesley; Hunt (R)	118th (2023–2025)
Nathaniel; Moran (R)	Dan; Crenshaw (R)	Keith; Self (R)	Pat; Fallon (R)	Lance; Gooden (R)	Jake; Ellzey (R)	Lizzie; Fletcher (D)	Morgan; Luttrell (R)	Al; Green (D)	Michael; McCaul (R)	August; Pfluger (R)	Craig; Goldman (R)	Ronny; Jackson (R)	Randy; Weber (R)	Monica; De La Cruz (R)	Veronica; Escobar (D)	Pete; Sessions (R)	Sylvester; Turner (D)	Jodey; Arrington (R)	Joaquin; Castro (D)	Chip; Roy (R)	Troy; Nehls (R)	Tony; Gonzales (R)	Beth; Van Duyne (R)	Roger; Williams (R)	Brandon; Gill (R)	Michael; Cloud (R)	Henry; Cuellar (D)	Sylvia; Garcia (D)	Jasmine; Crockett (D)	John; Carter (R)	Julie; Johnson (D)	Marc; Veasey (D)	Vicente; Gonzalez (D)	Greg; Casar (D)	Brian; Babin (R)	Lloyd; Doggett (D)	Wesley; Hunt (R)	119th (2025–2027)
Nathaniel; Moran (R)	Dan; Crenshaw (R)	Keith; Self (R)	Pat; Fallon (R)	Lance; Gooden (R)	Jake; Ellzey (R)	Lizzie; Fletcher (D)	Morgan; Luttrell (R)	Al; Green (D)	Michael; McCaul (R)	August; Pfluger (R)	Craig; Goldman (R)	Ronny; Jackson (R)	Randy; Weber (R)	Monica; De La Cruz (R)	Veronica; Escobar (D)	Pete; Sessions (R)	Christian; Menefee (D)	Jodey; Arrington (R)	Joaquin; Castro (D)	Chip; Roy (R)	Troy; Nehls (R)	vacant	Beth; Van Duyne (R)	Roger; Williams (R)	Brandon; Gill (R)	Michael; Cloud (R)	Henry; Cuellar (D)	Sylvia; Garcia (D)	Jasmine; Crockett (D)	John; Carter (R)	Julie; Johnson (D)	Marc; Veasey (D)	Vicente; Gonzalez (D)	Greg; Casar (D)	Brian; Babin (R)	Lloyd; Doggett (D)	Wesley; Hunt (R)	119th (2025–2027)
Nathaniel; Moran (R)	Steve; Toth (R)	Keith; Self (R)	Pat; Fallon (R)	Lance; Gooden (R)	Jake; Ellzey (R)	Lizzie; Fletcher (D)	Jessica; Steinmann (R)	Leticia; Gutierrez (D)	Chris; Gober (R)	August; Pfluger (R)	Craig; Goldman (R)	Ronny; Jackson (R)	Randy; Weber (R)	Bobby; Pulido (D)	Veronica; Escobar (D)	Pete; Sessions (R)	Christian; Menefee (D)	Tom; Sell (R)	Joaquin; Castro (D)	Mark; Teixeira (R)	Trever; Nehls (R)	Katy; Padilla Stout (D)	Beth; Van Duyne (R)	Roger; Williams (R)	Brandon; Gill (R)	Michael; Cloud (R)	Henry; Cuellar (D)	Sylvia; Garcia (D)	Frederick; Haynes III (D)	John; Carter (R)	Jace; Yarbrough (R)	Colin; Allred (R)	Vicente; Gonzalez (D)	Johnny; Garcia (D)a	Brian; Babin (R)	Greg; Casar (D)	Jon; Bonck (R)	120th (2027–2029)

== U.S. Senate ==
Current U.S. senators from Texas
Texas CPVI (2025): R+6	Class I senator	Class II senator
Texas CPVI (2025): R+6	Ted Cruz (Junior senator) (Houston)	John Cornyn (Senior senator) (Austin)
Party	Republican	Republican
Incumbent since	January 3, 2013	December 2, 2002

Class I senator	Congress	Class II senator
Thomas Jefferson Rusk (D)	29th (1845–1847)	Sam Houston (D)
Thomas Jefferson Rusk (D)	30th (1847–1849)	Sam Houston (D)
Thomas Jefferson Rusk (D)	31st (1849–1851)	Sam Houston (D)
Thomas Jefferson Rusk (D)	32nd (1851–1853)	Sam Houston (D)
Thomas Jefferson Rusk (D)	33rd (1853–1855)	Sam Houston (KN)
Thomas Jefferson Rusk (D)	34th (1855–1857)	Sam Houston (KN)
Thomas Jefferson Rusk (D)	35th (1857–1859)	Sam Houston (I)
J. Pinckney Henderson (D)	35th (1857–1859)	Sam Houston (I)
Matthias Ward (D)	35th (1857–1859)	Sam Houston (I)
Matthias Ward (D)	36th (1859–1861)	John Hemphill (D)
Louis Wigfall (D)	36th (1859–1861)	John Hemphill (D)
American Civil War	37th (1861–1863)	American Civil War
American Civil War	38th (1863–1865)	American Civil War
American Civil War	39th (1865–1867)	American Civil War
American Civil War	40th (1867–1869)	American Civil War
J. W. Flanagan (R)	41st (1869–1871)	Morgan C. Hamilton (R)
J. W. Flanagan (R)	42nd (1871–1873)	Morgan C. Hamilton (R)
J. W. Flanagan (R)	43rd (1873–1875)	Morgan C. Hamilton (LR)
Samuel B. Maxey (D)	44th (1875–1877)	Morgan C. Hamilton (R)
Samuel B. Maxey (D)	45th (1877–1879)	Richard Coke (D)
Samuel B. Maxey (D)	46th (1879–1881)	Richard Coke (D)
Samuel B. Maxey (D)	47th (1881–1883)	Richard Coke (D)
Samuel B. Maxey (D)	48th (1883–1885)	Richard Coke (D)
Samuel B. Maxey (D)	49th (1885–1887)	Richard Coke (D)
John H. Reagan (D)	50th (1887–1889)	Richard Coke (D)
John H. Reagan (D)	51st (1889–1891)	Richard Coke (D)
John H. Reagan (D)	52nd (1891–1893)	Richard Coke (D)
Horace Chilton (D)	52nd (1891–1893)	Richard Coke (D)
Roger Q. Mills (D)	52nd (1891–1893)	Richard Coke (D)
Roger Q. Mills (D)	53rd (1893–1895)	Richard Coke (D)
Roger Q. Mills (D)	54th (1895–1897)	Horace Chilton (D)
Roger Q. Mills (D)	55th (1897–1899)	Horace Chilton (D)
Charles A. Culberson (D)	56th (1899–1901)	Horace Chilton (D)
Charles A. Culberson (D)	57th (1901–1903)	Joseph W. Bailey (D)
Charles A. Culberson (D)	58th (1903–1905)	Joseph W. Bailey (D)
Charles A. Culberson (D)	59th (1905–1907)	Joseph W. Bailey (D)
Charles A. Culberson (D)	60th (1907–1909)	Joseph W. Bailey (D)
Charles A. Culberson (D)	61st (1909–1911)	Joseph W. Bailey (D)
Charles A. Culberson (D)	62nd (1911–1913)	Joseph W. Bailey (D)
Charles A. Culberson (D)	62nd (1911–1913)	Rienzi Melville Johnston (D)
Charles A. Culberson (D)	62nd (1911–1913)	Morris Sheppard (D)
Charles A. Culberson (D)	63rd (1913–1915)	Morris Sheppard (D)
Charles A. Culberson (D)	64th (1915–1917)	Morris Sheppard (D)
Charles A. Culberson (D)	65th (1917–1919)	Morris Sheppard (D)
Charles A. Culberson (D)	66th (1919–1921)	Morris Sheppard (D)
Charles A. Culberson (D)	67th (1921–1923)	Morris Sheppard (D)
Earle B. Mayfield (D)	68th (1923–1925)	Morris Sheppard (D)
Earle B. Mayfield (D)	69th (1925–1927)	Morris Sheppard (D)
Earle B. Mayfield (D)	70th (1927–1929)	Morris Sheppard (D)
Tom Connally (D)	71st (1929–1931)	Morris Sheppard (D)
Tom Connally (D)	72nd (1931–1933)	Morris Sheppard (D)
Tom Connally (D)	73rd (1933–1935)	Morris Sheppard (D)
Tom Connally (D)	74th (1935–1937)	Morris Sheppard (D)
Tom Connally (D)	75th (1937–1939)	Morris Sheppard (D)
Tom Connally (D)	76th (1939–1941)	Morris Sheppard (D)
Tom Connally (D)	77th (1941–1943)	Morris Sheppard (D)
Tom Connally (D)	77th (1941–1943)	Andrew Jackson Houston (D)
Tom Connally (D)	77th (1941–1943)	W. Lee O'Daniel (D)
Tom Connally (D)	78th (1943–1945)	W. Lee O'Daniel (D)
Tom Connally (D)	79th (1945–1947)	W. Lee O'Daniel (D)
Tom Connally (D)	80th (1947–1949)	W. Lee O'Daniel (D)
Tom Connally (D)	81st (1949–1951)	Lyndon B. Johnson (D)
Tom Connally (D)	82nd (1951–1953)	Lyndon B. Johnson (D)
Price Daniel (D)	83rd (1953–1955)	Lyndon B. Johnson (D)
Price Daniel (D)	84th (1955–1957)	Lyndon B. Johnson (D)
Price Daniel (D)	85th (1957–1959)	Lyndon B. Johnson (D)
William A. Blakley (D)	85th (1957–1959)	Lyndon B. Johnson (D)
Ralph Yarborough (D)	85th (1957–1959)	Lyndon B. Johnson (D)
Ralph Yarborough (D)	86th (1959–1961)	Lyndon B. Johnson (D)
Ralph Yarborough (D)	87th (1961–1963)	William A. Blakley (D)
Ralph Yarborough (D)	87th (1961–1963)	John Tower (R)
Ralph Yarborough (D)	88th (1963–1965)	John Tower (R)
Ralph Yarborough (D)	89th (1965–1967)	John Tower (R)
Ralph Yarborough (D)	90th (1967–1969)	John Tower (R)
Ralph Yarborough (D)	91st (1969–1971)	John Tower (R)
Lloyd Bentsen (D)	92nd (1971–1973)	John Tower (R)
Lloyd Bentsen (D)	93rd (1973–1975)	John Tower (R)
Lloyd Bentsen (D)	94th (1975–1977)	John Tower (R)
Lloyd Bentsen (D)	95th (1977–1979)	John Tower (R)
Lloyd Bentsen (D)	96th (1979–1981)	John Tower (R)
Lloyd Bentsen (D)	97th (1981–1983)	John Tower (R)
Lloyd Bentsen (D)	98th (1983–1985)	John Tower (R)
Lloyd Bentsen (D)	99th (1985–1987)	Phil Gramm (R)
Lloyd Bentsen (D)	100th (1987–1989)	Phil Gramm (R)
Lloyd Bentsen (D)	101st (1989–1991)	Phil Gramm (R)
Lloyd Bentsen (D)	102nd (1991–1993)	Phil Gramm (R)
Lloyd Bentsen (D)	103rd (1993–1995)	Phil Gramm (R)
Bob Krueger (D)	103rd (1993–1995)	Phil Gramm (R)
Kay Bailey Hutchison (R)	103rd (1993–1995)	Phil Gramm (R)
Kay Bailey Hutchison (R)	104th (1995–1997)	Phil Gramm (R)
Kay Bailey Hutchison (R)	105th (1997–1999)	Phil Gramm (R)
Kay Bailey Hutchison (R)	106th (1999–2001)	Phil Gramm (R)
Kay Bailey Hutchison (R)	107th (2001–2003)	Phil Gramm (R)
Kay Bailey Hutchison (R)	108th (2003–2005)	John Cornyn (R)
Kay Bailey Hutchison (R)	109th (2005–2007)	John Cornyn (R)
Kay Bailey Hutchison (R)	110th (2007–2009)	John Cornyn (R)
Kay Bailey Hutchison (R)	111th (2009–2011)	John Cornyn (R)
Kay Bailey Hutchison (R)	112th (2011–2013)	John Cornyn (R)
Ted Cruz (R)	113th (2013–2015)	John Cornyn (R)
Ted Cruz (R)	114th (2015–2017)	John Cornyn (R)
Ted Cruz (R)	115th (2017–2019)	John Cornyn (R)
Ted Cruz (R)	116th (2019–2021)	John Cornyn (R)
Ted Cruz (R)	117th (2021–2023)	John Cornyn (R)
Ted Cruz (R)	118th (2023–2025)	John Cornyn (R)
Ted Cruz (R)	119th (2025–2027)	John Cornyn (R)
Ted Cruz (R)	120th (2027–2029)	James Talarico (D)

== Key ==
Democratic (D)
Greenback (GB)
Independent Democrat (ID)
Know Nothing (KN)
Liberal Republican (LR)
Republican (R)
Independent (I)

== See also ==
- List of United States congressional districts
- Political party strength in Texas
- Redistricting in Texas
