= Judge Sabin =

Judge Sabin

- Chauncey Brewer Sabin (1824–1890), judge of the United States District Court for the Eastern District of Texas
- George Myron Sabin (1834–1890), judge of the United States District Court for the District of Nevada
