= Robert Lively =

Robert Lively may refer to:

- Robert M. Lively (1855–1929), U.S. Representative from Texas
- Robert Lively (screenwriter) (died 1943), American screenwriter and songwriter
