= Colfax, Texas =

Unincorporated community in Texas, US

- Unincorporated community
- Location within the state of Texas Colfax, Texas (the United States)
- Coordinates: 32°30′38″N 95°43′58″W
- Country: United States
- State: Texas
- County: Van Zandt
- Elevation: 568 ft (173 m)
- Time zone: UTC-6 (Central (CST))
  - Summer (DST): UTC-5 (CDT)
- Area codes: 903, 430
- GNIS feature ID: 1378142

Colfax is an unincorporated populated place in Van Zandt County, Texas, United States. It is located within the Dallas/Fort Worth Metroplex and had a population of 35 in 2000.

== History ==
The settlement was originally named "Cold Water" and began as a log house that was used for religious services. An early settler, Elisha Tunnell, erected a church at that location known as "Tunnell's Chapel". The settlement was renamed "Colfax" in honor of United States Vice President Schuyler Colfax. The Colfax post office was located at the settlement in 1870 and remained in operation until 1905, after which mail was delivered from Canton. The donated land had also been the location of two local churches that hosted Methodist and Cumberland Presbyterian congregations in 1885. The location was also the site of revivals and summer camp meetings. Colfax had a population of 30 between 1885 and 1895 and grew to around 100 in the 1930s. Residents grew fruits and vegetables and the community had three churches, a cemetery, and several businesses and houses at its peak. It declined to 28 in 1968 and grew to 35 from 1974 through 2000. It further grew to 44 in 2010.

Another early settler named Kellam donated 5 acres (2.0 ha) of land, and on part of it, a cemetery was established. The first burial, in 1884, was of Elisha Tunnell.

Colfax had a Masonic Lodge (number 904) in 1919. During the 1920s, Colfax had a boys basketball team which competed against local teams.

== Geography ==
Colfax is located at the headspring of the Neches River on Farm to Market Road 16, 8 mi (13 km) southeast of Canton in southeastern Van Zandt County.

== Education ==
Colfax had a school located in Tunnell's Chapel in the late 1870s. The community then had a brick schoolhouse. The school hosted 122 students in 1906, and its local Grange and Masonic organizations met at the schoolhouse for revivals and church services. It was eventually razed when it joined the Van Independent School District in 1929.

== Notable person ==
- Brady P. Gentry (1896–1966), politician
