= David Ezekiel Bryant =

American judge

Judge of the United States District Court for the Eastern District of Texas
- In office May 27, 1890 – February 5, 1910
- Appointed by: Benjamin Harrison
- Preceded by: Chauncey Brewer Sabin
- Succeeded by: Gordon J. Russell

Personal details
- Born: David Ezekiel Bryant; October 19, 1849 LaRue County, Kentucky, U.S.
- Died: February 5, 1910 (aged 60) Sherman, Texas, U.S.
- Education: Duke University (A.B.) read law

David Ezekiel Bryant (October 19, 1849 – February 5, 1910) was a United States district judge of the United States District Court for the Eastern District of Texas.

== Education and career ==
Born in LaRue County, Kentucky, Bryant received an Artium Baccalaureus degree from Trinity College (now Duke University) in 1871, and read law to enter the bar in 1873. He was in private practice in Sherman, Texas, from 1873 to 1890.

== Federal judicial service ==
On May 3, 1890, Bryant was nominated by President Benjamin Harrison to a seat on the United States District Court for the Eastern District of Texas vacated by Judge Chauncey Brewer Sabin. Bryant was confirmed by the United States Senate on May 27, 1890, and received his commission the same day, serving thereafter until his death on February 5, 1910, in Sherman.

== Sources ==
Legal offices
Preceded by Chauncey Brewer Sabin	Judge of the United States District Court for the Eastern District of Texas; 1890–1910	Succeeded by Gordon J. Russell
