= David John Wilson =

United States Judge (1887-1976)

Senior Judge of the United States Customs Court
- In office April 1, 1966 – April 23, 1976

Judge of the United States Customs Court
- In office July 26, 1954 – April 1, 1966
- Appointed by: Dwight D. Eisenhower
- Preceded by: William Purington Cole Jr.
- Succeeded by: Lindley Beckworth

Personal details
- Born: David John Wilson; October 27, 1887 Midway, Utah
- Died: April 23, 1976 (aged 88) Salt Lake City, Utah
- Education: Brigham Young University (B.S.); UC Berkeley School of Law (J.D.)

David John Wilson (October 27, 1887 – April 23, 1976) was a judge of the United States Customs Court.

== Education and career ==
Born on October 27, 1887, in Midway, Utah, Wilson received a Bachelor of Science degree in 1914 from Brigham Young University and a Juris Doctor in 1919 from the UC Berkeley School of Law. He worked in private practice in Ogden, Utah from 1919 to 1954. He served as attorney for Weber County, Utah from 1920 to 1925. He served District Attorney in Ogden from 1928 to 1933.

== Federal Judicial Service ==
Wilson was nominated by President Dwight D. Eisenhower on July 7, 1954, to a seat on the United States Customs Court vacated by Judge William Purington Cole Jr. He was confirmed by the United States Senate on July 24, 1954, and received his commission on July 26, 1954. Wilson was initially appointed as a Judge under Article I, but the court was raised to Article III status by operation of law on July 14, 1956, and Wilson thereafter served as an Article III Judge. He assumed senior status on April 1, 1966. His service terminated on April 23, 1976, due to his death in Salt Lake City, Utah. He was succeeded by Judge Lindley Beckworth.

== Sources ==
Legal offices
Preceded by William Purington Cole Jr.	Judge of the United States Customs Court; 1954–1966	Succeeded by Lindley Beckworth
