= Gordon J. Russell =

American judge (1859–1919)

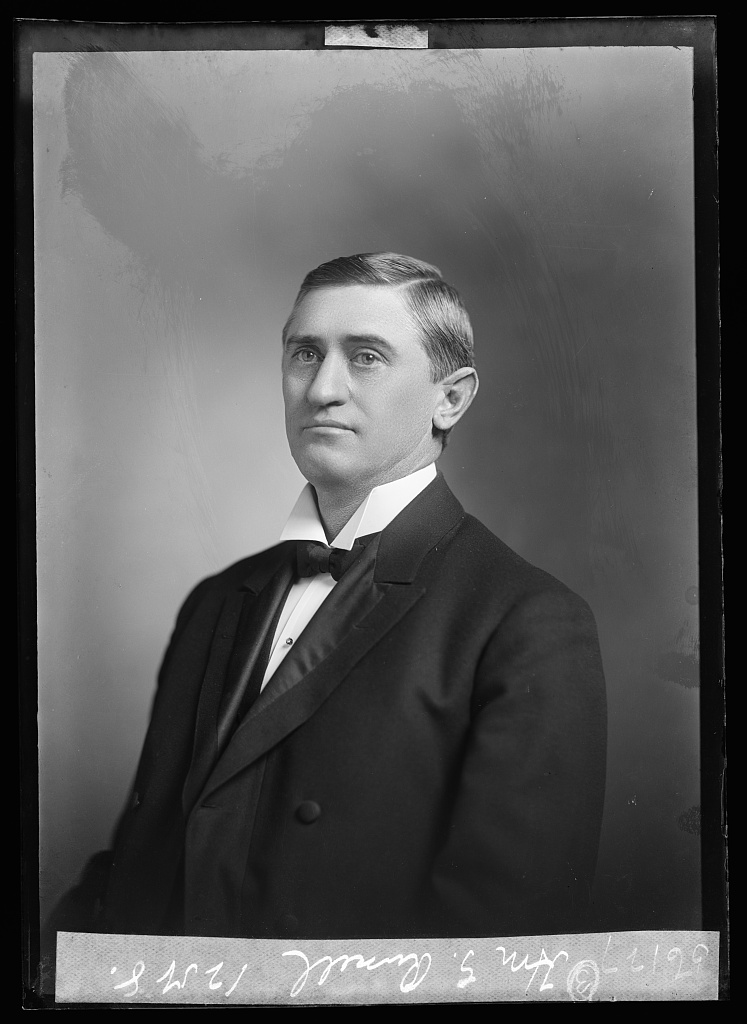

Judge of the United States District Court for the Eastern District of Texas
- In office June 6, 1910 – September 14, 1919
- Appointed by: William Howard Taft
- Preceded by: David Ezekiel Bryant
- Succeeded by: William Lee Estes

Member of the U.S. House of Representatives from Texas's 3rd district
- In office November 4, 1902 – June 14, 1910
- Preceded by: Reese C. De Graffenreid
- Succeeded by: Robert M. Lively

Personal details
- Born: Gordon James Russell; December 22, 1859 Huntsville, Alabama, U.S.
- Died: September 14, 1919 (aged 59) Kerrville, Texas, U.S.
- Resting place: Oakwood Cemetery; Tyler, Texas
- Party: Democratic
- Education: University of Georgia (A.B.) read law

Gordon James Russell (December 22, 1859 – September 14, 1919) was a United States representative from Texas and a United States district judge of the United States District Court for the Eastern District of Texas.

Russell was nominated by President William H. Taft on May 27, 1910, to a seat vacated by David E. Bryant. He was confirmed by the United States Senate on June 6, 1910, and received his commission the same day. Russell served until his death on September 14, 1919.

== Education and career ==
Born on December 22, 1859, in Huntsville, Alabama, Russell attended the common schools, the Sam Bailey Institute in Griffin, Georgia and Crawford High School in Dalton, Georgia. He received an Artium Baccalaureus degree in 1877 from the University of Georgia and read law the same year. He taught school in Dalton. He was admitted to the bar and entered private practice in Dalton from 1878 to 1879. He was in private practice in Texas from 1879 to 1884. He was in private practice in Van Zandt County, Texas from 1884 to 1895. He was a Judge of the Van Zandt County Court from 1890 to 1892. He resumed private practice in Willsport, Texas, starting in 1892. He was district attorney for the Seventh Judicial District of Texas from 1892 to 1896. He continued private practice in Tyler, Texas, starting in 1895. He was a Judge of the Texas District Court for the Seventh Judicial District from 1896 to 1902.

== Congressional service ==
Russell was elected as a Democrat to the United States House of Representatives of the 57th United States Congress to fill the vacancy caused by the death of United States Representative Reese C. De Graffenreid. He was reelected to the 58th United States Congress and to the three succeeding Congresses and served from November 4, 1902, to June 14, 1910, when he resigned to accept a federal judicial post.

== Federal judicial service ==
Russell was nominated by President William Howard Taft on May 27, 1910, to a seat on the United States District Court for the Eastern District of Texas vacated by Judge David Ezekiel Bryant. He was confirmed by the United States Senate on June 6, 1910, and received his commission the same day. His service terminated on September 14, 1919, due to his death in Kerrville, Texas. He was interred in Oakwood Cemetery in Tyler, Texas.

== Sources ==
- "Gordon James Russell". Biographical Directory of the United States Congress.

U.S. House of Representatives
Preceded by Reese C. De Graffenreid	Member of the U.S. House of Representatives from Texas's 3rd congressional district 1902–1910	Succeeded by Robert M. Lively
Legal offices
Preceded by David Ezekiel Bryant	Judge of the United States District Court for the Eastern District of Texas; 1910–1919	Succeeded by William Lee Estes
