= Morgan G. Sanders =

American politician

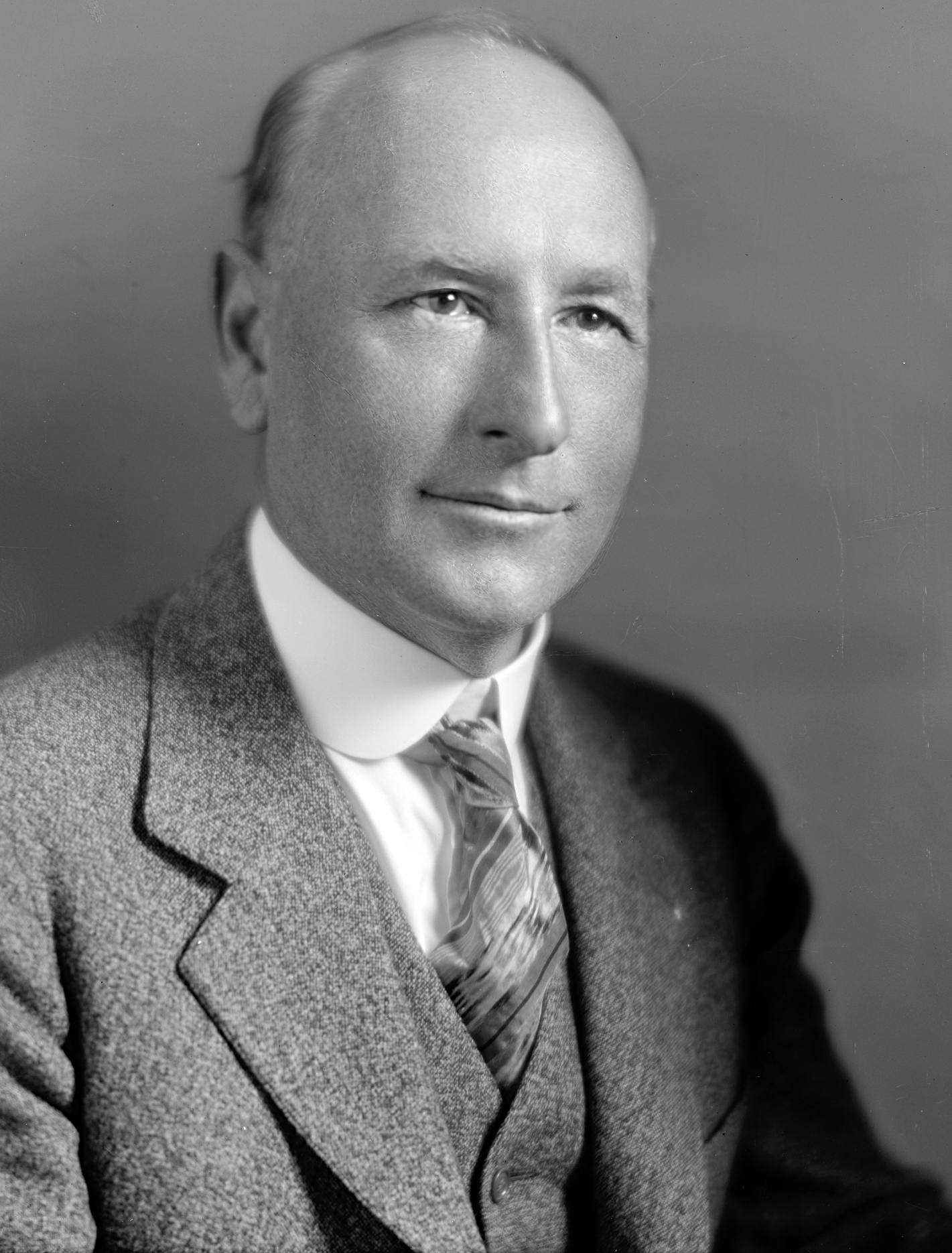
- Morgan G. Sanders, former US Representative from Texas.

Member of the U.S. House of Representatives from Texas's 3rd district
- In office March 4, 1921 – January 3, 1939
- Preceded by: James Young
- Succeeded by: Lindley Beckworth

Member of the Texas House of Representatives from the 30th district
- In office January 13, 1903 – January 8, 1907

Personal details
- Born: Morgan Gurley Sanders; July 14, 1878 near Ben Wheeler, Texas, US
- Died: January 7, 1956 (aged 77)
- Party: Democratic
- Education: Alamo Institute; University of Texas at Austin

Morgan Gurley Sanders (July 14, 1878 – January 7, 1956) was a U.S. representative from Texas.

Born near Ben Wheeler, Texas, Sanders attended the public schools. He graduated from Alamo Institute and taught school for three years. He owned and published a weekly newspaper. He studied law at the University of Texas at Austin, was admitted to the bar in 1901, and commenced practice in Canton, Texas. He represented Canton as a member of the Texas House of Representatives for the 30th district from 1903 to 1907. He served as prosecuting attorney of Van Zandt County from 1910 to 1914, and as district attorney of the seventh judicial district of Texas in 1915 and 1916. After retiring as district attorney, he resumed the practice of law in Canton, Texas. He served as delegate to many Democratic State conventions.

Sanders was elected as a Democrat to the Sixty-seventh and to the eight succeeding Congresses (March 4, 1921 – January 3, 1939).

He was interred in Hillcrest Cemetery, Canton, Texas.

== Sources ==
- United States Congress. "Morgan G. Sanders (id: S000037)". Biographical Directory of the United States Congress.

U.S. House of Representatives
Preceded by James Young	Member of the U.S. House of Representatives from Texas's 3rd congressional district 1921–1939	Succeeded by Lindley Beckworth
