= Chauncey Brewer Sabin =

American judge

Judge of the United States District Court for the Eastern District of Texas
- In office April 5, 1884 – March 30, 1890
- Appointed by: Chester A. Arthur
- Preceded by: Amos Morrill
- Succeeded by: David Ezekiel Bryant

Member of the Texas House of Representatives
- In office 1873

Personal details
- Born: Chauncey Brewer Sabin; August 6, 1824 Oneonta, New York, U.S.
- Died: March 30, 1890 (aged 65) Galveston, Texas, U.S.
- Education: read law

Chauncey Brewer Sabin (August 6, 1824 – March 30, 1890) was a United States district judge of the United States District Court for the Eastern District of Texas.

== Education and career ==
Born in Oneonta, New York, Sabin read law to enter the bar in 1846. He was in private practice in Albany, New York from 1846 to 1847, in Houston, Texas from 1847 to 1861, in New York City, New York from 1863 to 1865, in Houston from 1865 to 1866, and in Washington, D.C., from 1866 to 1867. He was a Judge of the Third Judicial District of Texas from 1867 to 1868. He was in private practice in Washington, D.C. from 1868 to 1870. He was appointed as a Justice of the Supreme Court of Texas by military authorities during the Reconstruction Era, in March 1870, but no record of service has been found to indicate that he actually served in this capacity. He was a Judge of the District Court of Texas, Galveston District in 1871. He was city attorney of Galveston, Texas from 1872 to 1873. He was a member of the Texas House of Representatives in 1873. He was Postmaster of Galveston from 1874 to 1882. He was in private practice in Galveston from 1882 to 1884.

== Federal judicial service ==
Sabin was nominated by President Chester A. Arthur on March 25, 1884, to a seat on the United States District Court for the Eastern District of Texas vacated by Judge Amos Morrill. He was confirmed by the United States Senate on April 5, 1884, and received his commission the same day. His service terminated on March 30, 1890, due to his death in Galveston.

Legal offices
Preceded by Colbert Caldwell	Justice of the Texas Supreme Court; 1870–1870	Succeeded by Andrew Jackson Hamilton
Preceded by Amos Morrill	Judge of the United States District Court for the Eastern District of Texas; 1884–1890	Succeeded by David Ezekiel Bryant
