= Brady P. Gentry =

American politician and lawyer (1896–1966)

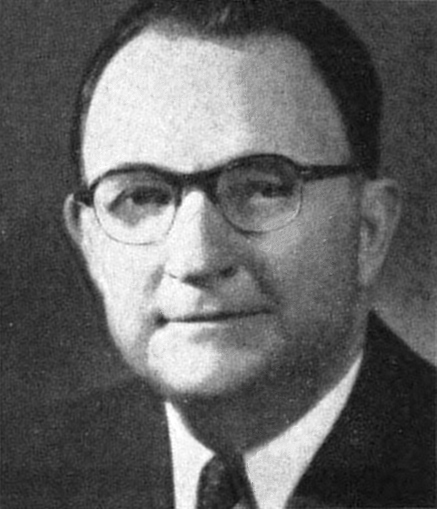
- Gentry in 1955

Member of the U.S. House of Representatives from Texas's 3rd district
- In office January 3, 1953 – January 3, 1957
- Preceded by: Lindley Beckworth
- Succeeded by: Lindley Beckworth

Personal details
- Born: Brady Preston Gentry; March 25, 1896 Colfax, Texas, US
- Died: November 9, 1966 (aged 70) Houston, Texas, US
- Party: Democratic
- Education: East Texas State College; Cumberland University
- Profession: Politician, lawyer

Military service
- Allegiance: United States
- Branch/service: United States Army
- Years of service: 1918
- Rank: Captain
- Battles/wars: World War I

Brady Preston Gentry (March 25, 1896 – November 9, 1966) was an American politician and lawyer. A Democrat, he was a member of the United States House of Representatives from Texas.

Born in Van Zandt County, Gentry studied law and fought in World War I. He then moved to Tyler, where he practiced law and worked in the public sector. The head of various transportation organizations, he helped create the road system of the United States. He served in the House from 1953 to 1957.

== Early life and education ==
Gentry was born on March 25, 1896, on a farm near Colfax, Texas, the son of Benjamin Whitfield Gentry and Virginia Caroline (née McPhail) Gentry. Educated at public schools, he studied at Cumberland School of Law, East Texas A&M University, and Tyler Commercial College.

== Career ==
In 1918, during World War I, Gentry served in France with the American Expeditionary Forces and was ranked captain. He was a clerk to the Van Zandt County tax collector, and became tax collector of Tyler after moving there. He read law, and at age 21, was admitted to the bar, after which he began practicing in Tyler.

From 1921 to 1924, Gentry was district attorney of Smith County, and from 1931 to 1939, was county judge. As judge, he helped develop the county's road system. He was chairman of the Texas Department of Transportation from 1939 to 1945, the first to serve a full term of the office, having been appointed by Governor W. Lee O'Daniel. In 1943, he was named president of the American Association of State Highway and Transportation Officials, and for a time was director of the Texas Good Roads Association.

Gentry was a Democrat. He was a member of the United States House of Representatives, from January 3, 1953, to January 3, 1957, representing Texas's 3rd district. While serving, he was a member of the Committees on Public Works and on Transportation and Infrastructure, helping establish the Interstate Highway System. He was not nominated for the following election. Ideologically, he was conservative, being the most conservative Democrat of either Congress he served in.

After serving in Congress, Gentry returned to practicing law. He was offered chairmanship of the Texas Highway Commission, but refused to pursue a career in the private sector. He supported Southern Methodist University and was a benefactor of Tyler Junior College.

== Death and legacy ==
Gentry never married. He died on November 9, 1966, aged 70, in Houston, and was buried at Rose Hill Cemetery, in Tyler.

The Gentry Gym of Tyler Junior College is named for him. Two commemorative plaque are commemorated to him: one in Tyler, and one near Van, installed September 24, 1967.

U.S. House of Representatives
Preceded by Lindley Beckworth	Member of the U.S. House of Representatives from Texas's 3rd congressional district 1953–1957	Succeeded by Lindley Beckworth
