= Reese C. De Graffenreid =

American politician

Reese Calhoun De Graffenreid
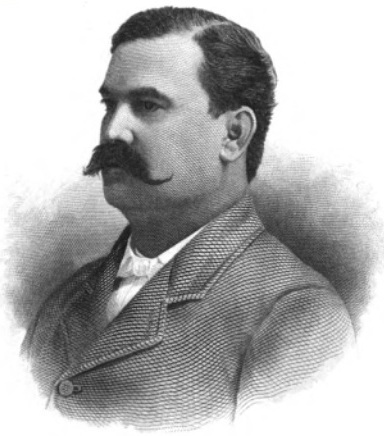

Member of the U.S. House of Representatives from Texas's 3rd district
- In office March 4, 1897 – August 29, 1902
- Preceded by: Charles Henderson Yoakum
- Succeeded by: Gordon J. Russell

Personal details
- Born: May 7, 1859 Franklin, Tennessee, U.S.
- Died: August 29, 1902 (aged 43) Washington, D.C., U.S.
- Party: Democratic
- Profession: lawyer

Reese Calhoun De Graffenreid (May 7, 1859 – August 29, 1902) was a U.S. representative from Texas.

Born in Franklin, Tennessee, De Graffenreid attended the common schools of Franklin and the University of Tennessee at Knoxville. He graduated from the law department of Cumberland University, Lebanon, Tennessee. He was admitted to the bar in 1879 and commenced practice in Franklin. He moved to Chattanooga, Tennessee, where he practiced his profession for one year, and then moved to Texas. He helped in the construction of the Texas & Pacific Railroad. He resumed the practice of law at Longview, Texas in 1883.

De Graffenreid was elected county attorney and resigned two months afterward. He was an unsuccessful candidate for election in 1890 to the Fifty-second Congress.

De Graffenreid was elected as a Democrat to the Fifty-fifth, Fifty-sixth, and Fifty-seventh Congresses and served from March 4, 1897, until his death in Washington, D.C., August 29, 1902. He was interred in Greenwood Cemetery, Longview, Texas.

== See also ==
- List of members of the United States Congress who died in office (1900–1949)

== Sources ==
- United States Congress. "Reese C. De Graffenreid (id: D000194)". Biographical Directory of the United States Congress.
- Memorial addresses on the life and character of Reese C. De Graffenreid late a representative from Texas delivered in the House of Representatives and Senate frontispiece 1903

U.S. House of Representatives
Preceded by Charles H. Yoakum	Member of the U.S. House of Representatives from Texas's 3rd congressional district March 4, 1897 – August 29, 1902	Succeeded by Gordon J. Russell
