= Lindley Beckworth =

American politician (1913–1984)

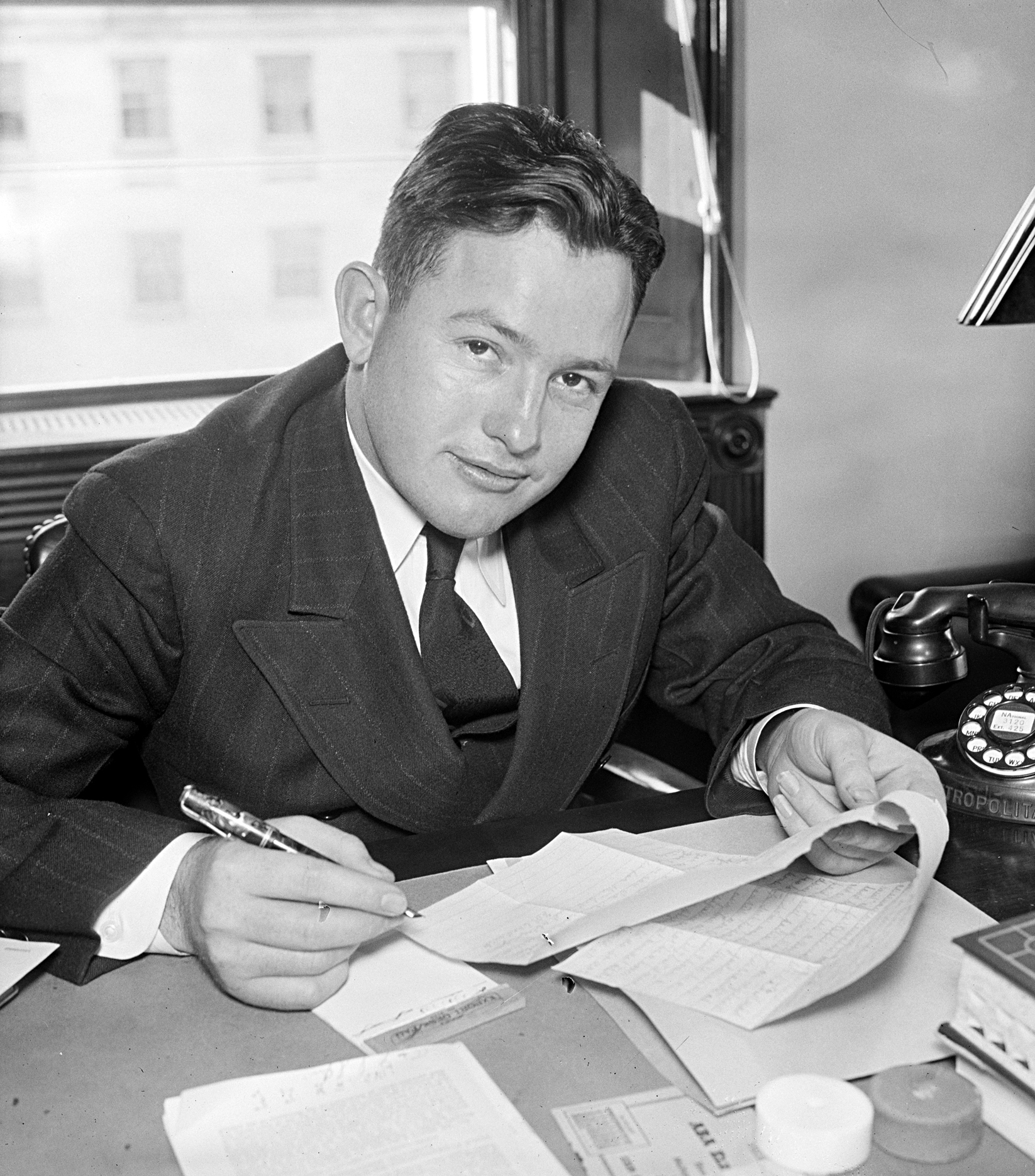
- Beckworth in 1938

Judge of the United States Customs Court
- In office March 4, 1967 – August 31, 1968
- Appointed by: Lyndon B. Johnson
- Preceded by: David John Wilson
- Succeeded by: Edward D. Re

Member of the U.S. House of Representatives from Texas's 3rd district
- In office January 3, 1957 – January 3, 1967
- Preceded by: Brady P. Gentry
- Succeeded by: Ray Roberts (redistricting)
- In office January 3, 1939 – January 3, 1953
- Preceded by: Morgan G. Sanders
- Succeeded by: Brady P. Gentry

Personal details
- Born: Lindley Garrison Beckworth; June 30, 1913 Mabank, Texas, U.S.
- Died: March 9, 1984 (aged 70) Tyler, Texas, U.S.
- Resting place: Rose Hill Cemetery; Tyler, Texas
- Party: Democratic

Lindley Garrison Beckworth Sr. (June 30, 1913 – March 9, 1984) was an American judge and politician who served as a United States representative from Texas and a judge of the United States Customs Court.

== Education and career ==
Born on June 30, 1913, on a farm in the South Bouie community of Mabank, Kaufman County, Texas, Beckworth attended the rural schools of his home county, then attended Abilene Christian College, East Texas State Teachers College now East Texas A&M University, Commerce, Texas, Sam Houston State Teachers College (now Sam Houston State University), and Southern Methodist University in Dallas, Texas. He was a teacher in Upshur County, Texas from 1932 to 1936. He was admitted to the bar in 1937 and commenced practice in Gilmer, Texas. He was a member of the Texas House of Representatives from 1936 to 1938. He was a United States representative from Texas from 1939 to 1953 and again from 1957 to 1967. He was in private practice in Longview, Texas from 1954 to 1958.

== Congressional service ==
Beckworth was elected as a Democrat to the 76th Congress and to the six succeeding Congresses from January 3, 1939, to January 3, 1953, from Texas's 3rd congressional district. He was not a candidate for renomination in 1952, and was an unsuccessful candidate for the Democratic nomination for United States Senator from Texas in 1952. He was elected to the 85th Congress and to the four succeeding Congresses from January 3, 1957, to January 3, 1967, from the 3rd district. He was an unsuccessful candidate for renomination in 1966. During his time in Congress, Beckworth developed a mostly liberal voting record; based on certain criteria.

== Federal judicial service ==
Beckworth was nominated by President Lyndon B. Johnson on January 16, 1967, to a seat on the United States Customs Court vacated by Judge David John Wilson. He was confirmed by the United States Senate on March 2, 1967, and received his commission on March 4, 1967. His service terminated on August 31, 1968, due to his resignation.

== Post judicial service and death ==
After resigning from the federal bench, Beckworth briefly practiced law in Longview in 1969. He served as a member of the Texas Senate from 1970 to 1972. He resumed private practice in Longview from 1974 until his death in Tyler, Texas, on March 9, 1984, residing in Gladewater, Texas during his final years. He was buried in Rose Hill Cemetery in Tyler.

== Sources ==
- "Lindley Beckworth". Biographical Directory of the United States Congress.
- Lawrence A. Landis, "BECKWORTH, LINDLEY GARRISON, SR.," Handbook of Texas Online, accessed August 08, 2012. Published by the Texas State Historical Association.

U.S. House of Representatives
Preceded by Morgan G. Sanders	Member of the U.S. House of Representatives from Texas's 3rd congressional district 1939–1953	Succeeded by Brady P. Gentry
Preceded by Brady P. Gentry	Member of the U.S. House of Representatives from Texas's 3rd congressional district 1957–1967	Succeeded by Joe R. Pool
Legal offices
Preceded by David John Wilson	Judge of the United States Customs Court; 1967–1968	Succeeded by Edward D. Re
