= James Young (Texas politician) =

American politician and lawyer (1866–1942)

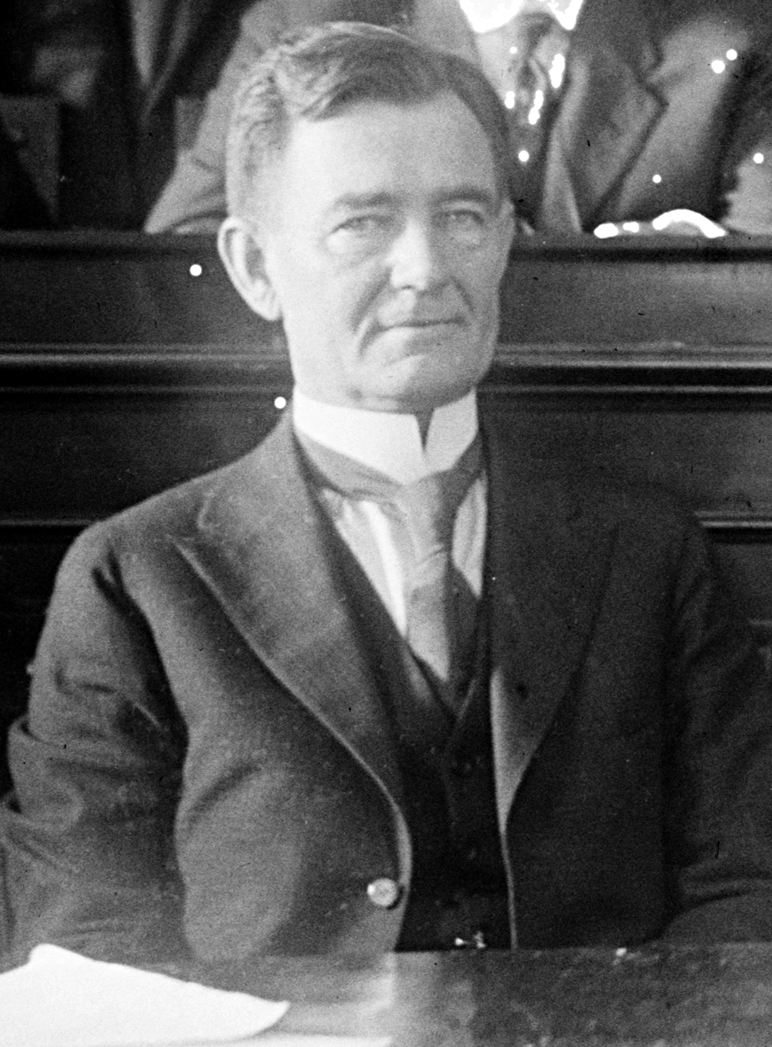
- Young in 1920

Member of the U.S. House of Representatives from Texas's 3rd district
- In office March 4, 1911 – March 3, 1921
- Preceded by: Robert M. Lively
- Succeeded by: Morgan G. Sanders

Personal details
- Born: James Young; July 18, 1866 Henderson, Texas, US
- Died: April 29, 1942 (aged 75) Dallas, Texas, US
- Party: Democratic
- Education: University of Texas at Austin School of Law
- Occupation: Politician, lawyer

James Young (July 18, 1866 – April 29, 1942) was an American politician and lawyer. A Democrat, he was a member of the United States House of Representatives from Texas.

== Biography ==
Young was born on July 18, 1866, on a farm near Henderson, Texas. He had five siblings. In July 1891, he graduated from the University of Texas at Austin School of Law. The same year, he was admitted to the bar, after which he began practicing in Kaufman. He also operated a farm. He married Allie Nash, with whom he had two children.

Young was a Democrat. He was a member of the United States House of Representatives, from March 4, 1911, to March 3, 1921, representing Texas's 3rd district. While serving, he was a member of the Committee on Agriculture, as which he fought against the price fixing of cotton and against the quarantining of Texas cotton, which was infested with fink bollworm at the time.

Young declined running in the following election. He was an unsuccessful candidate in the 1930 Texas gubernatorial election. He lost the Democratic primary to Ross S. Sterling and ran as an independent, receiving 73,385 votes. Ideologically, he was liberal. He supported Prohibition. He opposed income tax, instead favoring taxes on companies; he ran on the promise of such in his gubernatorial campaign.

After serving in Congress, Young returned to practicing law in Kaufman. In 1931, he moved back to Henderson. He retired in 1937, subsequently moving to Dallas. He was Christian and described as "unbigoted". He died on April 29, 1942, aged 75, in Dallas, and was buried at Kaufman Cemetery.

U.S. House of Representatives
Preceded by Robert M. Lively	Member of the U.S. House of Representatives from Texas's 3rd congressional district 1911-1921	Succeeded by Morgan G. Sanders
