= Texas's 3rd congressional district =

U.S. House district for Texas

Coordinates: 33°09′34″N 96°36′48″W

- Interactive map of district boundaries
- Representative: Keith Self; R–McKinney
- Distribution: 96.88% urban; 3.12% rural
- Population (2025): 954,803
- Median household income: $122,503
- Ethnicity: 56.0% White; 16.2% Hispanic; 13.0% Asian; 9.4% Black; 4.6% Two or more races; 0.9% other
- Cook PVI: R+10

Texas's 3rd congressional district is a United States House of Representatives district in suburban and some rural areas north and northeast of Dallas. It encompasses much of Collin County, namely McKinney and Allen, as well as parts of Plano, Frisco, and Prosper. Additionally, the district includes all but the southern portion of Hunt County. The district is also home to a public four-year university, East Texas A&M University, as well as most of the Collin College campuses.

Texas has had at least three congressional districts since 1869. The current seat dates from a mid-decade redistricting conducted before the 1966 elections after the case Wesberry v. Sanders voided Texas's original, pre-1960s map. In past configurations, it has been one of the most Republican districts in both Texas and the Dallas–Fort Worth metroplex. The GOP has held the seat since a 1968 special election; the district's current congressman is Keith Self.

As of the 2010 census, the 3rd district represents 765,486 people who are predominantly middle-to-upper-class (median family income is US$80,912). The district is 59.1 percent non-Hispanic White, 15.06 percent Hispanic or Latino (of any race), 13 percent Asian, and 8.9 percent Black or African American.

From 1967 to 2013, the 3rd district included large portions of Dallas County. Eventually, it covered much of northern Dallas County, including Garland, Rowlett, and much of northern Dallas itself before it pushed into Collin County in 1983. Since then, Collin County's rapid growth resulted in the district's share of Dallas County being gradually reduced. After redistricting in 2012, the Dallas County portion of the district was removed altogether. However, it still included the Dallas precincts located in Collin County.

== 2021 redistricting ==
From 2013 to 2021, the district represented suburban areas north and northeast of Dallas. It encompassed much of Collin County, including McKinney, Plano, and the majority of Frisco, as well as a portion of the city of Dallas. The district was also home to the public Collin College, and the Frisco campus of the University of North Texas.

After redistricting in 2021, the Dallas and Richardson portions of the district were removed, as well as much of Plano and Frisco. The Richardson portion of the district was transferred to District 32, while the Plano, Dallas, and Frisco portions went to District 4. In return, District 3 was expanded eastward to encompass most of Hunt County.

== Recent election results from statewide races ==
=== 2023–2027 boundaries ===
| Year | Office | Results |
|---|---|---|
| 2008 | President | McCain 66% - 34% |
| 2012 | President | Romney 69% - 31% |
| 2014 | Senate | Cornyn 74% - 26% |
| 2014 | Governor | Abbott 70% - 30% |
| 2016 | President | Trump 60% - 34% |
| 2018 | Senate | Cruz 57% - 42% |
| 2018 | Governor | Abbott 63% - 35% |
| 2018 | Lt. Governor | Patrick 59% - 39% |
| 2018 | Attorney General | Paxton 57% - 40% |
| 2018 | Comptroller of Public Accounts | Hegar 61% - 36% |
| 2020 | President | Trump 56% - 42% |
| 2020 | Senate | Cornyn 59% - 38% |
| 2022 | Governor | Abbott 59% - 39% |
| 2022 | Lt. Governor | Patrick 58% - 40% |
| 2022 | Attorney General | Paxton 57% - 39% |
| 2022 | Comptroller of Public Accounts | Hegar 62% - 36% |
| 2024 | President | Trump 59% - 39% |
| 2024 | Senate | Cruz 56% - 42% |

=== 2027–2033 boundaries ===
| Year | Office | Results |
|---|---|---|
| 2008 | President | McCain 65% - 34% |
| 2012 | President | Romney 69% - 31% |
| 2014 | Senate | Cornyn 74% - 26% |
| 2014 | Governor | Abbott 70% - 30% |
| 2016 | President | Trump 61% - 33% |
| 2018 | Senate | Cruz 59% - 40% |
| 2018 | Governor | Abbott 64% - 34% |
| 2018 | Lt. Governor | Patrick 59% - 38% |
| 2018 | Attorney General | Paxton 59% - 39% |
| 2018 | Comptroller of Public Accounts | Hegar 62% - 35% |
| 2020 | President | Trump 58% - 40% |
| 2020 | Senate | Cornyn 60% - 37% |
| 2022 | Governor | Abbott 61% - 38% |
| 2022 | Lt. Governor | Patrick 60% - 38% |
| 2022 | Attorney General | Paxton 59% - 37% |
| 2022 | Comptroller of Public Accounts | Hegar 63% - 35% |
| 2024 | President | Trump 60% - 37% |
| 2024 | Senate | Cruz 58% - 40% |
| 2026 | Senate | Talarico 49% - 48% |
| 2026 | Governor | Abbott 52% - 47% |

== Current composition ==
For the 118th and successive Congresses (based on redistricting following the 2020 census), the district contains all or portions of the following counties and communities:

Collin County (30)

Allen, Anna, Blue Ridge, Celina (part; also 4th and 26th), Dallas (part; also 4th, 5th, 6th, 24th, 30th, 32nd, and 33rd; shared with Dallas, Denton, Kaufman, and Rockwall counties), Fairview, Farmersville, Frisco (part; also 4th and 26th; shared with Denton County), Josephine (shared with Hunt County), Lavon, Lowry Crossing, Lucas, McKinney (part; also 4th), Melissa, Murphy, Nevada, New Hope, Parker, Plano (part; also 4th, 26th, and 32nd; shared with Denton County), Princeton, Prosper (part; also 4th and 26th, shared with Denton County), Royse City (part; also 4th; shared with Hunt and Rockwall counties), Sachse (part; also 5th; shared with Dallas County), Seis Lagos, St. Paul, Trenton (part; also 4th; shared with Fannin County), Van Alstyne (part; also 4th; shared with Grayson County), Westminster, Weston, Wylie (part; also 5th; shared with Dallas County)

Hunt County (12)

Caddo Mills, Campbell, Celeste, Commerce, Greenville, Josephine (shared with Collin County), Lone Oak, Neylandville, Quinlan (part; also 4th), Royse City (part; also 4th; shared with Collin and Rockwall counties), Union Valley, Wolfe City

== Future composition ==
Beginning with the 2026 election, the 3rd district will consist of the following counties:

- Collin (part)
- Delta
- Franklin
- Hopkins
- Hunt (part)
- Morris
- Titus

== List of members representing the district ==
| Name | Party | Years | Cong ress | Electoral history | Counties represented |
|---|---|---|---|---|---|
District established March 4, 1863
| District inactive | | March 4, 1863 – March 31, 1870 | 38th 39th 40th 41st | Civil War and Reconstruction | |
| William Thomas Clark (Galveston) | Republican | March 31, 1870 – May 13, 1872 | 41st 42nd | Elected in 1869. Lost election contest. | [data missing] |
| Dewitt Clinton Giddings (Brenham) | Democratic | May 13, 1872 – March 3, 1875 | 42nd 43rd | Won election contest. Re-elected in 1872. [data missing] | [data missing] |
| James W. Throckmorton (McKinney) | Democratic | March 4, 1875 – March 3, 1879 | 44th 45th | Elected in 1874. Re-elected in 1876. [data missing] | [data missing] |
| Olin Wellborn (Dallas) | Democratic | March 4, 1879 – March 3, 1883 | 46th 47th | Elected in 1878. Re-elected in 1880. Redistricted to the 6th district. | [data missing] |
| James H. Jones (Henderson) | Democratic | March 4, 1883 – March 3, 1887 | 48th 49th | Elected in 1882. Re-elected in 1884. [data missing] | [data missing] |
| Constantine B. Kilgore (Wills Point) | Democratic | March 4, 1887 – March 3, 1895 | 50th 51st 52nd 53rd | Elected in 1886. Re-elected in 1888. Re-elected in 1890. Re-elected in 1892. [data missing] | [data missing] |
| Charles H. Yoakum (Greenville) | Democratic | March 4, 1895 – March 3, 1897 | 54th | Elected in 1894. [data missing] | [data missing] |
| Reese C. De Graffenreid (Longview) | Democratic | March 4, 1897 – August 29, 1902 | 55th 56th 57th | Elected in 1896. Re-elected in 1898. Re-elected in 1900. Died. | [data missing] |
| Vacant | | August 29, 1902 – November 4, 1902 | 57th | | |
| Gordon J. Russell (Tyler) | Democratic | November 4, 1902 – June 14, 1910 | 57th 58th 59th 60th 61st | Elected to finish Graffenreid's term. Re-elected in 1902. Re-elected in 1904. Re-elected in 1906. Re-elected in 1908. Resigned to become U.S. District Judge. | [data missing] |
| Vacant | | June 14, 1910 – July 23, 1910 | 61st | | |
| Robert M. Lively (Canton) | Democratic | July 23, 1910 – March 3, 1911 | 61st | Elected to finish Russell's term. [data missing] | [data missing] |
| James Young (Kaufman) | Democratic | March 4, 1911 – March 3, 1921 | 62nd 63rd 64th 65th 66th | Elected in 1910. Re-elected in 1912. Re-elected in 1914. Re-elected in 1916. Re-elected in 1918. [data missing] | [data missing] |
| Morgan G. Sanders (Canton) | Democratic | March 4, 1921 – January 3, 1939 | 67th 68th 69th 70th 71st 72nd 73rd 74th 75th | Elected in 1920. Re-elected in 1922. Re-elected in 1924. Re-elected in 1926. Re-elected in 1928. Re-elected in 1930. Re-elected in 1932. Re-elected in 1934. Re-elected in 1936. [data missing] | [data missing] |
| Lindley Beckworth (Gladewater) | Democratic | January 3, 1939 – January 3, 1953 | 76th 77th 78th 79th 80th 81st 82nd | Elected in 1938. Re-elected in 1940. Re-elected in 1942. Re-elected in 1944. Re-elected in 1946. Re-elected in 1948. Re-elected in 1950. Retired to run for U.S. Senator. | [data missing] |
| Brady Preston Gentry (Tyler) | Democratic | January 3, 1953 – January 3, 1957 | 83rd 84th | Elected in 1952. Re-elected in 1954. Retired. | [data missing] |
| Lindley Beckworth (Gladewater) | Democratic | January 3, 1957 – January 3, 1967 | 85th 86th 87th 88th 89th | Elected in 1956. Re-elected in 1958. Re-elected in 1960. Re-elected in 1962. Re-elected in 1964. Redistricted to the 4th district and lost renomination. | [data missing] |
| Joe Pool (Dallas) | Democratic | January 3, 1967 – July 14, 1968 | 90th | Redistricted from the at-large seat and re-elected in 1966. Died. | Dallas (part) |
| Vacant | | July 14, 1968 – August 24, 1968 | 90th | | Dallas (part) |
| James M. Collins (Dallas) | Republican | August 24, 1968 – January 3, 1983 | 90th 91st 92nd 93rd 94th 95th 96th 97th | Elected to finish Pool's term. Re-elected in 1968. Re-elected in 1970. Re-elected in 1972. Re-elected in 1974. Re-elected in 1976. Re-elected in 1978. Re-elected in 1980. Retired to run for U.S. Senator. | Dallas (part) |
| James M. Collins (Dallas) | Republican | August 24, 1968 – January 3, 1983 | 90th 91st 92nd 93rd 94th 95th 96th 97th | Elected to finish Pool's term. Re-elected in 1968. Re-elected in 1970. Re-elected in 1972. Re-elected in 1974. Re-elected in 1976. Re-elected in 1978. Re-elected in 1980. Retired to run for U.S. Senator. | Collin (part), Dallas (part), Denton (part) |
| Steve Bartlett (Dallas) | Republican | January 3, 1983 – March 11, 1991 | 98th 99th 100th 101st 102nd | Elected in 1982. Re-elected in 1984. Re-elected in 1986. Re-elected in 1988. Re-elected in 1990. Resigned to become Mayor of Dallas. | Collin (part), Dallas (part) |
| Vacant | | March 11, 1991 – May 8, 1991 | 102nd | | Collin (part), Dallas (part) |
| Sam Johnson (Plano) | Republican | May 8, 1991 – January 3, 2019 | 102nd 103rd 104th 105th 106th 107th 108th 109th 110th 111th 112th 113th 114th 115th | Elected to finish Bartlett's term. Re-elected in 1992. Re-elected in 1994. Re-elected in 1996. Re-elected in 1998. Re-elected in 2000. Re-elected in 2002. Re-elected in 2004. Re-elected in 2006. Re-elected in 2008. Re-elected in 2010. Re-elected in 2012. Re-elected in 2014. Re-elected in 2016. Retired. | Collin (part), Dallas (part) |
| Sam Johnson (Plano) | Republican | May 8, 1991 – January 3, 2019 | 102nd 103rd 104th 105th 106th 107th 108th 109th 110th 111th 112th 113th 114th 115th | Elected to finish Bartlett's term. Re-elected in 1992. Re-elected in 1994. Re-elected in 1996. Re-elected in 1998. Re-elected in 2000. Re-elected in 2002. Re-elected in 2004. Re-elected in 2006. Re-elected in 2008. Re-elected in 2010. Re-elected in 2012. Re-elected in 2014. Re-elected in 2016. Retired. | 2007–2013 Collin (part), Dallas (part) |
| Sam Johnson (Plano) | Republican | May 8, 1991 – January 3, 2019 | 102nd 103rd 104th 105th 106th 107th 108th 109th 110th 111th 112th 113th 114th 115th | Elected to finish Bartlett's term. Re-elected in 1992. Re-elected in 1994. Re-elected in 1996. Re-elected in 1998. Re-elected in 2000. Re-elected in 2002. Re-elected in 2004. Re-elected in 2006. Re-elected in 2008. Re-elected in 2010. Re-elected in 2012. Re-elected in 2014. Re-elected in 2016. Retired. | 2013–2023 Collin (part) |
| Van Taylor (Plano) | Republican | January 3, 2019 – January 3, 2023 | 116th 117th | Elected in 2018. Re-elected in 2020. Withdrew. | 2013–2023 Collin (part) |
| Keith Self (McKinney) | Republican | January 3, 2023 – present | 118th 119th | Elected in 2022. Re-elected in 2024. Re-elected in 2026. | 2023–present Collin (part), Hunt (part) |

== Recent election results ==
=== 2004 ===
US House election, 2004: Texas's 3rd District
| Party | Candidate | Votes | % |
|---|---|---|---|
| Republican | Sam Johnson (incumbent) | 178,099 | 85.56 |
| Independent | Paul Jenkins | 16,850 | 8.10 |
| Libertarian | James Vessels | 13,204 | 6.34 |
| Total votes | | 208,153 | 100.0 |
| Republican hold | | | |

=== 2006 ===
US House election, 2006: Texas District 3
| Party | Candidate | Votes | % | ±% |
|---|---|---|---|---|
| Republican | Sam Johnson (incumbent) | 88,634 | 62.52 | −23.04 |
| Democratic | Dan Dodd | 49,488 | 34.91 | +34.91 |
| Libertarian | Christopher Claytor | 3,656 | 2.58 | |
| Majority | | 39,146 | 27.61 | |
| Turnout | | 141,778 | | |
| Republican hold | | Swing | -23.04 | |

=== 2008 ===
US House election, 2008: Texas District 3
| Party | Candidate | Votes | % | ±% |
|---|---|---|---|---|
| Republican | Sam Johnson (incumbent) | 169,557 | 59.80 | −2.72 |
| Democratic | Tom Daley | 107,679 | 37.98 | +3.07 |
| Libertarian | Christopher Claytor | 6,300 | 2.22 | −0.36 |
| Majority | | | | |
| Turnout | | 283,536 | | |
| Republican hold | | Swing | -2.72 | |

=== 2010 ===
US House election, 2010: Texas District 3
| Party | Candidate | Votes | % | ±% |
|---|---|---|---|---|
| Republican | Sam Johnson (incumbent) | 101,180 | 66.28 | +6.48 |
| Democratic | John Lingenfelder | 47,848 | 31.34 | −3.57 |
| Libertarian | Christopher Claytor | 3,602 | 2.35 | +0.13 |
| Independent | Harry Pierce | 22 | 0.01 | |
| Majority | | | | |
| Turnout | | 152,652 | | |
| Republican hold | | Swing | +6.48 | |

=== 2012 ===
US House election, 2012: Texas's 3rd District
| Party | Candidate | Votes | % |
|---|---|---|---|
| Republican | Sam Johnson (incumbent) | 187,180 | 100.0 |
| Total votes | | 187,180 | 100.0 |
| Republican hold | | | |

=== 2014 ===
US House election, 2014: Texas's 3rd District
| Party | Candidate | Votes | % |
|---|---|---|---|
| Republican | Sam Johnson (incumbent) | 113,404 | 82.0 |
| Green | Paul Blair | 24,876 | 18.0 |
| Total votes | | 138,280 | 100.0 |
| Republican hold | | | |

=== 2016 ===
Adam P. Bell was the first Democrat to run for Texas's 3rd since the redistricting effort of 2012.

US House election, 2016: Texas's 3rd District
| Party | Candidate | Votes | % |
|---|---|---|---|
| Republican | Sam Johnson (incumbent) | 193,684 | 61.2 |
| Democratic | Adam P. Bell | 109,420 | 34.6 |
| Libertarian | Scott Jameson | 10,448 | 3.3 |
| Green | Paul Blair | 2,915 | 0.9 |
| Total votes | | 316,467 | 100.0 |
| Republican hold | | | |

=== 2018 ===
The incumbent representative, Sam Johnson, decided not to run for reelection in 2018, after having represented Texas's 3rd since 1991. His stated reason for retiring was that "the Lord has made clear that the season of my life in Congress is coming to an end".

US House election, 2018: Texas's 3rd District
| Party | Candidate | Votes | % |
|---|---|---|---|
| Republican | Van Taylor | 169,520 | 54.2 |
| Democratic | Lorie Burch | 138,234 | 44.2 |
| Libertarian | Christopher Claytor | 4,604 | 1.5 |
| Independent | Jeff Simons (write-in) | 153 | 0.1 |
| Total votes | | 312,511 | 100.0 |
| Republican hold | | | |

=== 2020 ===
2020 United States House of Representatives elections in Texas: Texas's 3rd District
| Party | Candidate | Votes | % |
|---|---|---|---|
| Republican | Van Taylor (incumbent) | 228,648 | 55.2 |
| Democratic | Lulu Seikaly | 177,221 | 42.8 |
| Libertarian | Christopher J. Claytor | 8,567 | 2.0 |
| Total votes | | 414,436 | 100.0 |
| Republican hold | | | |

=== 2022 ===
2022 United States House of Representatives elections in Texas: Texas's 3rd District
| Party | Candidate | Votes | % |
|---|---|---|---|
| Republican | Keith Self | 164,240 | 60.5 |
| Democratic | Sandeep Srivastava | 100,121 | 36.9 |
| Libertarian | Christopher Claytor | 6,895 | 2.5 |
| Total votes | | 271,256 | 100.0 |
| Republican hold | | | |

=== 2024 ===
2024 United States House of Representatives elections in Texas: Texas's 3rd District
| Party | Candidate | Votes | % |
|---|---|---|---|
| Republican | Keith Self (incumbent) | 237,794 | 62.5 |
| Democratic | Sandeep Srivastava | 142,953 | 37.5 |
| Total votes | | 380,747 | 100.0 |
| Republican hold | | | |

== See also ==
- List of United States congressional districts
