= Robert M. Lively =

American politician and lawyer (1855–1929)

Member of the U.S. House of Representatives from Texas's 3rd district
- In office July 23, 1910 – March 3, 1911
- Preceded by: Gordon J. Russell
- Succeeded by: James Young

Personal details
- Born: Robert Maclin Lively; January 6, 1855 Fayetteville, Arkansas, U.S.
- Died: January 15, 1929 (aged 74) Canton, Texas, U.S.
- Resting place: Canton Cemetery, Canton, Texas, U.S.
- Party: Democratic
- Profession: Politician, lawyer

Robert Maclin Lively (January 6, 1855 – January 15, 1929) was an American politician and lawyer. A Democrat, he was a member of the United States House of Representatives from Texas.

== Biography ==
Lively was born on January 6, 1855, in Fayetteville, Arkansas, the son of Lewis Preston Lively and Amanda Elizabeth (née Erwin) Lively. In 1864, he and his parents moved to Smith County, Texas. Educated at private schools, he read law under George D. Marion and Z. T. Adams, and in 1876, was admitted to the bar.

Lively began practicing law in Wills Point, later at Kaufman then Canton. From 1882 to 1884, he was prosecutor of Van Zandt County. In 1910, he was the judge of Van Zandt County.

Lively was a Democrat. Following the resignation of Gordon J. Russell, he was elected to the United States House of Representatives, representing Texas's 3rd district from July 23, 1910, to March 3, 1911. He refused nomination in the following election. Ideologically, he was liberal.

From 1916 to 1918, Lively was the judge of Van Zandt County. On November 24, 1878, he married to Julia Cannon, with whom he had four children. He was a member of the Methodist Episcopal Church, South. He died on January 15, 1929, agd 74, in Canton, and was buried at Canton Cemetery. As of 1988, an archive of his papers is unavailable.

U.S. House of Representatives
Preceded by Gordon J. Russell	Member of the U.S. House of Representatives from Texas's 3rd congressional district July 23, 1910 – March 3, 1911	Succeeded by James Young
