= 1948 United States Senate election in Texas =

- November 2, 1948
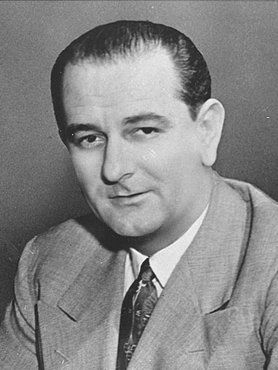

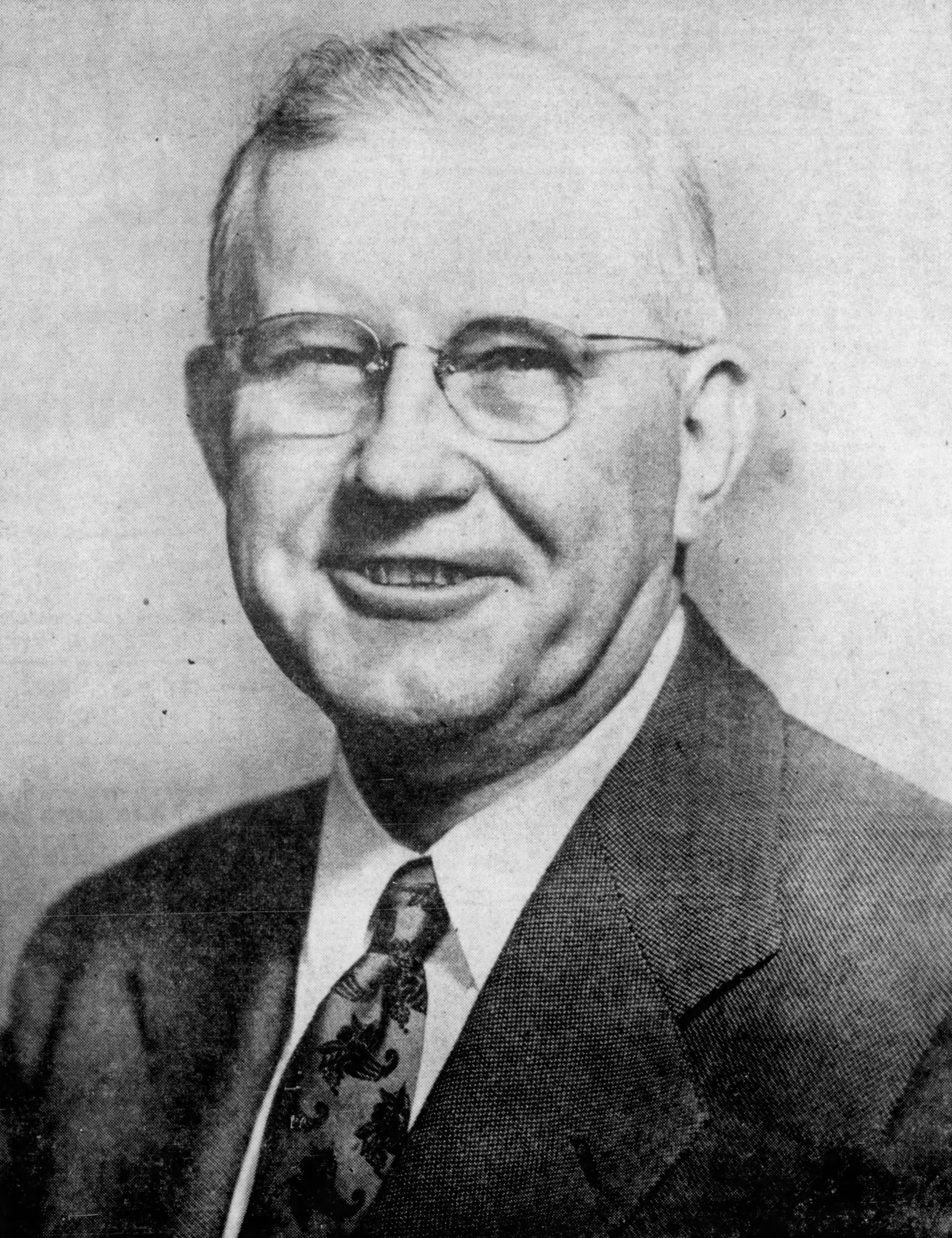
| Nominee | Lyndon B. Johnson | Jack Porter |
| Party | Democratic | Republican |
| Popular vote | 702,985 | 349,665 |
| Percentage | 66.22% | 32.94% |
- County results Johnson: 50–60% 60–70% 70–80% 80–90% >90% Porter: 40–50% 50–60% 60–70% 70–80% 80–90%
U.S. senator before election
W. Lee O'Daniel
Democratic
Elected U.S. Senator
Lyndon B. Johnson
Democratic

The 1948 United States Senate election in Texas was held on November 2, 1948. Democratic U.S. representative and future president of the United States Lyndon B. Johnson was elected in an open race to succeed retiring Democratic incumbent W. Lee O'Daniel. Johnson won the Democratic primary over Texas governor Coke R. Stevenson in one of the narrowest and most controversial elections in United States history.

The Democratic primary was held on July 24. Because no candidate received a majority of the vote, Johnson and Stevenson advanced to a run-off election on August 28 to determine the winner. In an era in which the Democratic nomination was considered tantamount to election, the run-off was sharply contested between the liberal Johnson and the more conservative Stevenson. Johnson was officially declared the winner by 87 votes; after a series of legal challenges by the Stevenson campaign and recount efforts, the Texas Democratic Party state committee confirmed Johnson's nomination by a margin of one vote.

The Democratic primary and run-off were marred by accusations of bribery and electoral fraud, in Jim Wells County in particular, which have been corroborated by Johnson biographers including Robert Caro. In Means of Ascent, Caro argues that Johnson's victory was "brazen thievery." The most famous allegation concerns the Box 13 scandal, wherein 202 votes were added to the results for a single precinct in Jim Wells six days after the election, giving Johnson a narrow lead. The case reached the Supreme Court of the United States, where it was denied a hearing on the grounds that the state party held the final decision over party nominations. In later years, testimony by the parties involved indicated that widespread fraud had occurred.

In the general election, Johnson faced businessman and Republican Party activist Jack Porter, who waged an unusually aggressive campaign. Although Johnson won his first term in the Senate in the strongly Democratic state, he defeated Porter by a much closer margin than typical for his party during this era.

== Background ==
Like other Southern states between Reconstruction and the 1960s, Texas was a one-party state, with the white population solidly voting Democratic as a legacy of the American Civil War and the Reconstruction era. Disputes within the Texas Democratic Party were far more important than disputes between Democrats and Republicans. Starting with the 1944 election, the Democratic Party had been split between the Texas Loyalists, who supported Franklin D. Roosevelt and Harry S. Truman, and the Texas Regulars, who opposed them. Though the Texas Regulars had officially disbanded after the 1944 election, the split remained. Stevenson had supported the Texas Regulars in 1944, and in 1948 flirted with supporting the Dixiecrat presidential candidacy of South Carolina Governor Strom Thurmond. Johnson had been a Roosevelt supporter and was a member of the Texas Loyalist faction. The acrimonious split in Texas Democrats ensured an unusually bitter primary battle between Johnson and Stevenson.

=== Politics in "the Valley" ===
The area around the Rio Grande valley was popularly known in Texas as "the Valley." In a political sense, the Valley also included several counties to the north. Most of the people in the Valley were Chicanos (Mexican Americans), and the region was often described as feeling more like Mexico than the United States since Spanish was more widely spoken than English, the culture was predominantly Mexican, and most houses were built in the same style as those found just across the border in Mexico. The Valley had the lowest literacy rate in the entire United States, with most of its people being unable to read and write in Spanish, let alone English. The dominant element in the Valley were Anglos (meaning white Texans since in Texas, the term did not necessarily imply English ancestry), who tended to be ranch owners. Most Mexican Americans continued the custom originating in Mexico of accepting leadership from a patrón ("patron") or jefe ("boss"). The Valley was characterized by a feudal political culture in which the Mexican-American tenant farmers and ranch workers were like serfs, and the "bosses" were like feudal barons. In Texas, voting required paying a poll tax. It was common for the wealthy patrones to pay the tax for the Mexican Americans and to order them to vote for the candidate supported by the bosses. The most noteworthy aspect of the Valley's political culture was extensive corruption and voting fraud. To back up their rule, the jefes often appointed their pistoleros (gunmen) as deputy sheriffs who ensured that farmers and workers voted the "right" way by handing out ballots that had already been marked, which they would then place in the ballot boxes.

The most powerful of the Valley's bosses was George Berham Parr, whom the press called "the Duke of Duval." Locally, Parr was known to the Anglos as "George B" and to the Chicanos as Tacuacha ("sly possum"). Parr owned much of the land and many of the businesses in the Valley. For instance, the only company allowed to sell beer in Duval County was owned by Parr. Besides Duval County, Parr's influence extended to Jim Wells, Zapata, Webb, La Salle and Starr counties. One of Parr's pistoleros was Luis Salas, known as Indio (meaning Indian, a reference to his Tepehuán descent and dark complexion), a man from Durango, Mexico, who fled to the United States after he had killed a man in a bar brawl. Salas, a burly 6'1" (185 cm) man, known for his great physical strength, ferocious temper and love of violence, was in charge of elections in Precinct 13 in Jim Wells County. As Parr was the first Anglo to treat Salas with respect and paid him well for his services, Salas was extremely loyal.

Parr was also a friend of Johnson, as Frank B. Lloyd, the District Attorney (DA) in Alice, Texas recalled: "George and Lyndon were very close. He [Johnson] didn't make public spectacles [of trips to Alice] like some of the politicians did. But there was the telephone." When Johnson first ran for the Senate in 1941, he paid a large sum of money to Parr to obtain the Valley vote. Parr had supported Stevenson during his runs for governor, but in 1944, the two fell out. The commander of an Army Air Forces (AAF) training base in Laredo complained to Stevenson that half his men had been infected with venereal diseases after they visited brothels owned by Parr. AAF leaders asked that the governor appoint an honest district attorney who would crack down on prostitution. Over the objections of Parr, who favored a family friend for the appointment, Stevenson selected one who pursued prostitution-related cases, and Parr never forgave Stevenson. As a congressman, Johnson had long lobbied for a presidential pardon for Parr, who had been convicted of tax evasion in 1932. In February 1946, the newly appointed United States Attorney General, Texan Tom C. Clark, recommended a pardon to President Truman, who granted it on 20 February. Parr believed that Johnson's lobbying had ensured his pardon, which cemented their friendship.

=== 1941 special election ===
In Texas elections, the general rule was "The lead in the runoff always wins." In Texas Democratic primaries, which were overseen by the party, not the state government, major candidates would "hold out" by delaying reporting their final tallies so they could add additional votes if needed. That practice favored the side that initially led the runoff because it was difficult for the other side to add enough votes to win without sparking plausible accusations of fraud. One of the few exceptions to that rule was the 1941 special election for Senate. Johnson was a candidate to fill the vacancy created by the death of Morris Sheppard. Governor W. Lee O'Daniel intended to run for the seat and appointed the elderly and infirm Andrew Jackson Houston, son of Sam Houston, as a placeholder. (Houston was in such poor physical condition that the trip to Washington to assume his duties taxed his health, and he died immediately before the special election.) On election day, Saturday, June 28, 1941, O'Daniel and Johnson were the top two finishers. That night, Johnson was ahead by 5,000 votes with 96% of the votes counted. Johnson was declared the winner, congratulations poured in from supporters in Washington, and his campaign staff and volunteers celebrated into the night. In the following days, vote totals shifted until O'Daniel took the lead, and Johnson lost by 1,311 votes. The new totals were announced the Tuesday morning after the election, so late that it was considered shocking. The final result was O'Daniel 175,590 votes (30.49%) and Johnson 174,279 (30.26%).

John Connally believed the O'Daniel campaign waited until Johnson's vote totals were announced so that they knew what they had to beat and then added enough fraudulent votes to his total from areas with the polls controlled by O'Daniel loyalists to give O'Daniel his narrow victory.

As a result of that experience, Johnson prepared for a close runoff by arranging in 1948 for his supporters who controlled votes, including Parr, to withhold their final tallies until the statewide results were announced. By waiting until the statewide result was in, Johnson would know the figure he had to surpass and so could add as many votes as necessary to his total.

In 1946, Edgar Shelton Jr., a son of George Parr's lawyer who was acquainted with Parr's associates, wrote in his University of Texas master's degree thesis about the possibility of election fraud in Texas runoffs:

"What if we had two men running for an important office such as Senator or Governor, one of them being popular but dishonest, and the other being popular and honest. Assume that the dishonest man had secured a pledge of support from the bosses of the Valley, as he probably would. If the race were close, and the honest man was ahead by only a few thousand votes with all of the returns in except from the Valley... the election could easily be 'stolen' by having the Valley counties send in just enough votes to put the dishonest man in office. Thus the will of the people of the State would be denied by less than a dozen men, all political feudal lords of the Valley."

Shelton wrote that as of 1946, "This has probably not yet happened."

== Democratic primary ==
=== Candidates ===
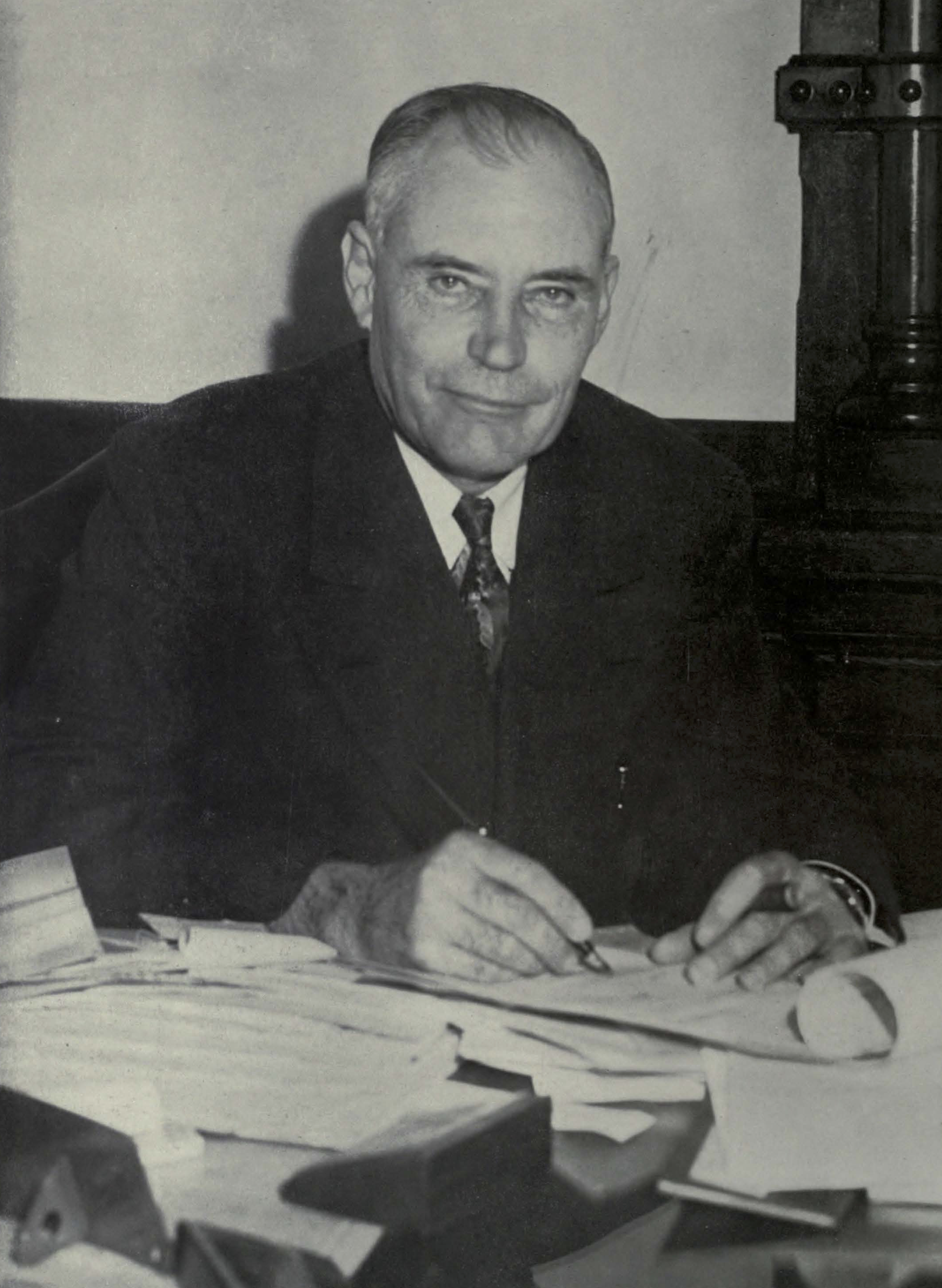
Coke R. Stevenson

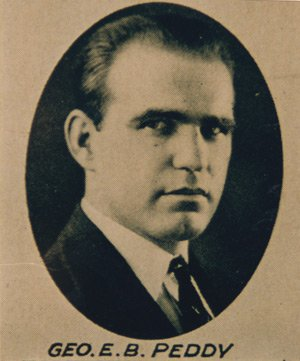
George E. B. Peddy

- Jim Alford
- F.B. Clark
- Roscoe Collier
- Frank G. Cortez
- Arlon Barton "Cyclone" Davis, perennial candidate and son of former Congressman James Davis
- Lyndon B. Johnson, six-term U.S. Representative from Texas's 10th congressional district (since 1937)
- Otis Myers
- George Peddy, former State Representative, attorney, and candidate for U.S. Senate in 1922
- Jesse Saunders
- Terrell Sledge, candidate for U.S. Senate in 1946
- Coke R. Stevenson, former Governor of Texas (1941–1947)

=== Campaign ===
Lady Bird Johnson Home Movie - LBJ's 1948 Senate Campaign

Johnson in the S-51 helicopter

Stevenson, Johnson, and Peddy were widely regarded as the front runners. On May 16, 1948, a poll showed Stevenson ahead of Johnson 64% to 28%. On 13 June 1948, the Austin American-Statesman spoke of "a withering lack enthusiasm" on the part of voters for the election. On June 20, the same poll showed Stevenson with 47% and Johnson with 37%.

In mid-June 1948, Johnson's campaign was able to get access to a Sikorsky S-51 helicopter (flown by a test pilot who had never flown in a helicopter before), a first for Texas political campaigns. It was suggested to Johnson that he fly around in a helicopter owing to the size of Texas, and because many Texans lived in small towns where the roads were usually just mud tracks. Johnson's campaign dubbed the aircraft the "Johnson City Windmill". Johnson made campaign appearances around Texas six days a week from dawn to dusk and the spectacle drew large crowds to fairgrounds and other impromptu landing sites. At the time, helicopters were a recent invention and most people in Texas had never seen one, making the aircraft an instant draw. One newspaper spoke of Johnson "flitting around in a strange sort of flying machine" that had never been seen in Texas before. Attached to the helicopter was a giant loudspeaker, which allowed Johnson to announce to farmers working their fields as he hovered above them: "Hello, down there! This is your friend, Lyndon Johnson, your candidate for the United States Senate. I hope you'll vote for me on Primary day. And bring along your relatives to vote, too". As Johnson campaigned in the Rio Grande valley, one journalist wrote: "Johnson brought people rushing out of their homes and places of business as he circled cities in the thickly populated valley, waving his hat and urging people to come and see him".

"Johnson used to pitch his hat out of the helicopter, you know. We'd go over the crowd several times, in fact, this would bring the people in. As we got very low coming in, he would pitch his hat out, and some little kid would grab it and come running up with it later, and he'd give them a dollar for the hat." - James Chudars, helicopter pilot

In early July the S-51 was returned for required maintenance and the campaign switched to a smaller Bell 47D for the remainder of the campaign.

As governor, Stevenson had increased taxes on the oil companies, which he used to improve the education system and increase pensions, making him very popular with Texas voters. The Texas chapter of the American Federation of Labor endorsed Stevenson, which he did not repudiate. Unions were unpopular in the rural areas of Texas, where they were associated with corruption, with urbanization and with ethnic groups, the so-called "hyphenated Americans", who were not seen as proper Americans. Though Johnson had sometimes billed himself as an idealistic New Deal liberal, as a Congressman representing a district in Texas, a very conservative Southern state, he had consistently voted against union-friendly legislation, causing the Federation of Labor to endorse Stevenson out of frustration with Johnson. Johnson seized upon the endorsement to claim there was a "secret deal", maintaining "Labor leaders made a secret agreement with Calculating Coke [Johnson's term of abuse for Stevenson] that they couldn't get out of me". Johnson accused Stevenson of having to promise to vote to repeal the anti-union Taft–Hartley Act, which was popular in Texas. At the same time, Johnson had recordings of Stevenson's speeches that had been edited to make the conservative Stevenson sound like a downright reactionary, aired to select groups of liberals in New York, Washington and other northeastern cities to raise money to help defeat the "Neanderthal" Stevenson.

Johnson made much of his brief World War II service, proudly wearing the Silver Star he had been awarded for heroism in 1942 (which later became the subject of controversy), and ridiculed Stevenson for not having military experience. (Note: At age 10 in 1898, Stevenson was too young to have fought in the Spanish–American War. During World War I he was 30 and married, and serving as Kimble County Judge. During World War II, Stevenson was in his mid to late 50s, and serving as first lieutenant governor and then governor.) At nearly all his campaign rallies, Johnson made certain that a disabled World War II veteran was there to endorse him, which he used to enhance his "war hero" aura. One reporter who had apparently been misinformed by Johnson about his war record wrote about him: "...flying in B-29s, helping bomb one Japanese island after another into submission three years ago." In addition, Johnson warned about the "red tide of Communism", predicting the Soviet Union would have an atomic bomb by 1951 and World War III might break out in the next decade, which he used as a way of contrasting his internationalism vs. the isolationism of Stevenson. Johnson used Stevenson's isolationism to warn that electing him would make a Third World War more likely and that the war would be fought on American soil instead of in Europe. Johnson also noted that Texas had no electricity in rural areas until the New Deal, which he used as argument for electing him, because he had voted for the New Deal as a congressman and lobbied tirelessly to electrify rural Texas. The race was noted for its vitriolic tone with many personal attacks; in particular Johnson took to mimicking Stevenson's voice, pet expressions, and mannerisms in speeches that mocked Stevenson's integrity. Stevenson in turn depicted himself as a simple cowboy and accused Johnson of being financially supported by oil companies and unions.

Those who knew Johnson well at the time described him on the campaign trail as being on a sort of "high" as he displayed manic energy and restlessness. At the same time, Johnson's temper, always explosive at the best of times, was unusually fiery as one of his aides, Horace Busby recalled: "I'm talking about explosions, tirades. Especially explosions against the women who worked for him: 'Everyone in this outfit is against me!' That kind of thing". Johnson alternatively charmed or bullied the reporters covering his campaign, at one point exploding in rage at an overweight reporter, who had trouble keeping up with him, leading Johnson to mock him for his obesity. As Johnson's self-confidence grew, he became notably angry at audiences who did not cheer him as much as he wanted, alienating voters. By contrast, Stevenson's dignified behavior at the Texas Cowboy Reunion in early July, during which he led the participants' parade down the streets of Stamford on horseback, won him many cheers.

The primary election was held on Saturday, July 24, 1948. Stevenson came in first with 39.7% of the vote to Johnson's 33.7% and conservative candidate George Peddy's 19.7%.

=== Results ===
Primary results by county. Johnson counties appear in blue, Stevenson counties in green, and Peddy counties in yellow. Johnson: Johnson—>90%; Johnson—80–90%; Johnson—70–80%; Johnson—60–70%; Johnson—50–60%; Johnson—40–50%; Johnson—30–40%; Stevenson: Stevenson—30–40%; Stevenson—40–50%; Stevenson—50–60%; Stevenson—60–70%; Stevenson—70–80%; Peddy: Peddy—30–40%; Peddy—40–50%; Peddy—50–60%; Peddy—60–70%; Peddy—70–80%

Democratic primary results
| Party | Candidate | Votes | % |
|---|---|---|---|
| Democratic | Coke R. Stevenson | 477,077 | 39.68% |
| Democratic | Lyndon B. Johnson | 405,617 | 33.73% |
| Democratic | George E. B. Peddy | 237,195 | 19.73% |
| Democratic | Otis C. Myers | 15,330 | 1.28% |
| Democratic | Frank G. Cortez | 13,344 | 1.11% |
| Democratic | Roscoe H. Collier | 12,327 | 1.03% |
| Democratic | Cyclone Davis | 10,871 | 0.90% |
| Democratic | James F. Alford | 9,117 | 0.76% |
| Democratic | F. B. Clark | 7,420 | 0.62% |
| Democratic | Jesse C. Saunders | 7,401 | 0.62% |
| Democratic | Terrell Sledge | 6,692 | 0.56% |
| Total votes | | 1,202,391 | 100.00% |

== Democratic primary runoff ==
=== Campaign ===
LBJ's 1948 Senate Campaign Spots

Since no candidate received a majority of the votes, a runoff (also called 'second primary') was held between the top two finishers, Stevenson and Johnson. Because third-place finisher George Peddy was conservative, as was Stevenson, most political observers expected Stevenson would receive the support of former Peddy backers and easily win the runoff.

In an appeal to conservative voters, Johnson stated in a radio broadcast: "Lyndon Johnson voted for the anti-Communist Taft-Hartley Law. Lyndon Johnson will never vote to repeal this law. But my opponent has not yet made a public statement as to just where he stands on this measure that bans Communist control of labor unions". To hammer in the point, Johnson created a pseudo-newspaper, the Johnson Journal, that was mailed to 340,000 rural homes in August with the headline "Communists Favor Coke". In response, Stevenson accused Johnson of not doing enough for Texas despite having served as a Congressman since 1937. Aiding Johnson was the endorsement of former Governor Miriam "Ma" Ferguson, whose husband James "Pa" Ferguson had also served as governor. The Fergusons enjoyed popular support, especially among rural voters, even though Pa Ferguson had been impeached for corruption. Ma Ferguson recalled that when her husband died in 1944, Johnson attended the funeral, while Stevenson did not. She now repaid Johnson's gesture by publishing a letter urging Ferguson supporters to back Johnson.

During the runoff contest, Johnson campaigned even harder than he had for the first primary, while Stevenson's campaign flagged because Johnson's spending vastly surpassed Stevenson's. Johnson campaigned hard in East Texas counties that had been the source of most of Peddy's primary election support, and he received the endorsements of two of Peddy's brothers. On the other hand, Stevenson committed errors including appearing presumptuous by traveling to Washington to be photographed meeting with senior Truman administration officials and posing in the Senate chamber before the runoff had even taken place.

The small counties of Hansford and Kinney, which had favored Stevenson with margins of over three to one and over two to one respectively in the primary, did not hold runoffs, assuming that their vote totals would not influence the outcome. If they had participated and Stevenson had won by the same margin as he had in the primary, the votes from those counties might have enabled Stevenson to finish ahead of Johnson.

In Howard County, which had quartered an Army Air Force Bombardier School during World War II, General Ira C. Eaker, former deputy commander of the Army Air Force, came out in support of Johnson ten days before the runoff. Stevenson's campaign counterattacked, but Eaker was defended by other prominent military officers and by Johnson. Criticizing a prominent military leader so soon after World War II likely had a negative effect on Stevenson's turnout, while Howard County returned an abnormally high net gain for Johnson as compared to his gains in other areas.

In San Augustine and Shelby counties, abnormally large net vote gains for Johnson were later attributed to, "promises of contracts, loans and cash payments to individuals". Similar efforts in Gregg County by the Stevenson campaign led to gains for Stevenson and reversals for the Johnson campaign.

A week before the runoff, a poll showed Stevenson leading Johnson 48% to 41%. The day before the runoff election, a poll showed Stevenson leading Johnson 53% to 47%.

=== Election ===
The runoff election was Saturday, August 28, 1948. According to later analysis, approximately 113,000 voters who had voted for Stevenson in July did not participate in the August runoff election. In contrast, only an estimated 4,000 voters who voted for Johnson in July did not turn out in August. Stevenson received the support of 50 percent of Peddy's voters, but Johnson exceeded expectations by obtaining the votes of 20 percent of those who previously voted for Peddy. Those who did not vote in July or who had voted for minor candidates heavily supported Johnson. Johnson's efforts to win over Peddy's supporters bore fruit; though he attracted fewer overall than Stevenson, Johnson's existing supporters in the nine counties carried by Peddy in the first primary added to Johnson's new supporters among former Peddy backers enabled Johnson to carry all nine Peddy counties in the runoff.

The vote count took a week, and was handled by the Democratic State Central Committee. On August 30 at 11:45 a.m., results had been tabulated from 211 of the state's 254 counties. Stevenson's total (492,481) had surpassed Johnson's (492,271) by 210 votes. Johnson started calling his county campaign managers to reassure them that he would win, and a Johnson aide later told his biographer Robert Caro that Johnson purposely avoided asking for fraud to be committed so that he would be able to testify truthfully under oath in any post-election legal proceedings. However, Johnson did ask for his campaign managers to "find" more votes for him by reexamining the tally sheets. In the process of attempting to increase Johnson's total, one of his aides accidentally called a Stevenson campaign manager to ask him to find more votes for Johnson. One of Parr's aides stated he took a telephone call from Johnson to Parr that was about the election and the fact that the counties under Parr's control still had not reported their votes meant extra votes could be added to Johnson's total.

Three days after the polls closed, results were still being tabulated and Stevenson led by a small amount. On September 2, Stevenson was still in the lead. The election returns from Houston, Fort Worth and Dallas showed Stevenson leading by 20,000 votes, giving Stevenson enough of a lead that he celebrated his apparent victory. The election returns from Bexar County in the July primary gave Stevenson a 12,000 vote margin. In the runoff, Johnson's personal attention helped reverse the result, and the newly reported 2,000 vote margin in his favor made the contest competitive again. Early on Friday, September 3, an unusually late six days after the election, new vote tallies from Jim Wells and Duval Counties were announced, replacing previous counts and giving Johnson the lead. The election results from the Valley favored Johnson by statistically improbable amounts, with Duval County reporting 4,195 votes for Johnson and only 38 for Stevenson. In addition to lopsided totals in Jim Wells and Duval counties, Parr's influence in Jim Hogg County was estimated to have delivered Johnson over 1,000 additional votes.

Stevenson held a press conference and accused Johnson of fraud, saying "A concentrated effort is being made to count me out of this Senate race". Johnson denied any fraud, saying that the vote returns had been merely incorrectly reported and he had known of the true figures all along. Johnson's statement prompted much skepticism with the newspapers pointing out that some of the judges supervising the vote in "the Valley" were saying as late as 29 August that they had not counted all of the votes, leading to questions about how he had known of the precise number of votes since Election Day. In a subsequent radio address, Johnson claimed that he only learned of the vote totals on 31 August and challenged Stevenson to produce evidence of fraud. Stevenson sent in a team led by Mexican-American lawyer Pete Tijerina to investigate, and Tijerina interviewed several individuals who were recorded as having voted, but who stated that they had not cast ballots. Tijerina was unable to find a notary public willing to authenticate these statements, which precluded them from being presented in court. After sheriff's deputies warned Tijerina and his team to depart Duval County or local authorities would not able to guarantee their safety, Tijerina and his aides immediately left. Another team of Stevenson lawyers went to Jim Wells County and asked to see the tally sheets, but were turned away. After interviewing members of the local Democratic Executive Committee who mentioned irregularities in the tally sheets, which were by now locked in a vault at the Texas State Bank, the lawyers believed the tally sheets contained evidence of fraud.

Stevenson went to Alice, the Jim Wells County seat, accompanied by Frank Hamer, a legendary Texas Ranger and longtime friend and hunting partner, and attempted to see the tally sheets. Many feared a shootout as Stevenson and Hamer walked down the main street of Alice with their hands on their guns, but they were able to avoid a confrontation by intimidating five of Parr's pistoleros into backing down. The bank manager allowed them to briefly view the list, then took it back when he saw them making notes, but Stevenson and Hamer had seen enough to convince them that blatant fraud had taken place, particularly in the vote totals for Precinct 13. The last 200 or so names on the Precinct 13 tally sheet were in alphabetical order and written in black ink and identical handwriting that was different from the writing for other entries, which were in blue ink. Stevenson and Hamer had memorized enough of the names that they were able to contact some of the individuals, many of whom stated that they had not voted.

Stevenson sent lawyers to interview voters in Precinct 13 and collect affidavits. The claims of fraud attracted much media attention both in Texas and nationally, with Parr being profiled in Time as the man who made Johnson the next Senator from Texas. As Stevenson was a member of the Texas Regulars faction opposed to Truman, while Johnson was a member of the pro-New Deal Texas Loyalists, the Senate race had national implications, and Truman favored Johnson in the ensuing controversy.

Election Judge Luis Salas had responsibility for counting the votes in Jim Wells County. According to one observer, Jimmy Holmgreen, Salas listed votes that had been cast for Stevenson as votes for Johnson. Salas silenced complaints by ordering Holmgreen away from the table where he was counting the votes, and Holmgreen was so intimidated that he meekly complied. Salas said in 1977 that on Parr's order, he had created the last 202 fraudulent ballots from Precinct 13 (200 for Johnson, 2 for Stevenson). According to Salas, he witnessed the fraudulent votes added to the tally sheet and then certified them as authentic. "We had the law to ourselves there," Salas said. "We had iron control. If a man was opposed to us, we'd put him out of business. Parr was the Godfather. He had life or death control. We could tell any election judge: 'Give us 50 percent of the vote, the other guy 20 per cent.' We had it made in every election."

With the official statewide number of ballots reported as 988,295, Johnson was announced the winner by 87 votes. There were many allegations of voter fraud, with the greatest focus on the last 202 "patently fraudulent" Precinct 13 votes. Some of these voters insisted that they had not voted that day, while the last of the voters whose names appeared before the questionable entries on the tally sheet stated that there had been no one behind him in line shortly before the polls closed.

In his 1979 memoir, Salas wrote: "In all these years, George told me to give our candidates 80 percent of the total votes, regardless if the people voted against us". In another passage, he wrote that Parr had told him: "Luis, do not hesitate, spend all the money necessary, but we have to have Johnson elected". In Means of Ascent, Robert Caro made the case that through the machinations of Parr and Salas, Johnson stole the election in Jim Wells County.

=== Legal battle ===
At 9:50 p.m. on Friday, September 10, the Johnson team obtained an ex parte temporary restraining order to prevent a recount in Jim Wells County.

The state Democratic Party upheld Johnson. At midnight on September 13, the Democratic Party's executive committee voted to certify Johnson's nomination by a majority of one (29–28), with the last vote cast for Johnson by Temple, Texas newspaper publisher Frank W. Mayborn, whom John Connally persuaded to cut short an out-of-state business trip and return to Texas to participate in the meeting.

At 6:25 a.m. on Wednesday, September 15, Stevenson obtained a temporary restraining order from federal District Court Judge Whitfield Davidson, who was vacationing at a cabin on Caddo Lake, which prevented certification of Johnson as the party's nominee. On September 21–22, Stevenson went to court and obtained an injunction that prevented Johnson from appearing on the general election ballot. Johnson appealed, represented by his friend, future US Supreme Court Justice Abe Fortas. Fortas, an extremely adept lawyer known for his support of liberal causes, argued that a federal court had no jurisdiction over a state primary election. Associate Justice Hugo Black, sitting as a circuit court judge, ruled that jurisdiction over naming a nominee rested with the party, not the federal government. Stevenson appealed to the full United States Supreme Court, which heard arguments in early October and sustained Black's ruling on October 7, effectively ending the dispute.

=== Legacy ===
For years afterwards, the local community was "rife with rumor" concerning the events of the runoff election. Stevenson never accepted the loss. "It was very upsetting to him and he thought it was certainly not a legitimate conclusion," Frederica Wyatt, author of a Stevenson biography, said. "He was bitter about it." The Johnson camp never admitted to a stolen election. Some Johnson advisors stated that Stevenson had also committed election fraud, suggesting the reason he sought out a friendly federal judge to block Johnson's certification despite being a states' rights advocate was that close scrutiny would reveal Stevenson's own machinations. According to George Reedy, who would later serve as White House press secretary under Lyndon Johnson, "if Stevenson had really wanted an honest count of the ballots, he would have gone, as Texas law clearly provides, and made an immediate appeal to the Texas Supreme Court, and all the ballots would immediately have been impounded. Stevenson did not take that route."

In 1967, Ronnie Dugger visited with President Johnson in the White House and asked questions about Box 13.

One night, up in his bedroom, he started laughing and he seemed to wonder if he could find something and he said he was going back into Bird's bedroom, which was next door. And he rummaged around in a closet. I could almost- I think I could hear him rummaging around in the closet. And he came in with this photograph of these five guys in front of this old car with Box 13 balanced on the hood of it. I looked at him and grinned and he grinned back, but he wouldn't explain it to me. I asked him, well, who were these guys? Why did they have Box 13 on the hood of this car? What did it mean? And he just—nothing. He wouldn't say. As we'd say in Texas, he wouldn't say nothin'. So there it is—history turning on a mystery.

After Johnson's innovation of using a helicopter to campaign, other candidates followed suit. In the 1950 United States Senate election in California, Democratic nominee Helen Gahagan Douglas, who was close to Johnson, also employed one in her unsuccessful campaign against Richard Nixon.

In 1990, Robert Caro said, "People have been saying for 40 years, 'No one knows what really happened in that election,' and 'Everybody does it.' Neither of those statements is true. I don't think that this is the only election that was ever stolen, but there was never such brazen thievery." Caro said that Johnson was given the votes of "the dead, the halt, the missing and those who were unaware that an election was going on".

Runoff results by county. Johnson counties appear in blue, and Stevenson counties in green. Johnson: Johnson—>90%; Johnson—80–90%; Johnson—70–80%; Johnson—60–70%; Johnson—50–60%; Stevenson: Stevenson—50–60%; Stevenson—60–70%; Stevenson—70–80%; Stevenson—80–90%; Stevenson—>90%; No vote: No vote

=== Results ===
Democratic runoff results
| Party | Candidate | Votes | % |
|---|---|---|---|
| Democratic | Lyndon B. Johnson | 494,191 | 50.004% |
| Democratic | Coke Stevenson | 494,104 | 49.996% |
| Total votes | | 988,295 | 100.00% |

== Republican nomination ==
With Texas part of the Democratic Party's Solid South since the end of the Reconstruction era in the 1870s, the Democratic nomination for statewide office had long been considered tantamount to election. In 1940, an independent oil producer, Homa Jackson Porter, broke with the Democratic Party because of his opposition to a third term for President Franklin D. Roosevelt. In the mid-1940s, Porter created the Texas Independent Producers and Royalty Owners Association (TIPRO), a statewide organization of oil producers, of which he became president. Porter, usually known as H. J. Porter or Jack Porter, became a Republican after the 1940 election, and began a long term effort to construct a competitive Republican Party in Texas.

In 1948, Carlos G. Watson initially received the Republican nomination for U.S. Senate. Watson, a loyal Republican who had run several unsuccessful campaigns for the U.S. House and U.S. Senate as a token candidate so that Democratic nominees would not be unopposed, agreed to step aside in favor of a more viable candidate if one could be found. Sensing an opportunity to make inroads among conservative voters in the wake of both the animosity left over from the Democratic runoff and the Dixiecrat defection from the Democrats because of incumbent Democratic President Harry S. Truman's pro-civil rights stand, Republicans attempted unsuccessfully to recruit two Democrats, former Congressman Martin Dies Jr. and Senator W. Lee O'Daniel, the incumbent whose term was scheduled to expire in January 1949, to accept their nomination. Porter had already been named to head the Dewey-Warren presidential campaign in Texas, but when both Dies and O'Daniel declined, Porter agreed to make the Senate race. Watson declined the nomination in September, and the state Republican committee then selected Porter as his replacement.

Porter ran an aggressive campaign and attempted to cut into Democratic strength by appealing to conservative voters. Stevenson endorsed Porter in the general election, and Porter espoused a platform that included advocacy of states' rights, the continuation of racial segregation, militant anti-communism, and a pro-business approach to tax and economic policy. In addition, Porter argued that Johnson was corrupt and that the runoff election results were so tainted that if Johnson won the general election, the U.S. Senate might refuse to seat him, depriving Texas of half its representation. Porter also argued that with Truman supposedly sure to lose to Republican Thomas E. Dewey, a Republican U.S. Senator could be more effective than a Democrat.

== General election ==
Johnson defeated Porter in November by a narrower margin than Democrats in Texas usually obtained. Johnson returned to Washington as a senator and was permanently dubbed "Landslide Lyndon." Dismissive of his critics, Johnson happily adopted the nickname, though he came to dislike it in later years.

Texas Republicans experienced increased voter support in the years that followed. Porter became a member of the Republican National Committee and provided crucial support to Dwight D. Eisenhower during Eisenhower's presidential candidacy in 1952, which enabled him to obtain the Republican nomination over his main rival, Robert A. Taft. Eisenhower carried Texas in 1952 and again in 1956. In 1960, Democrat John F. Kennedy only narrowly won Texas, despite the presence of Johnson on the ticket as his vice presidential running mate. Republican John Tower won the 1961 special election to replace Johnson in the Senate, a further indication that Porter's 1948 candidacy had put Texas Republicans on the road to viability.

Forty-two counties failed to report their results to the Texas Legislature in time to be canvassed, so their results are not included in the official vote totals. These missing returns were collected later and published as unofficial results.

=== Results ===
United States Senate election in Texas, 1948
| Party | Candidate | Votes | % |
|---|---|---|---|
| Democratic | Lyndon Johnson | 702,985 | 66.22% |
| Republican | Jack Porter | 349,665 | 32.94% |
| Prohibition | Samuel N. Morris | 8,913 | 0.84% |
| Majority | | 353,320 | 33.28% |
| Turnout | | 1,061,563 | |
| Democratic hold | | | |

== See also ==
- Electoral history of Lyndon B. Johnson
- List of close election results
- 1948 United States Senate elections
