= Electoral history of Lyndon B. Johnson =

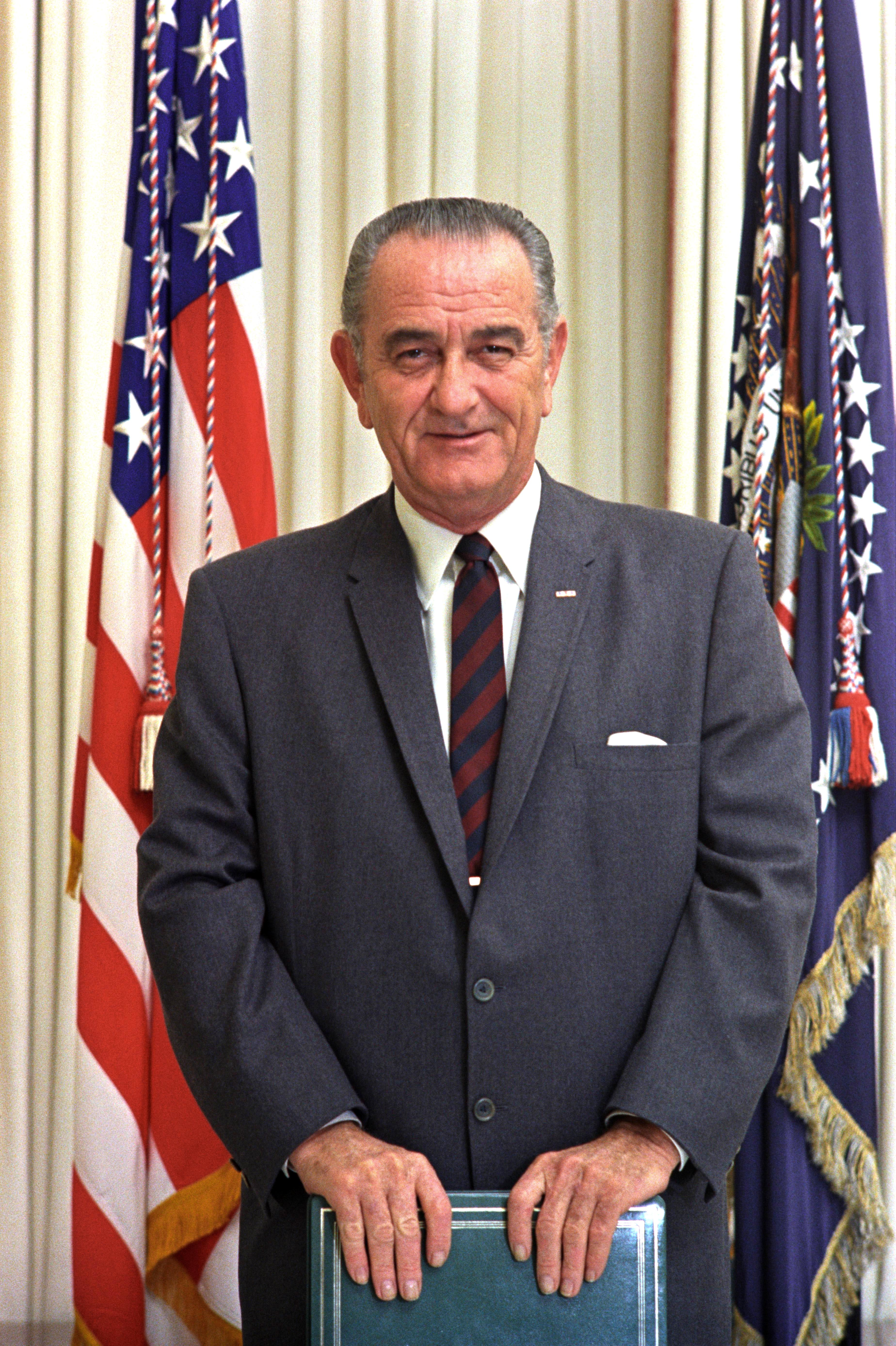
President Lyndon B. Johnson, 1969

Lyndon B. Johnson ran for public office numerous times. He was the 36th president of the United States (1963–1969), the 37th vice president (1961–1963); and as a United States senator (1949–1961) and United States representative (1937–1949) from Texas.

== U.S. House of Representatives elections (1937–1946) ==
1937 Texas's 10th congressional district special election
Party	Candidate	Votes	%
Democratic	Lyndon B. Johnson	8,280	27.65%
Democratic	Merton Harris	5,111	17.07%
Democratic	Polk Shelton	4,420	14.76%
Democratic	Sam V. Stone	4,048	13.52%
Democratic	C. N. Avery	3,951	13.19%
Democratic	Houghton Brownlee	3,019	10.08%
Democratic	Ayers Ross	1,088	3.63%
Democratic	Edwin Waller III	30	0.10%
Total votes		29,947	100.00%
Democratic hold			

1938 Texas's 10th congressional district election
Party	Candidate	Votes	%
Democratic	Lyndon B. Johnson (incumbent)	14,476	100.00%
Total votes		14,476	100.00%
Democratic hold			

1940 Texas's 10th congressional district election
Party	Candidate	Votes	%
Democratic	Lyndon B. Johnson (incumbent)	48,442	100.00%
Total votes		48,442	100.00%
Democratic hold			

1942 Texas's 10th congressional district election
Party	Candidate	Votes	%
Democratic	Lyndon B. Johnson (incumbent)	12,799	100.00%
Total votes		12,799	100.00%
Democratic hold			

1944 Texas's 10th congressional district election, Democratic primary
Party	Candidate	Votes	%
Democratic	Lyndon B. Johnson (incumbent)	26,454	69.90%
Democratic	Buck Taylor	11,393	30.10%
Total votes		37,847	100.00%

1944 Texas's 10th congressional district election
Party	Candidate	Votes	%
Democratic	Lyndon B. Johnson (incumbent)	44,602	92.87%
Republican	Arthur H. Bartelt	3,423	7.13%
Total votes		48,025	100.00%
Democratic hold			

1946 Texas's 10th congressional district election, Democratic primary
Party	Candidate	Votes	%
Democratic	Lyndon B. Johnson (incumbent)	42,980	67.97%
Democratic	Hardy Hollers	17,782	28.12%
Democratic	Charles E. King	2,468	3.90%
Total votes		63,230	100.00%

1946 Texas's 10th congressional district election
Party	Candidate	Votes	%
Democratic	Lyndon B. Johnson (incumbent)	16,947	100.00%
Total votes		16,947	100.00%
Democratic hold			

== U.S. Senate elections (1941–1960) ==
1941 United States Senate special election in Texas
Party	Candidate	Votes	%
Democratic	W. Lee O'Daniel	175,590	30.49%
Democratic	Lyndon B. Johnson	174,279	30.26%
Democratic	Gerald Mann	140,807	24.45%
Democratic	Martin Dies Jr.	80,653	14.01%
Various	Minor candidates	4,548	0.79%
Total votes		29,947	100.00%
Democratic hold			

1948 United States Senate election in Texas, Democratic primary
Party	Candidate	Votes	%
Democratic	Coke R. Stevenson	477,077	39.68%
Democratic	Lyndon B. Johnson	405,617	33.73%
Democratic	George Peddy	237,195	19.73%
Democratic	Otis Myers	15,330	1.28%
Democratic	Frank G. Cortez	13,344	1.11%
Democratic	Roscoe Collier	12,327	1.03%
Democratic	Cyclone Davis	10,871	0.90%
Democratic	Jim Alford	9,117	0.76%
Democratic	F. B. Clark	7,420	0.62%
Democratic	Jesse Saunders	7,401	0.62%
Democratic	Terrell Sledge	6,692	0.56%
Total votes		1,202,391	100.00%

1948 United States Senate election in Texas, Democratic runoff
Party	Candidate	Votes	%
Democratic	Lyndon B. Johnson	494,191	50.004%
Democratic	Coke R. Stevenson	494,104	49.996%
Total votes		988,295	100.00%

1948 United States Senate election in Texas
Party	Candidate	Votes	%
Democratic	Lyndon B. Johnson	702,985	66.22%
Republican	Jack Porter	349,665	32.94%
Prohibition	Samuel N. Norris	8,913	0.84%
Total votes		1,061,563	100.00%
Democratic hold			

1954 United States Senate election in Texas, Democratic primary
Party	Candidate	Votes	%
Democratic	Lyndon B. Johnson (incumbent)	883,264	71.38%
Democratic	Dudley Dougherty	354,188	28.62%
Total votes		1,237,452	100.00%

1954 United States Senate election in Texas
Party	Candidate	Votes	%
Democratic	Lyndon B. Johnson (incumbent)	538,417	84.59%
Republican	Carlos G. Watson	95,033	14.93%
Constitution	Fred T. Spangler	3,025	0.48%
Total votes		636,475	100.00%
Democratic hold			

1960 United States Senate election in Texas
Party	Candidate	Votes	%
Democratic	Lyndon B. Johnson (incumbent)	1,306,625	57.98%
Republican	John Tower	926,653	41.12%
Constitution	Bard A. Logan	20,506	0.91%
Total votes		2,253,784	100.00%
Democratic hold			

== Presidential elections (1956–1968) ==
1956 Democratic National Convention, Presidential tally
Candidate	Votes	%
Adlai Stevenson II	905.5	65.89%
W. Averell Harriman	210	15.27%
Lyndon B. Johnson	80	5.82%
Stuart Symington	45.5	3.35%
Happy Chandler	36.5	2.69%
James C. Davis	33	2.40%
John S. Battle	32.5	2.40%
George Bell Timmerman Jr.	23.5	1.75%
Frank Lausche	5.5	0.44%

1956 Democratic National Convention (Vice Presidential tally):

First ballot:

- Estes Kefauver - 466.5
- John F. Kennedy - 294.5
- Albert Gore Sr. - 178
- Robert F. Wagner Jr. - 162.5
- Hubert Humphrey - 134
- Luther Hodges - 40
- P. T. Maner - 33
- LeRoy Collins - 29
- Clinton Anderson - 16
- Frank G. Clement - 14
- Pat Brown - 1
- Lyndon B. Johnson - 1
- Stuart Symington - 1

1960 Democratic National Convention (Presidential tally):

- John F. Kennedy - 806 (52.89%)
- Lyndon B. Johnson - 409 (26.84%)
- Stuart Symington - 86 (5.64%)
- Adlai Stevenson II - 80 (5.25%)
- Robert Meyner - 43 (2.82%)
- Hubert Humphrey - 42 (2.76%)
- George Smathers - 30 (1.97%)
- Ross Barnett - 23 (1.51%)
- Herschel C. Loveless - 2 (0.13%)
- Pat Brown - 1 (0.07%)
- Orval E. Faubus - 1 (0.07%)
- Albert Rosellini - 1 (0.07%)

1960 Democratic National Convention (Vice Presidential tally):

- Lyndon B. Johnson - 1,521 (100.00%)

1960 United States presidential election:

- John F. Kennedy/Lyndon B. Johnson (D) - 34,220,984 (49.7%) and 303 electoral votes (22 states carried)
- Richard Nixon/Henry Cabot Lodge Jr. (R) - 34,108,157 (49.5%) and 219 electoral votes (26 states carried)
- Harry F. Byrd/Strom Thurmond (I) - 286,359 (0.4%) and 14 electoral votes (2 states carried)
- Harry F. Byrd/Barry Goldwater (I) - 1 electoral vote (Oklahoma faithless elector)
- Orval E. Faubus/James G. Crommelin (States' Rights) - 44,984 (0.1%)

1964 Democratic presidential primaries:

- Pat Brown - 1,693,813 (27.26%)
- Lyndon B. Johnson (inc.) - 1,106,999 (17.82%)
- Sam Yorty - 798,431 (12.85%)
- George Wallace - 798,431 (12.85%)
- John W. Reynolds - 522,405 (8.41%)
- Albert S. Porter - 493,619 (7.94%)
- Matthew E. Welsh - 376,023 (6.05%)
- Daniel Brewster - 267,106 (4.30%)
- Jennings Randolph - 131,432 (2.12%)
- Unpledged - 81,614 (1.31%)
- Robert F. Kennedy - 36,258 (0.58%)
- Lar Daly - 15,160 (0.24%)
- Henry Cabot Lodge Jr. - 8,495 (0.14%)
- Albert J. Easter - 8,275 (0.13%)
- Adlai Stevenson II - 800 (0.01%)
- Hubert Humphrey - 548 (0.01%)

1964 Democratic National Convention (Presidential tally):

- Lyndon B. Johnson (inc.) - 2,316 (100.00%)

1964 United States presidential election:

- Lyndon B. Johnson/Hubert Humphrey (D) - 43,127,041 (61.1%) and 486 electoral votes (44 states and D.C. carried)
- Barry Goldwater/William E. Miller (R) - 27,175,754 (38.5%) and 52 electoral votes (6 states carried)

1968 Democratic presidential primaries:

- Eugene McCarthy - 2,914,933 (38.73%)
- Robert F. Kennedy - 2,305,148 (30.63%)
- Stephen M. Young - 549,140 (7.30%)
- Lyndon B. Johnson (inc.) - 383,590 (5.10%)
- Thomas C. Lynch - 380,286 (5.05%)
- Roger D. Branigin - 238,700 (3.17%)
- George Smathers - 236,242 (3.14%)
- Hubert Humphrey - 166,463 (2.21%)
- Unpledged - 161,143 (2.14%)
- Scott Kelly - 128,899 (1.71%)
- George Wallace - 34,489 (0.46%)
- Richard Nixon (write-in) - 13,610 (0.18%)
- Ronald Reagan (write-in) - 5,309 (0.07%)
- Ted Kennedy - 4,052 (0.05%)
- Paul C. Fisher - 506 (0.01%)
- John G. Crommelin - 186 (0.00%)
