= 1928 United States Senate election in Texas =

- November 6, 1928
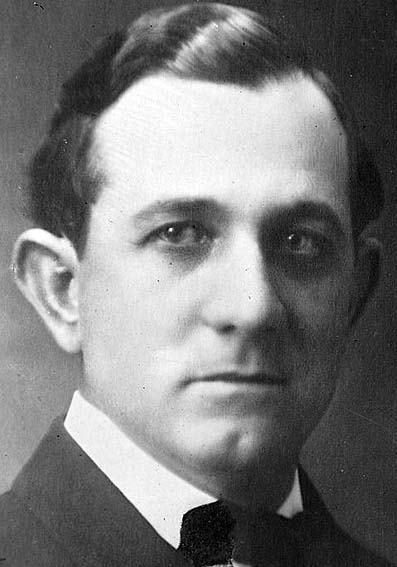

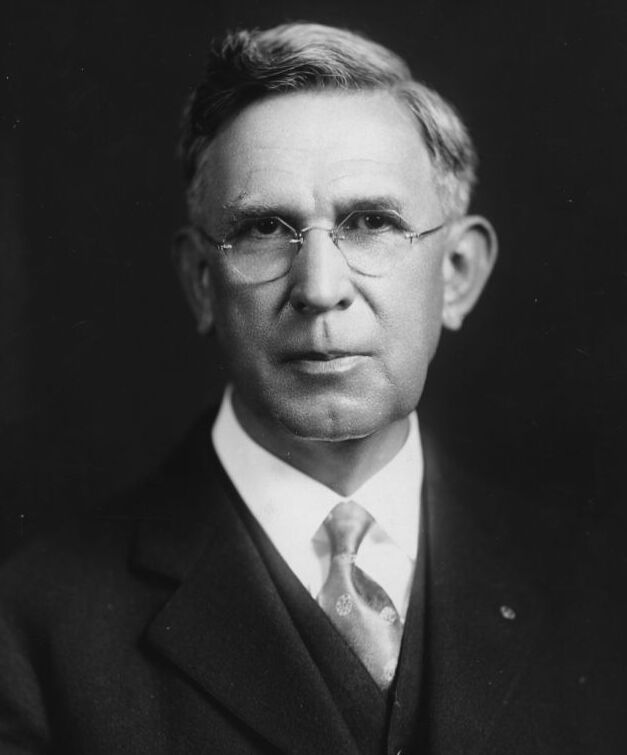
Nominee	Tom Connally	T. M. Kennerly
Party	Democratic	Republican
Popular vote	566,139	129,910
Percentage	81.24%	18.64%
- County results Connally: 50–60% 60–70% 70–80% 80–90% >90% Kennerly: 50–60% 60–70% No votes
U.S. senator before election
Earle Mayfield
Democratic
Elected U.S. Senator
Tom Connally
Democratic

The 1928 United States Senate election in Texas was held on November 6, 1928. Incumbent Democratic U.S. Senator Earle Mayfield ran for re-election to a second term.

Mayfield drew several primary challengers, including former governor Oscar Branch Colquitt and U.S. Representatives Tom Connally and Thomas L. Blanton. The candidates ran on issues such as public utilities, transportation infrastructure, immigration, and agriculture, as well as several of the candidates' records in the House and Senate. The number of high-profile candidates in the race made a runoff almost certain. Mayfield campaigned very little prior to the runoff, which he was confident he would make, as to not alienate the supporters of the candidates who might be eliminated in the first round. Mayfield won a plurality of the vote in the first round, but he failed to win a majority, forcing him into a runoff with the second place finisher, Tom Connally.

Mayfield, who in his previous race had been supported by the Ku Klux Klan, was very ideologically similar to Connally. Despite having been defeated by him in the Democratic primary six years prior, former Governor Pa Ferguson endorsed Mayfield against Connally, considering him to be the lesser of two evils. Despite this endorsement, Connally defeated Mayfield in the primary. The Texas Republican Party nominated attorney Thomas M. Kennerly to run against him. Connally easily defeated Kennerly in the general election, despite Republican Herbert Hoover carrying the state in the concurrent presidential election.

== Democratic primary ==
=== Candidates ===
- Thomas L. Blanton, U.S. Representative from Albany
- Tom Connally, U.S. Representative from Marlin
- Minnie Fisher Cunningham, suffragette and Executive Secretary of the League of Women Voters
- Earle B. Mayfield, incumbent U.S. Senator since 1923
- A. Jeff McLemore, newspaper publisher, former U.S. Representative representing Texas at-large, and State Representative from Corpus Christi (1892–96)
- Alvin M. Owsley, attorney and former National Commander of the American Legion

=== Withdrew ===
- Oscar Branch Colquitt, former Governor of Texas

=== Results ===
1928 Democratic U.S. Senate primary
Party	Candidate	Votes	%
Democratic	Earle B. Mayfield (incumbent)	200,246	29.66%
Democratic	Tom Connally	178,091	26.38%
Democratic	Alvin M. Owsley	131,755	19.52%
Democratic	Thomas L. Blanton	126,758	18.78%
Democratic	Minnie Fisher Cunningham	28,944	4.29%
Democratic	A. Jeff McLemore	9,244	1.37%
Total votes		675,038	100.00%

=== Runoff ===
1928 Democratic U.S. Senate runoff
Party	Candidate	Votes	%
Democratic	Tom Connally	320,071	55.39%
Democratic	Earle B. Mayfield (incumbent)	257,747	44.61%
Total votes		577,818	100.00%

== General election ==
=== Results ===
1928 United States Senate election in Texas
Party	Candidate	Votes	%	±%
Democratic	Tom Connally	566,139	81.24%	▲14.34
Republican	Thomas M. Kennerly	129,910	18.64%	▼14.46
Socialist	David Curran	690	0.10%	N/A
Communist	John Rust	114	0.02%	N/A
Total votes		696,853	100.00%	
Democratic hold				

== See also ==
- 1928 United States Senate elections
