= Murder of Bill Mason =

1949 murder in Alice, Texas

Bill Mason
- Bill Mason
- Born: William Haywood Mason; January 2, 1897; Minneapolis, Minnesota
- Died: July 29, 1949 (aged 52); Alice, Texas
- Cause of death: Gun shot
- Other name: Bill Mason
- Occupations: Radio journalist; Newspaper journalist
- Years active: 1919–1949
- Employer: KBKI Radio
- Children: Burton Mason

William Haywood "Bill" Mason (January 2, 1897 – July 29, 1949) was a radio journalist for KBKI-AM in Alice, Texas. On July 29, 1949, he was murdered by Jim Wells county deputy sheriff Sam Smithwick, after he had heard Mason referring to him in his daily radio broadcast as the owner of a 'dime-a-dance-palace'.

== Bill Mason ==
William Haywood Mason was born on January 2, 1897 in Minneapolis, Minnesota to Clarence Haywood Mason, a manager for the Northwestern Telephone Exchange, and Clara Olmstead ^{nee}. Mason grew up in Minneapolis and graduated from Minneapolis North High School in 1916. After graduation, he enlisted in the Army, serving with the 135th Infantry during World War I. After returning home, he got his first job as a reporter in December 1919, working for the Minneapolis Journal. By 1923, he had moved to the west coast, where he worked for newspapers in Oakland and San Francisco. While living in California, he also worked as an investigator for Earl Warren, when he was the district attorney for Alameda county. (Note: Earl Warren would later become the 30th governor of California, and then Chief Justice of the United States.) In 1933, Mason was living and working in Detroit, where he worked for the D. P. Brothers Ad Agency, and also at one point, was a reporter for the Detroit Bureau of The New York Times.

Sometime in 1941, Mason moved to Akron, Ohio, where he was the public relations director for The General Tire & Rubber Company. In 1944, the company opened manufacturing plants in Baytown, Texas and Waco, Texas. When the plants opened, Mason came up with a marketing campaign called "Texas Goes to War", and traveled to Texas promoting the company. In 1946, be moved to Mexico City and became the press agent for Miguel Alemán Valdés. After Alemán was elected President of Mexico, Mason had a falling out with some of Alemán's lieutenants and swiftly left Mexico. After crossing the border into Texas, and strapped for cash, he took the first job he could find as a reporter in San Antonio. From there, he moved to Alice in 1947 and became managing editor of the Alice Echo. In December 1948, he became the program director for KBKI radio, where his show, "Bill Mason Speaks", was broadcast daily at 12:30. Mason's son Burton, who was also a journalist, had his own show at the station as well, called Duval Doins'.

== Murder ==
In the summer of 1949, Mason had learned that Sam Smithwick owned the land where a bar called Rancho Allegro was located and was being used as a front for gambling and prostitution. On the day before his shooting, he proclaimed on his radio program:

I'm going to take the gloves off today in the prostitute situation and start swinging. Any of you can spend an hour on the south side and see the suffering and misery which is being caused by operation of the dance hall girls. Dance hall girls who work, many of them on the property of Sam Smithwick, a deputy of [Sheriff] Hubert Sain's ... it is the sworn duty of the sheriff to see that the state laws are enforced. But there on Deputy Smithwick's property every night the world's oldest profession is plying its trade, heaping dollars into the pockets of the proprietor of the place. I charge here today that Sam Smithwick knows what is going on. He is out there all the time at night.

On the day of the shooting, Mason had driven to the southwestern edge of Alice to investigate a report of "poor streets" he had received, and was going to report on for his radio show. Alevino Saenz, who was riding along with Mason that day, was a key witness for the prosecution at Smithwick's trial. He testified that Mason and Smithwick were traveling in opposite directions on the same street, and when Smithwick saw Mason's car he waved his hand out his window for them to stop. Saenz said the deputy got out of his truck and approached the driver's side of the car, immediately asking if he was Mr. Mason. Saenz said he was told to get out of the car by Smithwick and when he started to get out of the car, he heard a gunshot and then heard Mason cry out for help. Smithwick had shot Mason, with the bullet hitting him in the chest, right above his heart. A witness named A. F. Eisley stated that Smithwick yelled "You dirty S.O.B.!" at Mason while he was lying wounded on the ground. A Texas Ranger testified the murder weapon, a .45 caliber pistol, embossed with a deputy sheriff's badge on the hand grip, was found on the ground by the open door near Mason's car. Three other witnesses testified they did not see or find a gun on Mason's body.

== Sam Smithwick ==
External image
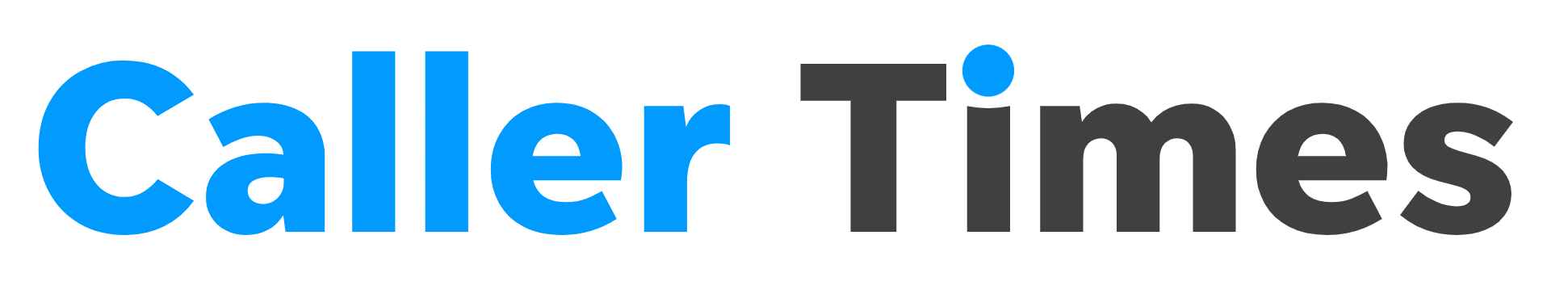
- via Corpus Christi Caller-Times
- Mason murder hearing, August 3, 1949. Smithwick to the left, sitting at end of table.

Sam E. Smithwick was born on January 18, 1889 in Jim Wells County, Texas to Sam Smithwick and Novair Benevides ^{nee}. Smithwick had been a deputy sheriff in Jim Wells county for 24 years. Immediately after the shooting, Smithwick turned himself in. He testified at his trial the shooting was in self-defense. He said he had heard Mason's radio program the day before, and he had gone to Alice to retrieve some tools from his home. When he saw Mason's car driving down his street, he approached the car and decided to talk to him, asking him; "Are you Mr. Mason?" According to Smithwick, Mason replied "yes, what in the hell do you want?" Smithwick told Mason he wanted him to take his name off the radio, and Mason responded by cursing him and calling him a Mexican. Smithwick further testified that Mason's hands were "around his pockets", and again referred to him being cursed at, and then Smithwick said that Mason grabbed for his gun, and he stepped back and pulled his gun out, shooting Mason he claimed in self-defense. Smithwick's defense team also claimed their client didn't own the liquor license for the tavern, but the state provided evidence showing otherwise. A former deputy also testified that he was paid to deliver 70% of the profits from the bar to Smithwick, and several women testified, including Smithwick's own niece, that they had "dated" men in exchange for money. Smithwick was found guilty of murder with malice and sentenced to life in prison.

=== Suicide in prison ===
External image
- via Substack Texas To The World newsletter
- Copy of letter Smithwick wrote to former Texas governor Coke Stevenson

On April 15, 1952, Smithwick committed suicide by hanging himself in his cell at the Huntsville state penitentiary. Two Texas Rangers who investigated his suicide, said in their opinion, that in the "last few days of Smithwick's lifetime, he had become mentally ill". While in prison, Smithwick had written a letter to former Texas governor Coke Stevenson, alleging that he knew the whereabouts of a stolen precinct 13 polling box which Stevenson had maintained cost him the 1948 United States senatorial election. Lyndon B. Johnson had narrowly defeated Stevenson by eighty-seven votes in the election. Referring to the letter in May 1952, Stevenson said "my position two years ago that the U. S. Senate seat was stolen from me has been vindicated". Johnson biographer Robert Caro made the case in his 1990 book that Johnson had stolen the election in Jim Wells County. (Note: In a 1977 taped recording for a story about ballot box 13 by AP reporter James Mangan; Luis Salas, a former election judge in Texas, was recorded telling Mangan: "Johnson did not win that election; It was stolen for him. And I know exactly how it was done". In Smithwick's letter to Stevenson, he references a Louis Salas [sic] as being a depot agent at that time.) Smithwick's son told a Houston Texas newspaper in 1952, that he believed his father was killed because "he knew too much" about a disputed election. His son alleged that his father "knew things that went on in Jim Wells county and Duval county". Around the same time, a journalist for the Houston Press reported there were "strange physical circumstances" surrounding Smithwick's death.

== Reactions ==
The day after Mason's murder, five men shot up the bar, which had been closed and was unoccupied. At Mason's funeral, there were approximately 400 to 500 people in attendance, with many having to stand outside and look in the windows of the church where the services were held. In the closing arguments phase of the murder trial, the prosecuting attorney, James K. Evetts, told the jury, "He had the nerve to tell the truth for a lot of little people." Mason's tombstone is engraved with that quote given by the prosecutor. Frank Lloyd, co-owner of the radio station, told Broadcasting-Telecasting, "it's tragic that Bill Mason should die for using his freedom of speech".

== See also ==
- Box 13 scandal
- List of journalists killed in the United States
