= 1940 United States Senate election in Texas =

- November 5, 1940
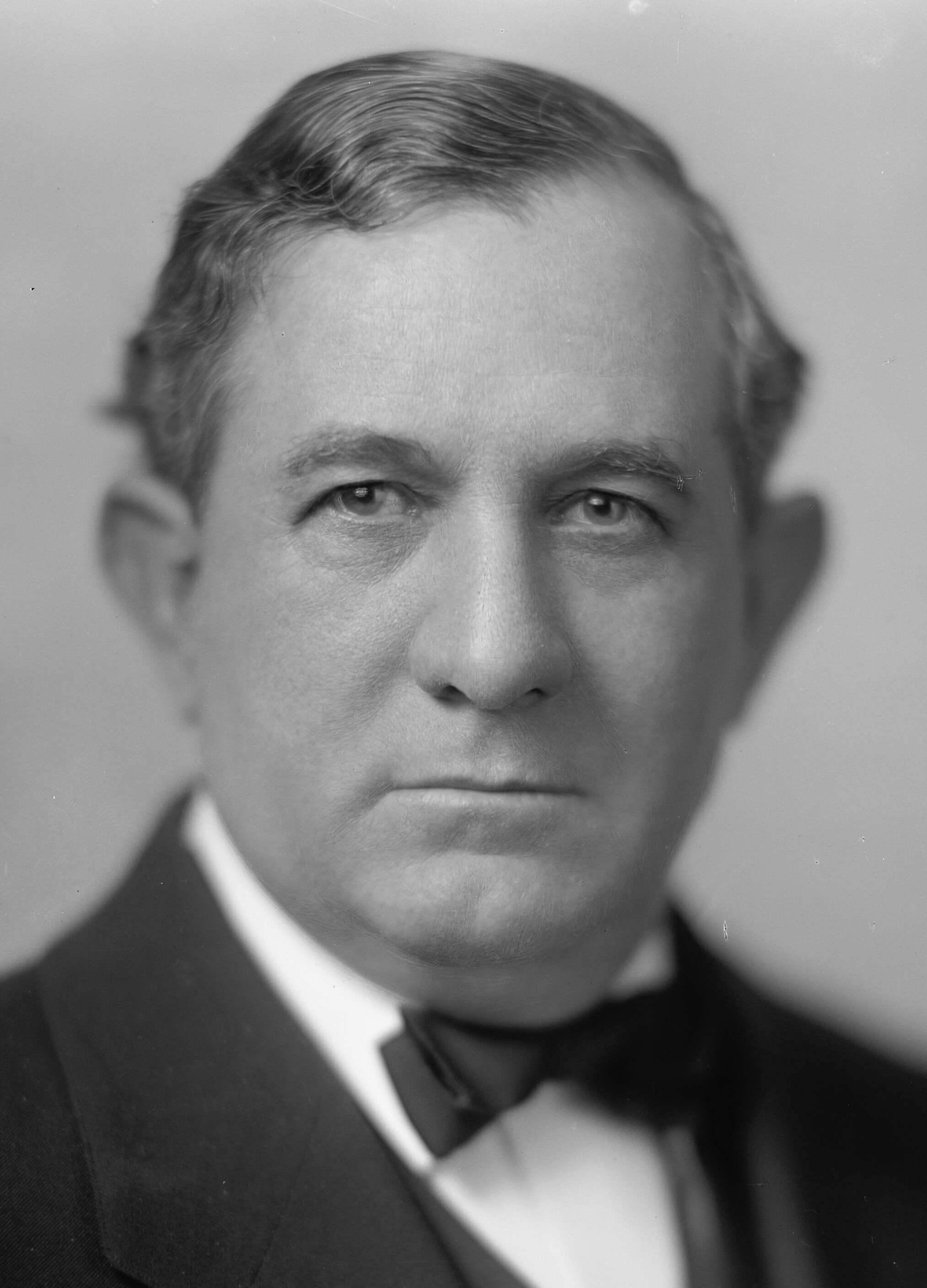

Nominee	Tom Connally	George Shannon
Party	Democratic	Republican
Popular vote	978,095	59,340
Percentage	94.24%	5.72%
- County results Connally: 50–60% 60–70% 70–80% 80–90% >90% No votes
U.S. senator before election
Tom Connally
Democratic
Elected U.S. Senator
Tom Connally
Democratic

The 1940 United States Senate election in Texas was held on November 5, 1940. Incumbent Democratic U.S. Senator Tom Connally was re-elected to his third term in office, with only minor opposition in the Democratic primary and general elections.

== Democratic primary ==
=== Candidates ===
- A. P. Belcher
- Tom Connally, incumbent U.S. Senator since 1929
- Guy B. Fisher

=== Results ===
1940 Democratic U.S. Senate primary
Party	Candidate	Votes	%
Democratic	Tom Connally (incumbent)	923,219	84.83%
Democratic	Guy B. Fisher	98,125	9.02%
Democratic	A.P. Belcher	66,962	6.15%
Total votes		1,088,306	100.00%

== General election ==
Twenty nine counties failed to report their results to the Texas Secretary of State in time to be canvassed, so their results are not included in the official vote totals.

=== Results ===
1940 United States Senate election in Texas
Party	Candidate	Votes	%	±%
Democratic	Tom Connally (incumbent)	978,095	94.24%	▼2.45
Republican	George I. Shannon	59,340	5.72%	▲2.92
Communist	Homer Brooks	408	0.04%	▼0.03
Total votes		1,037,843	100.00%	
Democratic hold				

== See also ==
- 1940 United States Senate elections
