= Texas's 72nd House of Representatives district =

American legislative district

Texas's 72nd State House of Representatives district
Representative
Drew Darby; R–San Angelo

District 72 is a district in the Texas House of Representatives. It has been represented by Republican Drew Darby since 2007.

== Geography ==
The district covers the West Texas counties of Coke, Coleman, Concho, Glasscock, Howard, Irion, Reagan, Runnels, Sterling and Tom Green.

== Members ==
- Tom Connally (1901–1903)
- Scott Edward Campbell (2003–2007)
- Drew Darby (since 2007)
