= Alvin M. Owsley =

American diplomat

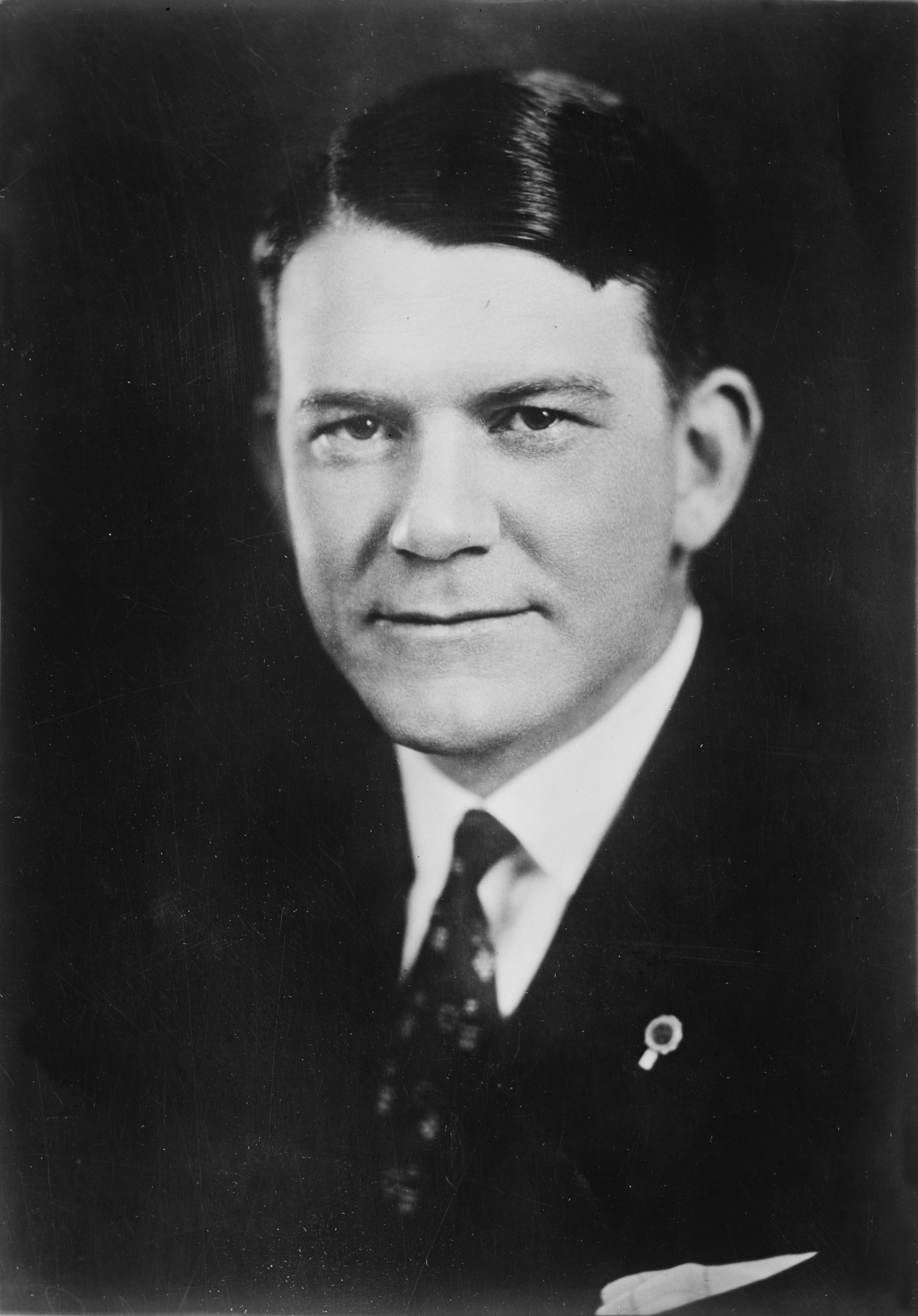
- Alvin M. Owsley, c. 1922

United States Envoy to Denmark
- In office July 16, 1937 – May 15, 1939
- President: Franklin D. Roosevelt
- Preceded by: Ruth Bryan Owen
- Succeeded by: Ray Atherton

United States Envoy to the Irish Free State
- In office July 27, 1935 – July 7, 1937
- President: Franklin D. Roosevelt
- Preceded by: W. W. McDowell
- Succeeded by: John Cudahy

United States Envoy to Romania
- In office September 15, 1933 – June 16, 1935
- President: Franklin D. Roosevelt
- Preceded by: Charles S. Wilson
- Succeeded by: Leland Harrison

National Commander of The American Legion
- In office 1922 – 1923
- Preceded by: Hanford MacNider
- Succeeded by: John R. Quinn

Personal details
- Born: Alvin Mansfield Owsley; June 11, 1888 Denton, Texas, U.S.
- Died: April 3, 1967 (aged 78) Dallas, Texas, U.S.
- Party: Democratic
- Spouse: Lucy Ball Owsley
- Children: 3 (Alvin Jr, David, and Lucy)
- Education: Virginia Military Institute; University of Texas

Military service
- Allegiance: United States
- Branch/service: United States Army
- Years of service: 1909–1919
- Rank: Lieutenant Colonel
- Battles/wars: World War I

Alvin Mansfield Owsley (June 11, 1888 – April 3, 1967) was an American lawyer, military leader, and diplomat who served as the national commander of the American Legion from 1922 to 1923, and later served as United States minister to Romania, the Irish Free State, and Denmark.

== Early life and education ==
Owsley was born and raised in Denton, Texas, son of Alvin Clark and Sallie (Blount) Owsley. He remained in Texas with his family while working for his elementary and secondary education, and also while attending a term at North Texas State College in 1904. Later that year, he joined the Virginia Military Institute, where he developed into captain of Company A, and in 1909 graduated in the upper tier of his class. He completed his law degree at the University of Texas in 1912.

=== Family ===
He married Lucy Ball of Muncie, Indiana, in May 1925. They had three children.

=== Early career ===
He began work in 1912 with his father's legal firm, but then served in the Texas Legislature during the 1913–1914 session. In 1915, he became the county and district attorney in Denton County, a title he held until 1917.

== World War I ==
Owsley traded his political and legal responsibilities to serve in World War I with the 36th Infantry Division. He was involved in many important World War I campaigns and offensives through 1918, especially the Meuse-Argonne Offensive. He was honourably discharged as a lieutenant colonel in 1919. His discharge was accompanied by several military decorations as well, including the French Legion of Honour and the Order of Polonia Restituta.

== The American Legion ==
Owsley was present in 1919 at the formative caucus meeting of the American Legion in Paris, and was later elected National Commander in 1921, spending his year long term in support of veterans' issues, such as prosecution of war profiteers. Using official records from Washington, Owsley found that over one hundred thousand war veterans were not receiving adequate financial support. During his 1922–1923 tenure as leader of the American Legion, Owsley made speeches in which he openly endorsed vigorous opposition to Communism as exemplified in Italy by Benito Mussolini. In a 1923 comment, he characterized the Legion as the American equivalent of the Italian Fascisti, ready to dismantle threats to the nation with similar force. His rhetoric peaked with the suggestion that the Legion might even stage a coup to prevent Communists from seizing power. There was no official endorsement of his position. Owlsey's main priorities were on display at a San Francisco assembly just before retiring from his head position, where he stated that better hospitalization, rehabilitation, adjusted compensation, and Americanization were necessary for veterans.

== Career ==
From 1923 to 1933 the legal partnership of Burgess, Owsley, Story, and Stewart was the focus of Owsley's career. In 1924, he received 152 votes for Vice President at the Democratic National Convention. With gained stability at home in Texas, in May 1925 Alvin married Lucy Ball, daughter of Frank Ball of the Ball Brothers. He attempted an unsuccessful campaign for the Democratic nomination to the United States Senate in 1928. In 1933, Owsley was rewarded for his efforts as a campaign speaker for Franklin D. Roosevelt with an appointment as the US Minister to Romania (1933–1935). He also served as minister to the Irish Free State (1935–1937) and completed his diplomatic work as minister to Denmark (1937–1939). He resigned in 1939, with increased international tensions and Roosevelt's announcement for a third term as president.

== Later life ==
Though a Democrat, Owsley rejected Roosevelt's bid to run for a third term and campaigned for Wendell Willkie in 1940. Owsley remained in politics, but helping the Texas campaigns of Republicans Thomas E. Dewey and Dwight D. Eisenhower. In 1941, he started work for his father-in-law, Frank Ball, at the Ball Brothers' Glass Manufacturing Company, first in Muncie, Indiana, and in 1944 moving to Dallas, where he retired as vice president. He represented the American Legion in support of American soldier William S. Girard in his 1957–1958 manslaughter trial in Tokyo. Owsley died in Dallas in 1967.

== Legacy ==
At the University of Texas, the Alvin Owsley Endowed Presidential Scholarship in Law was established in 1991 for his son Alvin M Owsley Jr.

Non-profit organization positions
Preceded by Hanford MacNider	National Commander of The American Legion; 1922 – 1923	Succeeded by John R. Quinn
Diplomatic posts
Preceded by Charles S. Wilson	United States Envoy to Romania; 1933 – 1935	Succeeded by Leland Harrison
Preceded by W. W. McDowell	United States Envoy to the Irish Free State; 1935 – 1937	Succeeded by John Cudahy
Preceded by Ruth Bryan Owen	United States Envoy to Denmark; 1937 – 1939	Succeeded by Ray Atherton
