= Drew Darby =

Texas state legislator

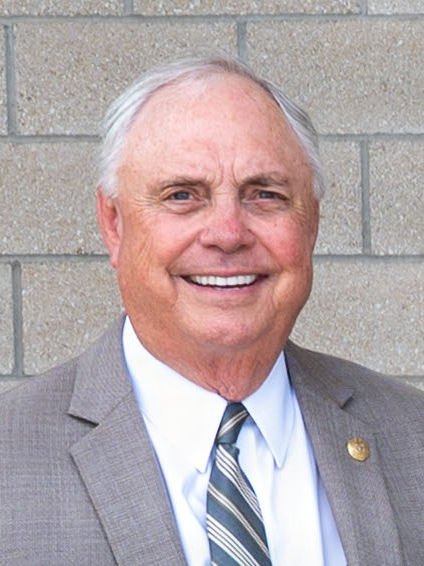
- Darby in 2026

Member of the Texas House of Representatives from the 72nd district
- Incumbent
- Assumed office January 9, 2007
- Preceded by: Scott Edward Campbell

Personal details
- Born: February 22, 1947 (age 79) San Angelo, Texas, U.S.
- Party: Republican
- Spouse: Clarisa Darby
- Children: 5
- Education: University of Texas at Austin (BBA, JD); University of Virginia Darden School of Business (Emerging Leaders Program)
- Occupation: Attorney; businessman
- Website: Campaign website

William Drew Darby (born February 22, 1947) is an American politician. A Republican, he is a member of the Texas House of Representatives from his native San Angelo, Texas. He represents District 72, which comprises the West Texas counties of Coke, Concho, Glasscock, Howard, Irion, Reagan, Runnels, Sterling, and Tom Green.

== Early life ==
Darby is a former member of the San Angelo City Council. He is a past chairman of the San Angelo Water Advisory Board and the Lake Nasworthy Advisory Board.

== Texas House of Representatives ==
The Texas Association of Counties honored Darby as a "Friend of County Government" in 2009 and 2011.

Darby was renominated for a fifth term in House District 72 in the Republican primary held on March 4, 2014. He received 11,697 votes (79.5%) to his intra-party challenger Shannon Thomason's 3,022 (20.5%).

Darby ran without opposition in the general election held on November 6, 2018.

In the 2013 Texas legislative session, Darby was chairman of the House Redistricting Committee and sat on the Appropriations (as chairman of the Appropriations Subcommittee on Natural Resources, Business and Economic Development and Regulatory Agencies) and Higher Education committees.

In the 2015 Texas legislative session, Darby was chairman of the House Energy Resources Committee and sat on the Ways & Means Committee.

In the 2017 Texas legislative session, Darby serves as chairman of the House Energy Resources Committee and chairman of the Select Committee on State and Federal Power and Responsibility. He also serves on the House Ways & Means and Redistricting committees.

== Personal life ==
Darby is a native of San Angelo. He was arrested in November 2013, for having brought a gun in his carry-on bag through a security checkpoint at Austin-Bergstrom International Airport. On January 3, 2014, Travis County 147th Criminal District Court Judge Cliff Brown granted the Travis County District Attorney's office request to dismiss the case when the investigation found no intent by Darby to violate the law.

He is a member of the Texas Farm Bureau, the Texas Sheep and Goat Raisers' Association, the Tom Green County Bar Association, the State Bar of Texas, and the San Angelo Chamber of Commerce.

Texas House of Representatives
Preceded by Scott Edward Campbell	Texas State Representative for District 72; 2007–present	Succeeded by Incumbent
