= Box 13 scandal =

1948 voting scandal involving Lyndon B. Johnson

The Box 13 scandal was a political scandal in Jim Wells County, Texas, during the 1948 United States Senate elections, regarding disputed votes in a Democratic primary involving future president Lyndon B. Johnson and Coke Stevenson.

== Origins and investigation ==
The Texas Democratic Party primary for the U.S. Senate, held in July 1948, was hotly contested and produced an inconclusive result. On the day of the runoff election, which was held the following month, Johnson appeared to have lost the Democratic nomination to Stevenson. Six days after polls had closed, 202 additional votes were added to the totals for Precinct 13 of Jim Wells County, 200 for Johnson and two for Stevenson. This resulted in a narrow lead for Johnson.

The subsequent recount, handled by the Democratic State Central Committee, took a week. Johnson was announced the winner by 87 votes out of 988,295, an extremely narrow margin of victory. Suspicions arose that the 202 late ballots were fraudulent. The names added to the end of the tally sheet were in alphabetical order and written with the same pen and handwriting. Some of the individuals whose names were listed insisted they had not voted that day, and the last person whose name was recorded before the questionable entries stated that when he voted shortly before the polls closed, there had been no one in line behind him.

Stevenson took the dispute to court, and the case eventually reached the U.S. Supreme Court. Johnson prevailed because jurisdiction over naming a nominee rested with the state party, not the federal government. A private, non-official investigation found that Johnson had conspired with George Parr, a Democratic Party leader in Texas, to falsify vote totals. In the general election, Johnson defeated the Republican nominee, Jack Porter, by a margin of 33.28% and 353,320 votes.

== Aftermath ==
Shortly before his apparent suicide by hanging in 1952, former Jim Wells county deputy sheriff Sam Smithwick claimed to have information about the stolen election. Smithwick, who was at the time serving a prison sentence for the murder of Bill Mason, sent a letter to Stevenson encouraging him to visit Smithwick in Huntsville Penitentiary; however he was found dead by hanging in his cell soon after. Smithwick's family believed that he had been murdered to prevent him from telling what he knew about the election.

Johnson biographer Robert Caro argued in his 1990 book that Johnson had stolen the election in Jim Wells County. Box Thirteen, a stage play by Jack Westin based on the scandal, was performed at the College of the Mainland Community Theatre during the 1998–1999 season.

In 2023, the family of Associated Press reporter James Mangan donated taped interviews to the LBJ Presidential Library and Museum, which formed the basis for his reporting on the scandal in 1977. Mangan corroborated the story with Luis Salas, who worked as an election judge in South Texas. Salas told Mangan that the powerful South Texas political boss George B. Parr ordered that some 200 votes be added to the totals for Box 13. Salas said he then watched as the names of individuals who had not voted were added to the tally sheet.
