= Tom Connally =

American politician (1877–1963)

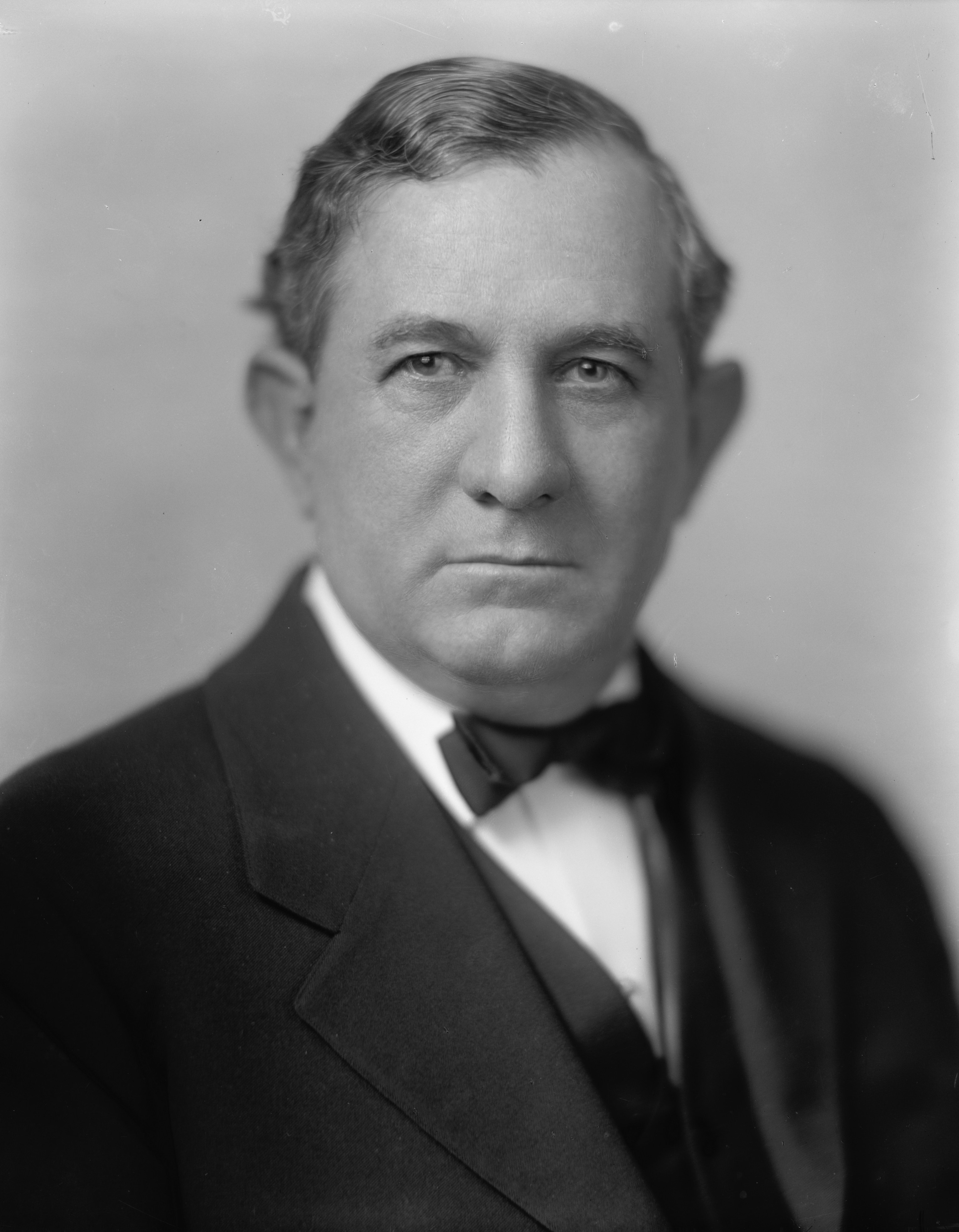

United States Senator from Texas
- In office March 4, 1929 – January 3, 1953
- Preceded by: Earle B. Mayfield
- Succeeded by: Price Daniel

Member of the U.S. House of Representatives from Texas's 11th district
- In office March 4, 1917 – March 3, 1929
- Preceded by: Robert L. Henry
- Succeeded by: Oliver H. Cross

Member of the Texas House of Representatives
- In office January 8, 1901 – January 10, 1905
- Preceded by: Sam Little
- Succeeded by: Austin Milton Kennedy; W. C. O'Bryan
- Constituency: 72nd district (1901–1903); 69th district (1903–1905)

Personal details
- Born: Thomas Terry Connally; August 19, 1877 Hewitt, Texas, U.S.
- Died: October 28, 1963 (aged 86) Washington, D.C., U.S.
- Party: Democratic
- Spouses: Louise Clarkson (m. 1904; died 1935) Lucile Sanderson Sheppard (m. 1942)
- Children: Ben Clarkson Connally
- Education: Baylor University (AB); University of Texas at Austin (LLB)

Thomas Terry Connally (August 19, 1877 – October 28, 1963) was an American politician who represented Texas in both the U.S. Senate and the U.S. House of Representatives as a member of the Democratic Party. He served in the U.S. House of Representatives from 1917 to 1929, and in the U.S. Senate from 1929 to 1953.

He was a segregationist who advocated in favor of Jim Crow laws, for example opposing equal education for black people, and against anti-lynching legislation. In the House, Connally was a staunch Wilsonian Democrat who campaigned in favor of the League of Nations, and the World Court. In the Senate, he chaired the Committee on Foreign Relations from 1941, giving strong support to President Franklin Roosevelt's anti-German and anti-Japanese policies. He worked with Republican Senator Arthur H. Vandenberg to ensure bipartisan support for an internationalist policy, including the new United Nations. He led the committee in supporting the Truman Doctrine in 1947, the Marshall Plan in 1948 and NATO in 1949.

== Early life and education ==
Connally studied at Baylor University and earned his A.B. in 1896. He later attended the University of Texas School of Law, earning his LL.B. in 1898. While there, Connally was a close friend of future Governor of Texas Pat Neff and future United States Senator Morris Sheppard. After earning his law degree, he enlisted in the 2nd Texas Volunteer Infantry to fight in the Spanish–American War. After the end of the war, he established a law firm in Marlin, Texas, where he worked until his entry into politics.

== Political career ==
=== House career ===
Connally ran unopposed and was elected to the Texas House of Representatives in 1900 and 1902. During his tenure in the Texas House he was a prominent opponent of monopolies and co-authored the Texas Anti-Trust Law of 1903. After 1904, he left state politics to pursue his legal career, and served as the prosecuting attorney for Falls County from 1906 to 1910. In 1916, he made his first foray into national politics by running for the vacant House seat for the 11th Congressional District of Texas. When first standing for Congress, Connally did so on a platform calling for (amongst other measures) higher taxes for these in upper-income brackets, new labor laws “favorable to the workingman,” and a child-labor law.

After taking a leave of absence to fight in World War I, Connally returned to the House where he served on the House Committee on Foreign Affairs and worked against isolationist policies.

=== Senate career ===
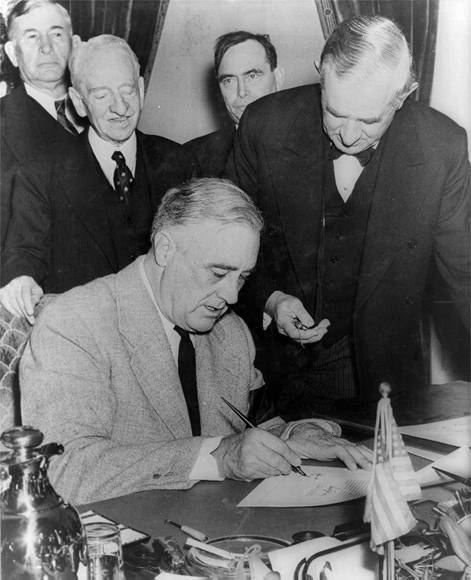
Connally (next to Roosevelt) holding a watch to fix the exact time of the declaration of war against Germany (3:05 PM E.S.T. on December 11, 1941)

In 1928, Connally was elected to the U.S. Senate. During his time in the Senate, he supported Roosevelt's New Deal legislation through the passage of the Connally Hot Oil Act of 1935, which attempted to circumvent the U.S. Supreme Court's rejection of a key part of New Deal legislation.

Connally was in the Southern Caucus and opposed to federal action on civil rights. Connally led a six week filibuster of the Anti-Lynching Bill of 1937. He was also opposed to equal education for black people. Later he came into conflict with Richard Russell who chaired the caucus over Russell's more reasonable approach - a conflict which Russell won. Connally was, however, opposed to the Dixiecrats, once reflecting in his autobiography (in regards to the 1948 presidential election) that “I strongly opposed the Dixiecrat movement during the Convention. A hard-boiled group of Southern Democrats, they were extremely conservative. All they talked about was states’ rights, their hatred of Roosevelt, even though he was dead, and their contempt for Truman."

Although ideologically progressive, and generally supportive of the New Deal, Connally didn't always support Roosevelt. He opposed, for instance, Roosevelt's proposal to reform the Supreme Court. Connally opposed it partly on liberal grounds, arguing “Let some reactionary administration come to power,” I warned, “and it would immediately say: ‘The Democrats stacked the court, and now we have as much right to restack as they had. We will thereby add enough judges so that we will have a responsive court, a court that will do the bidding of this reactionary administration and repeal all the liberal laws placed on the statute books by the Democrats.’ ”

In 1953, Connally retired from the Senate, ending his career in national politics.

=== Role as chairman of the Foreign Relations Committee ===
During most of his tenure in the Senate Connally was a member of the Senate Foreign Relations Committee, and served as chairman from 1941 to 1947, and 1949 to 1953. As Chairman of the Senate Foreign Relations Committee, he was instrumental in the ratification of the treaty creating the North Atlantic Treaty Organization.

He was also a member and vice-chairman of the United Nations Conference on International Organization in 1945 that chartered the United Nations. He authored the noted "Connally Amendment," which amended the U.S. ratification of the U.N. charter to bar the International Court of Justice from having jurisdiction over domestic matters '"as determined by the United States"'.

In 1943 a confidential analysis by British scholar Isaiah Berlin of the Senate Foreign Relations Committee for the British government characterized Senator Connally:

The chairman of the Committee, Tom Connally of Texas, is a very typical, exuberant Southern figure with the appearance and mannerisms of an old-fashioned actor and a gay and hearty manner which conceals lack both of strength and of clear public principles. He is normally the spokesman of the Administration and, in particular, of the Department of State. His voting record is that of a straight interventionist. His principal point of deviation from [Secretary of State] Hull's policies is the subject to which Mr. Hull has dedicated a large portion of his life, namely, the policy of reciprocal trade. Representing as he does, a great cattle breeding State, his enthusiasm for free trade with, e.g., the Argentine, is not ardent. He has been a solid supporter of the department's policies toward, e.g., France and North Africa. His support of its economic policies is regarded as doubtful. On internal issues he shares all the beliefs and prejudices of the South.

During his time in office, Senator Connally also served as the first delegate from the United States to the United Nations First Committee, known at the time in 1946 as The Political and Security Committee. Meetings of the First Committee were held from October to December 1946 in the village of Lake Success in New York. Mr. Connally was the first to move for the recommendation to the General Assembly to accept the applications of Afghanistan, Iceland, and Sweden, after they had been approved by the Security Council.

On October 20, 1951, when General Mark Wayne Clark, an Episcopalian whose mother was Jewish, was nominated by President Harry Truman to be the U.S. emissary to the Holy See, Connally protested against the decision on the basis that Clark was alleged to have caused a large number of needless deaths at the Battle of Rapido River. Clark withdrew his nomination on January 13, 1952.

== Personal life ==
Connally's first wife was Cincinnati Conservatory-trained vocalist Louise Clarkson of Marlin, Texas, who died in her husband's Senate office of a sudden heart attack in 1935. The couple had one son, Houston attorney Ben Clarkson Connally, a U.S. district judge. Connally later married Lucile Sanderson Sheppard, the widow of his former Senate colleague, Morris Sheppard of Texarkana, Texas.

== Death ==
Tom Connally died of pneumonia on October 28, 1963. He is buried in Calvary Cemetery in Marlin, Texas, next to his first wife.

Texas House of Representatives
Preceded by Sam Little	Member of the Texas House of Representatives from District 72 (Marlin); 1901–1903	Succeeded by John W. Stollenwerck, Sr. Samuel R. Boyd
Preceded by Abram Cole	Member of the Texas House of Representatives from District 69 (Marlin); 1903–1905 along with: J. S. Ainsworth^{(1)}	Succeeded by Austin Milton Kennedy; W. C. O'Bryan
U.S. House of Representatives
Preceded by Robert L. Henry	Member of the U.S. House of Representatives from Texas's 11th congressional district 1917–1929	Succeeded by Oliver H. Cross
Party political offices
Preceded by Earle B. Mayfield	Democratic nominee for U.S. Senator from Texas (Class 1); 1928, 1934, 1940, 1946	Succeeded by Price Daniel
U.S. Senate
Preceded by Earle B. Mayfield	U.S. senator (Class 1) from Texas; 1929–1953; Served alongside: Morris Sheppard, Andrew Jackson Houston, W. Lee O'Daniel, Lyndon B. Johnson	Succeeded by Price Daniel
Preceded by Henry W. Keyes	Chair of the Senate Public Buildings and Grounds Committee; 1933–1942	Succeeded by Francis T. Maloney
Preceded by Walter F. George	Chair of the Senate Foreign Relations Committee; 1941–1947	Succeeded by Arthur H. Vandenberg
Preceded by Arthur H. Vandenberg	Ranking Member of the Senate Foreign Relations Committee; 1947–1949	Succeeded by Arthur H. Vandenberg
Preceded by Arthur H. Vandenberg	Chair of the Senate Foreign Relations Committee; 1949–1953	Succeeded by Alexander Wiley
Notes and references
1. For the 27th Legislature, District 69 was a multi-member district.
