= 1946 United States Senate election in Texas =

- November 5, 1946
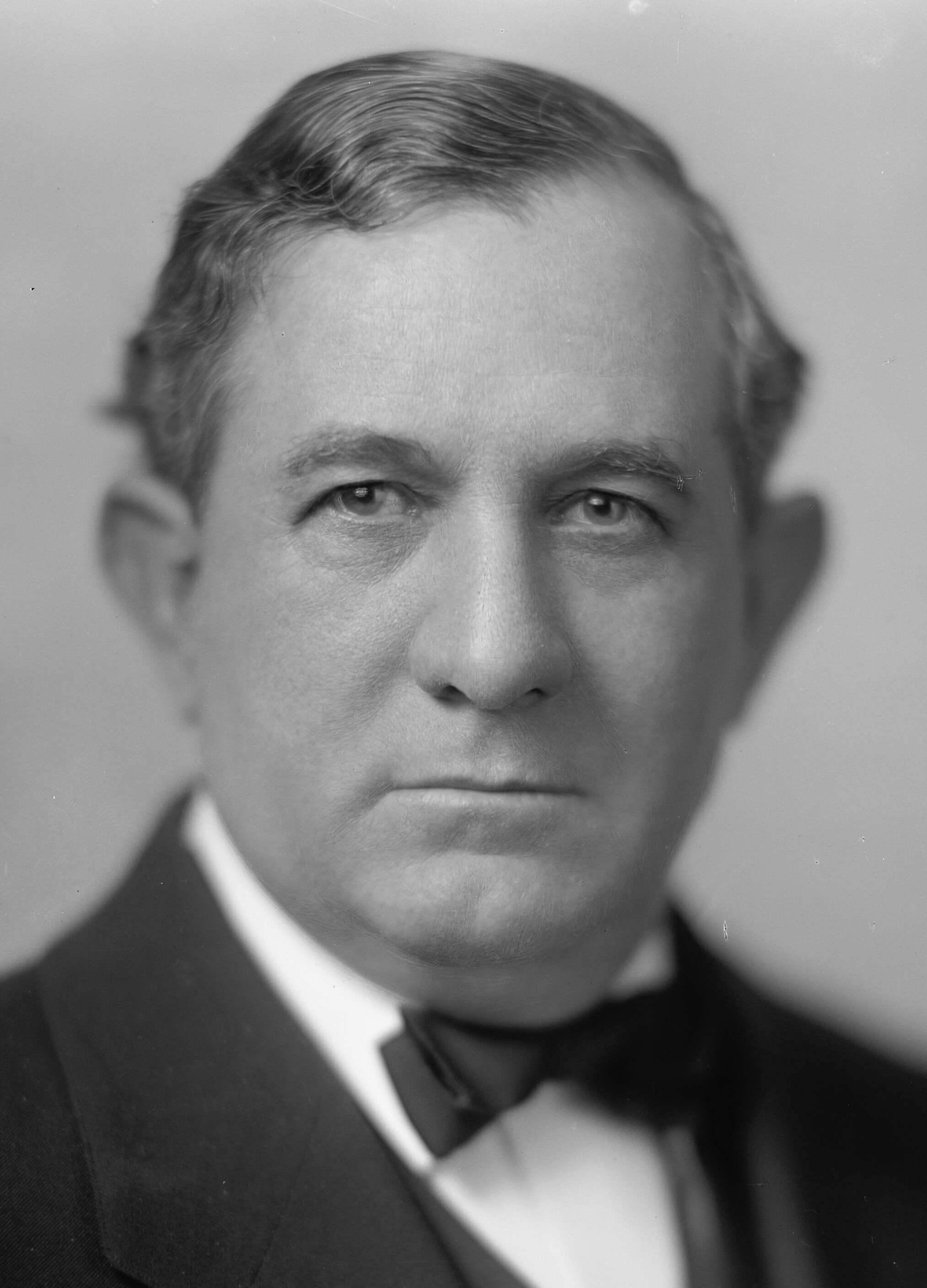

Nominee	Tom Connally	Murray Sells
Party	Democratic	Republican
Popular vote	336,931	43,750
Percentage	88.51%	11.49%
- County results Connally: 60–70% 70–80% 80–90% >90% Sells: 50–60% No votes
U.S. senator before election
Tom Connally
Democratic
Elected U.S. Senator
Tom Connally
Democratic

The 1946 United States Senate election in Texas was held on November 5, 1946. Incumbent Democratic U.S. Senator Tom Connally was re-elected to his fourth term in office, with only minor opposition in the Democratic primary and general elections.

== Democratic primary ==
=== Candidates ===
- Tom Connally, incumbent U.S. Senator since 1929
- Arlon Barton Davis, perennial candidate and son of former U.S. Representative James "Cyclone" Davis
- Floyd E. Ryan
- Terrell Sledge
- Charles L. Somerville

=== Results ===
1946 Democratic U.S. Senate primary
Party	Candidate	Votes	%
Democratic	Tom Connally (incumbent)	823,818	75.40%
Democratic	Floyd E. Ryan	85,292	7.81%
Democratic	Arlon Barton Davis	74,252	6.80%
Democratic	Terrell Sledge	66,947	6.13%
Democratic	Charles L. Somerville	42,290	3.87%
Total votes		1,092,599	100.00%

== General election ==
=== Results ===
1946 United States Senate election in Texas
Party	Candidate	Votes	%	±%
Democratic	Tom Connally (incumbent)	336,931	88.51%	▼7.73
Republican	Murray C. Sells	43,750	11.49%	▲13.29
Total votes		380,681	100.00%	
Democratic hold				

== See also ==
- 1946 United States Senate elections
