= Earle B. Mayfield =

U.S. Senator from Texas supported by the Ku Klux Klan

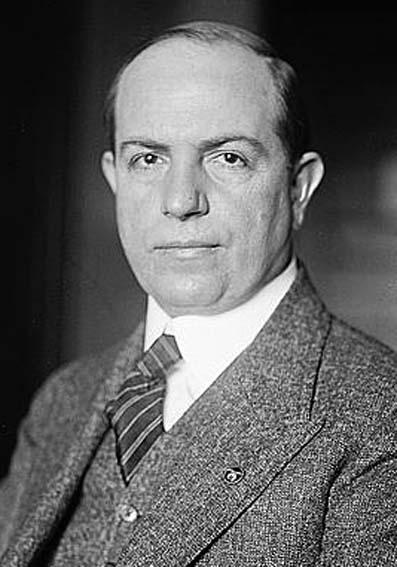

United States Senator from Texas
- In office March 4, 1923 – March 3, 1929
- Preceded by: Charles A. Culberson
- Succeeded by: Tom Connally

Railroad Commissioner of Texas
- In office January 2, 1913 – March 1, 1923
- Governor: Oscar Branch Colquitt; James E. Ferguson; William P. Hobby; Pat Morris Neff
- Preceded by: John L. Wortham
- Succeeded by: Walter Marshall William Splawn

Member of the Texas Senate from the 27th district
- In office January 8, 1907 – September 25, 1912
- Preceded by: Robert W. Martin
- Succeeded by: Charles W. Taylor

Personal details
- Born: April 12, 1881 Overton, Texas, US
- Died: June 23, 1964 (aged 83) Tyler, Texas, US
- Party: Democratic
- Spouse: Ora Lumpkin (m. 1902)
- Children: 3

Earle Bradford Mayfield (April 12, 1881 – June 23, 1964) was a Texas lawyer, who from 1907 to 1913 was a Texas state senator. In 1922, he was elected to the U.S. Senate as a Democrat. He was the first U.S. senator to be widely considered by the voters to be a member of the revived Ku Klux Klan in the 1920s. Mayfield quietly accepted KKK support, but never said he had joined. He was defeated for reelection in 1928 when his opponent attacked his links to the KKK.

== Early life ==
Mayfield was born in Overton, Texas, April 12, 1881, to the marriage of John Blythe Mayfield (1857–1921) and Mary Ellen DeGuerin (maiden; 1859–1886). He graduated from high school in Timpson, Texas, and then from Tyler Business College.

In 1900, Mayfield graduated from Southwestern University, and he studied law at the University of Texas at Austin from 1900 to 1901. He continued to study law, was admitted to the bar in 1907, and practiced in Meridian, Bosque County. Mayfield was also involved in several business ventures, including the wholesale grocery industry and operation of several farms.

== Political career ==
=== State politics ===
Mayfield, a Democrat, was elected to the Texas State Senate, where he served from 1907 to 1913. He was also a member of the Texas Railroad Commission from 1913 to 1923.

=== United States Senate ===
In 1922, Mayfield was one of six candidates who challenged five-term United States Senator Charles A. Culberson for the Democratic senatorial nomination. In the ensuing runoff between Mayfield and former Governor James E. Ferguson, Mayfield was openly allied with the Ku Klux Klan in support of prohibition and continued segregation of Whites and Blacks, while Ferguson spoke out against the Klan and was strongly against prohibition. At the time, the sale of alcoholic beverages was illegal throughout the United States under the Eighteenth Amendment to the United States Constitution.

After securing the endorsement of the other U.S. senator from Texas, Morris Sheppard of Texarkana, Mayfield won the Democratic nomination. In the general election held on November 7, 1922, Mayfield faced the Independent candidate George Peddy, who also had the backing of the Republican Party. Because Peddy's name was not on the ballot, his supporters waged a write-in campaign. Peddy's write-in effort netted him a third of the vote.

After the election, Peddy challenged the results on the grounds of disputes over filing deadlines and other technical issues. A senate committee ruled in Mayfield's favor, and the full senate voted to seat him, but his swearing in was delayed. He took office on December 3, 1923.

in 1928, Mayfield faced a large field of candidates and was defeated in the runoff by Tom Connally, a member of the United States House of Representatives from McLennan County; winning the Democratic nomination was tantamount to winning the overall election. Connally went on to win the seat, succeeding Mayfield.

In 1930, Mayfield sought the Democratic nomination for governor, but finished seventh among 11 candidates; Ross Sterling won the election.

== Retirement and death ==
After losing his senate seat, Mayfield moved to Tyler. He continued to practice law and manage his business interests until retiring in 1952.

Mayfield died in Tyler on June 23, 1964, and was buried at Oakwood Cemetery in Tyler.

== Family ==
On June 10, 1902, in Bosque County, Texas, Mayfield married Ora Lumpkin (1882–1979). They were the parents of three sons. Mayfield's uncle, Allison Mayfield (1860–1923), had been the Texas Secretary of State and, from January 5, 1897, chairman of the Railroad Commission until his death, January 23, 1923.

== Legacy ==
Mayfield received the honorary degree of doctor of humane letters from John Brown University in Siloam Springs, Arkansas.

Party political offices
Preceded by Charles Allen Culberson	Democratic nominee for U.S. Senator from Texas (Class 1); 1922	Succeeded by Tom Connally
Texas Senate
Preceded by Robert W. Martin	Texas State Senator from District 27 (Meridian); 1907–1913	Succeeded by Charles W. Taylor
Political offices
Preceded by Charles A. Culberson	U.S. senator (Class 1) from Texas; 1923–1929	Succeeded by Tom Connally
