= George Peddy =

Texas lawyer, military officer, and politician

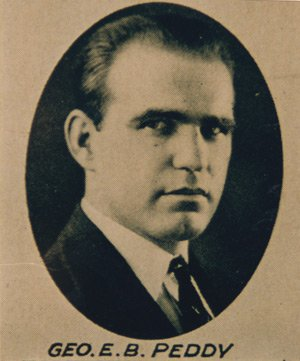
- Peddy, probably as a member of the Texas House of Representatives in 1917
- Born: George Edwin Bailey Peddy; August 22, 1892; Tenaha, Texas, U.S.
- Died: June 13, 1951 (aged 58); Houston, Texas, U.S.
- Resting place: Ramah Cemetery, Tenaha, Texas, U.S.
- Education: University of Texas School of Law (LL.B., 1920)
- Occupation: Attorney
- Political party: Democratic
- Spouse(s): Gertrude Irwin (m. 1921–1951, his death)
- Military career
- Allegiance: United States
- Branch: United States Army
- Service years: 1917–1919; 1942–1946
- Rank: Lieutenant colonel
- Units: 163rd Infantry Regiment; Eighth Service Command; 5th Infantry Division
- Commands: Company K, 360th Infantry Regiment
- Conflicts: World War I World War II
- Awards: Bronze Star Medal; Croix de Guerre

George Peddy (August 22, 1892 – June 13, 1951) was an American attorney, military officer, and political figure from Texas. A 1920 graduate of the University of Texas School of Law, he practiced law in Houston with the prominent firm of Vinson, Elkins, Weems, and Francis. A Democrat, He served in the Texas House of Representatives in 1917 and ran two high-profile but unsuccessful campaigns for the United States Senate (1922, 1948). A United States Army veteran of World War I and World War II, he attained the rank of lieutenant colonel while serving with the 5th Infantry Division in France during the Second World War, and received the Bronze Star Medal and Croix de Guerre.

== Early life ==
George Edwin Bailey Peddy was born on a farm near Tenaha, Texas, on August 22, 1892, the youngest of seven sons born to William Henry Peddy and Laura Gertrude (Chambers) Peddy. His father died two months before Peddy's birth, and from a young age he helped support the family by working on the farm, which grew cotton, corn, sugarcane, and peanuts. After attending the district schools near his home, Peddy performed labor for a resident of Tenaha in exchange for room and board, which enabled him to attend Tenaha Academy. He subsequently attended Garrison High School in Garrison, Texas.

== Start of career ==
After graduating from high school and teaching school in Timpson to earn tuition, in 1913 Peddy began attendance at the University of Texas at Austin. He remained for a year and afterwards resumed working on the family farm. In 1916, Peddy was elected to the Texas House of Representatives, and he served from January to September 1917.

Peddy also returned to the University of Texas, and in 1917 he was elected as student body president. He decided to obtain military training in anticipation of World War I and took part in the Citizens' Military Training Camp held at Camp Funston (later Camp Bullis), Leon Springs, Texas.

In October 1917, Peddy joined the United States Army and received his commission as a captain of Infantry. Peddy was assigned to the 163rd Infantry Regiment, a unit of the 41st Division. He served in France throughout the war, and later commanded Company K, 360th Infantry Regiment, a unit of the 90th Division. He remained with the Army during its post-war occupation of Germany and returned to the United States in the spring of 1919.

== Continued career ==
After his military service, Peddy returned to college, this time attending courses at the University of Texas School of Law. He received his LL.B. degree in 1920, and was admitted to the bar later that year. He practiced law in Houston in partnership with David Andrew Simmons and Dan Jackson. He subsequently accepted a position as an assistant district attorney for Harris County, where he served for two years. He then spent two years as an Assistant United States Attorney for the Southern District of Texas, where he had responsibility for mail fraud prosecutions.

== 1922 U.S. Senate campaign ==
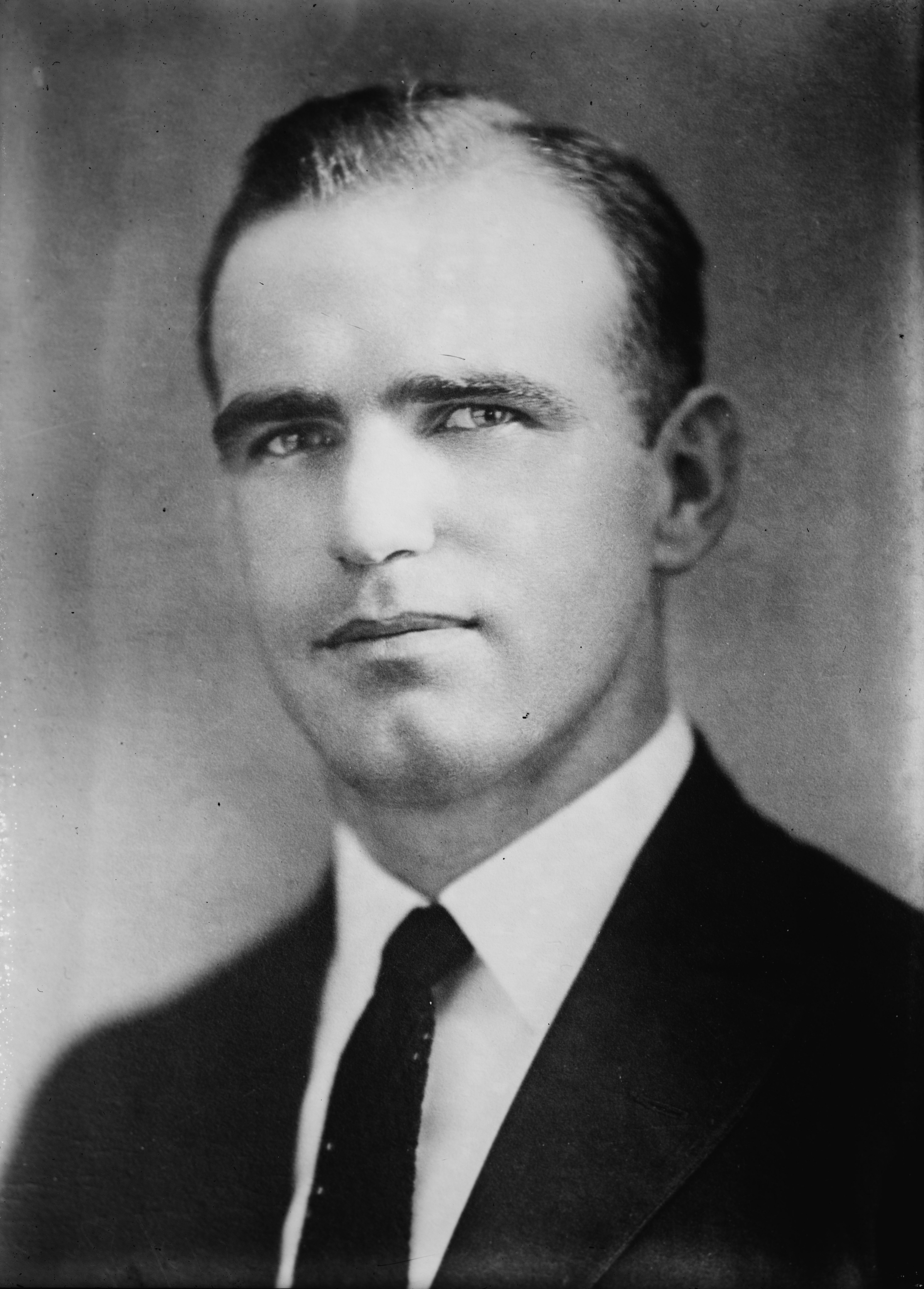
Bain News Service photo, circa 1922

In 1922, Earle Bradford Mayfield, a member of the Texas Railroad Commission defeated James E. Ferguson, a former governor of Texas for the Democratic U.S. Senate nomination, then tantamount to election in Texas as a legacy of the American Civil War. Mayfield had the support of the resurgent Ku Klux Klan, and anti-Klan activists in the Democratic Party including Peddy were unable to have him stripped of the nomination. Peddy agreed to run against him as the candidate of the "Independent Democrats", members of the party who opposed the Klan. The Texas Republican Party also backed Peddy, but was unable to have him included on the general election ballot as their official nominee. He then ran a write-in campaign as the candidate of the Independent Democrats and Republicans. In the general election, Peddy ran a surprisingly strong race and held Mayfield to a smaller margin than was usual for Texas Democrats, but Mayfield defeated him 264,260 votes (66.9%) to 130,744 (33.1%). Peddy challenged Mayfield's election, and the subsequent Senate investigation prevented Mayfield from taking his seat as scheduled on March 4, 1923. Peddy's challenge was denied later that year, and Mayfield assumed his seat on December 3, 1923.

== Later career ==
In 1925, Peddy joined the Houston law firm of Vinson, Elkins, Weems, and Francis (now Vinson & Elkins). He became a partner in 1929, and specialized in corporate law. Peddy remained with the firm until leaving to join the military for World War II in 1942. Commissioned as a major, he served in Dallas as a member of the Eighth Service Command, where he recruited individuals to join the Army so they could become qualified in the Civil Affairs field and take part in rebuilding activities in Europe after their training.

Peddy later served on the staff of the 5th Infantry Division, a unit of Third U.S. Army. He landed in Normandy in July 1944 and served in Europe until the end of the war. He attained the rank of lieutenant colonel as a Civil Affairs officer, and his assignments included serving as deputy military governor of Frankfurt, Germany after the war ended in 1945. Peddy's achievements were recognized with award of the Bronze Star Medal and Croix de Guerre.

After returning to the United States, Peddy was not invited to rejoin Vinson & Elkins as a partner. He declined the firm's offer of a salaried position and established a solo practice in Houston.

== 1948 U.S. Senate campaign ==
In 1948, Peddy entered the Democratic primary for U.S. Senator. Running as an anti-Communist, pro-states' rights conservative, he drew nearly 20 percent of the vote and finished third. Because neither of the top two candidates, Lyndon B. Johnson and Coke Stevenson, obtained a majority, they competed in a runoff. Peddy endorsed Stevenson, who was also a conservative, and most observers assumed that adding Peddy's supporters to Stevenson's would enable Stevenson to defeat the more liberal Johnson. In a runoff that was rife with allegations of fraud, Johnson obtained endorsements from two of Peddy's brothers and made enough gains among former Peddy voters to make the runoff closer than expected. In a controversial result, Johnson was declared the winner by 87 votes. He went on to win the general election, defeating Republican Homa J. Porter.

== Later life ==
After his second Senate campaign, Peddy resumed practicing law in Houston. He died in Houston on June 13, 1951. Peddy was buried at Ramah Cemetery in Tenaha.

== Family ==
In 1921, Peddy married Gertrude Irwin, who served as the private secretary for Vinson & Elkins partner James A. Elkins. They remained married until Peddy's death, and had no children. The Peddys raised two of Mrs. Peddy's nephews as their foster children.

== Legacy ==
In 2016, the University of Texas at Austin completed cataloguing Peddy's papers, including letters to his wife that detailed his wartime experiences. The Peddy Papers are part of the Dolph Briscoe Center for American History and are available to the public.

Party political offices
Preceded by Alex W. Atcheson	Republican nominee for U.S. Senator from Texas (Class 1); Endorsed; 1922	Succeeded by T. M. Kennerly
