= 1954 United States Senate election in Texas =

- November 2, 1954
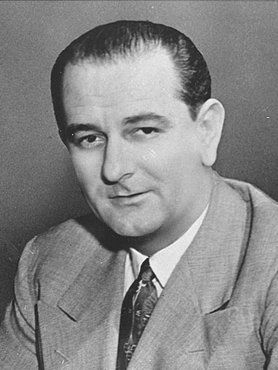

Nominee	Lyndon B. Johnson	Carlos Watson
Party	Democratic	Republican
Popular vote	538,417	95,033
Percentage	84.59%	14.93%
- County results Johnson: 50–60% 60–70% 70–80% 80–90% >90% Watson: 80–90%
U.S. senator before election
Lyndon B. Johnson
Democratic
Elected U.S. Senator
Lyndon B. Johnson
Democratic

The 1954 United States Senate election in Texas was held on November 2, 1954. Incumbent Democratic U.S. Senator Lyndon Baines Johnson was re-elected to a second term in office, easily dispatching his challengers.

== Democratic primary ==
=== Candidates ===
- Dudley Dougherty, State Representative from Beeville
- Lyndon Baines Johnson, incumbent Senator since 1949

=== Results ===
Primary results Johnson: 50–60% 60–70% 70–80% 80–90% Dougherty: 50–60% 60–70% 80–90%

1954 United States Senate election in Texas
Party	Candidate	Votes	%
Democratic	Lyndon B. Johnson (incumbent)	883,264	71.38%
Democratic	Dudley Dougherty	354,188	28.62%
Total votes		1,237,452	100.00%

== General election ==
=== Results ===
1954 United States Senate election in Texas
Party	Candidate	Votes	%
Democratic	Lyndon B. Johnson (incumbent)	538,417	84.59%
Republican	Carlos G. Watson	95,033	14.93%
Constitution	Fred T. Spangler	3,025	0.48%
Total votes		636,475	100.00%
Democratic hold			

== See also ==
- 1954 United States Senate elections
