= 1922 United States Senate election in Texas =

- November 7, 1922
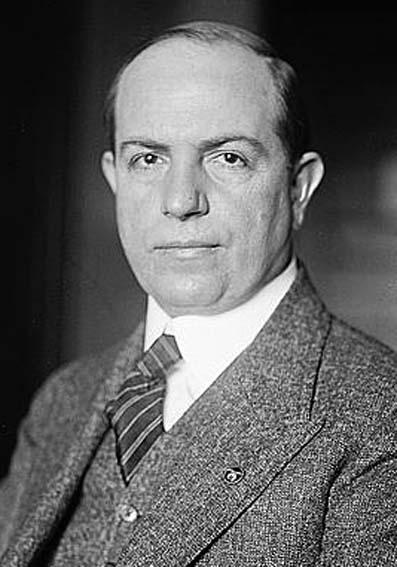

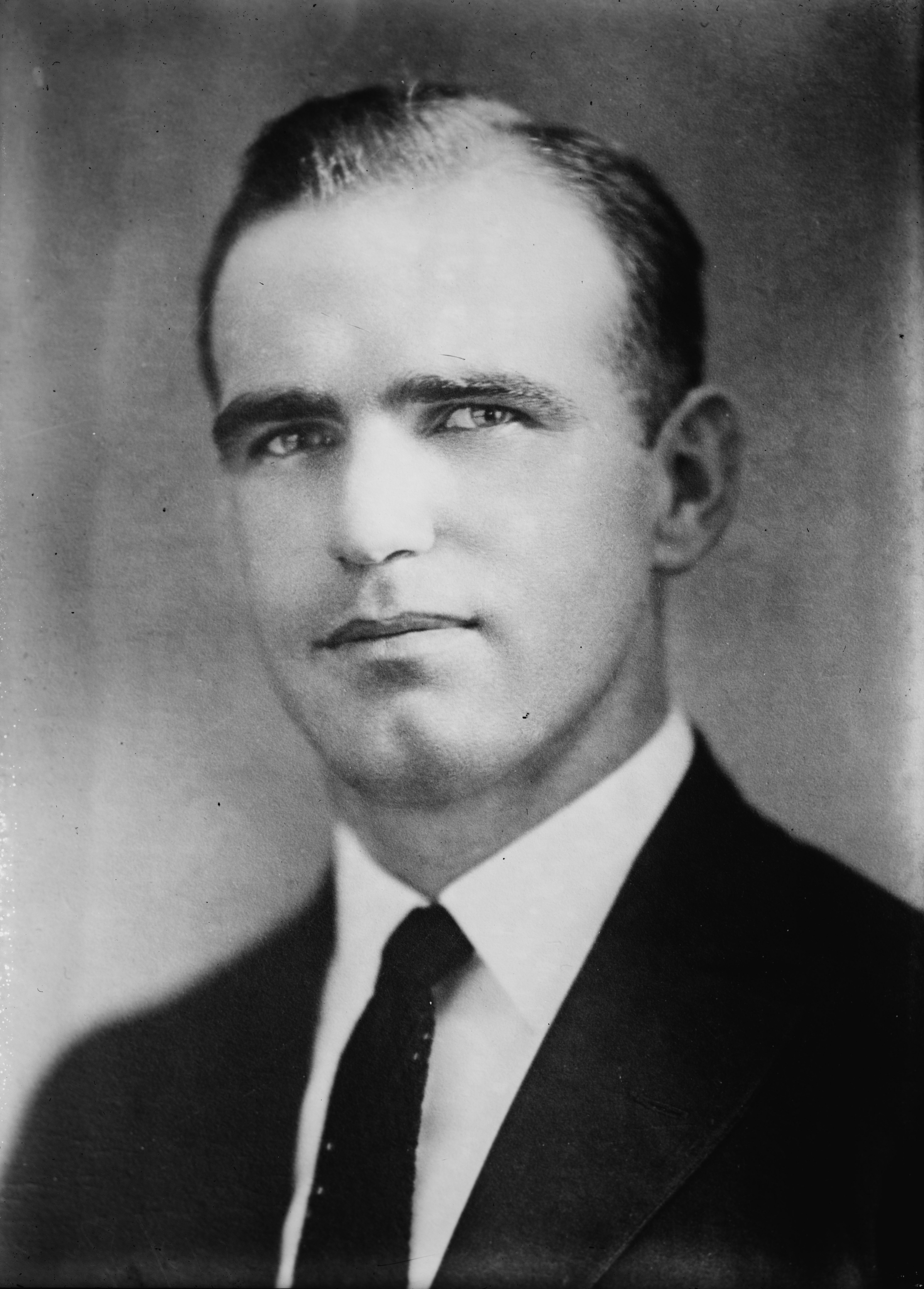
Nominee	Earle Mayfield	George Peddy (write-in)
Party	Democratic	Independent Democratic
Alliance		Republican
Popular vote	264,260	130,744
Percentage	66.90%	33.10%
- County results Mayfield: 50–60% 60–70% 70–80% 80–90% >90% Peddy: 50–60% 60–70% 70–80% 80–90% No votes
U.S. senator before election
Charles Culberson
Democratic
Elected U.S. Senator
Earle Mayfield
Democratic

The 1922 United States Senate election in Texas was held on November 7, 1922. Incumbent Democratic U.S. Senator Charles Culberson ran for re-election to a fifth term, but lost the Democratic primary. A runoff was held between former Governor Pa Ferguson and Railroads Commissioner Earle Bradford Mayfield.

In the runoff, Mayfield, a member of the Texas Railroad Commission defeated Ferguson for the Democratic nomination, then tantamount to election in Texas as a legacy of the American Civil War. Mayfield had the support of the resurgent Ku Klux Klan, and anti-Klan activists in the Democratic Party including George Peddy were unable to have him stripped of the nomination. Peddy agreed to run against Mayfield as the candidate of the "Independent Democrats," members of the party who opposed the Klan. The Texas Republican Party also backed Peddy, but after a lengthy court battle, they were unable to have him included on the general election ballot as their official nominee. Peddy ran on an explicitly anti-Klan platform.

Peddy ran a write-in campaign as the candidate of the Independent Democrats and Republicans. Peddy also ran with the endorsements of Senator Culberson and President Warren G. Harding. In the general election, he ran a surprisingly strong race and held Mayfield to a smaller margin than was usual for Texas Democrats, but Mayfield defeated him 264,260 votes (66.9%) to 130,744 (33.1%). Mayfield performed especially well in cities where the Klan had a strong presence, like Dallas and Houston. Peddy challenged Mayfield's election, and the subsequent Senate investigation prevented Mayfield from taking his seat as scheduled on March 4, 1923. Mayfield assumed his seat on December 3, 1923, and was sworn in pending a resolution to Peddy's challenge, which was ultimately denied on February 4, 1925.

== Democratic primary ==
=== Candidates ===
- Charles Allen Culberson, incumbent U.S. Senator since 1899
- James E. "Pa" Ferguson, former Governor of Texas (1915–17)
- Robert Lee Henry, former U.S. Representative from Waco (1897–1917)
- Earle Bradford Mayfield, member of the Railroad Commission of Texas and former State Senator from Tyler
- Cullen F. Thomas, Dallas attorney
- Charles Ousley

==== Withdrawn ====
- Sterling P. Strong, traveling salesman and former Montague County Clerk

=== Results ===
1922 Democratic U.S. Senate primary
Party	Candidate	Votes	%
Democratic	Earle B. Mayfield	153,538	26.78%
Democratic	Pa Ferguson	127,071	22.16%
Democratic	Charles Culberson (incumbent)	99,635	17.38%
Democratic	Cullen F. Thomas	88,026	15.35%
Democratic	Charles Ousley	62,451	10.89%
Democratic	Robert Lee Henry	41,567	7.25%
Democratic	Sterling P. Strong (withdrew)	1,085	0.19%
Total votes		573,373	100.00%

=== Runoff ===
1922 Democratic U.S. Senate runoff
Party	Candidate	Votes	%
Democratic	Earle B. Mayfield	273,308	54.44%
Democratic	Pa Ferguson	228,701	45.56%
Total votes		502,009	100.00%

== General election ==
=== Results ===
1922 United States Senate election in Texas
Party	Candidate	Votes	%	±%
Democratic	Earle B. Mayfield	264,260	66.90%	▼14.40
Ind. Democratic	George Peddy (write-in)	130,744	33.10%	▲20.01
Total votes		395,004	100.00%	
Democratic hold				

== See also ==
- 1922 United States Senate elections
