= Homa J. Porter =

American businessman and political activist (1896–1986)

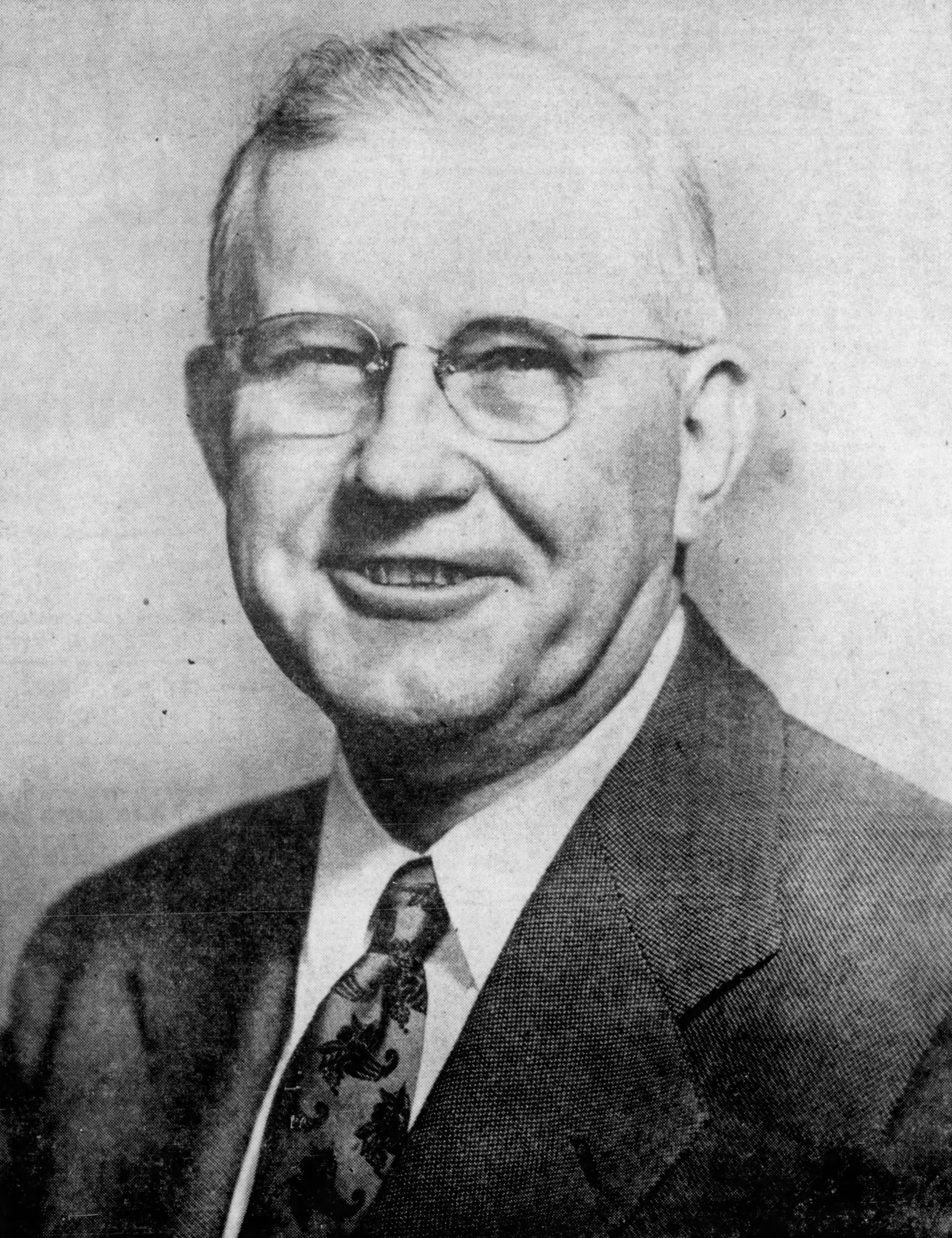
- Porter c. 1948

Member of the Republican National Committee from Texas
- In office August 27, 1952 – February 7, 1960
- Preceded by: Henry Zweifel
- Succeeded by: Albert B. Fay

President of the Texas Independent Producers and Royalty Owners Association
- In office 1946–1948
- Preceded by: None (position created)
- Succeeded by: Guy J. Warren

Personal details
- Born: Homa Jackson Porter; February 21, 1896 Annetta, Texas, U.S.
- Died: December 7, 1986 (aged 90) Houston, Texas, U.S.
- Resting place: Glenwood Cemetery, Houston, Texas, U.S.
- Party: Democratic (before 1940); Republican (from 1940)
- Spouse: Ilona Adelia Campbell (1899–1994)
- Children: 1
- Occupation: Independent oil producer
- Nickname(s): H. J., Jack

Military service
- Allegiance: United States
- Branch/service: United States Army
- Years of service: 1918–1919
- Rank: Private
- Unit: Quartermaster Officers Training School, Camp Johnston, Jacksonville, Florida
- Battles/wars: World War I

Homa Jackson Porter, usually known as H. J. Porter or Jack Porter (February 21, 1896 – December 7, 1986) was an American businessman and political activist. A key figure in building a competitive Republican Party in his home state of Texas after a century of dominance by the Democratic Party, Porter was best known as future president Lyndon Johnson's general election opponent in the 1948 contest for a seat in the United States Senate.

== Early life ==
Porter was born in Annetta, Texas on February 21, 1896, the last of seven children born to James Ewing Porter and Isabella Lavonia (Turner) Porter. He was raised on his family's cotton and corn farm and in Weatherford, Texas. He worked as a road master's clerk for the Texas and Pacific Railway while attending high school, after graduating he was employed at the Byars State Bank of Byars, Oklahoma, which was owned by a relative.

Porter served as a private in the United States Army during World War I, and was assigned to clerical duties at the Quartermaster Officers Training School at Camp Johnston in Jacksonville, Florida (now Naval Air Station Jacksonville). After returning home he worked in real estate and automobile sales in Purcell, Oklahoma, then decided to pursue a career in the petroleum business. Porter moved back to Texas to speculate in land, mineral rights, and test wells for oil drilling, and found success as an independent oil producer.

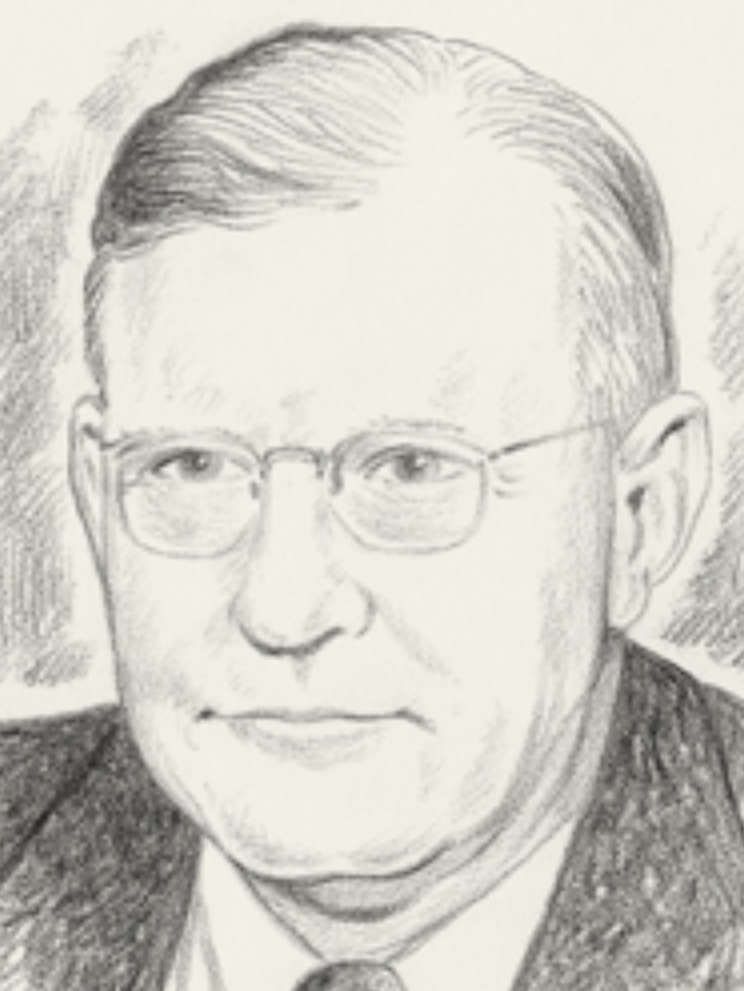
Porter as TIPRO president

Beginning in the 1920s, Porter supported conservative Democrats in Texas, which had been a Democratic bastion since the end of the American Civil War. He backed John Nance Garner's vice presidential candidacies on the Franklin D. Roosevelt ticket in 1932 and again in 1936. In 1940, Porter broke with the Democratic Party because he supported Garner for president and opposed a third term for Roosevelt. Porter became a Republican after the 1940 election, and began a long term effort to construct a competitive Republican Party in Texas. In the mid 1940s, he founded a lobbying organization for oil speculators, the Texas Independent Producers and Royalty Owners Association (TIPRO), of which he became the first president.

== U.S. Senate candidate ==
With Texas part of the Democratic Party's Solid South since the end of the Reconstruction era in the 1870s, the Democratic nomination for statewide office had long been considered tantamount to election. In 1948, the Democratic nomination for U.S. Senator to succeed the retiring W. Lee O'Daniel was won by Lyndon Johnson, who defeated the more conservative Coke Stevenson by less than 100 votes in a bitter runoff election that included allegations of fraud.

Carlos G. Watson initially received the Republican nomination. Watson, a loyal Republican who had run several unsuccessful campaigns for the U.S. House and U.S. Senate as a token candidate so that Democratic nominees would not be unopposed, agreed to step aside in favor of a more viable candidate if one could be found. Sensing an opportunity to make inroads among conservative voters in the wake of both the animosity left over from the Democratic runoff and the Dixiecrat defection from the Democrats because of incumbent Democratic President Harry S. Truman's pro-civil rights stand, Republicans attempted unsuccessfully to recruit two Democrats, former Congressman Martin Dies Jr. and O'Daniel. Porter had already been named to head the Dewey-Warren presidential campaign in Texas, but when both Dies and O'Daniel declined, Porter agreed to make the Senate race. Watson declined the nomination in September, and the state Republican committee then selected Porter as his replacement.

Porter ran an aggressive campaign and attempted to cut into Democratic strength by appealing to conservative voters. Stevenson endorsed Porter in the general election, and Porter espoused a platform that included advocacy of states' rights, the continuation of racial segregation, militant anti-communism, and a pro-business approach to tax and economic policy. In addition, Porter argued that Johnson was corrupt and that the runoff election results were so tainted that if Johnson won the general election, the U.S. Senate might refuse to seat him, depriving Texas of half its representation. Porter also argued that with Truman supposedly sure to lose to Republican Thomas E. Dewey, a Republican U.S. Senator could be more effective than a Democrat.

Johnson defeated Porter in November, but by a narrower margin than Democrats in Texas usually obtained.

== Later life ==
Texas Republicans experienced increased voter support in the years that followed. Porter became a member of the Republican National Committee and provided crucial support to Dwight D. Eisenhower during Eisenhower's presidential candidacy in 1952, enabling him to obtain the Republican nomination over rival Robert A. Taft. Eisenhower carried Texas in 1952 and again in 1956.

In 1957, he defended the Eisenhower's administration decision to dispatch troops to Little Rock.

In 1958, Porter was the subject of controversy when he arranged a $100 per plate fundraiser to aid Republican candidates. His solicitation letter highlighted his closeness with U.S. House minority leader Joseph W. Martin Jr. and suggested that Texans affiliated with the petroleum industry should contribute generously, because with Martin's help Congress could pass an oil and natural gas deregulation bill sponsored by Congressman Oren Harris, which most Texans favored. Porter's letter made it appear that the money raised would be a quid pro quo, which generated nationwide controversy that prevented the bill's passage. The Republican National Committee disavowed knowledge of Porter's fundraiser and refused to accept the $100,000 he collected. Texas Republicans accepted the money and used it to continue efforts to build the party.

In 1960, Democrat John F. Kennedy only narrowly won Texas, despite the presence of Lyndon Johnson on the ticket as his vice presidential running mate. Republican John Tower won the 1961 special election to replace Johnson in the Senate, a further indication that Porter's 1948 candidacy had put Texas Republicans on the road to viability. Porter continued to support Republican candidates in the 1960s and 1970s, including George H. W. Bush's campaigns for the U.S. House and Senate.

Porter was head of the Harris County campaign of Barry Goldwater for president in 1964, and in 1967 the Harris County Republican Party honored Porter as its Man of the Year. In 1968, Porter initially supported Ronald Reagan for president and later gave his support to Richard Nixon.

In 1972, Porter managed the campaign of Henry Grover, the Republican nominee for governor of Texas. Grover lost to Democrat Dolph Briscoe by less than three percentage points (47.8% to 45%), a further indication that Porter's efforts to create a competitive Republican Party in Texas were succeeding.

== Death and burial ==
Porter died in Houston, Texas on December 7, 1986. He was buried at Glenwood Cemetery in Houston.

== Family ==
In 1917, Porter married Ilona Adelia Campbell (1899–1994). They were the parents of a son, James William Porter (1919–2015).

Party political offices
Vacant Title last held by Carlos G. Watson	Republican nominee for U.S. Senator from Texas (Class 2); 1948	Succeeded by Carlos G. Watson
