= Federal-Aid Highway Act of 1973 =

Federal highway legislation

- Long title: An Act to authorize appropriations for the construction of certain highways in accordance with title 23 of the United States Code, and for other purposes.
- Enacted by: the 93rd United States Congress

Citations
- Public law: Pub. L. 93–87
- Statutes at Large: 87 Stat. 250

Legislative history
- Introduced in the Senate as S. 502 by Lloyd Bentson (D‑TX) on January 23, 1973; Committee consideration by Senate Public Works; Passed the Senate on March 15, 1973 (77-5); Passed the House on April 19, 1973; Reported by the joint conference committee on July 27, 1973; agreed to by the Senate on August 1, 1973 (91-5) and by the House on August 3, 1973 (382-34); Signed into law by President Richard Nixon on August 13, 1973

The Federal-Aid Highway Act of 1973 (Public Law 93–87; 87 Stat. 250) is legislation enacted by the United States Congress and signed into law on August 13, 1973, which provided funding for existing interstate and new urban and rural primary and secondary roads in the United States. It also funded a highway safety improvement program, and permitted states for the first time in U.S. history to use Highway Trust Fund money for mass transit.

== Legislative history ==
Beginning in 1964, Congress passed a new highway aid act every two years, authorizing new expenditures and making changes to federal highway policies.

The Federal-Aid Highway Act of 1968 and the Federal-Aid Highway Act of 1970 had authorized states to issue contracts for construction of the Interstate Highway System and urban and rural primary and secondary roads through June 30, 1974. It also provided funds for these contracts. Congress again attempted to pass legislation (the Federal-Aid Highway Act of 1972) in 1972. However, the bill died after a House–Senate conference committee was unable to agree whether to allow Highway Trust Funds to be used for mass transit. Another controversial issue was whether to require the District of Columbia to build the controversial Three Sisters Bridge.

Two important personnel changes occurred in the House after the failure of this legislation. Federal elections for the House and Senate were held in November 1972. First, Democratic Representative William M. Colmer declined to run for office again. He was replaced as chair of the House Rules Committee by the much more liberal Democratic Representative Ray Madden. Second, the death of Democratic Representative Hale Boggs, the House Majority Leader, in a plane crash in Alaska on October 16, 1972, elevated Thomas P. "Tip" O'Neill to that position when the new 93rd Congress convened in January 1973.

=== Congressional action ===
With federal highway aid to the state scheduled to run out on June 30, 1973, work on a new highway bill began almost immediately in the new Congress.

In the Senate, mass transit advocates won a major victory. On March 14, the Senate voted to give states the authority to use up to $850 million of Highway Trust Fund money in both 1973 and 1974 for the expansion or construction of mass transit. The vote was a close 49-to-44. The Senate bill also proposed spending $18 billion on highway and mass transit over three years, and included no money for highway safety or design improvement programs.

There was weaker support for mass transit spending in the House, however. In 1972, Representative Colmer had used his role as chair of the Rules Committee to block any floor amendments aimed at adding mass transit spending to the 1972 highway bill. But Colmer was gone, and Representative Madden was much more willing to allow changes to the bill to be made on the House floor. Few expected transit spending authorization to come from the House Public Works Committee, however. The committee was populated primarily by members of Congress from rural areas who wanted to expend money on highways and were not willing to devote funds to the construction of mass transit (which benefitted only cities). But there was much stronger support for mass transit spending in the House as a whole. Furthermore, the new Majority Leader, Tip O'Neill, was a strong supporter of mass transit, and Speaker of the House Carl Albert was willing to allow floor amendments on mass transit.

To help reduce the chances that members of the full House would drastically amend the legislation, for the first time in years the Public Works Committee voted on major provisions of the highway bill in open public session. Representative Glenn M. Anderson, Democrat from California, offered an amendment in committee to allow cities to use their $700-million per year share of funding for urban highways on mass transit. His motion was defeated. However, Texas Democrat Jim Wright offered an amendment which was successful: Cities awarded urban highway funds could cancel these highways and return the money to the Highway Trust Fund. They could then apply to the United States Treasury for an equal amount in general federal revenues (if available). Wright's amendment also permitted states to cancel non-critical interstate highway projects as well, return the funds, and receive general federal revenues in return.

The Public Works Committee reported its bill on April 5, 1973. The committee bill added 10,000 miles (16,000 km) to the Interstate Highway System. For the first time in many years, the bill did not contain very much language earmarking funds for or requiring states to build specific construction projects. It did contain, however, provisions requiring the Department of Transportation (DOT) to establish a program on highway safety research and design improvement. The total cost of the bill was $25.9 billion over three years.

Anderson submitted his mass transit amendment when the Public Works bill came up on the floor of the full House of Representatives in late April 1973. The House defeated his amendment by just 25 votes.

=== The contentious conference committee ===
A conference committee was appointed by the House and Senate in early June 1973 to reconcile the two pieces of legislation. The committee almost immediately deadlocked over the mass transit issue. Members of the Senate said states should be permitted to make up their own minds about transportation spending, while House members accused the Senate of "raiding" the Highway Trust Fund. While all of the Senate conferees were in favor of using highway funds for mass transit, only two of the nine House members supported this plan. Senate conferees offered a compromise, based on suggestions made by President Richard Nixon and Representative Donald H. Clausen (a Republican from California). Under this scheme, up to 20 percent of the highway trust funds raised by each state could be used either for highways or for mass transit (up to a total national limit of $800 million a year). Another $588 million would be earmarked for spending on urban highways. To pay for the mass transit program, $800 million in spending would be cut from the urban and rural primary and secondary road building program. The House conferees rejected the proposal by a vote of 5-to-4 (with one Democrat voting with the Republicans).

On other issues, the conferees were able to come to agreement much more easily. Although the House bill projected spending of $9 billion a year over three years and the Senate $7 billion a year over three years, but both sides agreed to cut spending down to $5 billion or $6 billion a year over three years. The Senate also agreed to ease requirements that states meet certain civil rights and environmental standards, which would allow a number of highway construction projects which had been held up to move forward.

After two and a half weeks of negotiations, the conference committee was still deadlocked. Pressure was mounting on the House conferees, however. Some states were due to run out of highway construction funds on June 30, and the construction industry was pressing the House conferees to give way on the mass transit issue. Furthermore, the 1973 oil crisis was just beginning, causing a shortage of gasoline in the United States. The gas shortage also put pressure on the House conferees to approve funding for mass transit.

With the conference committee unable to report a bill, the Senate passed a continuing resolution on June 25 which would continue to fund highway construction in 30 states for four more months at 1970 levels. The House was reluctant to agree to such a measure, since it would only lead to higher pressure over time for a compromise on the mass transit issue. But with states running out of money, the House passed by voice vote a $1.5 billion highway aid continuing resolution.

The conference committee reached agreement on the mass transit issue on July 19, 1973. The key negotiators were Representative Jim Wright and Senator Lloyd Bentsen, both of Texas. The conference committee bill allowed states to use up to $200 million of fiscal year 1975's $800 million urban highway appropriation to purchases mass transit buses. In fiscal year 1976, states could divert up to the entire $800 million urban highway appropriation to mass transit (which now included not only buses but also rolling stock as well as rail construction). The conferees also agreed to bar states from canceling sections of their planned interstates to use the money for mass transit. Some issues were still unresolved, however. Conferees had not yet reached agreement on whether states could use highway trust funds for rail operations, whether to give precedence to funding for roads which connected with the interstates, or whether to include a highway safety program in the highway aid bill or pass it as a stand-alone bill. The issue of whether to expand the Interstate Highway System was also outstanding.

A final Federal-Aid Highway Act of 1973 was reported out of conference committee on July 20. The conference committee had met 29 times over two months, an exceptionally high number of meetings and long period of time. On August 1, the Senate approved the conference report by a vote of 95-to-1. The House followed suit by voice vote on August 3.

The highway bill proved acceptable to President Nixon, and he signed the bill into law on August 13, 1973.

== About the act ==
The legislation reauthorized the Federal-Aid Highway Act through the end of fiscal year 1976 (September 30, 1976). Appropriations were made for interstate highway construction through fiscal year 1979 (September 30, 1979).

The total cost of the legislation was $20 billion over fiscal years 1974, 1975, and 1976. The act included the following funding provisions:

- Interstate highway system: $9.75 billion was appropriated for interstate highway construction in fiscal years 1977, 1978, and 1979. Funds for urban interstate construction were permitted to be transferred elsewhere in-state for the construction of non-interstate roads. Interstate highway construction funds were also permitted to be used to construct fringe and corridor parking, preferential bus lanes, or other minor facilities for mass transit on interstates. The law required all interstate construction to be scheduled by July 1, 1974.
- Urban highway construction: $780 million was appropriated in fiscal year 1974, and $800 million per year in fiscal years 1975 and 1976.
- Urban primary and secondary road construction: For urban primary and secondary road construction, $290 million was appropriated in fiscal year 1974, and $300 million per year in fiscal years 1975 and 1976. Priority was given to primary urban roads connecting to interstate highways. No mileage minimums or caps were specified for these connector roads.
- Rural primary road construction: $680 million was appropriated in fiscal year 1974, and $700 million per year in fiscal years 1975 and 1976.
- Rural secondary road construction: $390 million was appropriated in fiscal year 1974, and $400 million per year in fiscal years 1975 and 1976.
- Mass transit: In fiscal year 1974, states may cancel highway construction projects and return the money to the Highway Trust Fund. They may then apply for and receive the same amount in general federal revenues, and expend the money on mass transit. In fiscal year 1975, states may apply to use up to $200 million of the $800 million appropriation for the national urban highway program to purchase buses. In fiscal year 1976, states may apply to use up to all of the $800 million appropriation for the national urban highway program to construction subways, commuter rail, or light rail, or to purchase rolling stock for the same. States must contribute $1 in spending for every $9 of federal money spent. States were permitted to issue contracts for future mass transit capital improvement construction up to $3 billion. (However, there was a carryover of $3.1 billion from the Urban Mass Transportation Act of 1964, so total construction authority was $6.1 billion.)
- Highway safety: For improving railway-road crossings, and for a highway design improvement program within DOT, $455 million was appropriated in fiscal 1974, and $800 million per year in fiscal 1975 and 1976.

New programs established by the act included:

- Highway Safety Improvement: The act provided funding for capital improvements to roads that improved safety, such as guard rails or improved railway-road at-grade crossings. The act also required DOT to establish program of data collection, research, and demonstration programs to improve highway safety by improving highway construction standards. Additionally, DOT was authorized to pay for demonstration projects to determine the effectiveness of road surface marking. Finally, as part of the war on drugs, DOT was required to study the effect of illegal drug use on traffic and driver safety. DOT was also required to study ways in which the mass media could be used to inform the public about the number and severity of highway accidents, and educate them about how to reduce highway accidents.
- Connector roads: A new program permitted states to seek federal funding to build roads (not to exceed 10 miles (16 km) in length) in high-traffic urban areas, so long as these roads connected with the Interstate Highway System. Funding for such roads was limited to $150 million in fiscal years 1974, 1975, and 1976.
- National Scenic Highways: Section 134(a) of the act authorized DOT to conduct a study examining the feasibility of establishing a national scenic highway system.

Specific projects required by the act, although far less numerous than in previous legislation, included:

- $10 million for a high-speed bus transportation program between Washington, D.C., and Dulles International Airport.
- A requirement that the state of Virginia issue a draft environmental impact statement regarding the construction of Interstate 66 by October 1, 1974.
- That the District of Columbia construct the Three Sisters Bridge over the Potomac River.

== Bibliography ==
- Dunn, James A. Driving Forces: The Automobile, Its Enemies, and the Politics of Mobility. Washington, D.C.: Brookings Institution Press, 1998.
- Office of Technology Assessment. Gearing Up for Safety: Motor Carrier Safety in a Competitive Environment. OTA-SET-382. Washington, D.C.: United States Congress, October 1988.
- Ward, John W. and Warren, Christian. Silent Victories: The History and Practice of Public Health in Twentieth-Century America. New York: Oxford University Press, 2007.
