= Sterling P. Strong =

American politician (1862–1936)

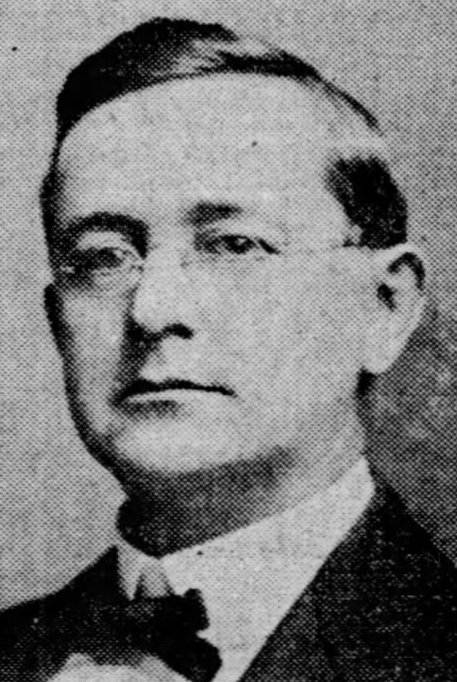

Member of the U.S. House of Representatives from Texas's at-large district
- In office March 4, 1933 – January 3, 1935
- Preceded by: Seat created
- Succeeded by: Seat inactive

Personal details
- Born: Sterling Price Strong; August 17, 1862 Jefferson City, Missouri, US
- Died: March 28, 1936 (aged 73) University Park, Texas, US
- Party: Democratic
- Occupation: Politician

Sterling Price Strong (August 17, 1862 – March 28, 1936) was an American politician. A Democrat, he was a member of the United States House of Representatives from Texas.

== Early life and education ==
Strong was born on August 17, 1862, in Jefferson City, Missouri, to James A. Strong and Minerva J. Strong. In 1871, he relocated to Montague County, Texas, where he was educated at local public schools. In 1884, he graduated from the Eastman Business College.

== Career ==
Strong served as clerk of Montague County from 1884 to 1888 and from 1898 to 1904, and clerk of Hale County, Texas from 1889 to 1892; he was also a clerk for the Texas Senate in 1899. He was a travelling salesman from 1892 to 1898, and later from 1911 to 1932. In 1903, he helped establish the National Bank of Bowie, and from 1908 to 1911, worked as its teller. He joined in the energy industry in 1911, later becoming head of the Garrison Coal and Oil Company.

A Democrat, Strong was part of the Texas State Democratic executive committee from 1900 to 1902. At some point, he was president of the Texas Commission on Law Enforcement. He ran for Lieutenant Governor of Texas in 1930, losing to Edgar E. Witt. He represented Texas's at-large congressional seat from March 4, 1933, to January 3, 1935. He lost the following election to Hatton W. Sumners, as Strong's district was converted to the 5th district in the following Congress.

Politically, Strong was a prohibitionist, having served as a superintendent of the Anti-Saloon League of Texas from 1908 to 1911, and was chairman of the Dallas County division for some time. He supported paying bonuses to veterans of World War I. He was also a member of the Ku Klux Klan.

== Personal life and death ==
In 1908, Strong moved to Dallas. He was married to Alice True Strong, with whom he had five children. He died on March 28, 1936, aged 73, in University Park, likely from a goitre. He is buried at the Old Oak Cliff Cemetery.

U.S. House of Representatives
| Preceded by Seat created | Member of the U.S. House of Representatives from Texas's at-large congressional seat 1933-1935 | Succeeded by Seat inactive |
