= Three Sisters Bridge =

Cancelled bridge over the Potomac River

Coordinates: 38.9039°N 77.0806°W

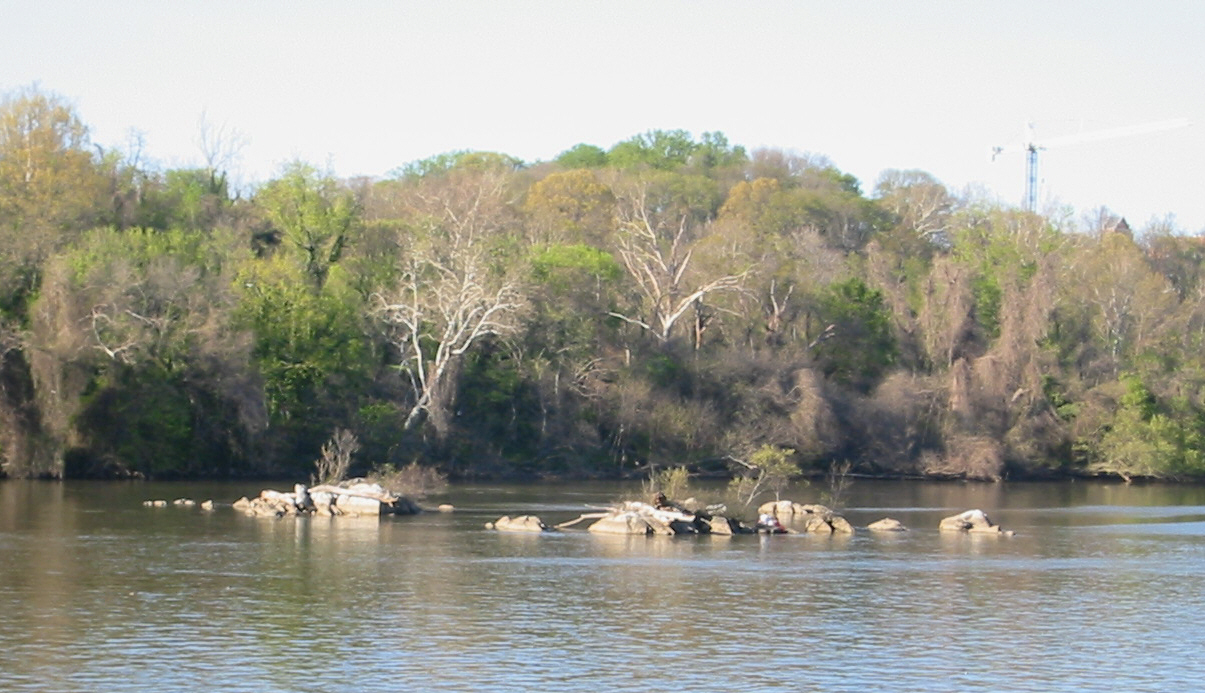
The Three Sisters islets in the Potomac River in Washington, D.C., site of the proposed bridge.

The Three Sisters Bridge was a planned bridge over the Potomac River in Washington, D.C., with piers on the Three Sisters islets. Envisioned in the 1950s and formally proposed in the 1960s, it was cancelled amid protests in the 1970s.

A bridge over the Potomac in the same location was first proposed in 1789, and bridges have been planned every few decades since then. In the 1950s, the creation of the George Washington Memorial Parkway and the extension of the parkway onto the north side of the Potomac River from Chain Bridge to Carderock, Maryland, led to calls to turn Canal Road NW into a highway and to build a bridge over the Three Sisters to link the two sections of parkway. The rationale for a Three Sisters Bridge changed over the years. At one time, the bridge was to be part of the "Inner Loop" system of spoke-and-hub freeways planned for the District of Columbia. At another, it was intended to bring then-unbuilt Interstate 66 into the city.

The bridge proposal proved highly contentious and is a notable example of a "highway revolt". Local residents of the Georgetown neighborhood and the citywide Committee of 100 on the Federal City opposed the bridge. Opponents of superhighways in the District of Columbia also opposed the bridge, as part of their opposition generally to the Inner Loop. Several protests involved civil disobedience, and some were violent. The Three Sisters Bridge spawned numerous lawsuits, one of which reached the Supreme Court of the United States. Representative William Natcher, a strong proponent of the bridge and chair of a key congressional subcommittee, withheld funding from the Washington Metro for six years in order to pressure the city into constructing the bridge. A legislative revolt in the United States House of Representatives in late 1971 released these funds. With Natcher unable to coerce the city, the bridge proposal effectively died. It was removed from federal planning documents in 1977.

== Early bridge proposals ==
A bridge across the Potomac River, using the Three Sisters as part of the supporting piers, was first proposed by Pierre L'Enfant in 1789. It would have connected with an as-then unbuilt 39th Street and run due south across the Potomac.

A bridge was again proposed at the site in 1826, but the plan was defeated after supporters of Chain Bridge (then a toll bridge) opposed it. A bridge at the site was again proposed in 1828. This bridge would have carried a roadway on the upper level and an aqueduct capable of carrying barge traffic on the lower level. This time, however, Georgetown officials asked that the aqueduct be built further downstream. Disagreement over whether the aqueduct should carry a roadway was never resolved. The Aqueduct Bridge was completed in 1843.

In September 1852, determined to get a bridge built at the Three Sisters, Georgetown city officials commissioned a study from engineer Charles Ellet. Ellet proposed a single-span bridge at the Three Sisters whose main arch would be more than 1,000 feet (300 m) long and whose deck would be 60 feet (18 m) above the water. Stone abutments 85 feet (26 m) high on the Georgetown side would arch over the C&O Canal and connect the C&O Canal abutment to the high ground. A single 85-foot (26 m) high stone abutment on the Virginia side would tie the bridge to the palisades there. Although the Mayor of the District of Columbia also supported this plan and legislation was introduced in the United States Congress to give it effect, the bill was not acted on and the bridge never built.

A bridge was planned again in 1856, but debate over its exact location lasted for years. The onset of the American Civil War forced the cancellation of the plan.

On February 28, 1891, the United States Congress enacted a statute that incorporated the Washington and Arlington Railway Company in the District of Columbia, with authorization to reach Fort Myer and the northwest entrance of Arlington National Cemetery by crossing the Potomac River on a new bridge that the company would construct at or near the Three Sisters. The bridge was not built.

=== Proposed George Washington Memorial Parkway bridge ===
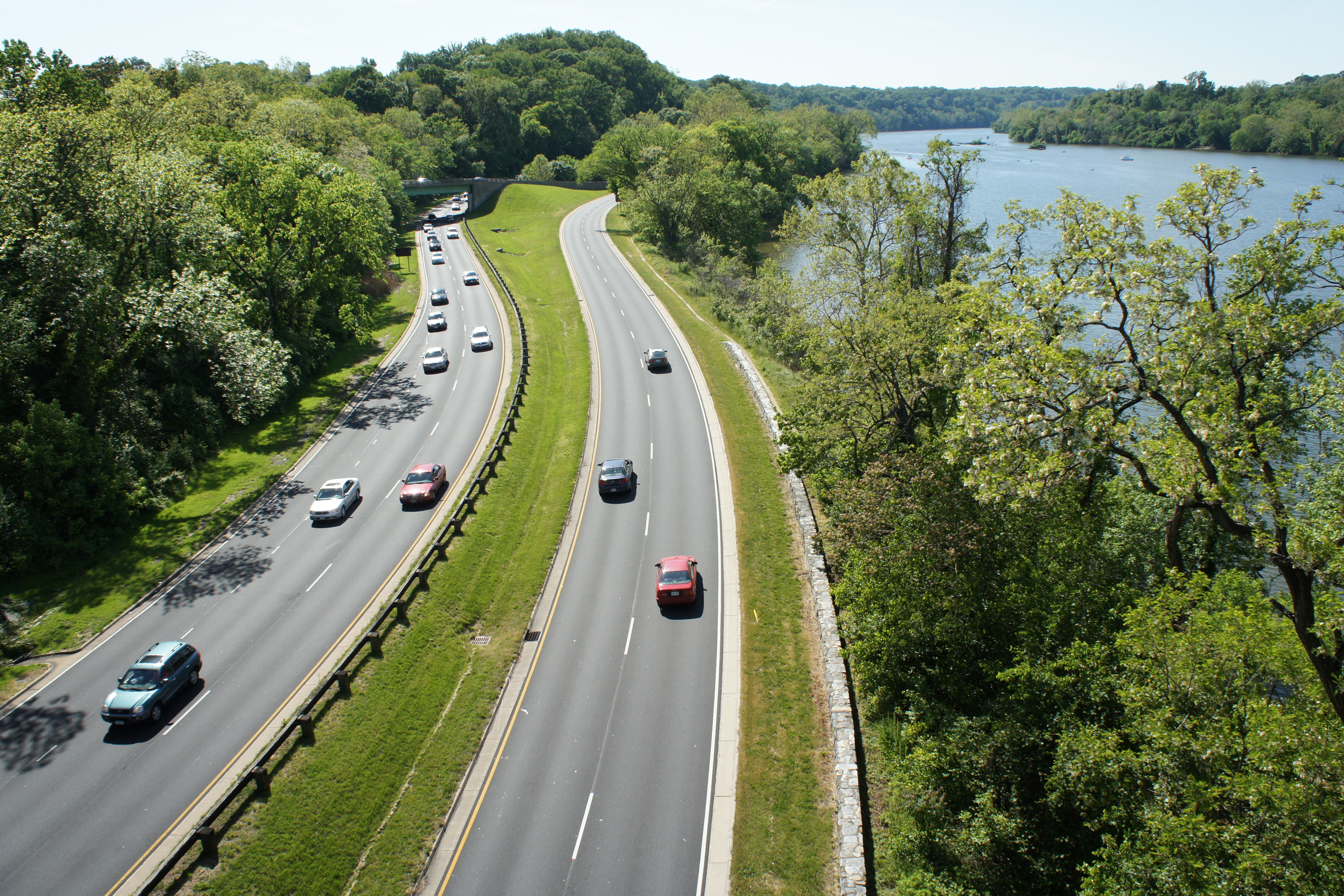
The George Washington Memorial Parkway near Rosslyn, Virginia. The Three Sisters can be seen in the Potomac River, right.

In 1928, Congress authorized the construction of a parkway from Mount Vernon, Virginia, to Arlington Memorial Bridge in Arlington County, Virginia. The parkway was named the Mount Vernon Memorial Parkway. The following year, the highway was renamed the George Washington Memorial Parkway by Congress, which authorized its extension to the Great Falls of the Potomac.

A bridge was part of the 1929 parkway expansion. The idea for an enlarged parkway honoring George Washington came from Representative Louis C. Cramton, who introduced legislation in January 1929 to construct a larger system of roads and parks in the D.C. metropolitan area. In the Senate, the bill was amended by Carter Glass to include a bridge across the Potomac at the Great Falls of the Potomac. Congress enacted the "Act of May 29, 1930" (46 Stat. 482) — more commonly known as the Capper-Cramton Act — to establish the George Washington Memorial Parkway. The act appropriated $13.5 million to acquire land and build a parkway on the Virginia shoreline from Mount Vernon to the Great Falls of the Potomac (excluding the city of Alexandria), and to build a parkway on the Maryland shoreline from Fort Washington, Maryland, to the Great Falls of the Potomac (excluding the District of Columbia). (This section is now known as the Clara Barton Parkway.) The bridge across the Potomac at or near the Great Falls was included in the final bill.

Construction work on the George Washington Memorial Parkway was fitful, and the bridge was eventually cancelled. Construction began in the 1940s and continued into the 1960s. The Capper-Cramton Act received amendments in 1946, 1952, and 1958, both funding and terminating portions of the unbuilt parkway. The most significant changes came when Congress declined to fund construction of the segments from Fort Washington to the District of Columbia, from I-495 in Virginia to the Great Falls, and from MacArthur Boulevard/Carderock north to the Great Falls. Opposition to these segments emerged from the Izaak Walton League, the Wilderness Society, and other groups, which argued that the environmental damage caused by these segments would be too severe to justify their construction. (The portion of the parkway on the north shore of the Potomac would not be renamed the Clara Barton Parkway until 1989.)

== Proposing the bridge ==
During World War II, the population of the District of Columbia rose by about 30 percent to 861,000 people. The terrible overcrowding and traffic jams in the city convinced many that not only was a subway system needed, but that vastly enlarged and improved highways were required as well. Post-war projections showed D.C. losing population to the suburbs, and planning for nuclear war emphasized moving many federal agencies into the suburbs as a means of reducing the government's vulnerability to attack. These and other factors meant that new superhighways would be needed to bring workers into town to work, and to move them from agency to agency throughout the day quickly and efficiently.

In 1946, a consultant's study laid out a plan for a hub-spoke-and-wheel system of limited access highways for the D.C. metropolitan region, centered on the White House. The plan received support from prominent architects like Louis Justement and urban planners like Harland Bartholomew. Four years later, in 1950, the National Capital Parks and Planning Commission, which had statutory authority to approve planning in the D.C. metro area, issued A Comprehensive Plan for the National Capital and Its Environs. This planning document (written by Bartholomew) incorporated the highways proposed in the 1946 consultant's study. In 1954, the governments of the District of Columbia, Maryland, and Virginia signed an agreement to jointly plan transportation in the region with the National Capital Parks and Planning Commission. In 1955, the District government hired a consultant, De Leuw, Cather & Company, to propose a new highway system in the city. They proposed a vast figure-eight centered within the boundaries of the original Federal City. The De Leuw, Cather study proved highly influential, and was incorporated (in modified form) into the plans of the intergovernmental regional planning effort. In 1957, Senator Clifford P. Case introduced legislation that would require the District of Columbia to build a bridge across the Three Sisters connecting D.C. and Virginia. No action was taken by Congress at that time to approve the bridge. The intergovernmental study, the Mass Transportation Survey, was released in 1959. This study proposed the Inner Loop system of hub-spoke-and-wheel highways in Washington, D.C., largely based on the original 1946 consultant's report. As part of the Inner Loop, a new bridge over the Potomac River at the Three Sisters was proposed to link the proposed "Outer Inner Loop" in D.C. with a new superhighway (which would later be signed Interstate 66).

In 1960, the D.C. Highway Department issued a six-year capital improvement plan which formally proposed a "Three Sisters Bridge" as part of its interstate highway plans. City highway planners wished to redesignate the existing Whitehurst Freeway as the Potomac River Freeway, and extend this freeway on top of Canal Road NW to the Georgetown Reservoir, where it would connect to the George Washington Memorial Parkway. A proposed spur of the Potomac River Freeway, designated Interstate 266, would begin at the junction of the Potomac River Freeway and Foxhall Road NW, and be carried over the Three Sisters Bridge to Virginia. There it would connect (via an as-yet undefined route) with Interstate 66.

== Controversy over the bridge ==
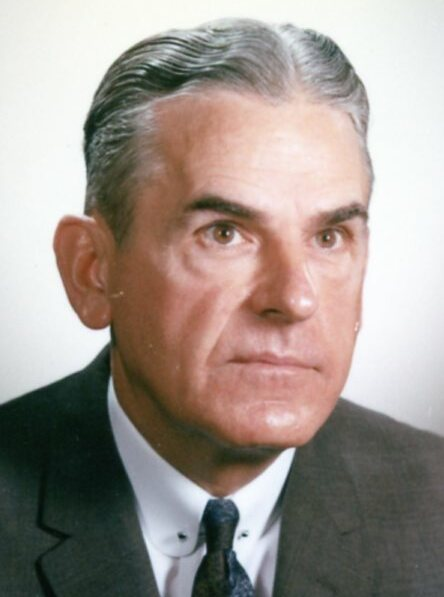
Rep. William Natcher, who repeatedly held up Metro funding to win construction of the Three Sisters Bridge.

In mid-1961, the D.C. Department of Highways and Traffic proposed that the Three Sisters Bridge be a six-lane, 160-foot (49 m) wide structure. Construction of the bridge would also have required that Congress fund construction of the proposed Potomac River Freeway. The City Commission of the District of Columbia held public hearings about the bridge's location and design in November 1961 and November 1964, at which time other appointed D.C. officials, Arlington County elected officials, and citizens of both jurisdictions overwhelmingly opposed the bridge. Critiques of the data and analysis used for highway planning by city officials was so strong that the National Capital Parks and Planning Commission deleted the bridge from its regional transportation policy plan on March 24, 1966.

Worried about the criticism, Congress passed the National Capital Transportation Act of 1960, which established the National Capital Transportation Agency (NCTA) to plan for both mass transit and new highways in the District of Columbia. The legislation also placed a moratorium on any highway or bridge construction west of 12th Street NW until July 1, 1965.

However, Representative William Natcher, chairman of the Subcommittee on Appropriations for the District of Columbia of the House Committee on Appropriations, was a strong advocate of highway construction. The House Committee on Public Works (many of whose members had close ties to the highway construction industry) supported the Inner Loop and Three Sisters Bridge plan. Natcher wanted extensive public works built in his home district. So Natcher used his position to support highway construction in D.C. to win legislative backing for public works projects back home. Natcher pressed Brigadier General Charles M. Duke, the United States Army Corps of Engineers member of the D.C. city commission to build support for the D.C. highway and bridge program. Duke brokered a deal with the National Park Service in which the Corps agreed to put most roads on the National Mall in tunnels. In return, the park service agreed to support the Three Sisters Bridge. Furthermore, Natcher told Walter McCarter, administrator of the NCTA, that he would withhold all funding for mass transit in the city unless McCarter supported the bridge effort. McCarter quickly voiced his public support. With these two agencies promoting the bridge, the NCPC reversed itself in May 1966.

But on January 1, 1967, the United States Department of Transportation came into being. Its first Secretary, Alan Boyd, was skeptical of the Three Sisters Bridge. Boyd was alarmed that the Inner Loop would largely cut through low-income African American neighborhoods in D.C., and he opposed allowing a superhighway to be constructed through both parkland and a historic neighborhood (especially when local opposition was so strong). Boyd placed the bridge project on hold in May 1967 while he studied its impact. In September 1967, the Department of Transportation representative on the NCPC abstained on a vote on the Three Sisters Bridge—effectively putting the project on hold. President Lyndon B. Johnson reorganized the city commission on June 2, 1967, abolishing the three-member commission and replacing it with an appointed mayor and nine-member commission (without a Corps representative on it). The new city commission voted to oppose the bridge.

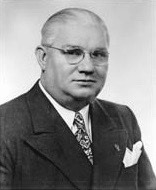
Rep. John Kluczynski worked with Rep. Natcher to build the Three Sisters Bridge.

Several lawsuits were filed by local citizen and environmental groups accusing D.C. and federal highway planning officials of ignoring federal laws which required citizen input into bridge and highway routing and of failing to study the impact of the bridge on the environment and parklands. One of these lawsuits was successful. On February 15, 1968, the United States Court of Appeals for the District of Columbia Circuit held in D.C. Federation of Civic Associations v. Airis, 391 F.2d 478, that the D.C. Department of Highways and Traffic failed to follow federal law in determining the route of highways. Representative John C. Kluczynski, chairman of the Subcommittee on Roads of the House Committee on Public Works and a strong supporter of the highway industry, was angered by the decision. Kluczynski secured passage of an amendment to the Federal-Aid Highway Act of 1968 which required the city to disregard the court's ruling and build the Three Sisters Bridge, Potomac River Freeway, and portions of the Inner Loop. The Senate went along with the bill (although some of its other, more extreme provisions, were eliminated), and President Johnson (unwilling to sacrifice the entire bill to stop the Three Sisters Bridge) signed the legislation in August 1968.

In December 1968, the NCPC released a study showing that construction of the bridge and highways would flood downtown D.C. with so many cars that gridlock would occur. The NCPC voted to remove the Three Sisters Bridge from its regional transportation plan, the D.C. city commission voted to accept the revised NCPC plan days later, and in January 1969 the outgoing Johnson administration deleted plans for the bridge from its highway plan.

Richard M. Nixon was elected president of the United States in November 1968 and took office in January 1969. Nixon was not a supporter of the Washington Metro, and his Secretary of Transportation, John A. Volpe, strongly supported highway construction. But Nixon was committed to D.C. self-government, was alarmed at the city's existing traffic jams (which Metro would help alleviate), and feared that bridge and highway construction would spark rioting by African Americans. But Natcher pledged to delete all funding for Metro if the Three Sisters Bridge was not built. Under pressure from Natcher, the D.C. city council voted on August 9, 1969, to approve the bridge. Four days later, the Federal Highway Administration (FHWA) restored the bridge to its planning documents. Construction contracts for the bridge were awarded on September 17. Opponents of the bridge unsuccessfully filed suit in U.S. District Court to stop construction,

The re-approval of the Three Sisters Bridge led to extensive civil disobedience. Protesters attempted to occupy the Three Sisters islets to prevent construction, and numerous rallies (some with as many as 500 people) were held at the likely construction site to protest the decision. Bridge foes and the city sponsored an unofficial referendum on the project, which was placed on the November 4, 1969, general election ballot. The bridge was opposed by 85 percent of voters in the city. The day before the election, construction trailers at the construction site were firebombed.

== Court challenges ==
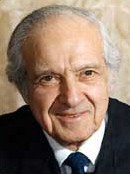
Court of appeals Chief Judge David Bazelon, who voted to uphold the district court in enjoining construction on the Three Sisters Bridge.

Public protests accomplished little, however. The mayor and city council had no real power to stop the bridge, and Natcher and Kluczynski refused to yield.

The Three Sisters Bridge and Inner Loop protests, however, led to the creation and revitalization of numerous neighborhood citizens' groups throughout the city, and these groups undertook several legal challenges to the bridge. Among the first filed in 1969 was a lawsuit which alleged that the Three Sisters Bridge had been sited and designed without following legal requirements for public involvement. On January 12, 1970, however, Judge John J. Sirica of the United States District Court for the District of Columbia ruled that the Federal-Aid Highway Act of 1968 suspended these federal laws when it came to the Three Sisters Bridge. On February 25, 1970, 10 environmental and conservationist groups sued to stop the bridge for violating federal environmental laws.

However, on April 7, a three-judge panel of the United States Court of Appeals for the District of Columbia Circuit ruled that the Federal-Aid Highway Act of 1968 did not free FHWA from holding a design hearing on the Three Sisters Bridge. The court of appeals remanded the case back to Judge Sirica, ordering him to enjoin further construction on the bridge. Sirica declined to do so (as a second trial was due to begin in June on a separate issue), but on August 3, 1970, ordered the foot-dragging city to hold the design hearing.

Meanwhile, a coalition of D.C. civic federations had filed another lawsuit against the bridge, this time alleging that approval for the bridge had been influenced by political pressure and was not the rational, scientific decision required by federal law. Once again, the suit was filed in the District Court for the District of Columbia, and once again Judge Sirica was assigned to the case. The "political pressure" trial opened on June 8. Numerous DOT documents showed the intense political pressure that Natcher and Kluczynski put on FHWA, DOT, and the city to build the bridge, and NCPC and city documents revealed how unnecessary both bodies felt the bridge was. Transportation Secretary Volpe testified in court that political pressure had not entered into DOT's decision to build the bridge, but his claims were contradicted by a letter which President Nixon sent to Representative Natcher in which the threat of Metro defunding was clearly the uppermost factor. D.C. Highways and Traffic director Thomas Airis denied that any political pressure existed. Sirica declined to enjoin the bridge work while he pondered his decision. On August 7, 1970, Sirica held that political pressure was the primary factor in the Three Sisters Bridge approval. He ordered work on the bridge halted within 20 days. The city halted work on the bridge on August 27. By then, construction on the footings was complete, and the piers had risen to just below the surface of the water. The city declined to appeal Judge Sirica's ruling. The federal government appealed his ruling, but the court of appeals upheld Sirica on October 12, 1971.

The bridge design hearing required by Sirica and the court of appeals was set for December 1970. The design was immediately called into question on May 11 when a federal highway engineer raised concerns with the bridge's single-span design, which had been approved in 1967. When the three-day hearing began on December 14, more than 130 witnesses appeared to denounce the bridge. The hearing led to a quick redesign of the bridge by April 1971, so that three spans were used to cross the Potomac River.

== Funding fight in the House of Representatives ==
=== Rising opposition in Maryland and Virginia ===
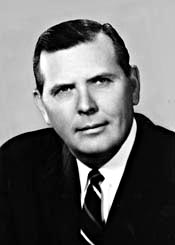
Rep. Joel Broyhill, who became a bridge opponent and helped convince Nixon to oppose Natcher.

As the court cases continued to delay construction of the Three Sisters Bridge, other factors were conspiring to break Natcher's hold over Metro funding and end his primary means of forcing the bridge's construction.

In the summer of 1968, WMATA polling suggested that citizens of Maryland and Virginia strongly supported Metro. After all, these people desperately needed a quick, efficient way of getting to their jobs in the District of Columbia. Eager to find some way to break ground and begin the construction of the subway system, WMATA asked voters in the two states to approve construction bonds for the subway. They overwhelming did so in November 1968, with 72 percent of voters in favor. Natcher also agreed in the fall of 1968 to release funds for architectural plans, engineering design, and land acquisition (but not construction) of Metro, and Metro broke ground in December 1969. But as Natcher continued to withhold construction funds through 1971, citizens of Maryland and Virginia began to think that the money they had invested in Metro would be wasted. Soon, political pressure was building on members of Congress from these two states to stop Natcher and move ahead with Metro.

Opposition to highway construction was also rising in Maryland and Virginia. In Virginia, citizens were beginning to oppose the construction of I-66, and saw the construction of the Three Sisters Bridge as requiring construction of that freeway. Republican Representative Joel Broyhill, a member of the powerful House Ways and Means Committee and vocal advocate against home rule for the District of Columbia, proposed denying D.C. any appropriation in 1971 if it did not build the Three Sisters Bridge. But opponents of the bridge pointed out that Broyhill held land near the bridge which would skyrocket in value if the bridge were built. Scared by a narrow re-election win in 1970 and by the 1971 accusations of impropriety, Broyhill turned against Natcher and demanded that Metro funds be released. In Maryland, too, opposition to construction of the Potomac River Freeway and the Palisades Freeway was quickly building in Montgomery County. Members of the Maryland state legislature from the area denounced the control that congressmen from Illinois and Kentucky had on local affairs. Representative Gilbert Gude and Senator Joseph Tydings also condemned what they saw as "intolerable interference in...local affairs". In September 1971, the Metropolitan Washington Council of Governments asked President Nixon to intervene in the dispute.

=== Rising opposition in the House ===
Other members of Congress were also upset with Natcher's interference. Representative Robert Giaimo of Connecticut also sat on the Subcommittee on Appropriations for the District of Columbia, and was the most senior majority member of the subcommittee behind Natcher. But by spring 1971, Giaimo was angry that Natcher was holding up the desperately needed Metro, and he had increasingly come to believe that Natcher was thwarting the democratically expressed will of the people of the D.C. metropolitan area. Giaimo also may have been frustrated by Natcher's refusal to give up the subcommittee chairmanship to him in 1970. On May 6, 1971, Giaimo moved in a subcommittee hearing to release Metro construction funds. The motion was defeated on a closed-door voice vote. Giaimo — supported by Representative Silvio O. Conte (R), Representative Dave Obey (D), and Representative Louis Stokes (D) — wrote a minority report castigating the subcommittee for not releasing the funds. Giaimo promised a fight in the full committee and on the House floor. Giaimo's floor amendment was defeated, 219 to 170, but the vote was much closer than anticipated.

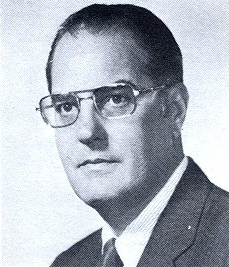
Rep. Robert Giaimo, who led the House revolt against Natcher.

But the issue had come to a head. Metro's funding ran out on August 1, 1971. The Federal-Aid Highway Act of 1970 required D.C. officials to report by December 31, 1970, on the construction status of the Three Sisters Bridge and Inner Loop. Broyhill visited President Nixon on November 18, asking Nixon to make a public statement. Nixon did so the following day, arguing that the city was doing all it could given the legal situation. He also warned Congress that delay threatened to kill the entire subway project and cost the country millions of dollars. Metro had an ally in the White House as well, presidential aide Egil "Bud" Krogh. Krogh enjoyed living in D.C., and was a strong advocate for Metro. Furthermore, Krogh was Deputy Counsel to the President, and Nixon's advisor on and liaison to the District of Columbia. Working with Giaimo, Krogh helped put together a coalition of "liberal Republicans and Democrats, White House loyalists, and the Congressional Black Caucus" to oppose Natcher.

=== Successful vote to release Metro funds ===
The political battle came on December 2, 1971. Nixon asked Republicans (whose 177 votes had defeated Giaimo's Metro funding motion in May) on November 30 to support released of the construction money and to oppose any deal for a qualified release being worked out between Natcher and House Minority Leader Gerald Ford. (Natcher told Ford he would release the Metro funds if the U.S. court of appeals would rehear en banc its October 12 decision.) The Democratic Study Group came out in favor of the Nixon request. Nixon and his staff intensely lobbied Republican members to support Metro, and Nixon sent a personal letter to Speaker of the House Carl Albert. Conte and Giaimo focused on recruiting younger members of the House, who were frustrated at Natcher's stalling, and many friends, spouses, and staff members of Congress also individually lobbied members to win passage of the Giaimo motion.

Seven hours of rancorous debate preceded the voting. George H. Mahon, chair of the full Appropriations Committee, emotionally begged members not to "kick in the teeth of the Appropriations Committee". Silvio Conte replied by asking members if they wished to kick in the teeth of the President. Majority Leader Hale Boggs and Majority Whip Thomas Phillip "Tip" O'Neill, Jr. spoke in favor of the release of money. Natcher excoriated the Judge David L. Bazelon (chief judge of the court of appeals), calling his October 12 decision "the most outrageous opinion ever written by any chief judge".

A "test" vote on the motion failed by voice vote. Conte then rose and told the House that, moments before, the court of appeals had rejected a Department of Justice request to rehear the October 12 decision. Giaimo moved for a vote on the motion. In a voice vote the measure failed. Giaimo moved that a teller vote be held. The combination of presidential pressure and the announcement by the court of appeals changed minds. The Giaimo motion passed 196 to 183, with the support of 71 Republicans (an increase of 24 votes over May). The Washington Post described the vote as "rare and stunning".

The vote released $72 million in Metro construction money immediately. Coupled with federal matching funds and city money, another $212 million in construction money also became available.

== Supreme Court decision and lingering issues ==
=== Supreme Court ruling ===
At the direct order of President Nixon, the Justice Department asked the Supreme Court of the United States to hear its appeal on the Three Sisters Bridge case on January 17, 1972. However, the Supreme Court declined certiorari (to hear the case) on March 27, 1972, leaving the court of appeals' ruling intact.

The Supreme Court's brief decision to not take up D.C. Federation of Civic Associations v. Volpe, 459 F.2d 1231 (D.C. Cir.), supp. op., 459 F.2d 1263 (D.C. Cir. 1971), cert. den'd, 405 U.S. 1030 (1972), is a notorious one. Chief Justice Warren E. Burger filed a concurring opinion in which he supported the court's denial of certiorari. Burger noted that Congress had mooted previous court rulings regarding the Three Sisters Bridge. However, he suggested, if Congress wanted to pass legislation removing an issue from the jurisdiction of the federal courts, it was well within its right to do so. Burger's concurrence was widely interpreted as indicating that he was willing to uphold the Nixon-administration supported anti-busing legislation. This legislation would have prevented federal court from ordering desegregation busing as a means of ensuring equal education for minorities. One of the major arguments against Nixon's proposed legislation was that the Supreme Court would not uphold it. But with the D.C. Federation of Civic Associations v. Volpe concurrence, Burger appeared to indicate that the Supreme Court would support Nixon. Burger quickly amended his concurrence — an extremely rare event — to add the words "in this respect" to the final sentence of his concurrence. He thereby made it clear that he believed Congress should only remove the Three Sisters Bridge from the jurisdiction of the courts, not any issue it chose.

=== Lingering issues ===
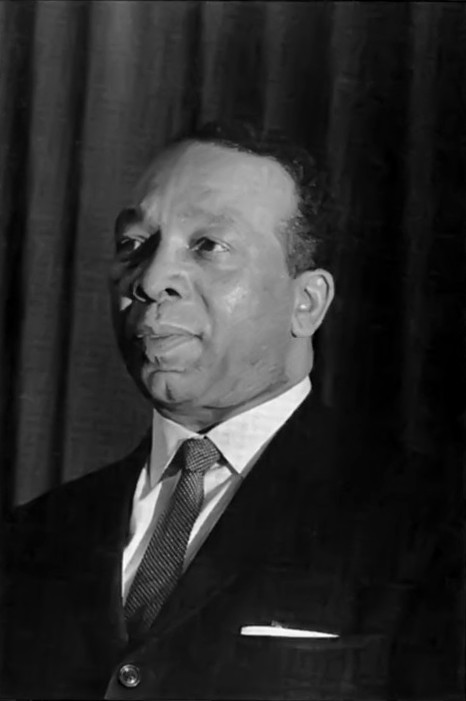
D.C. Mayor Walter Washington, who led the city in quietly cancelling the bridge in the late 1970s.

After the humiliating floor vote on December 2, 1971, Natcher never again threatened to withhold Metro funding in order to win construction of the Three Sisters Bridge.

Some bridge issues continued to linger, however. Construction contracts for the bridge were not formally cancelled until August 1972. One of the contractors sued, and was awarded $350,000 in May 1975 for lost income.

Another attempt to require the city to build the bridge was made in 1972, but failed. The unfinished piers and footings of the Three Sisters Bridge were swept away when Hurricane Agnes struck the District of Columbia on June 21–22, 1972. The House inserted legislation into the Federal Aid Highway Act of 1972, requiring construction of the bridge and that of the rest of the Inner Loop. The legislation proved highly controversial again, however. The bill died after a House–Senate conference committee was unable to agree as to whether the Three Sisters Bridge should be included in the bill. The provision was successfully included in the Federal Aid Highway Act of 1973, however.

But in January 1974, the D.C. City Council voted to shelve the Three Sisters Bridge, the Inner Loops, and all other freeways planned for the District of Columbia. Congress did not act to force the city to build the bridge. In large part, this was because there was no interstate to connect to. The following month, a study by the consulting firm of Howard, Needles, Tammen and Bergendoff for the Virginia Department of Transportation concluded that Three Sisters Bridge was "inextricably linked" to the construction of I-66. However, the study admitted that I-66 could be built without the bridge. But a day later, the U.S. Department of the Interior said that the Three Sisters Bridge would "severely impact" the aesthetic, historic, and recreational values of the area.

The D.C. City Council held hearings in June 1975 intended to lead to a formal withdrawal of the bridge project from the Interstate Highway System. In May 1976, the council made its decision and asked DOT if it could shift the $493 million in federal bridge funding to Metro construction. That summer, Virginia altered the route of I-66 due to opposition from residents of Arlington County. The route made construction of the Three Sisters Bridge moot. Virginia Governor Mills E. Godwin, Jr. agreed that, if DOT approved the route change, he would transfer Virginia's share of the bridge construction funds ($30 million) to Metro construction. The change was approved in July 1976, leaving no funds for the construction of the bridge.

In May 1977, the Department of Transportation permitted the District of Columbia to remove the Three Sisters Bridge from its formal master transportation plan. Noting that the bridge was "killed" yet again, the Washington Post said, "This time it looks unusually permanent."

== See also ==
- List of crossings of the Potomac River

== Bibliography ==
- Berg, Scott W. Grand Avenues: The Story of Pierre Charles L'Enfant, the French Visionary Who Designed Washington, D.C. New York: Vintage Books, 2007.
- Committee on Appropriations. District of Columbia Appropriations, 1970: Hearings. Vol. 2. United States House of Representatives. 91st Cong., 1st sess. Washington, D.C.: U.S. Government Printing Office, 1969.
- Craig, Peter S. "Statement of Peter S. Craig." In District of Columbia Appropriations, 1966. Subcommittee on District of Columbia Appropriations. Committee on Appropriations. U.S. House of Representatives. 89th Cong., 1st sess. Washington, D.C.: Government Printing Office, February 1, 1965.
- Davis, Timothy. "Mount Vernon Memorial Highway: Changing Conceptions of an American Commemorative Landscape." In Places of Commemoration: Search for Identity and Landscape Design. Joachim Wolschke-Bulmahn, ed. Washington, D.C.: Dumbarton Oaks Research Library and Collection, 2001.
- DiMento, Joseph F. and Ellis, Cliff. Changing Lanes: Visions and Histories of Urban Freeways. Cambridge, Mass.: MIT Press, 2013.
- Gillette, Howard. Between Justice and Beauty: Race, Planning, and the Failure of Urban Policy in Washington, D.C. Philadelphia: University of Pennsylvania Press, 2006.
- Schrag, Zachary M. The Great Society Subway: A History of the Washington Metro. Baltimore, Md.: Johns Hopkins University Press, 2006.
- Special Subcommittee on Traffic, Streets, and Highways. Accelerated D.C. Highway Program and One-Way Street Plan: Hearings Before the United States House Committee on the District of Columbia, Special Subcommittee on Traffic, Streets, and Highways. Committee on the District of Columbia. United States House of Representatives. 87th Cong., 2d sess. Washington, D.C.: U.S. Government Printing Office, June 5–6, 1962.
- Subcommittee on District of Columbia Appropriations. District of Columbia Appropriations, 1967. 89th Cong., 2d sess. Committee on Appropriations. United States House of Representatives. Washington, D.C.: U.S. Government Printing Office, 1966.
- Williams, Mathilde D. "The Three Sisters Bridge: A Ghost Span Over the Potomac." Records of the Columbia Historical Society. 69/70 (1969/1970): 489–509.
