= Texas's at-large congressional seat =

Texas's at-large congressional district
- Obsolete district
- Created: 1870; 1910; 1930; 1950; 1960
- Eliminated: 1875; 1919; 1935; 1959; 1967
- Years active: 1873–1875; 1913–1919; 1933–1935; 1953–1959; 1963–1967

Texas has had at-large congressional seats at various times in its history. It was often the case when the state received new congressional seats as a result of reapportionment, that it would have a representative elected from an at-large seat, voted on by all voters in the state. This enabled the legislature, which was dominated by legislators from rural districts, to postpone re-districting that would reduce their power by apportioning districts to recognize the increased population and economic power of the developing major cities.

== History of at-large seats ==
From its admission to the Union in 1845, Texas has had single-member congressional districts; the first congressional delegation consisted of two House members from single-member districts. This remained the case until after the Civil War and Reconstruction. In 1869 Texas was awarded four seats and two more as a result of the 1870 census. In 1870, the two new seats were designated as at-Large and were elected statewide. Each citizen voted for three Members of Congress (one from their district and two statewide). By the elections of 1874, the legislature still delayed redistricting the state into six single-member districts, although the districts were of unequal populations.

The Texas Constitution of 1876 required that the Legislature pass a redistricting plan during the first session after the publication of the decennial national census of the population. But, the Texas legislature, like others across the country, sometimes did not follow through on this obligation. The rural-dominated legislature had little taste for giving up power.

After the 1880 census, Texas had the largest percentage gain in its congressional apportionment, from 6 members to 11. The legislature defined 11 single-member districts for the 1882 elections. When Texas received additional congressional seats as a result of the 1890 census and 1900 census, it quickly accomplished redistricting to have equal populations in single-member districts.

After the 1910 census, Texas received two additional seats. Rather than redistrict, it added these as at-large seats. They remained at-large seats until shortly before the 1918 elections. The legislature decided to redraw the state's 18 districts almost at the end of the decade in an effort to punish Rep. A. Jeff McLemore of Houston, who was a representative for the at-large district, for his opposition to President Woodrow Wilson (a fellow-Democrat) based on Wilson's decision to seek U.S. entry into World War I. McLemore and fellow Houstonians Daniel E. Garrett (also an at-large congressman) and Joe H. Eagle were all drawn into the 8th congressional district.

As Texas received no additional seats until 1931, it had no need to redistrict. In 1931, three more seats were allotted to Texas; the legislature waited until 1933 to redraw the districting plan. "This resulted in the under-representation of the people in those districts where population grew faster than the rest of the state. The failure to redistrict favored the rural areas at the expense of Texas's growing urban centers. The latter's faster population growth meant they deserved additional seats in the state Legislature and the U.S. Congress."

=== Voters amend the Constitution ===
The great imbalance in representation between declining rural populations and growing urban interests that had developed over the decades finally resulted in the voters adopting a state constitutional amendment in 1948 that gave the Legislature a deadline to enact a redistricting plan as specified under the original Constitution. The amendment provided that, if in the first legislative session after the publication of the decennial census of the population a redistricting plan was not adopted, the responsibility passed to a newly formed board, the Legislative Redistricting Board (LRB). The LRB is composed of the Lieutenant Governor, Speaker of the House, Attorney General, Comptroller of Public Accounts, and Commissioner of the General Land Office. "The prospect of the LRB determining district boundaries represented a significant incentive to the Legislature to seriously engage its redistricting obligation, as a LRB-authored plan would diminish significantly lawmakers' control over their own reelection fates."

The next time that Texas received additional seats in Congress was as a result of the 1950 census, in which Texas gained one additional seat. That seat remained at-large throughout the decade; the legislature finally adopted the next redistricting plan in time for the 1958 general election. In 1960, Texas received one more member; again, the state legislature did not redraw the seats. .

=== Equal population—the courts act ===
The Apportionment Clause of Section 2, Article I, of the United States Constitution, together with the amendment to that section made by Section 2 of the Fourteenth Amendment, requires seats in the U.S. House of Representatives to be apportioned among the states according to the "whole number of persons in each State" and to be elected "by the People of the several States." These provisions have been construed by the United States Supreme Court to require not only that congressional seats be divided among the states according to population, but also that congressional districts within a state be drawn according to population.

In the 1964 case of Reynolds v. Sims, the United States Supreme Court determined that the general basis of apportionment should be "one person, one vote." This rule means that electoral districts, within reasonable bounds, must be equal in population according to the most recent census so that each person's vote is equally weighted. This holding was applied explicitly to congressional districts by the Supreme Court in the 1964 case of Wesberry v. Sanders.

In Bush v. Martin, plaintiffs from two congressional districts asserted that, in the round, those in Texas were unconstitutional. The Federal District Court in Houston held Texas' Congressional Districting act to be such and stated that the Texas Legislature must redraw them in compliance with Wesberry v. Sanders. Bush v. Martin, 224 F. Supp. 499 (S.D. Tex. 1963), affirmed, 376 U.S. 222 (1964).

The three-judge Federal District Court found that the population disparity among Texas congressional districts—ranging from 216,371 to 951,527—was "indeed spectacular." It noted that marked under-representation was "not surprisingly" found in metropolitan districts. Although Texas boasted a total of 254 counties, more than half of the population of the state was living in only eighteen counties; fifteen areas in the state qualified for the classification of "metropolitan" according to US Census Bureau standards.

During the 1965 legislative session, the state legislature passed a plan on May 31, 1965, realigning the state's 23 congressional districts into single-member districts. Governor John Connally signed the bill allowing the new districts to take effect for the 1966 elections.

Through most of the 20th century, until after passage of the Voting Rights Act of 1965, another kind of under-representation was enforced in Texas. The Texas legislature passed a poll tax in 1901, which had to be paid by people wanting to register to vote. It was a barrier to voter registration for many minorities and poor whites, as they often had little cash to spend. After this, voter rolls declined dramatically. Another way Texas Democrats kept power was to establish white primaries. In what essentially became a one-party Democratic state after minorities were disenfranchised, Texas said that only whites could vote in primaries - effectively the only competitive races.

== List of members representing the district ==
=== 1873 – 1875 ===
From 1873 to 1875, Texas elected two members at-large, as well as electing others from districts.

	Seat A				Seat B		
Years	Cong ress	Member	Party	Electoral history	Member	Party	Electoral history
March 4, 1873 – March 3, 1875	43rd	Roger Q. Mills (Corsicana)	Democratic	Elected in 1872. Redistricted to the 4th district.	Asa H. Willie (Galveston)	Democratic	Elected in 1872. Retired.

=== 1913 – 1919 ===
Texas re-established an at-large seat in 1913; it elected two members at-large following the 1910 United States census, as well as electing others from districts until 1919.

Years	Cong ress	Seat A			Seat B		
Years	Cong ress	Member	Party	Electoral history	Member	Party	Electoral history
March 4, 1913 – March 3, 1915	63rd	Daniel E. Garrett (Houston)	Democratic	Elected in 1912. Lost renomination.	Hatton W. Sumners (Dallas)	Democratic	Elected in 1912. Re-elected in the 5th district.
March 4, 1915 – March 3, 1917	64th	James H. Davis (Sulphur Springs)	Democratic	Elected in 1914. Lost renomination.	A. Jeff McLemore (Houston)	Democratic	Elected in 1914. Re-elected in 1916. Redistricted to the 8th district and lost renomination.
March 4, 1917 – March 3, 1919	65th	Daniel E. Garrett (Houston)	Democratic	Elected in 1916. Redistricted to the 8th district and retired.	A. Jeff McLemore (Houston)	Democratic	Elected in 1914. Re-elected in 1916. Redistricted to the 8th district and lost renomination.

=== 1933 – 1935 ===
Texas re-established an at-large seat in 1933, electing three members at-large following the 1930 United States census, as well as electing others from districts until 1935.

Years	Cong ress	Seat A			Seat B			Seat C		
Years	Cong ress	Member	Party	Electoral history	Member	Party	Electoral history	Member	Party	Electoral history
March 4, 1933 – January 3, 1935	73rd	Joseph Weldon Bailey Jr. (Dallas)	Democratic	Elected in 1932. Redistricted to the 5th district and retired to run for U.S. Senator.	Sterling P. Strong (Dallas)	Democratic	Elected in 1932. Redistricted to the 5th district and lost renomination.	George B. Terrell (Alto)	Democratic	Elected in 1932. Redistricted to the 7th district and retired.

=== 1953 – 1959 ===
Texas re-established an at-large seat in 1953, electing one member at-large following the 1950 United States census, as well as electing others from districts until 1959.

Years	Cong ress	Member	Party	Electoral history
January 3, 1953 – January 3, 1959	83rd 84th 85th	Martin Dies Jr. (Lufkin)	Democratic	Elected in 1952. Re-elected in 1954. Re-elected in 1956. Retired.

=== 1963 – 1967 ===
Texas re-established an at-large seat in 1963, electing one member at-large following the 1960 United States census, as well as electing others from districts until January 1967, by which time the effects of the Supreme Court judgment banning at-large districts in multi-district states had been applied to the election prior.

Years	Cong ress	Member	Party	Electoral history
January 3, 1963 – January 3, 1967	88th 89th	Joe R. Pool (Dallas)	Democratic	Elected in 1962. Re-elected in 1964. Redistricted to the 3rd district.
