= 1934 United States Senate election in Texas =

1934 United States Senate Democratic primary in Texas
- July 28, 1934
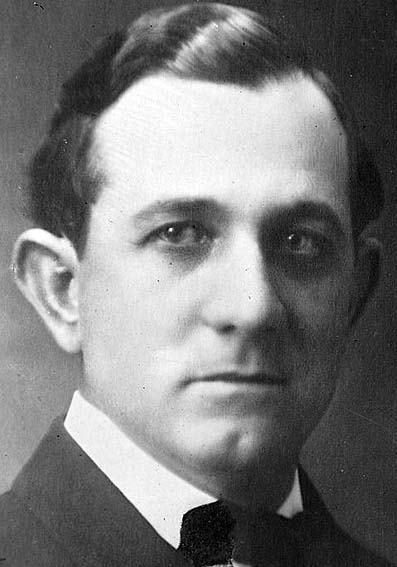

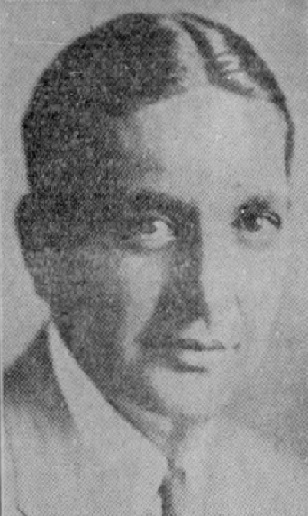
| Nominee | Tom Connally | Joseph W. Bailey |
| Party | Democratic | Democratic |
| Popular vote | 567,139 | 355,963 |
| Percentage | 58.80% | 36.91% |
- County results Connally: 40–50% 50–60% 60–70% 70–80% 80–90% >90% Bailey: 40–50% 50–60% 60–70% 70–80% Fisher: 50–60% 60–70%
U.S. senator before election
Tom Connally
Democratic
Elected U.S. Senator
Tom Connally
Democratic

The 1934 United States Senate election in Texas was held on November 4, 1934. Incumbent Democratic U.S. Senator Tom Connally was re-elected to a second term. Connally fended off a competitive primary challenge from U.S. Representative Joseph Weldon Bailey Jr. on July 28 before facing only nominal opposition in the general election.

The Republican Party, whose support had been devastated by the effects of the Great Depression, did field a candidate (El Paso attorney Ulysses S. Goen) but did not factor in the election.

== Democratic primary ==
=== Candidates ===
- Joseph Weldon Bailey Jr., U.S. Representative from Gainesville (representing Texas at-large) and son of former U.S. Senator Joseph Weldon Bailey
- Tom Connally, incumbent U.S. Senator since 1929
- Guy B. Fisher, attorney and sawmill operator from Bland Lake

=== Results ===
1934 Democratic U.S. Senate primary
| Party | Candidate | Votes | % |
|---|---|---|---|
| Democratic | Tom Connally (incumbent) | 567,139 | 58.80% |
| Democratic | Joseph Weldon Bailey Jr. | 355,963 | 36.91% |
| Democratic | Guy B. Fisher | 41,421 | 4.29% |
| Total votes | | 964,523 | 100.00% |

== General election ==
General election results by county. Connally 60–70% 70–80% 80–90% >90%

Connally won every county in the state with over 64% of the vote.

=== Results ===
1934 United States Senate election in Texas
| Party | Candidate | Votes | % | ±% |
|---|---|---|---|---|
| Democratic | Tom Connally (incumbent) | 439,375 | 96.69% | ▲15.45 |
| Republican | Ulysses S. Goen | 12,895 | 2.84% | ▼15.80 |
| Socialist | William Burr Starr | 1,828 | 0.40% | ▲0.30 |
| Communist | L. C. Keel | 310 | 0.07% | ▲0.05 |
| Total votes | | 454,408 | 100.00% | |
| Democratic hold | | | | |

== See also ==
- 1934 United States Senate elections
