= A. Jeff McLemore =

American politician (1857–1929)

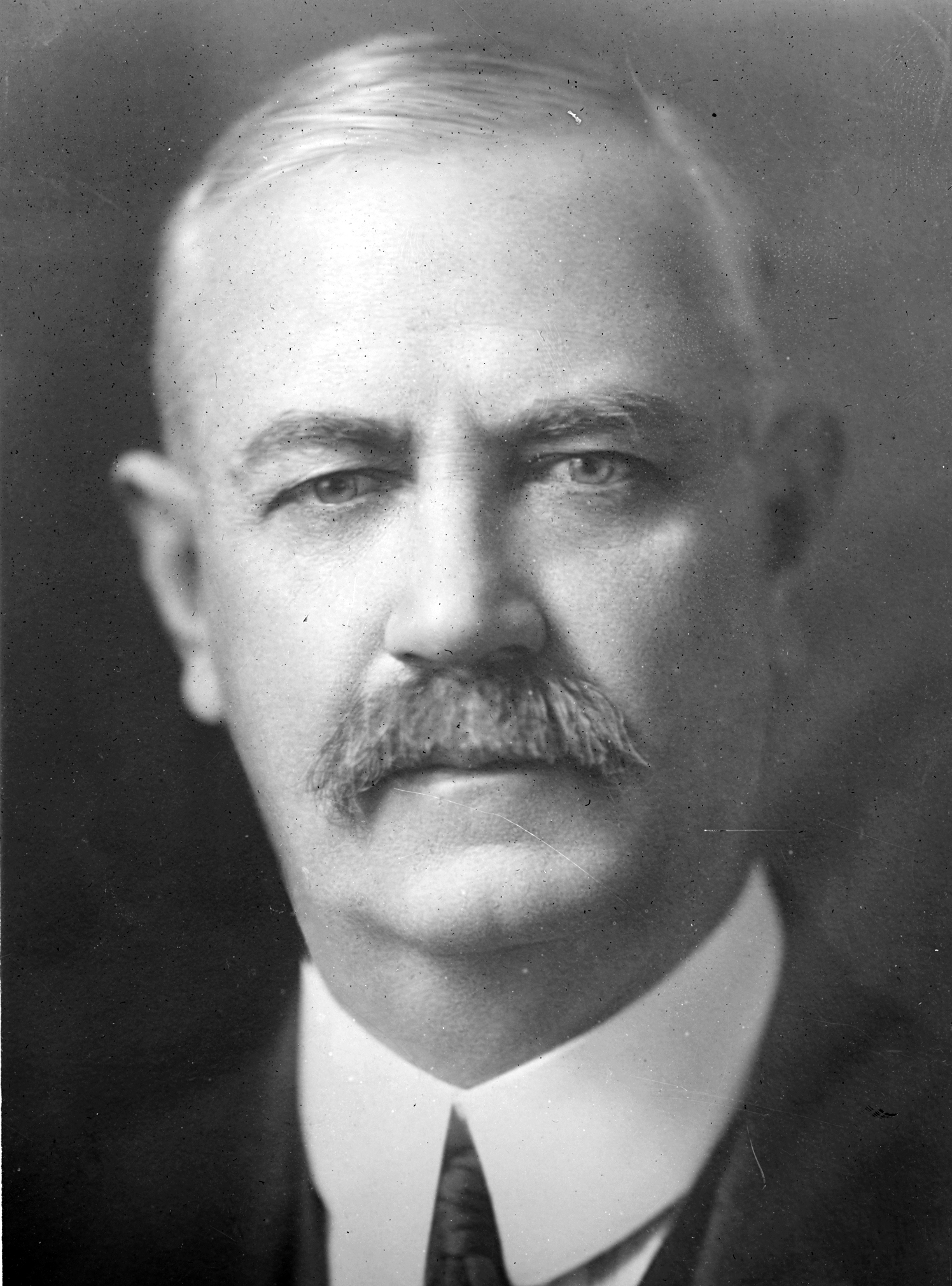

Member of the U.S. House of Representatives from Texas's at-large district
- In office March 4, 1915 – March 3, 1919
- Preceded by: Hatton W. Sumners
- Succeeded by: District dissolved

Member of the Texas House of Representatives
- In office 1892-1896

Personal details
- Born: March 13, 1857 Spring Hill, Tennessee
- Died: March 4, 1929 (aged 71) Laredo, Texas
- Party: Democratic
- Spouse: May Clark

Atkins Jefferson McLemore (March 13, 1857 – March 4, 1929) was an American newspaper publisher, State Representative and United States Representative from Texas.

== Early life ==
McLemore was born on a farm near Spring Hill, Tennessee, on March 13, 1857. He was educated in local schools and by private tutors. McLemore moved to Texas in 1878 and was employed as a cowboy, printer, and newspaper reporter, and later as a miner in Colorado and Mexico. He returned to Texas and settled in San Antonio working primarily in the newspaper business in Kyle, Texas.

== Political career ==
McLemore moved to Corpus Christi in 1889 and established the Gulf News and was elected to the Texas House of Representatives, serving from 1892 to 1896. He later moved to Austin, where he was elected to the Board of Aldermen for one term. McLemore was elected Secretary of the Democratic State executive committee from 1900 to 1904. In 1903, he founded a weekly magazine entitled State Topics, which eventually became Texas Monthly Review and State Topics. McLemore relocated, now to Houston, in 1911, where he again engaged in the newspaper publishing business. In 1915, he was elected as a Democrat to Congress to represent one of the state's two at-large districts. He served two terms, from March 4, 1915, to March 3, 1919. McLemore was an ardent opponent of America's entry into World War I, a position that he believed he held in common with President Woodrow Wilson, who campaigned for reelection on the slogan "He kept us out of war". Less than 90 days after the re-election of Wilson to a second term in 1916, he called on Congress to declare war on Germany. McLemore was one of the 50 representatives who voted against declaring war, the only member of Congress from Texas to do so. When McLemore became a strident opponent of the president, the Democratic-dominated Texas legislature redrew the state's congressional districts to eliminate McLemore's statewide at-large district and drew 18 districts, forcing McLemore into the same district with fellow Houston incumbents Joe H. Eagle and Daniel E. Garrett in the 8th District. Garrett bowed out of the contest, and Eagle defeated McLemore.

== Later life ==
In 1919, McLemore moved from Houston to Hebbronville, and he resumed the newspaper publishing business in South Texas and eventually resided in Laredo. In 1928, McLemore made one more run for public office for an open US Senate seat, but he was defeated by Thomas T. Connally. McLemore died in Laredo on March 4, 1929, the day after he would have taken office if he had won the Senate race. He is interred in Oakwood Cemetery in Austin.

Texas House of Representatives
Preceded by unknown	Member of the Texas House of Representatives from District unknown (Corpus Christi); 1892–1896	Succeeded by unknown
U.S. House of Representatives
Preceded by Hatton W. Sumners	Member of the U.S. House of Representatives from Texas's at-large congressional seat 1915–1919	Succeeded by District abolished
