= Three Sisters (District of Columbia) =

Rocky islands in the Potomac River in Washington, D.C.

Coordinates: 38.9039°N 77.0806°W

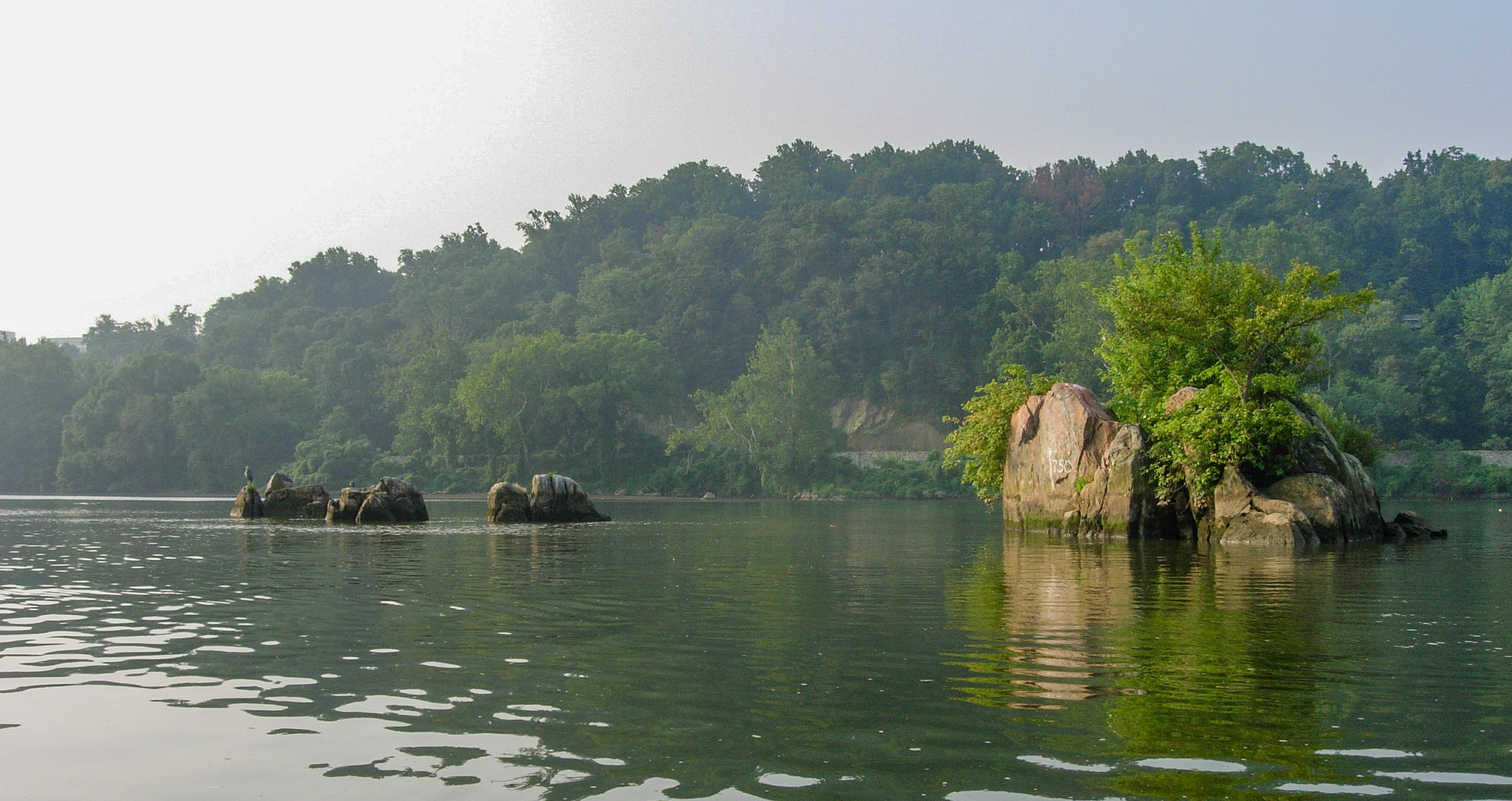
- The Three Sisters Islets
- Interactive map of Three Sisters

Geography
- Location: Potomac River, Washington, D.C.
- Total islands: 3

Administration
- United States

Demographics
- Population: 0

The Three Sisters are three rocky islands in the Potomac River in Washington, D.C., west of the Key Bridge. A notable landmark in colonial times, the islets are less well known as the Three Sisters Islands and Three Sisters Island.

Bridges have been proposed for the Three Sisters several times, most recently in the 1960s, when the Three Sisters Bridge proposal led to a decade of protests and ultimately, its cancellation.

== Geographical description ==
The Three Sisters are part of the Fall Line, a geologic feature which distinguishes the sedimentary coastal plain of the mid-Atlantic region of the United States from the basement rock of the inland. Part of this basement rock, the Three Sisters are composed of granite. Roughly 300,000 years ago, Atlantic Ocean levels were much higher. At that time, the lower Potomac River was submerged beneath the Atlantic Ocean, whose shores reached the Three Sisters.

The Potomac River near Washington, D.C. averages 10–20 feet (3–6 m) deep, except near shore or the Three Sisters. However, there is a deep channel near the Three Sisters that is generally about 80 feet (24 m) deep, but can drop to just 30 feet (9 m) or less during low tide or periods of little precipitation. The rock formation generates sand bars which are often visible at low tide. No grass grows on the sandbars near Three Sisters. They are fully submerged at high tide. The height of the sandbars wax and wane according to floods, spring silt runoff, and drought.

The (traditional) navigational high water mark is Georgetown, which is why the town came to be. Georgetown, which preceded the establishment of the District of Columbia, was the furthest point inland that shipping vessels could reliably reach when coming up from the Atlantic Ocean. The C&O Canal was proposed as a means of navigating inland beyond Georgetown and past the obstructions of Little Falls and Great Falls.

== Legends and history ==
Various legends and historical oral tales are associated with the Three Sisters. One of the earliest stories involves three Algonquian sisters who crossed the river in an attempt to win the release of their brothers, who had been kidnapped by another tribe. They drowned while crossing the river, and were turned into the rocky islets. A less commonly cited legend says three daughters of the local Native American chief were marooned on the islands by their father after rejecting the husbands he picked out for them. The legend holds that the sisters cursed the spot, saying that if they could not cross the Potomac there, no one could. A strange moaning or bell-like sound is said to come from the Potomac River when the curse is about to claim another life.

The first European to see the Three Sisters was Captain John Smith, who sailed up the Potomac River and saw them in 1607. The islets were a landmark in colonial times, and appeared on Pierre L'Enfant's first map of the area.

=== Three Sisters Bridge ===
External image
- Three Sisters Bridge

A bridge across the Potomac River, using the Three Sisters as part of the supporting piers, was first proposed by Pierre L'Enfant in 1789. A bridge was again proposed at the site in 1826, but the plan was defeated after supporters of Chain Bridge (then a toll bridge) opposed it. A bridge was planned again in 1857, but debate over its exact location lasted for years. The onset of the American Civil War forced the cancellation of the plan.

In 1929, the Mount Vernon Memorial Parkway was renamed the George Washington Memorial Parkway by Congress, which authorized its extension to the Great Falls of the Potomac. The idea for a large George Washington Memorial Parkway came from Representative Louis C. Cramton, who introduced legislation in January 1929 to construct a larger system of roads and parks. In the Senate, the bill was amended by Carter Glass to include a bridge across the Potomac at the Great Falls of the Potomac. Congress enacted the "Act of May 29, 1930" (46 Stat. 482) — more commonly known as the Capper-Cramton Act — to establish the George Washington Memorial Parkway. The act appropriated $13.5 million to acquire land and build a parkway on the Virginia shoreline from Mount Vernon to the Great Falls of the Potomac (excluding the city of Alexandria), and to build a parkway on the Maryland shoreline from Fort Washington, Maryland, to the Great Falls of the Potomac (excluding the District of Columbia). (This section is now known as the Clara Barton Parkway.) A bridge across the Potomac at or near the Great Falls was also included in the final bill.

In 1957, Senator Clifford P. Case introduced legislation that would require the District of Columbia to build a bridge across the Three Sisters connecting D.C. and Virginia. In mid-1961, the District of Columbia Department of Transportation proposed constructing a six-lane, 160-foot-wide (49 m) bridge linking the Virginia and D.C. segments of the George Washington Memorial Parkway at the Three Sisters. The bridge was designed to carry the unbuilt Interstate 266, part of the proposed Inner Loop system of beltway superhighways designed for the inner parts of the District of Columbia. Construction of the bridge would also have required that Congress fund construction of the proposed Potomac River Freeway. Over the next 11 years, there would be several lawsuits (most of which were won by opponents of the bridge) and numerous protests — including an attempt to occupy the Three Sisters.

In 1966, Representative William Natcher, chairman of the Subcommittee on Appropriations for the District of Columbia of the House Committee on Appropriations, threatened to withhold money for the construction of the Washington Metro if the bridge were not built. Natcher was a strong advocate of highway construction, and used his subcommittee position to win support for public works projects in his home district; it was the House Public Works Committee which had first approved the bridge. A bitter eight-year political battle occurred, during which Natcher repeatedly deleted money for Metro from the federal budget. Repeatedly District of Columbia and United States Department of Transportation (USDOT) officials would agree to build the bridge, causing the Metro money to be restored, and then reasons for not building the bridge would be found. Finally, in December 1971, Representative Robert Giaimo led a successful revolt on the House floor which restored the Metro funding over Natcher's vehement opposition. Without the threat of losing Metro money, D.C. and USDOT officials quietly deleted the bridge from their construction plans. The bridge project was declared dead by The Washington Post in May 1977.

== In popular culture ==
The islets are integral to the plot of Breena Clarke's best-selling novel River, Cross My Heart, set in the Georgetown neighborhood of Washington, D.C., in 1925. A false legend about the landmark (that three nuns drowned at the Three Sisters, giving the rocks their name) is given in River, Cross My Heart, and also by David Baldacci in his novel The Camel Club.

The islets also appear in Carolivia Herron's 1992 novel Thereafter, Johnnie, and in Margaret Truman's 1995 murder-mystery novel Murder on the Potomac.

== Bibliography ==
- Alexander, John. Ghosts: Washington's Most Famous Ghost Stories. Washington, D.C.: Washingtonian Books, 1975.
- Bahr, Jeff; Taylor, Troy; Coleman, Loren; Moran, Mark; and Sceurman, Mark. Weird Virginia: Your Travel Guide to Virginia's Local Legends and Best Kept Secrets. Sterling, Va.: Sterling Publishing Company, 2007.
- Baldacci, David. The Camel Club. New York: Warner Books, 2005.
- Berg, Scott W. Grand Avenues: The Story of Pierre Charles L'Enfant, the French Visionary Who Designed Washington, D.C. New York: Vintage Books, 2007.
- Clarke, Breena. River, Cross My Heart. Waterville, Me.: Thorndike Press, 2000.
- Cultural Landscape Program. Cultural Landscape Report: Dumbarton Oaks Park, Rock Creek Park. National Capital Region. National Park Service. Washington, D.C.: U.S. Department of the Interior, 2000.
- D'Angelis, Gina. It Happened in Washington, D.C. Guilford, Conn.: TwoDot Press, 2004.
- Davis, Timothy. "Mount Vernon Memorial Highway: Changing Conceptions of an American Commemorative Landscape." In Places of Commemoration: Search for Identity and Landscape Design. Joachim Wolschke-Bulmahn, ed. Washington, D.C.: Dumbarton Oaks Research Library and Collection, 2001.
- DiMento, Joseph F. and Ellis, Cliff. Changing Lanes: Visions and Histories of Urban Freeways. Cambridge, Mass.: MIT Press, 2013.
- Evelyn, Douglas E.; Dickson, Paul; and Ackerman, S.J. On This Spot: Pinpointing the Past in Washington, D.C. Sterling, Va.: Capital Books, 2008.
- Flynn, Kevin C. and Mason, William T. The Freshwater Potomac: Aquatic Communities and Environmental Stresses. Rockville, Md.: Interstate Commission on the Potomac River Basin, 1978.
- Herron, Carolivia. Thereafter, Johnnie. New York: Vintage Books, 1992.
- Jones, L. Rodwell. "Historical Geography." In North America. London: Methuen, 1957.
- Mason, William Thomas. Potomac River Basin Baseline Water Quality Monitoring Network. Water Quality Monitoring Task Group. Interstate Commission on the Potomac River Basin. Bethesda, Md.: Interstate Commission on the Potomac River Basin, 1974.
- McAtee, Waldo Lee. A Sketch of the Natural History of the District of Columbia Together With an Indexed Edition of the U.S. Geological Survey's 1917 Map of Washington and Vicinity. Washington, D.C.: Press of H.L. & J.B. McQueen, 1918.
- Myer, Donald Beekman. Bridges and the City of Washington. Washington, D.C.: U.S. Commission of Fine Arts, 1983.
- Office of Conservation, Interpretation, and Use. Scientific Report No. 4. National Capital Region. National Park Service. Washington, D.C.: U.S. Department of the Interior, 1965.
- Potomac Planning Task Force. The Potomac: A Report on Its Imperiled Future and a Guide for Its Orderly Development. Washington, D.C.: U.S. Government Printing Office, 1967.
- Porterfield, Kitty. "Late to the Line: Starting Sport Competition as an Adult." In Inside Sports. Jay Coakley and Peter Donnelly, eds. New York: Routledge, 1999.
- Schrag, Zachary M. The Great Society Subway: A History of the Washington Metro. Baltimore, Md.: Johns Hopkins University Press, 2006.
- Skinner, Charles M. Myths and Legends of Our Own Land. Fairford, Gloucester, U.K.: Echo Library, 2006.
- Smith, Howard K. Washington, D.C.: The Story of Our Nation's Capital. New York: Random House, 1967.
- Stanton, Richard L. Potomac Journey: Fairfax Stone to Tidewater. Washington, D.C.: Smithsonian Institution Press, 1993.
- Truman, Margaret. Murder on the Potomac. New York: Ballantine Books, 1995.
- Wahll, Andrew J. Braddock Road Chronicles, 1755. Bowie, Md.: Heritage Books, 1999.
- Wennerstrom, Jack. Leaning Sycamores: Natural Worlds of the Upper Potomac. Baltimore, Md.: Johns Hopkins University Press, 1996.
