= Hatton W. Sumners =

American politician (1875–1962)

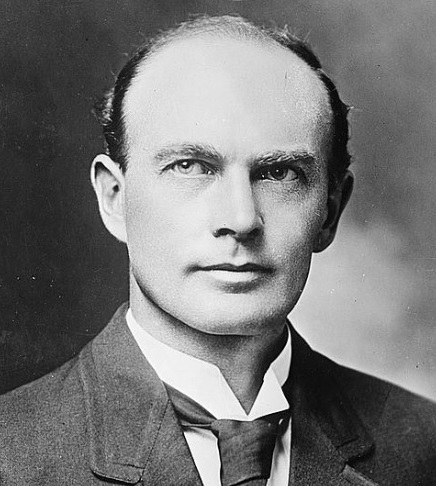
- Bain News Service photo, circa 1915

Member of the U.S. House of Representatives from Texas
- In office March 4, 1913 – January 3, 1947
- Preceded by: new district
- Succeeded by: Joseph Franklin Wilson
- Constituency: At-large (1913–15); 5th district (1915–47)

Personal details
- Born: Hatton William Sumners; May 30, 1875 Fayetteville, Tennessee
- Died: April 19, 1962 (aged 86) Dallas, Texas
- Resting place: Knights of Pythias Cemetery in Garland, Texas
- Party: Democratic
- Profession: Attorney

Hatton William Sumners (May 30, 1875 – April 19, 1962) was an American attorney and politician who served as a Democratic Congressman from the Dallas, Texas, area, serving from 1913 to 1947. He rose to become Chairman of the House Judiciary Committee.

== Early life and career ==
Hatton Sumners, the second of three children of William A. and Anna Elizabeth Walker Sumners, was born near Fayetteville, Tennessee, on May 30, 1875. He grew up on a farm in Lincoln County and attended local schools.

In 1893, he moved to Garland, Texas, near Dallas, at a time when the city was beginning to industrialize and was a booming business center. In 1895, as a 20-year-old newcomer to Dallas County, Sumners persuaded the Dallas City Attorney, Alfred P. Wozencraft, to let him "read law" in his office, a common alternative to law school. Sumners was admitted to the bar in 1897 and commenced practice in Dallas.

=== Prosecuting attorney ===
Sumners was elected as prosecuting attorney of Dallas County in 1900, serving two non-consecutive terms. As prosecutor, he brought charges against gamblers in an attempt to clean up Dallas. As a result of his investigations and his campaign against drinking and vice, Sumners was not re-elected in 1902. He continued his campaign against gambling and voting irregularities in Dallas, ultimately influencing state legislation enacted to reform the system. After that, Sumners was elected Dallas County prosecutor again. Instead of continuing in that position for additional terms, he accepted the presidency of the district and county attorneys' association of Texas in 1906 and 1907, where he campaigned against betting interests.

== Service in Congress ==
Sumners ran for and was elected in 1912 to an at-large seat as a Democrat to the Sixty-third Congress, taking office on March 4, 1913. He was the first of the 132 freshmen congressmen in that Congress to get a bill through the House; the bill made Dallas a port of entry for US Customs. In 1914, he ran for the seat from Texas's 5th congressional district, which included Dallas, Ellis, Rockwall, Hill, and Bosque counties, and he was elected.

Sumners was a lifetime defender of states' rights. He was quoted as saying, "There are but two sorts of government – a government by the people and a government the voice of which comes from the top downward. With us more and more, the voice of the government is spoken in Washington downward to the people. What we need in America is a people conscious of their responsibility, conscious of their power, conscious they are the government and then get on the job."

In the 1920s, Sumners spoke out against the Dyer Anti-Lynching Bill, introduced by a Republican congressman from Saint Louis, Missouri. Sumners said that the bill's sponsors did not have adequate statistics to prove their case (that lynching should be a federal crime), that the bill would increase racial mob violence. Sumners also questioned the constitutionality of the bill and posited the bill ultimately impinged on states' rights. He believed part of the solution to end lynching would start with local sentiment. In his zeal to protect states’ rights he stated the Dyer Anti-Lynching Bill “would mark the greatest advance toward the obliteration of the states as independent governmental agencies which has yet been registered by any expression of legislative or public attitude." He also marked the bill as a direct threat to local and state responsibility stating, “This bill strikes at the very heart of state sovereignty and the sense of local responsibility. When you destroy these, what sort of protection have the people who live in a community,” and “it permits the Federal Government to lay coercive hands on states, and establishes a precedent of sweeping encroachment on states’ rights."

Speaking on the House floor while some African Americans watched from the balcony, Sumners attacked the bill using racial stereotypes: "Only a short time ago... their ancestors roamed the jungles of Africa in absolute savagery…[Y]ou do not know where the beast is among them. Somewhere in that black mass of people is the man who would outrage your wife or your child, and every man who lives in the country knows it."

Sumners served on the Judiciary Committee of the House of Representatives and was appointed regularly to investigate allegations of corruption among federal judges. He served on the impeachment committees for three federal judges: George W. English, Harold Louderback, and Halsted L. Ritter.

In 1924, Sumners became acquainted with U.S. Chief Justice William Howard Taft and worked with him to pass a bill amending the judicial code, also known as the "Judges Bill." Sumners appeared before the Supreme Court several times on behalf of Congress, including for the Pocket Veto Case of 1928, the McCracken Contempt Case of 1934, and the Municipal Bankruptcy Act Case of 1936. Sumners became Chairman of the Judiciary Committee in 1932. In 1934, he drafted a constitution for the Philippines, developing a reputation as an authority on constitutional law. Sumners was responsible for bringing the Federal Reserve Bank to Dallas. As a Democrat, he supported much of President Franklin Roosevelt's New Deal legislation.

He drew the line at Roosevelt's plan to expand the US Supreme Court, after the Court began to rule that key parts of the New Deal were unconstitutional. Roosevelt announced his so-called court-packing plan in 1936. As Chairman of the Judiciary Committee, Sumners discreetly worked in opposition. When the plan's bill was in trouble, Sumners reportedly said, "Boys, here's where I cash in my chips," referring to his waning support for the President. However, some historians claim that Sumners meant he would leverage his relationship with the President in order to, "help straighten things out."

Ultimately, Chairman Sumners came out formally against the Court-packing plan. He and two other Texans, Vice President John Nance Garner and Senator Thomas T. Connally, led the fight against the court plan because they saw the president’s request as a symbolic desire for unlimited power. Sumners, as chairman of the House Judiciary Committee, decided that the reorganization bill would not come up in his committee, because he wanted to avoid it being sent to and passing in the full House. He traveled around the country making speeches about constitutional government. The bill never left his committee.

He faced two serious opponents in the 1938 election, but was re-elected and was not seriously challenged again.

In 1945, Sumners responded strongly to the lynching of Jesse James Payne, a prisoner in custody of Sheriff Lonnie T. Davis in Madison, FL. Sheriff Davis was investigated for any wrongdoing associated with the lynching of Payne. Upon hearing the news, Sumners warned Florida Governor Millard Caldwell, “If these facts are true, or approximately true, this sheriff is not only guilty of a violation of official duty, of a cowardly act, but he is guilty of a direct assault upon the sovereignty of the state.”

Sumners chaired the House Judiciary Committee when the Administrative Procedure Act passed on June 11, 1946. The act governs the way administrative agencies of the federal government may propose and establish regulations and grants the judiciary oversight over all agency actions.

In 1946, Sumners announced he would not seek re-election; he served seventeen consecutive terms.

He was a member of the Miller group, which included members of Congress who were often publicly supportive of New Deal policies, while being privately critical of President Franklin D. Roosevelt.

== War Powers Act of 1941 ==
Sumners introduced the War Powers Act of 1941. This act gave President Roosevelt increased powers to execute World War II in a more efficient manner. This legislation was passed by both houses and signed into law in three days.

== Response to lynchings in Mississippi ==
While Sumners started his time in Congress as a man viewed by some as unconcerned by racial violence, he was outspoken against states and figures he viewed as ineffective in stopping lynching. Less than a decade after he challenged the Dyer Anti-Lynching Bill, Sumners wrote in response to lynchings in Mississippi in 1931, “What we want to do is to have a meeting to oppose lynchings in Mississippi and to see if we can get Mississippi to do something about it, and if we can get other states to become more effective in suppressing lynchings.”

In the wake of the lynchings of Roosevelt Townes and Robert McDaniels in 1937, Sumners was asked to speak about anti-lynching legislation to the Mississippi Council of Southern Women for the Prevention of Lynching, but declined, writing, “It has occurred to me that it would not be good strategy for me to make an address on the subject suggested at the Public Meeting to be held by your Council at Jackson on May 27th. The meeting would be construed as being opposed to anti-lynching legislation; whereas, to be effective it should be a meeting opposed to lynching. This suggestion is very important…everything should indicate that you are trying to stop mob violence and that this is the whole purpose of the meeting.”

In reference to the 1937 lynchings, an outraged Sumners sent the Governor of Mississippi a telegram that stated “If the press reports are even approximately correct, and they seem to be, these lynchings, both with regard to lynchers and the officers involved, were as dastardly a crime as cowardice could devise and brutality execute. It is the sort of thing which makes it hard for us who are trying to protect the governmental sovereignty of the states. It will be effectively seized upon as a demonstration of the ability of states to govern. As one Southern man to another, I hope I will not be considered impertinent by stating candidly my own reaction and that is that the State of Mississippi cannot escape this reflection upon its governmental capacity, in fact cannot escape in effect becoming an accessory after the fact unless it is able to and does bring these lynchers and officers to speedy and adequate punishment.” Sumners called for justice against anyone involved in the now-infamous lynchings including the sheriffs, writing, “The turning over of a prisoner, regardless of the crime charged against him, for execution by some agency other than that provided by the laws of the country is a confession of unfitness to govern.”

== Final years ==
After leaving Congress, Sumners was the Director of Research for the Southwestern Legal Foundation. Sumners formed the Hatton W. Sumners Foundation in 1949, which still awards loans and scholarships to worthy students. The foundation is also a sponsor of the Internet project 'Vote Smart.' Organizations like the YMCA, the Red Cross, and his local church also benefitted from Sumner's generosity.

Sumners received an honorary doctor of laws from Southern Methodist University and the American Bar Association Medal.

=== Death and burial ===
He died on April 19, 1962. After services in the Highland Park Methodist Church in Dallas, he was interred in the Knights of Pythias Cemetery in Garland, Texas.

== Books authored ==
Sumners wrote The Private Citizen and His Democracy in 1959.

== Sources ==
- United States Congress. "Hatton W. Sumners (id: S001072)". Biographical Directory of the United States Congress.
- Old Red Museum, Dallas County Historical Society
- Handbook of Texas Online - SUMNERS, HATTON WILLIAM
- Hatton W. Sumners Foundation Home

U.S. House of Representatives
Preceded by District created	Member of the U.S. House of Representatives from Texas's at-large congressional seat 1913-1915	Succeeded by A. Jeff McLemore
Preceded by James Andrew Beall	Member of the U.S. House of Representatives from Texas's 5th congressional district 1915-1947	Succeeded by Joseph Franklin Wilson
Preceded by George S. Graham	Chairman of the House Judiciary Committee; 1931–1947	Succeeded by Earl C. Michener
