= Joseph Weldon Bailey Jr. =

American politician (1892–1943)

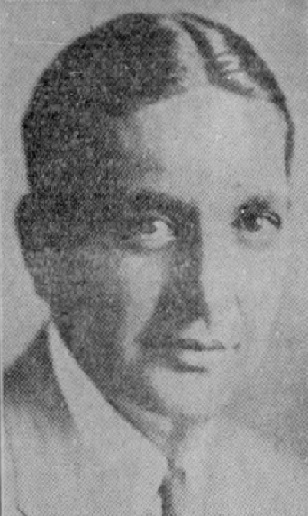

Member of the U.S. House of Representatives from Texas's at-large district
- In office March 4, 1933 – January 3, 1935
- Preceded by: District created
- Succeeded by: George H. Mahon

Personal details
- Born: Joseph Weldon Bailey Jr. December 15, 1892 Gainesville, Texas
- Died: July 17, 1943 (aged 50) Gainesville, Texas
- Resting place: Hillcrest Cemetery, Dallas
- Party: Democratic
- Spouse(s): Ethel Huhn (m. 1917-1921, div.); Electra Waggoner (m. 1924-1925, her death); Roberta Lewis (m. 1929-1943, his death)
- Relations: Joseph Weldon Bailey (father)
- Children: 1
- Education: Princeton University; University of Virginia School of Law
- Profession: Attorney

Military service
- Allegiance: United States
- Branch/service: United States Army; United States Marine Corps
- Years of service: 1917 – 1919 (Army); 1942 – 1943 (Marine Corps)
- Rank: Captain
- Unit: 314th Field Artillery (Army); Judge Advocate Division (Marine Corps)
- Battles/wars: World War I World War II

Joseph Weldon Bailey Jr. (December 15, 1892 – July 17, 1943) was a member of the United States House of Representatives from Texas. His father, Joseph Weldon Bailey, was a member of both houses of the United States Congress.

== Biography ==
Bailey was born in Gainesville, Texas. He attended public schools in Gainesville and then Washington, D.C. He graduated in 1915 from Princeton University and from the University of Virginia School of Law in 1919. He served in the United States Army from 1917 to 1919 during World War I and achieved the rank of first lieutenant as a member of the 314th Field Artillery regiment, a unit of the 80th Division. He was a lawyer, and maintained a private practice

Bailey was elected as a Democrat to the Seventy-third Congress, having served from March 4, 1933, to January 3, 1935. He was not a candidate for renomination in 1934, but was an unsuccessful candidate for the Democratic nomination for the United States Senate, a position that his father had held from 1901 to 1913. He lost in a landslide to Tom Connally.

In 1942, following the outbreak of World War II, Bailey received a commission as a captain in the United States Marine Corps. He died at Camp Howze in Gainesville in 1943 shortly after a car accident. He was originally buried in Fairview Cemetery in Gainesville with his father, but he was moved to Hillcrest Cemetery in Dallas in 1958 at the request of his widow.

U.S. House of Representatives
Preceded by District created	Member of the U.S. House of Representatives from Texas's at-large congressional seat 1933–1935	Succeeded by George H. Mahon
