= Federal-Aid Highway Act of 1968 =

Federal highway legislation

- Long title: An Act to authorize appropriations for the fiscal years 1970 and 1971 for the construction of certain highways in accordance with title 23 of the United States Code, and for other purposes.
- Enacted by: the 90th United States Congress

Citations
- Public law: Pub. L. 90–495
- Statutes at Large: 82 Stat. 815

Legislative history
- Introduced in the Senate as S. 3418 on May 1, 1968; Committee consideration by Senate Public Works; Passed the Senate on July 1, 1968; Passed the House on July 3, 1968; Signed into law by President Lyndon B. Johnson on August 23, 1968

The Federal-Aid Highway Act of 1968 (Public Law 90-495; 82 Stat. 815) is legislation enacted by the United States Congress and signed into law on August 24, 1968, which expanded the Interstate Highway System by 1,500 miles (2,400 km); provided funding for new interstate, primary, and secondary roads in the United States; explicitly applied the environmental protections of the Department of Transportation Act of 1966 to federal highway projects; and applied the Davis–Bacon Act to all highway construction funded by the federal government. It established three new programs: a National Bridge Inspection Program, funding and fair housing standards for those displaced by federally funded highway construction, and a traffic operations study program.

== Legislative history ==
=== Factors leading to the bill ===
The federal law authorizing the construction and funding of the Interstate Highway System did not expire until 1970. However, 1968 was a presidential and congressional election year, and President Lyndon B. Johnson wished to see the Democratically controlled United States Congress pass highway reauthorization legislation that would demonstrate that he and members of his party were governing effectively and able to secure federal dollars for local projects. The bill reauthorizing the Interstate System was drafted by the United States Department of Transportation (USDOT). Federal Highway Administration (FHWA) administrator Lowell K. Bridwell—known to be skeptical of excessive highway construction—heavily lobbied for the bill.

The highway aid bill was subject to a number of pressures. First, President Johnson had frozen $600 million in federal highway funds in January in part to reduce inflationary pressures but in part to appease environmentalists and others opposed to the expansion of the national highway system. Second, a major citizens' revolt against the construction of freeways in and around Washington, D.C., had broken out, and courts had recently ruled against construction of the "Inner Loop" system of spoke-and-hub freeways and the Three Sisters Bridge. Members of Congress on the House Public Works Committee, many of whom had strong ties to the highway construction industry, wanted Congress to legislatively suspend federal environmental and transportation law and require the District of Columbia to build the freeways and bridge.

=== Congressional consideration ===
In the United States House of Representatives, H.R. 16788 was the primary vehicle for the legislation, although numerous other bills were introduced which would cancel or require various projects around the country. Among these was legislation required the District of Columbia to complete its unbuilt Interstate Highway System (the Inner Loop). In June, Representative John C. Kluczynski, chair of the Public Works Subcommittee on Roads, announced his subcommittee was likely to report out legislation requiring that the Three Sisters Bridge be built. His strategy for winning passage of the bill was to add it as an amendment to the Federal-Aid Highway Act reauthorization. Kluczynski's strategy worked: The powerful House Rules Committee approved the highway bill for debate with the Inner Loop and bridge restrictions included.

Consideration of the legislation in the Senate, meanwhile, was far less contentious. Several stand-alone pieces of legislation (S. 3381, S. 2888, S. 3418) were introduced in the United States Senate to advance various highway aid reauthorization schemes. On July 1, the Senate passed a bill that was very much like the administration's proposal, with only minor changes. It provided for a two-year, $11.4 billion reauthorization of the Federal-Aid Highway Act, with $5.5 billion to be spent in 1970 and $5.8 billion in 1971. Only $3.8 billion was new money; the bill carried over $7.6 billion in unspent funds from the Federal-Aid Highway Act of 1966. The expenditures authorized included $3.6 billion in each of the two years for interstate construction, and $1.2 billion in 1970 and $1.4 billion in 1971 for the federal government's primary and secondary road building programs. The Senate bill added an administration-requested program to ease the impact of urban highways by providing funds for the acquisition of rights-of-way so that no development would occur on them. Additionally, funds were provided to assist states in paying homeowners for their land or to help them with relocation costs. Requirements that residents be relocated in decent, safe, and sanitary housing. (Many states had offered relocation only in substandard or environmentally compromised housing, or not at all.) The Senate bill also provided $170 million for implementing the Highway Beautification Act.

The House, however, was in a budget cutting mood. It passed the highway bill on July 3. This legislation eliminated all funding for of the Highway Beautification Act; eliminated the ban on building federally funded highways in parks, wildlife refuges, historic sites, and other protected areas; and banned the executive branch from administratively freezing the expenditure of funds. Additionally, the House bill required that D.C. complete its highway system, added 3,000 miles (4,800 km) to the interstate system, and funded a Maryland proposal to construct a Fort Washington Parkway along the north/eastern shore of the Potomac River from the D.C. boundary south to Fort Washington, Maryland.

=== Conference committee and presidential approval ===
A conference committee was established to reconcile the two bills. One of the main points of contention in the conference committee was the requirement that D.C. build its freeways and bridges. Members of the Senate worried that this would set a precedent in which Congress would become involved in planning the routes of highways and location of bridges throughout the country. Members of the House, however, argued that the United States Constitution gave Congress authority over the District of Columbia, and that city officials were attempting to thwart the will of Congress. Another issue of contention was highway beautification. A favored program of First Lady Lady Bird Johnson, Democrats believed that the funds had been deleted by Republicans as retaliation against the administration. In a compromise, the conference committee restored $25 million in funds, but only for 1970. The conference committee bill was reported back to the Senate and House on July 24. The conference committee agreed to scale back the expansion of the interstate highway system to 1,500 miles (2,400 km) from 3,000 miles (4,800 km). Although it included language explicitly applying the Department of Transportation Act of 1966's environmental, wildlife, and historic site protections to all highways constructed with federal funds, it limited these protections only to publicly owned sites.

The House adopted the conference committee bill on July 26, and the Senate on July 29.

The federal highway aid bill proved contentious. The New York Times noted that the bill was unnecessary, since federal highway legislation was not due to expire until 1972. It declared the bill so flawed that it asked President Johnson to veto it. Walter Washington, mayor-commissioner of the District of Columbia, also asked Johnson to veto the bill. Secretary of the Interior Stewart Udall hinted that he found the relaxation of environmental protections so odious that he, too, would counsel Johnson to veto the bill. The pressure on Johnson was so intense that many observers believed the president would pocket veto the bill.

President Johnson, however, signed the bill into law on August 24, 1968, just hours before a pocket veto would have taken effect.

== Provisions of the act ==
The Federal-Aid Highway Act of 1968 reauthorized the construction of the Interstate Highway System and the federal highway construction aid program through 1974. The 1968 act essentially set the boundaries of the 46,000 mile interstate highway system as it existed in 2011. The act's provisions were so distinctive, transportation policy experts Mark Rose and Raymond Mohl conclude that the act "dramatically altered the highway-building landscape".

The act authorized expenditures of $21.3 billion over two years, and appropriated funds in the following amounts:

- $4 billion in fiscal 1970, 1971, 1972 and 1973 and $2.225 billion in fiscal 1974 for interstate highway construction.
- $1.1 billion in fiscal 1970 and 1971 for primary, secondary, and urban highway construction. Forty-five percent of expenditures would be on primary roads, 30 percent on secondary roads, and 25 percent on urban primary and secondary roads. Another $125 million was authorized out of the Highway Trust Fund for fiscal 1970 and 1971 for construction exclusively of non-urban primary and secondary roads, with 60 percent of the funds going to primary roads and 40 percent for secondary roads.
- $200 million in fiscal 1970 and 1971 for the Traffic Operations Program to Improve Capacity and Safety (TOPICS) program.
- $100 million in fiscal 1970 and 1971 for right-of-way acquisition.
- $75 million in fiscal 1970 and $100 million 1971 for highway safety programs
- $33 million in fiscal 1970 and 1971 for construction of roads in national forests
- $30 million in fiscal 1970 and 1971 for construction of roads and bridges on Native American lands
- $25 million in fiscal 1970 for highway beautification.
- $16 million in fiscal 1970 and 1971 for construction of roads on public lands
- $1 million in fiscal 1970 for construction of parkways
- Interstate expansion: The act authorized construction of an additional 1,500 miles (2,400 km) of interstate highway, bringing the system total to 42,500 miles (68,400 km). Most of the expansion was for suburban beltways. Section 139 of the act permitted DOT to designate as an Interstate Highway any road meeting all standards for interstate highways and which connect to and are logical additions to the Interstate Highway System. These additions were not to be included in the Interstate Highway System mileage cap of 42,500 miles (68,400 km). DOT was also authorized to make minor modifications to the Interstate Highway System routes up to a total of 500 miles (800 km).
- Diversion of funds: Under what became known as the Howard-Cramer amendment to Section 103(e)(2), states were permitted to substitute an existing road for a planned interstate route so long as the planned route was not essential to a "unified" interstate system and so long as the road was not a toll road.

Among the new programs created by the act were:

- Aid to displaced families: The act created a new program to assist states in aiding families displaced by urban highway construction. Families could only be relocated with federal funds if the new housing was not in a crime-ridden neighborhood, was environmentally sound, and had good-quality sanitation (plumbing, sewage, etc.). States wishing to participate in this program were required to enact enabling legislation by July 1970. States were also required to comply with the provisions of the Fair Housing Act of 1968. The federal government assumed 100 percent of the cost of property acquisition, up to $25,000. It also provided up to $5,000 for a one-, two-, or three-family dwellings (provided the displaced person purchased a new home within the year), and $1,500 for apartment dwellers. Property owners were also reimbursed (tax free) for recording fees, transfer taxes, and any early mortgage payments they were forced to make after purchasing new property consequent to highway construction. Displaced persons were able to apply for 100 percent reimbursement of their relocation moving costs, or in lieu of actual costs a $200 moving allowance and $100 dislocation allowance. Businesses or farms which were relocated were eligible to receive their average annual net earnings or $5,000, whichever was less. (Businesses could only apply if relocation caused a "substantial loss" of patronage and it was a single-site operation.) States were also required to provide relocation counseling for free.
- Bridge inspection: The act created the first national bridge inspection program in U.S. history. All bridges constructed with federal funds, or which carried a federally funded road, were required to be inspected. DOT was charged with establishing standards for bridge safety. This new program was inspired by the collapse of the Silver Bridge in Point Pleasant, West Virginia, in 1967
- Right-of-way purchase: The act established a revolving fund for states to use in acquiring of rights-of-way for future highway construction. The goal of this program was two-fold: To reduce the cost acquiring land, and to minimize the dislocation of families and others due to highway construction.
- Fringe parking: The act created a demonstration program to test the effects of fringe parking on the use of mass transit. The federal government assumed 50 percent of the cost of each project.
- The Traffic Operations Program to Improve Capacity and Safety (TOPICS). This program helps states and localities collect data on, analyze, and work to reduce traffic congestion and improve traffic flow in urban areas. Streets were classified as Type 1 roads (urban streets which qualified under the act's Primary Road and Secondary Road aid programs) or Type 2 (all other urban streets). Type 1 roads qualified for all three aspects of the program (data collection, analysis, and congestion reduction), but Type 2 only qualified for the two (data collection and analysis). The act authorized $200 million in expenditures for fiscal 1970 and 1971. States were required to matching the federal payment up to 50 percent of total funds expended.

Among the new requirements of the act were:

- Civil rights: Highway construction projects were required to comply with the provisions of the Civil Rights Act of 1964. Section 22(a) of the act required states to sign Equal Employment Opportunity (EEO) Assurances in order to receive federal highway funds. These EEOAs required states to show how contractors and subcontractors were complying with EEO obligations. States were permitted to take a variety of measure to ensure EEO compliance, and including contract sanctions. Section 140 of the act also permitted DOT to establish highway construction and technology training programs, skill improvement programs, and summer transportation institutes, with the intent of assisting minorities in obtaining the knowledge, skill, and experience necessary to obtain jobs in highway construction. Training and assistance programs to help minority-owned businesses compete effectively for highway construction contracts and subcontracts were also authorized. Preferential treatment for Native Americans was protected for those project on Native American lands and reservations. States were also permitted to enact preferential treatment provisions for Native Americans on projects near tribal lands.
- Davis-Bacon Act: Section 12 of the act extended the Davis-Bacon Act to all federally funded highway projects.
- Environmental and historic protection: The Department of Transportation Act of 1966 required the new United States Department of Transportation to protect the environment, wildlife refuges, and historic sites from the harmful effects of highway construction, and to reduce the negative effects of highway construction overall while planning, constructing, and maintaining highways. It was unclear, however, if this requirement applied to states receiving federal highway funds, or if states were required to take into account these considerations while making their own plans—the 1968 re-authorization act made it clear the DOT requirements applied to any highway constructed with federal funds.
- Public input: The act required that DOT and states hold two public hearings (one on site planning, one on design) on the economic, environmental, and social impact of federally funded highway construction. These hearings were also to take into account how well highway construction matched state and local goals in these areas. Regulations proposed by DOT in October 1968 would have allowed the public to appeal any state highway department siting or design decision on the basis of 21 different grounds. These regulations caused such an uproar among state officials that they were withdrawn in January 1969.
- Toll roads: A new condition of the receipt of federal highway construction funds was no project could be a toll road

Among the specific construction authorizations or requirements of the act were:

- Authorization of the construction of the Fort Washington Parkway in Maryland
- Require the state of New Jersey to repay all federal funds expended on construction of the Garden State Parkway (a toll road). The state was also required to construct toll-free frontage roads along certain sections of the highway for local traffic.
- Require the District of Columbia to construct the Three Sisters Bridge, the Potomac River Freeway (from the Three Sisters Bridge to 26th Street NW), and the Center Leg (terminating at New York Avenue NW) and East Leg (terminating at Bladensburg Road NE) of the Inner Loop

== Supreme Court case ==
The act's requirement that the Three Sisters Bridge be built without regard to previous court decisions or impact on environmental or historic sites was contested in court by citizens of the District of Columbia. One lawsuit alleged that illegal political pressure had been applied to various federal and city agencies in order to get them to approve a bridge at the Three Sisters location. This suit alleged that the Federal-Aid Highway Act's provisions were inapplicable, since no bridge could be built there.

After a lengthy and provocative trial that led to explosive media headlines, Judge John J. Sirica of the United States District Court for the District of Columbia ruled on August 27, 1970, that illegal political pressure had been applied to secure the bridge's placement over the Three Sisters. Judge Sirica ruled that work must stop on the bridge within 20 days. The district court's ruling was affirmed by the United States Court of Appeals for the District of Columbia Circuit on October 12, 1971.

Although the District of Columbia declined to appeal, the federal government asked the Supreme Court of the United States to intervene on January 17, 1972. However, the Supreme Court declined to take the case on March 27, 1972, leaving the court of appeals' ruling intact.

The Supreme Court's decision in D.C. Federation of Civic Associations v. Volpe, 459 F.2d 1231 (D.C. Cir.), supp. op., 459 F.2d 1263 (D.C. Cir. 1971), cert. den'd, 405 U.S. 1030 (1972), was a notorious one. Chief Justice Warren E. Burger filed a concurring opinion in which he supported the court's denial of certiorari. Burger noted that Congress had mooted previous court rulings regarding the Three Sisters Bridge. However, he suggested, if Congress wanted to pass legislation removing the bridge from the federal courts' jurisdiction, it was well within its right to do so. Burger's concurrence was widely interpreted as indicating that he was willing to uphold the Nixon-administration supported anti-busing legislation, which removed desegregation busing as a means of ensuring equal education for minorities. Burger quickly amended his concurrence—an extremely rare event—to add the words "in this respect" to the final sentence of his concurrence. He thereby made it clear that he believed Congress should only remove the Three Sisters Bridge from the jurisdiction of the courts, not the busing issue.

== Bibliography ==
- Chamberlin, William P. (1999). Historic Highway Bridge Preservation Practices. Washington, D.C.: National Academy Press. ISBN 9780309068536.
- Cole, G. Mattney (1994). Assessment and Remediation of Petroleum Contaminated Sites. New York: CRC Press. ISBN 9780873718240.
- Gutfreund, Owen D. (2004). Twentieth Century Sprawl: Highways and the Reshaping of the American Landscape. New York: Oxford University Press. ISBN 9780195141412.
- Richardson, E.V. & Lagasse, Peter F. (1999). Stream Stability and Scour at Highway Bridges: Water Resources Engineering. Reston, VA: American Society of Civil Engineers. ISBN 9780784404072.
- Rose, Mark H. & Mohl, Raymond A. (2012). Interstate: Highway Politics and Policy Since 1939. Knoxville, TN: University of Tennessee Press. ISBN 9781572337251.
- Schrag, Zachary M. (2006). The Great Society Subway: A History of the Washington Metro. Baltimore: Johns Hopkins University Press. ISBN 9780801882463.
- Swift, Earl (2011). The Big Roads: The Untold Story of the Engineers, Visionaries, and Trailblazers Who Created the American Superhighways. Boston: Houghton Mifflin Harcourt. ISBN 9780618812417.
- Weiner, Edward (1999). Urban Transportation Planning in the United States: An Historical Overview. Westport, CT: Praeger. ISBN 9780313002236.
