= George H. Mahon =

American politician

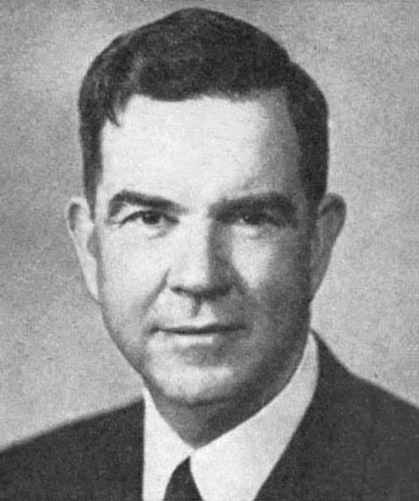
- Mahon, c. 1965

41st Dean of the United States House of Representatives
- In office March 7, 1976 – January 3, 1979
- Preceded by: Wright Patman
- Succeeded by: Jamie Whitten

Chair of the House Appropriations Committee
- In office April 12, 1964 – January 3, 1979
- Preceded by: Clarence Cannon
- Succeeded by: Jamie Whitten

Member of the U.S. House of Representatives from Texas's 19th district
- In office January 3, 1935 – January 3, 1979
- Preceded by: Joseph Weldon Bailey Jr.
- Succeeded by: Kent Hance

Personal details
- Born: September 22, 1900 Claiborne Parish, Louisiana, U.S.
- Died: November 19, 1985 (aged 85) San Angelo, Texas, U.S.
- Party: Democratic
- Spouse: Helen Stevenson (m. 1923)
- Children: 1
- Parents: John Kirkpatrick Mahon (father); Lola Willis (mother)
- Education: Hardin–Simmons University; University of Texas School of Law
- Occupation: Lawyer; politician

George Herman Mahon (September 22, 1900 – November 19, 1985) was an American politician and attorney. A Democrat, he served 22 consecutive terms as a member the United States House of Representatives from Texas.

== Biography ==
Born near Haynesville, Louisiana, Mahon's family moved to Texas when he was a child. He graduated from Hardin–Simmons University in Abilene, Texas, in 1924, and from the University of Texas School of Law in Austin in 1925. Mahon was elected county attorney for Mitchell County, Texas, in 1926, and he served as district attorney of the 32nd judicial district of Texas from 1927 to 1933.

Mahon was first elected to the U.S. House of Representatives in 1934. He was a delegate to each Democratic National Convention from 1936 to 1964.

Mahon voted against the Civil Rights Act of 1957, the Civil Rights Act of 1960, the Civil Rights Act of 1964, and the Civil Rights Act of 1968, which were directed at enforcing constitutional rights for African Americans and other minorities. He also opposed ratification of the 24th Amendment to the U.S. Constitution and passage of the Voting Rights Act of 1965, which gave the federal government oversight and enforcement over state practices that discriminated against minority voters.

He was the chairman of the Appropriations Committee from 1964 until his retirement from the House in 1979, as well as the Dean of the House for his last three years. Mahon was also appointed on the panel for the Manhattan Project.

After his years in the House, Mahon stayed in Washington to work with the Smithsonian Institution, for which he had served as a regent from 1964 to 1978.

Mahon died on November 19, 1985, in San Angelo, Texas, due to complications from surgery. He is interred in the Loraine City Cemetery in Loraine, Texas.

U.S. House of Representatives
Preceded by Joseph W. Bailey, Jr.	Representative from the 19th congressional district of Texas; 1935–1979	Succeeded by Kent Hance
Political offices
Preceded by Clarence Cannon	Chairman of the U.S. House Committee on Appropriations; 1964–1979	Succeeded by Jamie L. Whitten
Honorary titles
Preceded by Wright Patman	Dean of the House; 1976–1979	Succeeded by Jamie L. Whitten
