= 1924 United States Senate election in Texas =

- November 4, 1924
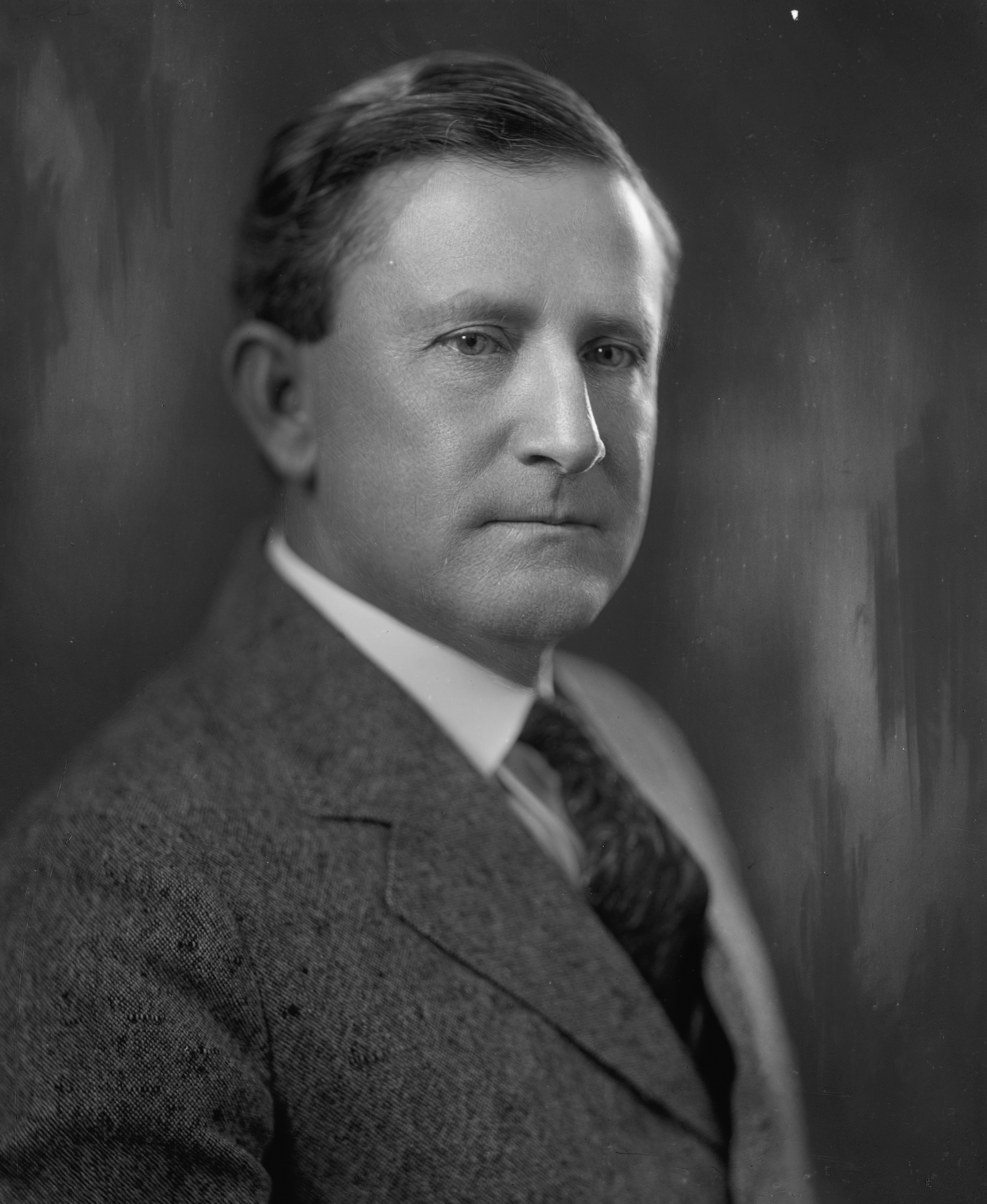

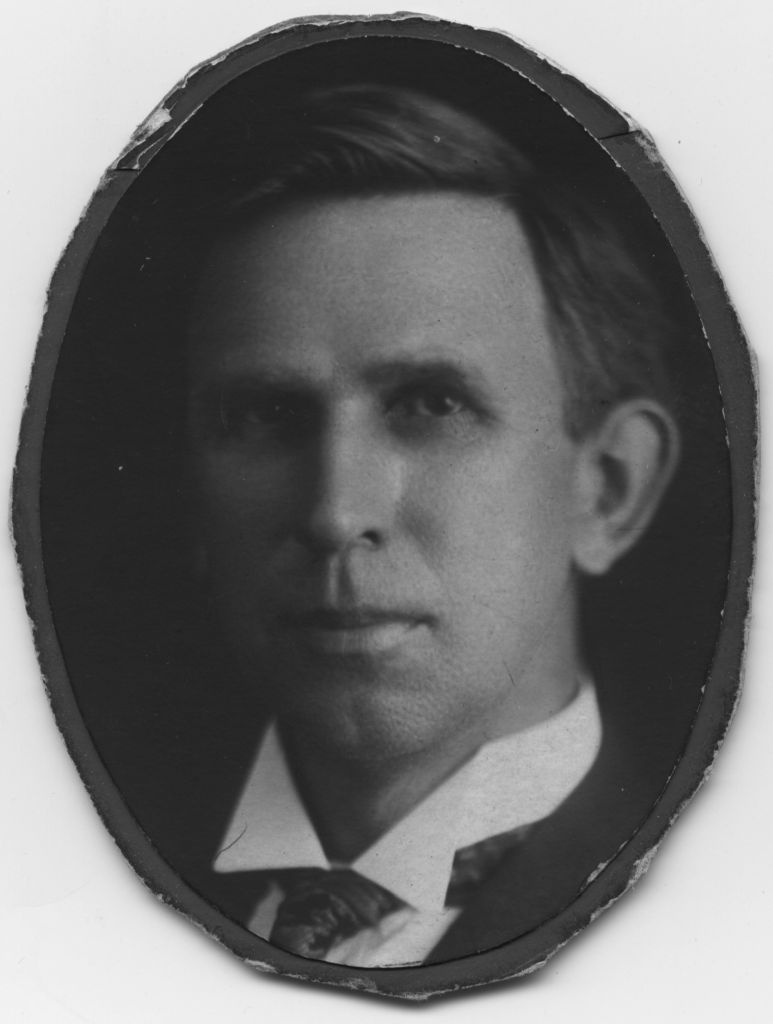
Nominee	Morris Sheppard	T. M. Kennerly
Party	Democratic	Republican
Popular vote	591,913	101,208
Percentage	85.40%	14.60%
- County results Sheppard: 50–60% 60–70% 70–80% 80–90% >90% Kennerly: 50–60% 60–70% No votes
U.S. senator before election
Morris Sheppard
Democratic
Elected U.S. Senator
Morris Sheppard
Democratic

The 1924 United States Senate election in Texas was held on November 4, 1924. Incumbent Democratic U.S. Senator Morris Sheppard was re-elected to a third term in office, easily dispatching his challengers.

== Democratic primary ==
=== Candidates ===
- Fred W. Davis, Texas Commissioner of Agriculture
- John F. Maddox
- Morris Sheppard, incumbent senator since 1913

=== Results ===
1924 Democratic Senate primary
Party	Candidate	Votes	%
Democratic	Morris Sheppard (incumbent)	440,511	64.76%
Democratic	Fred W. Davis	159,633	23.47%
Democratic	John F. Maddox	80,070	11.77%
Total votes		680,244	100.00%

== General election ==
=== Results ===
1924 United States Senate election in Texas
Party	Candidate	Votes	%	±%
Democratic	Morris Sheppard (incumbent)	591,913	85.40%	▼1.29
Republican	T. M. Kennerly	101,208	14.60%	▲2.19
Total votes		693,121	100.00%	
Democratic hold				

== See also ==
- 1924 United States Senate elections
