= Choice B. Randell =

American politician (1857–1945)

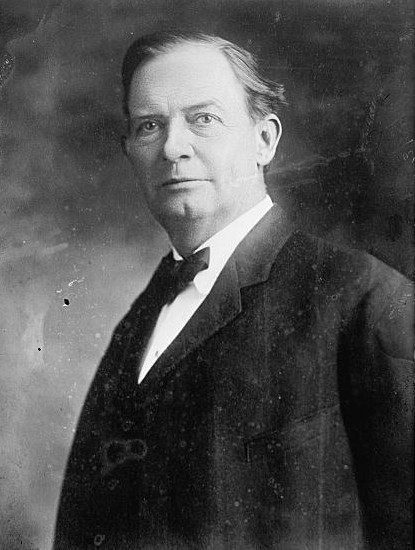

Member of the U.S. House of Representatives from Texas
- In office March 4, 1901 – March 3, 1913
- Preceded by: Joseph W. Bailey
- Succeeded by: Sam Rayburn
- Constituency: 5th district (1901–1903); 4th district (1903–1913)

Grayson County Attorney
- In office 1882–1888

Denison City Attorney
- In office 1882–1882

Personal details
- Born: Choice Boswell Randell; January 1, 1857 Murray County, Georgia, US
- Died: October 19, 1945 (aged 88) Sherman, Texas, US
- Party: Democratic
- Spouse: Anna Marschalk
- Children: Andrew
- Profession: Lawyer

Military service
- Allegiance: Texas State Militia
- Unit: Fourth Texas Regiment

Choice Boswell Randell (January 1, 1857 – October 19, 1945) was an American lawyer and politician who served six terms as a U.S. representative from Texas from 1901 to 1913.

He was the nephew of Lucius Jeremiah Gartrell.

== Early life ==
Randell was born in Murray County, Georgia on January 1, 1857. His parents were James L. and Louisa Amantha (née Gartrell) Randell. He attended public and private schools. He then enrolled in the North Georgia Agricultural College but left without graduating in 1878 to study law. He was admitted to the Georgia State Bar in 1878.

== Career ==
Randell commenced his law practice in Denison, Texas, in January 1879. He moved to Sherman, Texas, in 1882 and continued the practice of law.

Randell was elected as a Democrat to the fifty-seventh and to the five succeeding Congresses (March 4, 1901 – March 3, 1913). He did not support women's suffrage and expressed in a letter to women's suffragette leader Ermina Thompson Folsom that his concern was race-based. Randell was the author of the Anti-Graft Resolutions to prevent members of the United States Congress from receiving gifts or fees from anyone with business before Congress.

With pending reapportionment of his congressional district, Randell chose to make a bid for the United States Senate in 1912, rather than run for re-election as a member of the United States House of Representatives. Randell was unsuccessful in his Senate bid, and Sam Rayburn succeeded him in the U.S. House.

After his career in public service ended, Randell resumed the practice of law.

== Personal life ==
Randell was married to Anna Marschalk. They had a son, Andrew.

Randell belonged to the Freemasons, Improved Order of Red Men, Knights of Pythias, Odd Fellows, and Woodmen of the World. He was a Presbyterian.

He died in Sherman, Texas, October 19, 1945 at the age of 88 years. He was buried at West Hill Cemetery in Sherman, Texas.

== Sources ==
- United States Congress. "Choice B. Randell (id: R000042)". Biographical Directory of the United States Congress.

U.S. House of Representatives
Preceded by Joseph Weldon Bailey	Member of the U.S. House of Representatives from Texas's 5th congressional district 1901–1903	Succeeded by James Andrew Beall
Preceded by Morris Sheppard	Member of the U.S. House of Representatives from Texas's 4th congressional district 1903–1913	Succeeded by Sam Rayburn
