= Morris Sheppard =

American politician (1875–1941)

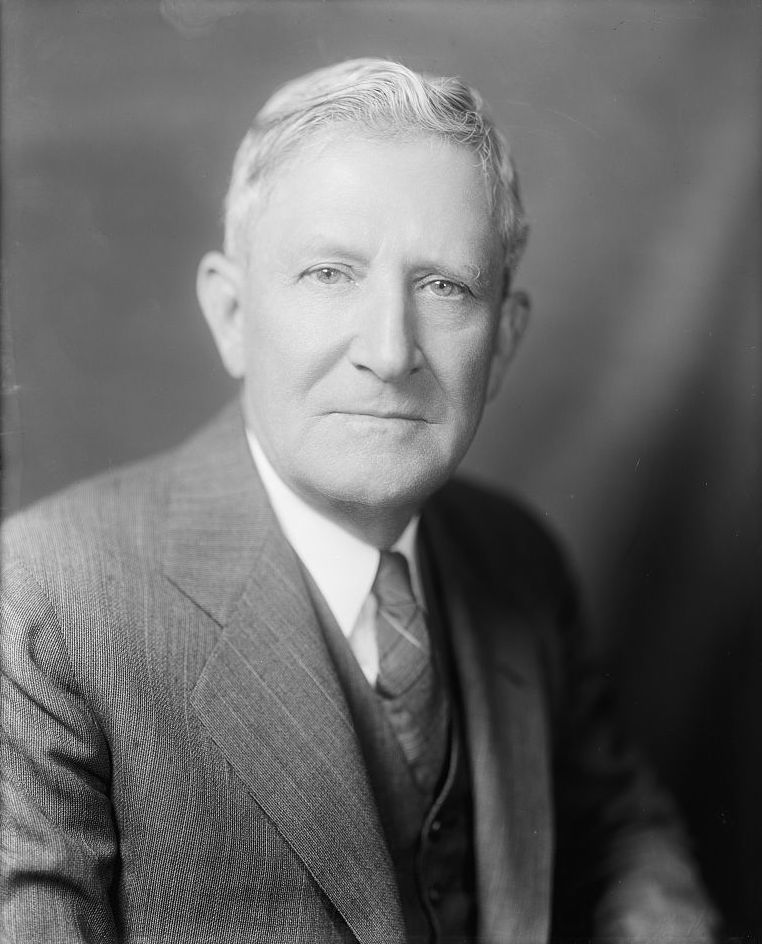
- Sheppard, 1913–1941

Senate Minority Whip
- In office March 4, 1929 – March 4, 1933
- Leader: Joseph Taylor Robinson
- Preceded by: Peter G. Gerry
- Succeeded by: Felix Hebert

United States Senator from Texas
- In office February 3, 1913 – April 9, 1941
- Preceded by: Rienzi Johnston
- Succeeded by: Andrew Houston

Member of the U.S. House of Representatives from Texas
- In office November 15, 1902 – February 3, 1913
- Preceded by: John Levi Sheppard
- Succeeded by: Horace Worth Vaughan
- Constituency: 4th district (1902–03); 1st district (1903–13)

Personal details
- Born: John Morris Sheppard; May 28, 1875 Morris County, Texas, U.S.
- Died: April 9, 1941 (aged 65) Washington, D.C., U.S.
- Party: Democratic
- Spouse: Lucille Sanderson
- Children: 3
- Parent(s): John Levi Sheppard; Margaret Alice Eddins
- Relatives: Connie Mack III (grandson); Richard S. Arnold (grandson); Morris S. Arnold (grandson); Connie Mack IV (great-grandson)
- Education: University of Texas, Austin (BA, LLB); Yale University (LLM)

John Morris Sheppard (May 28, 1875 – April 9, 1941) was a Democratic United States congressman and United States senator from Texas. He authored the Eighteenth Amendment (prohibition) and introduced it in the Senate, and is referred to as "the father of national Prohibition."

== Early life ==
Sheppard was born in Morris County in east Texas, the oldest of seven children, to lawyer John Levi Sheppard, later a judge and United States Representative; and his wife, Margaret Alice Eddins. Through his mother, Sheppard was a direct descendant of Robert Morris (1734–1806) of Philadelphia, Pennsylvania, a financier who had signed the Declaration of Independence, the Articles of Confederation, and the United States Constitution.

Sheppard received his B.A. degree from the University of Texas at Austin in 1895, Phi Beta Kappa. While there, he was a member of Kappa Alpha Order. He received an LL.B. from the University of Texas School of Law in 1897. While in law school, Sheppard became a member of the Methodist Church, and became friendly with two classmates, future Governor Pat Neff and future U.S. Senator Tom Connally. In 1898, he received his LL.M. from Yale Law School.

== Career ==
He began practicing law with his father in Pittsburg, Texas and later Texarkana. In 1902, Sheppard was elected as a Democrat to replace his deceased father in the United States House of Representatives. He held the seat until his resignation in 1913, when the Texas legislature elected him to the United States Senate. In 1914 and while holding the office of Senator, he was on the Central Committee of the First National Conference on Race Betterment, a conference on eugenics held at the Battle Creek Sanatorium. He served as Democratic whip between 1929 and 1933.

In the 1928 presidential election, Texas voters abandoned the Democratic candidate, Alfred E. Smith, Governor of New York and a Catholic, carrying the state for Republican Herbert Hoover and contributing to his victory. In the summer of 1929, First Lady Lou Hoover arranged the traditional teas for wives of congressmen, inviting Jessie De Priest, wife of Oscar Stanton De Priest of Chicago, the first African American elected to Congress in the 20th century. Senator Sheppard was among those who objected to this invitation, quoted as saying, "I regret the incident beyond measure. It is recognition of social equality between the white and black races and is fraught with infinite danger to our white civilization."

Sheppard held his Senate seat until his death in Washington, D.C. in 1941. Then-Representative Lyndon B. Johnson ran for Sheppard's Senate seat in the 1941 special election, and lost to Governor W. Lee O'Daniel.

== Legislative agenda ==
As Senator, Sheppard sponsored progressive reform legislation promoting rural credit programs, child labor laws, and antitrust laws. He was also an advocate of women's suffrage in the United States. But he supported the maintenance in Texas and the South of racial segregation in public facilities and the disenfranchisement of blacks.

=== Prohibition ===
During his tenure, Sheppard was a vocal supporter of the temperance movement. He helped write the Webb–Kenyon Act (1913) to regulate the interstate shipment of alcoholic beverages, authored the Sheppard Bone-Dry Act (1916) to impose prohibition on the District of Columbia, introduced the Senate resolution for the Eighteenth Amendment establishing national prohibition, and helped write the Volstead Act that provided for its enforcement.

However, during the Prohibition era, a still that produced 130 gallons of moonshine per day was discovered on a Texas ranch that Sheppard owned.

When a resolution calling for a Twenty-first Amendment to repeal prohibition was introduced to the Senate by John J. Blaine of Wisconsin, Sheppard filibustered it for eight-and-a-half hours. He was not helped by a single "dry" senator and he relented, the motion passing by 63 votes to 23.

=== Sheppard–Towner Maternity and Infancy Protection Act of 1921 ===
Co-sponsored by Sheppard and Horace Mann Towner, the Sheppard–Towner Act of 1921 provided Federal matching funds for services aimed to reduce maternal and infant mortality. The funding included: midwife training; visiting nurses for pregnant women and new mothers; distribution of nutrition and hygiene information; health clinics, doctors and nurses, for pregnant women, mothers and children.

=== Federal Credit Union Act of 1934 ===
Senator Sheppard and Congressman Wright Patman are considered the fathers of the Federal Credit Union Act of 1934. Sheppard was the act's author. The bill had stalled in the United States House of Representatives, considerably shortening the time the United States Senate had to pass the final version. Rather than sending the bill to a conference committee, Sheppard asked the Senate to pass the bill unanimously without reading the bill or the amendments. The bill passed the Senate unanimously. The Morris Sheppard Credit Union in Texarkana, Texas carries the Senator's name, while the institution's local credit union chapter is named after Congressman Patman.

== Personal life ==
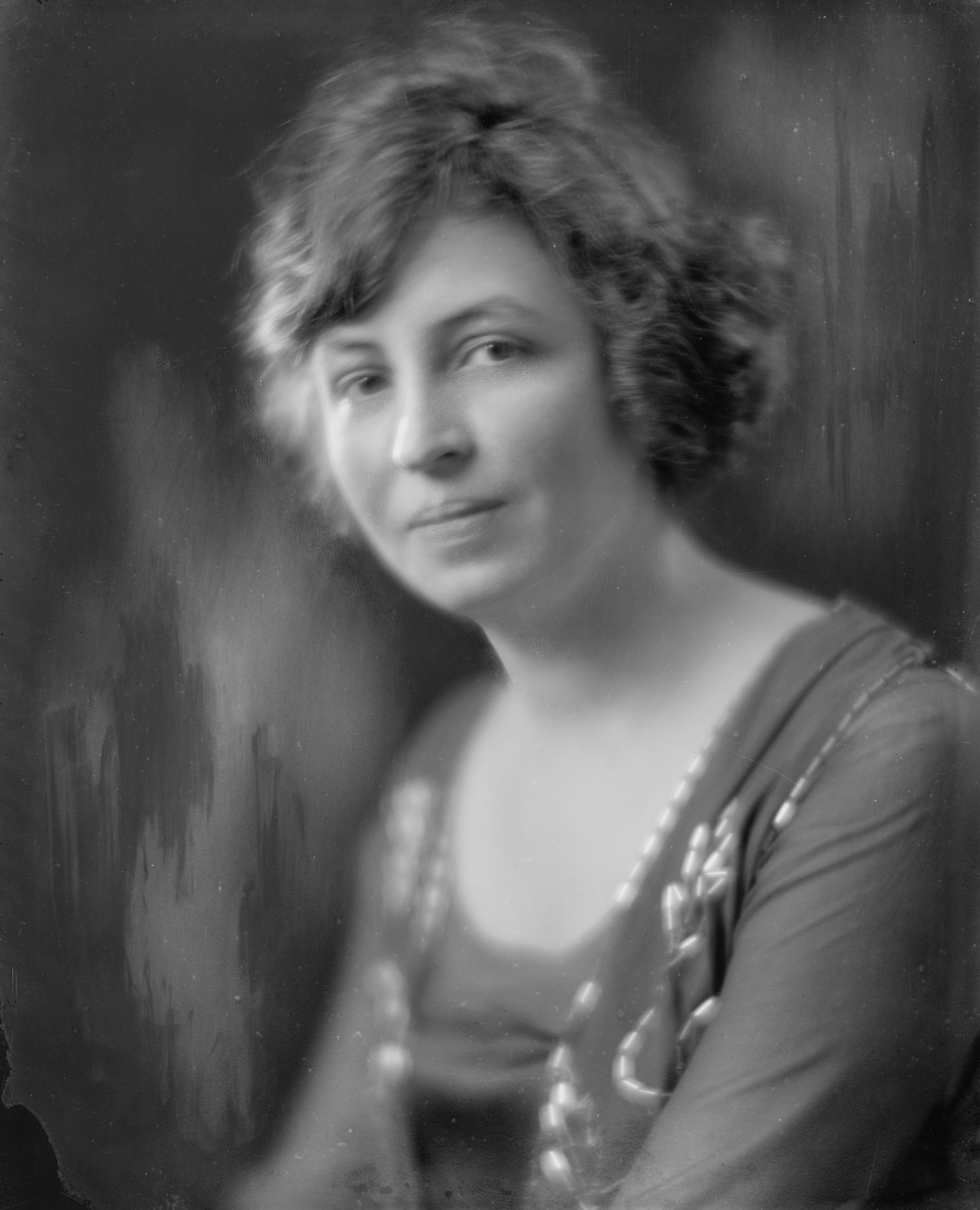
Lucile Sanderson Sheppard, c. 1925

On December 1, 1909, Sheppard married Lucile Sanderson. The couple had three daughters: Susan, Lucile, and Janet. Some of their descendants also became politicians. Through their daughter Susan, Sheppard and his wife were the grandparents of Connie Mack III, Republican U.S. Representative and Senator from Florida, and great-grandparents of Connie Mack IV, Republican U.S. Representative from Florida. Other Sheppard grandsons, through daughter Janet, were Democrat Richard Sheppard Arnold (1936–2004) and Republican Morris Sheppard "Buzz" Arnold (born 1941). They were judges at different times on the United States District Court for the Western District of Arkansas and later concurrently on the United States Court of Appeals for the Eighth Circuit, the only brothers to serve concurrently on a U.S. federal court of appeals. The federal courthouse in Little Rock is named in Judge Richard Arnold's honor. Judge Morris Arnold, a Republican, remains on the Eighth Circuit court under senior status.

Sheppard was a member of the Benevolent and Protective Order of Elks, Freemasons, Improved Order of Red Men, Knights of Pythias, Odd Fellows, and Woodmen of the World.

Sheppard died in office of a brain hemorrhage on April 9, 1941. He is interred at Hillcrest Cemetery in Texarkana, Texas. Andrew Jackson Houston was appointed senator in his place until a special election could be held.

The year following Sheppard's death, his widow Lucile Sanderson Sheppard married Tom Connally, also a United States senator from Texas. Senator Connally also predeceased Lucile. When she died in 1980, she was buried with her first husband, Sheppard, in Hillcrest Cemetery.

== Legacy ==
Sheppard Air Force Base in Wichita Falls, Texas was named in his honor.

== See also ==
- List of members of the United States Congress who died in office (1900–1949)
- List of United States senators from Texas

U.S. House of Representatives
Preceded by John Levi Sheppard	Member of the U.S. House of Representatives from Texas's 4th congressional district 1902–1903	Succeeded by Choice B. Randell
Preceded by Thomas Ball	Member of the U.S. House of Representatives from Texas's 1st congressional district 1903–1913	Succeeded by Horace Worth Vaughan
Preceded by Richard Bartholdt	Chair of the House Public Buildings Committee; 1911–1913	Succeeded by Frank Clark
U.S. Senate
Preceded by Rienzi Johnston	U.S. Senator (Class 2) from Texas; 1913–1941; Served alongside: Charles Allen Culberson, Earle B. Mayfield, Tom Connally	Succeeded by Andrew Houston
Preceded by Henry F. Lippitt	Chair of the Senate Agriculture Department Expenditures Committee; 1913–1917	Succeeded by William F. Kirby
Preceded by William E. Chilton	Chair of the Senate Census Committee; 1916–1919	Succeeded by Howard Sutherland
Preceded by Edwin S. Johnson	Chair of the Senate Revolutionary Claims Committee; 1919–1921	Position established
Preceded by Peter G. Gerry	Senate Minority Whip; 1929–1933	Succeeded by Felix Hebert
Preceded by David A. Reed	Chair of the Senate Military Affairs Committee; 1933–1941	Succeeded by Robert Rice Reynolds
Party political offices
First	Democratic nominee for U.S. Senator from Texas (Class 2); 1918, 1924, 1930, 1936	Succeeded by W. Lee O'Daniel
Preceded by Peter G. Gerry	Senate Democratic Whip; 1929–1933	Succeeded by J. Hamilton Lewis
