= James Andrew Beall =

American politician (1866–1929)

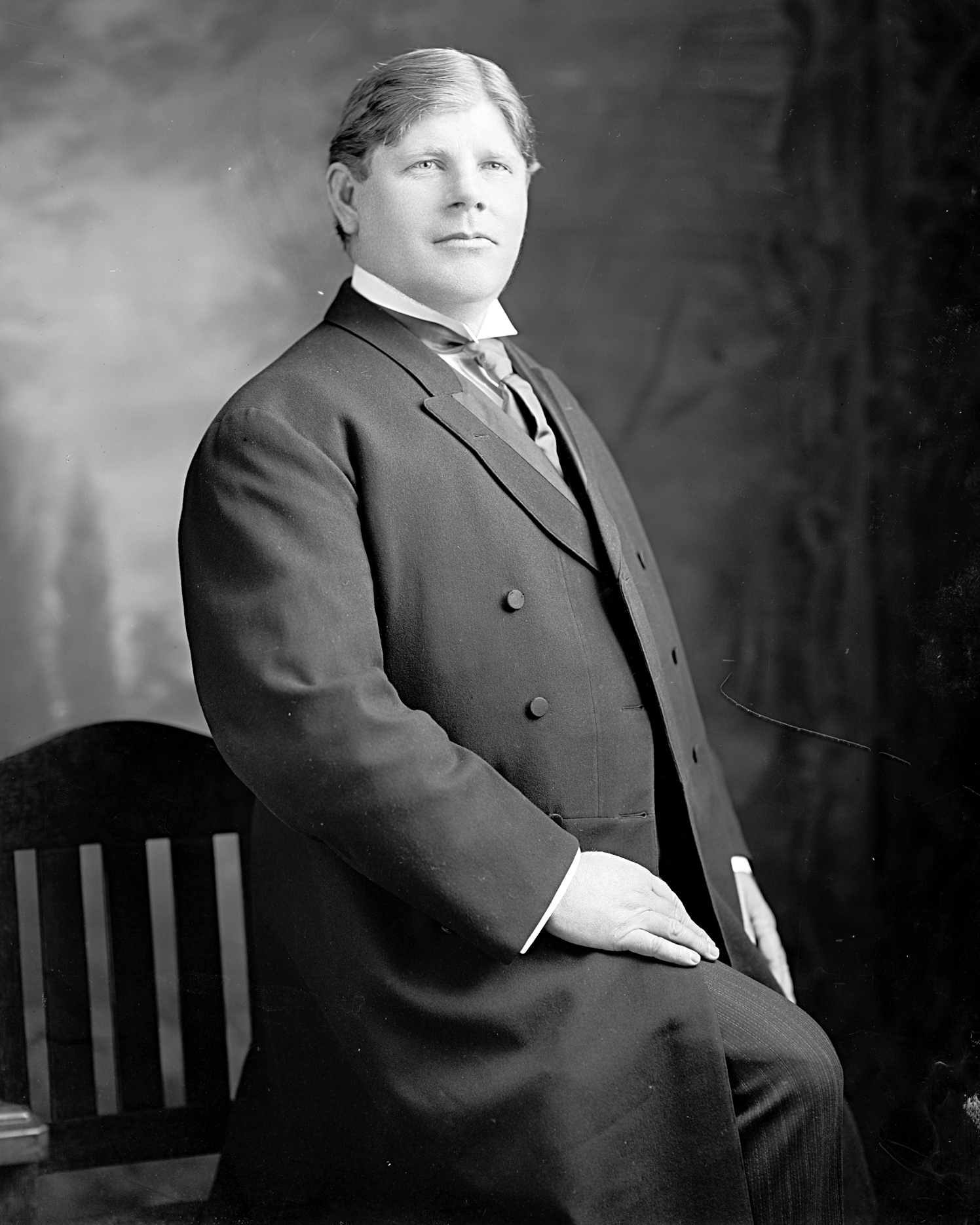

United States Congressman Texas 5th Congressional District
- In office March 4, 1903 – March 3, 1915
- Preceded by: Choice B. Randell
- Succeeded by: Hatton W. Sumners

Senator Texas Senate, District 10
- In office 1895–1899
- Preceded by: Astyanax M. Douglass
- Succeeded by: Daniel W. Odell

Member Texas House of Representatives Districts 37 and 68
- In office 1891–1895

Personal details
- Born: October 25, 1866 Ellis County, Texas, US
- Died: February 11, 1929 (aged 62) Dallas, Texas, US
- Resting place: Oakland Cemetery; Dallas, Texas
- Party: Democratic
- Spouse: Patricia Martin
- Children: One child
- Education: University of Texas at Austin
- Profession: Attorney

James Andrew "Jack" Beall (October 25, 1866 – February 11, 1929) was an American politician. He represented Texas in the United States House of Representatives from 1903 to 1915.

== Early years ==
Beall was born on a farm near Midlothian, Texas to Richard Beall and Adelaide Pierce Beall. He attended the county schools and then taught school in 1884 and 1885. He was graduated from the law department of the University of Texas at Austin, in 1890, and was admitted to the bar the same year and commenced practice in Waxahachie, Texas.

== Public service ==
Beall was a member of the Texas House of Representatives, 1892–1895. He served in the Texas Senate, 1895–1899, and was elected as a Democrat to the 58th Congress, and to the five succeeding Congresses, March 4, 1903 – March 3, 1915. In Congress, he was chairman, Committee on Expenditures in the Department of Justice (62nd Congress). He was not a candidate for renomination in 1914.

Along with members of the southern delegation to Congress, Beall was opposed to William Jennings Bryan on the latter's 1909 support of Prohibition, citing the Texas preference of handling the matter on local levels.

On July 4, 1911, Congressman Beall spoke before a crowd of 1,500 at Meriden, Connecticut for that city's Independence Day celebration. The crowd found him "charming" and "eloquent" as he spoke of the nation's history, his faith in God, and of the heroes of the old South.

== Later years ==
After leaving Congress, Beall moved to Dallas, Texas, in 1914, and became a law partner with M.D. Templeton and Tony B. Williams. In 1923, he became a senior law partner of Beall, Watson, Rollins, Burford and Ryburn.

Beall became president of the Dallas Union Trust Company in 1927.

He served as president of the Texas Electric Railway from 1921 until his death.

== Personal life and death ==
In 1898, he married Patricia Martin of Waxahachie. The couple had one child, Jack Beall (December 6, 1898 – January 11, 1963).

Jack Beall died in Dallas of a heart attack on February 11, 1929. He was buried in the Oakland Cemetery in Dallas.

U.S. House of Representatives
Preceded by Choice B. Randell	Member of the U.S. House of Representatives from Texas's 5th congressional district March 4, 1903 – March 3, 1915	Succeeded by Hatton W. Sumners
