= List of United States senators from Texas =

Current senators

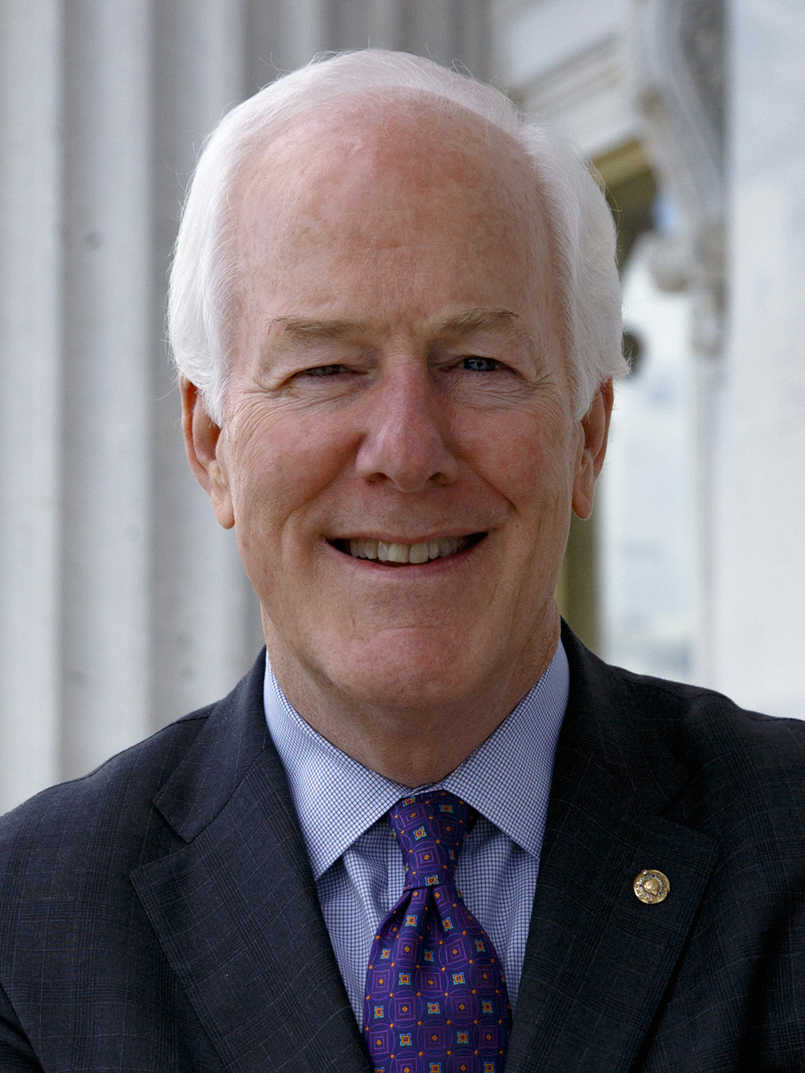
John Cornyn (R)

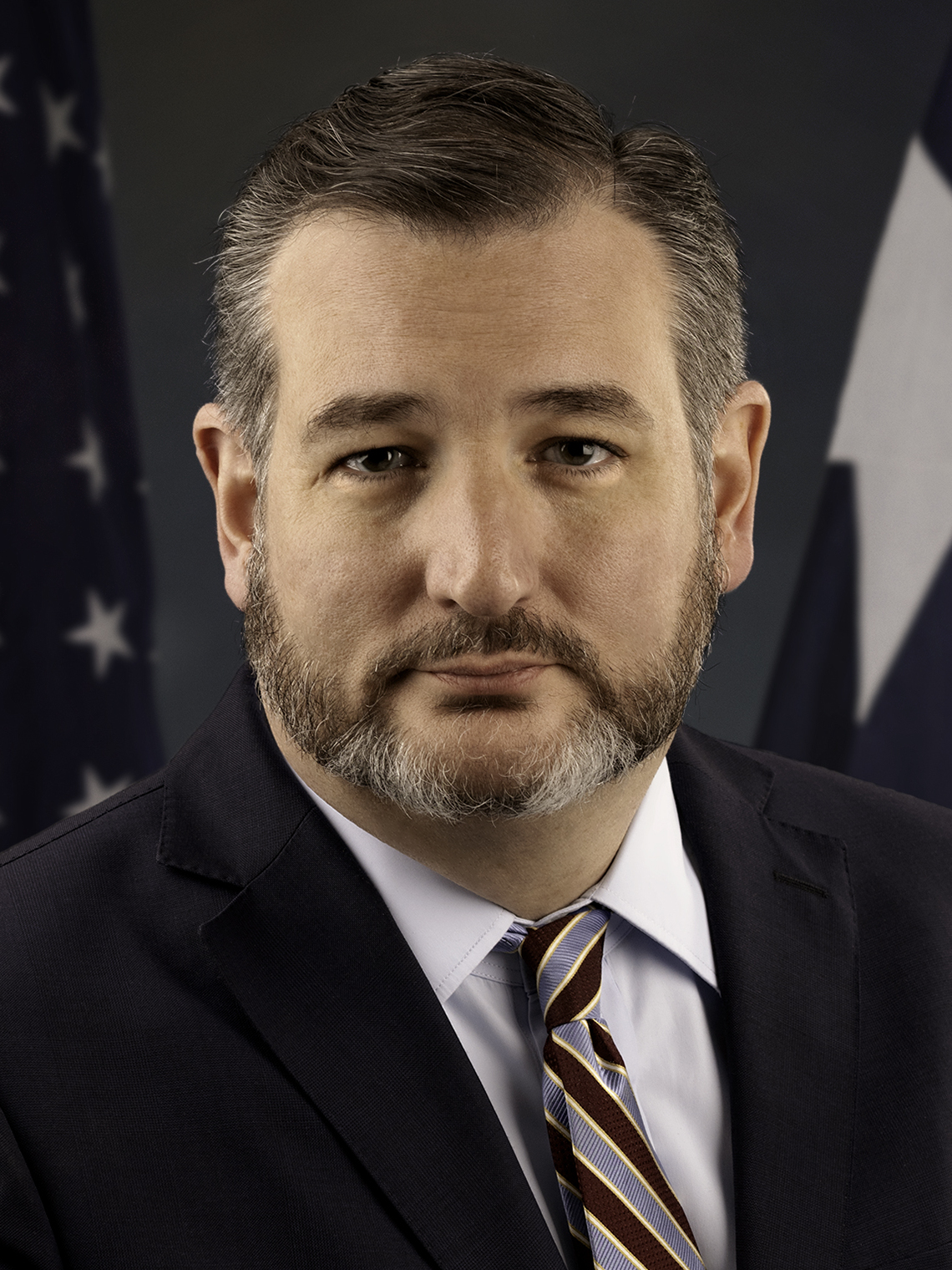
Ted Cruz (R)

(ordered by seniority)

Texas was admitted to the United States on December 29, 1845, and elects its U.S. senators to class 1 and class 2. The state's current senators are John Cornyn (serving since 2002) and Ted Cruz (serving since 2013). A total of 27 Democrats, 7 Republicans, and 1 Liberal Republican have served or are serving as U.S. senators from Texas. Morris Sheppard was Texas's longest-serving senator (1913–1941).

In 2026, Texas elected a Democratic senator for the first time since 1988. Both seats were occupied by Republicans from 1993 until 2026 when Democratic candidate James Talarico won the class 2 seat to succeed Cornyn, who was defeated in the Republican primary runoff.

== List of senators ==
Class 1 Class 1 senators belong to the electoral cycle that most recently had regular elections in 2006, 2012, 2018, and 2024. The next election will be in 2030.						C	Class 2 Class 2 senators belong to the electoral cycle that most recently had regular elections in 2008, 2014, 2020, and 2026. The next election will be in 2032.					
#	Senator	Party	Dates in office	Electoral history	T	C	T	Electoral history	Dates in office	Party	Senator	#
Vacant			Dec 29, 1845 – Feb 21, 1846	Texas did not elect its senators until two months after statehood.	1	29th	1	Texas did not elect its senators until two months after statehood.	Dec 29, 1845 – Feb 21, 1846	Vacant		
1	Thomas Jefferson Rusk (Nacogdoches)	Democratic	Feb 21, 1846 – Jul 29, 1857	Elected in 1846.	1	29th	1	Elected in 1846.	Feb 21, 1846 – Mar 3, 1859	Democratic	Sam Houston (Huntsville)	1
1	Thomas Jefferson Rusk (Nacogdoches)	Democratic	Feb 21, 1846 – Jul 29, 1857	Elected in 1846.	1	30th	2	Re-elected in 1847.	Feb 21, 1846 – Mar 3, 1859	Democratic	Sam Houston (Huntsville)	1
1	Thomas Jefferson Rusk (Nacogdoches)	Democratic	Feb 21, 1846 – Jul 29, 1857	Elected in 1846.	1	31st	2	Re-elected in 1847.	Feb 21, 1846 – Mar 3, 1859	Democratic	Sam Houston (Huntsville)	1
1	Thomas Jefferson Rusk (Nacogdoches)	Democratic	Feb 21, 1846 – Jul 29, 1857	Re-elected in 1851.	2	32nd	2	Re-elected in 1847.	Feb 21, 1846 – Mar 3, 1859	Democratic	Sam Houston (Huntsville)	1
1	Thomas Jefferson Rusk (Nacogdoches)	Democratic	Feb 21, 1846 – Jul 29, 1857	Re-elected in 1851.	2	33rd	3	Re-elected in 1853. Retired.	Feb 21, 1846 – Mar 3, 1859	Democratic	Sam Houston (Huntsville)	1
1	Thomas Jefferson Rusk (Nacogdoches)	Democratic	Feb 21, 1846 – Jul 29, 1857	Re-elected in 1851.	2	34th	3	Re-elected in 1853. Retired.	Feb 21, 1846 – Mar 3, 1859	Democratic	Sam Houston (Huntsville)	1
1	Thomas Jefferson Rusk (Nacogdoches)	Democratic	Feb 21, 1846 – Jul 29, 1857	Re-elected in 1857. Died.	3	35th	3	Re-elected in 1853. Retired.	Feb 21, 1846 – Mar 3, 1859	Democratic	Sam Houston (Huntsville)	1
Vacant			Jul 29, 1857 – Nov 9, 1857		3	35th	3	Re-elected in 1853. Retired.	Feb 21, 1846 – Mar 3, 1859	Democratic	Sam Houston (Huntsville)	1
2	J. Pinckney Henderson (San Augustine)	Democratic	Nov 9, 1857 – Jun 4, 1858	Appointed to finish Rusk's term. Died.	3	35th	3	Re-elected in 1853. Retired.	Feb 21, 1846 – Mar 3, 1859	Democratic	Sam Houston (Huntsville)	1
Vacant			Jun 4, 1858 – Sep 27, 1858		3	35th	3	Re-elected in 1853. Retired.	Feb 21, 1846 – Mar 3, 1859	Democratic	Sam Houston (Huntsville)	1
3	Matthias Ward (Jefferson)	Democratic	Sep 27, 1858 – Dec 5, 1859	Appointed to continue Rusk's term. Lost nomination to finish Rusk's term.	3	35th	3	Re-elected in 1853. Retired.	Feb 21, 1846 – Mar 3, 1859	Democratic	Sam Houston (Huntsville)	1
3	Matthias Ward (Jefferson)	Democratic	Sep 27, 1858 – Dec 5, 1859	Appointed to continue Rusk's term. Lost nomination to finish Rusk's term.	3	36th	4	Elected in 1859. Expelled following Texas's secession from the Union.	Mar 4, 1859 – Jul 11, 1861	Democratic	John Hemphill (Austin)	2
4	Louis Wigfall (Marshall)	Democratic	Dec 5, 1859 – Mar 23, 1861	Elected to finish Rusk's term. Withdrew.	3	36th	4	Elected in 1859. Expelled following Texas's secession from the Union.	Mar 4, 1859 – Jul 11, 1861	Democratic	John Hemphill (Austin)	2
4	Louis Wigfall (Marshall)	Democratic	Dec 5, 1859 – Mar 23, 1861	Elected to finish Rusk's term. Withdrew.	3	37th	4	Elected in 1859. Expelled following Texas's secession from the Union.	Mar 4, 1859 – Jul 11, 1861	Democratic	John Hemphill (Austin)	2
Vacant			Mar 23, 1861 – Mar 30, 1870	Civil War and reconstruction.	3	37th	4	Elected in 1859. Expelled following Texas's secession from the Union.	Mar 4, 1859 – Jul 11, 1861	Democratic	John Hemphill (Austin)	2
Vacant			Mar 23, 1861 – Mar 30, 1870	Civil War and reconstruction.	3	37th	4	Civil War and reconstruction.	Jul 11, 1861 – Mar 31, 1870	Vacant		
Vacant			Mar 23, 1861 – Mar 30, 1870	Civil War and reconstruction.	4	38th	4	Civil War and reconstruction.	Jul 11, 1861 – Mar 31, 1870	Vacant		
Vacant			Mar 23, 1861 – Mar 30, 1870	Civil War and reconstruction.	4	39th	5	Civil War and reconstruction.	Jul 11, 1861 – Mar 31, 1870	Vacant		
Vacant			Mar 23, 1861 – Mar 30, 1870	Civil War and reconstruction.	4	40th	5	Civil War and reconstruction.	Jul 11, 1861 – Mar 31, 1870	Vacant		
Vacant			Mar 23, 1861 – Mar 30, 1870	Civil War and reconstruction.	5	41st	5	Civil War and reconstruction.	Jul 11, 1861 – Mar 31, 1870	Vacant		
5	J. W. Flanagan (Henderson)	Republican	Mar 30, 1870 – Mar 3, 1875	Elected upon readmission.	5	41st	5	Civil War and reconstruction.	Jul 11, 1861 – Mar 31, 1870	Vacant		
5	J. W. Flanagan (Henderson)	Republican	Mar 30, 1870 – Mar 3, 1875	Elected upon readmission.	5	41st	5	Elected upon readmission.	Mar 31, 1870 – Mar 3, 1877	Republican	Morgan C. Hamilton (Austin)	3
5	J. W. Flanagan (Henderson)	Republican	Mar 30, 1870 – Mar 3, 1875	Elected upon readmission.	5	42nd	6	Re-elected in 1870. Retired.	Mar 31, 1870 – Mar 3, 1877	Republican	Morgan C. Hamilton (Austin)	3
5	J. W. Flanagan (Henderson)	Republican	Mar 30, 1870 – Mar 3, 1875	Elected upon readmission.	5	43rd	6	Re-elected in 1870. Retired.	Mar 31, 1870 – Mar 3, 1877	Liberal Republican	Morgan C. Hamilton (Austin)	3
6	Samuel B. Maxey (Paris)	Democratic	Mar 4, 1875 – Mar 3, 1887	Elected in 1875.	6	44th	6	Re-elected in 1870. Retired.	Mar 31, 1870 – Mar 3, 1877	Republican	Morgan C. Hamilton (Austin)	3
6	Samuel B. Maxey (Paris)	Democratic	Mar 4, 1875 – Mar 3, 1887	Elected in 1875.	6	45th	7	Elected in 1876.	Mar 4, 1877 – Mar 3, 1895	Democratic	Richard Coke (Waco)	4
6	Samuel B. Maxey (Paris)	Democratic	Mar 4, 1875 – Mar 3, 1887	Elected in 1875.	6	46th	7	Elected in 1876.	Mar 4, 1877 – Mar 3, 1895	Democratic	Richard Coke (Waco)	4
6	Samuel B. Maxey (Paris)	Democratic	Mar 4, 1875 – Mar 3, 1887	Re-elected in 1881. Lost re-election.	7	47th	7	Elected in 1876.	Mar 4, 1877 – Mar 3, 1895	Democratic	Richard Coke (Waco)	4
6	Samuel B. Maxey (Paris)	Democratic	Mar 4, 1875 – Mar 3, 1887	Re-elected in 1881. Lost re-election.	7	48th	8	Re-elected in 1883.	Mar 4, 1877 – Mar 3, 1895	Democratic	Richard Coke (Waco)	4
6	Samuel B. Maxey (Paris)	Democratic	Mar 4, 1875 – Mar 3, 1887	Re-elected in 1881. Lost re-election.	7	49th	8	Re-elected in 1883.	Mar 4, 1877 – Mar 3, 1895	Democratic	Richard Coke (Waco)	4
7	John H. Reagan (Palestine)	Democratic	Mar 4, 1887 – Jun 10, 1891	Elected in 1887. Resigned to become chairman of the Railroad Commission of Texas.	8	50th	8	Re-elected in 1883.	Mar 4, 1877 – Mar 3, 1895	Democratic	Richard Coke (Waco)	4
7	John H. Reagan (Palestine)	Democratic	Mar 4, 1887 – Jun 10, 1891	Elected in 1887. Resigned to become chairman of the Railroad Commission of Texas.	8	51st	9	Re-elected in 1889. Retired.	Mar 4, 1877 – Mar 3, 1895	Democratic	Richard Coke (Waco)	4
7	John H. Reagan (Palestine)	Democratic	Mar 4, 1887 – Jun 10, 1891	Elected in 1887. Resigned to become chairman of the Railroad Commission of Texas.	8	52nd	9	Re-elected in 1889. Retired.	Mar 4, 1877 – Mar 3, 1895	Democratic	Richard Coke (Waco)	4
8	Horace Chilton (Tyler)	Democratic	Jun 10, 1891 – Mar 22, 1892	Appointed to continue Reagan's term. Lost election to finish Reagan's term.	8	52nd	9	Re-elected in 1889. Retired.	Mar 4, 1877 – Mar 3, 1895	Democratic	Richard Coke (Waco)	4
9	Roger Q. Mills (Corsicana)	Democratic	Mar 30, 1892 – Mar 3, 1899	Elected to finish Reagan's term.	8	52nd	9	Re-elected in 1889. Retired.	Mar 4, 1877 – Mar 3, 1895	Democratic	Richard Coke (Waco)	4
9	Roger Q. Mills (Corsicana)	Democratic	Mar 30, 1892 – Mar 3, 1899	Re-elected in 1893. Retired.	9	53rd	9	Re-elected in 1889. Retired.	Mar 4, 1877 – Mar 3, 1895	Democratic	Richard Coke (Waco)	4
9	Roger Q. Mills (Corsicana)	Democratic	Mar 30, 1892 – Mar 3, 1899	Re-elected in 1893. Retired.	9	54th	10	Elected in 1895. Retired.	Mar 4, 1895 – Mar 3, 1901	Democratic	Horace Chilton (Tyler)	5
9	Roger Q. Mills (Corsicana)	Democratic	Mar 30, 1892 – Mar 3, 1899	Re-elected in 1893. Retired.	9	55th	10	Elected in 1895. Retired.	Mar 4, 1895 – Mar 3, 1901	Democratic	Horace Chilton (Tyler)	5
10	Charles A. Culberson (Dallas)	Democratic	Mar 4, 1899 – Mar 3, 1923	Elected in 1899.	10	56th	10	Elected in 1895. Retired.	Mar 4, 1895 – Mar 3, 1901	Democratic	Horace Chilton (Tyler)	5
10	Charles A. Culberson (Dallas)	Democratic	Mar 4, 1899 – Mar 3, 1923	Elected in 1899.	10	57th	11	Elected in 1901.	Mar 4, 1901 – Jan 3, 1913	Democratic	Joseph W. Bailey (Gainesville)	6
10	Charles A. Culberson (Dallas)	Democratic	Mar 4, 1899 – Mar 3, 1923	Elected in 1899.	10	58th	11	Elected in 1901.	Mar 4, 1901 – Jan 3, 1913	Democratic	Joseph W. Bailey (Gainesville)	6
10	Charles A. Culberson (Dallas)	Democratic	Mar 4, 1899 – Mar 3, 1923	Re-elected in 1905.	11	59th	11	Elected in 1901.	Mar 4, 1901 – Jan 3, 1913	Democratic	Joseph W. Bailey (Gainesville)	6
10	Charles A. Culberson (Dallas)	Democratic	Mar 4, 1899 – Mar 3, 1923	Re-elected in 1905.	11	60th	12	Re-elected in 1907. Resigned.	Mar 4, 1901 – Jan 3, 1913	Democratic	Joseph W. Bailey (Gainesville)	6
10	Charles A. Culberson (Dallas)	Democratic	Mar 4, 1899 – Mar 3, 1923	Re-elected in 1905.	11	61st	12	Re-elected in 1907. Resigned.	Mar 4, 1901 – Jan 3, 1913	Democratic	Joseph W. Bailey (Gainesville)	6
10	Charles A. Culberson (Dallas)	Democratic	Mar 4, 1899 – Mar 3, 1923	Re-elected in 1911.	12	62nd	12	Re-elected in 1907. Resigned.	Mar 4, 1901 – Jan 3, 1913	Democratic	Joseph W. Bailey (Gainesville)	6
10	Charles A. Culberson (Dallas)	Democratic	Mar 4, 1899 – Mar 3, 1923	Re-elected in 1911.	12	62nd	12	Appointed to continue Bailey's term. Lost election to finish Bailey's term. Retired.	Jan 4, 1913 – Jan 29, 1913	Democratic	Rienzi Melville Johnston (Houston)	7
10	Charles A. Culberson (Dallas)	Democratic	Mar 4, 1899 – Mar 3, 1923	Re-elected in 1911.	12	62nd	12		Jan 29, 1913 – Feb 3, 1913	Vacant		
10	Charles A. Culberson (Dallas)	Democratic	Mar 4, 1899 – Mar 3, 1923	Re-elected in 1911.	12	62nd	12	Elected in 1913 to finish Bailey's term.	Feb 3, 1913 – Apr 9, 1941	Democratic	Morris Sheppard (Texarkana)	8
10	Charles A. Culberson (Dallas)	Democratic	Mar 4, 1899 – Mar 3, 1923	Re-elected in 1911.	12	63rd	13	Elected in 1913 to the full term.	Feb 3, 1913 – Apr 9, 1941	Democratic	Morris Sheppard (Texarkana)	8
10	Charles A. Culberson (Dallas)	Democratic	Mar 4, 1899 – Mar 3, 1923	Re-elected in 1911.	12	64th	13	Elected in 1913 to the full term.	Feb 3, 1913 – Apr 9, 1941	Democratic	Morris Sheppard (Texarkana)	8
10	Charles A. Culberson (Dallas)	Democratic	Mar 4, 1899 – Mar 3, 1923	Re-elected in 1916. Lost renomination.	13	65th	13	Elected in 1913 to the full term.	Feb 3, 1913 – Apr 9, 1941	Democratic	Morris Sheppard (Texarkana)	8
10	Charles A. Culberson (Dallas)	Democratic	Mar 4, 1899 – Mar 3, 1923	Re-elected in 1916. Lost renomination.	13	66th	14	Re-elected in 1918.	Feb 3, 1913 – Apr 9, 1941	Democratic	Morris Sheppard (Texarkana)	8
10	Charles A. Culberson (Dallas)	Democratic	Mar 4, 1899 – Mar 3, 1923	Re-elected in 1916. Lost renomination.	13	67th	14	Re-elected in 1918.	Feb 3, 1913 – Apr 9, 1941	Democratic	Morris Sheppard (Texarkana)	8
11	Earle B. Mayfield (Austin)	Democratic	Mar 4, 1923 – Mar 3, 1929	Elected in 1922. Lost renomination.	14	68th	14	Re-elected in 1918.	Feb 3, 1913 – Apr 9, 1941	Democratic	Morris Sheppard (Texarkana)	8
11	Earle B. Mayfield (Austin)	Democratic	Mar 4, 1923 – Mar 3, 1929	Elected in 1922. Lost renomination.	14	69th	15	Re-elected in 1924.	Feb 3, 1913 – Apr 9, 1941	Democratic	Morris Sheppard (Texarkana)	8
11	Earle B. Mayfield (Austin)	Democratic	Mar 4, 1923 – Mar 3, 1929	Elected in 1922. Lost renomination.	14	70th	15	Re-elected in 1924.	Feb 3, 1913 – Apr 9, 1941	Democratic	Morris Sheppard (Texarkana)	8
12	Tom Connally (Marlin)	Democratic	Mar 4, 1929 – Jan 3, 1953	Elected in 1928.	15	71st	15	Re-elected in 1924.	Feb 3, 1913 – Apr 9, 1941	Democratic	Morris Sheppard (Texarkana)	8
12	Tom Connally (Marlin)	Democratic	Mar 4, 1929 – Jan 3, 1953	Elected in 1928.	15	72nd	16	Re-elected in 1930.	Feb 3, 1913 – Apr 9, 1941	Democratic	Morris Sheppard (Texarkana)	8
12	Tom Connally (Marlin)	Democratic	Mar 4, 1929 – Jan 3, 1953	Elected in 1928.	15	73rd	16	Re-elected in 1930.	Feb 3, 1913 – Apr 9, 1941	Democratic	Morris Sheppard (Texarkana)	8
12	Tom Connally (Marlin)	Democratic	Mar 4, 1929 – Jan 3, 1953	Re-elected in 1934.	16	74th	16	Re-elected in 1930.	Feb 3, 1913 – Apr 9, 1941	Democratic	Morris Sheppard (Texarkana)	8
12	Tom Connally (Marlin)	Democratic	Mar 4, 1929 – Jan 3, 1953	Re-elected in 1934.	16	75th	17	Re-elected in 1936. Died.	Feb 3, 1913 – Apr 9, 1941	Democratic	Morris Sheppard (Texarkana)	8
12	Tom Connally (Marlin)	Democratic	Mar 4, 1929 – Jan 3, 1953	Re-elected in 1934.	16	76th	17	Re-elected in 1936. Died.	Feb 3, 1913 – Apr 9, 1941	Democratic	Morris Sheppard (Texarkana)	8
12	Tom Connally (Marlin)	Democratic	Mar 4, 1929 – Jan 3, 1953	Re-elected in 1940.	17	77th	17	Re-elected in 1936. Died.	Feb 3, 1913 – Apr 9, 1941	Democratic	Morris Sheppard (Texarkana)	8
12	Tom Connally (Marlin)	Democratic	Mar 4, 1929 – Jan 3, 1953	Re-elected in 1940.	17	77th	17		Apr 9, 1941 – Apr 21, 1941	Vacant		
12	Tom Connally (Marlin)	Democratic	Mar 4, 1929 – Jan 3, 1953	Re-elected in 1940.	17	77th	17	Appointed to continue Sheppard's term. Died.	Apr 21, 1941 – Jun 26, 1941	Democratic	Andrew J. Houston (La Porte)	9
12	Tom Connally (Marlin)	Democratic	Mar 4, 1929 – Jan 3, 1953	Re-elected in 1940.	17	77th	17		Jun 26, 1941 – Aug 4, 1941	Vacant		
12	Tom Connally (Marlin)	Democratic	Mar 4, 1929 – Jan 3, 1953	Re-elected in 1940.	17	77th	17	Elected to finish Sheppard's term.	Aug 4, 1941 – Jan 3, 1949	Democratic	W. Lee O'Daniel (Fort Worth)	10
12	Tom Connally (Marlin)	Democratic	Mar 4, 1929 – Jan 3, 1953	Re-elected in 1940.	17	78th	18	Re-elected in 1942. Retired.	Aug 4, 1941 – Jan 3, 1949	Democratic	W. Lee O'Daniel (Fort Worth)	10
12	Tom Connally (Marlin)	Democratic	Mar 4, 1929 – Jan 3, 1953	Re-elected in 1940.	17	79th	18	Re-elected in 1942. Retired.	Aug 4, 1941 – Jan 3, 1949	Democratic	W. Lee O'Daniel (Fort Worth)	10
12	Tom Connally (Marlin)	Democratic	Mar 4, 1929 – Jan 3, 1953	Re-elected in 1946. Retired.	18	80th	18	Re-elected in 1942. Retired.	Aug 4, 1941 – Jan 3, 1949	Democratic	W. Lee O'Daniel (Fort Worth)	10
12	Tom Connally (Marlin)	Democratic	Mar 4, 1929 – Jan 3, 1953	Re-elected in 1946. Retired.	18	81st	19	Elected in 1948.	Jan 3, 1949 – Jan 3, 1961	Democratic	Lyndon B. Johnson (Johnson City)	11
12	Tom Connally (Marlin)	Democratic	Mar 4, 1929 – Jan 3, 1953	Re-elected in 1946. Retired.	18	82nd	19	Elected in 1948.	Jan 3, 1949 – Jan 3, 1961	Democratic	Lyndon B. Johnson (Johnson City)	11
13	Price Daniel (Liberty)	Democratic	Jan 3, 1953 – Jan 14, 1957	Elected in 1952. Resigned to become Governor of Texas.	19	83rd	19	Elected in 1948.	Jan 3, 1949 – Jan 3, 1961	Democratic	Lyndon B. Johnson (Johnson City)	11
13	Price Daniel (Liberty)	Democratic	Jan 3, 1953 – Jan 14, 1957	Elected in 1952. Resigned to become Governor of Texas.	19	84th	20	Re-elected in 1954. Re-elected in 1960, but resigned to become U.S. Vice President.	Jan 3, 1949 – Jan 3, 1961	Democratic	Lyndon B. Johnson (Johnson City)	11
13	Price Daniel (Liberty)	Democratic	Jan 3, 1953 – Jan 14, 1957	Elected in 1952. Resigned to become Governor of Texas.	19	85th	20	Re-elected in 1954. Re-elected in 1960, but resigned to become U.S. Vice President.	Jan 3, 1949 – Jan 3, 1961	Democratic	Lyndon B. Johnson (Johnson City)	11
14	Bill Blakley (Dallas)	Democratic	Jan 15, 1957 – Apr 28, 1957	Appointed to continue Daniel's term. Retired when his successor was elected.	19	85th	20	Re-elected in 1954. Re-elected in 1960, but resigned to become U.S. Vice President.	Jan 3, 1949 – Jan 3, 1961	Democratic	Lyndon B. Johnson (Johnson City)	11
15	Ralph Yarborough (Austin)	Democratic	Apr 29, 1957 – Jan 3, 1971	Elected to finish Daniel's term.	19	85th	20	Re-elected in 1954. Re-elected in 1960, but resigned to become U.S. Vice President.	Jan 3, 1949 – Jan 3, 1961	Democratic	Lyndon B. Johnson (Johnson City)	11
15	Ralph Yarborough (Austin)	Democratic	Apr 29, 1957 – Jan 3, 1971	Re-elected in 1958.	20	86th	20	Re-elected in 1954. Re-elected in 1960, but resigned to become U.S. Vice President.	Jan 3, 1949 – Jan 3, 1961	Democratic	Lyndon B. Johnson (Johnson City)	11
15	Ralph Yarborough (Austin)	Democratic	Apr 29, 1957 – Jan 3, 1971	Re-elected in 1958.	20	87th	21	Appointed to begin Johnson's term. Lost election to finish Johnson's term.	Jan 3, 1961 – Jun 14, 1961	Democratic	Bill Blakley (Dallas)	12
15	Ralph Yarborough (Austin)	Democratic	Apr 29, 1957 – Jan 3, 1971	Re-elected in 1958.	20	87th	21	Elected in 1961 to finish Johnson's term.	Jun 15, 1961 – Jan 3, 1985	Republican	John Tower (Wichita Falls)	13
15	Ralph Yarborough (Austin)	Democratic	Apr 29, 1957 – Jan 3, 1971	Re-elected in 1958.	20	88th	21	Elected in 1961 to finish Johnson's term.	Jun 15, 1961 – Jan 3, 1985	Republican	John Tower (Wichita Falls)	13
15	Ralph Yarborough (Austin)	Democratic	Apr 29, 1957 – Jan 3, 1971	Re-elected in 1964. Lost renomination.	21	89th	21	Elected in 1961 to finish Johnson's term.	Jun 15, 1961 – Jan 3, 1985	Republican	John Tower (Wichita Falls)	13
15	Ralph Yarborough (Austin)	Democratic	Apr 29, 1957 – Jan 3, 1971	Re-elected in 1964. Lost renomination.	21	90th	22	Re-elected in 1966.	Jun 15, 1961 – Jan 3, 1985	Republican	John Tower (Wichita Falls)	13
15	Ralph Yarborough (Austin)	Democratic	Apr 29, 1957 – Jan 3, 1971	Re-elected in 1964. Lost renomination.	21	91st	22	Re-elected in 1966.	Jun 15, 1961 – Jan 3, 1985	Republican	John Tower (Wichita Falls)	13
16	Lloyd Bentsen (Austin)	Democratic	Jan 3, 1971 – Jan 20, 1993	Elected in 1970.	22	92nd	22	Re-elected in 1966.	Jun 15, 1961 – Jan 3, 1985	Republican	John Tower (Wichita Falls)	13
16	Lloyd Bentsen (Austin)	Democratic	Jan 3, 1971 – Jan 20, 1993	Elected in 1970.	22	93rd	23	Re-elected in 1972.	Jun 15, 1961 – Jan 3, 1985	Republican	John Tower (Wichita Falls)	13
16	Lloyd Bentsen (Austin)	Democratic	Jan 3, 1971 – Jan 20, 1993	Elected in 1970.	22	94th	23	Re-elected in 1972.	Jun 15, 1961 – Jan 3, 1985	Republican	John Tower (Wichita Falls)	13
16	Lloyd Bentsen (Austin)	Democratic	Jan 3, 1971 – Jan 20, 1993	Re-elected in 1976.	23	95th	23	Re-elected in 1972.	Jun 15, 1961 – Jan 3, 1985	Republican	John Tower (Wichita Falls)	13
16	Lloyd Bentsen (Austin)	Democratic	Jan 3, 1971 – Jan 20, 1993	Re-elected in 1976.	23	96th	24	Re-elected in 1978. Retired.	Jun 15, 1961 – Jan 3, 1985	Republican	John Tower (Wichita Falls)	13
16	Lloyd Bentsen (Austin)	Democratic	Jan 3, 1971 – Jan 20, 1993	Re-elected in 1976.	23	97th	24	Re-elected in 1978. Retired.	Jun 15, 1961 – Jan 3, 1985	Republican	John Tower (Wichita Falls)	13
16	Lloyd Bentsen (Austin)	Democratic	Jan 3, 1971 – Jan 20, 1993	Re-elected in 1982.	24	98th	24	Re-elected in 1978. Retired.	Jun 15, 1961 – Jan 3, 1985	Republican	John Tower (Wichita Falls)	13
16	Lloyd Bentsen (Austin)	Democratic	Jan 3, 1971 – Jan 20, 1993	Re-elected in 1982.	24	99th	25	Elected in 1984.	Jan 3, 1985 – Nov 30, 2002	Republican	Phil Gramm (College Station)	14
16	Lloyd Bentsen (Austin)	Democratic	Jan 3, 1971 – Jan 20, 1993	Re-elected in 1982.	24	100th	25	Elected in 1984.	Jan 3, 1985 – Nov 30, 2002	Republican	Phil Gramm (College Station)	14
16	Lloyd Bentsen (Austin)	Democratic	Jan 3, 1971 – Jan 20, 1993	Re-elected in 1988. Resigned to become U.S. Secretary of the Treasury.	25	101st	25	Elected in 1984.	Jan 3, 1985 – Nov 30, 2002	Republican	Phil Gramm (College Station)	14
16	Lloyd Bentsen (Austin)	Democratic	Jan 3, 1971 – Jan 20, 1993	Re-elected in 1988. Resigned to become U.S. Secretary of the Treasury.	25	102nd	26	Re-elected in 1990.	Jan 3, 1985 – Nov 30, 2002	Republican	Phil Gramm (College Station)	14
16	Lloyd Bentsen (Austin)	Democratic	Jan 3, 1971 – Jan 20, 1993	Re-elected in 1988. Resigned to become U.S. Secretary of the Treasury.	25	103rd	26	Re-elected in 1990.	Jan 3, 1985 – Nov 30, 2002	Republican	Phil Gramm (College Station)	14
Vacant			Jan 20, 1993 – Jan 21, 1993		25	103rd	26	Re-elected in 1990.	Jan 3, 1985 – Nov 30, 2002	Republican	Phil Gramm (College Station)	14
17	Bob Krueger (New Braunfels)	Democratic	Jan 21, 1993 – Jun 14, 1993	Appointed to continue Bentsen's term. Lost election to finish Bentsen's term.	25	103rd	26	Re-elected in 1990.	Jan 3, 1985 – Nov 30, 2002	Republican	Phil Gramm (College Station)	14
18	Kay Bailey Hutchison (Dallas)	Republican	Jun 14, 1993 – Jan 3, 2013	Elected in 1993 to finish Bentsen's term.	25	103rd	26	Re-elected in 1990.	Jan 3, 1985 – Nov 30, 2002	Republican	Phil Gramm (College Station)	14
18	Kay Bailey Hutchison (Dallas)	Republican	Jun 14, 1993 – Jan 3, 2013	Re-elected in 1994.	26	104th	26	Re-elected in 1990.	Jan 3, 1985 – Nov 30, 2002	Republican	Phil Gramm (College Station)	14
18	Kay Bailey Hutchison (Dallas)	Republican	Jun 14, 1993 – Jan 3, 2013	Re-elected in 1994.	26	105th	27	Re-elected in 1996. Retired, and resigned early to give successor preferential seniority.	Jan 3, 1985 – Nov 30, 2002	Republican	Phil Gramm (College Station)	14
18	Kay Bailey Hutchison (Dallas)	Republican	Jun 14, 1993 – Jan 3, 2013	Re-elected in 1994.	26	106th	27	Re-elected in 1996. Retired, and resigned early to give successor preferential seniority.	Jan 3, 1985 – Nov 30, 2002	Republican	Phil Gramm (College Station)	14
18	Kay Bailey Hutchison (Dallas)	Republican	Jun 14, 1993 – Jan 3, 2013	Re-elected in 2000.	27	107th	27	Re-elected in 1996. Retired, and resigned early to give successor preferential seniority.	Jan 3, 1985 – Nov 30, 2002	Republican	Phil Gramm (College Station)	14
18	Kay Bailey Hutchison (Dallas)	Republican	Jun 14, 1993 – Jan 3, 2013	Re-elected in 2000.	27	107th	27		Nov 30, 2002 – Dec 2, 2002	Vacant		
18	Kay Bailey Hutchison (Dallas)	Republican	Jun 14, 1993 – Jan 3, 2013	Re-elected in 2000.	27	107th	27	Appointed to finish Gramm's term, having been elected to the next term.	Dec 2, 2002 – present	Republican	John Cornyn (Austin)	15
18	Kay Bailey Hutchison (Dallas)	Republican	Jun 14, 1993 – Jan 3, 2013	Re-elected in 2000.	27	108th	28	Elected in 2002.	Dec 2, 2002 – present	Republican	John Cornyn (Austin)	15
18	Kay Bailey Hutchison (Dallas)	Republican	Jun 14, 1993 – Jan 3, 2013	Re-elected in 2000.	27	109th	28	Elected in 2002.	Dec 2, 2002 – present	Republican	John Cornyn (Austin)	15
18	Kay Bailey Hutchison (Dallas)	Republican	Jun 14, 1993 – Jan 3, 2013	Re-elected in 2006. Retired.	28	110th	28	Elected in 2002.	Dec 2, 2002 – present	Republican	John Cornyn (Austin)	15
18	Kay Bailey Hutchison (Dallas)	Republican	Jun 14, 1993 – Jan 3, 2013	Re-elected in 2006. Retired.	28	111th	29	Re-elected in 2008.	Dec 2, 2002 – present	Republican	John Cornyn (Austin)	15
18	Kay Bailey Hutchison (Dallas)	Republican	Jun 14, 1993 – Jan 3, 2013	Re-elected in 2006. Retired.	28	112th	29	Re-elected in 2008.	Dec 2, 2002 – present	Republican	John Cornyn (Austin)	15
19	Ted Cruz (Houston)	Republican	Jan 3, 2013 – present	Elected in 2012.	29	113th	29	Re-elected in 2008.	Dec 2, 2002 – present	Republican	John Cornyn (Austin)	15
19	Ted Cruz (Houston)	Republican	Jan 3, 2013 – present	Elected in 2012.	29	114th	30	Re-elected in 2014.	Dec 2, 2002 – present	Republican	John Cornyn (Austin)	15
19	Ted Cruz (Houston)	Republican	Jan 3, 2013 – present	Elected in 2012.	29	115th	30	Re-elected in 2014.	Dec 2, 2002 – present	Republican	John Cornyn (Austin)	15
19	Ted Cruz (Houston)	Republican	Jan 3, 2013 – present	Re-elected in 2018.	30	116th	30	Re-elected in 2014.	Dec 2, 2002 – present	Republican	John Cornyn (Austin)	15
19	Ted Cruz (Houston)	Republican	Jan 3, 2013 – present	Re-elected in 2018.	30	117th	31	Re-elected in 2020. Lost renomination.	Dec 2, 2002 – present	Republican	John Cornyn (Austin)	15
19	Ted Cruz (Houston)	Republican	Jan 3, 2013 – present	Re-elected in 2018.	30	118th	31	Re-elected in 2020. Lost renomination.	Dec 2, 2002 – present	Republican	John Cornyn (Austin)	15
19	Ted Cruz (Houston)	Republican	Jan 3, 2013 – present	Re-elected in 2024.	31	119th	31	Re-elected in 2020. Lost renomination.	Dec 2, 2002 – present	Republican	John Cornyn (Austin)	15
19	Ted Cruz (Houston)	Republican	Jan 3, 2013 – present	Re-elected in 2024.	31	120th	32	Elected in 2026.	Taking office Jan 3, 2027	Democratic	James Talarico (elect) (Austin)	16
19	Ted Cruz (Houston)	Republican	Jan 3, 2013 – present	Re-elected in 2024.	31	121st	32	Elected in 2026.	Taking office Jan 3, 2027	Democratic	James Talarico (elect) (Austin)	16
To be determined in the 2030 election.					32	122nd	32	Elected in 2026.	Taking office Jan 3, 2027	Democratic	James Talarico (elect) (Austin)	16
To be determined in the 2030 election.					32	123rd	33	To be determined in the 2032 election.				

== See also ==
- Elections in Texas
- List of United States representatives from Texas
- Texas's congressional delegations
