= Rienzi Melville Johnston =

American politician (1849–1926)

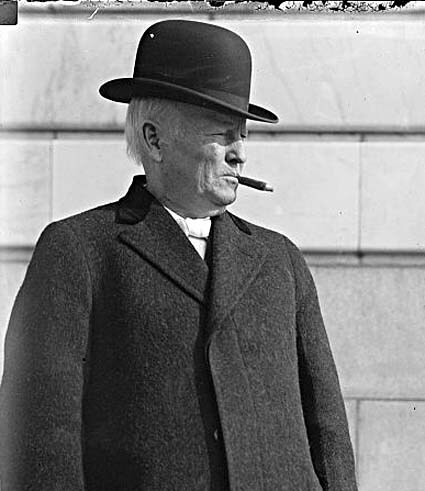

United States Senator from Texas
- In office January 4, 1913 – January 29, 1913
- Appointed by: Oscar Branch Colquitt
- Preceded by: Joseph W. Bailey
- Succeeded by: Morris Sheppard

Personal details
- Born: September 9, 1849 Sandersville, Georgia, U.S.
- Died: February 28, 1926 (aged 76) Houston, Texas, U.S.
- Resting place: Glenwood Cemetery
- Party: Democratic

Rienzi Melville Johnston (September 9, 1849 – February 28, 1926) was an American journalist and politician. He edited the Houston Post from 1885 to 1919, and served a 29-day term in the United States Senate in January 1913 after the resignation of Joseph Weldon Bailey. His term remains the fifth shortest in Senate history. Johnston was a member of the Texas Senate from 1917 to 1920, and also its President pro tempore from 1918.

== Early life ==
Johnston was born in Sandersville, Georgia, on September 9, 1849 (some sources say 1850). He was born the son of Freeman W. Johnston and his wife Mary J. (née Russell). In his early years, Johnston worked in a print shop, but at the age of 12 was enlisted as a drummer in the Confederate States Army, serving a year from 1862 to 1863. After being discharged, he re-enlisted in 1864 and served until the end of the war. After the war, he returned to newspaper work.

== Newspaper career ==
In the early 1870s, Johnston became editor of the Savannah Morning News. He traveled to Texas in 1878, where he took on the editorship of the Crockett Patron. After a year at the Patron, he went on to edit the Corsicana Observer and established the Independent there. In 1880, Johnston moved to Austin, where he wrote for the Austin Statesman. The Houston Post also enlisted him to serve as a correspondent to cover the state capital.

After a reorganization in 1885, Johnston was chosen as the new editor-in-chief of the Houston Post, and later became president of the Houston Printing Company. As a noted editorial writer, Johnston was frequently quoted by other newspapers across the United States. He also served as the first Vice President of the Associated Press for two years.

== Political career ==
Johnston, through his newspaper influence, became a leader of the Democratic Party in Texas. He declined the nomination for Lieutenant Governor of Texas in 1898. From 1900 to 1912, he served as a member of the Democratic National Committee.

At the beginning of January 1913, Oscar Branch Colquitt, Governor of Texas, appointed Johnston to the United States Senate to fill the unexpired term of Joseph W. Bailey. Johnston served a brief term, from January 4, to January 29, 1913. Johnston's 29-day term is the second shortest in Senate history, behind John N. Heiskell's 24 days. Elected to replace Johnston was Morris Sheppard who would go on to introduce the Eighteenth Amendment to the Senate, implementing the nationwide prohibition of alcohol. Following his Senate term, Johnston returned to Houston and resumed his role as editor of the Post. He retired from the newspaper business in 1919.

In 1916, Johnston was elected to the Texas Senate, representing Houston. He served in office from January 9, 1917, to January 12, 1920, through the 35th and 36th sessions of the legislature. On March 27, 1918, Johnston was elected as President pro tempore of the Senate. During the 36th legislature, Johnston was chair of the Towns and City Corporations Committee and vice chair of the Public Printing Committee. He resigned his seat in 1920, having been appointed by Governor William P. Hobby as Chairman of the State Prison Commission. In a special election, Lynch Davidson, later a state Lieutenant Governor, won Johnston's former seat.

A collection of Johnston's papers is held at Rice University in Houston. His name has also been given to Rienzi, the Museum of Fine Arts, Houston's house museum for European decorative arts. The house formerly belonged to Johnston's grandson, Harris Masterson III.

== Personal life ==
Johnston married Mary E. Parsons in 1875, and they had three children. He died on February 28, 1926, and was buried in Glenwood Cemetery, Houston.

Texas Senate
Preceded by Louis H. Bailey	Texas State Senator from District 16; 1917–1920	Succeeded by Lynch Davidson
U.S. Senate
Preceded by Joseph W. Bailey	U.S. senator (Class 2) from Texas; 1913	Succeeded by Morris Sheppard
