= 1930 United States Senate election in Texas =

- November 4, 1930
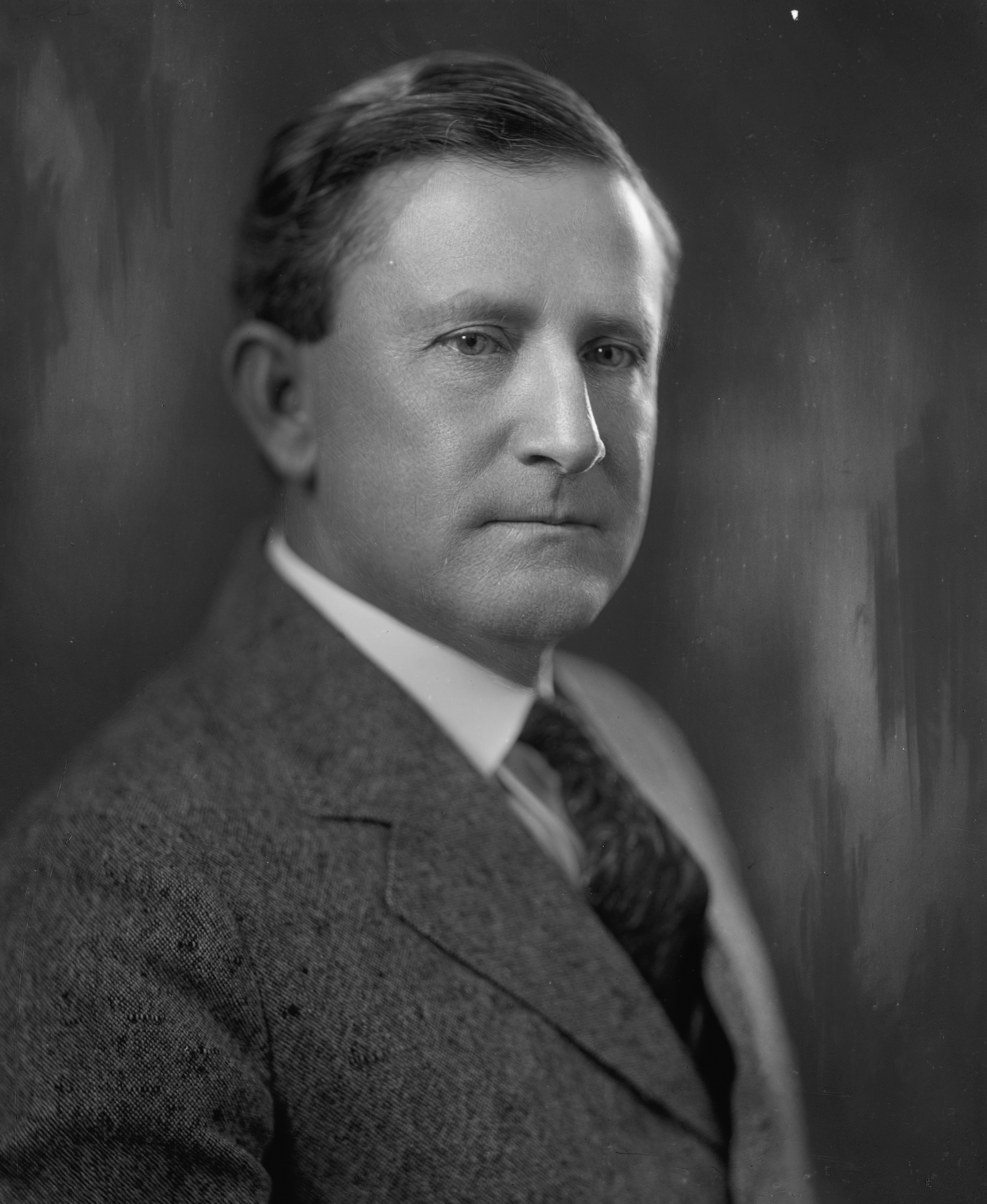

Nominee	Morris Sheppard	Doran J. Haesly
Party	Democratic	Republican
Popular vote	266,550	39,047
Percentage	86.91%	12.73%
- County results Sheppard: 40–50% 50–60% 60–70% 70–80% 80–90% >90% Haesly: 50–60% 60–70% No votes
U.S. senator before election
Morris Sheppard
Democratic
Elected U.S. Senator
Morris Sheppard
Democratic

The 1930 United States Senate election in Texas was held on November 4, 1930. Incumbent Democratic U.S. Senator Morris Sheppard was re-elected to a fourth term in office, easily dispatching his challengers.

== Democratic primary ==
=== Candidates ===
- Robert Lee Henry, former U.S. Representative from Waco
- C. A. Mitchner
- Morris Sheppard, incumbent Senator since 1913

=== Results ===
1930 United States Senate election in Texas
Party	Candidate	Votes	%
Democratic	Morris Sheppard (incumbent)	526,293	71.06%
Democratic	Robert Lee Henry	174,260	23.53%
Democratic	C. A. Mitchner	40,130	5.42%
Total votes		740,683	100.00%

== Republican primary ==
Because of the Republican ticket's over performance in the 1928 governor's race, the party held its second primary in state history on July 26, 1930, for all statewide offices, including Senator.

=== Candidates ===
- Doran John Haesly (Dallas)
- Harve H. Haines (Port Arthur)
- C. O. Harris (San Angelo)

=== Results ===
1930 United States Senate Republican primary in Texas
Party	Candidate	Votes	%
Republican	Doran John Haesly	3,645	40.51%
Republican	C. O. Harris	2,784	30.94%
Republican	Harve H. Haines	2,568	28.54%
Total votes		8,997	100.00%

Harris refused to participate in the runoff, causing Haesly to win by default.

== General election ==
Sixteen counties failed to report their results to the Texas Secretary of State in time to be canvassed, so their results are not included in the official vote totals.

=== Results ===
1930 United States Senate election in Texas
Party	Candidate	Votes	%	±%
Democratic	Morris Sheppard (incumbent)	266,550	86.91%	▲1.51
Republican	Doran J. Haesly	39,047	12.73%	▼1.87
Socialist	Guy L. Smith	808	0.26%	N/A
Communist	W.A. Berry	296	0.10%	N/A
Total votes		306,701	100.00%	
Democratic hold				

== See also ==
- 1930 United States Senate elections
