= 1936 United States Senate election in Texas =

- November 3, 1936
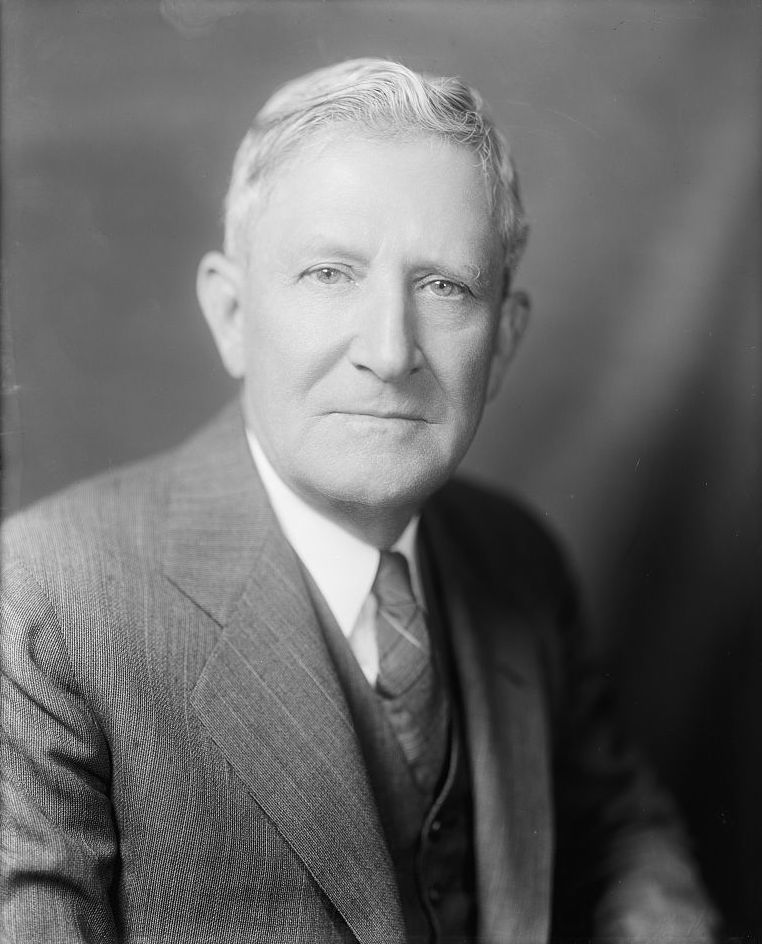

Nominee	Morris Sheppard	Carlos Watson
Party	Democratic	Republican
Popular vote	774,975	59,491
Percentage	92.56%	7.11%
- County results Sheppard: 70–80% 80–90% >90% Watson: 40–50% 50–60% No votes
U.S. senator before election
Morris Sheppard
Democratic
Elected U.S. Senator
Morris Sheppard
Democratic

The 1936 United States Senate election in Texas was held on November 3, 1936. Incumbent Democratic U.S. Senator Morris Sheppard was re-elected to a fifth term in office, easily dispatching his challengers.

== Democratic primary ==
=== Candidates ===
- Richard C. Bush
- Joe Eagle, U.S. Representative from Houston
- Guy B. Fisher
- J. Ed Glenn
- Joseph H. Price
- Morris Sheppard, incumbent Senator since 1913

=== Results ===
1936 United States Senate election in Texas
Party	Candidate	Votes	%
Democratic	Morris Sheppard (incumbent)	616,293	64.56%
Democratic	Joe Eagle	136,718	14.32%
Democratic	Guy B. Fisher	89,215	9.35%
Democratic	Joseph H. Price	45,919	4.81%
Democratic	Richard C. Bush	37,842	3.96%
Democratic	J. Ed Glenn	28,641	3.00%
Total votes		954,628	100.00%

== General election ==
=== Results ===
1936 United States Senate election in Texas
Party	Candidate	Votes	%	±%
Democratic	Morris Sheppard (incumbent)	774,975	92.56%	▲5.65
Republican	Carlos G. Watson	59,491	7.11%	▼5.62
Union	Gertrude Wilson	1,836	0.22%	N/A
Socialist	William Burr Starr	958	0.11%	▼0.15
Total votes		837,260	100.00%	
Democratic hold				

== See also ==
- 1936 United States Senate elections
