= David B. Culberson =

American politician (1830–1900)

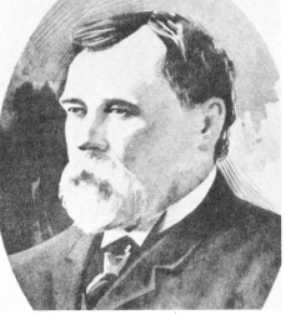

Chairman of the House Democratic Caucus
- In office March 4, 1895 – March 3, 1897
- Speaker: Thomas Brackett Reed
- Preceded by: William S. Holman
- Succeeded by: James D. Richardson

Member of the U.S. House of Representatives from Texas
- In office March 4, 1875 – March 3, 1897
- Preceded by: William P. McLean
- Succeeded by: John W. Cranford
- Constituency: 2nd district (1875–83); 4th district (1883–97)

Member of the Texas Senate from the 7th district
- In office January 13, 1874 – March 3, 1875
- Preceded by: Henry Rawson
- Succeeded by: James Postell Douglas

Member of the Texas House of Representatives
- In office November 7, 1859 – February 11, 1861
- Constituency: 16th district
- In office October 17, 1864 – August 6, 1866
- Constituency: 20th district

Personal details
- Born: September 29, 1830 Troup County, Georgia, U.S.
- Died: May 7, 1900 (aged 69) Jefferson, Texas, U.S.
- Resting place: Jefferson, Texas, U.S.
- Party: Democratic
- Education: Brownwood Institute
- Profession: Lawyer, Politician

Military service
- Allegiance: Confederate States of America
- Branch/service: Confederate States Army
- Years of service: 1861–1864
- Rank: Lieutenant Colonel
- Battles/wars: American Civil War

David Browning Culberson (September 29, 1830 – May 7, 1900) was a Confederate soldier, a Democratic U.S. Representative from Texas and Chairman of the House Judiciary Committee.

== Early years ==
Culberson was born in Troup County, Georgia, on September 29, 1830, the son of David B. and Lucy (Wilkerson) Culberson. After leaving Brownwood Institute in La Grange, Georgia, he read law at Tuskegee, Alabama, in the school of William P. Chilton, Chief Justice of Alabama. He was admitted to the bar in 1850 and began practice in Dadeville, Alabama. In 1856, he moved to Texas and settled in Upshur County, where he practiced law in partnership with Gen. Hinche P. Mabry until 1861, when he moved to nearby Jefferson, Texas. On December 8, 1852, he married Eugenia Kimball; they had two sons, one of whom, Charles A. Culberson, became Governor of Texas and later U.S. Senator. Culberson was a Mason and an Odd Fellow.

== Political career and military service ==
Culberson was a member of the Texas Legislature from Upshur County during the 1859-60 session. Because Culberson opposed secession and his district favored it, he resigned his legislative seat. Despite his views on secession, when Texas did secede, Culberson raised the 18th Texas Infantry, and he became its commander with the rank of lieutenant colonel. The 18th Infantry saw combat at Vicksburg in 1862–63, but Culberson's health deteriorated and he was assigned to Austin as Adjutant General of Texas. In 1864, he was elected to the legislature from Cass, Titus, and Bowie counties and resigned his military position to rejoin the legislature.

As a prominent Jefferson lawyer he was one of the defense attorneys in the Stockade Case of 1869, and he helped defend accused murderer Abe Rothschild in the Diamond Bessie murder trial. He worked to obtain the acquittal for treason of the then 16-year-old William Jesse McDonald, then of Rusk County, the later Texas Ranger. Culberson attended the Democratic state convention in 1868 and served as a presidential elector in the Presidential Election of 1872 pledged to Horace Greeley (who died before Texas' electoral votes could be cast) but casting his ballot ultimately for Benjamin Gratz Brown. Culberson was elected to the State Senate in 1873 representing Marion, Cass and Bowie Counties. In 1874, he ran for Congress from the 2nd District of Texas, and won. He resigned his Senate seat to go to Washington.

== In Congress ==
Culberson served in the United States House of Representatives from 1875 to 1897, supporting prohibition and opposing federal interference in state government. In 1876, he favored the repeal of the Specie Act, and in 1888 he introduced antitrust legislation in Congress. He represented both the 2nd and later the 4th district and served as Chairman of the Judiciary Committee.

Though in many ways, a populist himself, Culberson campaigned against the Populist Party which was quite strong in Texas in the 1890s. Culberson viewed them as a divisive force in state politics.

== Final years ==
He was appointed by President William McKinley on June 21, 1897, as one of the commissioners to codify the laws of the United States and served in this capacity until his death in Jefferson, Texas on May 7, 1900. He was interred in Jefferson.

Texas Senate
Preceded by Henry Rawson	Texas State Senator from District 7 (Jefferson); 1874-1875	Succeeded by James Postell Douglas
U.S. House of Representatives
Preceded by William P. McLean	Member of the U.S. House of Representatives from Texas's 2nd congressional district 1875-1883	Succeeded by John H. Reagan
Preceded by Roger Q. Mills	Member of the U.S. House of Representatives from Texas's 4th congressional district 1883-1897	Succeeded by John W. Cranford
Political offices
Preceded by John R. Tucker	Chairman of the House Judiciary Committee; 1887–1889	Succeeded by Ezra Taylor
Preceded by Ezra Taylor	Chairman of the House Judiciary Committee; 1891–1895	Succeeded by David B. Henderson
