= John W. Cranford =

American politician (1859–1899)

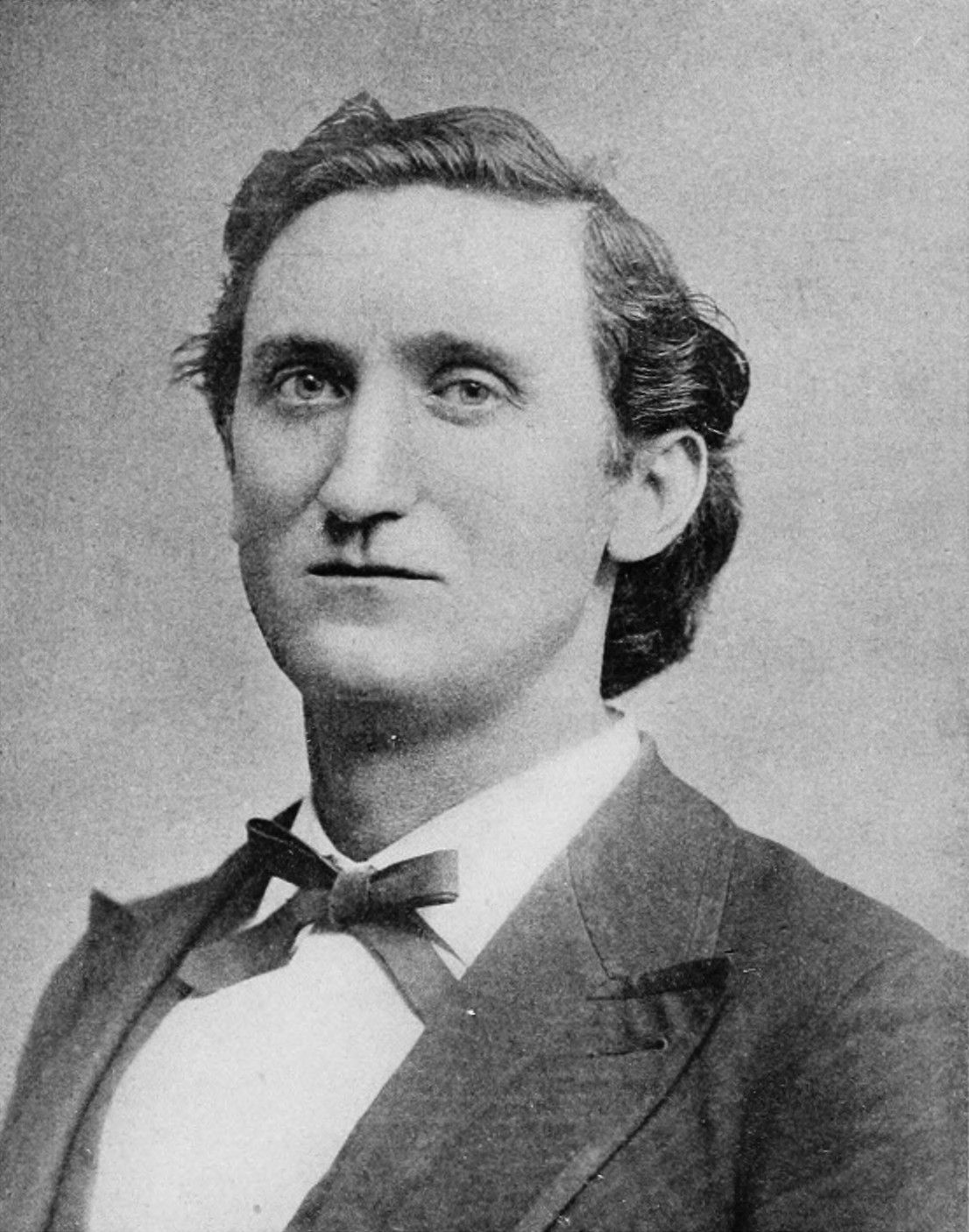

Member of the U.S. House of Representatives from Texas's 4th district
- In office March 4, 1897 – March 3, 1899
- Preceded by: David B. Culberson
- Succeeded by: John L. Sheppard

President pro tempore of the Texas Senate
- In office 1890–1891
- Preceded by: William Henry Burges
- Succeeded by: Ernst Gustav Maetze

Member of the Texas Senate from the 5th district
- In office 1888–1896

Personal details
- Born: John Walter Cranford; July 28, 1859 Grove Hill, Alabama
- Died: March 3, 1899 (aged 39) Washington, D.C., U.S.
- Party: Democratic
- Spouse: Medora Ury (m. 1880)

John Walter Cranford (July 28, 1859 – March 3, 1899) was an American attorney and politician from Texas. A Democrat, he was most notable for his service as president pro tem of the Texas Senate and a member of the United States House of Representatives.

== Biography ==
Cranford was born near Grove Hill, Alabama, on July 28, 1859, the son of Dr. James H. Cranford and Caroline (Bettis) Cranford. He received his initial education in Alabama, and after the end of the American Civil War in 1865, Cranford's parents moved to Hopkins County, Texas. Cranford's mother and father died when he was about 13 years of age, and he was left to raise himself.

After moving to Texas, Cranford attended the schools of Hopkins County and studied under a private tutor, and worked a variety of jobs to earn room and board and tuition. He studied law under a local attorney, attained admission to the bar, and established a practice in Sulphur Springs, Texas.

In 1888, Cranford won election to the Texas Senate representing the 5th district (Hunt, Hopkins, Delta, Franklin, and Camp Counties). He served until 1896, and was chairman of the committees on State Affairs and Engrossed Bills. Cranford was the senate's president pro tem from 1890 to 1891.

Cranford was elected to the 55th United States Congress in 1896. He served from March 4, 1897, until his death in Washington, D.C., on March 3, 1899, which was also the final day of his term. He was interred in the City Cemetery, Sulphur Springs, Texas.

== Family ==
In 1880, Cranford married Medora Ury of Sulphur Springs.

== See also ==
- List of members of the United States Congress who died in office (1790–1899)

U.S. House of Representatives
Preceded by David B. Culberson	Member of the U.S. House of Representatives from Texas's 4th congressional district 1897–1899	Succeeded by John L. Sheppard
