= Joseph W. Bailey =

American politician (1862–1929)

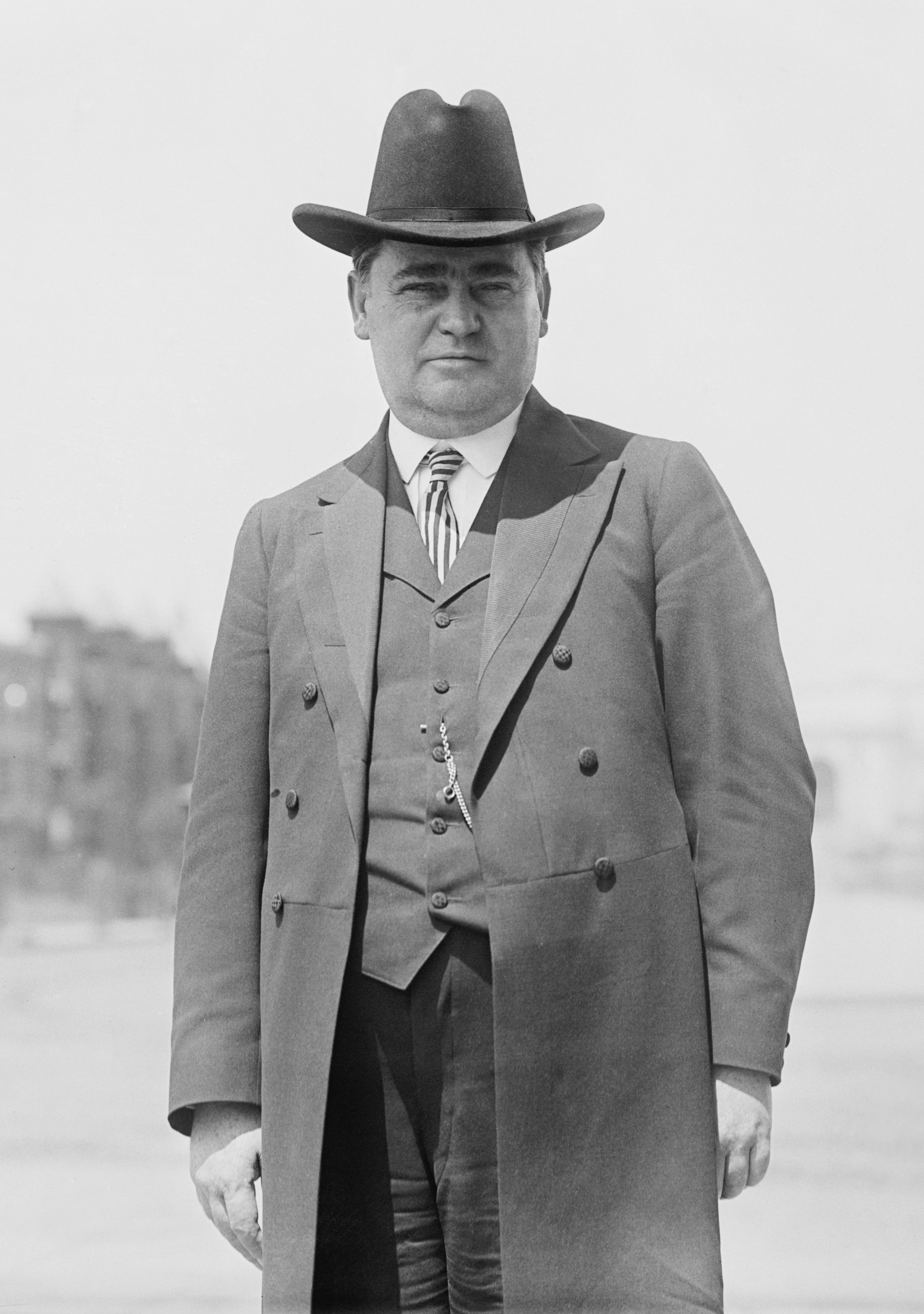
- Joseph Bailey c. 1910 to 1915

United States Senator from Texas
- In office March 4, 1901 – January 3, 1913
- Preceded by: Horace Chilton
- Succeeded by: Rienzi M. Johnston

House Minority Leader
- In office March 4, 1897 – March 3, 1899
- Preceded by: Office Established
- Succeeded by: James D. Richardson

Member of the U.S. House of Representatives from Texas's 5th district
- In office March 4, 1891 – March 3, 1901
- Preceded by: Silas Hare
- Succeeded by: Choice B. Randell

Personal details
- Born: Joseph Weldon Bailey; October 6, 1862 Crystal Springs, Mississippi, C.S.A.
- Died: April 13, 1929 (aged 66) Sherman, Texas, U.S.
- Resting place: Fairview Cemetery in Gainesville, Texas, U.S.
- Party: Democratic
- Education: University of Mississippi
- Occupation: Lawyer and politician

Joseph Weldon Bailey Sr. (October 6, 1862 – April 13, 1929), was a United States senator, member of the U.S. House of Representatives, lawyer, and Bourbon Democrat who was famous for his speeches extolling conservative causes of his time, such as opposition to woman suffrage or restrictions on child labor. He served as a Congressional Representative between 1891 and 1901, and as the House Minority leader from 1897 until 1899. In 1901, he was elected to the Senate, serving until 1913. Historian Elna C. Green says that Bailey "was known in Texas as a rigorous defender of states' rights, constitutional conservatism, and governmental economy. His opponents considered him the symbol of privilege and corruption in government."

== Biography ==
Born in Crystal Springs in Copiah County outside Jackson, Mississippi, Bailey attended the University of Mississippi at Oxford, where in 1879 he joined the prestigious Delta Psi fraternity (AKA St. Anthony Hall). He graduated with a law degree from Cumberland University in 1883 and was admitted to the bar in Mississippi that same year. He moved to Gainesville, Texas, in 1885, where he continued to practice law.

He had been politically active as a Democrat in both Mississippi and his new home and had a reputation as an excellent public speaker who promoted Jeffersonian democracy. He was elected to the House in 1891 and quickly distinguished himself as leading advocate for free silver, which contributed to his election as Minority Leader of the United States House of Representatives in 1897. He exerted considerable influence on his colleagues, but also struggled to unify his divided caucus. On April 14, 1897, some House Democrats, led by David A. De Armond sought to block a three day adjournment, a maneuver understood as a repudiation of Bailey's cooperative relationship with Republican Speaker Thomas Brackett Reed.

Bailey's most severe disappointment as minority leader came in 1898, when he argued that congressmen who had accepted commissions to serve in the army without resigning from Congress had violated the Ineligibility Clause of the Constitution. Despite Bailey's advocacy, a majority of Democrats opposed a motion to consider a resolution which would have removed several members from Congress who had simultaneously held commissions during the Spanish–American War. The next day, Bailey declared that he would not be a candidate for minority leader in the next Congress.

He was elected to the U.S. Senate in 1901. His political career was tarnished by an assault against Senator Albert J. Beveridge, an Indiana Republican. Subsequent investigations brought to light suspicious income and financial ties that Bailey had to the burgeoning oil industry. Nevertheless, financial allegations against Bailey in 1906 threatened his reelection to the Senate, a task then the prerogative of the Texas legislature, rather than party voters. His tenure ended on January 3, 1913 when he resigned his Senate seat.

After his defeat by Pat M. Neff in the Democratic gubernatorial primary in 1920, Bailey moved to Dallas to practice law. On April 13, 1929, he died in a courtroom in Sherman, Texas, having just sat down after completing an argument.

U.S. House of Representatives
Preceded by New Title	House Minority Leader; 1897–1899	Succeeded by James D. Richardson; Tennessee
Preceded by Silas Hare	Member of the U.S. House of Representatives from Texas's 5th congressional district 1891–1901	Succeeded by Choice B. Randell
U.S. Senate
Preceded by Horace Chilton	U.S. Senator (Class 2) from Texas; 1901–1913	Succeeded by Rienzi M. Johnston
