= 1918 United States Senate election in Texas =

- November 5, 1918
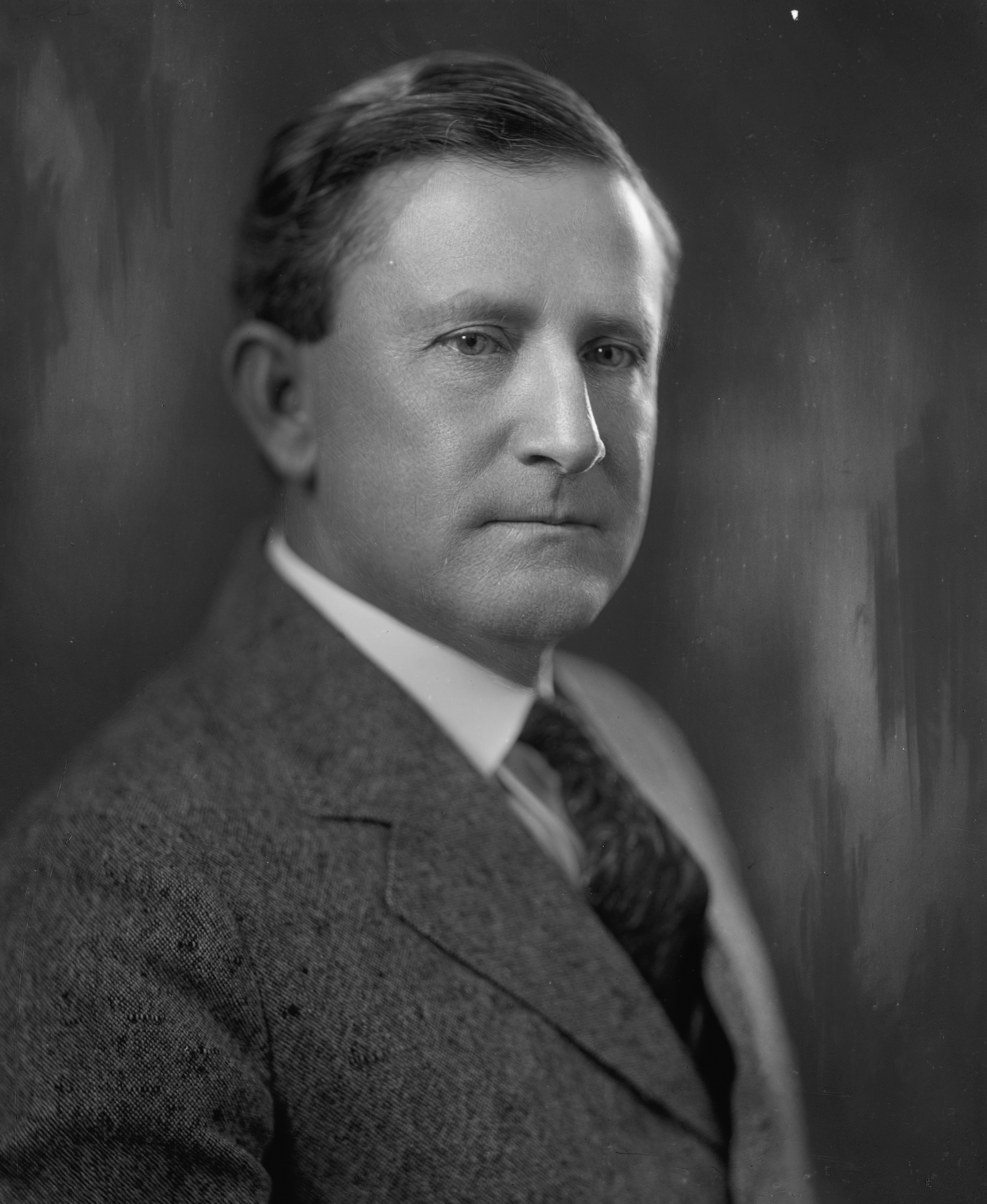

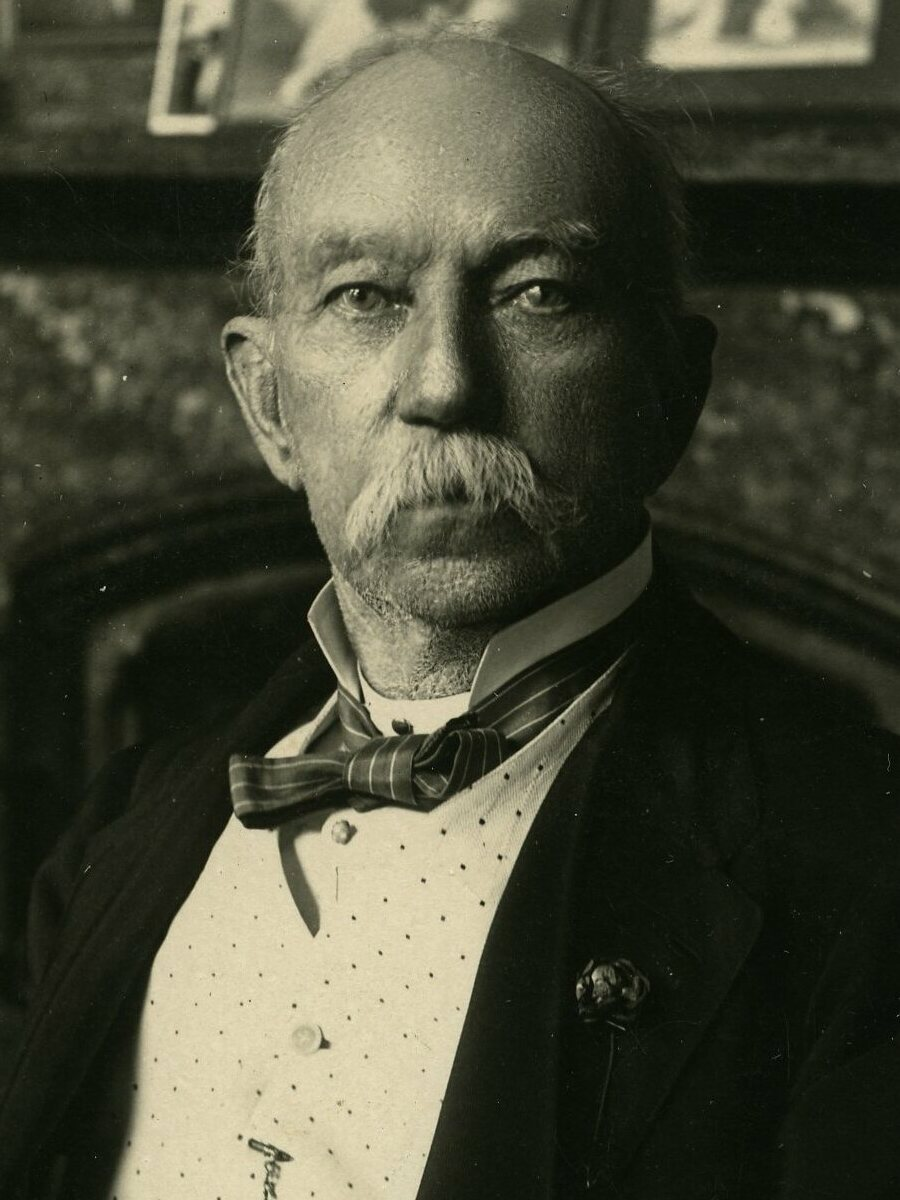
Nominee	Morris Sheppard	Webster Flanagan
Party	Democratic	Republican
Popular vote	155,178	22,214
Percentage	86.69%	12.41%
- County results Sheppard: 50–60% 60–70% 70–80% 80–90% >90% Flanagan: 50–60% 60–70% No votes
U.S. senator before election
Morris Sheppard
Democratic
Elected U.S. Senator
Morris Sheppard
Democratic

The 1918 United States Senate election in Texas was held on November 5, 1918. Incumbent Democratic U.S. Senator Morris Sheppard was re-elected to a second term in office easily.

== General election ==
=== Results ===
1918 United States Senate election in Texas
Party	Candidate	Votes	%
Democratic	Morris Sheppard (incumbent)	155,178	86.69%
Republican	J. Webster Flanagan	22,214	12.41%
Socialist	M. A. Smith	1,608	0.90%
Total votes		179,000	100.00%
Democratic hold			

== See also ==
- 1918 United States Senate elections
