= John L. Sheppard =

American politician (1852–1902)

John Levi Sheppard
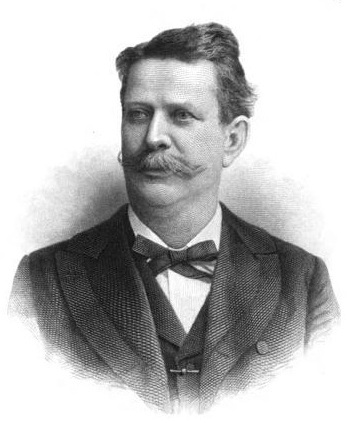

Member of the U.S. House of Representatives from Texas's 4th district
- In office March 4, 1899 – October 11, 1902
- Preceded by: John W. Cranford
- Succeeded by: Morris Sheppard

Personal details
- Born: April 13, 1852 Bluffton, Alabama, U.S.
- Died: October 11, 1902 (aged 50) Texarkana, Texas, U.S.
- Party: Democratic
- Spouse: Margaret Alice Eddins
- Children: Morris Sheppard
- Relatives: Connie Mack III (great-grandson); Connie Mack IV (great-great-grandson); Richard S. Arnold (great-grandson); Morris S. Arnold (great-grandson)
- Profession: lawyer, judge, legislator

John Levi Sheppard (April 13, 1852 – October 11, 1902) was an American lawyer, judge, and legislator.

== Biography ==
Sheppard was born in Bluffton, Alabama on April 13, 1852. As a child he moved with his mother to Morris County, Texas, where he attended the local schools. Sheppard then studied law, was admitted to the bar in 1879, and began to practice in Daingerfield.

A Democrat, Sheppard served as district attorney of the fifth judicial district from 1882 to 1888, and district judge from 1888 to 1896. He was temporary chairman of the state Democratic convention in 1892, and a delegate to the 1893 Bimettalist convention. He was also a delegate to the 1896 Democratic National Convention.

In 1898 Sheppard was elected to the United States House of Representatives from the Fourth Congressional District of Texas. He served in the 56th and 57th Congresses, and held office from March 4, 1899 until his death.

Sheppard died in Texarkana, Texas on October 11, 1902. He was buried at Rose Hill Cemetery in Texarkana.

== Family ==
Sheppard was married to Margaret Alice Eddins (1854-1905). Their children included Morris Sheppard, an attorney who was in practice with his father. He was elected to Congress in the seat his father had filled, and later elected by the state legislature as United States Senator from Texas, serving for decades.

Sheppard was the great-grandfather of Senator Connie Mack III and great-great-grandfather of Representative Connie Mack IV, both of Florida.

== See also ==
- List of members of the United States Congress who died in office (1900–1949)

U.S. House of Representatives
Preceded by John Walter Cranford	Member of the U.S. House of Representatives from Texas's 4th congressional district 1899–1902	Succeeded by John Morris Sheppard
