= List of United States representatives from Texas =

The following is an alphabetical list of United States representatives from the state of Texas. For chronological tables of members of both houses of the United States Congress from the state (through the present day), see Texas's congressional delegations. The list of names should be complete as of April 14, 2026, but other data may be incomplete.

== Current members ==
As of April 14, 2026:

- 1st district: Nathaniel Moran (R) (since 2023)
- 2nd district: Dan Crenshaw (R) (since 2019)
- 3rd district: Keith Self (R) (since 2023)
- 4th district: Pat Fallon (R) (since 2021)
- 5th district: Lance Gooden (R) (since 2019)
- 6th district: Jake Ellzey (R) (since 2021)
- 7th district: Lizzie Fletcher (D) (since 2019)
- 8th district: Morgan Luttrell (R) (since 2023)
- 9th district: Al Green (D) (since 2005)
- 10th district: Michael McCaul (R) (since 2005)
- 11th district: August Pfluger (R) (since 2021)
- 12th district: Craig Goldman (R) (since 2025)
- 13th district: Ronny Jackson (R) (since 2021)
- 14th district: Randy Weber (R) (since 2013)
- 15th district: Monica De La Cruz (R) (since 2023)
- 16th district: Veronica Escobar (D) (since 2019)
- 17th district: Pete Sessions (R) (since 2021)
- 18th district: Christian Menefee (D) (since 2026)
- 19th district: Jodey Arrington (R) (since 2017)
- 20th district: Joaquin Castro (D) (since 2013)
- 21st district: Chip Roy (R) (since 2019)
- 22nd district: Troy Nehls (R) (since 2021)
- 23rd district: Vacant (since 2026)
- 24th district: Beth Van Duyne (R) (since 2021)
- 25th district: Roger Williams (R) (since 2013)
- 26th district: Brandon Gill (R) (since 2025)
- 27th district: Michael Cloud (R) (since 2018)
- 28th district: Henry Cuellar (D) (since 2005)
- 29th district: Sylvia Garcia (D) (since 2019)
- 30th district: Jasmine Crockett (D) (since 2023)
- 31st district: John Carter (R) (since 2003)
- 32nd district: Julie Johnson (D) (since 2025)
- 33rd district: Marc Veasey (D) (since 2013)
- 34th district: Vicente Gonzalez (D) (since 2017)
- 35th district: Greg Casar (D) (since 2023)
- 36th district: Brian Babin (R) (since 2015)
- 37th district: Lloyd Doggett (D) (since 1995)
- 38th district: Wesley Hunt (R) (since 2023)

== List of members ==
| Member | Party | Years | District | Residence | Electoral history |
|---|---|---|---|---|---|
| Joseph Abbott | Democratic | March 4, 1887 – March 3, 1897 | 6th | Hillsboro | Elected in 1886. Retired. |
| Bruce Alger | Republican | January 3, 1955 – January 3, 1965 | 5th | Dallas | Elected in 1954. Lost re-election. |
| Colin Allred | Democratic | January 3, 2019 – January 3, 2025 | 32nd | Dallas | Elected in 2018. Retired to run for U.S. Senator. |
| Michael A. Andrews | Democratic | January 3, 1983 – January 3, 1995 | 25th | Houston | Elected in 1982. Retired to run for U.S. Senator. |
| Edwin Le Roy Antony | Democratic | June 14, 1892 – March 3, 1893 | 9th | Cameron | Elected to finish Mills's term. Retired. |
| Bill Archer | Republican | January 3, 1971 – January 3, 2001 | 7th | Houston | Elected in 1970. Retired. |
| Dick Armey | Republican | January 3, 1985 – January 3, 2003 | 26th | Irving | Elected in 1984. Retired. |
| Jodey Arrington | Republican | January 3, 2017 – present | 19th | Lubbock | Elected in 2016. Incumbent. |
| Brian Babin | Republican | January 3, 2015 – present | 36th | Woodville | Elected in 2014. Incumbent. |
| Joseph Weldon Bailey | Democratic | March 4, 1891 – March 3, 1901 | 5th | Gainesville | Elected in 1890. Retired to run for U.S. Senator. |
| Joseph Weldon Bailey Jr. | Democratic | March 4, 1933 – January 3, 1935 | At-large | Dallas | Elected in 1932. Redistricted to the 19th district and retired to run for U.S. Senator. |
| Thomas Henry Ball | Democratic | March 4, 1897 – March 3, 1903 | 1st | Huntsville | Elected in 1896. Redistricted to the 8th district. |
| Thomas Henry Ball | Democratic | March 4, 1903 – November 16, 1903 | 8th | Huntsville | Redistricted from the 1st district and re-elected in 1902. Resigned. |
| Steve Bartlett | Republican | January 3, 1983 – March 11, 1991 | 3rd | Dallas | Elected in 1982. Resigned to when elected Mayor of Dallas. |
| Joe Barton | Republican | January 3, 1985 – January 3, 2019 | 6th | Ennis | Elected in 1984. Retired. |
| James Andrew Beall | Democratic | March 4, 1903 – March 3, 1915 | 5th | Waxahachie | Elected in 1902. Retired. |
| Lindley Beckworth | Democratic | January 3, 1939 – January 3, 1953 | 3rd | Gladewater | Elected in 1938. Retired to run for U.S. Senator. |
| Lindley Beckworth | Democratic | January 3, 1957 – January 3, 1967 | 3rd | Gladewater | Elected in 1956. Lost renomination. |
| Carlos Bee | Democratic | March 4, 1919 – March 3, 1921 | 14th | San Antonio | Elected in 1918. Lost re-election. |
| Charles K. Bell | Democratic | March 4, 1893 – March 3, 1897 | 8th | Fort Worth | Elected in 1892. Retired. |
| Chris Bell | Democratic | January 3, 2003 – January 3, 2005 | 25th | Houston | Elected in 2002. Redistricted to the 9th district and lost renomination. |
| John J. Bell | Democratic | January 3, 1955 – January 3, 1957 | 14th | Cuero | Elected in 1954. Lost renomination. |
| Peter Hansborough Bell | Democratic | March 4, 1853 – March 3, 1857 | 2nd | Austin | Elected in 1853. Lost re-election. |
| Ken Bentsen | Democratic | January 3, 1995 – January 3, 2003 | 25th | Houston | Elected in 1994. Retired to run for U.S. Senator. |
| Lloyd Bentsen | Democratic | December 4, 1948 – January 3, 1955 | 15th | McAllen | Elected to finish West's term. Retired. |
| Eugene Black | Democratic | March 4, 1915 – March 3, 1929 | 1st | Clarksville | Elected in 1914. Retired. |
| Thomas L. Blanton | Democratic | March 4, 1917 – March 3, 1919 | 16th | Abilene | Elected in 1916. Redistricted to the 17th district. |
| Thomas L. Blanton | Democratic | March 4, 1919 – March 3, 1929 | 17th | Abilene | Redistricted from the 16th district. Retired to run for U.S. Senator. |
| Thomas L. Blanton | Democratic | May 20, 1930 – January 3, 1937 | 17th | Abilene | Elected to finish Lee's term. Lost renomination. |
| Henry Bonilla | Republican | January 3, 1993 – January 3, 2007 | 23rd | San Antonio | Elected in 1992. Lost re-election. |
| Beau Boulter | Republican | January 3, 1985 – January 3, 1989 | 13th | Amarillo | Elected in 1984. Retired to run for U.S. Senator. |
| John C. Box | Democratic | March 4, 1919 – March 3, 1931 | 2nd | Jacksonville | Elected in 1918. Lost renomination. |
| Kevin Brady | Republican | January 3, 1997 – January 3, 2023 | 8th | The Woodlands | Elected in 1996. Redistricted to the 2nd district and retired. |
| Clay Stone Briggs | Democratic | March 4, 1919 – April 29, 1933 | 7th | Galveston | Elected in 1918. Died. |
| Moses L. Broocks | Democratic | March 4, 1905 – March 3, 1907 | 2nd | San Augustine | Elected in 1904. Retired. |
| Jack Brooks | Democratic | January 3, 1953 – January 3, 1967 | 2nd | Beaumont | Elected in 1952. Redistricted to the 9th district. |
| Jack Brooks | Democratic | January 3, 1967 – January 3, 1995 | 9th | Beaumont | Redistricted from the 2nd district and re-elected in 1966. Lost re-election. |
| Guy M. Bryan | Democratic | March 4, 1857 – March 3, 1859 | 2nd | Brazoria | Elected in 1857. Retired. |
| John Bryant | Democratic | January 3, 1983 – January 3, 1997 | 5th | Dallas | Elected in 1982. Retired to run for U.S. Senator. |
| James P. Buchanan | Democratic | April 15, 1913 – February 22, 1937 | 10th | Brenham | Elected to finish A. Burleson's term. Died. |
| George Farmer Burgess | Democratic | March 4, 1901 – March 3, 1903 | 10th | Gonzales | Elected in 1900. Redistricted to the 9th district. |
| George Farmer Burgess | Democratic | March 4, 1903 – March 3, 1917 | 9th | Gonzales | Redistricted from the 10th district and re-elected in 1902. Retired to run for U.S. Senator. |
| Michael C. Burgess | Republican | January 3, 2003 – January 3, 2025 | 26th | Flower Mound | Elected in 2002. Retired. |
| Robert E. Burke | Democratic | March 4, 1897 – June 5, 1901 | 6th | Dallas | Elected in 1896. Died. |
| Albert S. Burleson | Democratic | March 4, 1899 – March 3, 1903 | 9th | Austin | Elected in 1898. Redistricted to the 10th district. |
| Albert S. Burleson | Democratic | March 4, 1903 – March 6, 1913 | 10th | Austin | Redistricted from the 9th district and re-elected in 1902. Resigned to become U.S. Postmaster General. |
| Omar Burleson | Democratic | January 3, 1947 – December 31, 1978 | 17th | Anson | Elected in 1946. Resigned. |
| George H. W. Bush | Republican | January 3, 1967 – January 3, 1971 | 7th | Houston | Elected in 1966. Retired to run for U.S. Senator. |
| Albert Bustamante | Democratic | January 3, 1985 – January 3, 1993 | 23rd | San Antonio | Elected in 1984. Lost re-election. |
| Earle Cabell | Democratic | January 3, 1965 – January 3, 1973 | 5th | Dallas | Elected in 1964. Lost re-election. |
| Oscar Callaway | Democratic | March 4, 1911 – March 3, 1917 | 12th | Comanche | Elected in 1910. Lost renomination. |
| Quico Canseco | Republican | January 3, 2011 – January 3, 2013 | 23rd | San Antonio | Elected in 2010. Lost re-election. |
| John Carter | Republican | January 3, 2003 – present | 31st | Round Rock | Elected in 2002. Incumbent. |
| Greg Casar | Democratic | January 3, 2023 – present | 35th | Austin | Elected in 2022. Incumbent. |
| Robert R. Casey | Democratic | January 3, 1959 – January 22, 1976 | 22nd | Houston | Elected in 1958. Resigned to join the Federal Maritime Commission. |
| Joaquin Castro | Democratic | January 3, 2013 – present | 20th | San Antonio | Elected in 2012. Incumbent. |
| Jim Chapman | Democratic | August 3, 1985 – January 3, 1997 | 1st | Sulphur Springs | Elected to finish S. Hall's term. Retired to run for U.S. Senator. |
| William Thomas Clark | Republican | March 31, 1870 – May 13, 1872 | 3rd | Galveston | Elected to the vacant term. Lost election contest. |
| Michael Cloud | Republican | July 10, 2018 – present | 27th | Victoria | Elected to finish Farenthold's term. Incumbent. |
| Jeremiah V. Cockrell | Democratic | March 4, 1893 – March 3, 1897 | 13th | Anson | Elected in 1892. Retired. |
| Ron Coleman | Democratic | January 3, 1983 – January 3, 1997 | 16th | El Paso | Elected in 1982. Retired. |
| James M. Collins | Republican | August 24, 1968 – January 3, 1983 | 3rd | Dallas | Elected to finish Pool's term. Retired to run for U.S. Senator. |
| Larry Combest | Republican | January 3, 1985 – May 31, 2003 | 19th | Lubbock | Elected in 1984. Resigned. |
| Jesse M. Combs | Democratic | January 3, 1945 – January 3, 1953 | 2nd | Beaumont | Elected in 1944. Retired. |
| Mike Conaway | Republican | January 3, 2005 – January 3, 2021 | 11th | Midland | Elected in 2004. Retired. |
| Tom Connally | Democratic | March 4, 1917 – March 3, 1929 | 11th | Marlin | Elected in 1916. Retired to run for U.S. Senator. |
| John C. Conner | Democratic | March 31, 1870 – March 3, 1873 | 2nd | Sherman | Elected to the vacant term. Retired. |
| Samuel B. Cooper | Democratic | March 4, 1893 – March 3, 1905 | 2nd | Beaumont | Elected in 1892. Lost renomination. |
| Samuel B. Cooper | Democratic | March 4, 1907 – March 3, 1909 | 2nd | Beaumont | Elected in 1906. Lost renomination. |
| William H. Crain | Democratic | March 4, 1885 – March 3, 1893 | 7th | Cuero | Elected in 1884. Redistricted to the 11th district. |
| William H. Crain | Democratic | March 4, 1893 – February 10, 1896 | 11th | Cuero | Redistricted from the 7th district and re-elected in 1892. Died. |
| John W. Cranford | Democratic | March 4, 1897 – March 3, 1899 | 4th | Sulphur Springs | Elected in 1896. Retired. |
| Dan Crenshaw | Republican | January 3, 2019 – present | 2nd | Houston | Elected in 2018. Incumbent. |
| Jasmine Crockett | Democratic | January 3, 2023 – present | 30th | Dallas | Elected in 2022. Incumbent. |
| Oliver H. Cross | Democratic | March 4, 1929 – January 3, 1937 | 11th | Waco | Elected in 1928. Retired. |
| Miles Crowley | Democratic | March 4, 1895 – March 3, 1897 | 10th | Galveston | Elected in 1894. Retired. |
| Henry Cuellar | Democratic | January 3, 2005 – present | 28th | Laredo | Elected in 2004. Incumbent. |
| David B. Culberson | Democratic | March 4, 1875 – March 3, 1883 | 2nd | Jefferson | Elected in 1874. Redistricted to the 4th district. |
| David B. Culberson | Democratic | March 4, 1883 – March 3, 1897 | 4th | Jefferson | Redistricted from the 2nd district and re-elected in 1882. Retired. |
| John Culberson | Republican | January 3, 2001 – January 3, 2019 | 7th | Houston | Elected in 2000. Lost re-election. |
| James H. Davis | Democratic | March 4, 1915 – March 3, 1917 | At-large | Sulphur Springs | Elected in 1914. Lost renomination. |
| Reese C. De Graffenreid | Democratic | March 4, 1897 – August 29, 1902 | 3rd | Longview | Elected in 1896. Died. |
| Monica De La Cruz | Republican | January 3, 2023 – present | 15th | McAllen | Elected in 2022. Incumbent. |
| Kika de la Garza | Democratic | January 3, 1965 – January 3, 1997 | 15th | Mission | Elected in 1964. Retired. |
| Edward Degener | Republican | March 31, 1870 – March 3, 1871 | 4th | San Antonio | Elected to the vacant term. Lost renomination. |
| Tom DeLay | Republican | January 3, 1985 – June 9, 2006 | 22nd | Sugar Land | Elected in 1984. Resigned. |
| Martin Dies Jr. | Democratic | March 4, 1931 – January 3, 1945 | 2nd | Orange | Elected in 1930. Retired. |
| Martin Dies Jr. | Democratic | January 3, 1953 – January 3, 1959 | At-large | Lufkin | Elected in 1952. Retired. |
| Martin Dies Sr. | Democratic | March 4, 1909 – March 3, 1919 | 2nd | Beaumont | Elected in 1908. Retired. |
| Lloyd Doggett | Democratic | January 3, 1995 – January 3, 2005 | 10th | Austin | Elected in 1994. Redistricted to the 25th district. |
| Lloyd Doggett | Democratic | January 3, 2005 – January 3, 2013 | 25th | Austin | Redistricted from the 10th district and re-elected in 2004. Redistricted to the 35th district. |
| Lloyd Doggett | Democratic | January 3, 2013 – January 3, 2023 | 35th | Austin | Redistricted from the 25th district and re-elected in 2012. Redistricted to the 37th district. |
| Lloyd Doggett | Democratic | January 3, 2023 – present | 37th | Austin | Redistricted from the 35th district and re-elected in 2022. Incumbent. |
| John Dowdy | Democratic | September 23, 1952 – January 3, 1967 | 7th | Athens | Elected to finish Pickett's term. Redistricted to the 2nd district. |
| John Dowdy | Democratic | January 3, 1967 – January 3, 1973 | 2nd | Athens | Redistricted from the 7th district and re-elected in 1966. Retired. |
| Joe H. Eagle | Democratic | March 4, 1913 – March 3, 1921 | 8th | Houston | Elected in 1912. Retired. |
| Joe H. Eagle | Democratic | January 28, 1933 – January 3, 1937 | 8th | Houston | Elected to finish D. Garrett's term. Retired to run for U.S. Senator. |
| Bob Eckhardt | Democratic | January 3, 1967 – January 3, 1981 | 8th | Houston | Elected in 1966. Lost re-election. |
| Chet Edwards | Democratic | January 3, 1991 – January 3, 2005 | 11th | Waco | Elected in 1990. Redistricted to the 17th district. |
| Chet Edwards | Democratic | January 3, 2005 – January 3, 2011 | 17th | Waco | Redistricted from the 11th district and re-elected in 2004. Lost re-election. |
| Jake Ellzey | Republican | July 30, 2021 – present | 6th | Midlothian | Elected to finish R. Wright's term. Incumbent. |
| Veronica Escobar | Democratic | January 3, 2019 – present | 16th | El Paso | Elected in 2018. Incumbent. |
| Lemuel D. Evans | Know; Nothing | March 4, 1855 – March 3, 1857 | 1st | Marshall | Elected in 1855. Lost re-election. |
| Pat Fallon | Republican | January 3, 2021 – present | 4th | Prosper | Elected in 2020. Incumbent. |
| Blake Farenthold | Republican | January 3, 2011 – April 6, 2018 | 27th | Corpus Christi | Elected in 2010. Resigned. |
| Scott Field | Democratic | March 4, 1903 – March 3, 1907 | 6th | Calvert | Elected in 1902. Retired. |
| Jack Fields | Republican | January 3, 1981 – January 3, 1997 | 8th | Humble | Elected in 1980. Retired. |
| O. C. Fisher | Democratic | January 3, 1943 – December 31, 1974 | 21st | San Angelo | Elected in 1942. Resigned. |
| Lizzie Fletcher | Democratic | January 3, 2019 – present | 7th | Houston | Elected in 2018. Incumbent. |
| Bill Flores | Republican | January 3, 2011 – January 3, 2021 | 17th | Bryan | Elected in 2010. Retired. |
| Mayra Flores | Republican | June 21, 2022 – January 3, 2023 | 34th | McAllen | Elected to finish Vela's term. Lost re-election. |
| Ed Foreman | Republican | January 3, 1963 – January 3, 1965 | 16th | Odessa | Elected in 1962. Lost re-election. |
| Martin Frost | Democratic | January 3, 1979 – January 3, 2005 | 24th | Dallas | Elected in 1978. Redistricted to the 32nd district and lost re-election. |
| Pete Gallego | Democratic | January 3, 2013 – January 3, 2015 | 23rd | Alpine | Elected in 2012. Lost re-election. |
| Robert Gammage | Democratic | January 3, 1977 – January 3, 1979 | 22nd | Houston | Elected in 1976. Lost re-election. |
| Sylvia Garcia | Democratic | January 3, 2019 – present | 29th | Houston | Elected in 2018. Incumbent. |
| John Nance Garner | Democratic | March 4, 1903 – March 3, 1933 | 15th | Uvalde | Elected in 1902. Resigned to become Vice President of the United States. |
| Clyde L. Garrett | Democratic | January 3, 1937 – January 3, 1941 | 17th | Eastland | Elected in 1936. Lost renomination. |
| Daniel E. Garrett | Democratic | March 4, 1913 – March 3, 1915 | At-large | Houston | Elected in 1912. Lost renomination. |
| Daniel E. Garrett | Democratic | March 4, 1917 – March 3, 1919 | At-large | Houston | Elected in 1916. Redistricted to the 8th district and retired. |
| Daniel E. Garrett | Democratic | March 4, 1921 – December 13, 1932 | 8th | Houston | Elected in 1920. Died. |
| Brady P. Gentry | Democratic | January 3, 1953 – January 3, 1957 | 3rd | Tyler | Elected in 1952. Retired. |
| Pete Geren | Democratic | September 12, 1989 – January 3, 1997 | 12th | Fort Worth | Elected to finish J. Wright's term. Retired. |
| Dewitt Clinton Giddings | Democratic | May 13, 1872 – March 3, 1875 | 3rd | Brenham | Successfully contested Clark's election. Retired. |
| Dewitt Clinton Giddings | Democratic | March 4, 1877 – March 3, 1879 | 5th | Brenham | Elected in 1876. Retired. |
| Brandon Gill | Republican | January 3, 2025 – present | 26th | Flower Mound | Elected in 2024. Incumbent. |
| Oscar W. Gillespie | Democratic | March 4, 1903 – March 3, 1911 | 12th | Fort Worth | Elected in 1902. Lost renomination. |
| Louie Gohmert | Republican | January 3, 2005 – January 3, 2023 | 1st | Tyler | Elected in 2004. Retired to run for Texas Attorney General. |
| Craig Goldman | Republican | January 3, 2025 – present | 12th | Fort Worth | Elected in 2024. Incumbent. |
| Tony Gonzales | Republican | January 3, 2021 – April 14, 2026 | 23rd | San Antonio | Elected in 2020. Resigned. |
| Charlie Gonzalez | Democratic | January 3, 1999 – January 3, 2013 | 20th | San Antonio | Elected in 1998. Retired. |
| Henry B. González | Democratic | November 4, 1961 – January 3, 1999 | 20th | San Antonio | Elected to finish Kilday's term. Retired. |
| Vicente Gonzalez | Democratic | January 3, 2017 – January 3, 2023 | 15th | McAllen | Elected in 2016. Redistricted to the 34th district. |
| Vicente Gonzalez | Democratic | January 3, 2023 – present | 34th | McAllen | Redistricted from the 15th district and re-elected in 2022. Incumbent. |
| Lance Gooden | Republican | January 3, 2019 – present | 5th | Terrell | Elected in 2018. Incumbent. |
| Ed Gossett | Democratic | January 3, 1939 – July 31, 1951 | 13th | Wichita Falls | Elected in 1938. Resigned. |
| Phil Gramm | Democratic | January 3, 1979 – January 5, 1983 | 6th | College Station | Elected in 1978. Resigned. |
| Phil Gramm | Republican | February 12, 1983 – January 3, 1985 | 6th | College Station | Re-elected to finish his own term. Retired to run for U.S. Senator. |
| Kay Granger | Republican | January 3, 1997 – January 3, 2025 | 12th | Fort Worth | Elected in 1996. Retired. |
| Al Green | Democratic | January 3, 2005 – present | 9th | Houston | Elected in 2004. Incumbent. |
| Gene Green | Democratic | January 3, 1993 – January 3, 2019 | 29th | Houston | Elected in 1992. Retired. |
| Alexander W. Gregg | Democratic | March 4, 1903 – March 3, 1919 | 7th | Palestine | Elected in 1902. Retired. |
| Walter Gresham | Democratic | March 4, 1893 – March 3, 1895 | 10th | Galveston | Elected in 1892. Lost renomination. |
| Ben H. Guill | Republican | May 6, 1950 – January 3, 1951 | 18th | Pampa | Elected to finish Worley's term. Lost re-election. |
| Ralph Hall | Democratic | January 3, 1981 – January 5, 2004 | 4th | Rockwall | Elected in 1980. Changed parties. |
| Ralph Hall | Republican | January 5, 2004 – January 3, 2015 | 4th | Rockwall | Changed parties and re-elected in 2004. Lost renomination. |
| Sam B. Hall Jr. | Democratic | June 19, 1976 – May 27, 1985 | 1st | Marshall | Elected to finish W. Patman's term. Resigned to become U.S. District Court Judge. |
| Andrew Jackson Hamilton | Independent | March 4, 1859 – March 3, 1861 | 2nd | Austin | Elected in 1859. Retired. |
| Kent Hance | Democratic | January 3, 1979 – January 3, 1985 | 19th | Lubbock | Elected in 1978. Retired to run for U.S. Senator. |
| John Hancock | Democratic | March 4, 1871 – March 3, 1875 | 4th | Austin | Elected in 1871. Redistricted to the 5th district. |
| John Hancock | Democratic | March 4, 1875 – March 3, 1877 | 5th | Austin | Redistricted from the 4th district and re-elected in 1874. Retired. |
| John Hancock | Democratic | March 4, 1883 – March 3, 1885 | 10th | Austin | Elected in 1882. Retired. |
| Rufus Hardy | Democratic | March 4, 1907 – March 3, 1923 | 6th | Corsicana | Elected in 1906. Retired. |
| Silas Hare | Democratic | March 4, 1887 – March 3, 1891 | 5th | Sherman | Elected in 1886. Lost renomination. |
| Robert B. Hawley | Republican | March 4, 1897 – March 3, 1901 | 10th | Galveston | Elected in 1896. Retired. |
| Robert Lee Henry | Democratic | March 4, 1897 – March 3, 1903 | 7th | Waco | Elected in 1896. Redistricted to the 11th district. |
| Robert Lee Henry | Democratic | March 4, 1903 – March 3, 1917 | 11th | Waco | Redistricted from the 7th district and re-elected in 1902. Retired to run for U.S. Senator. |
| Jeb Hensarling | Republican | January 3, 2003 – January 3, 2019 | 5th | Dallas | Elected in 2002. Retired. |
| William S. Herndon | Democratic | March 4, 1871 – March 3, 1875 | 1st | Tyler | Elected in 1871. Lost renomination. |
| Jack Hightower | Democratic | January 3, 1975 – January 3, 1985 | 13th | Vernon | Elected in 1974. Lost re-election. |
| Rubén Hinojosa | Democratic | January 3, 1997 – January 3, 2017 | 15th | Mercedes | Elected in 1996. Retired. |
| Volney Howard | Democratic | March 4, 1849 – March 3, 1853 | 2nd | San Antonio | Elected in 1849. Lost re-election. |
| Claude Benton Hudspeth | Democratic | March 4, 1919 – March 3, 1931 | 16th | El Paso | Elected in 1918. Retired. |
| Wesley Hunt | Republican | January 3, 2023 – present | 38th | Houston | Elected in 2022. Incumbent. |
| Will Hurd | Republican | January 3, 2015 – January 3, 2021 | 23rd | Helotes | Elected in 2014. Retired. |
| Joseph Chappell Hutcheson | Democratic | March 4, 1893 – March 3, 1897 | 1st | Houston | Elected in 1892. Retired. |
| Frank N. Ikard | Democratic | September 8, 1951 – December 15, 1961 | 13th | Wichita Falls | Elected to finish Gossett's term. Resigned. |
| Ronny Jackson | Republican | January 3, 2021 – present | 13th | Amarillo | Elected in 2020. Incumbent. |
| Sheila Jackson Lee | Democratic | January 3, 1995 – July 19, 2024 | 18th | Houston | Elected in 1994. Died. |
| Eddie Bernice Johnson | Democratic | January 3, 1993 – January 3, 2023 | 30th | Dallas | Elected in 1992. Retired. |
| Julie Johnson | Democratic | January 3, 2025 – present | 32nd | Farmers Branch | Elected in 2024. Incumbent. |
| Luther Alexander Johnson | Democratic | March 4, 1923 – July 17, 1946 | 6th | Corsicana | Elected in 1922. Resigned to become U.S. Tax Court Judge. |
| Lyndon B. Johnson | Democratic | April 10, 1937 – January 3, 1949 | 10th | Johnson City | Elected to finish Buchanan's term. Retired to run for U.S. Senator. |
| Sam Johnson | Republican | May 8, 1991 – January 3, 2019 | 3rd | Plano | Elected to finish Bartlett's term. Retired. |
| George Washington Jones | Greenback | March 4, 1879 – March 3, 1883 | 5th | Bastrop | Elected in 1878. Retired. |
| James H. Jones | Democratic | March 4, 1883 – March 3, 1887 | 3rd | Henderson | Elected in 1882. Retired. |
| John Marvin Jones | Democratic | March 4, 1917 – March 3, 1919 | 13th | Amarillo | Elected in 1916. Redistricted to the 18th district. |
| John Marvin Jones | Democratic | March 4, 1919 – November 20, 1940 | 18th | Amarillo | Elected in 1918. Resigned to join the U.S. Court of Claims. |
| Barbara Jordan | Democratic | January 3, 1973 – January 3, 1979 | 18th | Houston | Elected in 1972. Retired. |
| David S. Kaufman | Democratic | March 30, 1846 – January 31, 1851 | 1st | Nacogdoches | Elected in 1846. Died. |
| Abraham Kazen | Democratic | January 3, 1967 – January 3, 1985 | 23rd | Laredo | Elected in 1966. Lost renomination. |
| Paul J. Kilday | Democratic | January 3, 1939 – September 24, 1961 | 20th | San Antonio | Elected in 1938. Resigned to join the U.S. Court of Appeals for the Armed Forces. |
| Constantine B. Kilgore | Democratic | March 4, 1887 – March 3, 1895 | 3rd | Wills Point | Elected in 1886. Retired. |
| Joe M. Kilgore | Democratic | January 3, 1955 – January 3, 1965 | 15th | McAllen | Elected in 1954. Retired. |
| Richard M. Kleberg | Democratic | November 24, 1931 – January 3, 1945 | 14th | Corpus Christi | Elected to finish Wurzbach's term. Lost renomination. |
| Rudolph Kleberg | Democratic | April 7, 1896 – March 3, 1903 | 11th | Cuero | Elected to finish Crain's term. Retired. |
| Bob Krueger | Democratic | January 3, 1975 – January 3, 1979 | 21st | New Braunfels | Elected in 1974. Retired to run for U.S. Senator. |
| Nick Lampson | Democratic | January 3, 1997 – January 3, 2005 | 9th | Beaumont | Elected in 1996. Redistricted to the 2nd district and lost re-election. |
| Nick Lampson | Democratic | January 3, 2007 – January 3, 2009 | 22nd | Stafford | Elected in 2006. Lost re-election. |
| Fritz G. Lanham | Democratic | April 19, 1919 – January 3, 1947 | 12th | Fort Worth | Elected to finish James Wilson's term. Retired. |
| S. W. T. Lanham | Democratic | March 4, 1883 – March 3, 1893 | 11th | Weatherford | Elected in 1882. Retired. |
| S. W. T. Lanham | Democratic | March 4, 1897 – January 15, 1903 | 8th | Weatherford | Elected in 1896. Resigned to when elected Governor of Texas. |
| Greg Laughlin | Democratic | January 3, 1989 – June 26, 1995 | 14th | West Columbia | Elected in 1988. Changed parties. |
| Greg Laughlin | Republican | June 26, 1995 – January 3, 1997 | 14th | West Columbia | Changed parties. Lost renomination. |
| Marvin Leath | Democratic | January 3, 1979 – January 3, 1991 | 11th | Waco | Elected in 1978. Retired. |
| Robert Quincy Lee | Democratic | March 4, 1929 – April 18, 1930 | 17th | Cisco | Elected in 1928. Died. |
| Erica Lee Carter | Democratic | November 5, 2024 – January 3, 2025 | 18th | Houston | Elected to finish the term of her mother, Sheila Jackson Lee. Retired. |
| Mickey Leland | Democratic | January 3, 1979 – August 7, 1989 | 18th | Houston | Elected in 1978. Died. |
| Robert M. Lively | Democratic | July 23, 1910 – March 3, 1911 | 3rd | Canton | Elected to finish G. Russell's term. Retired. |
| Tom Loeffler | Republican | January 3, 1979 – January 3, 1987 | 21st | Hunt | Elected in 1978. Retired to run for Governor of Texas. |
| John B. Long | Democratic | March 4, 1891 – March 3, 1893 | 2nd | Rusk | Elected in 1890. Lost renomination. |
| Wingate H. Lucas | Democratic | January 3, 1947 – January 3, 1955 | 12th | Grapevine | Elected in 1946. Lost renomination. |
| Morgan Luttrell | Republican | January 3, 2023 – present | 8th | Magnolia | Elected in 2022. Incumbent. |
| John E. Lyle Jr. | Democratic | January 3, 1945 – January 3, 1955 | 14th | Corpus Christi | Elected in 1944. Retired. |
| George H. Mahon | Democratic | January 3, 1935 – January 3, 1979 | 19th | Colorado City | Elected in 1934. Retired. |
| Joseph J. Mansfield | Democratic | March 4, 1917 – July 12, 1947 | 9th | Columbus | Elected in 1916. Died. |
| Kenny Marchant | Republican | January 3, 2005 – January 3, 2021 | 24th | Carrollton | Elected in 2004. Retired. |
| William Harrison Martin | Democratic | November 4, 1887 – March 3, 1891 | 2nd | Athens | Elected to finish Reagan's term. Retired. |
| Jim Mattox | Democratic | January 3, 1977 – January 3, 1983 | 5th | Dallas | Elected in 1976. Retired to run for Texas Attorney General. |
| Maury Maverick | Democratic | January 3, 1935 – January 3, 1939 | 20th | San Antonio | Elected in 1934. Lost renomination. |
| Michael McCaul | Republican | January 3, 2005 – present | 10th | Austin | Elected in 2004. Incumbent. |
| Augustus McCloskey | Democratic | March 4, 1929 – February 10, 1930 | 14th | San Antonio | Elected in 1928. Lost election contest. |
| William D. McFarlane | Democratic | March 4, 1933 – January 3, 1939 | 13th | Graham | Elected in 1932. Lost renomination. |
| William P. McLean | Democratic | March 4, 1873 – March 3, 1875 | 2nd | Mount Pleasant | Elected in 1872. Retired. |
| A. Jeff McLemore | Democratic | March 4, 1915 – March 3, 1919 | At-large | Houston | Elected in 1914. Redistrict to the 8th district and lost renomination. |
| Christian Menefee | Democratic | January 31, 2026 – present | 18th | Houston | Elected to finish Sylvester Turner's term. Incumbent. |
| Dale Milford | Democratic | January 3, 1973 – January 3, 1979 | 24th | Grand Prairie | Elected in 1972. Lost renomination. |
| James Francis Miller | Democratic | March 4, 1883 – March 3, 1887 | 8th | Gonzales | Elected in 1882. Retired. |
| Roger Q. Mills | Democratic | March 4, 1873 – March 3, 1875 | At-large | Corsicana | Elected in 1872. Redistricted to the 4th district. |
| Roger Q. Mills | Democratic | March 4, 1875 – March 3, 1883 | 4th | Corsicana | Redistricted from the at-large seat and re-elected in 1874. Redistricted to the 9th district. |
| Roger Q. Mills | Democratic | March 4, 1883 – March 23, 1892 | 9th | Corsicana | Redistricted from the 4th district and re-elected in 1882. Resigned when elected U.S. Senator. |
| John M. Moore | Democratic | June 6, 1905 – March 3, 1913 | 8th | Richmond | Elected to finish Pinckney's term. Retired. |
| Littleton W. Moore | Democratic | March 4, 1887 – March 3, 1893 | 8th | La Grange | Elected in 1886. Retired. |
| Nathaniel Moran | Republican | January 3, 2023 – present | 1st | Tyler | Elected in 2022. Incumbent. |
| Troy Nehls | Republican | January 3, 2021 – present | 22nd | Richmond | Elected in 2020. Incumbent. |
| Randy Neugebauer | Republican | June 3, 2003 – January 3, 2017 | 19th | Lubbock | Elected to finish Combest's term. Retired. |
| George H. Noonan | Republican | March 4, 1895 – March 3, 1897 | 12th | San Antonio | Elected in 1894. Lost re-election. |
| Beto O'Rourke | Democratic | January 3, 2013 – January 3, 2019 | 16th | El Paso | Elected in 2012. Retired to run for U.S. Senator. |
| Thomas P. Ochiltree | Independent | March 4, 1883 – March 3, 1885 | 7th | Galveston | Elected in 1882. Retired. |
| Pete Olson | Republican | January 3, 2009 – January 3, 2021 | 22nd | Sugar Land | Elected in 2008. Retired. |
| Solomon Ortiz | Democratic | January 3, 1983 – January 3, 2011 | 27th | Corpus Christi | Elected in 1982. Lost re-election. |
| Lucian W. Parrish | Democratic | March 4, 1919 – March 27, 1922 | 13th | Henrietta | Elected in 1918. Died. |
| Thomas M. Paschal | Democratic | March 4, 1893 – March 3, 1895 | 12th | Castroville | Elected in 1892. Lost renomination. |
| Bill Patman | Democratic | January 3, 1981 – January 3, 1985 | 14th | Ganado | Elected in 1980. Lost re-election. |
| Wright Patman | Democratic | March 4, 1929 – March 7, 1976 | 1st | Texarkana | Elected in 1928. Died. |
| Nat Patton | Democratic | January 3, 1935 – January 3, 1945 | 7th | Crockett | Elected in 1934. Lost renomination. |
| Ron Paul | Republican | April 3, 1976 – January 3, 1977 | 22nd | Lake Jackson | Elected to finish Casey's term. Lost re-election. |
| Ron Paul | Republican | January 3, 1979 – January 3, 1985 | 22nd | Lake Jackson | Elected in 1978. Retired to run for U.S. Senator. |
| Ron Paul | Republican | January 3, 1997 – January 3, 2013 | 14th | Lake Jackson | Elected in 1996. Retired to run for President of the United States. |
| George C. Pendleton | Democratic | March 4, 1893 – March 3, 1897 | 7th | Belton | Elected in 1892. Retired. |
| August Pfluger | Republican | January 3, 2021 – present | 11th | San Angelo | Elected in 2020. Incumbent. |
| Tom Pickett | Democratic | January 3, 1945 – June 30, 1952 | 7th | Palestine | Elected in 1944. Resigned to become Vice President of the National Coal Association. |
| J. J. Pickle | Democratic | December 21, 1963 – January 3, 1995 | 10th | Austin | Elected to finish H. Thornberry's term. Retired. |
| Timothy Pilsbury | Democratic | March 30, 1846 – March 3, 1849 | 2nd | Brazoria | Elected in 1846. Lost re-election. |
| John M. Pinckney | Democratic | November 17, 1903 – April 24, 1905 | 8th | Hempstead | Elected to finish Ball's term. Assassinated. |
| William R. Poage | Democratic | January 3, 1937 – December 31, 1978 | 11th | Waco | Elected in 1936. Resigned. |
| Ted Poe | Republican | January 3, 2005 – January 3, 2019 | 2nd | Humble | Elected in 2004. Retired. |
| Joe R. Pool | Democratic | January 3, 1963 – January 3, 1967 | At-large | Dallas | Elected in 1962. Redistricted to the 3rd district. |
| Joe R. Pool | Democratic | January 3, 1967 – July 14, 1968 | 3rd | Dallas | Redistricted from the at-large seat and re-elected in 1966. Died. |
| Bob Price | Republican | January 3, 1967 – January 3, 1973 | 18th | Pampa | Elected in 1966. Redistricted to the 13th district. |
| Bob Price | Republican | January 3, 1973 – January 3, 1975 | 13th | Pampa | Redistricted from the 18th district and re-elected in 1972. Lost re-election. |
| Graham B. Purcell Jr. | Democratic | January 27, 1962 – January 3, 1973 | 13th | Wichita Falls | Elected to finish Ikard's term. Lost re-election. |
| Choice B. Randell | Democratic | March 4, 1901 – March 3, 1903 | 5th | Sherman | Elected in 1900. Redistricted to the 4th district. |
| Choice B. Randell | Democratic | March 4, 1903 – March 3, 1913 | 4th | Sherman | Redistricted from the 5th district and re-elected in 1902. Retired to run for U.S. Senator. |
| John Ratcliffe | Republican | January 3, 2015 – May 22, 2020 | 4th | Heath | Elected in 2014. Resigned to become Director of National Intelligence. |
| Sam Rayburn | Democratic | March 4, 1913 – November 16, 1961 | 4th | Bonham | Elected in 1912. Died. |
| John Henninger Reagan | Democratic | March 4, 1857 – January 15, 1861 | 1st | Palestine | Elected in 1857. Resigned. |
| John Henninger Reagan | Democratic | March 4, 1875 – March 3, 1883 | 1st | Palestine | Elected in 1874. Redistricted to the 2nd district. |
| John Henninger Reagan | Democratic | March 4, 1883 – March 3, 1887 | 2nd | Palestine | Redistricted from the 1st district and re-elected in 1882. Resigned when elected to U.S. Senator. |
| Kenneth M. Regan | Democratic | August 23, 1947 – January 3, 1955 | 16th | Midland | Elected to finish Thomason's term. Lost renomination. |
| Silvestre Reyes | Democratic | January 3, 1997 – January 3, 2013 | 16th | El Paso | Elected in 1996. Lost renomination. |
| Ray Roberts | Democratic | January 30, 1962 – January 3, 1981 | 4th | McKinney | Elected to finish Rayburn's term. Retired. |
| Ciro Rodriguez | Democratic | April 12, 1997 – January 3, 2005 | 28th | San Antonio | Elected to finish Tejada's term. Lost renomination. |
| Ciro Rodriguez | Democratic | January 3, 2007 – January 3, 2011 | 23rd | San Antonio | Elected in 2006. Lost re-election. |
| Walter E. Rogers | Democratic | January 3, 1951 – January 3, 1967 | 18th | Pampa | Elected in 1950. Retired. |
| Chip Roy | Republican | January 3, 2019 – present | 21st | Austin | Elected in 2018. Incumbent. |
| Gordon J. Russell | Democratic | November 4, 1902 – June 14, 1910 | 3rd | Tyler | Elected to finish De Graffenreid's term. Resigned to become U.S. District Court Judge. |
| Sam M. Russell | Democratic | January 3, 1941 – January 3, 1947 | 17th | Stephenville | Elected in 1940. Retired. |
| J. T. Rutherford | Democratic | January 3, 1955 – January 3, 1963 | 16th | Odessa | Elected in 1954. Lost re-election. |
| Morgan G. Sanders | Democratic | March 4, 1921 – January 3, 1939 | 3rd | Canton | Elected in 1920. Retired. |
| Max Sandlin | Democratic | January 3, 1997 – January 3, 2005 | 1st | Marshall | Elected in 1996. Lost re-election. |
| Bill Sarpalius | Democratic | January 3, 1989 – January 3, 1995 | 13th | Amarillo | Elected in 1988. Lost re-election. |
| Joseph D. Sayers | Democratic | March 4, 1885 – March 3, 1893 | 10th | Bastrop | Elected in 1884. Redistricted to the 9th district. |
| Joseph D. Sayers | Democratic | March 4, 1893 – January 16, 1899 | 9th | Bastrop | Redistricted from the 10th district and re-elected in 1892. Resigned when elected Governor of Texas. |
| Gustav Schleicher | Democratic | March 4, 1875 – January 10, 1879 | 6th | Cuero | Elected in 1874. Died. |
| Richardson A. Scurry | Democratic | March 4, 1851 – March 3, 1853 | 1st | Clarksville | Elected in 1851. Retired. |
| Shelley Sekula-Gibbs | Republican | November 13, 2006 – January 3, 2007 | 22nd | Houston | Elected to finish DeLay's term. Lost re-election. |
| Keith Self | Republican | January 3, 2023 – present | 3rd | Frisco | Elected in 2022. Incumbent. |
| Pete Sessions | Republican | January 3, 1997 – January 3, 2003 | 5th | Dallas | Elected in 1996. Redistricted to the 32nd district. |
| Pete Sessions | Republican | January 3, 2003 – January 3, 2019 | 32nd | Dallas | Redistricted from the 5th district and re-elected in 2002. Lost re-election. |
| Pete Sessions | Republican | January 3, 2021 – present | 17th | Waco | Elected in 2020. Incumbent. |
| John Levi Sheppard | Democratic | March 4, 1899 – October 11, 1902 | 4th | Texarkana | Elected in 1898. Died. |
| Morris Sheppard | Democratic | November 15, 1902 – March 3, 1903 | 4th | Texarkana | Elected to finish J. Sheppard's term. Redistricted to the 1st district. |
| Morris Sheppard | Democratic | March 4, 1903 – March 3, 1913 | 1st | Texarkana | Redistricted from the 4th district and re-elected in 1902. Retired to run for U.S. Senator. |
| James Luther Slayden | Democratic | March 4, 1897 – March 3, 1903 | 12th | San Antonio | Elected in 1896. Redistricted to the 14th district. |
| James Luther Slayden | Democratic | March 4, 1903 – March 3, 1919 | 14th | San Antonio | Redistricted from the 12th district and re-elected in 1902. Retired. |
| Lamar Smith | Republican | January 3, 1987 – January 3, 2019 | 21st | San Antonio | Elected in 1986. Retired. |
| William Robert Smith | Democratic | March 4, 1903 – March 3, 1917 | 16th | Colorado City | Elected in 1902. Lost renomination. |
| George W. Smyth | Democratic | March 4, 1853 – March 3, 1855 | 1st | Jasper | Elected in 1853. Retired. |
| Charles L. South | Democratic | January 3, 1935 – January 3, 1943 | 21st | Coleman | Elected in 1934. Lost renomination. |
| Alan Steelman | Republican | January 3, 1973 – January 3, 1977 | 5th | Dallas | Elected in 1972. Retired to run for U.S. Senator. |
| Charles Stenholm | Democratic | January 3, 1979 – January 3, 2005 | 17th | Stamford | Elected in 1978. Redistricted to the 19th district and lost re-election. |
| John Hall Stephens | Democratic | March 4, 1897 – March 3, 1917 | 13th | Vernon | Elected in 1896. Lost renomination. |
| Charles Stewart | Democratic | March 4, 1883 – March 3, 1893 | 1st | Houston | Elected in 1882. Retired. |
| Steve Stockman | Republican | January 3, 1995 – January 3, 1997 | 9th | Beaumont | Elected in 1994. Lost re-election. |
| Steve Stockman | Republican | January 3, 2013 – January 3, 2015 | 36th | Beaumont | Elected in 2012. Retired to run for U.S. Senator. |
| Sterling P. Strong | Democratic | March 4, 1933 – January 3, 1935 | At-large | Dallas | Elected in 1932. Redistricted to the 20th district and lost renomination. |
| Hatton W. Sumners | Democratic | March 4, 1913 – March 3, 1915 | At-large | Dallas | Elected in 1912. Redistricted to the 5th district. |
| Hatton W. Sumners | Democratic | March 4, 1915 – January 3, 1947 | 5th | Dallas | Redistricted from the at-large seat and re-elected in 1914. Retired. |
| Mac Sweeney | Republican | January 3, 1985 – January 3, 1989 | 14th | Wharton | Elected in 1984. Lost re-election. |
| Van Taylor | Republican | January 3, 2019 – January 3, 2023 | 3rd | Plano | Elected in 2018. Retired. |
| Olin E. Teague | Democratic | August 24, 1946 – December 31, 1978 | 6th | College Station | Elected to finish Luther Johnson's term. Resigned. |
| Frank Tejeda | Democratic | January 3, 1993 – January 30, 1997 | 28th | San Antonio | Elected in 1992. Died. |
| George B. Terrell | Democratic | March 4, 1933 – January 3, 1935 | At-large | Alto | Elected in 1932. Redistricted to the 21st district and retired. |
| Albert Thomas | Democratic | January 3, 1937 – February 15, 1966 | 8th | Houston | Elected in 1936. Died. |
| Lera Millard Thomas | Democratic | March 26, 1966 – January 3, 1967 | 8th | Houston | Elected to finish her husband's term. Retired. |
| R. Ewing Thomason | Democratic | March 4, 1931 – July 31, 1947 | 16th | El Paso | Elected in 1930. Resigned to become U.S. District Court Judge. |
| Clark W. Thompson | Democratic | June 24, 1933 – January 3, 1935 | 7th | Galveston | Elected to finish Briggs's term. Retired. |
| Clark W. Thompson | Democratic | August 23, 1947 – December 30, 1966 | 9th | Galveston | Elected to finish Mansfield's term. Resigned. |
| Homer Thornberry | Democratic | January 3, 1949 – December 20, 1963 | 10th | Austin | Elected in 1948. Resigned to become U.S. District Court Judge. |
| Mac Thornberry | Republican | January 3, 1995 – January 3, 2021 | 13th | Clarendon | Elected in 1994. Retired. |
| James W. Throckmorton | Democratic | March 4, 1875 – March 3, 1879 | 3rd | McKinney | Elected in 1874. Retired. |
| James W. Throckmorton | Democratic | March 4, 1883 – March 3, 1887 | 5th | McKinney | Elected in 1882. Retired. |
| Jim Turner | Democratic | January 3, 1997 – January 3, 2005 | 2nd | Crockett | Elected in 1996. Redistricted to the 8th district and retired. |
| Sylvester Turner | Democratic | January 3, 2025 – March 5, 2025 | 18th | Houston | Elected in 2024. Died. |
| Christopher C. Upson | Democratic | April 15, 1879 – March 3, 1883 | 6th | San Antonio | Elected to finish Schleicher's term. Lost renomination. |
| Beth Van Duyne | Republican | January 3, 2021 – present | 24th | Irving | Elected in 2020. Incumbent. |
| Tom Vandergriff | Democratic | January 3, 1983 – January 3, 1985 | 26th | Arlington | Elected in 1982. Lost re-election. |
| Horace Worth Vaughan | Democratic | March 4, 1913 – March 3, 1915 | 1st | Texarkana | Elected in 1912. Retired. |
| Marc Veasey | Democratic | January 3, 2013 – present | 33rd | Fort Worth | Elected in 2012. Incumbent. |
| Filemon Vela Jr. | Democratic | January 3, 2013 – March 31, 2022 | 34th | Brownsville | Elected in 2012. Resigned. |
| Craig Washington | Democratic | December 9, 1989 – January 3, 1995 | 18th | Houston | Elected to finish Leland's term. Lost renomination. |
| Randy Weber | Republican | January 3, 2013 – present | 14th | Pearland | Elected in 2012. Incumbent. |
| Olin Wellborn | Democratic | March 4, 1879 – March 3, 1883 | 3rd | Dallas | Elected in 1878. Redistricted to the 6th district. |
| Olin Wellborn | Democratic | March 4, 1883 – March 3, 1887 | 6th | Dallas | Redistricted from the 3rd district and re-elected in 1882. Lost renomination. |
| Milton H. West | Democratic | April 23, 1933 – October 28, 1948 | 15th | Brownsville | Elected to finish Garner's term. Died. |
| Richard Crawford White | Democratic | January 3, 1965 – January 3, 1983 | 16th | El Paso | Elected in 1964. Retired. |
| George W. Whitmore | Republican | March 30, 1870 – March 3, 1871 | 1st | Tyler | Elected to the vacant term. Lost re-election. |
| Guinn Williams | Democratic | May 22, 1922 – March 3, 1933 | 13th | Decatur | Elected to finish Parrish's term. Retired. |
| Roger Williams | Republican | January 3, 2013 – present | 25th | Weatherford | Elected in 2012. Incumbent. |
| Asa H. Willie | Democratic | March 4, 1873 – March 3, 1875 | At-large | Galveston | Elected in 1872. Retired. |
| Charlie Wilson | Democratic | January 3, 1973 – January 3, 1997 | 2nd | Lufkin | Elected in 1972. Retired. |
| James Clifton Wilson | Democratic | March 4, 1917 – March 3, 1919 | 12th | Fort Worth | Elected in 1916. Resigned to become U.S. District Court Judge. |
| Joseph Franklin Wilson | Democratic | January 3, 1947 – January 3, 1955 | 5th | Dallas | Elected in 1946. Retired. |
| Dudley G. Wooten | Democratic | July 13, 1901 – March 3, 1903 | 6th | Dallas | Elected to finish Burke's term. Lost renomination. |
| Eugene Worley | Democratic | January 3, 1941 – April 3, 1950 | 18th | Shamrock | Elected in 1940. Resigned to join the U.S. Court of Customs and Patent Appeals. |
| Jim Wright | Democratic | January 3, 1955 – June 30, 1989 | 12th | Weatherford | Elected in 1954. Resigned. |
| Ron Wright | Republican | January 3, 2019 – February 7, 2021 | 6th | Arlington | Elected in 2018. Died. |
| Harry M. Wurzbach | Republican | March 4, 1921 – March 3, 1929 | 14th | Seguin | Elected in 1920. Lost re-election. |
| Harry M. Wurzbach | Republican | February 10, 1930 – November 6, 1931 | 14th | Seguin | Successfully contested McCloskey's election. Died. |
| Joseph P. Wyatt Jr. | Democratic | January 3, 1979 – January 3, 1981 | 14th | Bloomington | Elected in 1978. Retired. |
| Charles Henderson Yoakum | Democratic | March 4, 1895 – March 3, 1897 | 3rd | Yoakum | Elected in 1894. Retired. |
| James Young | Democratic | March 4, 1911 – March 3, 1921 | 3rd | Kaufman | Elected in 1910. Retired. |
| John Andrew Young | Democratic | January 3, 1957 – January 3, 1979 | 14th | Corpus Christi | Elected in 1956. Lost renomination. |

== See also ==
- List of United States senators from Texas
- Texas's congressional delegations
- Texas's congressional districts
