= Texas's 10th congressional district =

U.S. House district for Texas

Coordinates: 29°58′31″N 96°35′41″W

- Interactive map of district boundaries
- Representative: Michael McCaul; R–Austin
- Distribution: 77.46% urban; 22.54% rural
- Population (2025): 840,258
- Median household income: $89,851
- Ethnicity: 56.0% White; 24.9% Hispanic; 9.3% Black; 5.4% Asian; 3.6% Two or more races; 0.7% other
- Cook PVI: R+10

Texas's 10th congressional district of the United States House of Representatives stretches from the northwestern portion of the Greater Houston region to the Greater Austin region. It includes Houston suburbs such as Katy, Cypress, Tomball, and Prairie View, cities in east-central Texas including Brenham and Columbus, and northern Austin and some suburbs including Pflugerville, Bastrop, Manor, and Elgin. The current representative is Michael McCaul.

For most of the time from 1903 to 2005, the 10th was centered on Austin. It originally included large portions of the Texas Hill Country. Future President Lyndon B. Johnson represented this district from 1937 to 1949. During the second half of the 20th century, Austin's dramatic growth resulted in the district becoming more compact over the years. By the 1990s, it was reduced to little more than Austin itself and surrounding suburbs in Travis County.

However, in a mid-decade redistricting conducted in 2003, the 10th was dramatically altered. It lost much of the southern portion of its territory. To make up for the loss in population, it was extended all the way to the outer fringes of Houston, making the new district heavily Republican. Five-term Democratic incumbent Lloyd Doggett was forced to transfer to another district. McCaul won the open seat in 2004, and has held it ever since.

Redistricting after the 2020 census made the district even more Republican, cutting out much of its territory closer to Houston while adding College Station, home to Texas A&M University.

== Recent election results from statewide races ==
=== 2023–2027 boundaries ===
Year	Office	Results
2008	President	McCain 62% - 37%
2012	President	Romney 67% - 33%
2014	Senate	Cornyn 73% - 27%
2014	Governor	Abbott 69% - 31%
2016	President	Trump 60% - 34%
2018	Senate	Cruz 58% - 41%
2018	Governor	Abbott 63% - 35%
2018	Lt. Governor	Patrick 58% - 39%
2018	Attorney General	Paxton 58% - 39%
2018	Comptroller of Public Accounts	Hegar 62% - 35%
2020	President	Trump 59% - 40%
2020	Senate	Cornyn 60% - 37%
2022	Governor	Abbott 61% - 37%
2022	Lt. Governor	Patrick 60% - 37%
2022	Attorney General	Paxton 60% - 37%
2022	Comptroller of Public Accounts	Hegar 64% - 34%
2024	President	Trump 62% - 37%
2024	Senate	Cruz 59% - 38%

=== 2027–2033 boundaries ===
Year	Office	Results
2008	President	McCain 60% - 39%
2012	President	Romney 65% - 35%
2014	Senate	Cornyn 69% - 31%
2014	Governor	Abbott 65% - 35%
2016	President	Trump 58% - 37%
2018	Senate	Cruz 56% - 43%
2018	Governor	Abbott 61% - 37%
2018	Lt. Governor	Patrick 56% - 41%
2018	Attorney General	Paxton 56% - 42%
2018	Comptroller of Public Accounts	Hegar 59% - 37%
2020	President	Trump 56% - 42%
2020	Senate	Cornyn 59% - 39%
2022	Governor	Abbott 59% - 39%
2022	Lt. Governor	Patrick 58% - 40%
2022	Attorney General	Paxton 57% - 40%
2022	Comptroller of Public Accounts	Hegar 62% - 36%
2024	President	Trump 60% - 38%
2024	Senate	Cruz 58% - 39%
2026	Senate	Paxton 49% - 48%
2026	Governor	Abbott 53% - 46%

== Composition ==
For the 118th and successive Congresses (based on redistricting following the 2020 census), the district contains all or portions of the following counties and communities:

Austin County (8)

All 8 communities

Bastrop County (7)

Bastrop (part; also 27th), Camp Swift, Circle D-KC Estates, Elgin (shared with Travis County), McDade, Paige, Smithville (part; also 27th)

Brazos County (6)

All 6 communities

Burleson County (9)

All 9 communities

Colorado County (8)

All 8 communities

Fayette County (8)

All 8 communities

Grimes County (9)

All 9 communities

Lee County (3)

All 3 communities

Madison County (2)

Madisonville, Midway

Travis County (18)

Austin (part; also 21st, 35th, and 37th; shared with Hays and Williamson counties), Bee Cave, Briarcliff, Brushy Creek (part; also 31st and 37th), Cedar Park (part; also 31st; shared with Williamson County), Elgin (shared with Bastrop County), The Hills, Hudson Bend, Jonestown, Lago Vista, Lakeway, Leander (part; also 21st; shared with Williamson County), Manor (part; also 35th), Pflugerville (part; also 17th, 35th, and 37th; shared with Williamson County), Point Venture, Steiner Ranch, Volente, Webberville (part; also 35th), Wells Branch (part; also 37th)

Waller County (7)

All 7 communities

Washington County (2)

Brenham, Burton

Williamson County (4)

Austin (part; also 35th and 37th; shared with Hays and Travis counties), Brushy Creek (part; also 37th), Cedar Park (part; also 31st; shared with Travis County), Round Rock (part; also 17th and 31st; shared with Travis County)

== Future composition ==
Beginning with the 2026 election, the 10th district will consist of the following counties:

- Bastrop (part)
- Brazos
- Burleson
- Grimes
- Houston
- Lee
- Leon
- Madison
- Polk
- San Jacinto
- Travis (part)
- Trinity
- Walker (part)

== List of members representing the district ==
Members	Party	Term	Cong ress	Electoral history	District location
District established March 4, 1883
John Hancock (Austin)	Democratic	March 4, 1883 – March 3, 1885	48th	Elected in 1882; Retired.	Bandera, Bastrop, Bexar, Blanco, Burnet, Coleman, Comal, Concho, Crockett, Edwards, Gillespie, Kendall, Kerr, Kimble, Kinney, Lampasas, Llano, Mason, Medina, Menard, McCulloch, Runnels, San Saba, Travis, Uvalde, and Williamson Counties.
Joseph D. Sayers (Bastrop)	Democratic	March 4, 1885 – March 3, 1893	49th 50th 51st 52nd	Elected in 1884; Re-elected in 1886. Re-elected in 1888. Re-elected in 1890. Redistricted to the 9th district.	Texas Hill Country
Walter Gresham (Galveston)	Democratic	March 4, 1893 – March 3, 1895	53rd	Elected in 1892. Lost renomination.	Texas Hill Country
Miles Crowley (Galveston)	Democratic	March 4, 1895 – March 3, 1897	54th	Elected in 1894. Retired.	Texas Hill Country
Robert B. Hawley (Galveston)	Republican	March 4, 1897 – March 3, 1901	55th 56th	Elected in 1896. Re-elected in 1898. Retired.	Texas Hill Country
George F. Burgess (Gonzales)	Democratic	March 4, 1901 – March 3, 1903	57th	Elected in 1900. Redistricted to the 9th district.	Texas Hill Country
Albert S. Burleson (Austin)	Democratic	March 4, 1903 – March 6, 1913	58th 59th 60th 61st 62nd 63rd	Redistricted from the 9th district and re-elected in 1902. Re-elected in 1904. Re-elected in 1906. Re-elected in 1908. Re-elected in 1910. Re-elected in 1912. Resigned to become U.S. Postmaster General.	Texas Hill Country
Vacant		March 6, 1913 – April 15, 1913	63rd		Texas Hill Country
James P. Buchanan (Brenham)	Democratic	April 15, 1913 – February 22, 1937	63rd 64th 65th 66th 67th 68th 69th 70th 71st 72nd 73rd 74th 75th	Elected to finish Burleson's term. Re-elected in 1914. Re-elected in 1916. Re-elected in 1918. Re-elected in 1920. Re-elected in 1922. Re-elected in 1924. Re-elected in 1926. Re-elected in 1928. Re-elected in 1930. Re-elected in 1932. Re-elected in 1934. Re-elected in 1936; Died.	Texas Hill Country
Vacant		February 22, 1937 – April 10, 1937	75th		Texas Hill Country
Lyndon B. Johnson (Johnson City)	Democratic	April 10, 1937 – January 3, 1949	75th 76th 77th 78th 79th 80th	Elected to finish Buchanan's term. Re-elected in 1938. Re-elected in 1940. Re-elected in 1942. Re-elected in 1944. Re-elected in 1946. Retired to run for U.S. Senator.	Texas Hill Country
Homer Thornberry (Austin)	Democratic	January 3, 1949 – December 20, 1963	81st 82nd 83rd 84th 85th 86th 87th 88th	Elected in 1948. Re-elected in 1950. Re-elected in 1952. Re-elected in 1954. Re-elected in 1956. Re-elected in 1958. Re-elected in 1960. Re-elected in 1962. Resigned to become judge of the U.S. District Court for the Western District of Texas.	Texas Hill Country
Vacant		December 20, 1963 – December 21, 1963	88th		Texas Hill Country
J. J. Pickle (Austin)	Democratic	December 21, 1963 – January 3, 1995	88th 89th 90th 91st 92nd 93rd 94th 95th 96th 97th 98th 99th 100th 101st 102nd 103rd	Elected to finish Thornberry's term. Re-elected in 1964. Re-elected in 1966. Re-elected in 1968. Re-elected in 1970. Re-elected in 1972. Re-elected in 1974. Re-elected in 1976. Re-elected in 1978. Re-elected in 1980. Re-elected in 1982. Re-elected in 1984. Re-elected in 1986. Re-elected in 1988. Re-elected in 1990. Re-elected in 1992. Retired.	Texas Hill Country
Lloyd Doggett (Austin)	Democratic	January 3, 1995 – January 3, 2005	104th 105th 106th 107th 108th	Elected in 1994. Re-elected in 1996. Re-elected in 1998. Re-elected in 2000. Re-elected in 2002. Redistricted to the 25th district.	1995–2005: Travis County, TX: Austin and surrounding suburbs
Michael McCaul (Austin)	Republican	January 3, 2005 – present	109th 110th 111th 112th 113th 114th 115th 116th 117th 118th 119th	Elected in 2004. Re-elected in 2006. Re-elected in 2008. Re-elected in 2010. Re-elected in 2012. Re-elected in 2014. Re-elected in 2016. Re-elected in 2018. Re-elected in 2020. Re-elected in 2022. Re-elected in 2024. Retiring at the end of the term.	2005–2013
Michael McCaul (Austin)	Republican	January 3, 2005 – present	109th 110th 111th 112th 113th 114th 115th 116th 117th 118th 119th	Elected in 2004. Re-elected in 2006. Re-elected in 2008. Re-elected in 2010. Re-elected in 2012. Re-elected in 2014. Re-elected in 2016. Re-elected in 2018. Re-elected in 2020. Re-elected in 2022. Re-elected in 2024. Retiring at the end of the term.	2013–2023 Austin, Bastrop (part), Colorado, Fayette, Harris (part), Lee (part), Travis (part), Waller, Washington
Michael McCaul (Austin)	Republican	January 3, 2005 – present	109th 110th 111th 112th 113th 114th 115th 116th 117th 118th 119th	Elected in 2004. Re-elected in 2006. Re-elected in 2008. Re-elected in 2010. Re-elected in 2012. Re-elected in 2014. Re-elected in 2016. Re-elected in 2018. Re-elected in 2020. Re-elected in 2022. Re-elected in 2024. Retiring at the end of the term.	2023–2027 Austin, Bastrop (part), Brazos, Burleson, Colorado, Fayette, Grimes, Lee, Madison, Travis (part), Waller, Washington, Williamson (part)
Chris Gober (Austin)	Republican	Assuming office on January 3, 2027		Elected in 2026.	

== Recent election results ==
=== 2004 ===
Due to the 2003 mid-decade redistricting plan, the 10th's boundaries were gerrymandered forcing Democratic incumbent Lloyd Doggett to redistrict to the 25th district. Attorney Michael McCaul won the Republican nomination and ran without any major-party opposition.

2004 United States House of Representatives elections in Texas: Texas District 10
Party	Candidate	Votes	%	±%
Republican	Michael McCaul	182,113	78.6	+78.6
Libertarian	Robert Fritsche	35,569	15.4	−0.3
Write-In	Lorenzo Sadun	13,961	6.0	+6.0
Majority		146,544	63.3	
Turnout		231,643		
Republican gain from Democratic		Swing	+81.5	

=== 2006 ===
2006 United States House of Representatives elections in Texas: Texas District 10
Party	Candidate	Votes	%	±%
Republican	Michael McCaul (Incumbent)	97,618	55.32	−23.29
Democratic	Ted Ankrum	71,232	40.37	+40.37
Libertarian	Michael Badnarik	7,603	4.31	−11.04
Majority		26,686	14.95	
Turnout		176,453		
Republican hold		Swing	-48.31	

=== 2008 ===
2008 United States House of Representatives elections in Texas: Texas District 10
Party	Candidate	Votes	%
Republican	Michael McCaul (Incumbent)	179,493	53.9
Democratic	Larry Joe Doherty	143,719	43.1
Libertarian	Matt Finkel	9,871	2.96
Republican hold			

=== 2010 ===
2010 United States House of Representatives elections in Texas: Texas District 10
Party	Candidate	Votes	%
Republican	Michael McCaul (Incumbent)	144,980	64.67
Democratic	Ted Ankrum	74,086	33.05
Libertarian	Jeremiah "JP" Perkins	5,105	2.28
Total votes		224,171	100.00
Republican hold			

=== 2012 ===
2012 United States House of Representatives elections in Texas: Texas District 10
Party	Candidate	Votes	%
Republican	Michael McCaul (Incumbent)	159,783	60.52
Democratic	Tawana Walter-Cadien	95,710	36.25
Libertarian	Richard Priest	8,526	3.23
Republican hold			

=== 2014 ===
2014 United States House of Representatives elections in Texas: Texas's 10th district
Party	Candidate	Votes	%
Republican	Michael McCaul (Incumbent)	109,726	62.2
Democratic	Tawana Walter-Cadien	60,243	34.1
Libertarian	Bill Kelsey	6,491	3.7
Total votes		176,460	100.0
Republican hold			

=== 2016 ===
2016 United States House of Representatives elections in Texas: Texas's 10th district
Party	Candidate	Votes	%
Republican	Michael McCaul (Incumbent)	179,221	57.3
Democratic	Tawana W. Cadien	120,170	38.5
Libertarian	Bill Kelsey	13,209	4.2
Total votes		312,600	100.0
Republican hold			

=== 2018 ===
Incumbent Michael McCaul faced Assistant Attorney of Austin Mike Siegel in the 2018 general election, winning by 4.3 percent of the vote. This is the closest contest McCaul has faced. The outcome was notable in a district that political experts rated as "Heavily Republican."

2018 United States House of Representatives elections in Texas: Texas's 10th district
Party	Candidate	Votes	%
Republican	Michael McCaul (Incumbent)	157,166	51.1
Democratic	Mike Siegel	144,034	46.8
Libertarian	Mike Ryan	6,627	2.1
Total votes		307,827	100.0
Republican hold			

=== 2020 ===
In the November 3, 2020 general election, incumbent Michael McCaul again defeated Austin Assistant Attorney Mike Siegel.

Texas's 10th congressional district, 2020
Party	Candidate	Votes	%
Republican	Michael McCaul (Incumbent)	217,216	52.5
Democratic	Mike Siegel	187,686	45.3
Libertarian	Roy Eriksen	8,992	2.2
Total votes		413,894	100.0
Republican hold			

=== 2022 ===
Texas's 10th congressional district, 2022
Party	Candidate	Votes	%
Republican	Michael McCaul (incumbent)	159,469	63.30
Democratic	Linda Nuno	86,404	34.30
Libertarian	Bill Kelsey	6,064	2.41
Total votes		251,937	100.0
Republican hold			

=== 2024 ===
Texas's 10th congressional district, 2024
Party	Candidate	Votes	%
Republican	Michael McCaul (incumbent)	220,908	65.2
Democratic	Theresa Boisseau	117,937	34.8
Total votes		338,845	100.0
Republican hold			

== See also ==
- List of United States congressional districts
