= Bugtussle =

Bugtussle and Bug Tussle may refer to a community in the United States:

- Bug Tussle, Alabama (rural district)
- Bugtussle, Kentucky (rural district)
- Bugtussle, Oklahoma (unincorporated community)
- Bug Tussle, Texas (rural district)
