= Walter Gresham =

Walter Gresham may refer to:

- Walter Q. Gresham (1832–1895), American statesman and jurist
- Walter Gresham (Texas politician) (1841–1920)
