= George F. Burgess =

American politician and lawyer (1861–1919)

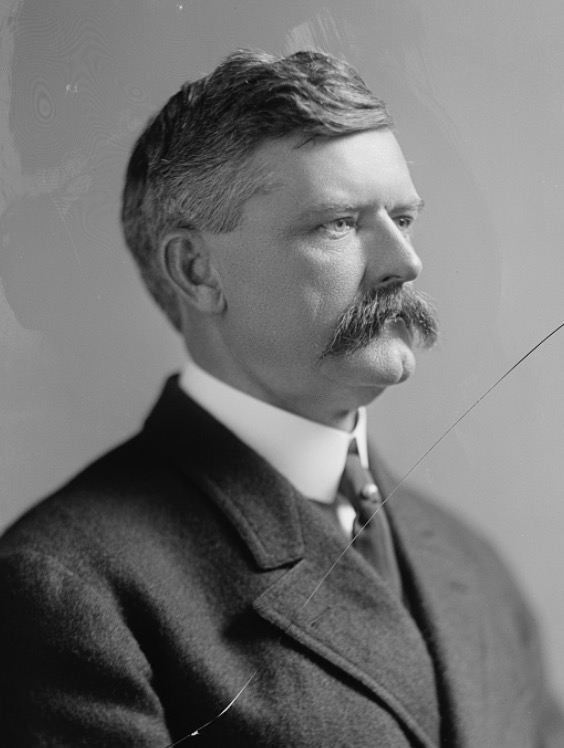
- Portrait of Burgess by Charles Milton Bell, taken between March 1905 and August 1906

Member of the U.S. House of Representatives from Texas
- In office March 4, 1901 – March 3, 1917
- Preceded by: Robert B. Hawley (10th); Albert S. Burleson (9th)
- Succeeded by: Albert S. Burleson (10th); Joseph J. Mansfield (9th)
- Constituency: 10th district (1901–03); 9th district (1903–17)

Personal details
- Born: George Farmer Burgess; September 21, 1861 Wharton, Texas, US
- Died: December 31, 1919 (aged 58) Gonzales, Texas, US
- Party: Democratic
- Occupation: Politician, lawyer

George Farmer Burgess (September 21, 1861 – December 31, 1919) was an American politician and lawyer. A Democrat, he was a member of the United States House of Representatives from Texas.

== Biography ==
Burgess was born on September 21, 1861, in Wharton, Texas, the son of C. H. A. Burgess. He was educated at common schools. In 1880, he and his mother moved to Fayette County. He farmed near Flatonia and worked as a country store clerk. He read law, and in 1882, was admitted to the bar, after which he began practicing in La Grange. In 1884, he moved to Gonzales.

Burgess was a Democrat. He was a Presidential elector in the 1892 election. From 1886 to 1889, he was prosecutor of Gonzales County. He was a member of the United States House of Representatives, from March 4, 1901, to March 3, 1917. He represented Texas's 10th district from 1901 to 1903, then represented its 9th district from 1903 to 1917. He was an unsuccessful candidate in the 1916 United States Senate election in Texas. Ideologically, he was liberal. He opposed monopolies.

After serving in Congress, Burgess returned to practicing law in Gonzalez. On December 28, 1888, he married Marie Louise Sims. He died there on December 31, 1919, aged 58, and was buried at Masonic Cemetery, in Gonzalez.

U.S. House of Representatives
Preceded by Robert B. Hawley	Member of the U.S. House of Representatives from Texas's 10th congressional district 1901–1903	Succeeded by Albert S. Burleson
Preceded by Albert S. Burleson	Member of the U.S. House of Representatives from Texas's 9th congressional district 1903–1917	Succeeded by Joseph J. Mansfield
