= Henry Pomeroy Miller =

American journalist

Roy Miller

Mayor of Corpus Christi, Texas
- In office 1913–1919
- Preceded by: Clark Pease
- Succeeded by: Gordon Boone

Personal details
- Born: Henry Pomeroy Miller; March 27, 1883 Blue Rapids, Kansas, US
- Died: April 28, 1946 (aged 63) Washington, D.C., US
- Party: Democratic
- Spouse: Maud Heaney
- Children: 1
- Education: University of Chicago
- Occupation: Lobbyist

Henry Pomeroy "Roy" Miller (March 27, 1883 – April 28, 1946), once the "boy mayor of Corpus Christi", was a Texas newspaperman, politician, and lobbyist influential in both the state capital Austin and national capital Washington, D.C. He represented sulphur interests in Texas.

== Early life ==
As a boy, he worked as a soda jerk and had three newspaper routes in Houston, until he finished high school as valedictorian at age 15.

He attended the University of Chicago on a scholarship, waited tables, and tutored other students. He was among six lower division students to win a University Prize for excellence in declamation (summer, 1901) and took part in the Freshman Sophomore debate on whether England was right in the Second Boer War (March 15, 1902). He finished his four-year curriculum in three years.

After college, he was a reporter (and railroad editor) at the Houston Post. From about 1905 he was an advertising and immigration agent for Kleberg's St. Louis, Brownsville and Mexico Railway. In that capacity, he ran special trains every other week to promote the sale of farm land along the railroad. From 1907 to 1911 he ran another Kleberg business, The Caller, as its editor.

== Civic booster ==
Roy Miller was elected mayor of Corpus Christi at age 29. During his term of office (1913–1919) the city made major improvements in water supply and paving roads.

Not long after his unsuccessful bid for reelection, Miller headed the relief committee after the 1919 hurricane struck Corpus Christi.

His lobbying efforts, aided by his friendship with U.S. Representative John Nance Garner, led to Corpus Christi's designation as a deep water port and federal appropriations to build the port.

== Lobbyist ==
He was renowned in Austin as a lobbyist who supplied members of the Texas State Legislature with bourbon, beefsteak, and blondes. In Washington, he had a reserved table in the House Restaurant where members could eat at his expense.

He was a successful lobbyist in New Deal Washington, though he was privately contemptuous of President Franklin D. Roosevelt and his policies. Among the Miller group were Representative Martin Dies, Jr., Rep. Richard M. Kleberg, GE lobbyist Horatio H. "Rasch" Adams, Rep. Nat Patton, James P. Buchanan, and Rep. Hatton W. Sumners.

He enjoyed carte blanche access to Rep. Kleberg's office on Capitol Hill. When Kleberg opposed the "socialistic" and "radical" 1933 Agricultural Adjustment Administration bill, Miller and Lyndon Johnson persuaded him to vote 'yes' because it was politically expedient.

He represented the Texas Gulf Sulfur Company, a company that needed deep harbors on the Gulf Coast. He was personally close to Joseph J. Mansfield, Chairman of the House Committee on Rivers and Harbors.
