= 1976 United States House of Representatives elections in Texas =

- November 2, 1976

All 24 Texas seats to the United States House of Representatives
	Majority party	Minority party
Party	Democratic	Republican
Last election	21	3
Seats before	20	4
Seats won	22	2
Seat change	▲2	▼2
Popular vote	2,368,543	1,277,165
Percentage	64.7%	34.9%
Swing	▼7.6%	▲7.5%
Democratic
50–60%
60–70%
70–80%
80–90%
90>%
Republican
70–80%
90>%

The 1976 United States House of Representatives elections in Texas occurred on November 2, 1976, to elect the members of the state of Texas's delegation to the United States House of Representatives. Texas had twenty-four seats in the House apportioned according to the 1970 United States census.

Texas underwent mid-decade redistricting as a result of the U.S. Supreme Court case White v. Weiser. The court's modified districts were used in 1974. In 1975, the Texas Legislature modified the boundaries District 2 and District 6 to move the town of Streetman, which is on the border of Navarro County and Freestone County, fully within the boundaries of District 6.

These elections occurred simultaneously with the United States Senate elections of 1976, the United States House elections in other states, the presidential election, and various state and local elections.

Democrats maintained their majority of U.S. House seats from Texas, gaining two seats from the Republicans, increasing their majority to twenty-two out of twenty-four seats.

== Overview ==
1976 United States House of Representatives elections in Texas
Party	Votes	Percentage	Seats before	Seats after	+/–
Democratic	2,368,543	65.38%	20	22	+2
Republican	1,277,960	35.27%	4	2	-2
American	13,960	0.39%	0	0	-
La Raza Unida	2,515	0.07%	0	0	-
Socialist Workers	735	0.02%	0	0	-
Totals	3,622,918	100.00%	24	24	-

== Congressional districts ==
=== District 1 ===
Incumbent Democrat Wright Patman, the dean of the House, died on March 7, 1976. This prompted a special election to be held, which was won by fellow Democrat Sam B. Hall.

Texas's 1st congressional district, 1976
Party	Candidate	Votes	%
Democratic	Sam B. Hall (incumbent)	135,384	83.72
Republican	James Hogan	26,334	16.28
Total votes		161,718	100
Democratic hold			

=== District 2 ===
Incumbent Democrat Charlie Wilson ran for re-election.

Texas's 2nd congressional district, 1976
Party	Candidate	Votes	%
Democratic	Charlie Wilson (incumbent)	133,910	95.04
American	James Doyle	6,992	4.96
Total votes		140,902	100
Democratic hold			

=== District 3 ===
Incumbent Republican James M. Collins ran for re-election.

Texas's 3rd congressional district, 1976
Party	Candidate	Votes	%
Republican	James M. Collins (incumbent)	171,343	74.04
Democratic	Les Shackelford	60,070	25.96
Total votes		231,413	100
Republican hold			

=== District 4 ===
Incumbent Democrat Ray Roberts ran for re-election.

Texas's 4th congressional district, 1976
Party	Candidate	Votes	%
Democratic	Ray Roberts (incumbent)	105,394	62.72
Republican	Frank Glenn	62,641	37.28
Total votes		168,035	100
Democratic hold			

=== District 5 ===
Incumbent Republican Alan Steelman retired to run for U.S. senator.

Texas's 5th congressional district, 1976
Party	Candidate	Votes	%
Democratic	Jim Mattox	67,871	53.97
Republican	Nancy Judy	56,056	44.57
American	Sam McDonnell	1,841	1.46
Total votes		125,768	100
Democratic gain from Republican			

=== District 6 ===
Incumbent Democrat Olin E. Teague ran for re-election.

Texas's 6th congressional district, 1976
Party	Candidate	Votes	%
Democratic	Olin E. Teague (incumbent)	119,025	65.93
Republican	Wes Mowery	60,316	33.41
American	Harley Pinon	1,193	0.66
Total votes		180,534	100
Democratic hold			

=== District 7 ===
Incumbent Republican Bill Archer ran for re-election unopposed.

Texas's 7th congressional district, 1976
Party	Candidate	Votes	%
Republican	Bill Archer (incumbent)	193,127	100.00
Total votes		193,127	100
Republican hold			

=== District 8 ===
Incumbent Democrat Bob Eckhardt ran for re-election.

Texas's 8th congressional district, 1976
Party	Candidate	Votes	%
Democratic	Bob Eckhardt (incumbent)	84,404	60.65
Republican	Nick Gearhart	54,566	39.21
Socialist Workers	Gene Lantz	193	0.14
Total votes		139,163	100
Democratic hold			

=== District 9 ===
Incumbent Democrat Jack Brooks ran for re-election unopposed.

Texas's 9th congressional district, 1976
Party	Candidate	Votes	%
Democratic	Jack Brooks (incumbent)	112,945	100.00
Total votes		112,945	100
Democratic hold			

=== District 10 ===
Incumbent Democrat J. J. Pickle ran for re-election.

Texas's 10th congressional district, 1976
Party	Candidate	Votes	%
Democratic	J. J. Pickle (incumbent)	160,683	76.82
Republican	Paul McClure	48,482	23.18
Total votes		209,165	100
Democratic hold			

=== District 11 ===
Incumbent Democrat William R. Poage ran for re-election.

Texas's 11th congressional district, 1976
Party	Candidate	Votes	%
Democratic	William R. Poage (incumbent)	92,142	57.40
Republican	Jack Burgess	68,373	42.60
Total votes		160,515	100
Democratic hold			

=== District 12 ===
Incumbent Democrat Jim Wright ran for re-election.

Texas's 12th congressional district, 1976
Party	Candidate	Votes	%
Democratic	Jim Wright (incumbent)	101,814	75.83
Republican	W. R. Durham	31,941	23.79
American	Larry Kutchinski	504	0.38
Total votes		134,259	100
Democratic hold			

=== District 13 ===
Incumbent Democrat Jack Hightower ran for re-election.

Texas's 13th congressional district, 1976
Party	Candidate	Votes	%
Democratic	Jack Hightower (incumbent)	101,798	59.30
Republican	Bob Price	69,328	40.38
American	William Hathcock	547	0.32
Total votes		171,673	100
Democratic hold			

=== District 14 ===
Incumbent Democrat John Andrew Young ran for re-election.

Texas's 14th congressional district, 1976
Party	Candidate	Votes	%
Democratic	John Andrew Young (incumbent)	93,589	61.42
Republican	L. Dean Holford	58,788	38.58
Total votes		152,377	100
Democratic hold			

=== District 15 ===
Incumbent Democrat Kika de la Garza ran for re-election.

Texas's 15th congressional district, 1976
Party	Candidate	Votes	%
Democratic	Kika de la Garza (incumbent)	102,837	74.37
Republican	Lendy McDonald	35,446	25.63
Total votes		138,283	100
Democratic hold			

=== District 16 ===
Incumbent Democrat Richard Crawford White ran for re-election.

Texas's 16th congressional district, 1976
Party	Candidate	Votes	%
Democratic	Richard Crawford White (incumbent)	71,876	57.79
Republican	Vic Shackelford	52,499	42.21
Total votes		124,375	100
Democratic hold			

=== District 17 ===
Incumbent Democrat Omar Burleson ran for re-election unopposed.

Texas's 17th congressional district, 1976
Party	Candidate	Votes	%
Democratic	Omar Burleson (incumbent)	127,613	100.00
Total votes		127,613	100
Democratic hold			

=== District 18 ===
Incumbent Democrat Barbara Jordan ran for re-election.

Texas's 18th congressional district, 1976
Party	Candidate	Votes	%
Democratic	Barbara Jordan (incumbent)	93,953	85.51
Republican	Sam Wright	15,381	14.00
Socialist Workers	Sylvia Zapata	542	0.49
Total votes		109,876	100
Democratic hold			

=== District 19 ===
Incumbent Democrat George H. Mahon ran for re-election.

Texas's 19th congressional district, 1976
Party	Candidate	Votes	%
Democratic	George H. Mahon (incumbent)	87,908	54.64
Republican	Jim Reese	72,991	45.36
Total votes		160,899	100
Democratic hold			

=== District 20 ===
Incumbent Democrat Henry B. González ran for re-election unopposed.

Texas's 20th congressional district, 1976
Party	Candidate	Votes	%
Democratic	Henry B. Gonzalez (incumbent)	90,173	100.00
Total votes		90,173	100
Democratic hold			

=== District 21 ===
Incumbent Democrat Bob Krueger ran for re-election.

Texas's 21st congressional district, 1976
Party	Candidate	Votes	%
Democratic	Bob Krueger (incumbent)	149,395	71.04
Republican	Bobby Locke	56,211	26.73
Raza Unida	Ramon Carrillo	2,515	1.20
American	Ed Gallion	2,179	1.03
Total votes		210,300	100
Democratic hold			

=== District 22 ===
Incumbent Democrat Robert R. Casey resigned to become commissioner to the United States Maritime Commission. This prompted a special election to be held. Republican Ron Paul won the election in a runoff against former State Senator Robert Gammage, running primarily on Libertarian economic issues, flipping the district. He ran for re-election.

Texas's 22nd congressional district, 1976
Party	Candidate	Votes	%
Democratic	Robert Gammage	96,535	50.07
Republican	Ron Paul (incumbent)	96,267	49.93
Total votes		192,802	100
Democratic gain from Republican			

=== District 23 ===
Incumbent Democrat Abraham Kazen ran for re-election unopposed.

Texas's 23rd congressional district, 1976
Party	Candidate	Votes	%
Democratic	Abraham Kazen (incumbent)	96,481	100.00
Total votes		96,481	100
Democratic hold			

=== District 24 ===
Incumbent Democrat Dale Milford ran for re-election.

Texas's 24th congressional district, 1976
Party	Candidate	Votes	%
Democratic	Dale Milford (incumbent)	82,743	63.39
Republican	Leo Berman	47,075	36.07
American	Earl Armstrong	704	0.54
Total votes		130,522	100
Democratic hold			
