= Gus Macey Hodges Jr. =

American lawyer

Gus Macey Hodges Jr. (February 12, 1908 - February 7, 1992) was an American lawyer, and the Albert Sidney Burleson Professor of Law from 1967 to 1970 at University of Texas at Austin. In 1984, the university established the Gus M. Hodges Regents Research Professorship, and in 1992, also established the Gus Macey Hodges Endowed Presidential Scholarship of Law.
