= Miles Crowley =

American politician and lawyer (1859–1921)

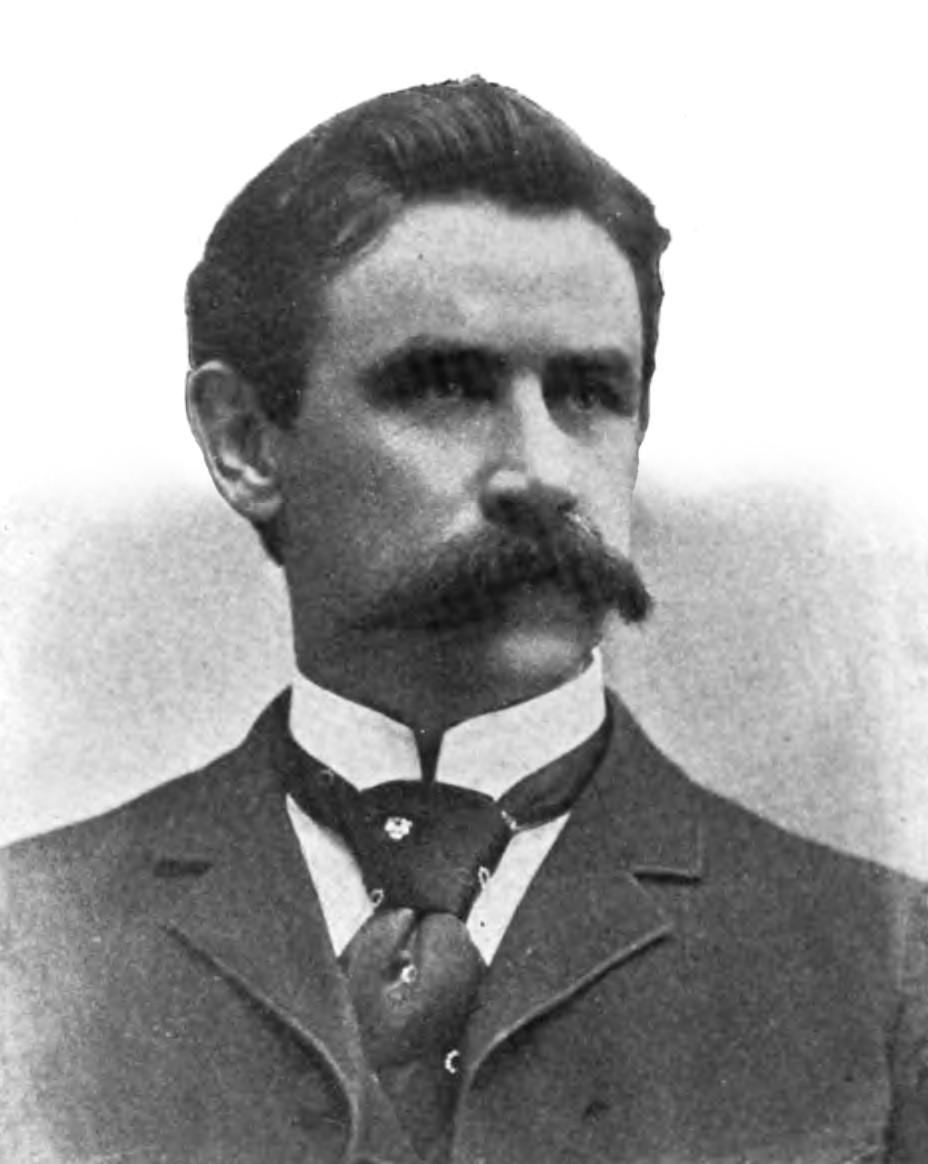
- Crowley in 1895

Member of the U.S. House of Representatives from Texas's 10th district
- In office March 4, 1895 – March 3, 1897
- Preceded by: Walter Gresham
- Succeeded by: Robert B. Hawley

Member of the Texas Senate from the 17th district
- In office January 10, 1893 – March 1, 1895
- Preceded by: Henry Arthur Finch
- Succeeded by: John Edward Linn

Member of the Texas House of Representatives from the 65th district
- In office January 13, 1891 – January 10, 1893
- Preceded by: Walter Gresham
- Succeeded by: Spencer Young

Personal details
- Born: Miles G. Crowley; February 22, 1859 Boston, Massachusetts, US
- Died: September 22, 1921 (aged 62) Galveston County, Texas, US
- Party: Democratic
- Occupation: Politician, lawyer

Miles G. Crowley (February 22, 1859 – September 22, 1921) was an American politician and lawyer. A Democrat, he was a member of the United States House of Representatives from Texas.

Born in Boston to a poor family, Crowley left home at as a child and moved to Galveston, Texas. He worked as a lawyer, and was later elected to either branch of the Texas Legislature. He served in the House from 1895 to 1897, his Congressional career being marked by sensational press coverage about him.

== Early life ==
Crowley was born on February 22, 1859, in Boston, to a poor family. Per one source, he was named Miles because his parents believed he would become a Congressman, so gave him the initials M.C. Crowley was educated at common schools.

At age 11, Crowley ran away from home, becoming a street child and being arrested numerous times. He worked as a sailor and dockworker. In an 1894 speech, he stated that he left the maritime transport industry c. 1884, after a police chief said he worked "like a nigger", in reference to the manual labor of his job.

Crowley lived in New Orleans for several years. However, Times Record News claimed that he travelled from Boston directly to Galveston, Texas as a ship stowaway before age 20. In 1879, he moved to Galveston. For four years, he was assistant chief of the city's fire department. He read law, and in 1892, was admitted to the bar, after which he began practicing law. He was also a reporter for a local newspaper.

== Politics ==
=== Texas Legislature ===
Crowley was a Democrat. In 1891, he was offered the position of city judge, which he refused. He was a member of the Texas House of Representatives, from January 13, 1891, to January 10, 1893, representing the 65th district. He helped make Labor Day a state holiday. While serving, he was chairman of the Committee on Labor, and a member of the Committees on Commerce and Manufactures; on Public Health and Vital Statistics; on Public Printing; on Representation and Apportionment on Senatorial and Representative Districts; and on Town and City Corporations.

Crowley was a member of the Texas Senate, from January 10, 1893, to March 1, 1895, representing the 17th district. While serving, he was chairman of the Committee on Towns and City Corporations, and a member of the Committees on Constitutional Amendments; on Counties and County Boundaries; on Finance; on Insurance, Statistics and History; Judicial Districts; on the Judiciary; on Labor; on Military Affairs; on Penitentiaries; and on Stock and Stockraising.

=== U.S. Congress ===
Crowley was a member of the United States House of Representatives, from March 4, 1895, to March 3, 1897, representing Texas's 10th district. His election was contested. He was not a candidate in the following election. Ideologically, he leaned liberal.

During his Congressional career, Crowley was subject to much sensational press coverage. He believed the media distorted everything he said for the purpose of retaining public interest in him. He disliked it, but tolerated it.

In 1894, lawyer John Wharton Terry published the pamphlet Terry on Crowley, a takedown of his character and criminal accusations against him, including claims of blackmail and corruption. By Crowley's request, Terry presented his pamphlet before the Texas Senate, during which the Senate defended him. After winning the election, Crowley stated that he planned on giving every Congressman a copy of the pamphlet. The New York World also published an article by Alexander Edwin Sweet, accusing Crowley of manslaughter.

== Later career and death ==
After serving in Congress, Crowley returned to practicing law in Galveston. From 1904 to 1912, he was prosecutor of Galveston County. He then served as judge of Galveston County, from 1920 until his death. He died on September 22, 1921, aged 62, in Galveston, and was buried at Calvary Catholic Cemetery. His tombstone reads "at rest".

U.S. House of Representatives
Preceded by Walter Gresham (D)	Member of the U.S. House of Representatives from Texas's 10th congressional district 1895–1897	Succeeded by Robert B. Hawley (R)
