= Robert B. Hawley =

American businessman and politician (1849–1921)

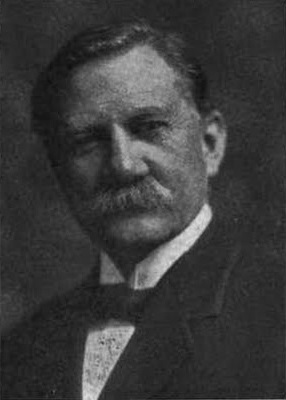

Member of the U.S. House of Representatives from Texas's 10th district
- In office March 4, 1897 – March 3, 1901
- Preceded by: Miles Crowley
- Succeeded by: George Farmer Burgess

Personal details
- Born: October 25, 1849 Memphis, Tennessee, US
- Died: November 28, 1921 (aged 72) New York City, US
- Party: Republican
- Education: Christian Brothers College
- Occupation: Merchant; President and founder of the Cuban American Sugar Company

Robert Bradley Hawley (October 25, 1849 – November 28, 1921) was a businessman and politician from Galveston, Texas, elected as a Republican U.S. Representative (1897–1901) from Texas's 10th congressional district. He won his office in 1896 and 1898 with a plurality, as white voters split between Democratic and Populist party candidates.

== Early life and education ==
Born in Memphis, Tennessee, in 1849, Hawley attended Catholic parochial schools and the Christian Brothers College there. After his father died, Hawley took on the duties of caring for his mother and siblings while still in his teens. He studied law under a Judge Bowman of Louisiana.

== Move to Texas and early career ==
Hawley moved to Galveston in 1875 at the age of 21. He never practiced law, however, instead becoming a merchant, importer, and manufacturer in the bustling port city for the next 20 years. On December 11, 1878, he married Mary Drake Rice with whom he had a daughter. He was elected to serve as president of the Galveston Board of Education from 1889 to 1893.

== Political career ==
Hawley became active in Republican Party politics in the waning years of the Reconstruction era, a time when Texas was almost completely dominated by the Democratic Party. The Galveston area was a center of an urbanized population, including many German immigrants and African-American freedmen, groups that favored the Republican Party. On September 4, 1890, Hawley was elected as the temporary chairman of the Republican state convention in San Antonio. He served as a delegate to several Republican national conventions.

In 1896, the one-term Democratic Congressman Miles Crowley chose not to run for reelection in Texas's 10th congressional district, which at the time included Galveston County. Hawley ran and was elected to the 55th Congress. A 16-year-old Albert Lasker worked as a reporter on the campaign before moving to Chicago and a career in advertising. Hawley successfully ran for reelection in 1898 for the 56th Congress.

In each election, Hawley triumphed with less than 50% of the vote, due to much of the white vote being split between the Democrats and the new Populist Party. During his four years in Congress, he was the only Republican elected from Texas.

In office when Galveston was destroyed by the powerful 1900 hurricane, Hawley decided not to seek reelection. Hawley also realized the likely effects of the poll tax passed by the Texas Legislature in 1901, which sharply reduced voting by minorities and poor whites. Total voter participation dropped markedly in the state in the early 1900s, essentially ending Republican and Populist competition and leaving elections to be dominated by white Democrats. From 1890 to 1910, all states of the former Confederacy passed measures to disfranchise blacks and exclude them from the political process.

He was succeeded by the Democrat George Farmer Burgess.

== Later years and death ==
Hawley returned to his business pursuits in Galveston and helped in rebuilding the city. In 1899, taking advantage of the situation in following the Spanish–American War, Hawley acquired 77,000 acres of land in Cuba and established the Cuban American Sugar Company. He served as its president, adding to his business fortunes following his congressional tenure.

In 1921, he was living at 36 Gramercy Park in New York City with his good friend, artist Arthur G. Learned and Mr. Learned's wife Leila. On the evening of November 27, he was ill with indigestion. Administered a "restorative", he fell asleep around 4 a.m., but was found dead in his bed four hours later on the morning on November 28, 1921.

== Legacy and honors ==
Hawley, Texas, in Jones County is named in his honor.

In 1899, Jonathan Pierce, the postmaster of Deming's Bridge, in Matagorda County, Texas, successfully lodged to have the post office and cemetery renamed to Hawley in thanks for the congressman securing Pierce's son an appointment to the United States Naval Academy. It has since become a ghost town.

== Election results ==
1896 U.S. House Texas Congressional District 10 Election.
Party	Candidate	Votes	%
Republican	Robert B. Hawley	17,936	45.8
Democratic	J.H. Shelburne	15,757	40.2
Populist	Noah Allen	5,476	14

1898 U.S. House Texas Congressional District 10 Election.
Party	Candidate	Votes	%
Republican	Robert B. Hawley	17,757	48
Democratic	W.S. Robson	16,462	44.5
Populist	J.W. Baird	2,604	7
Independent	Frank Gary	186	0.5

== Sources ==
- United States Congress. "Robert B. Hawley (id: H000378)". Biographical Directory of the United States Congress.

U.S. House of Representatives
Preceded by Miles Crowley	Member of the U.S. House of Representatives from Texas's 10th congressional district 1897–1901	Succeeded by George Farmer Burgess
