= James P. Buchanan =

American politician (1867–1937)

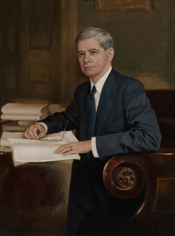

Member of the U.S. House of Representatives from Texas's 10th district
- In office April 15, 1913 – February 22, 1937
- Preceded by: Albert S. Burleson
- Succeeded by: Lyndon B. Johnson

Member of the Texas House of Representatives
- In office January 12, 1909 – April 1, 1913
- Preceded by: Henry Frank Schlosshan
- Succeeded by: Sam D.W. Low Sr.
- Constituency: 47th district (1910–13); 69th district (1913)

Personal details
- Born: James Paul Buchanan; April 30, 1867 Midway, Orangeburg County, South Carolina, U.S.
- Died: February 22, 1937 (aged 69) Washington, D.C., U.S.
- Resting place: Prairie Lea Cemetery, Brenham, Texas
- Party: Democratic Party
- Occupation: Attorney

James Paul "Buck" Buchanan (April 30, 1867 – February 22, 1937) served as U.S. Representative from the 10th district of Texas from 1913 until his death on February 22, 1937.

== Biography ==
Buchanan was born in Midway, Orangeburg County, South Carolina, on April 30, 1867; later that year, his family moved to Texas and settled near Chappell Hill in Washington County. He attended the local schools of Chappell Hill, and in 1889 he received his law degree from the University of Texas at Austin.

Later in 1889, Buchanan began a law practice in Washington County, and almost immediately became involved in politics as a Democrat. He served as a county justice of the peace from 1889 to 1892, and as the county's prosecuting attorney from 1892 to 1899. From 1899 to 1906, Buchanan was the district attorney for the twenty-first judicial district.

Buchanan was a member of the Texas House of Representatives from 1906 to 1913. In 1913, he was elected to the Sixty-third Congress, filling the vacancy left by the resignation of Albert Sidney Burleson. Buchanan was elected to a full term in the Sixty-fourth Congress, and won reelection eleven times. He served in the US House from April 15, 1913 to February 22, 1937, and was the chairman of the House Committee on Appropriations from 1933 until his death.

During the 1930s, Buchanan was recognized as a member of the Miller Group, conservative Democrats who were opposed to Franklin D. Roosevelt and the New Deal, and led by lobbyist Henry Pomeroy Miller.

== Death and burial ==
Buchanan died in Washington, D.C., on February 22, 1937. He was buried at Prairie Lea Cemetery in Brenham, Texas.

He was succeeded in Congress by Lyndon B. Johnson, then the head of the National Youth Administration in Texas and an ardent New Dealer, who later became the 36th president of the United States.

== Legacy ==
Buchanan Dam and the lake it forms, Lake Buchanan, are named in his honor. Both are located about 12 miles (19 km) west of Burnet, Texas.

== See also ==
- List of members of the United States Congress who died in office (1900–1949)

Texas House of Representatives
Preceded by Henry Schlosshan	Member of the Texas House of Representatives from District 47 (Brenham); 1909–1913	Succeeded by T. G. Collins
Preceded by Joe Coffey	Member of the Texas House of Representatives from District 69 (Brenham); 1913	Succeeded by Sam D. W. Low
U.S. House of Representatives
Preceded by Albert S. Burleson	Member of the U.S. House of Representatives from Texas's 10th congressional district 1913-1937	Succeeded by Lyndon B. Johnson
