= Dale Milford =

American politician from Texas (1926–1997)

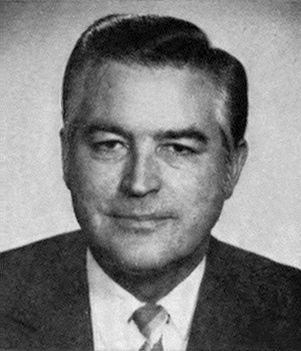

Member of the U.S. House of Representatives from Texas's 24th district
- In office January 3, 1973 – January 3, 1979
- Preceded by: Constituency established
- Succeeded by: Martin Frost

Personal details
- Born: February 18, 1926 Bug Tussle, Texas
- Died: December 26, 1997 (aged 71) Howe, Texas
- Resting place: Honey Grove, Texas
- Party: Democratic
- Education: Baylor University

Military service
- Branch/service: United States Army
- Years of service: 1944–1957
- Rank: Captain

Dale Milford (February 18, 1926 – December 26, 1997) was a U.S. representative from Texas.

He was born in Bug Tussle, Texas, and attended its public schools, then Baylor University in Waco from 1953 to 1957. He served in the United States Army from 1944 to 1953, attaining the rank of captain. Milford was a consultant in aviation and meteorology prior to going to Congress and operated a commercial flight service as well, until 1958. From 1953-58, Milford was a staff meteorologist for KWTX-TV in Waco, then moved into the major markets in the same capacity at WFAA-TV from 1958-71. He was a delegate to the Texas State Democratic convention of 1972.

Milford was elected as a Democrat to the 93rd, 94th, and 95th Congresses. He was an unsuccessful candidate for renomination in 1978 to the 96th Congress. He was a resident of Howe, Texas, until his death there on December 26, 1997. He was interred at Dial Cemetery in Honey Grove, Texas.

== Sources ==
- United States Congress. "Dale Milford (id: M000708)". Biographical Directory of the United States Congress.

U.S. House of Representatives
Preceded by District created	Member of the U.S. House of Representatives from Texas's 24th congressional district 1973–1979	Succeeded by Martin Frost
