= 1974 United States House of Representatives elections in Texas =

- November 5, 1974

All 24 Texas seats to the United States House of Representatives
	Majority party	Minority party
Party	Democratic	Republican
Last election	20	4
Seats won	21	3
Seat change	▲1	▼1
Popular vote	1,074,982	406,744
Percentage	72.2%	27.3%
Swing	▲1.8%	▼1.6%
Democratic
50–60%
60–70%
70–80%
80–90%
90>%
Republican
50–60%
60–70%
70–80%

The 1974 United States House of Representatives elections in Texas occurred on November 5, 1974, to elect the members of the state of Texas's delegation to the United States House of Representatives. Texas had twenty-four seats in the House, apportioned according to the 1970 United States census.

Texas underwent mid-decade redistricting as a result of the U.S. Supreme Court case White v. Weiser. A District Court had ruled the legislature's districts unconstitutional due to their average population deviation of 0.745%, which violated the one man, one vote principle established by Wesberry v. Sanders. The District Court had also ruled against the Texas Legislature's incumbency protection justification for the district's deviation, but this ruling was not held upon appeal to the Supreme Court. The Supreme Court placed the lower court in charge of redrawing the map, which it did in time for the 1974 elections.

These elections occurred simultaneously with the United States Senate elections of 1974, the United States House elections in other states, and various state and local elections.

Democrats maintained their majority of U.S. House seats from Texas, gaining one seat from the Republicans, increasing their majority to twenty-one out of twenty-four seats.

== Overview ==
1974 United States House of Representatives elections in Texas
Party	Votes	Percentage	Seats before	Seats after	+/–
Democratic	1,074,982	72.23%	20	21	+1
Republican	406,744	27.33%	4	3	-1
American	4,754	0.32%	0	0	-
Socialist Workers	1,120	0.07%	0	0	-
Independent	650	0.04%	0	0	-
Totals	1,488,250	100.00%	24	24	-

== Congressional districts ==
=== District 1 ===
Incumbent Democrat Wright Patman, the dean of the House, ran for re-election.

Texas's 1st congressional district, 1974
Party	Candidate	Votes	%
Democratic	Wright Patman (incumbent)	49,426	68.60
Republican	James Farris	22,619	31.40
Total votes		72,045	100
Democratic hold			

=== District 2 ===
Incumbent Democrat Charlie Wilson ran for re-election unopposed.

Texas's 2nd congressional district, 1974
Party	Candidate	Votes	%
Democratic	Charlie Wilson (incumbent)	57,096	100.00
Total votes		57,096	100
Democratic hold			

=== District 3 ===
Incumbent Republican James M. Collins ran for re-election.

Texas's 3rd congressional district, 1974
Party	Candidate	Votes	%
Republican	James M. Collins (incumbent)	63,489	64.71
Democratic	Harold Collum	34,623	35.29
Total votes		98,112	100
Republican hold			

=== District 4 ===
Incumbent Democrat Ray Roberts ran for re-election.

Texas's 4th congressional district, 1974
Party	Candidate	Votes	%
Democratic	Ray Roberts (incumbent)	48,209	74.95
Republican	Dick LeTourneau	16,113	25.05
Total votes		64,322	100
Democratic hold			

=== District 5 ===
Incumbent Republican Alan Steelman ran for re-election.

Texas's 5th congressional district, 1974
Party	Candidate	Votes	%
Republican	Alan Steelman (incumbent)	28,446	52.06
Democratic	Mike McKool	26,190	47.94
Total votes		54,636	100
Republican hold			

=== District 6 ===
Incumbent Democrat Olin E. Teague ran for re-election.

Texas's 6th congressional district, 1974
Party	Candidate	Votes	%
Democratic	Olin E. Teague (incumbent)	53,345	83.02
Republican	Carl Nigliazzo	10,908	16.98
Total votes		64,253	100
Democratic hold			

=== District 7 ===
Incumbent Republican Bill Archer ran for re-election.

Texas's 7th congressional district, 1974
Party	Candidate	Votes	%
Republican	Bill Archer (incumbent)	70,363	79.16
Democratic	Jim Brady	18,524	20.84
Total votes		88,887	100
Republican hold			

=== District 8 ===
Incumbent Democrat Bob Eckhardt ran for re-election.

Texas's 8th congressional district, 1974
Party	Candidate	Votes	%
Democratic	Bob Eckhardt (incumbent)	30,158	72.21
Republican	Donald Whitefield	11,605	27.79
Total votes		41,763	100
Democratic hold			

=== District 9 ===
Incumbent Democrat Jack Brooks ran for re-election.

Texas's 9th congressional district, 1974
Party	Candidate	Votes	%
Democratic	Jack Brooks (incumbent)	37,275	61.91
Republican	Coleman Ferguson	22,935	38.09
Total votes		60,210	100
Democratic hold			

=== District 10 ===
Incumbent Democrat J. J. Pickle ran for re-election.

Texas's 10th congressional district, 1974
Party	Candidate	Votes	%
Democratic	J. J. Pickle (incumbent)	76,240	80.42
Republican	Paul Weiss	18,560	19.58
Total votes		94,800	100
Democratic hold			

=== District 11 ===
Incumbent Democrat William R. Poage ran for re-election.

Texas's 11th congressional district, 1974
Party	Candidate	Votes	%
Democratic	William R. Poage (incumbent)	46,828	81.64
Republican	Don Clements	9,883	17.23
Independent	Laurel Dunn	650	1.13
Total votes		57,361	100
Democratic hold			

=== District 12 ===
Incumbent Democrat Jim Wright ran for re-election.

Texas's 12th congressional district, 1974
Party	Candidate	Votes	%
Democratic	Jim Wright (incumbent)	42,632	78.69
Republican	James Garvey	11,543	21.31
Total votes		54,175	100
Democratic hold			

=== District 13 ===
Incumbent Republican Bob Price ran for re-election.

Texas's 13th congressional district, 1974
Party	Candidate	Votes	%
Democratic	Jack Hightower	53,094	57.60
Republican	Bob Price (incumbent)	39,087	42.40
Total votes		92,181	100
Democratic gain from Republican			

=== District 14 ===
Incumbent Democrat John Andrew Young ran for re-election unopposed.

Texas's 14th congressional district, 1974
Party	Candidate	Votes	%
Democratic	John Andrew Young (incumbent)	41,066	100.00
Total votes		41,066	100
Democratic hold			

=== District 15 ===
Incumbent Democrat Kika de la Garza ran for re-election unopposed.

Texas's 15th congressional district, 1974
Party	Candidate	Votes	%
Democratic	Kika de la Garza (incumbent)	42,567	100.00
Total votes		42,567	100
Democratic hold			

=== District 16 ===
Incumbent Democrat Richard Crawford White ran for re-election unopposed.

Texas's 16th congressional district, 1974
Party	Candidate	Votes	%
Democratic	Richard Crawford White (incumbent)	42,880	100.00
Total votes		42,880	100
Democratic hold			

=== District 17 ===
Incumbent Democrat Omar Burleson ran for re-election unopposed.

Texas's 17th congressional district, 1974
Party	Candidate	Votes	%
Democratic	Omar Burleson (incumbent)	64,595	100.00
Total votes		64,595	100
Democratic hold			

=== District 18 ===
Incumbent Democrat Barbara Jordan ran for re-election.

Texas's 18th congressional district, 1974
Party	Candidate	Votes	%
Democratic	Barbara Jordan (incumbent)	36,597	84.78
Republican	Robbins Mitchell	6,053	14.02
Socialist Workers	Kris Vasquez	518	1.20
Total votes		43,168	100
Democratic hold			

=== District 19 ===
Incumbent Democrat George H. Mahon ran for re-election unopposed.

Texas's 19th congressional district, 1974
Party	Candidate	Votes	%
Democratic	George H. Mahon (incumbent)	49,619	100.00
Total votes		49,619	100
Democratic hold			

=== District 20 ===
Incumbent Democrat Henry B. González ran for re-election unopposed.

Texas's 20th congressional district, 1974
Party	Candidate	Votes	%
Democratic	Henry B. Gonzalez (incumbent)	39,358	100.00
Total votes		39,358	100
Democratic hold			

=== District 21 ===
Incumbent Democrat O. C. Fisher opted to retire rather than run for re-election.

Texas's 21st congressional district, 1974
Party	Candidate	Votes	%
Democratic	Bob Krueger	53,543	52.62
Republican	Douglas Harlan	45,959	45.17
American	Ed Gallion	2,254	2.21
Total votes		101,756	100
Democratic hold			

=== District 22 ===
Incumbent Democrat Robert R. Casey ran for re-election.

Texas's 22nd congressional district, 1974
Party	Candidate	Votes	%
Democratic	Robert R. Casey (incumbent)	47,783	69.54
Republican	Ron Paul	19,483	28.35
American	James Smith	847	1.23
Socialist Workers	Jill Fein	602	0.88
Total votes		68,715	100
Democratic hold			

=== District 23 ===
Incumbent Democrat Abraham Kazen ran for re-election unopposed.

Texas's 23rd congressional district, 1974
Party	Candidate	Votes	%
Democratic	Abraham Kazen (incumbent)	47,249	100.00
Total votes		47,249	100
Democratic hold			

=== District 24 ===
Incumbent Democrat Dale Milford ran for re-election.

Texas's 24th congressional district, 1974
Party	Candidate	Votes	%
Democratic	Dale Milford (incumbent)	36,085	76.07
Republican	Joseph Beaman	9,698	20.44
American	Earl Armstrong	1,653	3.49
Total votes		47,436	100
Democratic hold			
