= Joseph J. Mansfield =

American politician

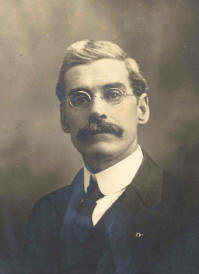
- Joseph J. Mansfield, c. 1910

Member of the U.S. House of Representatives from Texas's 9th district
- In office March 4, 1917 – July 12, 1947
- Preceded by: George F. Burgess
- Succeeded by: Clark W. Thompson

Personal details
- Born: Joseph Jefferson Mansfield; February 9, 1861 Wayne, West Virginia
- Died: July 12, 1947 (aged 86) Bethesda, Maryland
- Party: Democratic
- Occupation: lawyer

Joseph Jefferson Mansfield (February 9, 1861 – July 12, 1947) was a member of the United States House of Representatives from the U.S. state of Texas from 1917 to 1947.

== Biography ==
Mansfield was born on February 9, 1861. He was born in Wayne, West Virginia. However, when he was born this was still part of the state of Virginia. He attended the public schools in West Virginia.

In 1881 he moved to Texas, settling in the community of Alleyton. Here he worked in farm and railroad laboring jobs.

In 1886, he was admitted to the bar. By this time he had relocated to Eagle Lake, Texas. This was a busy year for Mansfield, as he also organized two companies of the Texas National Guard. About this time he also began the first newspaper in Eagle Lake. Mansfield rose to the rank of captain in the National Guard.

In 1889 he was elected mayor of Eagle Lake. In 1892 he became the county prosecutor of Colorado County where both Alleyton and Eagle Lake are located. From 1896 until 1916 he served as judge of Colorado County. Until 1910 this also made him the effective superintendent of schools for the county.

He was elected to Congress as a Democrat in 1916. In the early 1920s, he became paralyzed, and used a wheelchair to get around the Capitol for 25 years. He served in Congress until his death at Bethesda, Maryland on July 12, 1947.

From the Seventy-second Congress until the Seventy-ninth Congress he served as chairman of the House Committee on Rivers and Harbors. Mansfield Dam is named after him.

== Personal life ==
On January 18, 1888, Mansfield married Annie Scott Bruce (1867–1937). They had four children together, their son Bruce Jefferson Mansfield (c.1890-1966), and their daughters Susie (died in infancy), Margaret (1893–1970), and Jaquelin (1900–1997).

== See also ==
- List of members of the United States Congress who died in office (1900–1949)

== Notes ==
U.S. House of Representatives
Preceded by George F. Burgess	Member of the U.S. House of Representatives from Texas's 9th congressional district March 4, 1917 – July 12, 1947	Succeeded by Clark W. Thompson
