= Walter Gresham (Texas politician) =

American politician and lawyer (1841–1920)

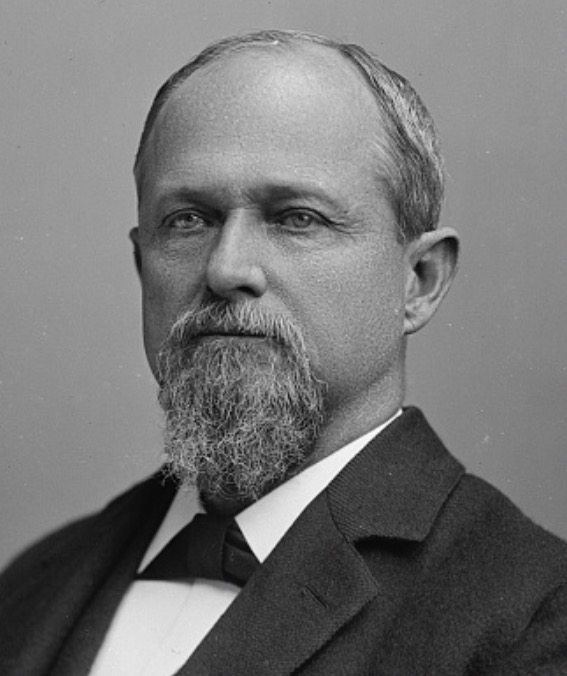
- Portrait of Gresham by Charles Milton Bell, taken between February 1894 and February 1901

Member of the U.S. House of Representatives from Texas's 10th district
- In office March 4, 1893 – March 3, 1895
- Preceded by: Joseph D. Sayers
- Succeeded by: Miles Crowley

Member of the Texas House of Representatives
- In office January 11, 1887 – January 10, 1893
- Preceded by: Guy M. Bryan (64th); Lorenzo Clarke Fisher (65th)
- Succeeded by: John Wesley Alston (64th); Miles Crowley (65th)
- Constituency: 65th district (1887–1891); 64th district (1891–1893)

Personal details
- Born: July 22, 1841 Newtown, King and Queen County, Virginia, US
- Died: November 6, 1920 (aged 79) Washington, D.C., US
- Resting place: Lakeview Cemetery
- Party: Democratic
- Occupation: Politician, lawyer

Military service
- Allegiance: Confederate States of America
- Branch/service: Confederate States Army
- Years of service: 1861–1865
- Rank: Private
- Unit: 24th Virginia Cavalry Regiment
- Battles/wars: American Civil War; Battle of Appomattox Court House

Walter Gresham (July 22, 1841 – November 6, 1920) was an American politician and lawyer. A Democrat, he was a member of the United States House of Representatives from Texas.

Born in Virginia, Gresham studied at the University of Virginia School of Law and fought in the American Civil War. He moved to Texas in 1866, where he practiced law. He was a member of the Texas House of Representatives from 1887 to 1893, and was a member of the United States House from 1893 to 1895.

== Early life and military service ==
Gresham was born on July 22, 1841, at "Woodlawn", near Newtown, King and Queen County, Virginia, the son of Edward Gresham and Isabella (née Mann) Gresham. He was of English ancestry, with ancestors of nobility.

Educated at private schools, Gresham attended academies of Edgehill and Stevensville. From fall 1861 to June 1863, he studied at the University of Virginia School of Law, graduating with a Bachelor of Laws.

At the outbreak of the American Civil War, Gresham enlisted as a private in the Confederate States Army, serving under W. H. F. Lee. He suffered illness and injuries while in battle, and while recuperating, attended the University of Virginia, being allowed to do so by the Confederate States Secretary of War. Returning to battle, he served in the 24th Virginia Cavalry Regiment. He participated in the majority of the battles which took place in Northern Virginia, including the Battle of Appomattox Court House.

== Career ==
=== Law ===
The war improverished Gresham. On December 31, 1866, he moved to Galveston, Texas. He read law, and in 1867, was admitted to the bar, after which he began practicing in Galveston. In 1872, he was made district attorney of Brazoria and Galveston Counties. He was in a partnership with Walter L. Mann until his death in 1875. He practiced alone until 1878, when he partnered with S. W. Jones.

After serving in Congress, Gresham returned to practicing law in Galveston. He was an attorney and shareholder of the Gulf, Colorado and Santa Fe Railway, which he at times served as director and the second vice-president of.

=== Politics ===
Gresham was a Democrat. He was a member of the Texas House of Representatives, from January 11, 1887, to January 10, 1893. In his first two terms, he represented the 65th district, and in his last term, the 64th district.

While in the Texas House, Gresham was chairman of the Committee on Finance and on Ways and Means, and was a member of the Committees on Constitutional Amendments; on Insurance, Statistics and History; on Internal Improvement; on the Judiciary; on Private Land Claims; on Public Health and Vital Statistics; on Representation and Apportionment on Congressional Districts; on Revision of Rules; and on Rules.

Gresham was a member of the United States House of Representatives, from March 4, 1893, to March 3, 1895, representing Texas's 10th district. He lost the following election. Ideologically, he was liberal.

Gresham was a delegate to numerous political conventions; at one, he helped amend the Rivers and Harbors Bill. In 1888, he chaired a committee to fund a harbor on the Gulf of Mexico. In 1900, he was a member of the Galveston Deep Water Committee, which pushed for the construction of a harbor in Galveston.

== Personal life and death ==
On October 28, 1868, Gresham married Josephine Cory Mann, with whom he had nine children. His wife, who shared her maiden name with his mother, was a first cousin. Physically, he was 5 ft 8 in (1.73 m) tall and weighed 170 pounds (77 kg).

Gresham died on November 6, 1920, aged 79, at the Ebbitt Hotel in Washington, D.C. He was buried on November 10, at Lakeview Cemetery, in Galveston. His house, Bishop's Palace, is listed on the National Register of Historic Places.

U.S. House of Representatives
Preceded by Joseph D. Sayers	Member of the U.S. House of Representatives from Texas's 10th congressional district 1893–1895	Succeeded by Miles Crowley
