= Albert S. Burleson =

American politician (1863–1937)

Albert Burleson
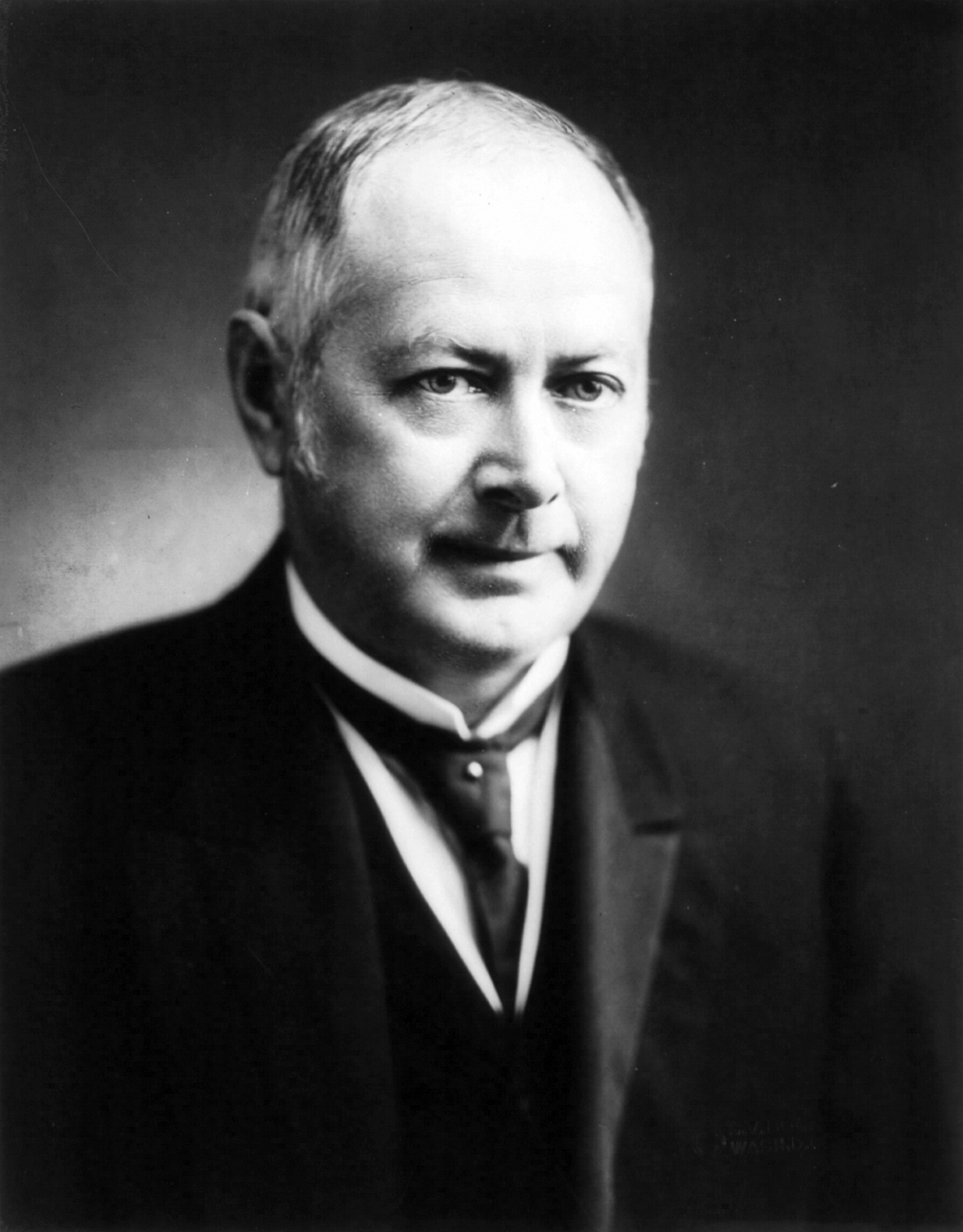
- Burleson in 1914

45th United States Postmaster General
- In office March 5, 1913 – March 4, 1921
- President: Woodrow Wilson
- Preceded by: Frank H. Hitchcock
- Succeeded by: Will H. Hays

Member of the U.S. House of Representatives from Texas
- In office March 4, 1899 – March 6, 1913
- Preceded by: Joseph D. Sayers
- Succeeded by: James P. Buchanan
- Constituency: 9th district (1899–1903); 10th district (1903–1913)

Personal details
- Born: Albert Sidney Burleson; June 7, 1863 San Marcos, Texas, C.S.
- Died: November 24, 1937 (aged 74) San Marcos, Texas, U.S.
- Party: Democratic
- Education: Texas A&M University; Baylor University (BA); University of Texas at Austin (LLB)

Albert Sidney Burleson (June 7, 1863 – November 24, 1937) was a progressive Democrat who served as United States Postmaster General and Representative in Congress. He was a strong supporter of William Jennings Bryan and Woodrow Wilson and so Wilson appointed him to the cabinet role heading the U.S. Post Office. He expanded parcel post, rural free delivery, and air mail service. After America entered World War I in 1917, he stopped the mail delivery of anti-war publications and clamped down on free speech, actions that have been heavily criticized ever since.

== Early life ==
Born in San Marcos, Texas, Burleson came from a wealthy Southern planter family. His father, Edward Burleson, Jr., was a Confederate officer. His grandfather, Edward Burleson, was a soldier and statesman in the Republic of Texas and the early State of Texas. In his early political career, Burleson represented Texas in the House of Representatives, where he was active in promoting the development of agriculture. According to his biographer Adrian Anderson, his 1898 platform showed:

evidences of agrarian liberalism. He called for a reduction in the tariff, prison terms for violators of antitrust laws, restriction of immigration, limitations on the use of injunctions against labor unions, and a national amendment allowing the enactment of an income tax. He denounced national banks and repeated his plea for free coinage of silver.

== Postmaster General ==
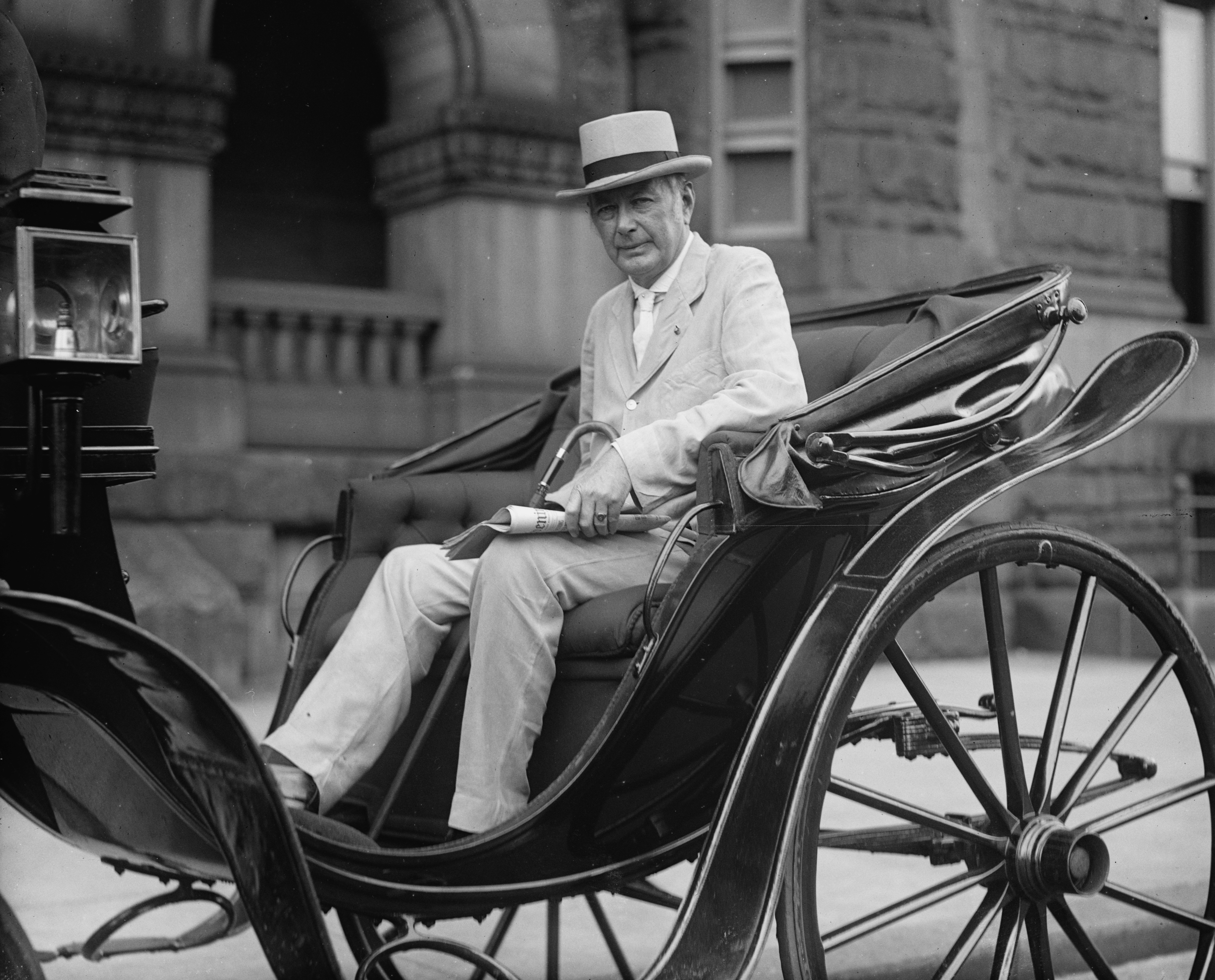
1920 Postmaster General Albert S. Burleson

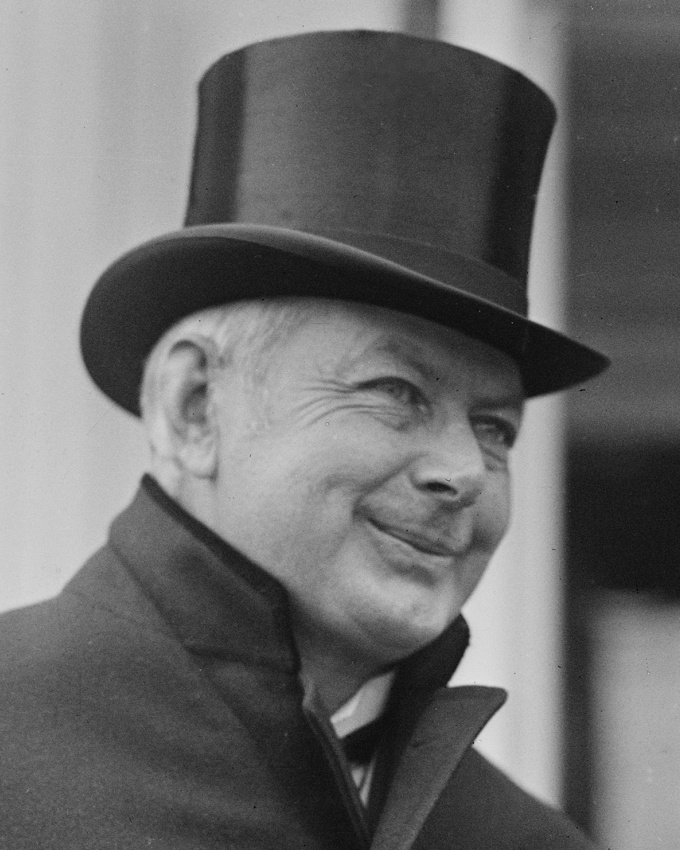
Albert Sidney Burleson in the 1910s

Burleson played a major role in securing the Texas delegation for Woodrow Wilson in 1912, and he became one of the President's most trusted advisors. In 1913, he was appointed Postmaster General. To his credit, he initiated the parcel post and air mail services, increasing mail service to rural areas. Samuel Walker states, "Burleson holds the dubious distinction of being the worst member of the entire Wilson administration on civil liberties." According to historian G. J. Meyer, Burleson "has been called the worst postmaster general in American history, but that is unfair; he introduced parcel post and airmail and improved rural service. It is fair to say, however, that he may have been the worst human being ever to serve as postmaster general".

In 1913, Burleson began segregating the postal employees by race. Burleson also fired black postal workers in the South. He drew criticism from labor unions by forbidding postal employees to strike.

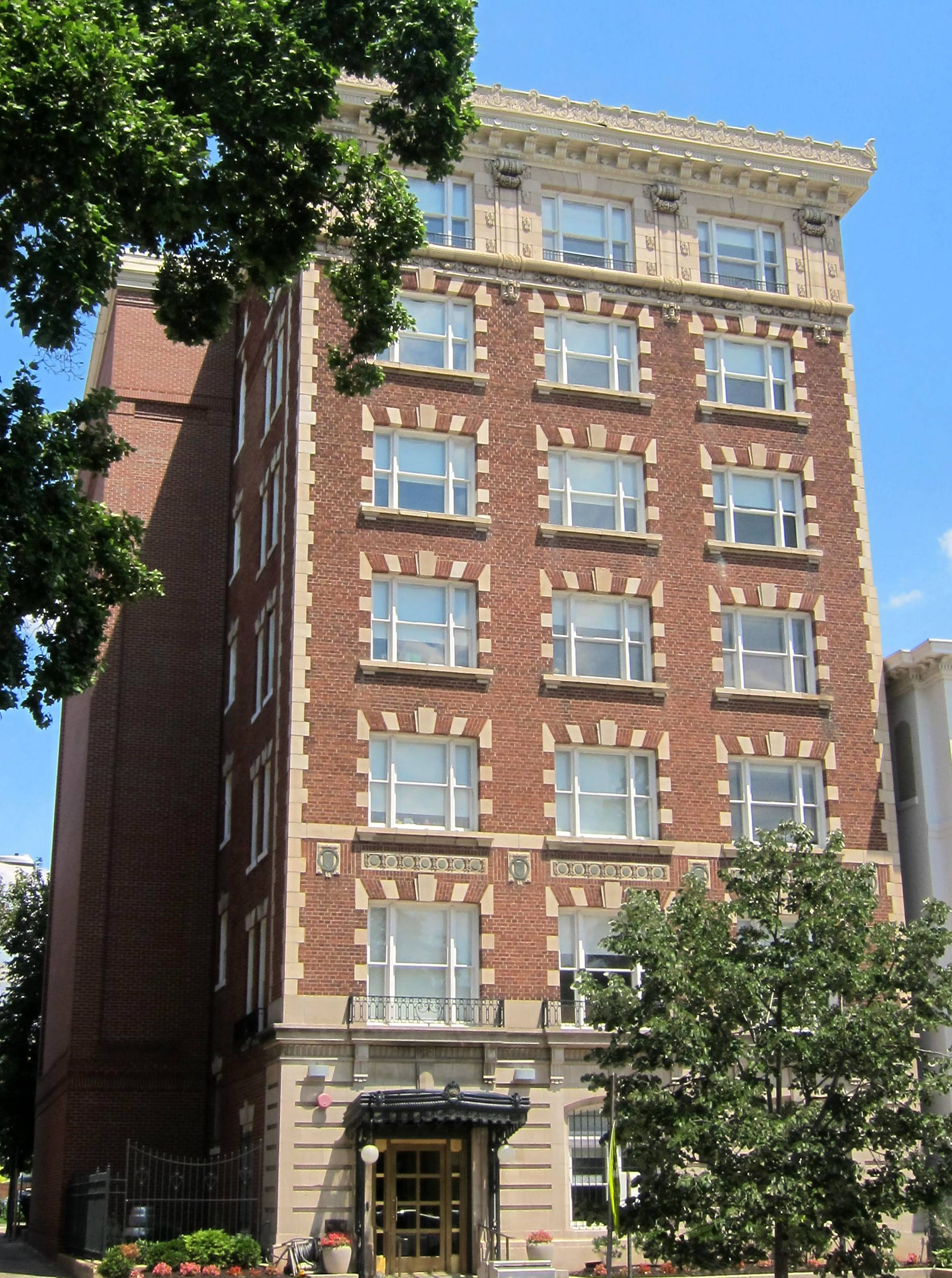
Burleson lived in this apartment/hotel on 16th Street NW while in Washington, D.C.

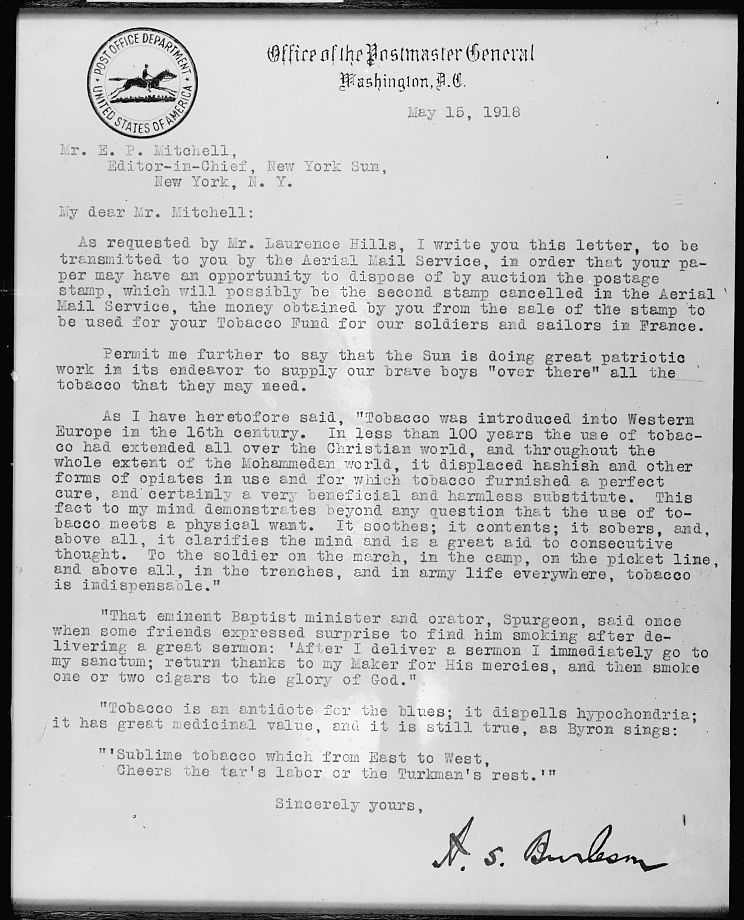
One of the first letters delivered by U.S. Airmail, written by Burleson

In 1913, Burleson aroused a storm of protest, especially on the part of the large daily newspapers, by declaring that he would enforce the law requiring publications to print, among other things, a sworn statement of paid circulation, which had been held in abeyance by his predecessor until its constitutionality might be confirmed. The Supreme Court enjoined him from doing so.

After the United States entered the World War in 1917, Burleson vigorously enforced the Espionage Act, ordering local postmasters to send to him any illegal or suspicious material that they found. The distribution by mail of major anti-war magazines, such as Emma Goldman's Mother Earth and Max Eastman's The Masses, was slowed drastically, and often, were never delivered. Burleson banned anti-war material from being delivered by Post Office personnel. It was impossible to draw an ideal line, and the result was a general alienation of the press. From June 1918 to July 1919, the Post Office Department operated the nation's telephone and telegraph services, an arrangement Burleson had advocated at least as early as 1913.

Following the war, he continued to advocate permanent nationalization of telephone, telegraph, and cable services. He acknowledged that Congress would be hostile to the idea, and he oversaw the return of the communications infrastructure to its various corporate owners. He introduced the "zone system" in which postage on second-class mail was charged according to distance.

== Later life ==
In 1919, he was appointed as chairman of the United States Telegraph and Telephone Administration. In 1920, he became the chairman of the United States Commission to the International Wire Communication Conference and retired in 1921.

In the 1930s, he opposed the Ku Klux Klan and supported Al Smith for president. Burleson died of a heart attack and is buried in the Oakwood Cemetery, in Austin, Texas.

Political offices
Preceded by Frank H. Hitchcock	United States Postmaster General; Served under: Woodrow Wilson; 1913–1921	Succeeded by Will H. Hays
U.S. House of Representatives
Preceded by Joseph D. Sayers	Member of the U.S. House of Representatives from Texas's 9th congressional district 1899–1903	Succeeded by George Farmer Burgess
Preceded by George Farmer Burgess	Member of the U.S. House of Representatives from Texas's 10th congressional district 1903–1913	Succeeded by James P. Buchanan
