= 1916 United States Senate election in Texas =

- November 7, 1916
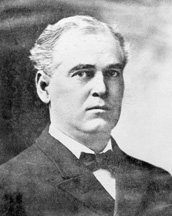

Nominee	Charles Culberson	Alex W. Atcheson	Thomas A. Hickey
Party	Democratic	Republican	Socialist
Popular vote	303,035	48,788	18,616
Percentage	81.30%	13.09%	4.99%
- County results Culberson: 50–60% 60–70% 70–80% 80–90% >90% Atcheson: 40–50% 50–60% 60–70% 80–90% No votes
U.S. senator before election
Charles Culberson
Democratic
Elected U.S. Senator
Charles Culberson
Democratic

The 1916 United States Senate election in Texas was held on November 7, 1916. Incumbent Democratic U.S. Senator Charles Culberson was re-elected to a fourth term in office. Culberson survived a challenge from former Governor Oscar Colquitt in the Democratic primary, then easily won the general election. He was challenged by Republican Alex W. Atcheson and Socialist Thomas Hickey, publisher of The Rebel.

This was the first US Senate election in Texas held after the passage of the Seventeenth Amendment, which required all Senators be elected by a direct popular vote. Culberson's runoff performance was the largest for a second-place finisher in a US Senate primary in Texas until Ken Paxton's performance in 2026.

== Democratic primary ==
=== Candidates ===
- Samuel Palmer Brooks, president of Baylor University and the Texas Baptist General Convention
- Thomas Mitchell Campbell, former Governor of Texas (1907–11)
- Oscar Branch Colquitt, former Governor of Texas (1911–15)
- Charles Allen Culberson, incumbent U.S. Senator since 1899
- John Davis
- Robert Lee Henry, U.S. Representative from Waco
- G. W. Riddle

=== Results ===
1916 Democratic U.S. Senate primary
Party	Candidate	Votes	%
Democratic	Oscar Branch Colquitt	119,598	29.95%
Democratic	Charles Allen Culberson (incumbent)	87,421	21.89%
Democratic	Samuel Palmer Brooks	78,641	19.69%
Democratic	Thomas Mitchell Campbell	65,721	16.46%
Democratic	Robert Lee Henry	37,725	9.45%
Democratic	John Davis	9,924	2.49%
Democratic	G. W. Riddle	335	0.08%
Total votes		399,366	100.00%

=== Runoff ===
1916 Democratic U.S. Senate runoff
Party	Candidate	Votes	%
Democratic	Charles Allen Culberson (incumbent)	163,182	63.43%
Democratic	Oscar Branch Colquitt	94,098	36.57%
Total votes		257,280	100.00%

== General election ==
=== Results ===
1916 United States Senate election in Texas
Party	Candidate	Votes	%
Democratic	Charles Allen Culberson (incumbent)	303,035	81.30%
Republican	Alex W. Atcheson	48,788	13.09%
Socialist	Thomas A. Hickey	18,616	4.99%
Prohibition	Edward H. Conibear	2,319	0.62%
Total votes		372,758	100.00%
Democratic hold			

== See also ==
- 1916 United States Senate elections
