= Ray Roberts (politician) =

American politician (1913–1992)

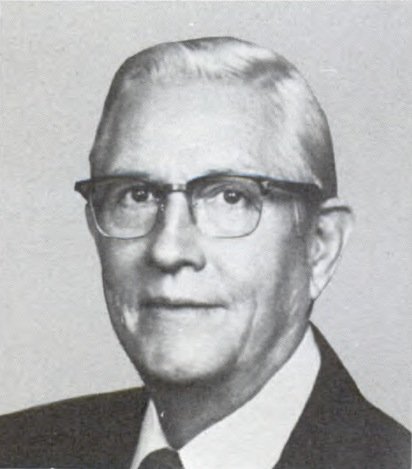

Chair of the House Veterans' Affairs Committee
- In office January 3, 1975 – January 3, 1981
- Speaker: Carl Albert; Tip O'Neill
- Preceded by: William Jennings Bryan Dorn
- Succeeded by: Sonny Montgomery

Member of the U.S. House of Representatives from Texas's 4th district
- In office January 30, 1962 – January 3, 1981
- Preceded by: Sam Rayburn
- Succeeded by: Ralph Hall

Member of the Texas Senate from the 9th district
- In office 1955–1962
- Preceded by: Joe Russell
- Succeeded by: Ralph Hall

Personal details
- Born: Herbert Ray Roberts; March 28, 1913 Collin County, Texas, U.S.
- Died: April 13, 1992 (aged 79) Denton, Texas, U.S.
- Party: Democratic
- Education: Texas A&M University; North Texas State University; University of Texas

Herbert Ray Roberts (March 28, 1913 – April 13, 1992) was an American Democratic politician who represented Texas's 4th congressional district from 1962 to 1981.

== Early life and education ==
Roberts was born in rural Collin County, Texas in 1913. He grew up in the ranching town of Westminster, Texas, just outside McKinney.

Roberts graduated from McKinney High School. He attended Texas A&M University and North Texas State University (now the University of North Texas) before earning a bachelor's degree in agribusiness. Roberts earned his master's degree from the University of Texas. He served in the United States Navy from 1942 to 1945. He was the final individual off the USS Hornet when it sank at the Battle of the Santa Cruz Islands on 26 October 1942. Later, he saw active duty in the Korean War as a member of the U.S. Naval Reserve.

== Early career ==
Roberts was on the staff of Speaker of the House Sam Rayburn of Texas, working in Washington, D.C., between 1941 and 1942 before going on active duty in World War II. After the war, he worked as a farmer and entered into agribusiness. He was a member of the Texas State Senate from 1955 to 1961, serving as the president pro tempore of the body in 1961.

== U.S. House of Representatives ==
Roberts was elected as a Democrat to the Eighty-seventh Congress, by special election, to fill the vacancy caused by the death of Sam Rayburn. He was re-elected to the nine succeeding Congresses, serving from January 30, 1962, to January 3, 1981.

On November 22, 1963, Roberts was in the Dallas motorcade when President John F. Kennedy was assassinated. He was riding in the same car as the Dallas Mayor Earl Cabell, and the mayor's wife. Their car was four cars behind the limousine carrying JFK. The family of Ray Roberts can confirm that the Warren Commission or any other of its investigation personnel never asked Roberts a single question about the shooting. When Mrs. Cabell testified to the Warren Commission, she stated that shortly after the shots ended Roberts first said, "That is a .30-06." (with Roberts meaning the shot(s) he could hear sounded like they were fired from a .30-06 type of rifle) and that Roberts had told her that he had also smelled the distinct odor of gun smoke (as did Mrs. Cabell and several other motorcade participants and witnesses who were all located down at street level, which was up-wind from the Texas School Book Depository, and 61' to 82' below and varying distances away from its sixth floor)

Roberts was chair of the Committee on Veterans’ Affairs from 1975 through 1981. He did not run for re-election in 1980.

== Other ==
Lake Ray Roberts is named after the Congressman.

His official documents from his years in office both in the Texas State Senate as well as the U.S. House of Representatives can be found in the archives at Texas A&M-Commerce, which used to be known as East Texas State University.

His only brother was Roy Geldon Roberts Sr. of Plano.

Texas Senate
Preceded by Joe Russell	Texas State Senator from District 9 (McKinney); 1955–1962	Succeeded by Ralph Hall
U.S. House of Representatives
Preceded by Sam Rayburn	Member of the U.S. House of Representatives from Texas's 4th congressional district 1962–1981	Succeeded by Ralph Hall
Political offices
Preceded by Bryan Dorn; South Carolina	Chairman of the House Veterans' Affairs Committee; 1975–1981	Succeeded by Sonny Montgomery; Mississippi
