= Bug Tussle, Texas =

Unincorporated community in Texas, US

- Unincorporated community
- Location within the state of Texas
- Coordinates: 33°29′01″N 95°56′37″W
- Country: United States
- State: Texas
- County: Fannin
- Elevation: 581 ft (177 m)

Population (1990)
  - Total: 15
- Time zone: UTC-6 (Central (CST))
  - Summer (DST): UTC-6 (CDT)
- GNIS feature ID: 1381548

Bug Tussle, formerly known as Truss, is an unincorporated community in southeastern Fannin County, Texas, United States.

== History ==
Bug Tussle is situated on the junction of Farm to Market Road 1550 and Texas State Highway 34. It was founded in the 1890s, and was called Truss, after resident John Truss. The post office was established in 1893 or 1894. In 1962, Bug Tussle had a population of six. From 1966 to the mid-1980s, real estate developer David Graham Hall took a 15-year lease to renovate the downtown. Thirty people lived in the downtown, called 'West Bug Tussle' after its completion. In 1990, the population was 15.

=== Name ===
Bug Tussle has been noted for its unusual place name. More than seventy Bug Tussle highway signs have been stolen.

The most accepted origin to Bug Tussle's name was from an incident in the 1890s when a swarm of insects spoiled an ice cream social. Another possible origin of the name comes from picnickers, who watched bugs fight after eating. Another possible origin comes from two residents who wanted to change the name. During an argument, the town got distracted by the sight of two dung beetles fighting.
