= Texas's 11th congressional district =

U.S. House district for Texas

Coordinates: 31°43′56″N 100°03′49″W

- Interactive map of district boundaries
- Representative: August Pfluger; R–San Angelo
- Distribution: 71.66% urban; 28.34% rural
- Population (2025): 810,938
- Median household income: $78,592
- Ethnicity: 43.7% White; 38.6% Hispanic; 10.8% Black; 3.7% Two or more races; 2.0% Asian; 1.2% other
- Cook PVI: R+22

Texas's 11th congressional district of the United States House of Representatives is in the midwestern portion of the state of Texas, stretching from the Permian Basin through the Hill Country. Major cities in the district include: Andrews, Midland, Odessa, San Angelo, Killeen, and Brownwood. The current Representative from the 11th district is Republican August Pfluger.

Texas has had at least 11 districts since 1883. The current configuration dates from the 2003 Texas redistricting; its first congressman, Mike Conaway, took office in 2005. It is one of the most Republican districts in the nation. Much of the territory now in the district began shaking off its Democratic roots far sooner than the rest of Texas. For instance, Barry Goldwater did very well in much of this area in 1964, and Midland itself last supported a Democrat for president in 1948. While Democrats continued to hold most local offices here well into the 1980s and continued to represent parts of the region through the 1990s, today Republicans dominate every level of government, usually winning by well over 70 percent of the vote. There are almost no elected Democrats left above the county level.

It was President George W. Bush's strongest district in the entire nation in the 2004 election. Since its creation, the Republicans have never dropped below 75 percent of the vote. The Democrats have only put up a candidate five times, only one of whom has even won 20 percent of the vote.

Conaway retired at the end of his eighth term in 2021. Pfluger won the Republican primary to succeed him. With Republicans having a nearly 10-to-1 advantage in registration, he was all but assured of victory in the general election.

From 1903-2005 the district was based in central Texas and contained Waco.

As part of the 2025 partisan redistricting, the 2026 election will now include parts of suburban Austin, Cedar Park Leander and Pflugerville while removing the parts of the district that stretched to Killeen.

== Current composition ==
For the 118th and successive Congresses (based on redistricting following the 2020 census), the district contains all or portions of the following counties and communities:

Bell County (2)

Fort Cavazos (part; also 11th), Killeen (part; also 31st)

Brown County (8)

All 8 communities

Coke County (3)

All 3 communities

Coleman County (4)

All 4 communities

Concho County (2)

Eden, Paint Rock

Ector County (4)

All 4 communities

Glasscock County (1)

Garden City

Irion County (1)

Mertzon

Kimble County (1)

Junction

Lampasas County (4)

All 4 communities

Llano County (7)

All 7 communities

Mason County (1)

Mason

McCulloch County (3)

All 3 communities

Menard County (1)

Menard

Midland County (2)

Midland (part; also 19th; shared with Martin County), Odessa (shared with Ector County)

Mills County (3)

All 3 communities

Runnels County (5)

All 5 communities

San Saba County (2)

Richland Springs, San Saba

Sterling County (1)

Sterling City

Tom Green County (4)

All 4 communities

== Future composition ==
Beginning with the 2026 election, the 11th district will consist of the following counties:

- Brown
- Burnet (part)
- Coke
- Coleman
- Concho
- Ector
- Glasscock
- Irion
- Kimble
- Llano
- Mason
- McCulloch
- Menard
- Midland
- Runnels
- San Saba
- Sterling
- Tom Green
- Travis (part)
- Williamson (part)

== List of members representing the district ==
Member	Party	Term	Cong ress	Electoral history	District location
District established March 4, 1883
Samuel W. T. Lanham (Weatherford)	Democratic	March 4, 1883 – March 3, 1893	48th 49th 50th 51st 52nd	Elected in 1882. Re-elected in 1884. Re-elected in 1886. Re-elected in 1888. Re-elected in 1890. Retired.	[data missing]
William H. Crain (Cuero)	Democratic	March 4, 1893 – February 10, 1896	53rd 54th	Redistricted from the 7th district and re-elected in 1892. Re-elected in 1894. Died.	[data missing]
Vacant		February 10, 1896 – April 7, 1896	54th		[data missing]
Rudolph Kleberg (Cuero)	Democratic	April 7, 1896 – March 3, 1903	54th 55th 56th 57th	Elected to finish Crain's term. Re-elected in 1896; Re-elected in 1898. Re-elected in 1900. Retired.	[data missing]
Robert L. Henry (Waco)	Democratic	March 4, 1903 – March 3, 1917	58th 59th 60th 61st 62nd 63rd 64th	Redistricted from the 7th district and re-elected in 1902. Re-elected in 1904. Re-elected in 1906. Re-elected in 1908. Re-elected in 1910. Re-elected in 1912. Re-elected in 1914. Retired to run for U.S. senator.	[data missing]
Tom Connally (Marlin)	Democratic	March 4, 1917 – March 3, 1929	65th 66th 67th 68th 69th 70th	Elected in 1916. Re-elected in 1918. Re-elected in 1920. Re-elected in 1922. Re-elected in 1924. Re-elected in 1926. Retired to run for U.S. senator.	[data missing]
Oliver H. Cross (Waco)	Democratic	March 4, 1929 – January 3, 1937	71st 72nd 73rd 74th	Elected in 1928. Re-elected in 1930. Re-elected in 1932. Re-elected in 1934. Retired.	[data missing]
William R. Poage (Waco)	Democratic	January 3, 1937 – December 31, 1978	75th 76th 77th 78th 79th 80th 81st 82nd 83rd 84th 85th 86th 87th 88th 89th 90th 91st 92nd 93rd 94th 95th	Elected in 1936. Re-elected in 1938. Re-elected in 1940. Re-elected in 1942. Re-elected in 1944. Re-elected in 1946. Re-elected in 1948. Re-elected in 1950. Re-elected in 1952. Re-elected in 1954. Re-elected in 1956. Re-elected in 1958. Re-elected in 1960. Re-elected in 1962. Re-elected in 1964. Re-elected in 1966. Re-elected in 1968. Re-elected in 1970. Re-elected in 1972. Re-elected in 1974. Re-elected in 1976. Retired and then resigned.	[data missing]
Vacant		December 31, 1978 – January 3, 1979	95th		[data missing]
Marvin Leath (Waco)	Democratic	January 3, 1979 – January 3, 1991	96th 97th 98th 99th 100th 101st	Elected in 1978. Re-elected in 1980. Re-elected in 1982. Re-elected in 1984. Re-elected in 1986. Re-elected in 1988. Retired.	[data missing]
Chet Edwards (Waco)	Democratic	January 3, 1991 – January 3, 2005	102nd 103rd 104th 105th 106th 107th 108th	Elected in 1990. Re-elected in 1992. Re-elected in 1994. Re-elected in 1996. Re-elected in 1998. Re-elected in 2000. Re-elected in 2002. Redistricted to the 17th district.	[data missing]
Mike Conaway (Midland)	Republican	January 3, 2005 – January 3, 2021	109th 110th 111th 112th 113th 114th 115th 116th	Elected in 2004. Re-elected in 2006. Re-elected in 2008. Re-elected in 2010. Re-elected in 2012. Re-elected in 2014. Re-elected in 2016. Re-elected in 2018. Retired.	2005-2013
Mike Conaway (Midland)	Republican	January 3, 2005 – January 3, 2021	109th 110th 111th 112th 113th 114th 115th 116th	Elected in 2004. Re-elected in 2006. Re-elected in 2008. Re-elected in 2010. Re-elected in 2012. Re-elected in 2014. Re-elected in 2016. Re-elected in 2018. Retired.	2013–2023 Andrews, Brown, Callahan, Coke, Coleman, Comanche, Concho, Dawson, Eastland, Ector, Erath (part), Glasscock, Hood, Irion, Kimble, Llano, Martin, Mason, McCulloch, Menard, Midland, Mills, Mitchell, Palo Pinto, Runnels, San Saba, Stephens (part), Sterling, Tom Green
August Pfluger (San Angelo)	Republican	January 3, 2021 – present	117th 118th 119th	Elected in 2020. Re-elected in 2022. Re-elected in 2024. Re-elected in 2026.	2013–2023 Andrews, Brown, Callahan, Coke, Coleman, Comanche, Concho, Dawson, Eastland, Ector, Erath (part), Glasscock, Hood, Irion, Kimble, Llano, Martin, Mason, McCulloch, Menard, Midland, Mills, Mitchell, Palo Pinto, Runnels, San Saba, Stephens (part), Sterling, Tom Green
August Pfluger (San Angelo)	Republican	January 3, 2021 – present	117th 118th 119th	Elected in 2020. Re-elected in 2022. Re-elected in 2024. Re-elected in 2026.	2023–2027 Bell (part), Brown, Coke, Coleman, Concho, Ector, Glasscock, Irion, Kimble, Lampasas, Llano, Mason, McCulloch, Menard, Midland, Mills, Runnels, San Saba, Sterling, Tom Green

== Recent election results from statewide races ==
=== 2023–2027 boundaries ===
Year	Office	Results
2008	President	McCain 69% - 30%
2012	President	Romney 73% - 27%
2014	Senate	Cornyn 81% - 19%
2014	Governor	Abbott 79% - 21%
2016	President	Trump 69% - 27%
2018	Senate	Cruz 69% - 30%
2018	Governor	Abbott 72% - 26%
2018	Lt. Governor	Patrick 68% - 30%
2018	Attorney General	Paxton 68% - 29%
2018	Comptroller of Public Accounts	Hegar 70% - 27%
2020	President	Trump 69% - 29%
2020	Senate	Cornyn 70% - 28%
2022	Governor	Abbott 74% - 25%
2022	Lt. Governor	Patrick 72% - 25%
2022	Attorney General	Paxton 72% - 25%
2022	Comptroller of Public Accounts	Hegar 74% - 24%
2024	President	Trump 72% - 27%
2024	Senate	Cruz 70% - 28%

=== 2027–2033 boundaries ===
Year	Office	Results
2008	President	McCain 68% - 31%
2012	President	Romney 72% - 28%
2014	Senate	Cornyn 77% - 23%
2014	Governor	Abbott 74% - 26%
2016	President	Trump 65% - 30%
2018	Senate	Cruz 63% - 36%
2018	Governor	Abbott 67% - 31%
2018	Lt. Governor	Patrick 62% - 35%
2018	Attorney General	Paxton 63% - 35%
2018	Comptroller of Public Accounts	Hegar 65% - 31%
2020	President	Trump 64% - 34%
2020	Senate	Cornyn 65% - 32%
2022	Governor	Abbott 66% - 33%
2022	Lt. Governor	Patrick 65% - 33%
2022	Attorney General	Paxton 64% - 33%
2022	Comptroller of Public Accounts	Hegar 67% - 31%
2024	President	Trump 66% - 32%
2024	Senate	Cruz 64% - 34%
2026	Senate	Paxton 53% - 43%
2026	Governor	Abbott 56% - 42%

== Recent election results ==
2024 United States House of Representatives elections in Texas: Texas District 11
Party	Candidate	Votes	%
Republican	August Pfluger (incumbent)	211,975	100.0
Total votes		211,975	100.0

2022 United States House of Representatives elections in Texas: Texas District 11
Party	Candidate	Votes	%
Republican	August Pfluger (incumbent)	151,066	100.0
Total votes		151,066	100.0

2020 United States House of Representatives elections in Texas: Texas District 11
Party	Candidate	Votes	%	±%
Republican	August Pfluger	231,781	79.71	−0.43
Democratic	Jon Hogg	53,198	18.30	−0.14
Libertarian	Wacey Cody	5,784	1.99	+0.56
Majority		178,583	61.41	−0.29
Turnout		290,763		
Republican hold		Swing		

US House election, 2018: Texas District 11
Party	Candidate	Votes	%	±%
Republican	Mike Conaway (incumbent)	176,603	80.14	−9.36
Democratic	Jennie Leeder	40,631	18.44	+18.44
Libertarian	Rhett Smith	3,143	1.43	−9.07
Majority		135,972	61.70	−17.30
Turnout		220,377		
Republican hold		Swing		

US House election, 2016: Texas District 11
Party	Candidate	Votes	%	±%
Republican	Mike Conaway (incumbent)	201,871	89.50	−0.77
Libertarian	Nicholas Landholt	23,677	10.50	+0.77
Majority		178,194	79.00	−1.54
Turnout		225,548		
Republican hold		Swing		

US House election, 2014: Texas District 11
Party	Candidate	Votes	%	±%
Republican	Mike Conaway (incumbent)	107,939	90.27	+11.63
Libertarian	Ryan Lange	11,635	9.73	+6.94
Majority		96,304	80.54	+20.47
Turnout		119,574		
Republican hold		Swing		

US House election, 2012: Texas District 11
Party	Candidate	Votes	%	±%
Republican	Mike Conaway (incumbent)	177,742	78.64	−2.20
Democratic	Jim Riley	41,970	18.57	+3.13
Libertarian	Scott Ballard	6,311	2.79	+0.01
Majority		135,772	60.07	−5.33
Turnout		226,023		
Republican hold		Swing		

US House election, 2010: Texas District 11
Party	Candidate	Votes	%	±%
Republican	Mike Conaway (incumbent)	125,581	80.84	−7.49
Democratic	James Quillian	23,989	15.44	+3.77
Libertarian	James Powell	4,321	2.78	+2.78
Green	Jim Howe	1,449	0.93	+0.93
Majority		101,592	65.40	−11.26
Turnout		155,340		
Republican hold		Swing		

US House election, 2008: Texas District 11
Party	Candidate	Votes	%	±%
Republican	Mike Conaway (incumbent)	189,625	88.33	−11.67
Libertarian	John Strohm	25,051	11.67	+11.67
Majority		164,574	76.66	−23.34
Turnout		214,676		
Republican hold		Swing		

US House election, 2006: Texas District 11
Party	Candidate	Votes	%	±%
Republican	Mike Conaway (incumbent)	107,268	100.00	+23.24
Majority		107,268	100.00	+45.03
Turnout		107,268		
Republican hold		Swing		

2004 United States House of Representatives elections in Texas: District 11
Party	Candidate	Votes	%	±%
Republican	Mike Conaway	177,291	76.8%	+29.7%
Democratic	Wayne Raasch	50,339	21.8%	−29.8%
Libertarian	Jeffrey Blunt	3,347	1.4%	+0.1%
Majority		126,952	55.0%	
Turnout		230,977		
Republican gain from Democratic		Swing	+29.7%	

== Historical district boundaries ==
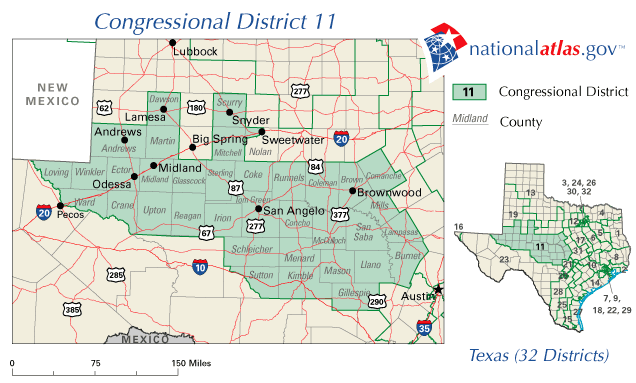
2007–2013

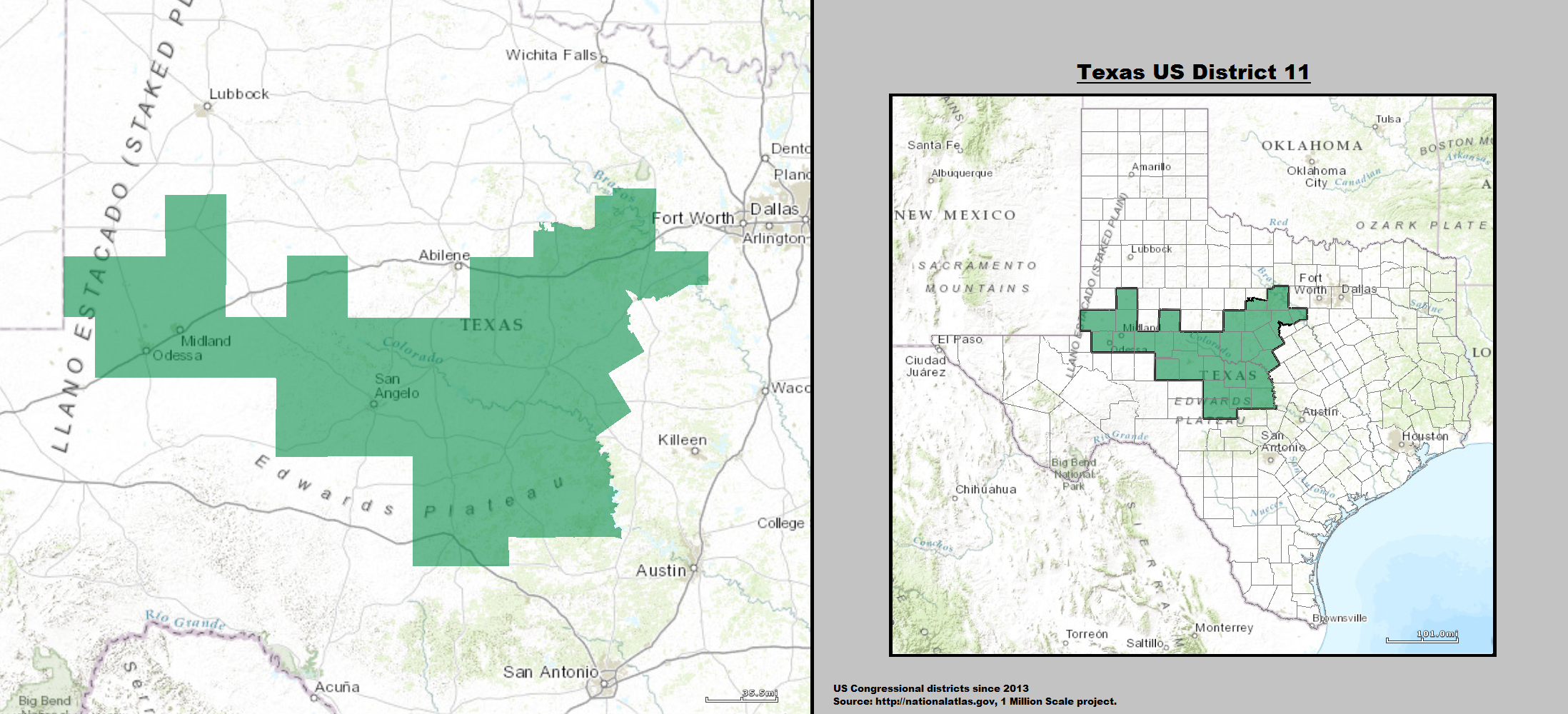
2013–2023

== See also ==
- List of United States congressional districts
