= 2004 United States House of Representatives elections in Texas =

- November 2, 2004

All 32 Texas seats to the United States House of Representatives
	Majority party	Minority party
Party	Republican	Democratic
Last election	15	17
Seats before	16	16
Seats won	21	11
Seat change	▲5	▼5
Popular vote	4,012,534	2,713,968
Percentage	57.66%	39.00%
Swing	▲4.3%	▼4.9%
Republican
50–60%
60–70%
70–80%
80–90%
90>%
Democratic
50–60%
60–70%
70–80%
80–90%
90>%

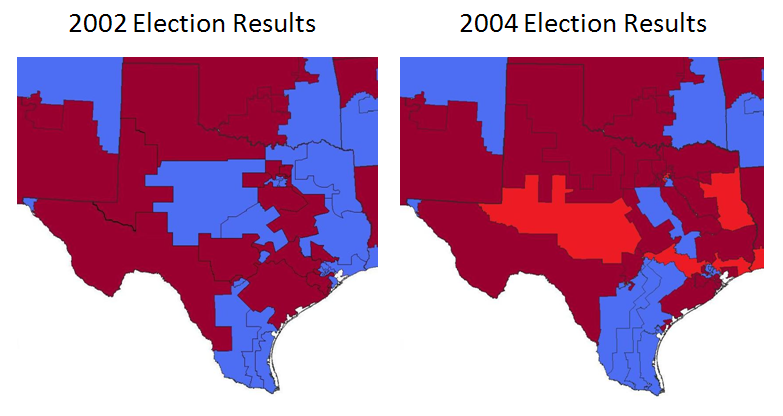
Comparison of U.S. House election results for Texas in 2002 and 2004 after the creation of new boundaries for congressional districts following mid-term redistricting in 2003. Blue denotes a Democratic hold, dark red denotes a Republican hold, and light red denotes a Republican pickup.

The 2004 United States House of Representatives elections in Texas occurred on November 2, 2004, to elect the members of the state of Texas's delegation to the United States House of Representatives. Texas had thirty-two seats in the House, apportioned according to the 2000 United States census.

These elections occurred simultaneously with the United States Senate elections of 2004, the United States House elections in other states, and various state and local elections.

Republicans gained a majority of the congressional seats for the first time since 1870. They gained five of Texas's House seats due to a midterm redistricting in 2003. However some of the districts created following this election would later be changed. The Twenty-third district would be declared an unconstitutional racially gerrymandered district by the Supreme Court in League of United Latin American Citizens v. Perry in 2006. Thus it and neighboring districts would be redrawn.

== Overview ==
2004 United States House of Representatives elections in Texas
Party	Votes	Percentage	Seats before	Seats after	+/–
Republican	4,012,534	57.66%	16	21	+5
Democratic	2,713,968	39.00%	16	11	-5
Libertarian	180,389	2.59%	0	0	0
Independent	51,712	0.74%	0	0	0
Totals	6,958,603	100.00%	32	32	—

== District 1 ==
2004 Texas's 1st congressional district election
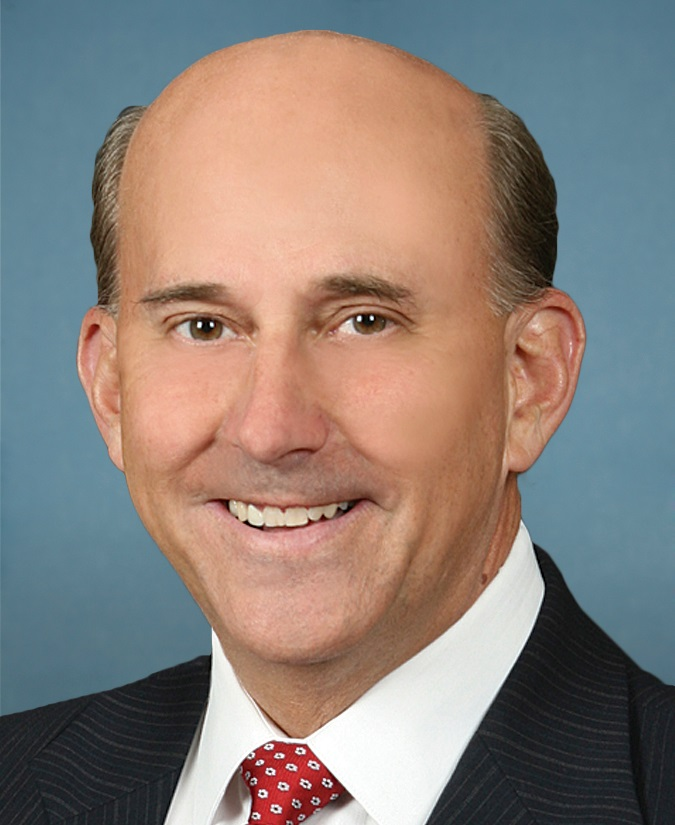

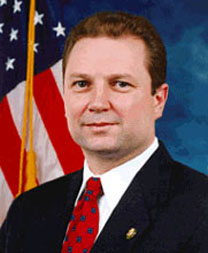
Nominee	Louie Gohmert	Max Sandlin
Party	Republican	Democratic
Popular vote	157,068	96,281
Percentage	61.5%	37.7%
- County results Gohmert: 50–60% 60–70% Sandlin: 50–60%
U.S. Representative before election
Max Sandlin
Democratic
Elected U.S. Representative
Louis Gohmert
Republican

Incumbent Democrat Max Sandlin ran for re-election, but was defeated by Republican Louie Gohmert.

=== Predictions ===
Source	Ranking	As of
The Cook Political Report	Tossup	October 29, 2004
Sabato's Crystal Ball	Lean R (flip)	November 1, 2004

=== Results ===
Texas's 1st congressional district, 2004
Party	Candidate	Votes	%
Republican	Louie Gohmert	157,068	61.47
Democratic	Max Sandlin (incumbent)	96,281	37.68
Libertarian	Dean Tucker	2,158	0.84
Total votes		255,507	100.00
Republican gain from Democratic			

== District 2 ==
2004 Texas's 2nd congressional district election
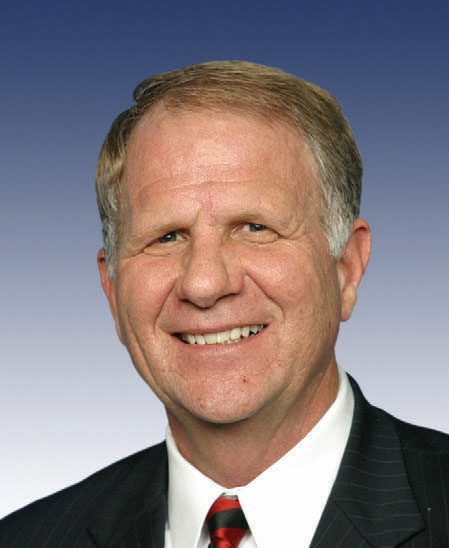

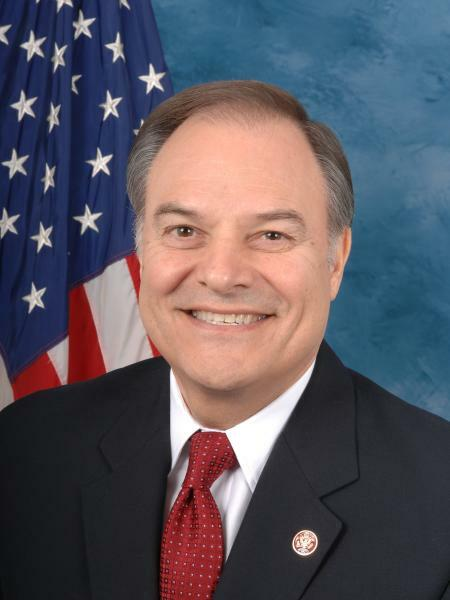
Nominee	Ted Poe	Nick Lampson
Party	Republican	Democratic
Popular vote	139,951	108,156
Percentage	55.5%	42.9%
- County results Poe: 50–60% 70–80% Lampson: 60–70%
U.S. Representative before election
Nick Lampson
Democratic
Elected U.S. Representative
Ted Poe
Republican

Incumbent Democrat Jim Turner opted to retire rather than run for re-election. Democratic representative Nick Lampson was redistricted from the neighboring 9th District and ran for re-election here.

=== Predictions ===
Source	Ranking	As of
The Cook Political Report	Tossup	October 29, 2004
Sabato's Crystal Ball	Lean R (flip)	November 1, 2004

=== Results ===
Texas's 2nd congressional district, 2004
Party	Candidate	Votes	%
Republican	Ted Poe	139,951	55.53
Democratic	Nick Lampson (incumbent)	108,156	42.91
Libertarian	Sandra Leigh Saulsbury	3,931	1.56
Total votes		252,038	100.00
Republican gain from Democratic			

== District 3 ==
2004 Texas's 3rd congressional district election
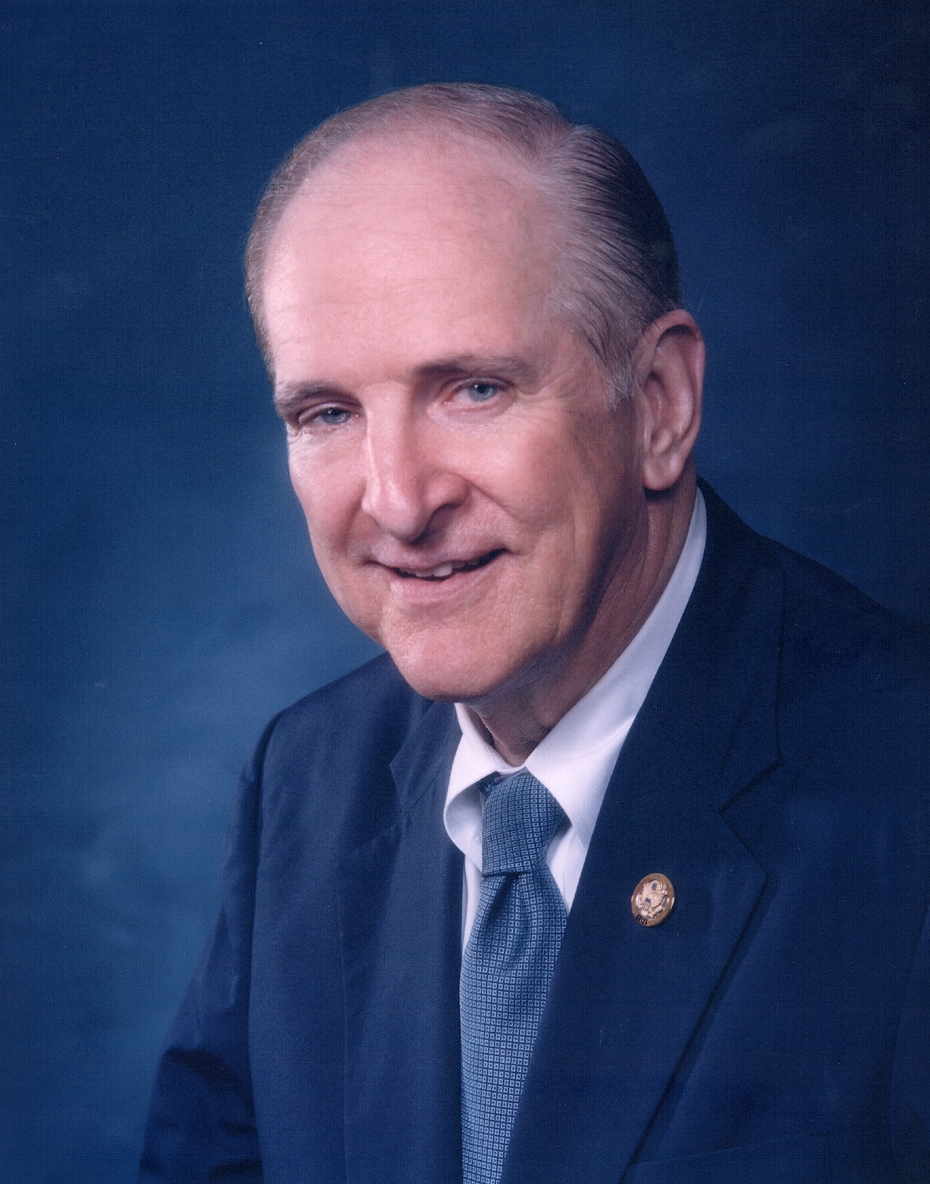

Nominee	Sam Johnson	Paul Jenkins	James Vessels
Party	Republican	Independent	Libertarian
Popular vote	180,099	16,966	13,287
Percentage	85.6%	8.1%	6.3%
- County results Johnson: 80–90%
U.S. Representative before election
Sam Johnson
Republican
Elected U.S. Representative
Sam Johnson
Republican

Incumbent Republican Sam Johnson ran for re-election.

=== Predictions ===
Source	Ranking	As of
The Cook Political Report	Safe R	October 29, 2004
Sabato's Crystal Ball	Safe R	November 1, 2004

=== Results ===
Texas's 3rd congressional district, 2004
Party	Candidate	Votes	%
Republican	Sam Johnson (incumbent)	180,099	85.62
Independent	Paul Jenkins	16,966	8.07
Libertarian	James Vessels	13,287	6.32
Total votes		210,352	100
Republican hold			

== District 4 ==
2004 Texas's 4th congressional district election
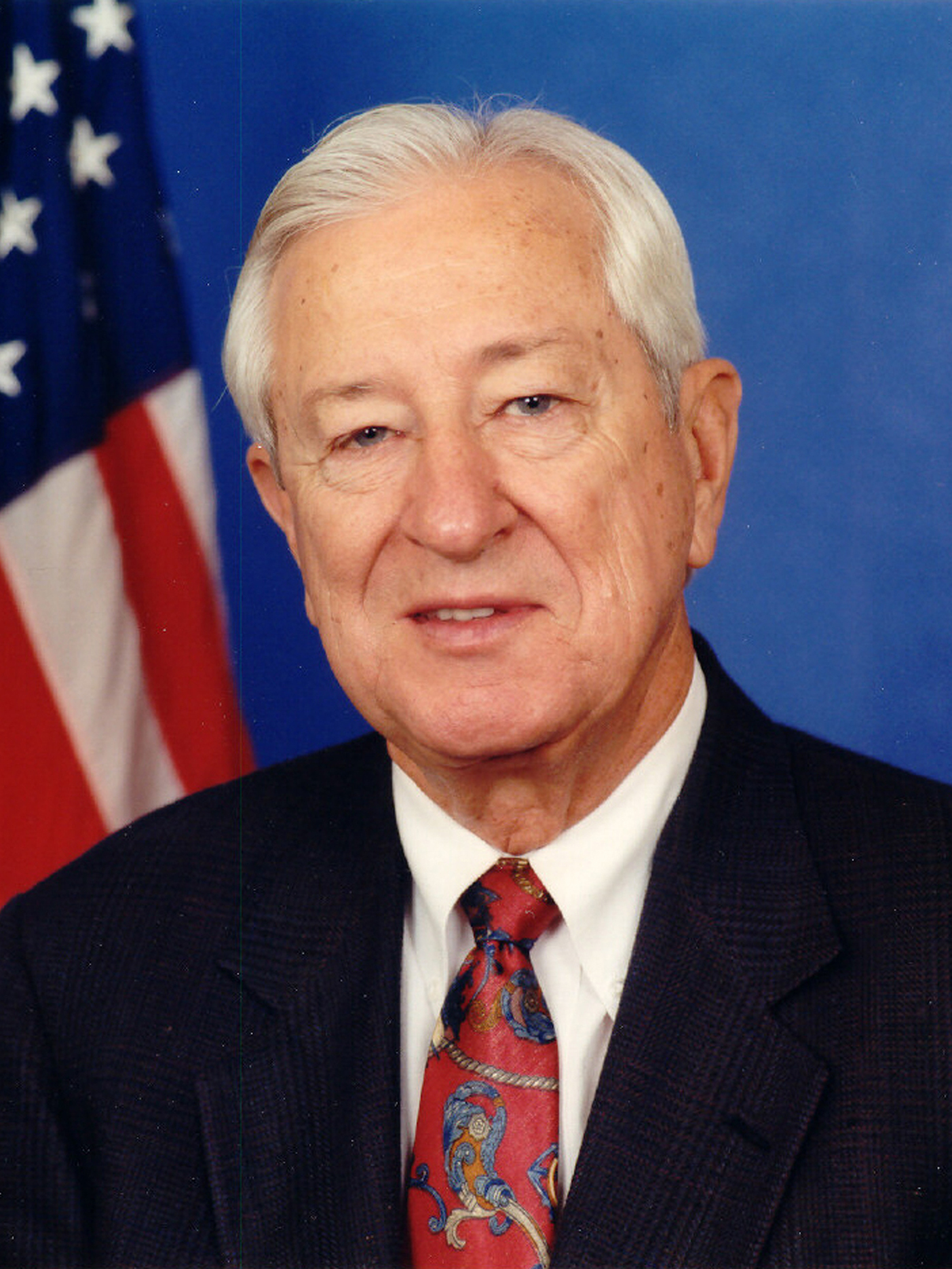

Nominee	Ralph Hall	Jim Nickerson
Party	Republican	Democratic
Popular vote	182,866	81,585
Percentage	68.3%	30.4%
- County results Hall: 50–60% 60–70% 70–80% 80–90% Nickerson: 50–60%
U.S. Representative before election
Ralph Hall
Republican
Elected U.S. Representative
Ralph Hall
Republican

Incumbent Democrat Ralph Hall switched his party affiliation to the Republican Party on January 3, 2004. He ran for re-election.

=== Predictions ===
Source	Ranking	As of
The Cook Political Report	Safe R	October 29, 2004
Sabato's Crystal Ball	Safe R	November 1, 2004

=== Results ===
Texas's 4th congressional district, 2004
Party	Candidate	Votes	%
Republican	Ralph Hall (incumbent)	182,866	68.25
Democratic	Jim Nickerson	81,585	30.45
Libertarian	Kevin Anderson	3,491	1.30
Total votes		267,942	100
Republican hold			

== District 5 ==
2004 Texas's 5th congressional district election
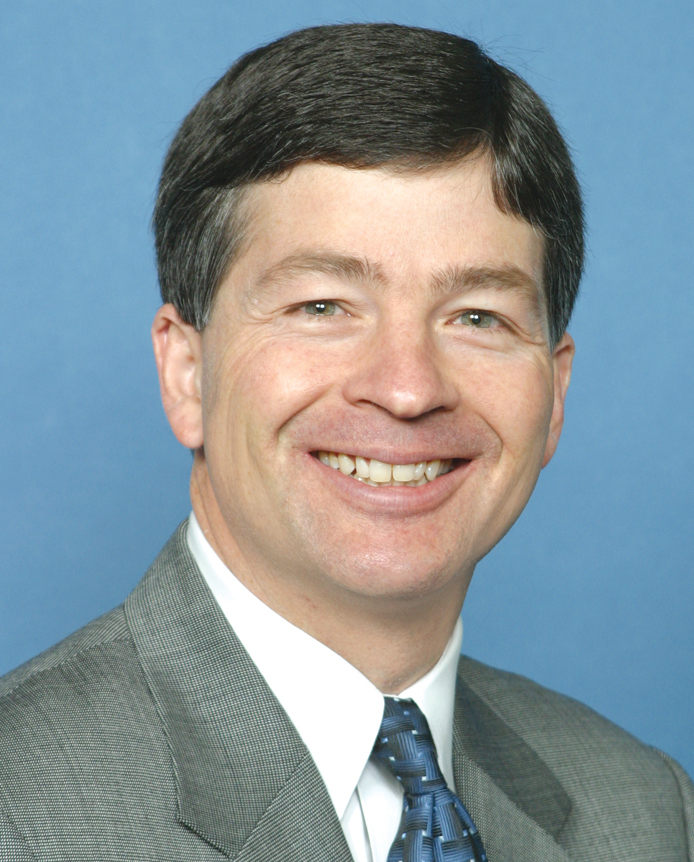

Nominee	Jeb Hensarling	Bill Bernstein
Party	Republican	Democratic
Popular vote	148,816	75,911
Percentage	64.5%	32.9%
- County results Hensarling: 60–70% 70–80%
U.S. Representative before election
Jeb Hensarling
Republican
Elected U.S. Representative
Jeb Hensarling
Republican

Incumbent Republican Jeb Hensarling ran for re-election.

=== Predictions ===
Source	Ranking	As of
The Cook Political Report	Safe R	October 29, 2004
Sabato's Crystal Ball	Safe R	November 1, 2004

=== Results ===
Texas's 5th congressional district, 2004
Party	Candidate	Votes	%
Republican	Jeb Hensarling (incumbent)	148,816	64.47
Democratic	Bill Bernstein	75,911	32.88
Libertarian	John Gonzalez	6,118	2.65
Total votes		230,845	100
Republican hold			

== District 6 ==
2004 Texas's 6th congressional district election
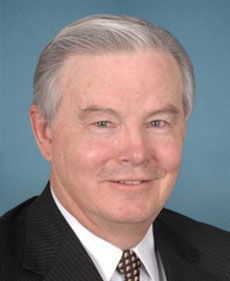

Nominee	Joe Barton	Morris Meyer
Party	Republican	Democratic
Popular vote	168,767	83,609
Percentage	66.0%	32.7%
- County results Barton: 50–60% 60–70% 70–80%
U.S. Representative before election
Joe Barton
Republican
Elected U.S. Representative
Joe Barton
Republican

Incumbent Republican Joe Barton ran for re-election.

=== Predictions ===
Source	Ranking	As of
The Cook Political Report	Safe R	October 29, 2004
Sabato's Crystal Ball	Safe R	November 1, 2004

=== Results ===
Texas's 6th congressional district, 2004
Party	Candidate	Votes	%
Republican	Joe Barton (incumbent)	168,767	66.02
Democratic	Morris Meyer	83,609	32.71
Libertarian	Stephen Schrader	3,251	1.27
Total votes		255,627	100
Republican hold			

== District 7 ==
2004 Texas's 7th congressional district election
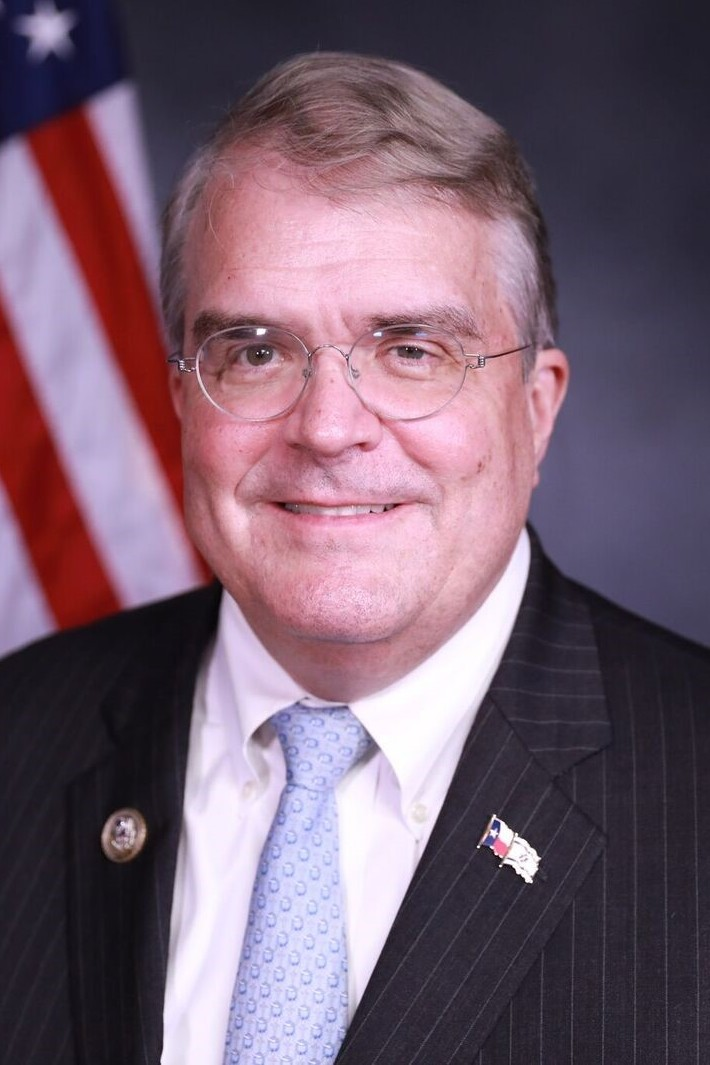

Nominee	John Culberson	John Martinez
Party	Republican	Democratic
Popular vote	175,440	91,126
Percentage	64.1%	33.3%
- County results Culberson: 60–70%
U.S. Representative before election
John Culberson
Republican
Elected U.S. Representative
John Culberson
Republican

Incumbent Republican John Culberson ran for re-election.

=== Predictions ===
Source	Ranking	As of
The Cook Political Report	Safe R	October 29, 2004
Sabato's Crystal Ball	Safe R	November 1, 2004

=== Results ===
Texas's 7th congressional district, 2004
Party	Candidate	Votes	%
Republican	John Culberson (incumbent)	175,440	64.11
Democratic	John Martinez	91,126	33.30
Independent	Paul Staton	3,713	1.36
Libertarian	Drew Parks	3,372	1.23
Total votes		273,651	100
Republican hold			

== District 8 ==
2004 Texas's 8th congressional district election
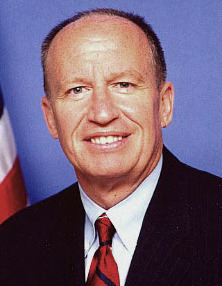

Nominee	Kevin Brady	Jim Wright
Party	Republican	Democratic
Popular vote	179,599	77,324
Percentage	68.9%	29.7%
- County results Brady: 50–60% 60–70% 70–80% Wright: 50–60%
U.S. Representative before election
Kevin Brady
Republican
Elected U.S. Representative
Kevin Brady
Republican

Incumbent Republican Kevin Brady ran for re-election.

=== Predictions ===
Source	Ranking	As of
The Cook Political Report	Safe R	October 29, 2004
Sabato's Crystal Ball	Safe R	November 1, 2004

=== Results ===
Texas's 8th congressional district, 2004
Party	Candidate	Votes	%
Republican	Kevin Brady (incumbent)	179,599	68.91
Democratic	Jim Wright	77,324	29.67
Libertarian	Paul Hansen	3,705	1.42
Total votes		260,628	100
Republican hold			

== District 9 ==
2004 Texas's 9th congressional district election
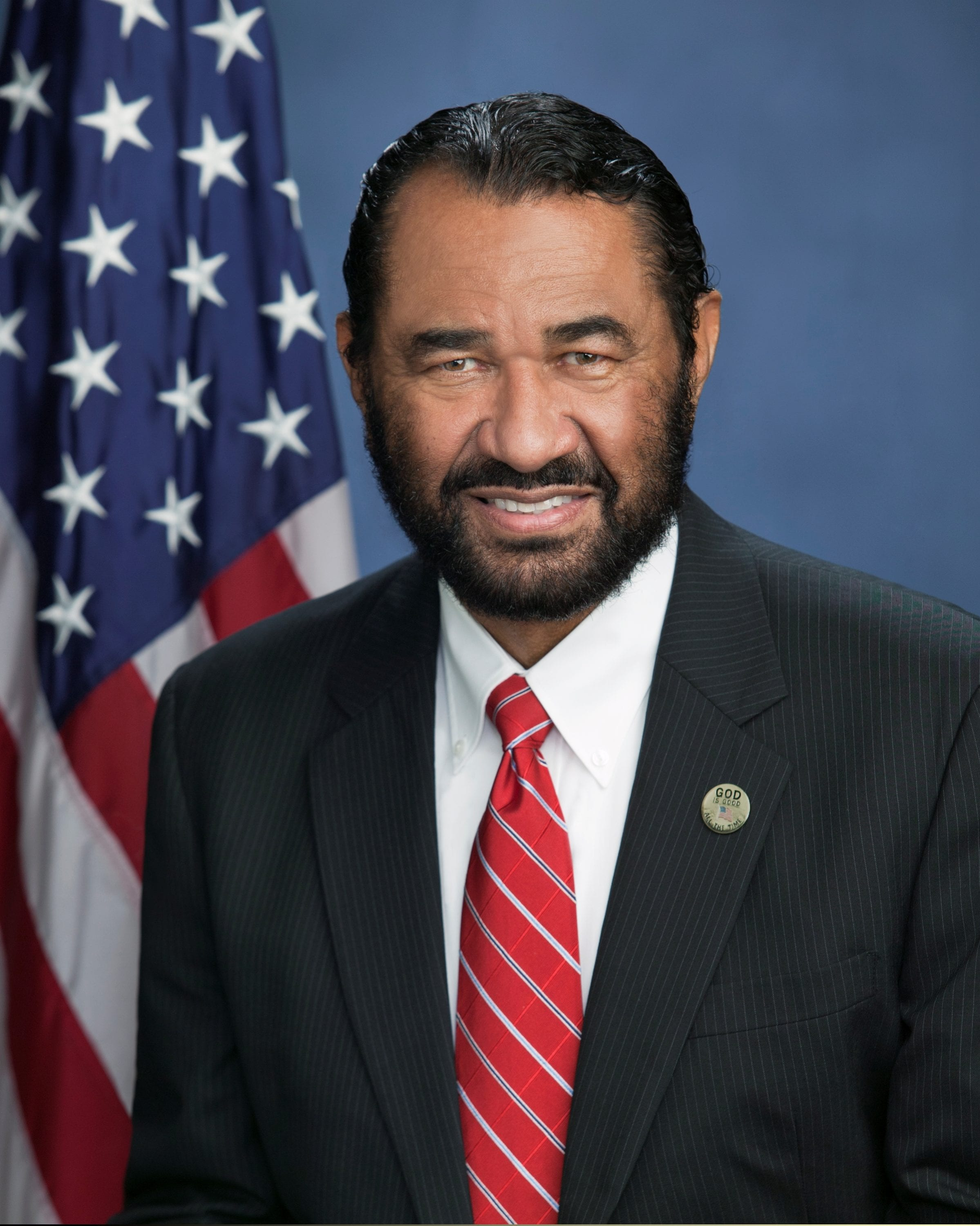

Nominee	Al Green	Arlette Molina
Party	Democratic	Republican
Popular vote	114,462	42,132
Percentage	72.2%	26.6%
- County results Green: 70–80%
U.S. Representative before election
Nick Lampson
Democratic
Elected U.S. Representative
Al Green
Democratic

Incumbent Democrat Nick Lampson was redistricted to the 2nd District. He ran for re-election there. Democratic representative Chris Bell was redistricted from the neighboring 25th District and also ran for re-election here, but he lost in the primary to Al Green.

=== Predictions ===
Source	Ranking	As of
The Cook Political Report	Safe D	October 29, 2004
Sabato's Crystal Ball	Safe D	November 1, 2004

=== Results ===
Texas's 9th congressional district, 2004
Party	Candidate	Votes	%
Democratic	Al Green	114,462	72.19
Republican	Arlette Molina	42,132	26.57
Libertarian	Stacey Bourland	1,972	1.24
Total votes		158,566	100
Democratic hold			

== District 10 ==
2004 Texas's 10th congressional district election
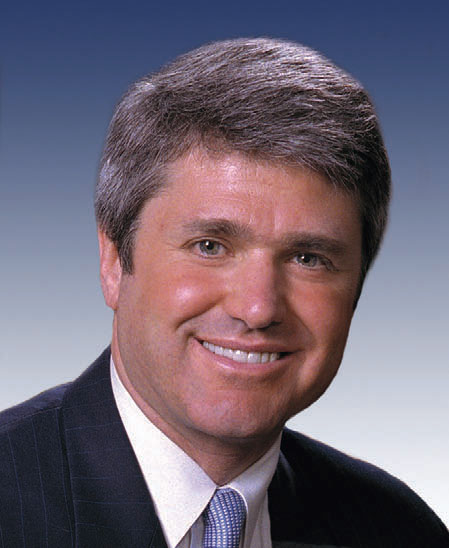

Nominee	Michael McCaul	Robert Fritsche
Party	Republican	Libertarian
Popular vote	182,113	35,569
Percentage	78.6%	15.4%
- County results Mccaul: 60–70% 70–80% 80–90% 90–100%
U.S. Representative before election
Lloyd Doggett
Democratic
Elected U.S. Representative
Michael McCaul
Republican

Incumbent Democrat Lloyd Doggett was redistricted to the 25th District. He ran for re-election there.

=== Predictions ===
Source	Ranking	As of
The Cook Political Report	Safe R (flip)	October 29, 2004
Sabato's Crystal Ball	Safe R (flip)	November 1, 2004

=== Results ===
Texas's 10th congressional district, 2004
Party	Candidate	Votes	%
Republican	Michael McCaul	182,113	78.62
Libertarian	Robert Fritsche	35,569	15.36
Write-in	Lorenzo Sadun	13,961	6.03
Total votes		231,643	100.00
Republican gain from Democratic			

== District 11 ==
2004 Texas's 11th congressional district election
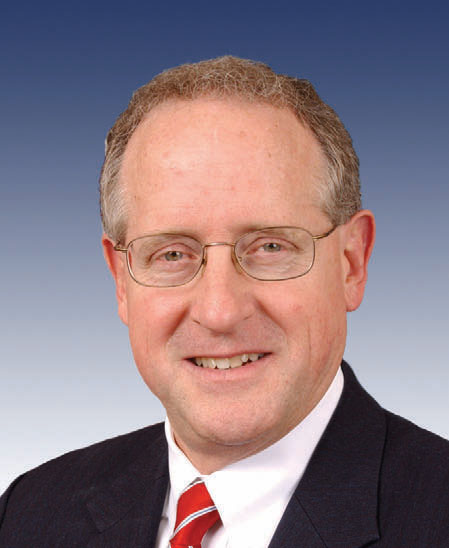

Nominee	Mike Conaway	Wayne Raasch
Party	Republican	Democratic
Popular vote	177,291	50,339
Percentage	76.8%	21.8%
- County results Conaway: 60–70% 70–80% 80–90% >90%
U.S. Representative before election
Chet Edwards
Democratic
Elected U.S. Representative
Mike Conaway
Republican

Incumbent Democrat Chet Edwards was redistricted to the 17th District. He ran for re-election there.

=== Predictions ===
Source	Ranking	As of
The Cook Political Report	Safe R (flip)	October 29, 2004
Sabato's Crystal Ball	Safe R (flip)	November 1, 2004

=== Results ===
Texas's 11th congressional district, 2004
Party	Candidate	Votes	%
Republican	Mike Conaway	177,291	76.76
Democratic	Wayne Raasch	50,339	21.79
Libertarian	Jeffrey Blunt	3,347	1.45
Total votes		230,977	100.00
Republican gain from Democratic			

== District 12 ==
2004 Texas's 12th congressional district election
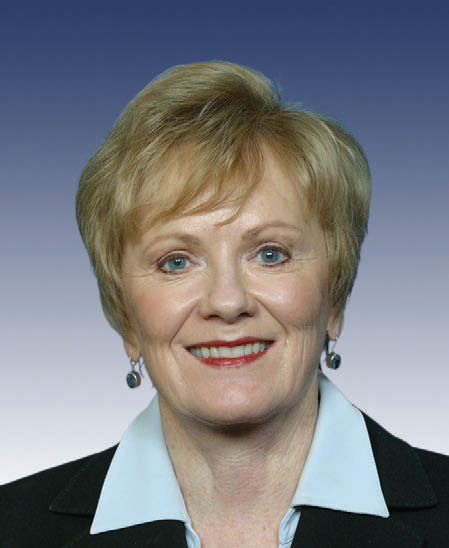

Nominee	Kay Granger	Felix Alvarado
Party	Republican	Democratic
Popular vote	173,222	66,316
Percentage	72.3%	27.7%
- County results Granger: 60–70% 70–80% 80–90%
U.S. Representative before election
Kay Granger
Republican
Elected U.S. Representative
Kay Granger
Republican

Incumbent Republican Kay Granger ran for re-election.

=== Predictions ===
Source	Ranking	As of
The Cook Political Report	Safe R	October 29, 2004
Sabato's Crystal Ball	Safe R	November 1, 2004

=== Results ===
Texas's 12th congressional district, 2004
Party	Candidate	Votes	%
Republican	Kay Granger (incumbent)	173,222	72.32
Democratic	Felix Alvarado	66,316	27.68
Total votes		239,538	100
Republican hold			

== District 13 ==
2004 Texas's 13th congressional district election
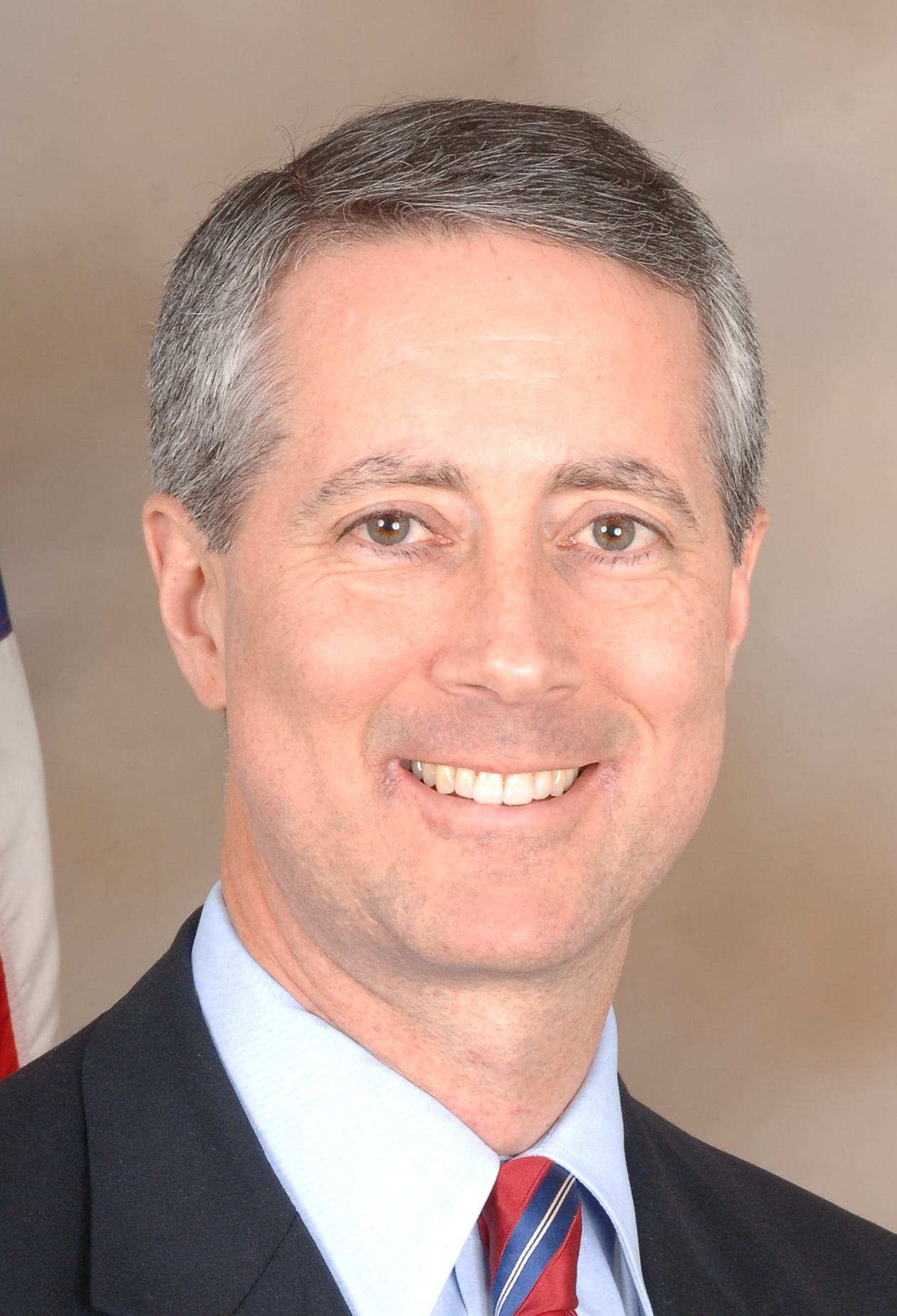

Nominee	Mac Thornberry	Smitty Smith
Party	Republican	Libertarian
Popular vote	189,448	15,793
Percentage	92.3%	7.7%
- County results Thornberry: 80–90% 90–100%
U.S. Representative before election
Mac Thornberry
Republican
Elected U.S. Representative
Mac Thornberry
Republican

Incumbent Republican Mac Thornberry ran for re-election.

=== Predictions ===
Source	Ranking	As of
The Cook Political Report	Safe R	October 29, 2004
Sabato's Crystal Ball	Safe R	November 1, 2004

=== Results ===
Texas's 13th congressional district, 2004
Party	Candidate	Votes	%
Republican	Mac Thornberry (incumbent)	189,448	92.31
Libertarian	Smitty Smith	15,793	7.69
Total votes		205,241	100
Republican hold			

== District 14 ==
2004 Texas's 14th congressional district election
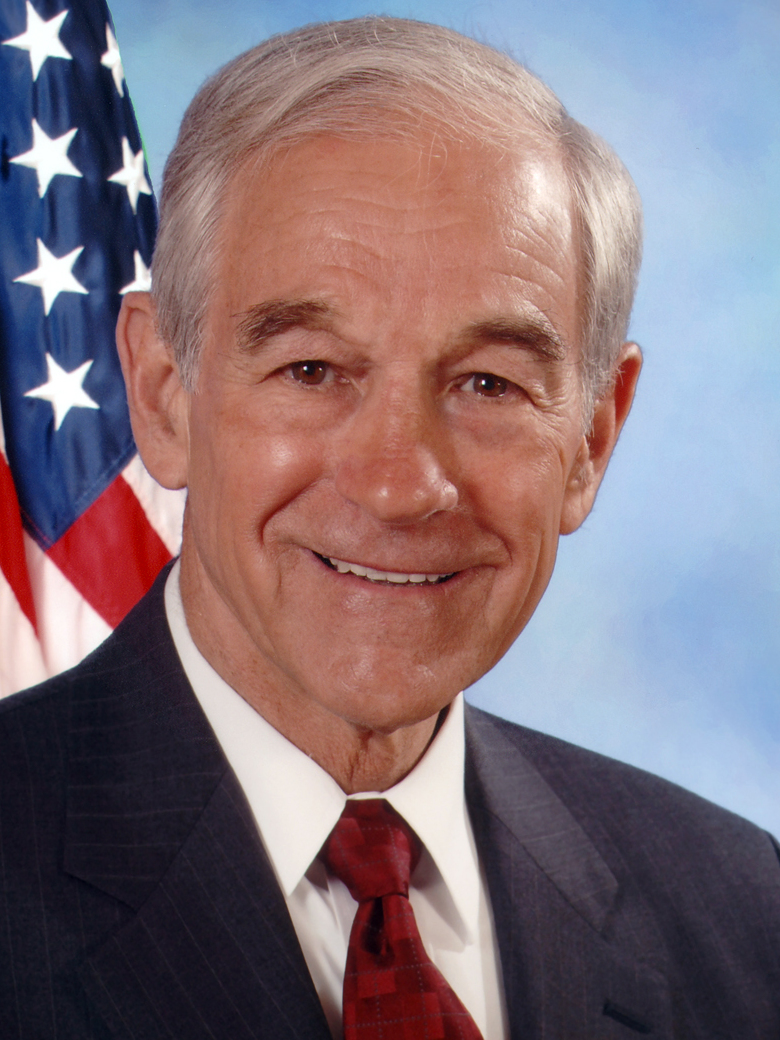
Nominee	Ron Paul
Party	Republican
Popular vote	173,668
Percentage	100.0%
U.S. Representative before election
Ron Paul
Republican
Elected U.S. Representative
Ron Paul
Republican

Incumbent Republican Ron Paul ran for re-election unopposed.

=== Predictions ===
Source	Ranking	As of
The Cook Political Report	Safe R	October 29, 2004
Sabato's Crystal Ball	Safe R	November 1, 2004

=== Results ===
Texas's 14th congressional district, 2004
Party	Candidate	Votes	%
Republican	Ron Paul (incumbent)	173,668	100.00
Total votes		173,668	100
Republican hold			

== District 15 ==
2004 Texas's 15th congressional district election
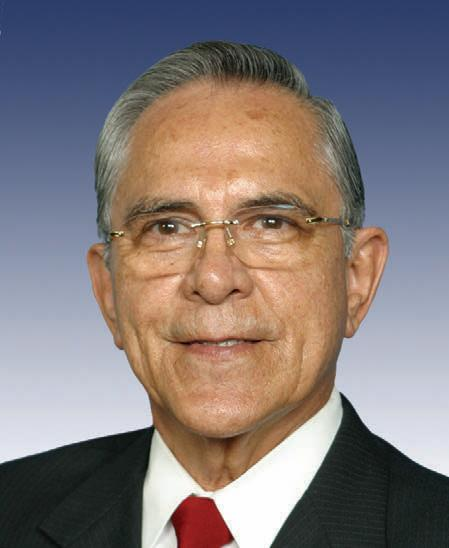

Nominee	Rubén Hinojosa	Michael Thamm
Party	Democratic	Republican
Popular vote	96,089	67,917
Percentage	57.8%	40.8%
- County results Thamm: 40–50% 50–60% 60–70% 70–80% Hinojosa: 50–60% 60–70% 80–90%
U.S. Representative before election
Rubén Hinojosa
Democratic
Elected U.S. Representative
Rubén Hinojosa
Democratic

Incumbent Democrat Ruben Hinojosa ran for re-election.

=== Predictions ===
Source	Ranking	As of
The Cook Political Report	Safe D	October 29, 2004
Sabato's Crystal Ball	Safe D	November 1, 2004

=== Results ===
Texas's 15th congressional district, 2004
Party	Candidate	Votes	%
Democratic	Rubén Hinojosa (incumbent)	96,089	57.76
Republican	Michael Thamm	67,917	40.83
Libertarian	William Cady	2,352	1.41
Total votes		166,358	100
Democratic hold			

== District 16 ==
2004 Texas's 16th congressional district election
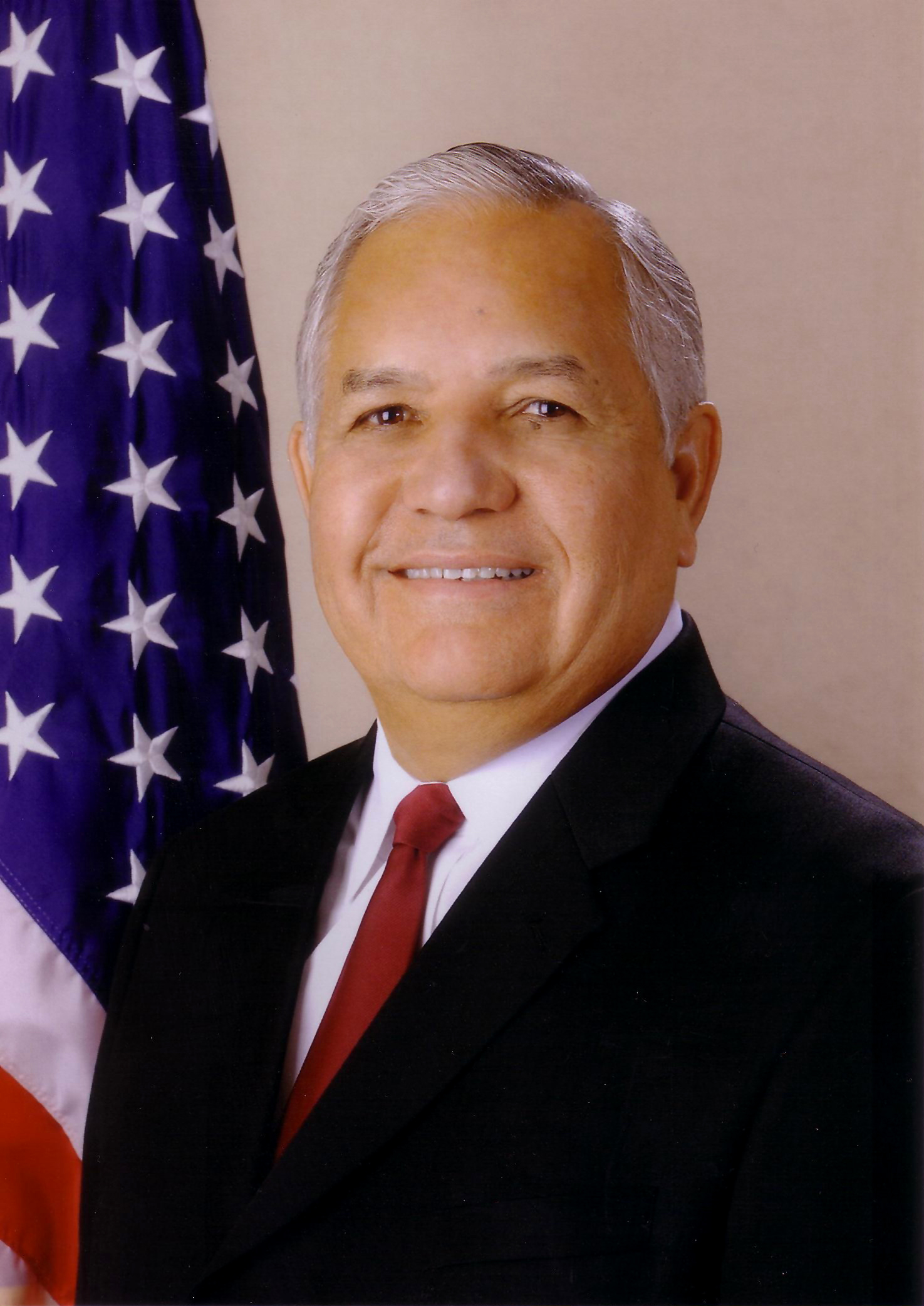

Nominee	Silvestre Reyes	David Brigham
Party	Democratic	Republican
Popular vote	108,577	49,972
Percentage	67.5%	31.1%
- County results Reyes: 60–70%
U.S. Representative before election
Silvestre Reyes
Democratic
Elected U.S. Representative
Silvestre Reyes
Democratic

Incumbent Democrat Silvestre Reyes ran for re-election.

=== Predictions ===
Source	Ranking	As of
The Cook Political Report	Safe D	October 29, 2004
Sabato's Crystal Ball	Safe D	November 1, 2004

=== Results ===
Texas's 16th congressional district, 2004
Party	Candidate	Votes	%
Democratic	Silvestre Reyes (incumbent)	108,577	67.53
Republican	David Brigham	49,972	31.08
Libertarian	Brad Clardy	2,224	1.38
Total votes		160,773	100
Democratic hold			

== District 17 ==
2004 Texas's 17th congressional district election
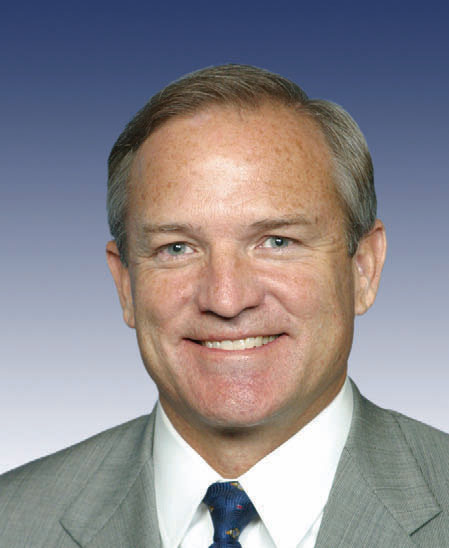

Nominee	Chet Edwards	Arlene Wohlgemuth
Party	Democratic	Republican
Popular vote	125,309	116,049
Percentage	51.2%	47.4%
- County results Edwards: 40–50% 50–60% 60–70% Wohlgemuth: 50–60% 60–70%
U.S. Representative before election
Chet Edwards
Democratic
Elected U.S. Representative
Chet Edwards
Democratic

Incumbent Democrat Charles Stenholm was redistricted to the 19th District. Democratic representative Chet Edwards was redistricted from the neighboring 11th District and ran for re-election here.

=== Predictions ===
Source	Ranking	As of
The Cook Political Report	Tossup	October 29, 2004
Sabato's Crystal Ball	Lean D	November 1, 2004

=== Results ===
Texas's 17th congressional district, 2004
Party	Candidate	Votes	%
Democratic	Chet Edwards (incumbent)	125,309	51.20
Republican	Arlene Wohlgemuth	116,049	47.42
Libertarian	Clyde Garland	3,390	1.39
Total votes		244,748	100
Democratic hold			

== District 18 ==
2004 Texas's 18th congressional district election
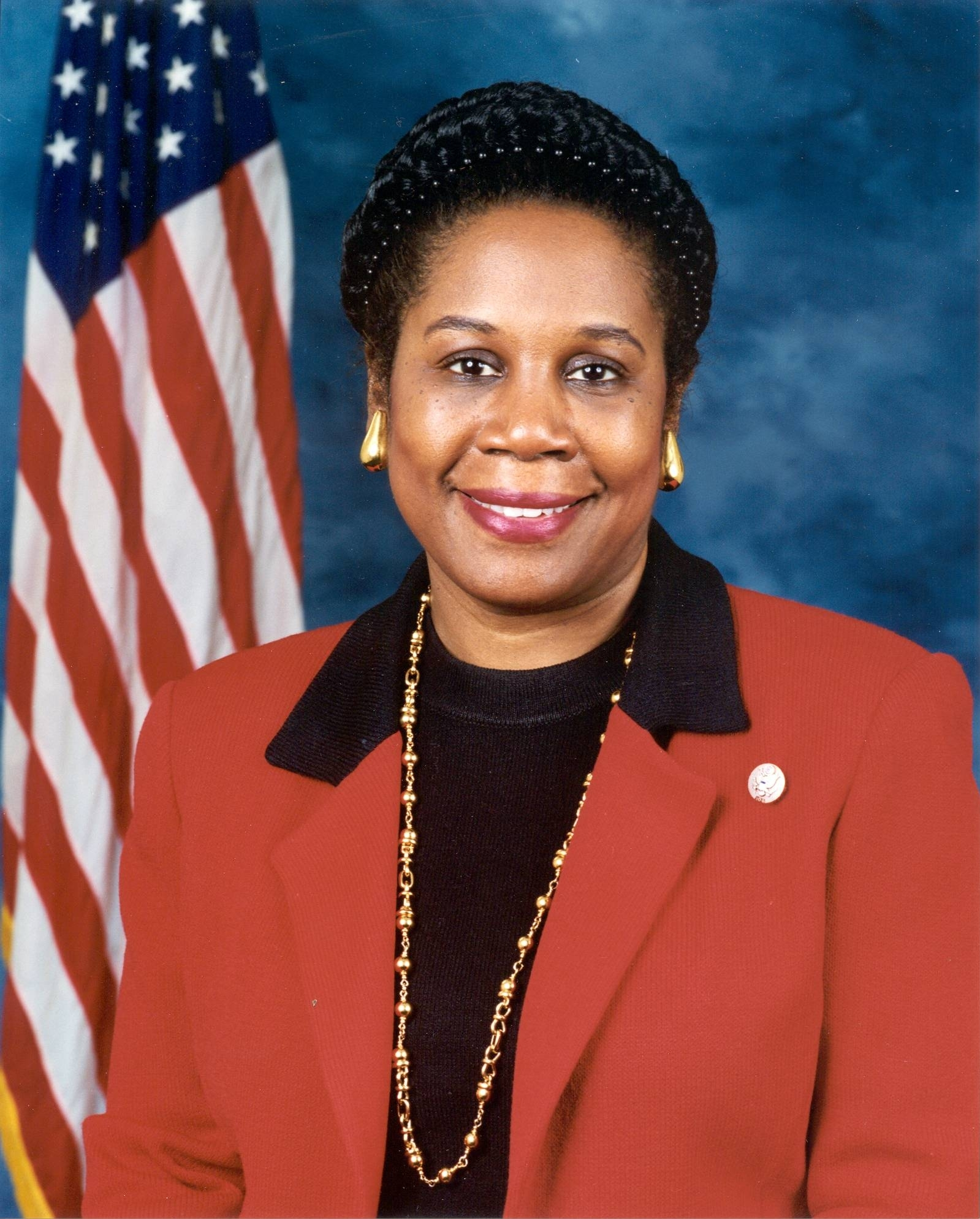

Nominee	Sheila Jackson Lee	Tom Bazán
Party	Democratic	Independent
Popular vote	136,018	9,787
Percentage	88.9%	6.4%
- County results Lee: 80–90%
U.S. Representative before election
Sheila Jackson Lee
Democratic
Elected U.S. Representative
Sheila Jackson Lee
Democratic

Incumbent Democrat Sheila Jackson Lee ran for re-election.

=== Predictions ===
Source	Ranking	As of
The Cook Political Report	Safe D	October 29, 2004
Sabato's Crystal Ball	Safe D	November 1, 2004

=== Results ===
Texas's 18th congressional district, 2004
Party	Candidate	Votes	%
Democratic	Sheila Jackson Lee (incumbent)	136,018	88.91
Independent	Tom Bazán	9,787	6.40
Libertarian	Brent Sullivan	7,183	4.70
Total votes		152,988	100
Democratic hold			

== District 19 ==
2004 Texas's 19th congressional district election
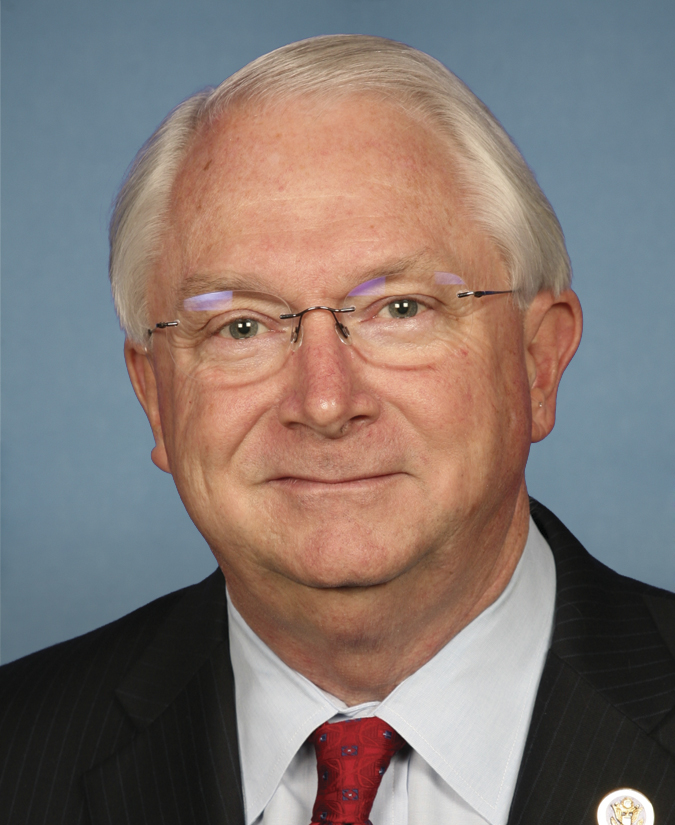

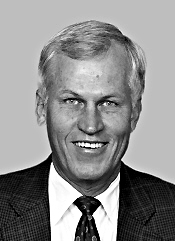
Nominee	Randy Neugebauer	Charles Stenholm
Party	Republican	Democratic
Popular vote	136,459	93,531
Percentage	58.44%	40.05%
- County results Arrington: 40–50% 50–60% 60–70% 70–80% Stenholm: 50–60% 60–70% 70–80%
U.S. Representative before election
Randy Neugebauer
Republican
Elected U.S. Representative
Randy Neugebauer
Republican

A week after winning re-election in 2002, incumbent Republican Larry Combest announced that he would resign on May 31, 2003. This prompted a special election to be held, which fellow Republican Randy Neugebauer won in a runoff. He ran for re-election. Democratic representative Charles Stenholm was redistricted from the neighboring 17th District and also ran for re-election here.

=== Predictions ===
Source	Ranking	As of
The Cook Political Report	Lean R	October 29, 2004
Sabato's Crystal Ball	Lean R	November 1, 2004

=== Results ===
Texas's 19th congressional district, 2004
Party	Candidate	Votes	%
Republican	Randy Neugebauer (incumbent)	136,459	58.44
Democratic	Charles Stenholm (incumbent)	93,531	40.05
Libertarian	Richard Peterson	3,524	1.51
Total votes		233,514	100
Republican hold			

== District 20 ==
2004 Texas's 20th congressional district election
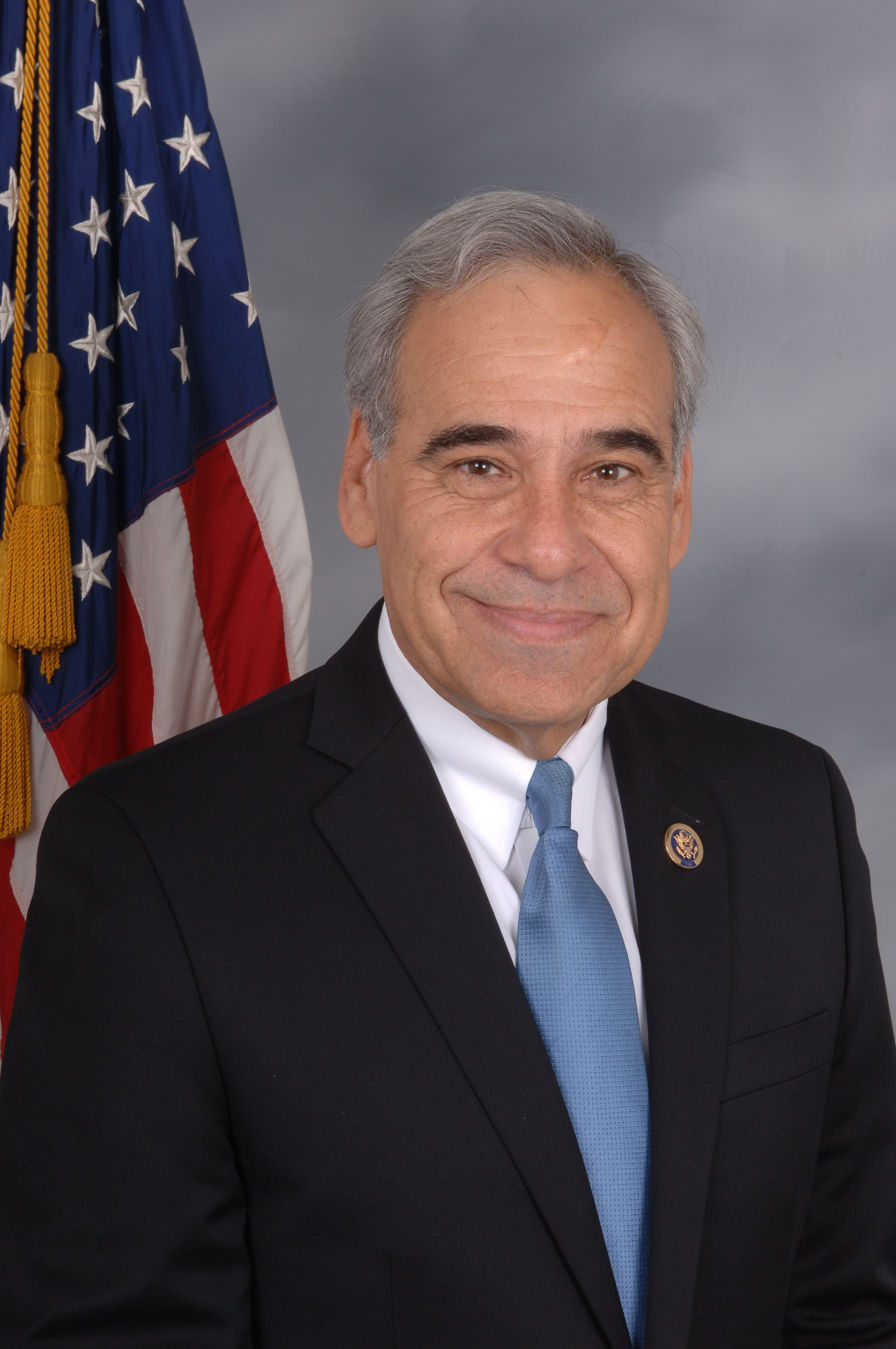

Nominee	Charlie Gonzalez	Roger Scott
Party	Democratic	Republican
Popular vote	112,480	54,976
Percentage	65.5%	32.0%
- County results Gonzalez: 60–70%
U.S. Representative before election
Charlie Gonzalez
Democratic
Elected U.S. Representative
Charlie Gonzalez
Democratic

Incumbent Democrat Charlie Gonzalez ran for re-election.

=== Predictions ===
Source	Ranking	As of
The Cook Political Report	Safe D	October 29, 2004
Sabato's Crystal Ball	Safe D	November 1, 2004

=== Results ===
Texas's 20th congressional district, 2004
Party	Candidate	Votes	%
Democratic	Charlie Gonzalez (incumbent)	112,480	65.47
Republican	Roger Scott	54,976	32.00
Libertarian	Jessie Bouley	2,377	1.38
Independent	Michael Idrogo	1,971	1.15
Total votes		171,804	100
Republican hold			

== District 21 ==
2004 Texas's 21st congressional district election
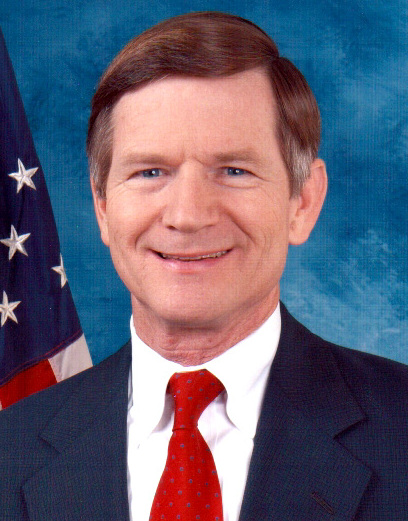

Nominee	Lamar Smith	Rhett Smith
Party	Republican	Democratic
Popular vote	209,774	121,129
Percentage	61.5%	35.5%
- County results Smith: 50–60% 60–70% 70–80% 80–90%
U.S. Representative before election
Lamar Smith
Republican
Elected U.S. Representative
Lamar Smith
Republican

Incumbent Republican Lamar Smith ran for re-election.

=== Predictions ===
Source	Ranking	As of
The Cook Political Report	Safe R	October 29, 2004
Sabato's Crystal Ball	Safe R	November 1, 2004

=== Results ===
Texas's 21st congressional district, 2004
Party	Candidate	Votes	%
Republican	Lamar Smith (incumbent)	209,774	61.50
Democratic	Rhett Smith	121,129	35.51
Libertarian	Jason Pratt	10,216	2.99
Total votes		341,119	100
Republican hold			

== District 22 ==
2004 Texas's 22nd congressional district election
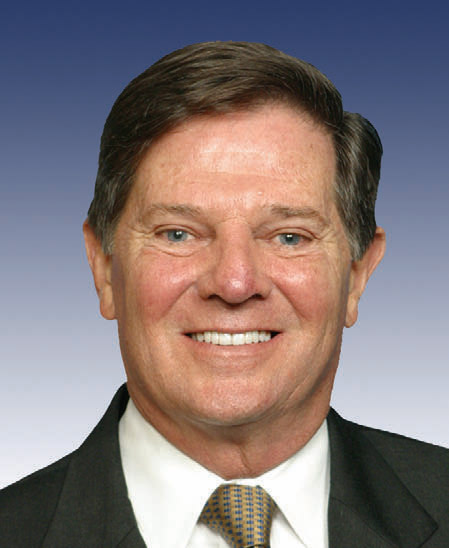

Nominee	Tom DeLay	Richard Morrison
Party	Republican	Democratic
Popular vote	150,386	112,034
Percentage	55.2%	41.1%
- County results Delay: 50–60% Morrison: 50–60%
U.S. Representative before election
Tom DeLay
Republican
Elected U.S. Representative
Tom DeLay
Republican

Incumbent Republican Tom DeLay ran for re-election.

=== Predictions ===
Source	Ranking	As of
The Cook Political Report	Safe R	October 29, 2004
Sabato's Crystal Ball	Safe R	November 1, 2004

=== Results ===
Texas's 22nd congressional district, 2004
Party	Candidate	Votes	%
Republican	Tom DeLay (incumbent)	150,386	55.16
Democratic	Richard Morrison	112,034	41.10
Independent	Michael Fjetland	5,314	1.95
Libertarian	Tom Morrison	4,886	1.79
Total votes		272,620	100
Republican hold			

== District 23 ==
2004 Texas's 23rd congressional district election
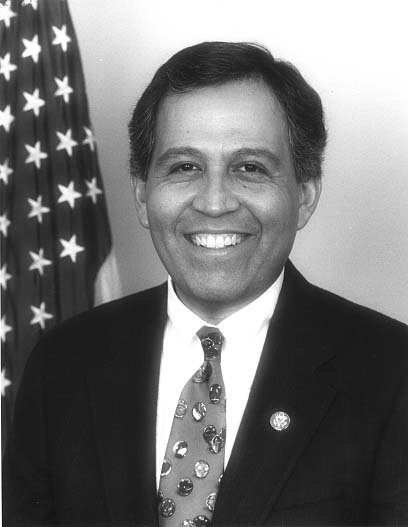

Nominee	Henry Bonilla	Joe Sullivan
Party	Republican	Democratic
Popular vote	170,716	72,480
Percentage	69.3%	29.4%
- County results Bonilla: 40–50% 50–60% 60–70% 70–80% 80–90% Sullivan: 50–60% 60–70%
U.S. Representative before election
Henry Bonilla
Republican
Elected U.S. Representative
Henry Bonilla
Republican

Incumbent Republican Henry Bonilla ran for re-election.

=== Predictions ===
Source	Ranking	As of
The Cook Political Report	Safe R	October 29, 2004
Sabato's Crystal Ball	Safe R	November 1, 2004

=== Results ===
Texas's 23rd congressional district, 2004
Party	Candidate	Votes	%
Republican	Henry Bonilla (incumbent)	170,716	69.26
Democratic	Joe Sullivan	72,480	29.40
Libertarian	Nazirite Perez	3,307	1.34
Total votes		246,503	100
Republican hold			

== District 24 ==
2004 Texas's 24th congressional district election
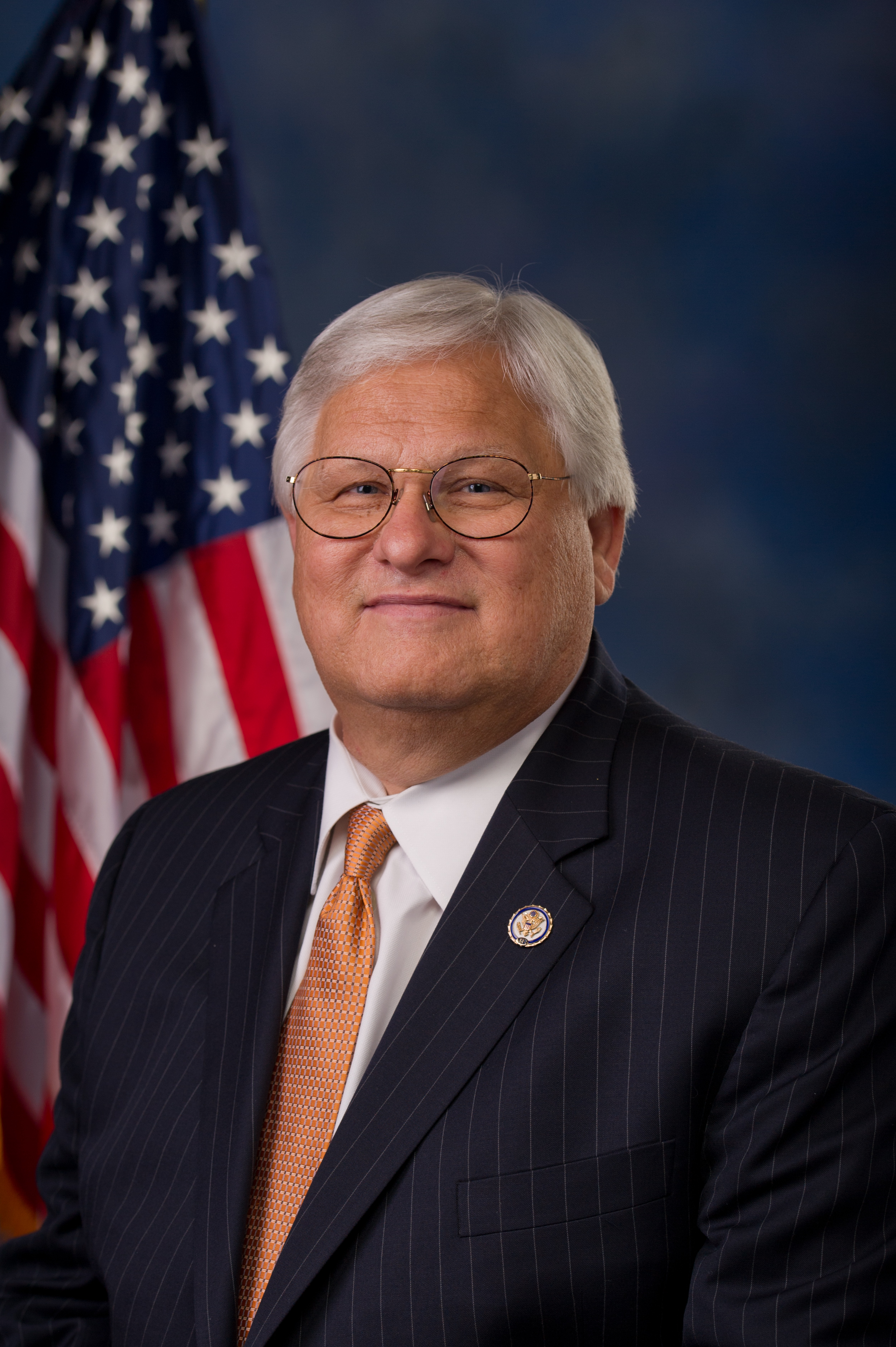

Nominee	Kenny Marchant	Gary Page
Party	Republican	Democratic
Popular vote	154,435	82,599
Percentage	64.0%	34.2%
- County results Marchant: 50–60% 60–70%
U.S. Representative before election
Martin Frost
Democratic
Elected U.S. Representative
Kenny Marchant
Republican

Incumbent Democrat Martin Frost was redistricted to the 32nd District. He ran for re-election there.

=== Predictions ===
Source	Ranking	As of
The Cook Political Report	Safe R (flip)	October 29, 2004
Sabato's Crystal Ball	Safe R (flip)	November 1, 2004

=== Results ===
Texas's 14th congressional district, 2004
Party	Candidate	Votes	%
Republican	Kenny Marchant	154,435	63.98
Democratic	Gary Page	82,599	34.22
Libertarian	James Lawrence	4,340	1.80
Total votes		241,374	100.00
Republican gain from Democratic			

== District 25 ==
2004 Texas's 25th congressional district election
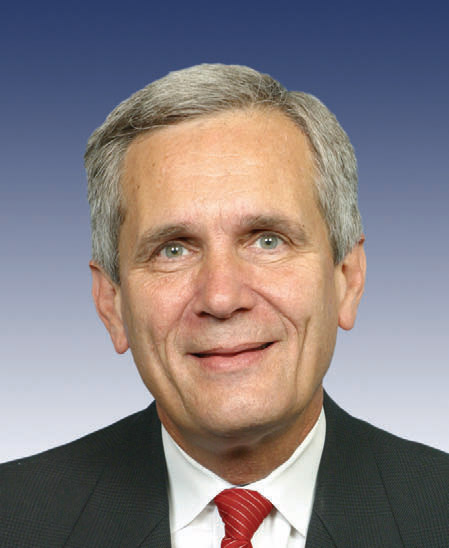

Nominee	Lloyd Doggett	Rebecca Armendariz Klein
Party	Democratic	Republican
Popular vote	108,309	49,252
Percentage	67.6%	30.7%
- County results Doggett: 50–60% 70–80% Klein: 50–60% 60–70%
U.S. Representative before election
Lloyd Doggett
Democratic
Elected U.S. Representative
Lloyd Doggett
Democratic

Incumbent Democrat Chris Bell was redistricted to the 9th District. He ran for re-election there but lost in the primary to Al Green. Democratic representative Lloyd Doggett was redistricted from the neighboring 10th District and ran for re-election here.

=== Predictions ===
Source	Ranking	As of
The Cook Political Report	Safe D	October 29, 2004
Sabato's Crystal Ball	Safe D	November 1, 2004

=== Results ===
Texas's 25th congressional district, 2004
Party	Candidate	Votes	%
Democratic	Lloyd Doggett (incumbent)	108,309	67.60
Republican	Rebecca Armendariz Klein	49,252	30.74
Libertarian	James Werner	2,656	1.66
Total votes		160,217	100
Democratic hold			

== District 26 ==
2004 Texas's 26th congressional district election
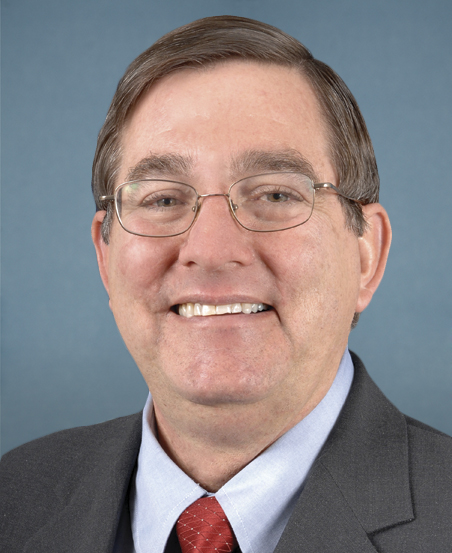

Nominee	Michael Burgess	Lico Reyes
Party	Republican	Democratic
Popular vote	180,519	89,809
Percentage	65.8%	32.7%
- County results Burgess: 50–60% 70–80%
U.S. Representative before election
Michael Burgess
Republican
Elected U.S. Representative
Michael Burgess
Republican

Incumbent Republican Michael Burgess ran for re-election.

=== Predictions ===
Source	Ranking	As of
The Cook Political Report	Safe R	October 29, 2004
Sabato's Crystal Ball	Safe R	November 1, 2004

=== Results ===
Texas's 26th congressional district, 2004
Party	Candidate	Votes	%
Republican	Michael Burgess (incumbent)	180,519	65.75
Democratic	Lico Reyes	89,809	32.71
Libertarian	James Gholston	4,211	1.53
Total votes		274,539	100
Republican hold			

== District 27 ==
2004 Texas's 27th congressional district election
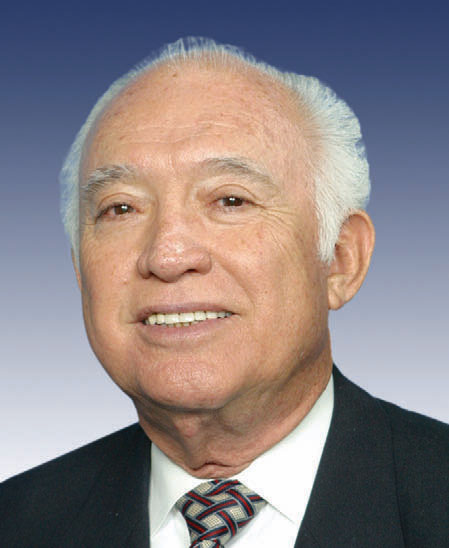

Nominee	Solomon P. Ortiz	Willie Vaden
Party	Democratic	Republican
Popular vote	112,081	61,955
Percentage	63.1%	34.9%
- County results Ortiz: 60–70% 70–80% Vaden: 50–60%
U.S. Representative before election
Solomon P. Ortiz
Democratic
Elected U.S. Representative
Solomon P. Ortiz
Democratic

Incumbent Democrat Solomon Ortiz ran for re-election.

=== Predictions ===
Source	Ranking	As of
The Cook Political Report	Safe D	October 29, 2004
Sabato's Crystal Ball	Safe D	November 1, 2004

=== Results ===
Texas's 27th congressional district, 2004
Party	Candidate	Votes	%
Democratic	Solomon P. Ortiz (incumbent)	112,081	63.13
Republican	Willie Vaden	61,955	34.90
Libertarian	Christopher Claytor	3,500	1.97
Total votes		177,536	100
Democratic hold			

== District 28 ==
2004 Texas's 28th congressional district election
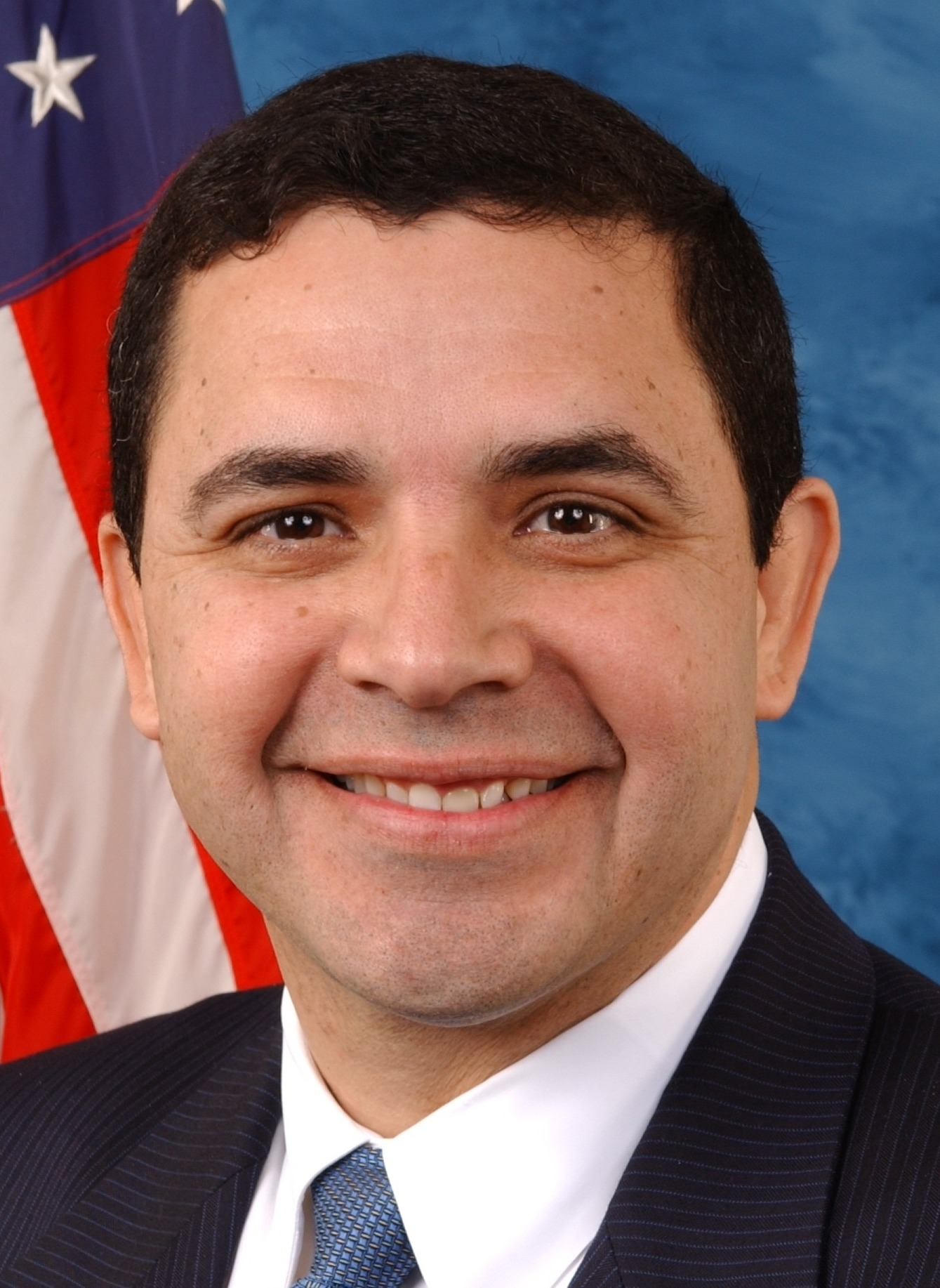

Nominee	Henry Cuellar	Jim Hopson
Party	Democratic	Republican
Popular vote	106,323	69,538
Percentage	59.0%	38.6%
- County results Cuellar: 50–60% 60–70% 70–80% 80–90% Hopson: 40–50% 50–60% 60–70%
U.S. Representative before election
Ciro Rodriguez
Democratic
Elected U.S. Representative
Henry Cuellar
Democratic

Incumbent Democrat Ciro Rodriguez ran for re-election but lost in the primary to Henry Cuellar.

=== Predictions ===
Source	Ranking	As of
The Cook Political Report	Safe D	October 29, 2004
Sabato's Crystal Ball	Safe D	November 1, 2004

=== Results ===
Texas's 28th congressional district, 2004
Party	Candidate	Votes	%
Democratic	Henry Cuellar	106,323	59.01
Republican	Jim Hopson	69,538	38.60
Libertarian	Ken Ashby	4,305	2.39
Total votes		180,166	100
Democratic hold			

== District 29 ==
2004 Texas's 29th congressional district election
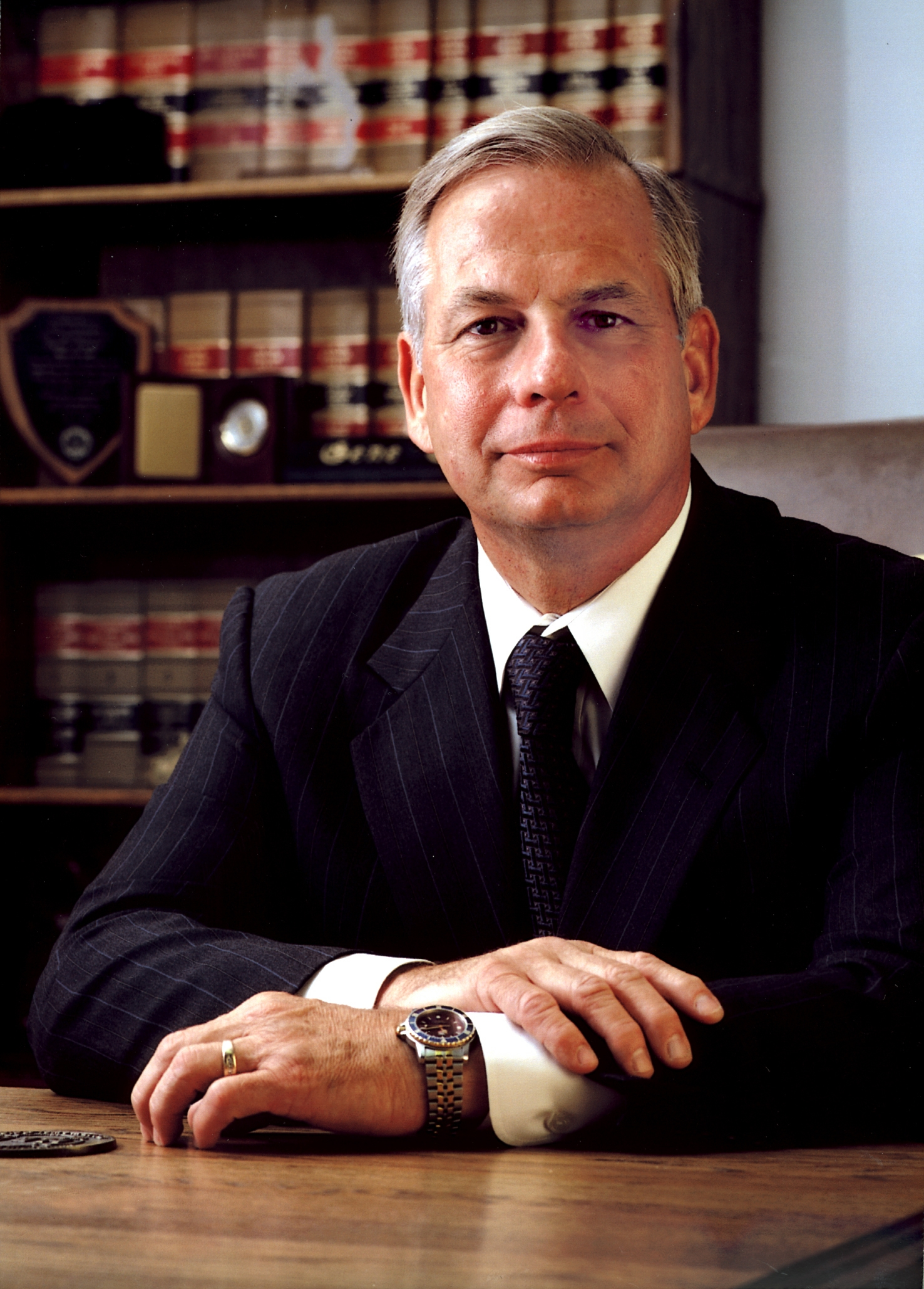

Nominee	Gene Green	Clifford Messina
Party	Democratic	Libertarian
Popular vote	78,256	4,868
Percentage	94.1%	5.9%
- County results Green: 90–100%
U.S. Representative before election
Gene Green
Democratic
Elected U.S. Representative
Gene Green
Democratic

Incumbent Democrat Gene Green ran for re-election.

=== Predictions ===
Source	Ranking	As of
The Cook Political Report	Safe D	October 29, 2004
Sabato's Crystal Ball	Safe D	November 1, 2004

=== Results ===
Texas's 29th congressional district, 2004
Party	Candidate	Votes	%
Democratic	Gene Green (incumbent)	78,256	94.14
Libertarian	Clifford Messina	4,868	5.86
Total votes		83,124	100
Democratic hold			

== District 30 ==
2004 Texas's 30th congressional district election
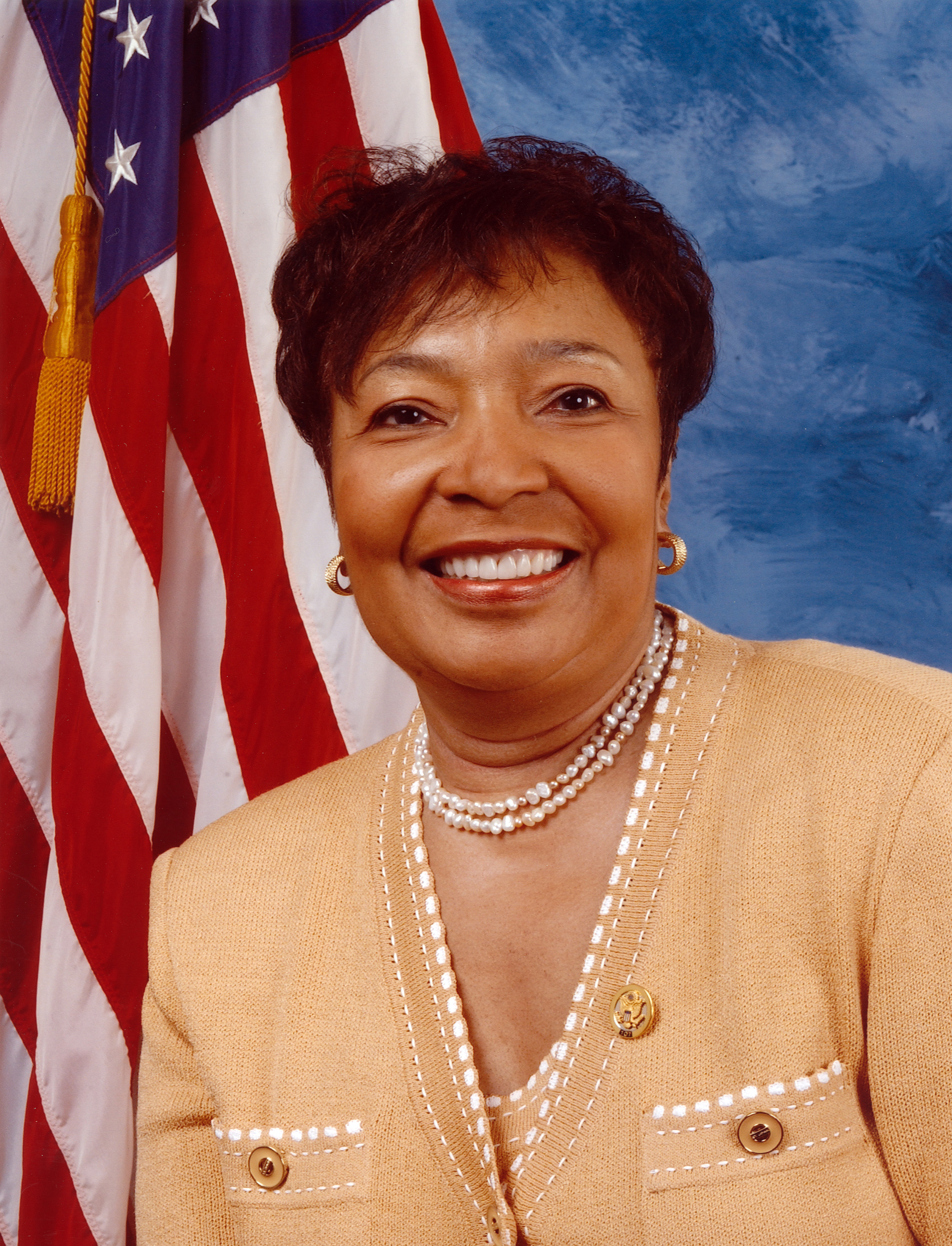

Nominee	Eddie Bernice Johnson	John Davis
Party	Democratic	Libertarian
Popular vote	144,513	10,821
Percentage	93.0%	7.0%
- County results Johnson: 90–100%
U.S. Representative before election
Eddie Bernice Johnson
Democratic
Elected U.S. Representative
Eddie Bernice Johnson
Democratic

Incumbent Democrat Eddie Bernice Johnson ran for re-election.

=== Predictions ===
Source	Ranking	As of
The Cook Political Report	Safe D	October 29, 2004
Sabato's Crystal Ball	Safe D	November 1, 2004

=== Results ===
Texas's 30th congressional district, 2004
Party	Candidate	Votes	%
Democratic	Eddie Bernice Johnson (incumbent)	144,513	93.03
Libertarian	John Davis	10,821	6.97
Total votes		155,334	100
Democratic hold			

== District 31 ==
2004 Texas's 31st congressional district election
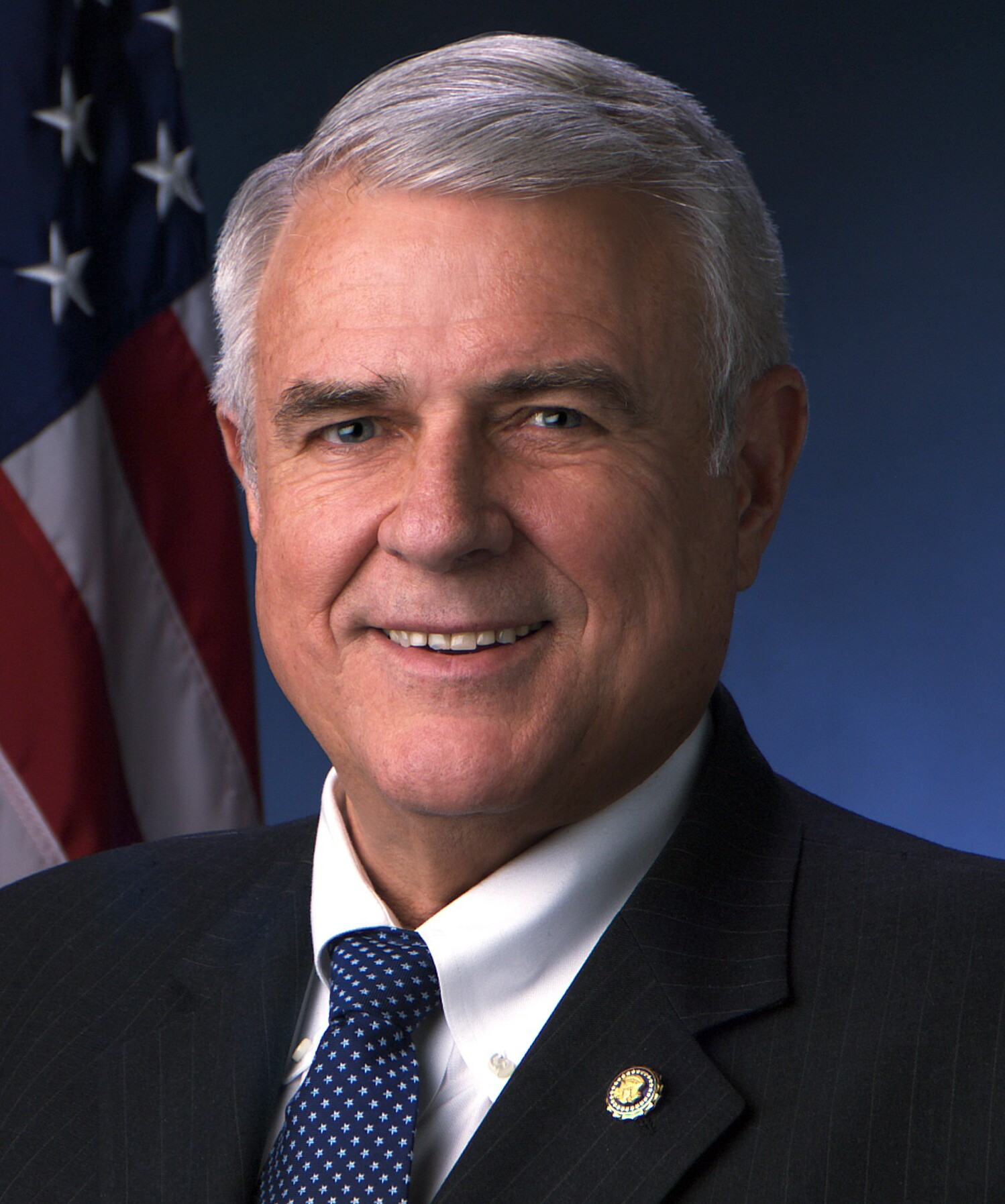

Nominee	John Carter	Jon Porter
Party	Republican	Democratic
Popular vote	160,247	80,292
Percentage	64.8%	32.5%
- County results Carter: 50–60% 60–70% 70–80%
U.S. Representative before election
John Carter
Republican
Elected U.S. Representative
John Carter
Republican

Incumbent Republican John Carter ran for re-election.

=== Predictions ===
Source	Ranking	As of
The Cook Political Report	Safe R	October 29, 2004
Sabato's Crystal Ball	Safe R	November 1, 2004

=== Results ===
Texas's 31st congressional district, 2004
Party	Candidate	Votes	%
Republican	John Carter (incumbent)	160,247	64.77
Democratic	Jon Porter	80,292	32.45
Libertarian	Celeste Adams	6,888	2.78
Total votes		247,427	100
Republican hold			

== District 32 ==
2004 Texas's 32nd congressional district election

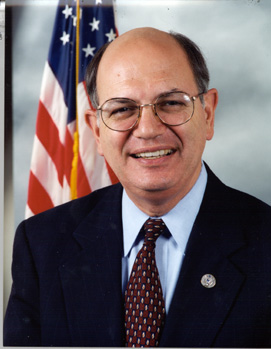
Nominee	Pete Sessions	Martin Frost
Party	Republican	Democratic
Popular vote	109,859	89,030
Percentage	54.3%	44.0%
- County results Sessions: 50–60%
U.S. Representative before election
Pete Sessions
Republican
Elected U.S. Representative
Pete Sessions
Republican

Incumbent Republican Pete Sessions ran for re-election. Democratic representative Martin Frost was redistricted from the neighboring 24th District and also ran for re-election here.

=== Predictions ===
Source	Ranking	As of
The Cook Political Report	Tossup	October 29, 2004
Sabato's Crystal Ball	Tilt R	November 1, 2004

=== Results ===
Texas's 32nd congressional district, 2004
Party	Candidate	Votes	%
Republican	Pete Sessions (incumbent)	109,859	54.32
Democratic	Martin Frost (incumbent)	89,030	44.02
Libertarian	Michael Needleman	3,347	1.65
Total votes		202,236	100
Republican hold			

== See also ==
- 2004 United States House of Representatives elections
