= Mike Conaway =

American politician (born 1948)

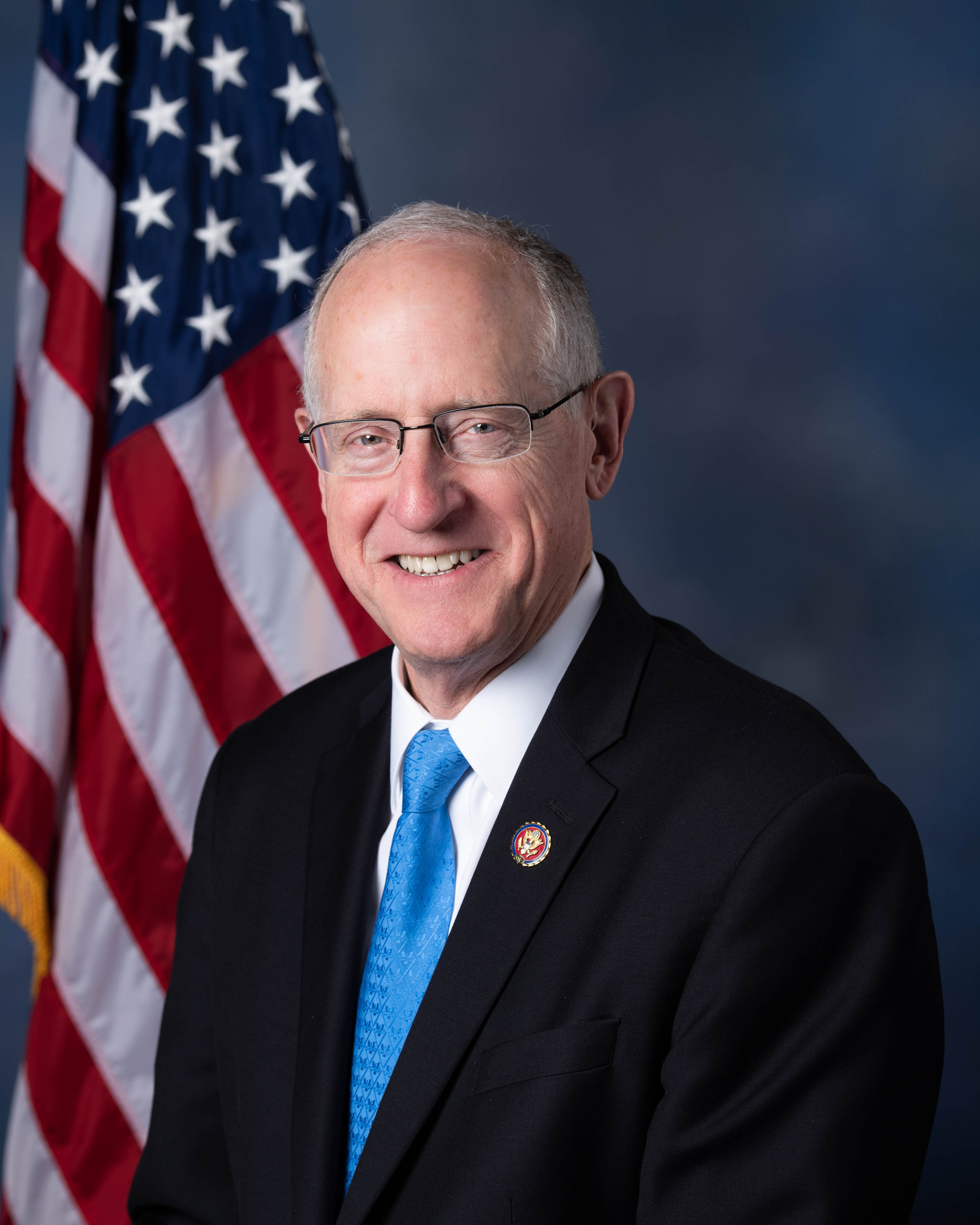
- Official portrait, 2020

Ranking Member of the House Agriculture Committee
- In office January 3, 2019 – January 3, 2021
- Preceded by: Collin Peterson
- Succeeded by: Glenn Thompson

Chair of the House Agriculture Committee
- In office January 3, 2015 – January 3, 2019
- Preceded by: Frank Lucas
- Succeeded by: Collin Peterson

Chair of the House Ethics Committee
- In office January 3, 2013 – January 3, 2015
- Preceded by: Jo Bonner
- Succeeded by: Charlie Dent

Member of the U.S. House of Representatives from Texas's 11th district
- In office January 3, 2005 – January 3, 2021
- Preceded by: Constituency established
- Succeeded by: August Pfluger

Personal details
- Born: Kenneth Michael Conaway; June 11, 1948 (age 78) Borger, Texas, U.S.
- Party: Republican
- Spouse: Suzanne Kidwell (m. 1991)
- Education: Ranger College; Texas A&M University, Commerce (BBA)

Military service
- Branch/service: United States Army
- Years of service: 1970–1972
- Rank: Specialist 5
- Awards: Army Commendation Medal
- Conaway's voice Conaway supporting the Agriculture Improvement Act of 2018. Recorded December 12, 2018

Kenneth Michael Conaway (born June 11, 1948) is an American politician who was the U.S. representative for Texas's 11th congressional district from 2005 to 2021. He is a member of the Republican Party. The district Conaway represented is located in West Texas and includes Midland, Odessa, San Angelo, Brownwood, and Granbury. Conaway led the investigation into Russian interference in the 2016 United States elections (with assistance from Trey Gowdy and Tom Rooney) after the Intelligence Committee chair, Devin Nunes, recused himself. Aside from serving as the chair of the House Ethics Committee, he served as the chair of the House Agriculture Committee, and later its ranking member. Conaway indicated in July 2019 that he would not be seeking reelection. Conaway was succeeded by fellow Republican August Pfluger.

== Background ==
Conaway was born in Borger in the Texas Panhandle northeast of Amarillo, the son of Helen Jean (McCormick) and Louis Denton Conaway. He graduated in 1966 from Permian High School in Odessa in Ector County, where he was a standout player for the Permian Panthers and a member of the first Permian State Championship team in 1965. After High School, he attended Ranger College on a football scholarship before attending Texas A&M University-Commerce (then named East Texas State University), lettering in football for the Lions from 1966 to 1969 and playing in two Lone Star Conference championship teams. He majored in Accounting, graduating in 1970.

== Career ==
=== Military ===
Conaway served in the United States Army from 1970 to 1972.

=== Private sector ===
Conaway was an accountant and became a Certified Public Accountant in 1974, chief financial officer at a bank, and from 1981 to 1986 was the chief financial officer of Arbusto Energy Inc, an oil and gas exploration firm operated by George W. Bush.

=== Texas government ===
Soon after Bush was elected governor of Texas, he appointed Conaway to the Texas State Board of Public Accountancy, which regulates accountancy in Texas. He served on the board as a volunteer for seven years, the last five as chairman.

=== U.S. House of Representatives ===
Committee assignments (116th Congress)

- Committee on Agriculture (Ranking Member)
- Committee on Armed Services
  - Subcommittee on Intelligence, Emerging Threats and Capabilities
  - Subcommittee on Seapower and Projection Forces
- Permanent Select Committee on Intelligence

Caucus memberships

- CPA Caucus (Founder)
- International Conservation Caucus
- Reliable Energy Caucus
- Sportsmen's Caucus
- Congressional Constitution Caucus
- Congressional Western Caucus
- United States Congressional International Conservation Caucus

==== Tenure ====
Conaway endorsed former Massachusetts Governor Mitt Romney for president in 2008. On May 13, 2016, Conaway endorsed the Republican presumptive nominee Donald Trump for president in the 2016 U.S. presidential election.

In 2006, Conaway voted against extending the Voting Rights Act of 1965.

Conaway served on committees of the National Republican Congressional Committee (NRCC), the campaign arm of the House Republican caucus. In January 2007, Conaway began chairing the three-member audit committee for the NRCC. By January 28, 2008, Conaway had uncovered a fraud, where hundreds of thousands of dollars were missing from NRCC bank accounts, and supposed annual audits on the NRCC books had actually not been performed since 2001.

Conaway introduced legislation to extend and reform the federal tax credit to support wide scale commercial deployment of carbon capture and storage.

Speaker Paul Ryan announced Conaway's new role as leader of the House Intelligence Committee in April 2017 after chairman Devin Nunes temporarily recused himself from investigations into Russian interference in the U.S. 2016 election.

In February 2018, Conaway prevented efforts by the Democrats on the House Intelligence Committee to investigate financial links between Trump, his businesses, his family and Russian actors. Conaway prevented subpoenas for related bank records, Trump's tax returns and witnesses. Democrats on the committee had, for example, asked for subpoenas to Deutsche Bank, which the Trump Organization and Jared Kushner (Trump's son-in-law and senior White House advisor) have borrowed extensively from.

In March 2018, Conaway laid out the findings of a report by the Republican members of the House Intelligence Committee. One of the findings was that the committee had found no evidence of collusion between Russia and the Trump campaign in the 2016 election; Democrats on the committee said that they had come to no such conclusion. A few days later, Conaway walked back that finding, saying "Our committee was not charged with answering the collusion idea". Asked why the committee drew a conclusion if it had not investigated the matter, Conaway denied that the committee had drawn a conclusion, "What we said is we found no evidence of it. That’s a different statement. We found no evidence of collusion."

==== Political campaigns ====
Conaway first ran for elective office in 2003, when he ran in a special election for the 19th Congressional District, which came open after 18-year Republican incumbent Larry Combest stepped down shortly after winning a 10th term. Conaway lost by 587 votes to fellow Republican Randy Neugebauer. A few months later, the Texas Legislature redrew the state's districts in an effort engineered by then-House Majority Leader Tom DeLay. Three brand-new districts were created, one of them being the 11th, which was based in Midland. Previously, Midland had been part of the Lubbock-based 19th District. DeLay was particularly keen to draw a district based in Midland, Odessa and the oil-rich Permian Basin in part because Texas House Speaker Tom Craddick was from that area. This district is heavily Republican – by some accounts, it was the most Republican district in Texas at the time. Republicans had dominated every level of government since the 1980s, and usually garner 70 percent or more of the vote in this area (Glasscock County had voted 93 percent for Bush in 2000, the highest percentage of any county in the nation). The race was essentially over when Conaway announced his candidacy, though it was so heavily Republican that any Democrat would have faced nearly impossible odds in any event. He won in November with 77 percent of the vote, one of the largest percentages by anyone facing major-party opposition.

Conaway was reelected six times with no substantive opposition. He only faced a Democratic challenger three other times–in 2010, 2012 and 2018. Each time, he won at least 75 percent of the vote; neither Democrat cleared 20 percent. Underscoring how Republican this district was, he reelected unopposed in 2006, a year in which Republicans suffered heavy losses nationally. He faced only minor party opposition in 2008 (another year of severe Republican losses nationally), 2014, and 2016, winning each time with roughly 90% of the vote.

Conaway won re-nomination to a sixth term in the U.S. House in the Republican primary held on March 4, 2014. He polled 53,107 votes (74 percent); his challenger, Wade Brown, received 18,979 votes (26 percent).

Conaway won re-election in the general election held on November 4, 2014. He polled 107,752 votes (90 percent); his challenger, Libertarian Ryan T. Lange, received 11,607 (10 percent).

Conaway announced in July 2019 that he would not be running for reelection.

==== Committee assignments ====
116th Congress

- Committee on Agriculture (Ranking Member)
- Committee on Armed Services
- Committee on Intelligence

== Personal life ==
Conaway served on the Midland Independent School District Board from 1985 to 1988.

Conaway is married to Suzanne Kidwell Conaway and their family includes two sons, two daughters, and seven grandchildren.

== Electoral history ==
US House election, 2018: Texas District 11
Party	Candidate	Votes	%	±%
Republican	Mike Conaway (incumbent)	176,603	80.14	−9.36
Democratic	Jennie Leeder	40,631	18.44	+18.44
Libertarian	Rhett Smith	3,143	1.43	−9.07
Majority		135,972	61.70	−17.30
Turnout		220,377		
Republican hold		Swing		

US House election, 2016: Texas District 11
Party	Candidate	Votes	%	±%
Republican	Mike Conaway (incumbent)	201,871	89.50	−0.77
Libertarian	Nicholas Landholt	23,677	10.50	+0.77
Majority		178,194	79.00	−1.54
Turnout		225,548		
Republican hold		Swing		

US House election, 2014: Texas District 11
Party	Candidate	Votes	%	±%
Republican	Mike Conaway (incumbent)	107,939	90.27	+11.63
Libertarian	Ryan Lange	11,635	9.73	+6.94
Majority		96,304	80.54	+20.47
Turnout		119,574		
Republican hold		Swing		

US House election, 2012: Texas District 11
Party	Candidate	Votes	%	±%
Republican	Mike Conaway (incumbent)	177,742	78.64	−2.20
Democratic	Jim Riley	41,970	18.57	+3.13
Libertarian	Scott Ballard	6,311	2.79	+0.01
Majority		135,772	60.07	−5.33
Turnout		226,023		
Republican hold		Swing		

US House election, 2010: Texas District 11
Party	Candidate	Votes	%	±%
Republican	Mike Conaway (incumbent)	125,581	80.84	−7.49
Democratic	James Quillian	23,989	15.44	+3.77
Libertarian	James Powell	4,321	2.78	+2.78
Green	Jim Howe	1,449	0.93	+0.93
Majority		101,592	65.40	−11.26
Turnout		155,340		
Republican hold		Swing		

US House election, 2008: Texas District 11
Party	Candidate	Votes	%	±%
Republican	Mike Conaway (incumbent)	189,625	88.33	−11.67
Libertarian	John Strohm	25,051	11.67	+11.67
Majority		164,574	76.66	−23.34
Turnout		214,676		
Republican hold		Swing		

US House election, 2006: Texas District 11
Party	Candidate	Votes	%	±%
Republican	Mike Conaway (incumbent)	107,268	100.00	+23.24
Majority		107,268	100.00	+45.03
Turnout		107,268		
Republican hold		Swing		

2004 United States House of Representatives elections in Texas: District 11
Party	Candidate	Votes	%	±%
Republican	Mike Conaway	177,291	76.8%	+29.7%
Democratic	Wayne Raasch	50,339	21.8%	−29.8%
Libertarian	Jeffrey Blunt	3,347	1.4%	+0.1%
Majority		126,952	55.0%	
Turnout		230,977		
Republican gain from Democratic		Swing	+29.7%	

== See also ==
- Timeline of investigations into Trump and Russia (2019)

U.S. House of Representatives
Preceded by Chet Edwards	Member of the U.S. House of Representatives from Texas's 11th congressional district 2005–2021	Succeeded by August Pfluger
Preceded by Jo Bonner	Chair of the House Ethics Committee; 2013–2015	Succeeded by Charlie Dent
Preceded by Frank Lucas	Chair of the House Agriculture Committee; 2015–2019	Succeeded by Collin Peterson
Preceded by Collin Peterson	Ranking Member of the House Agriculture Committee; 2019–2021	Succeeded by Glenn Thompson
U.S. order of precedence (ceremonial)
Preceded by Jeb Hensarling as Former U.S. Representative	Order of precedence of the United States as Former U.S. Representative	Succeeded by Kenny Marchant as Former U.S. Representative
