= August Pfluger =

American military officer and politician (born 1977)

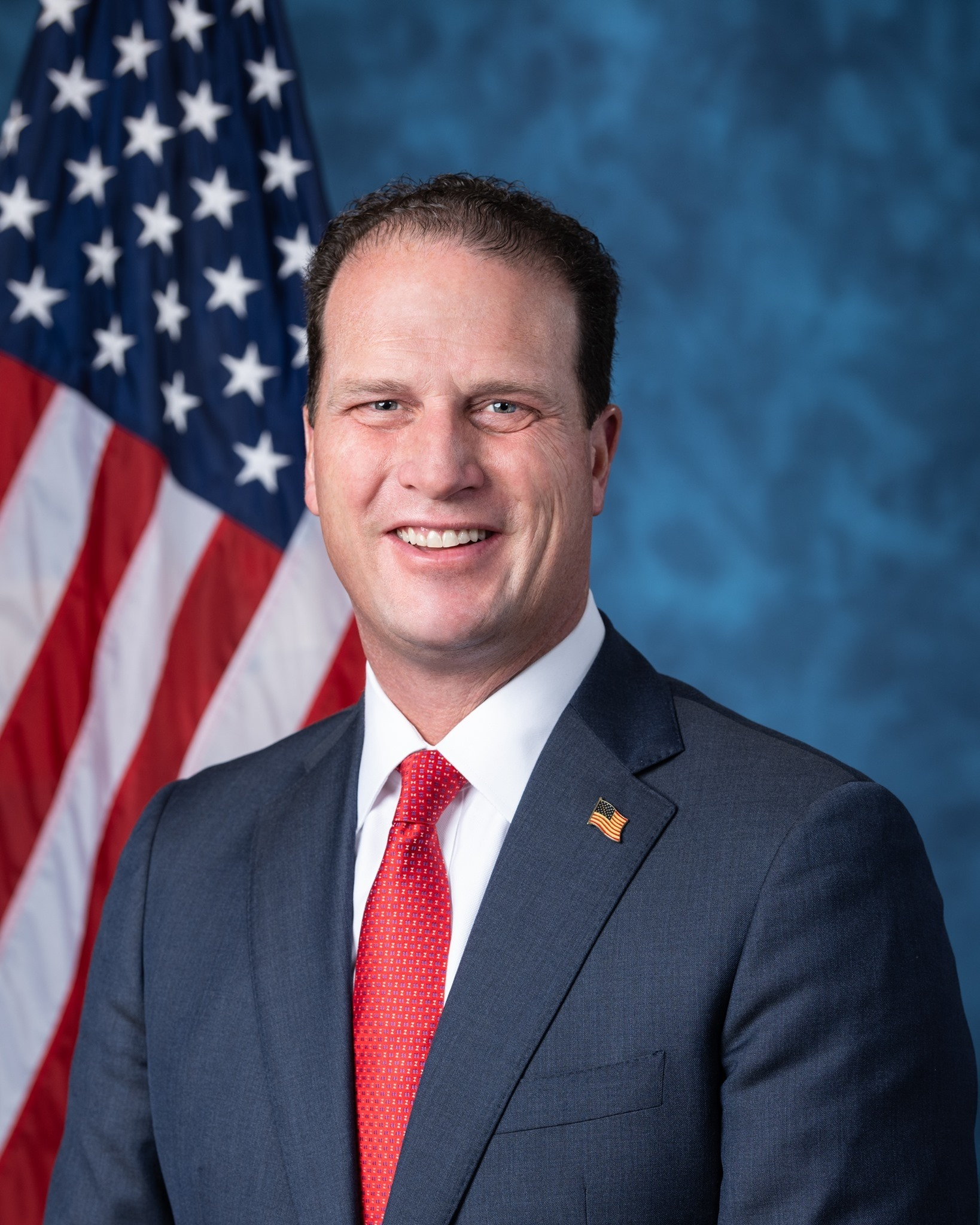
- Official portrait, 2020

Chair of the Republican Study Committee
- Incumbent
- Assumed office January 3, 2025
- Preceded by: Kevin Hern

Member of the U.S. House of Representatives from Texas's 11th district
- Incumbent
- Assumed office January 3, 2021
- Preceded by: Mike Conaway

Personal details
- Born: August Lee Pfluger; December 28, 1977 (age 48) Harris County, Texas, U.S.
- Party: Republican
- Spouse: Camille Cole
- Children: 3
- Education: United States Air Force Academy (BS); Embry-Riddle Aeronautical University, Daytona Beach (MS); Air University (MS); Georgetown University (MS)
- Website: House website Campaign website

Military service
- Allegiance: United States
- Branch/service: United States Air Force
- Years of service: 2000–2020 (active); 2020–present (reserve)
- Rank: Colonel
- Unit: Air Force Reserve
- Commands: 380th Expeditionary Operations Group
- Battles/wars: War on terror; War against the Islamic State
- Awards: Air Medal (with 3 oak leaf clusters)

August Lee Pfluger (/ˈfluːɡər/ FLOO-gər; born December 28, 1977) is an American politician and Air Force officer serving as the U.S. representative for Texas's 11th congressional district since 2021. A member of the Republican Party, his district includes much of West Texas.

== Early life and education ==
Pfluger's four-times-great-grandfather, German immigrant Henry Pfluger Sr. (1803–1867), founded Pflugerville, Texas. His maternal grandfather, a member of the United States Army Air Corps in World War II, inspired Pfluger to become a pilot.

Born in Harris County in 1977, Pfluger attended Central High School in San Angelo, Texas, where he played quarterback for the school's football team. He is an Eagle Scout. He earned a Bachelor of Science degree in political science from the United States Air Force Academy. Pfluger then earned a Master of Science degree in aeronautical science from Embry–Riddle Aeronautical University, a Master of Science in military and operations science from Air University, and a Master of Science in international business and policy from Georgetown University.

== Military service ==
Pfluger earned his commission to the United States Air Force in 2000. He served in active duty for 20 years, flying the Northrop T-38 Talon, F-15C Eagle and F-22A Raptor aircraft, He commanded 380th Expeditionary Operations Group in Al Dhafra Air Base He then deployed in Syria and Northern Iraq. During his service Pfluger earned several medal and awards including Meritorious Service Medal with three oak leaf clusters, Air Medal with one oak leaf cluster and Air Force Commendation Medal with one oak leaf cluster. He completed 2,000 hours including over 300 combat hours and was progressively promoted to the rank of colonel.

Pfluger later briefly served on the United States National Security Council (NSC) during Donald Trump's first presidency. He remained in the Air Force Reserve after leaving active duty. He also appeared briefly in the Fighter Pilot: Operation Red Flag IMAX film in 2004.

== U.S. House of Representatives ==
=== Elections ===
==== 2020 ====
Pfluger resigned from the NSC after three months to run for the United States House of Representatives for Texas's 11th congressional district. Representative Mike Conaway, who had represented the district since its creation in 2005, was retiring after eight terms. Pfluger cleared 50% of the vote in a crowded 10-way Republican Party primary, enough to win the nomination in a single round. He faced Democratic nominee Jon Mark Hogg and Libertarian Wacey Alpha Cody in the November general election. However, with Republicans having a nearly 10-to-1 registration advantage in the district, Pfluger was heavily favored to win in November. Indeed, Hogg was only the fifth Democrat to run in the district since its creation in 2005.

As expected, Pfluger easily defeated Hogg in the general election.

==== 2022 ====
Pfluger ran unopposed, winning a second term.

==== 2024 ====
Pfluger ran unopposed again, winning a third term.

=== Tenure ===
Pfluger took office on January 3, 2021. On January 6, the day of the storming of the United States Capitol, he and 146 of his fellow congressional Republicans voted to block certification of President-elect Joe Biden's 2020 victory, as part of the Trump-led effort to overturn the 2020 United States presidential election. Specifically, he voted against certifying Arizona's and Pennsylvania's electoral votes.

In August 2021, Business Insider reported that Pfluger had violated the Stop Trading on Congressional Knowledge (STOCK) Act of 2012, a federal transparency and conflict-of-interest law, by failing to properly disclose stock trades made by him or his wife worth between $10,007 and $150,000.

On July 18, 2023, he proposed a congressional non-binding resolution which stated that “the State of Israel is not a racist or apartheid state", that Congress rejects "all forms of antisemitism and xenophobia" and that “the United States will always be a staunch partner and supporter of Israel." It passed with support from 217 Republicans and 195 Democrats.

In March 2024, Pfluger, Representative Don Davis, and a news reporter wrote an opinion piece in the Washington Examiner. The piece criticized the push by many members of Congress to condition U.S. aid to Israel.

=== Committee assignments ===
- Committee on Homeland Security
- Committee on Foreign Affairs
- Committee on Energy and Commerce

=== Caucus membership ===
- Congressional Ukraine Caucus
- Republican Study Committee
- Congressional Western Caucus

== Personal life ==
Pfluger and his wife Camille have three young daughters. They live in San Angelo, Texas. His brother Karl is the president of an oil and energy company in Midland, Texas, and an investor in Truth Social.

U.S. House of Representatives
| Preceded by Mike Conaway | Member of the U.S. House of Representatives from Texas's 11th congressional district 2021–present | Incumbent |
Party political offices
| Preceded by Kevin Hern | Chair of the Republican Study Committee; 2025–present | Incumbent |
U.S. order of precedence (ceremonial)
| Preceded by Burgess Owens | United States representatives by seniority 272nd | Succeeded by Deborah Ross |
