= Electoral history of Lloyd Bentsen =

Elections featuring American politician

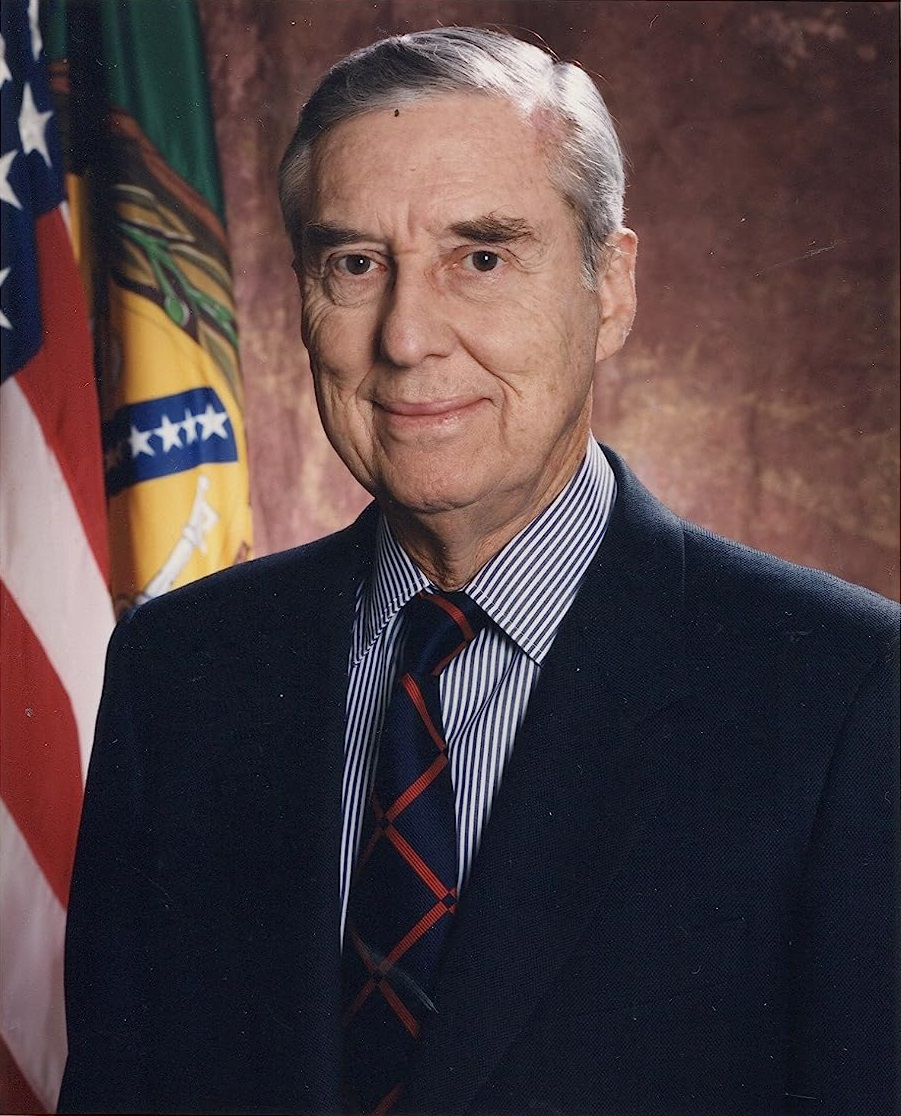

Electoral history of Lloyd Bentsen, United States Senator from Texas (1971-1993), United States Representative (1948-1955), United States Secretary of the Treasury (1993-1994), Democratic Party nominee for Vice President of the United States in 1988 and a candidate for 1976 Democratic presidential nomination

Texas's 15th congressional district, 1948 (regular):

- Lloyd Bentsen (D) - 27,402 (100.00%)

Texas's 15th congressional district, 1948 (special):

- Lloyd Bentsen (D) - 2,396 (100.00%)

Texas's 15th congressional district, 1950:

- Lloyd Bentsen (D) (inc.) - 18,524 (100.00%)

Texas's 15th congressional district, 1952:

- Lloyd Bentsen (D) (inc.) - 63,723 (100.00%)

Democratic primary for the United States Senate (Class 1 seat) from Texas, 1970:

- Lloyd Bentsen - 841,316 (53.66%)
- Ralph Yarborough (inc.) - 726,477 (46.34%)

United States Senate election in Texas, 1970:

- Lloyd Bentsen (D) - 1,194,069 (53.55%)
- George H. W. Bush (R) - 1,035,794 (46.45%)

Democratic primary for the United States Senate (Class 1 seat) from Texas, 1976:

- Lloyd Bentsen (inc.) - 970,983 (63.66%)
- Phil Gramm - 427,597 (28.04%)
- Hugh Wilson - 107,150 (7.03%)
- Leon Dugi - 19,455 (1.28%)

Texas Democratic presidential primary, 1976:

- Jimmy Carter - 736,161 (47.65%)
- Lloyd Bentsen - 343,032 (22.20%)
- George Wallace - 270,798 (17.53%)
- Uncommitted - 129,478 (8.38%)
- Fred R. Harris - 31,379 (2.03%)
- Sargent Shriver - 28,520 (1.85%)
- Ellen McCormack - 5,700 (0.37%)

United States Senate election in Texas, 1976:

- Lloyd Bentsen (D) (inc.) - 2,199,956 (56.78%)
- Alan Steelman (R) - 1,636,370 (42.24%)
- Pedro Vasquez (Socialist Workers) - 20,549 (0.53%)
- Marjorie P. Gallion (American Independent) - 17,355 (0.45%)

Democratic primary for the United States Senate (Class 1 seat) from Texas, 1982:

- Lloyd Bentsen (inc.) - 987,153 (78.13%)
- Joe Sullivan - 276,314 (21.87%)

United States Senate election in Texas, 1982:

- Lloyd Bentsen (D) (inc.) - 1,818,223 (58.59%)
- James Collins (R) - 1,256,759 (40.50%)
- John E. Ford (LBT) - 23,494 (0.76%)
- Lineaus Hooper Lorette (Citizens) - 4,564 (0.15%)
- Write-in - 127 (0.00%)

Democratic primary for the United States Senate (Class 1 seat) from Texas, 1988:

- Lloyd Bentsen (inc.) - 1,365,736 (84.80%)
- Joe Sullivan - 244,805 (15.20%)

1988 Democratic National Convention (presidential tally):

- Michael Dukakis - 2,877 (70.09%)
- Jesse Jackson - 1,219 (29.70%)
- Richard H. Stallings - 3 (0.07%)
- Joe Biden - 2 (0.05%)
- Dick Gephardt - 2 (0.05%)
- Lloyd Bentsen - 1 (0.02%)
- Gary Hart - 1 (0.02%)

1988 Democratic National Convention (vice presidential tally):

- Lloyd Bentsen - 4,148 (100.00%)

United States Senate election in Texas, 1988:

- Lloyd Bentsen (D) (inc.) - 3,149,806 (59.17%)
- Beau Boulter (R) - 2,129,228 (40.00%)
- Jeff Daiell (LBT) - 43,989 (0.83%)
- Write-in - 583 (0.01%)

1988 United States presidential election:

- George H. W. Bush/Dan Quayle (R) - 48,886,597 (53.4%) and 426 electoral votes (40 states carried)
- Michael Dukakis/Lloyd Bentsen (D) - 41,809,476 (45.6%) and 111 electoral votes (10 states and D.C. carried)
- Lloyd Bentsen/Michael Dukakis (D) - 1 electoral vote (West Virginia faithless elector)
- Ron Paul/Andre Marrou (LBT) - 431,750 (0.5%)
- Lenora Fulani (New Alliance) - 217,221 (0.2%)
- Others - 249,642 (0.4%)
