= Texas's 15th congressional district =

U.S. House district for Texas

Coordinates: 27°45′00″N 98°15′48″W

- Interactive map of district boundaries
- Representative: Monica De La Cruz; R–Edinburg
- Distribution: 86.67% urban; 13.33% rural
- Population (2025): 825,547
- Median household income: $63,444
- Ethnicity: 81.4% Hispanic; 15.3% White; 1.1% Asian; 1.0% Black; 0.8% Two or more races; 0.4% other
- Cook PVI: R+7

Texas's 15th congressional district of the United States House of Representatives includes a thin section of the far south of the state of Texas. The district's current Representative is Republican Monica De La Cruz. Elected in 2022, De La Cruz is the first Republican and woman to represent the district.

Currently, the 15th congressional district composes of a narrow strip of land running from western Hidalgo County in the Rio Grande Valley northwards to eastern Guadalupe County, to the east of San Antonio. The district includes the entirety of Brooks, Jim Wells, Live Oak, Karnes, and Wilson counties between Hidalgo and Guadalupe counties.

The district has generally given its congressperson very long tenures in Washington; only eight people, seven Democrats and one Republican, have ever represented it. The district's best-known Representative was John Nance Garner, who represented the district from its creation in 1903 until 1933, and was Speaker of the House from 1931 to 1933. He ran with Franklin D. Roosevelt in the 1932 and 1936 presidential campaigns, and was elected Vice President of the United States, serving from 1933 to 1941. The district was one of the first Latino-majority districts in the country, and has been represented by Latino representatives since 1965.

Notably, this district narrowly voted more Republican in the House elections than the nation as a whole in 2020. Vicente Gonzalez won by 2.9 points while Democrats won the national vote by a combined 3.1 percentage points. It also voted more Republican than the national average while voting Democratic in the 2020 United States presidential election, and the difference between the national vote and the result was wider in the presidential election than the House. Due to redistricting, incumbent Gonzalez in the 2022 election ran in the 34th congressional district. The Republican nominee, former insurance agent Monica De La Cruz defeated the Democratic nominee, businesswoman Michelle Vallejo.

== Recent election results from statewide races ==
=== 2023–2027 boundaries ===
Year	Office	Results
2008	President	Obama 56% - 43%
2012	President	Obama 56% - 44%
2014	Senate	Cornyn 53% - 47%
2014	Governor	Abbott 50.1% - 49.9%
2016	President	Clinton 55% - 42%
2018	Senate	O'Rourke 56% - 44%
2018	Governor	Valdez 50% - 49%
2018	Lt. Governor	Collier 54% - 44%
2018	Attorney General	Nelson 55% - 43%
2018	Comptroller of Public Accounts	Chevalier 52% - 44%
2020	President	Trump 51% - 48%
2020	Senate	Cornyn 51% - 46%
2022	Governor	Abbott 52% - 46%
2022	Lt. Governor	Patrick 52% - 45%
2022	Attorney General	Paxton 51% - 47%
2022	Comptroller of Public Accounts	Hegar 52% - 44%
2024	President	Trump 58% - 41%
2024	Senate	Cruz 54% - 44%

=== 2027–2033 boundaries ===
Year	Office	Results
2008	President	Obama 56% - 43%
2012	President	Obama 57% - 43%
2014	Senate	Cornyn 50.1% - 49.9%
2014	Governor	Davis 52% - 48%
2016	President	Clinton 55% - 41%
2018	Senate	O'Rourke 55% - 44%
2018	Governor	Abbott 50% - 49%
2018	Lt. Governor	Collier 54% - 44%
2018	Attorney General	Nelson 55% - 43%
2018	Comptroller of Public Accounts	Chevalier 52% - 44%
2020	President	Trump 51% - 48%
2020	Senate	Cornyn 50% - 46%
2022	Governor	Abbott 52% - 46%
2022	Lt. Governor	Patrick 53% - 45%
2022	Attorney General	Paxton 51% - 47%
2022	Comptroller of Public Accounts	Hegar 52% - 44%
2024	President	Trump 59% - 41%
2024	Senate	Cruz 54% - 44%
2026	Senate	Talarico 60% - 37%
2026	Governor	Hinojosa 59% - 40%

== Current composition ==
For the 118th and successive Congresses (based on redistricting following the 2020 census), the district contains all or portions of the following counties and communities:

Brooks County (5)

All 5 communities

Guadalupe County (16)

Geronimo, Kingsbury, New Braunfels (part; also 28th; shared with Comal County), Redwood, Staples, Seguin (part; also 28th)

Hidalgo County (34)

Abram, Alton, César Chavez, Citrus City, Cuevitas, Doffing, Doolittle, Edinburg (part; also 34th), Granjeno, Harding Gill Tract, Hargill, Havana, Hidalgo, La Blanca, La Coma Heights, La Homa, La Joya, Linn, Los Ebanos, McAllen (part; also 34th), Mission, Monte Alto, Palmhurst, Palmview, Palmview South, Peñitas, Perezville, Pharr, Salida del Sol Estates, San Carlos (part; also 34th), San Juan (part; also 34th), South Alamo, Sullivan City, West Sharyland

Jim Wells County (17)

All 17 communities

Karnes County (4)

All 4 communities

Live Oak County (2)

George West, Three Rivers

Wilson County (4)

All 4 communities

== Future composition ==
Beginning with the 2026 election, the 15 district will consist of the following counties:

- Aransas (part)
- Bee
- Brooks
- DeWitt
- Goliad
- Gonzales
- Hidalgo (part)
- Jim Wells
- Lavaca
- Refugio (part)
- San Patricio (part)

== List of members representing the district ==
Member	Party	Years	Cong ress	Electoral history	Counties
District established March 4, 1903
John N. Garner (Uvalde)	Democratic	March 4, 1903 – March 3, 1933	58th 59th 60th 61st 62nd 63rd 64th 65th 66th 67th 68th 69th 70th 71st 72nd	Elected in 1902. Re-elected in 1904. Re-elected in 1906. Re-elected in 1908. Re-elected in 1910. Re-elected in 1912. Re-elected in 1914. Re-elected in 1916. Re-elected in 1918. Re-elected in 1920. Re-elected in 1922. Re-elected in 1924. Re-elected in 1926. Re-elected in 1928. Re-elected in 1930. Re-elected in 1932. Resigned to become Vice President of the United States.	1903–1911 [data missing]
John N. Garner (Uvalde)	Democratic	March 4, 1903 – March 3, 1933	58th 59th 60th 61st 62nd 63rd 64th 65th 66th 67th 68th 69th 70th 71st 72nd	Elected in 1902. Re-elected in 1904. Re-elected in 1906. Re-elected in 1908. Re-elected in 1910. Re-elected in 1912. Re-elected in 1914. Re-elected in 1916. Re-elected in 1918. Re-elected in 1920. Re-elected in 1922. Re-elected in 1924. Re-elected in 1926. Re-elected in 1928. Re-elected in 1930. Re-elected in 1932. Resigned to become Vice President of the United States.	1911–1919 [data missing]
John N. Garner (Uvalde)	Democratic	March 4, 1903 – March 3, 1933	58th 59th 60th 61st 62nd 63rd 64th 65th 66th 67th 68th 69th 70th 71st 72nd	Elected in 1902. Re-elected in 1904. Re-elected in 1906. Re-elected in 1908. Re-elected in 1910. Re-elected in 1912. Re-elected in 1914. Re-elected in 1916. Re-elected in 1918. Re-elected in 1920. Re-elected in 1922. Re-elected in 1924. Re-elected in 1926. Re-elected in 1928. Re-elected in 1930. Re-elected in 1932. Resigned to become Vice President of the United States.	1919–1935 [data missing]
Vacant		March 4, 1933 – April 23, 1933	73rd		1919–1935 [data missing]
Milton H. West (Brownsville)	Democratic	April 23, 1933 – October 28, 1948	73rd 74th 75th 76th 77th 78th 79th 80th	Elected to finish Garner's term. Re-elected in 1934. Re-elected in 1936. Re-elected in 1938. Re-elected in 1940. Re-elected in 1942. Re-elected in 1944. Re-elected in 1946. Died.	1919–1935 [data missing]
Milton H. West (Brownsville)	Democratic	April 23, 1933 – October 28, 1948	73rd 74th 75th 76th 77th 78th 79th 80th	Elected to finish Garner's term. Re-elected in 1934. Re-elected in 1936. Re-elected in 1938. Re-elected in 1940. Re-elected in 1942. Re-elected in 1944. Re-elected in 1946. Died.	1935–1959 [data missing]
Vacant		October 28, 1948 – December 4, 1948	80th		1935–1959 [data missing]
Lloyd Bentsen (McAllen)	Democratic	December 4, 1948 – January 3, 1955	80th 81st 82nd 83rd	Elected to finish West's term. Re-elected in 1948. Re-elected in 1950. Re-elected in 1952. Retired.	1935–1959 [data missing]
Joe M. Kilgore (McAllen)	Democratic	January 3, 1955 – January 3, 1965	84th 85th 86th 87th 88th	Elected in 1954. Re-elected in 1956. Re-elected in 1958. Re-elected in 1960. Re-elected in 1962. Retired.	1935–1959 [data missing]
Joe M. Kilgore (McAllen)	Democratic	January 3, 1955 – January 3, 1965	84th 85th 86th 87th 88th	Elected in 1954. Re-elected in 1956. Re-elected in 1958. Re-elected in 1960. Re-elected in 1962. Retired.	1959–1967 [data missing]
Kika de la Garza (McAllen)	Democratic	January 3, 1965 – January 3, 1997	89th 90th 91st 92nd 93rd 94th 95th 96th 97th 98th 99th 100th 101st 102nd 103rd 104th	Elected in 1964. Re-elected in 1966. Re-elected in 1968. Re-elected in 1970. Re-elected in 1972. Re-elected in 1974. Re-elected in 1976. Re-elected in 1978. Re-elected in 1980. Re-elected in 1982. Re-elected in 1984. Re-elected in 1986. Re-elected in 1988. Re-elected in 1990. Re-elected in 1992. Re-elected in 1994. Retired.	1959–1967 [data missing]
Kika de la Garza (McAllen)	Democratic	January 3, 1965 – January 3, 1997	89th 90th 91st 92nd 93rd 94th 95th 96th 97th 98th 99th 100th 101st 102nd 103rd 104th	Elected in 1964. Re-elected in 1966. Re-elected in 1968. Re-elected in 1970. Re-elected in 1972. Re-elected in 1974. Re-elected in 1976. Re-elected in 1978. Re-elected in 1980. Re-elected in 1982. Re-elected in 1984. Re-elected in 1986. Re-elected in 1988. Re-elected in 1990. Re-elected in 1992. Re-elected in 1994. Retired.	1967–1969 [data missing]
Kika de la Garza (McAllen)	Democratic	January 3, 1965 – January 3, 1997	89th 90th 91st 92nd 93rd 94th 95th 96th 97th 98th 99th 100th 101st 102nd 103rd 104th	Elected in 1964. Re-elected in 1966. Re-elected in 1968. Re-elected in 1970. Re-elected in 1972. Re-elected in 1974. Re-elected in 1976. Re-elected in 1978. Re-elected in 1980. Re-elected in 1982. Re-elected in 1984. Re-elected in 1986. Re-elected in 1988. Re-elected in 1990. Re-elected in 1992. Re-elected in 1994. Retired.	1969–1973 [data missing]
Kika de la Garza (McAllen)	Democratic	January 3, 1965 – January 3, 1997	89th 90th 91st 92nd 93rd 94th 95th 96th 97th 98th 99th 100th 101st 102nd 103rd 104th	Elected in 1964. Re-elected in 1966. Re-elected in 1968. Re-elected in 1970. Re-elected in 1972. Re-elected in 1974. Re-elected in 1976. Re-elected in 1978. Re-elected in 1980. Re-elected in 1982. Re-elected in 1984. Re-elected in 1986. Re-elected in 1988. Re-elected in 1990. Re-elected in 1992. Re-elected in 1994. Retired.	1973–1975 [data missing]
Kika de la Garza (McAllen)	Democratic	January 3, 1965 – January 3, 1997	89th 90th 91st 92nd 93rd 94th 95th 96th 97th 98th 99th 100th 101st 102nd 103rd 104th	Elected in 1964. Re-elected in 1966. Re-elected in 1968. Re-elected in 1970. Re-elected in 1972. Re-elected in 1974. Re-elected in 1976. Re-elected in 1978. Re-elected in 1980. Re-elected in 1982. Re-elected in 1984. Re-elected in 1986. Re-elected in 1988. Re-elected in 1990. Re-elected in 1992. Re-elected in 1994. Retired.	1975–1983 [data missing]
Kika de la Garza (McAllen)	Democratic	January 3, 1965 – January 3, 1997	89th 90th 91st 92nd 93rd 94th 95th 96th 97th 98th 99th 100th 101st 102nd 103rd 104th	Elected in 1964. Re-elected in 1966. Re-elected in 1968. Re-elected in 1970. Re-elected in 1972. Re-elected in 1974. Re-elected in 1976. Re-elected in 1978. Re-elected in 1980. Re-elected in 1982. Re-elected in 1984. Re-elected in 1986. Re-elected in 1988. Re-elected in 1990. Re-elected in 1992. Re-elected in 1994. Retired.	1983–1985 [data missing]
Kika de la Garza (McAllen)	Democratic	January 3, 1965 – January 3, 1997	89th 90th 91st 92nd 93rd 94th 95th 96th 97th 98th 99th 100th 101st 102nd 103rd 104th	Elected in 1964. Re-elected in 1966. Re-elected in 1968. Re-elected in 1970. Re-elected in 1972. Re-elected in 1974. Re-elected in 1976. Re-elected in 1978. Re-elected in 1980. Re-elected in 1982. Re-elected in 1984. Re-elected in 1986. Re-elected in 1988. Re-elected in 1990. Re-elected in 1992. Re-elected in 1994. Retired.	1985–1993 [data missing]
Kika de la Garza (McAllen)	Democratic	January 3, 1965 – January 3, 1997	89th 90th 91st 92nd 93rd 94th 95th 96th 97th 98th 99th 100th 101st 102nd 103rd 104th	Elected in 1964. Re-elected in 1966. Re-elected in 1968. Re-elected in 1970. Re-elected in 1972. Re-elected in 1974. Re-elected in 1976. Re-elected in 1978. Re-elected in 1980. Re-elected in 1982. Re-elected in 1984. Re-elected in 1986. Re-elected in 1988. Re-elected in 1990. Re-elected in 1992. Re-elected in 1994. Retired.	1993–2003; Bee, Brooks, De Witt, Goliad, Hidalgo, Jim Wells, Karnes, Kleberg, Live Oak, San Patricio, and Willacy
Rubén Hinojosa (Mercedes)	Democratic	January 3, 1997 – January 3, 2017	105th 106th 107th 108th 109th 110th 111th 112th 113th 114th	Elected in 1996. Re-elected in 1998. Re-elected in 2000. Re-elected in 2002. Re-elected in 2004. Re-elected in 2006. Re-elected in 2008. Re-elected in 2010. Re-elected in 2012. Re-elected in 2014. Retired.	1993–2003; Bee, Brooks, De Witt, Goliad, Hidalgo, Jim Wells, Karnes, Kleberg, Live Oak, San Patricio, and Willacy
Rubén Hinojosa (Mercedes)	Democratic	January 3, 1997 – January 3, 2017	105th 106th 107th 108th 109th 110th 111th 112th 113th 114th	Elected in 1996. Re-elected in 1998. Re-elected in 2000. Re-elected in 2002. Re-elected in 2004. Re-elected in 2006. Re-elected in 2008. Re-elected in 2010. Re-elected in 2012. Re-elected in 2014. Retired.	2003–2005; Bee, Brooks, Goliad, Hidalgo, Kleberg, Live Oak, Nueces, and San Patricio
Rubén Hinojosa (Mercedes)	Democratic	January 3, 1997 – January 3, 2017	105th 106th 107th 108th 109th 110th 111th 112th 113th 114th	Elected in 1996. Re-elected in 1998. Re-elected in 2000. Re-elected in 2002. Re-elected in 2004. Re-elected in 2006. Re-elected in 2008. Re-elected in 2010. Re-elected in 2012. Re-elected in 2014. Retired.	2005–2007 Bastrop, Bee, Brooks, Cameron, Colorado, De Witt, Fayette, Goliad, Hidalgo, Jim Wells, Lavaca, Refugio, and San Patricio
Rubén Hinojosa (Mercedes)	Democratic	January 3, 1997 – January 3, 2017	105th 106th 107th 108th 109th 110th 111th 112th 113th 114th	Elected in 1996. Re-elected in 1998. Re-elected in 2000. Re-elected in 2002. Re-elected in 2004. Re-elected in 2006. Re-elected in 2008. Re-elected in 2010. Re-elected in 2012. Re-elected in 2014. Retired.	2007–2013 Bee, Brooks, Cameron, De Witt, Duval, Goliad, Hidalgo, Jim Wells, Karnes, Live Oak, Refugio, and San Patricio
Rubén Hinojosa (Mercedes)	Democratic	January 3, 1997 – January 3, 2017	105th 106th 107th 108th 109th 110th 111th 112th 113th 114th	Elected in 1996. Re-elected in 1998. Re-elected in 2000. Re-elected in 2002. Re-elected in 2004. Re-elected in 2006. Re-elected in 2008. Re-elected in 2010. Re-elected in 2012. Re-elected in 2014. Retired.	2013–2023 Brooks, Duval, Guadalupe (part), Hidalgo (part), Jim Hogg, Karnes, Live Oak, and Wilson (part)
Vicente Gonzalez (McAllen)	Democratic	January 3, 2017 – January 3, 2023	115th 116th 117th	Elected in 2016. Re-elected in 2018. Re-elected in 2020. Redistricted to the 34th district.	2013–2023 Brooks, Duval, Guadalupe (part), Hidalgo (part), Jim Hogg, Karnes, Live Oak, and Wilson (part)
Monica De La Cruz (Edinburg)	Republican	January 3, 2023 – present	118th 119th	Elected in 2022. Re-elected in 2024. Lost re-election.	2023–2027 Brooks, Guadalupe (part), Hidalgo (part), Jim Wells, Karnes, Live Oak, and Wilson
Bobby Pulido (Edinburg)	Democratic	Assuming office on January 3, 2027		Elected in 2026.	2027–present Aransas (part), Bee, Brooks, DeWitt, Goliad, Gonzales, Hidalgo (part), Jim Wells, Lavaca, Refugio (part), and San Patricio (part)

== Election results ==
=== 1920 ===
1920 United States House of Representatives elections
Party	Candidate	Votes	%
Democratic	John N. Garner (incumbent)	10,265	100.00
Total votes		10,265	100.0
Turnout			
Democratic hold			

=== 1922 ===
1922 United States House of Representatives elections
Party	Candidate	Votes	%
Democratic	John N. Garner (incumbent)	14,366	100.00
Total votes		14,366	100.0
Turnout			
Democratic hold			

=== 1924 ===
1924 United States House of Representatives elections
Party	Candidate	Votes	%
Democratic	John N. Garner (incumbent)	22,776	100.00
Total votes		22,776	100.0
Turnout			
Democratic hold			

=== 1926 ===
1926 United States House of Representatives elections
Party	Candidate	Votes	%
Democratic	John N. Garner (Incumbent)	13,548	82.75
Republican	Hardie F. Jefferies	2,823	17.25
Total votes		16,371	100.0
Turnout			
Democratic hold			

=== 1928 ===
1928 United States House of Representatives elections
Party	Candidate	Votes	%
Democratic	John N. Garner (Incumbent)	28,417	99.99
Independent	J.L. Burd	1	0.003
Total votes		28,418	100.0
Turnout			
Democratic hold			

=== 1930 ===
1930 United States House of Representatives elections
Party	Candidate	Votes	%
Democratic	John N. Garner (Incumbent)	20,733	77.50
Republican	Carlos G. Watson	6,016	22.50
Total votes		26,749	100.0
Turnout			
Democratic hold			

=== 1932 ===
1932 United States House of Representatives elections
Party	Candidate	Votes	%
Democratic	John N. Garner (Incumbent)	44,318	85.75
Republican	Carlos G. Watson	7,362	14.25
Total votes		51,680	100.0
Turnout			
Democratic hold			

=== 1933 (Special) ===
1933 Texas's 15th congressional district special election
Party	Candidate	Votes	%
Democratic	Milton H. West	13,546	91.20
Republican	Carlos G. Watson	1,302	8.80
Total votes		14,848	100.0
Turnout			
Democratic hold			

=== 1934 ===
1934 United States House of Representatives elections
Party	Candidate	Votes	%
Democratic	Milton H. West (Incumbent)	20,102	100.00
Total votes		20,102	100.0
Turnout			
Democratic hold			

=== 1936 ===
1936 United States House of Representatives elections
Party	Candidate	Votes	%
Democratic	Milton H. West (Incumbent)	29,508	82.53
Independent	J.A. Simpson	6,244	17.47
Total votes		35,752	100.0
Turnout			
Democratic hold			

=== 1938 ===
1938 United States House of Representatives elections
Party	Candidate	Votes	%
Democratic	Milton H. West (Incumbent)	18,558	99.99
Other write-in votes	Write-in votes	2	0.010
Total votes		18,560	100.0
Turnout			
Democratic hold			

=== 1940 ===
1940 United States House of Representatives elections
Party	Candidate	Votes	%
Democratic	Milton H. West (Incumbent)	31,800	92.36
Republican	J.A. Simpson	2,628	7.64
Total votes		34,428	100.0
Turnout			
Democratic hold			

=== 1942 ===
1942 United States House of Representatives elections
Party	Candidate	Votes	%
Democratic	Milton H. West (Incumbent)	12,169	100.00
Total votes		12,169	100.0
Turnout			
Democratic hold			

=== 1944 ===
1944 United States House of Representatives elections
Party	Candidate	Votes	%
Democratic	Milton H. West (Incumbent)	36,362	99.98
Other write-in votes	Write-in votes	5	0.013
Total votes		36,367	100.0
Turnout			
Democratic hold			

=== 1946 ===
1946 United States House of Representatives elections
Party	Candidate	Votes	%
Democratic	Milton H. West (Incumbent)	14,623	99.98
Other write-in votes	Write-in votes	3	0.020
Total votes		14,626	100.0
Turnout			
Democratic hold			

=== 1948 (Special) ===
1948 Texas's 15th congressional district special election
Party	Candidate	Votes	%
Democratic	Lloyd Bentsen	2,396	100.00
Other write-in votes	Charles McNelly	1	0.00
Total votes		2,397	100.0
Turnout			
Democratic hold			

=== 1948 ===
1948 United States House of Representatives elections
Party	Candidate	Votes	%
Democratic	Lloyd Bentsen (Incumbent)	27,402	100.00
Total votes		27,402	100.0
Turnout			
Democratic hold			

=== 1950 ===
1950 United States House of Representatives elections
Party	Candidate	Votes	%
Democratic	Lloyd Bentsen (Incumbent)	18,524	100.00
Total votes		18,524	100.0
Turnout			
Democratic hold			

=== 1952 ===
1952 United States House of Representatives elections
Party	Candidate	Votes	%
Democratic	Lloyd Bentsen (Incumbent)	63,767	100.00
Total votes		63,767	100.0
Turnout			
Democratic hold			

=== 1954 ===
1954 United States House of Representatives elections
Party	Candidate	Votes	%
Democratic	Joe M. Kilgore	29,113	100.00
Total votes		29,113	100.0
Turnout			
Democratic hold			

=== 1956 ===
1956 United States House of Representatives elections
Party	Candidate	Votes	%
Democratic	Joe M. Kilgore (Incumbent)	64,011	100.00
Total votes		64,011	100.0
Turnout			
Democratic hold			

=== 1958 ===
1958 United States House of Representatives elections
Party	Candidate	Votes	%
Democratic	Joe M. Kilgore (Incumbent)	28,404	100.00
Total votes		28,404	100.0
Turnout			
Democratic hold			

=== 1960 ===
1960 United States House of Representatives elections
Party	Candidate	Votes	%
Democratic	Joe M. Kilgore (Incumbent)	76,421	100.00
Total votes		76,421	100.0
Turnout			
Democratic hold			

=== 1962 ===
1962 United States House of Representatives elections
Party	Candidate	Votes	%
Democratic	Joe M. Kilgore (Incumbent)	53,552	100.00
Total votes		53,552	100.0
Turnout			
Democratic hold			

=== 1964 ===
1964 United States House of Representatives elections
Party	Candidate	Votes	%
Democratic	Kika de la Garza	66,897	69.36
Republican	Joe B. Coulter	29,551	30.64
Total votes		96,448	100.0
Turnout			
Democratic hold			

=== 1966 ===
1966 United States House of Representatives elections
Party	Candidate	Votes	%
Democratic	Kika de la Garza (Incumbent)	33,129	100.00
Total votes		33,129	100.0
Turnout			
Democratic hold			

=== 1968 ===
1968 United States House of Representatives elections
Party	Candidate	Votes	%
Democratic	Kika de la Garza (Incumbent)	57,618	100.00
Total votes		57,618	100.0
Turnout			
Democratic hold			

=== 1970 ===
1970 United States House of Representatives elections
Party	Candidate	Votes	%
Democratic	Kika de la Garza (Incumbent)	54,498	76.16
Republican	Ben A. Martinez	17,049	23.82
Other write-in votes	Write-in votes	1	0.02
Total votes		71,548	100.0
Turnout			
Democratic hold			

=== 1972 ===
1972 United States House of Representatives elections
Party	Candidate	Votes	%
Democratic	Kika de la Garza (Incumbent)	73,994	100.00
Total votes		73,994	100.0
Turnout			
Democratic hold			

=== 1974 ===
1974 United States House of Representatives elections
Party	Candidate	Votes	%
Democratic	Kika de la Garza (Incumbent)	42,567	100.00
Total votes		42,567	100.0
Turnout			
Democratic hold			

=== 1976 ===
1976 United States House of Representatives elections
Party	Candidate	Votes	%
Democratic	Kika de la Garza (Incumbent)	102,837	74.36
Republican	R.L. (Lendy) McDonald	35,446	25.64
Total votes		138,283	100.0
Turnout			
Democratic hold			

=== 1978 ===
1978 United States House of Representatives elections
Party	Candidate	Votes	%
Democratic	Kika de la Garza (Incumbent)	54,560	66.20
Republican	R.L. (Lendy) McDonald	27,853	33.80
Total votes		82,413	100.0
Turnout			
Democratic hold			

=== 1980 ===
1980 United States House of Representatives elections
Party	Candidate	Votes	%
Democratic	Kika de la Garza (Incumbent)	105,325	70.02
Republican	R.L. (Lendy) McDonald	45,090	29.98
Total votes		150,145	100.0
Turnout			
Democratic hold			

=== 1982 ===
1982 United States House of Representatives elections
Party	Candidate	Votes	%
Democratic	Kika de la Garza (Incumbent)	76,544	95.67
Libertarian	Frank L. Jones III	3,458	4.33
Total votes		80,002	100.0
Turnout			
Democratic hold			

=== 1984 ===
1984 United States House of Representatives elections
Party	Candidate	Votes	%
Democratic	Kika de la Garza (Incumbent)	104,863	100.00
Total votes		104,863	100.0
Turnout			
Democratic hold			

=== 1986 ===
1986 United States House of Representatives elections
Party	Candidate	Votes	%
Democratic	Kika de la Garza (Incumbent)	70,077	100.00
Total votes		70,077	100.0
Turnout			
Democratic hold			

=== 1988 ===
1988 United States House of Representatives elections
Party	Candidate	Votes	%
Democratic	Kika de la Garza (Incumbent)	93,672	93.85
Libertarian	Gloria Joyce Hendrix	6,133	6.15
Total votes		99,805	100.0
Turnout			
Democratic hold			

=== 1990 ===
1990 United States House of Representatives elections
Party	Candidate	Votes	%
Democratic	Kika de la Garza (Incumbent)	72,461	100.00
Total votes		138,283	100.0
Turnout			
Democratic hold			

=== 1992 ===
1992 United States House of Representatives elections
Party	Candidate	Votes	%
Democratic	Kika de la Garza (Incumbent)	86,351	60.42
Republican	Tom Haughey	56,549	39.58
Total votes		142,900	100.0
Turnout			
Democratic hold			

=== 1994 ===
1994 United States House of Representatives elections
Party	Candidate	Votes	%
Democratic	Kika de la Garza (Incumbent)	61,527	58.95
Republican	Tom Haughey	41,119	39.39
Independent	John c.c. Hamilton	1,720	1.64
Total votes		104,366	100.0
Turnout			
Democratic hold			

=== 1996 ===
1996 United States House of Representatives elections
Party	Candidate	Votes	%
Democratic	Rubén Hinojosa	86,347	62.28
Republican	Tom Haughey	50,914	36.72
Natural Law	Rob Wofford	1,333	1.00
Total votes		138,621	100.0
Turnout			
Democratic hold			

=== 1998 ===
1998 United States House of Representatives elections
Party	Candidate	Votes	%
Democratic	Rubén Hinojosa (Incumbent)	47,957	58.35
Republican	Tom Haughey	34,221	41.65
Total votes		82,178	100.0
Turnout			
Democratic hold			

=== 2000 ===
2000 United States House of Representatives elections in Texas
Party	Candidate	Votes	%
Democratic	Rubén Hinojosa (Incumbent)	106,570	88.47
Libertarian	Frank Jones	13,167	10.93
Write-in	Israel Cantu	711	0.60
Total votes		120,448	100.0
Turnout			
Democratic hold			

=== 2002 ===
2002 United States House of Representatives elections in Texas
Party	Candidate	Votes	%
Democratic	Rubén Hinojosa (Incumbent)	66,311	100.0
Total votes		66,311	100.0
Turnout			
Democratic hold			

=== 2004 ===
2004 United States House of Representatives elections in Texas
Party	Candidate	Votes	%
Democratic	Rubén Hinojosa (Incumbent)	96,089	57.76
Republican	Michael D. Thamm	67,917	40.82
Libertarian	William R. Cady	2,352	1.41
Total votes		166,358	100.0
Turnout			
Democratic hold			

=== 2006 (Special) ===
2006 United States House of Representatives elections in Texas
Party	Candidate	Votes	%
Democratic	Rubén Hinojosa (Incumbent)	43,236	61.77
Republican	Paul B. Haring	16,601	23.72
Republican	Eddie Zamora	10,150	14.51
Total votes		69,987	100.0
Turnout			
Democratic hold			

=== 2008 ===
2008 United States House of Representatives elections in Texas
Party	Candidate	Votes	%
Democratic	Rubén Hinojosa (Incumbent)	107,578	67.28
Republican	Eddie Zamora	52,303	32.72
Total votes		159,881	100.0
Turnout			
Democratic hold			

=== 2010 ===
2010 United States House of Representatives elections in Texas
Party	Candidate	Votes	%
Democratic	Rubén Hinojosa (Incumbent)	53,546	55.73
Republican	Eddie Zamora	39.964	41.59
Libertarian	Aaron I. Cohn	2,570	2.68
Total votes		96,080	100.0
Turnout			
Democratic hold			

=== 2012 ===
2012 United States House of Representatives elections in Texas
Party	Candidate	Votes	%
Democratic	Rubén Hinojosa (Incumbent)	89,296	60.88
Republican	Dale Brueggemann	54,056	36.85
Libertarian	Ron Finch	3,309	2.27
Total votes		146,661	100.0
Turnout			
Democratic hold			

=== 2014 ===
2014 United States House of Representatives elections in Texas
Party	Candidate	Votes	%
Democratic	Rubén Hinojosa (Incumbent)	48,708	54.01
Republican	Eddie Zamora	39,016	43.26
Libertarian	Johnny Partain	2,460	2.73
Total votes		90,184	100.0
Turnout			
Democratic hold			

=== 2016 ===
2016 United States House of Representatives elections in Texas
Party	Candidate	Votes	%
Democratic	Vicente Gonzalez	101,712	57.31
Republican	Tim Westley	66,877	37.68
Green	Vanessa S. Tijerina	5,448	3.07
Libertarian	Ross Lynn Leone	3,442	1.94
Total votes		177,479	100.0
Democratic hold			

=== 2018 ===
2018 United States House of Representatives elections in Texas
Party	Candidate	Votes	%
Democratic	Vicente Gonzalez (incumbent)	98,333	59.07
Republican	Tim Westley	63,862	38.07
Libertarian	Anthony Cristo	2,607	1.06
Total votes		164,802	100.0
Democratic hold			

=== 2020 ===
2020 United States House of Representatives elections in Texas
Party	Candidate	Votes	%
Democratic	Vicente Gonzalez (incumbent)	115,605	50.05
Republican	Monica De La Cruz	109,017	47.06
Libertarian	Ross Lynn Leone	4,295	1.09
Total votes		228,917	100.0
Democratic hold			

=== 2022 ===
2022 United States House of Representatives elections in Texas
Party	Candidate	Votes	%
Republican	Monica De La Cruz	80,978	53.31
Democratic	Michelle Vallejo	68,097	44.83
Libertarian	Ross Leone	2,814	1.85
Total votes		151,889	100.0
Republican gain from Democratic			

=== 2024 ===
2024 United States House of Representatives elections in Texas
Party	Candidate	Votes	%
Republican	Monica De La Cruz (incumbent)	127,804	57.11
Democratic	Michelle Vallejo	95,965	42.89
Total votes		223,769	100.0
Republican hold			

== Historical district boundaries ==
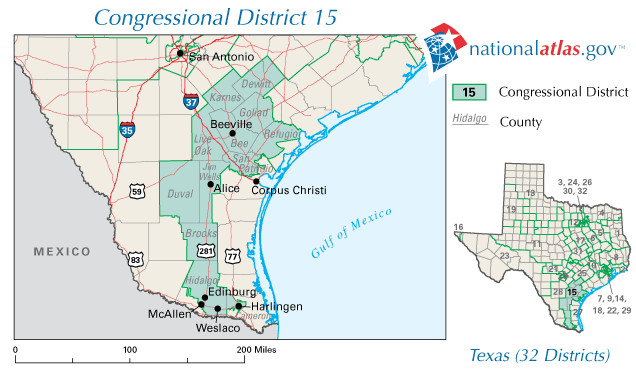
2007–2013

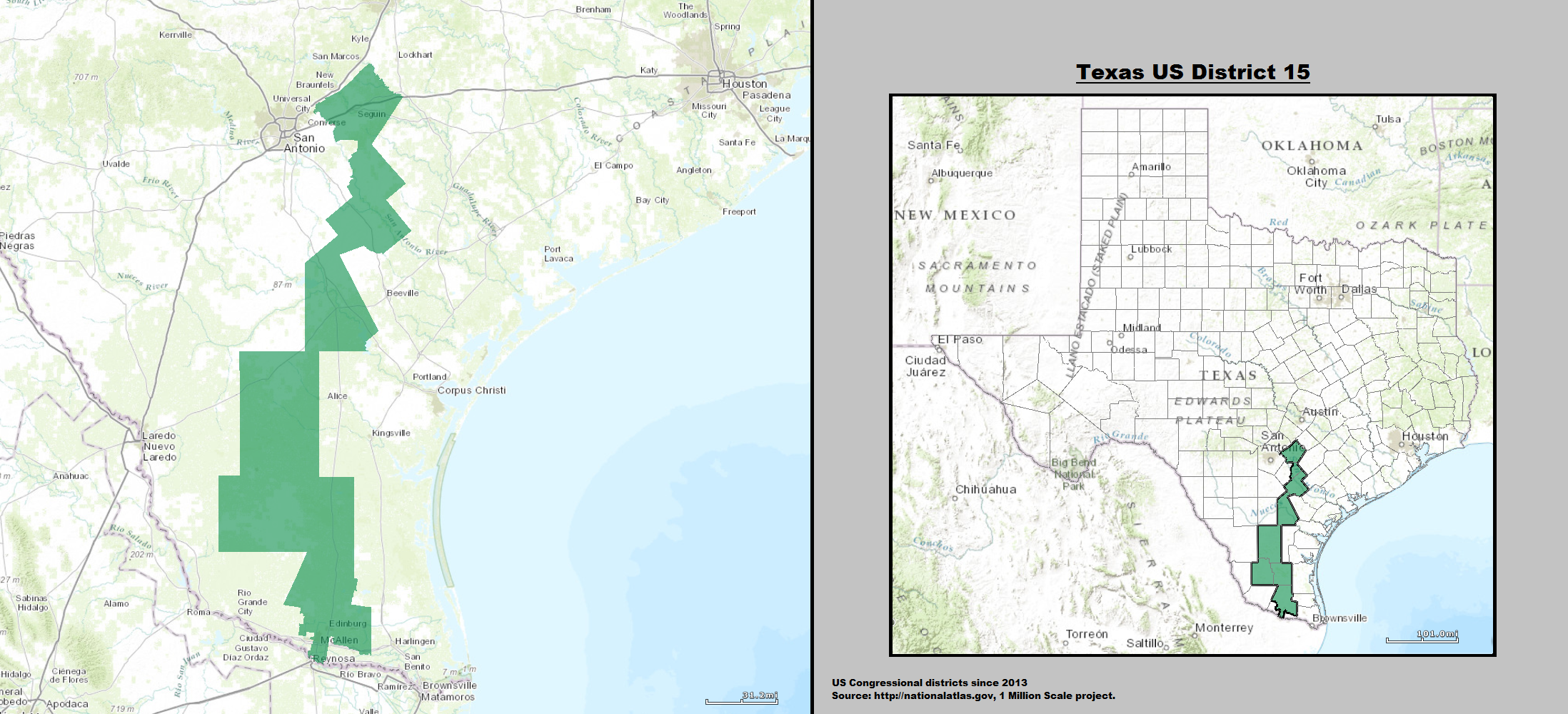
2013–2023

== See also ==
- List of United States congressional districts

U.S. House of Representatives
Preceded by Ohio's 1st congressional district	Home district of the speaker of the U.S. House of Representatives; December 7, 1931 – March 4, 1933	Succeeded by Illinois's 20th congressional district
