= Kika de la Garza =

American politician (1927–2017)

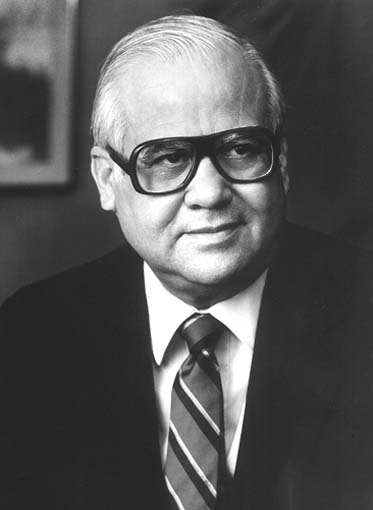

Chair of the House Agriculture Committee
- In office January 3, 1981 – January 3, 1995
- Preceded by: Tom Foley
- Succeeded by: Pat Roberts

Member of the U.S. House of Representatives from Texas's 15th district
- In office January 3, 1965 – January 3, 1997
- Preceded by: Joe M. Kilgore
- Succeeded by: Rubén Hinojosa

Member of the Texas House of Representatives from the 38th district
- In office January 1953 – January 1965
- Preceded by: Constituency established
- Succeeded by: Bud Atwood

Personal details
- Born: Eligio de la Garza II; September 22, 1927 Mercedes, Texas, U.S.
- Died: March 13, 2017 (aged 89) McAllen, Texas, U.S.
- Party: Democratic
- Education: Edinburg Junior College (attended); St. Mary's University, Texas (LLB)

Military service
- Allegiance: United States
- Branch/service: United States Navy; United States Army
- Years of service: 1945–1946 (Navy); 1950–1952 (Army)
- Rank: Second Lieutenant
- Battles/wars: Korean War
- De la Garza's voice De la Garza on the conference report for the 1990 farm bill. Recorded October 23, 1990

Eligio "Kika" de la Garza II (September 22, 1927 – March 13, 2017) was an American lawyer, Korean War veteran, and politician who served 16 consecutive terms as the Democratic representative for the 15th congressional district of Texas from January 3, 1965, to January 3, 1997.

== Early life ==
De la Garza was born on September 22, 1927 and grew up in the city of Mission in Hidalgo County.

At the age of 17, he entered the United States Navy and served for two years. De la Garza chose to continue his education at Edinburg Junior College. Returned to military service in the United States Army Artillery School at Fort Sill in Oklahoma.

=== Korean War ===
For two years beginning in 1952, he was a lieutenant in the Army, serving in the 37th Field Artillery Regiment deployed in the Korean War.

== Legal career ==
After returning home, he completed his law degree at St. Mary's University School of Law in San Antonio.

== Political career ==
=== Texas legislature ===
After practicing law for several years in the Rio Grande Valley, he was elected to the Texas House of Representatives, where he served from 1953 to 1965.

While in the state House, de la Garza was known for sponsoring a large amount of legislation in the fields of education and the environment. He authored bills to protect wetlands, create state-sponsored preschools, and create more international bridges to Mexico. He was the only Hispanic member of the Texas House for the first two years of his tenure, but was joined in 1957 by a second Mexican American member, Oscar M. Laurel of Laredo.

=== Congress ===
In 1964, de la Garza, a strong supporter of U.S. President Lyndon B. Johnson, ran for the United States House of Representatives and won a seat in South Texas. From 1981 to 1994, he was the chairman of the Agriculture Committee, leading the way in passing bills that reorganized the agricultural lending system, the farm insurance system, the United States Department of Agriculture, and pesticide laws. He was also a founding member of the Congressional Hispanic Caucus.

De la Garza voted in favor of the Voting Rights Act of 1965, the Civil Rights Act of 1968, and called for smoother relations between the U.S. and Mexico. He worked to improve trade between the two nations and was critical in passing the legislation that enacted the North American Free Trade Agreement (NAFTA).

== Retirement ==
De la Garza retired from public service in 1997. Upon his return home to Texas, he donated his entire Congressional archive to his alma mater, which had by then been renamed to the University of Texas–Pan American. Currently, the collection is housed at the UTRGV Edinburg Campus library. The archive was unveiled publicly in 2012.

== Death and burial ==
He resided in McAllen, Texas, with his wife Lucille until his death on March 13, 2017, of kidney failure. He is buried at the Valley Memorial Gardens in McAllen.

== See also ==
- List of Hispanic and Latino Americans in the United States Congress

U.S. House of Representatives
| Preceded by Joe M. Kilgore | Member of the U.S. House of Representatives from Texas's 15th congressional district 1965–1997 | Succeeded by Rubén Hinojosa |
| Preceded by Tom Foley | Chair of the House Agriculture Committee; 1981–1995 | Succeeded by Pat Roberts |
| Preceded by Jaime Fuster | Chair of the Congressional Hispanic Caucus; 1989–1990 | Succeeded by Solomon P. Ortiz |
| Preceded by Pat Roberts | Ranking of the House Agriculture Committee; 1995–1997 | Succeeded by Charlie Stenholm |
