= Milton H. West =

American politician (1888–1948)

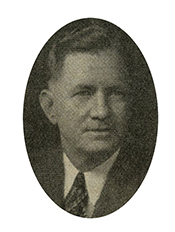

Member of the U.S. House of Representatives from Texas's 15th district
- In office April 23, 1933 – October 28, 1948
- Preceded by: John Nance Garner
- Succeeded by: Lloyd Bentsen

Personal details
- Born: Milton Horace West; June 30, 1888 near Gonzales, Texas
- Died: October 28, 1948 (aged 60) Washington, D.C.
- Resting place: Buena Vista Cemetery, Brownsville, Texas
- Party: Democratic

Milton Horace West (June 30, 1888 – October 28, 1948) was an American lawyer, Texas Ranger and politician who served eight terms as a Democratic member of the United States House of Representatives representing Texas's 15th congressional district from 1933 until his death in 1948.

== Early life ==
Milton Horace West was born on a farm near Gonzales, Texas on June 30, 1888. As a child he attended the local public schools in Gonzales County and later enrolled at West Texas Military Academy in San Antonio, Texas. After graduation West served with the Texas Rangers from 1911 to 1912. In 1915, after being admitted to the Texas state bar, he opened his first legal practice in Floresville, Texas.

== Political career ==
From 1922 to 1925, West served as district attorney for Texas's 28th judicial district and later as assistant district attorney from 1927 to 1930. He won his first public office in 1930 when he was elected to the Texas House of Representatives where he served as a Democrat from 1930 to 1933.

=== Congress ===
In 1933 West became a U.S. Representative when he was elected to replace John Nance Garner after his resignation (due to Garner being elected Vice President). He was later reelected to seven of his own terms in congress. He was reelected unopposed in 1942, 1944, and 1946 and did not stand for reelection in 1948.

== Death and burial ==
He died in office on October 28, 1948. He was a longtime resident of Brownsville, Texas where his body was buried in Buena Vista Cemetery.

Future U.S. Senator and Secretary of the Treasury Lloyd Bentsen won the special election to fill West's vacant seat.

== Electoral history ==
1933 Texas's 15th congressional district special election
| Party | Candidate | Votes | % |
|---|---|---|---|
| Democratic | Milton H. West | 13,546 | 91.20 |
| Republican | Carlos G. Watson | 1,302 | 8.80 |
| Total votes | | 14,848 | 100.0 |
| Turnout | | | |
| Democratic hold | | | |

1934 United States House of Representatives elections
| Party | Candidate | Votes | % |
|---|---|---|---|
| Democratic | Milton H. West (Incumbent) | 20,102 | 100.00 |
| Total votes | | 20,102 | 100.0 |
| Turnout | | | |
| Democratic hold | | | |

1936 United States House of Representatives elections
| Party | Candidate | Votes | % |
|---|---|---|---|
| Democratic | Milton H. West (Incumbent) | 29,508 | 82.53 |
| Independent | J.A. Simpson | 6,244 | 17.47 |
| Total votes | | 35,752 | 100.0 |
| Turnout | | | |
| Democratic hold | | | |

1938 United States House of Representatives elections
| Party | Candidate | Votes | % |
|---|---|---|---|
| Democratic | Milton H. West (Incumbent) | 18,558 | 99.99 |
| Other write-in votes | Write-in votes | 2 | 0.010 |
| Total votes | | 18,560 | 100.0 |
| Turnout | | | |
| Democratic hold | | | |

1940 United States House of Representatives elections
| Party | Candidate | Votes | % |
|---|---|---|---|
| Democratic | Milton H. West (Incumbent) | 31,800 | 92.36 |
| Republican | J.A. Simpson | 2,628 | 7.64 |
| Total votes | | 34,428 | 100.0 |
| Turnout | | | |
| Democratic hold | | | |

1942 United States House of Representatives elections
| Party | Candidate | Votes | % |
|---|---|---|---|
| Democratic | Milton H. West (Incumbent) | 12,169 | 100.00 |
| Total votes | | 12,169 | 100.0 |
| Turnout | | | |
| Democratic hold | | | |

1944 United States House of Representatives elections
| Party | Candidate | Votes | % |
|---|---|---|---|
| Democratic | Milton H. West (Incumbent) | 36,362 | 99.98 |
| Other write-in votes | Write-in votes | 5 | 0.013 |
| Total votes | | 36,367 | 100.0 |
| Turnout | | | |
| Democratic hold | | | |

1946 United States House of Representatives elections
| Party | Candidate | Votes | % |
|---|---|---|---|
| Democratic | Milton H. West (Incumbent) | 14,623 | 99.98 |
| Other write-in votes | Write-in votes | 3 | 0.020 |
| Total votes | | 14,626 | 100.0 |
| Turnout | | | |
| Democratic hold | | | |

== See also ==
- List of members of the United States Congress who died in office (1900–1949)
- Texas's 15th congressional district
- Texas's congressional delegations

U.S. House of Representatives
| Preceded by John N. Garner | Member of the U.S. House of Representatives from Texas's 15th congressional district April 23, 1933 – October 28, 1948 | Succeeded by Lloyd Bentsen |
