= Joe M. Kilgore =

American politician

Joe Madison Kilgore
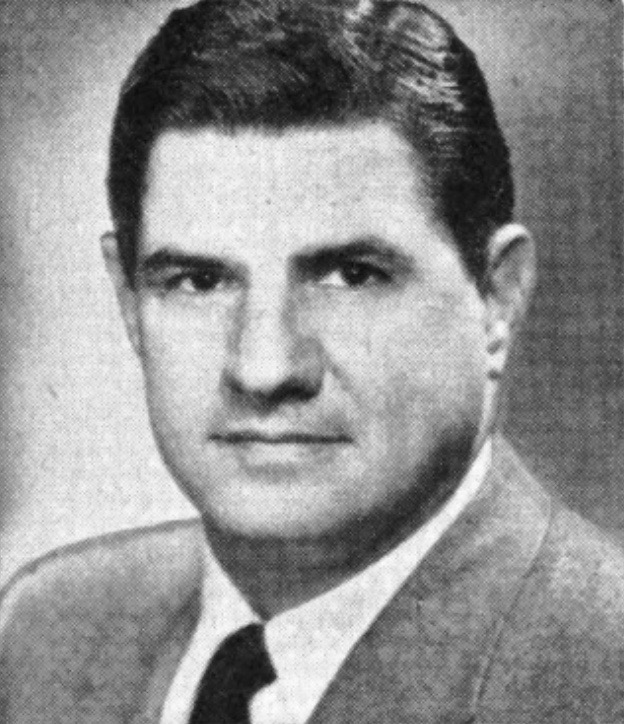

Member of the U.S. House of Representatives from Texas's 15th district
- In office January 3, 1955 – January 3, 1965
- Preceded by: Lloyd Bentsen
- Succeeded by: Kika de la Garza

Member of the Texas House of Representatives from Hidalgo County
- In office 1947–1955
- Preceded by: Eugene Harrell
- Succeeded by: John Taylor Ellis, Jr.

Personal details
- Born: December 10, 1918 Brownwood, Texas, U.S.
- Died: February 10, 1999 (aged 80) Austin, Texas, U.S.
- Resting place: Texas State Cemetery in Austin
- Party: Democratic
- Spouse: Jane Redman Kilgore
- Education: Trinity University; University of Texas School of Law
- Occupation: Lawyer
- Awards: Silver Star; Distinguished Flying Cross; Air Medal with two Oak leaf clusters

Military service
- Branch/service: United States Army Air Corps
- Rank: Lieutenant Colonel
- Battles/wars: World War II Mediterranean Theater of Operations

Joe Madison Kilgore (December 10, 1918 – February 10, 1999) was an American lawyer, politician, and decorated World War II veteran who served five terms as a U.S. Representative from Texas's 15th congressional district from 1955 to 1965.

== Early life and education ==
Born in Brown County, near Brownwood in west central Texas, Kilgore attended the public schools of Rising Star in Eastland County in north central Texas. In 1929, he moved with his family to Mission in south Texas, where he also attended public schools.

From 1935 to 1936, Kilgore attended Trinity University, then known as Westmoreland College, located in San Antonio, Texas.

== World War II ==
His legal studies were interrupted at the University of Texas School of Law in July 1941 to enlist in the United States Army Air Corps. He was a combat pilot in the Mediterranean Theater of Operations.

Kilgore was awarded the Silver Star, Distinguished Flying Cross, and Air Medal with two Oak leaf clusters. He was discharged from active duty the Army in 1945. He continued his military career in the United States Air Force Reserve.

== Legal career ==
He returned to law school, and in 1946 he was admitted to the bar. He began his law practice in Edinburg, Texas in Hidalgo County in south Texas.

== Political career ==
He served as member of the Texas House from 1947 to 1955. He was a delegate to the Democratic National Conventions in 1956, 1960, and 1968.

=== Congress ===
Kilgore was elected as a Democrat to the Eighty-fourth and to the four succeeding Congresses (January 3, 1955 to January 3, 1965), when he was one of the majority of the Texan delegation to decline to sign the 1956 Southern Manifesto opposing the desegregation of public schools ordered by the Supreme Court in Brown v. Board of Education. Kilgore voted against the Civil Rights Act of 1957, the Civil Rights Acts of 1964, and the 24th Amendment to the U.S. Constitution, but in favor of the Civil Rights Act of 1960. He was not a candidate for renomination in 1964 to the Eighty-ninth Congress.

== Later career and death ==
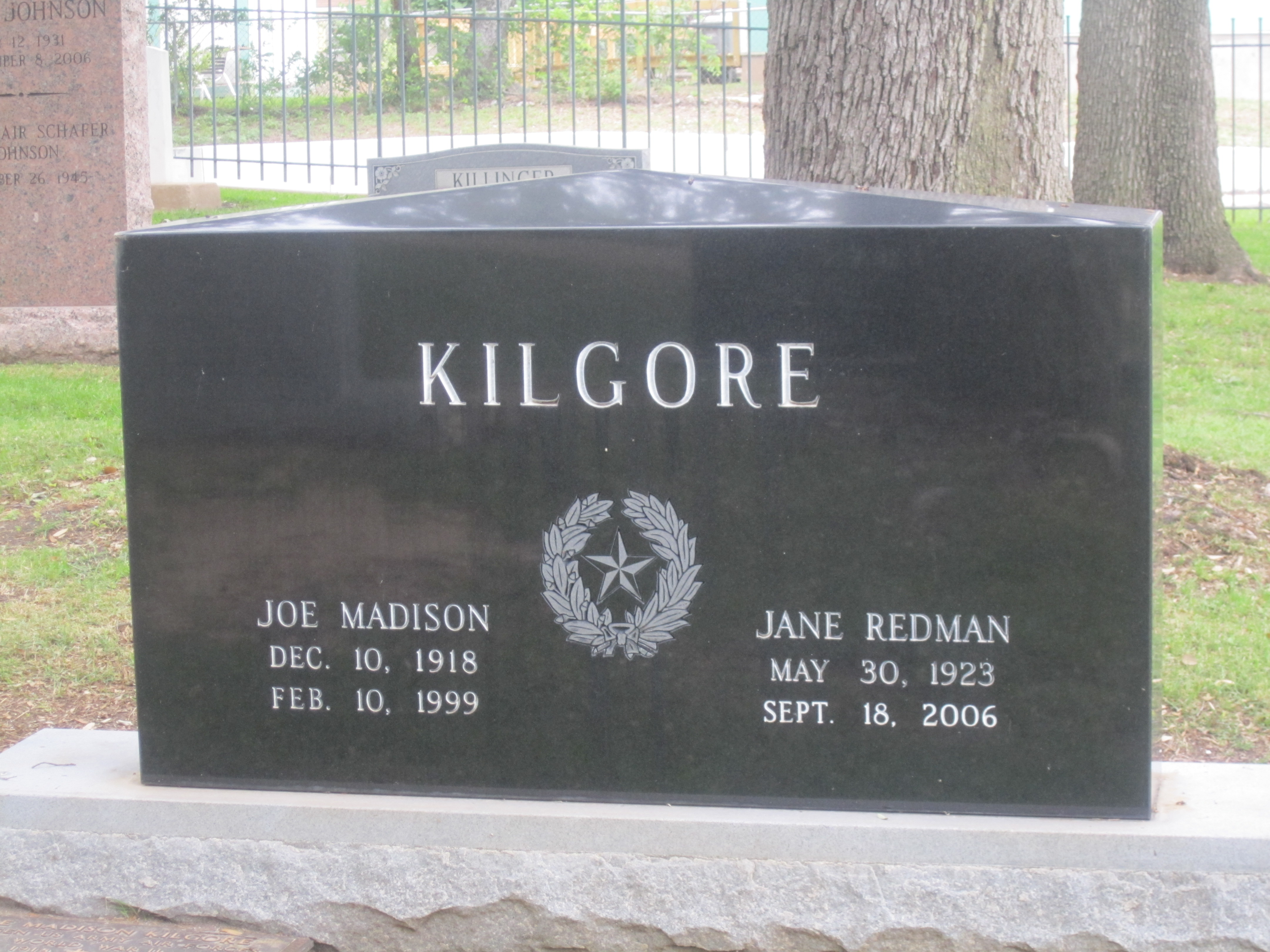
Kilgore grave at Texas State Cemetery in Austin, Texas

Instead, he resumed the practice of law, residing in Austin until his death there on February 10, 1999. He is interred in Austin at the Texas State Cemetery alongside his wife, the former Jane Redman (1923–2006).

== Electoral results ==
1954 United States House of Representatives elections
| Party | Candidate | Votes | % |
|---|---|---|---|
| Democratic | Joe M. Kilgore | 29,113 | 100.00 |
| Total votes | | 29,113 | 100.0 |
| Turnout | | | |
| Democratic hold | | | |

1956 United States House of Representatives elections
| Party | Candidate | Votes | % |
|---|---|---|---|
| Democratic | Joe M. Kilgore (Incumbent) | 64,011 | 100.00 |
| Total votes | | 64,011 | 100.0 |
| Turnout | | | |
| Democratic hold | | | |

1958 United States House of Representatives elections
| Party | Candidate | Votes | % |
|---|---|---|---|
| Democratic | Joe M. Kilgore (Incumbent) | 28,404 | 100.00 |
| Total votes | | 28,404 | 100.0 |
| Turnout | | | |
| Democratic hold | | | |

1960 United States House of Representatives elections
| Party | Candidate | Votes | % |
|---|---|---|---|
| Democratic | Joe M. Kilgore (Incumbent) | 76,421 | 100.00 |
| Total votes | | 76,421 | 100.0 |
| Turnout | | | |
| Democratic hold | | | |

1962 United States House of Representatives elections
| Party | Candidate | Votes | % |
|---|---|---|---|
| Democratic | Joe M. Kilgore (Incumbent) | 53,552 | 100.00 |
| Total votes | | 53,552 | 100.0 |
| Turnout | | | |
| Democratic hold | | | |

| Preceded by Eugene Harrell | Texas State Representative from District 91 (including Hidalgo County); 1947–1955 | Succeeded by John Taylor Ellis, Jr. |
| Preceded by Lloyd Bentsen | United States Representative from Texas's 15th congressional district 1955–1965 | Succeeded by Kika de la Garza |
