= Rubén Hinojosa =

American politician (born 1940)

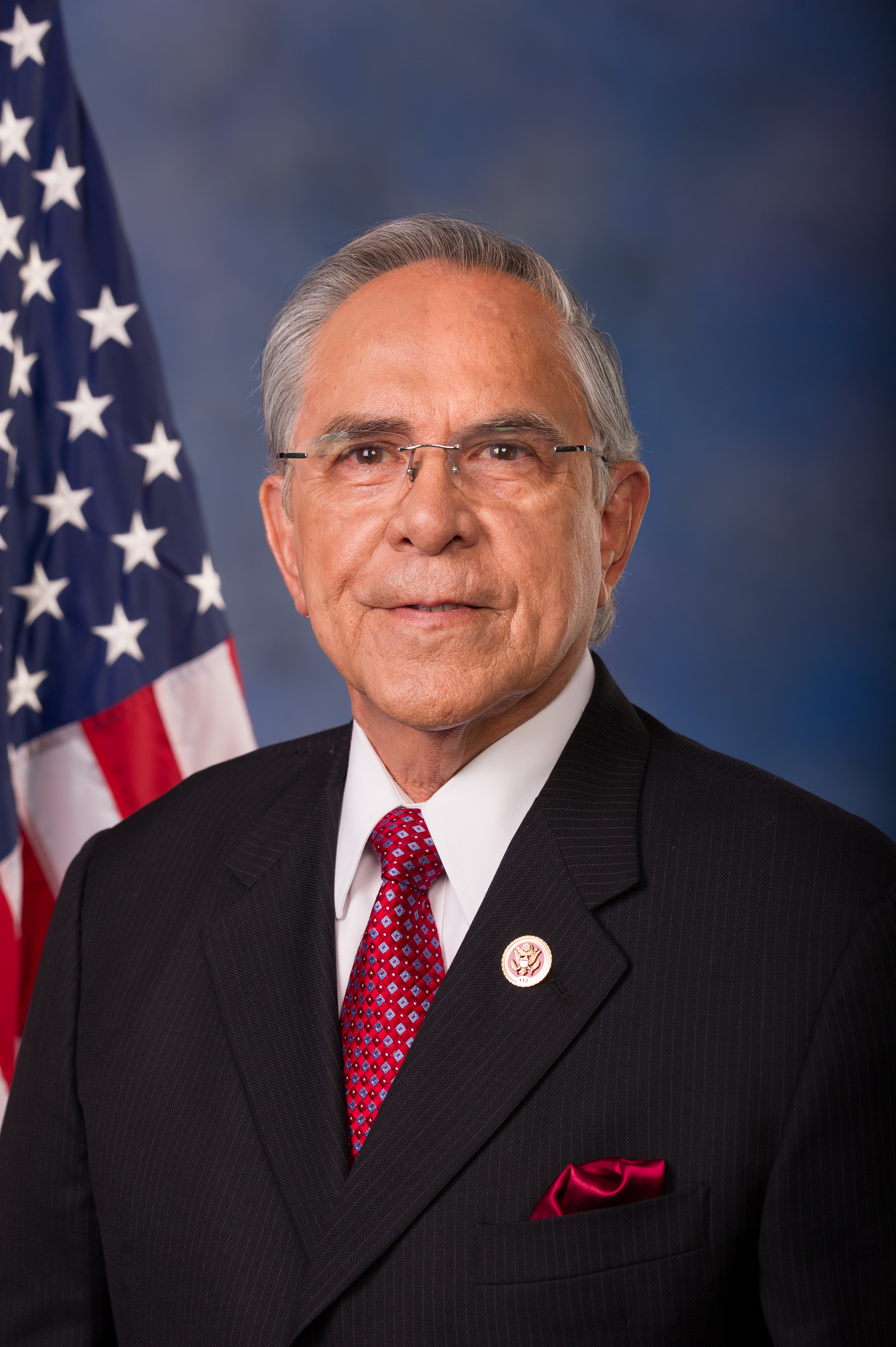

Member of the U.S. House of Representatives from Texas's 15th district
- In office January 3, 1997 – January 3, 2017
- Preceded by: Kika de la Garza
- Succeeded by: Vicente González

Personal details
- Born: Rubén Eloy Hinojosa; August 20, 1940 (age 86) Edcouch, Texas, U.S.
- Party: Democratic
- Spouse: Martha Lopez
- Education: Texas A&M University, Kingsville (attended); University of Texas, Austin (BBA); University of Texas, Pan American (MBA)
- Hinojosa's voice Hinojosa supporting the Adult Education and Economic Growth Act of 2009. Recorded July 21, 2009

Rubén Eloy Hinojosa (born August 20, 1940) is an American politician who served as the U.S. representative for Texas's 15th congressional district, from 1997 to 2017. He is a member of the Democratic Party. The district stretched from Seguin (east of San Antonio), to McAllen on the Mexican border. Much of the region was rural although Hidalgo County is part of the third-fastest-growing metropolitan statistical area in the country. Hinojosa served on the Financial Services and Education committees.

== Early life and education ==
Hinojosa was born in Edcouch, Texas. The eighth of eleven children, Hinojosa was reared in Hidalgo County, which borders on Mexico, and earned two business degrees, a Bachelor of Business Administration from the University of Texas at Austin and his MBA from the University of Texas–Pan American.

== Career ==
In 1974, Hinojosa was elected to the Texas State Board of Education, a position which he held for ten years.

Hinojosa's father and uncle founded H&H Foods in 1947 as a slaughterhouse. Control of the firm passed in 1976 to himself and his brother, Liborio. He gave up his executive position when he entered Congress, but remained a director and major stockholder.

== U.S. House of Representatives ==
=== Committee assignments ===
- Committee on Education and the Workforce
  - Subcommittee on Higher Education and Workforce Training (Ranking Member)
  - Subcommittee on Health, Employment, Labor, and Pensions
- Committee on Financial Services
  - Subcommittee on Capital Markets, Insurance, and Government-Sponsored Enterprises
  - Subcommittee on Financial Institutions and Consumer Credit

== Political campaigns ==
After 32-year incumbent Kika de la Garza announced his retirement, Hinojosa won a five-way primary for the seat by only 588 votes. This practically assured him of being only the sixth person to represent this heavily Democratic, Latino-majority district. He defeated Republican Tom Haughey with 62 percent of the vote. He defeated Haughey again in 1998, winning 59 percent of the vote. In 2000, he took 89 percent of the vote against the Independent Frank L. Jones, III. In 2002, he was unopposed. In 2004, Hinojosa faced Republican Michael Thamm in the redrawn District 15 and defeated the former major, winning 59 percent of the vote. In the 2006 mid-term election he faced Paul Haring and Eddie Zamora, both Republicans. Hinojosa won 61 percent of the vote in the once-again redrawn district.

In the general election held on November 4, 2014, Hinojosa squared off once again with the Republican Eddie Zamora, who received 7,776 votes (54.9 percent) in the primary election held on March 4. Douglas A. "Doug" Carlile (born c. 1963) polled the remaining 6,393 Republican ballots (45.1 percent).

Hinojosa did not seek an eleventh term in the House in 2016. Democrats Vicente Gonzalez and Juan "Sonny" Palacios, Jr., met in the May 24 runoff election to select a successor nominee.

Three Republicans contested the seat in the primary election. Tim Westley, a pastor of Shepherd's Vineyard Christian Church in San Antonio who carried the backing of the Tea Party movement, led the field with 13,153 votes (45.3 percent). He faced a runoff on May 24 with Ruben O. Villarreal, who received 9,131 votes (31.5 percent); the third-place candidate, Xavier Salinas, drew a critical 6,730 votes (23.2 percent). Villarreal is the mayor of Rio Grande City, a non-partisan position, in heavily Democratic Starr County.

Three candidates, Democrat Vicente Gonzalez, Republican Tim Westley and Green Vanessa Tijerina, competed in the November 8, 2016, general election for the right to succeed Hinojosa.

In 2016, it was revealed he was one of 9 members of Congress who took a trip secretly funded by the government of Azerbaijan and had to turn over gifts the country gave him to the House Clerk after an ethics investigation.

== Political positions ==
Hinojosa has been called a "hard-core liberal" and a "rank-and-file Democrat". The 'That's My Congress' website has given Hinojosa a "Liberal Action Score" of 37/100 and a "Conservative Action Score" of 16/100 for his votes in the 112th Congress.

During the 111th Congress, Hinojosa voted with his party 99 percent of the time. He voted to extend the Patriot Act and supported the 2011 budget compromise. He voted for the Patient Protection and Affordable Care Act (Obamacare), the American Clean Energy and Security Act, otherwise known as "Cap and Trade", and the Troubled Asset Relief Program.

Hinojosa has emphasized assisting minorities and low-income Americans gain access to higher education. He has been especially active in supporting water-conservation projects along the Mexican border, and in replacing federal subsidies for student loans with direct government loans. Hinojosa and George Miller were responsible for constructing the 2008 Higher Education Opportunity Act, which increased the maximum Pell Grants available to low-income students and authorized additional funding for minority-serving schools.

He co-sponsored a 2010 bill for enhanced border security, but has opposed the construction of a wall along the border.

He has also been a very strong supporter of free-trade agreements, and was one of 15 House Democrats to vote for the 2005 Central American Free Trade Agreement.

In 2010, Hinojosa supported the introduction of full-body scanners at Valley International Airport. He said that we need to take more precautions when it comes to public safety, and that the new technology "gives TSA employees a distinct advantage in the prevention of terrorist events."

In June 2011, Hinojosa introduced legislation that would expand the authority of NADBank, which had already funded more than 100 projects to prevent the release of untreated sewage into the Rio Grande and other bodies of water, to finance infrastructure projects designed to enhance economic development along the border and raise environmental standards.

He has also supported measures to aid undocumented workers. He backed the "AgJobs" bill aimed at helping undocumented farm workers. He has been an advocate of the DREAM Act, which would provide citizenship to people who were brought to the U.S. as children by their parents. He cited his concern that these children came to the US alongside their parents and should not be faulted. Hinojosa argued that "[o]ur country is much better off by being able to let those children get a college education and serve in the military and contribute to the prosperity of our country."

== Personal life ==
Hinojosa is married to Martha Lopez Hinojosa and they have two daughters, Kaitlin and Karen. He has one son, Ruben Jr., and two daughters from a previous marriage.

=== Bankruptcy ===
Hinojosa filed for personal bankruptcy in December 2010. He blamed the bankruptcy on a loan made to his family's food processing company, H&H Foods that left him owing $2.6 million to Wells Fargo Bank.

== See also ==
- List of Hispanic and Latino Americans in the United States Congress

U.S. House of Representatives
Preceded by Kika de la Garza	Member of the U.S. House of Representatives from Texas's 15th congressional district 1997–2017	Succeeded by Vicente González
Preceded by Charlie Gonzalez	Chair of the Congressional Hispanic Caucus; 2013–2015	Succeeded by Linda Sánchez
U.S. order of precedence (ceremonial)
Preceded by Chet Edwards as Former U.S. Representative	Order of precedence of the United States as Former U.S. Representative	Succeeded by Tom Latham as Former U.S. Representative
