= Abram-Perezville, Texas =

- Former census-designated place
- Coordinates: 26°14′20″N 98°24′17″W
- Country: United States of America
- State: Texas
- County: Hidalgo

Area
  - Total: 5.3 sq mi (13.6 km^{2})
  - Land: 5.1 sq mi (13.1 km^{2})
  - Water: 0.19 sq mi (0.5 km^{2})

Population (2010)
  - Total: 5,376
- Time zone: UTC-6 (Central (CST))
  - Summer (DST): UTC-5 (CDT)
- FIPS code: 48-01066

Abram-Perezville is a former census-designated place (CDP) in Hidalgo County, Texas. The population was 5,376 at the 2010 United States census. It is part of the McAllen–Edinburg–Mission Metropolitan Statistical Area. For the 2010 census, the CDP was split into Abram and Perezville.

== Geography ==
Abram-Perezville is located at 26°14′20″N 98°24′17″W (26.238767, -98.404720).

According to the United States Census Bureau, the CDP has a total area of 5.3 square miles (14 km^{2}), of which 5.1 square miles (13 km^{2}) is land and 0.2 square miles (0.52 km^{2}) (3.61%) is water.

== Demographics ==
Historical population
Census	Pop.	Note	%±
1990	3,999		—
2000	5,376		34.4%
U.S. Decennial Census; 1850–1900 1910; 1920 1930 1940; 1950 1960 1970; 1980 1990 2000; 2010

Abram-Perezville first appeared as a census designated place in the 1990 U.S. census. It was split into the Abram CDP and the Perezville CDP prior to the 2010 U.S. census.

Abram-Perezville CDP, Texas – Racial and ethnic composition Note: the US Census treats Hispanic/Latino as an ethnic category. This table excludes Latinos from the racial categories and assigns them to a separate category. Hispanics/Latinos may be of any race.
Race / Ethnicity (NH = Non-Hispanic)	Pop 2000	Pop 1990	% 2000	% 1990
White alone (NH)	974	860	17.89%	21.51%
Black or African American alone (NH)	5	1	0.09%	0.03%
Native American or Alaska Native alone (NH)	0	0	0.00%	0.00%
Asian alone (NH)	3	3	0.06%	0.08%
Pacific Islander alone (NH)	0	–	0.00%	–
Other race alone (NH)	4	3	0.07%	0.08%
Mixed race or Multiracial (NH)	16	–	0.29%	–
Hispanic or Latino (any race)	4,442	3,132	81.59%	78.32%
Total	5,444	3,999	100.00%	100.00%

As of the census of 2000, there were 5,444 people, 1,617 households, and 1,387 families residing in the CDP. The population density was 1,073.9 inhabitants per square mile (414.6/km^{2}). There were 3,060 housing units at an average density of 603.6 per square mile (233.1/km^{2}). The racial makeup of the CDP was 47.17% White, 0.22% African American, 0.06% Asian, 48.79% from other races, and 3.77% from two or more races. Hispanic or Latino of any race were 81.59% of the population.

There were 1,617 households, out of which 42.7% had children under the age of 18 living with them, 72.9% were married couples living together, 10.2% had a female householder with no husband present, and 14.2% were non-families. 11.6% of all households were made up of individuals, and 8.2% had someone living alone who was 65 years of age or older. The average household size was 3.37 and the average family size was 3.67.

In the CDP, the population was spread out, with 32.8% under the age of 18, 11.0% from 18 to 24, 24.3% from 25 to 44, 14.0% from 45 to 64, and 17.9% who were 65 years of age or older. The median age was 29 years. For every 100 females, there were 94.0 males. For every 100 females age 18 and over, there were 91.8 males.

The median income for a household in the CDP was $22,532, and the median income for a family was $23,956. Males had a median income of $19,044 versus $18,188 for females. The per capita income for the CDP was $8,195. About 32.4% of families and 41.0% of the population were below the poverty line, including 56.8% of those under age 18 and 9.5% of those age 65 or over.

== Education ==
Abram-Perezville is served by the La Joya Independent School District.

In addition, residents are allowed to apply to magnet schools operated by the South Texas Independent School District.
