= Abram, Texas =

- Unincorporated community Census designated place
- Location within Texas Location within the United States
- Coordinates: 26°11′59″N 98°24′40″W
- Country: United States
- State: Texas
- County: Hidalgo

Area
  - Total: 3.580 sq mi (9.27 km^{2})
  - Land: 3.391 sq mi (8.78 km^{2})
  - Water: 0.189 sq mi (0.49 km^{2})
- Elevation: 118 ft (36 m)

Population (2020)
  - Total: 1,108
  - Density: 326.7/sq mi (126.2/km^{2})
- Time zone: UTC-6 (Central (CST))
  - Summer (DST): UTC-5 (CDT)
- Area code: 956
- GNIS feature ID: 1329182

Abram is an unincorporated community and census-designated place in Hidalgo County, Texas, United States. As of the 2020 census, Abram had a population of 1,108. The community was named after Texas Ranger Abram Dillard, who was a resident of the area.

== Geography ==
According to the U.S. Census Bureau, the community has an area of 3.580 square miles (9.27 km^{2}); 3.391 square miles (8.78 km^{2}) of its area is land, and 0.189 square miles (0.49 km^{2}) is water.

== Education ==
Abram is served by the La Joya Independent School District. Schools serving the CDP include Guillermo Flores Elementary School and JFK Elementary School, C. Chavez Middle School, and La Joya High School.

== Demographics ==
Historical population
Census	Pop.	Note	%±
2010	2,067		—
2020	1,108		−46.4%
U.S. Decennial Census; 1850–1900 1910; 1920 1930 1940; 1950 1960 1970; 1980 1990 2000; 2010 2020

Prior to 2010, the community was part of the Abram-Perezville census-designated place with nearby Perezville.

=== 2020 Census ===
Abram CDP, Texas – Racial and ethnic composition Note: the US Census treats Hispanic/Latino as an ethnic category. This table excludes Latinos from the racial categories and assigns them to a separate category. Hispanics/Latinos may be of any race.
Race / Ethnicity (NH = Non-Hispanic)	Pop 2010	Pop 2020	% 2010	% 2020
White alone (NH)	14	17	0.68%	1.53%
Black or African American alone (NH)	1	0	0.05%	0.00%
Native American or Alaska Native alone (NH)	0	0	0.00%	0.00%
Asian alone (NH)	0	0	0.00%	0.00%
Native Hawaiian or Pacific Islander alone (NH)	0	0	0.00%	0.00%
Other race alone (NH)	0	5	0.00%	0.45%
Mixed race or Multiracial (NH)	0	1	0.00%	0.09%
Hispanic or Latino (any race)	2,052	1,085	99.27%	97.92%
Total	2,067	1,108	100.00%	100.00%
