= 1976 United States Senate election in Texas =

- November 2, 1976
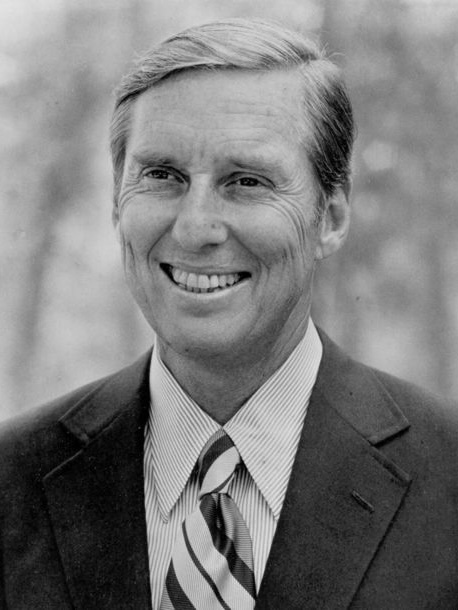

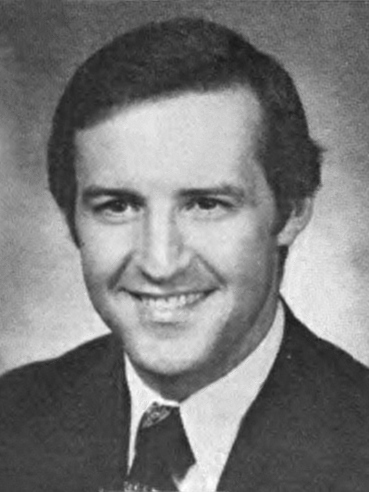
Nominee	Lloyd Bentsen	Alan Steelman
Party	Democratic	Republican
Popular vote	2,199,956	1,636,370
Percentage	56.78%	42.24%
- County results Bentsen: 50–60% 60–70% 70–80% 80–90% >90% Steelman: 50–60% 60–70%
U.S. senator before election
Lloyd Bentsen
Democratic
Elected U.S. Senator
Lloyd Bentsen
Democratic

The 1976 United States Senate election in Texas was held on November 2, 1976. Incumbent Democratic U.S. Senator Lloyd Bentsen won re-election to a second term.

== Democratic primary ==
=== Candidates ===
- Lloyd Bentsen, incumbent U.S. Senator
- Leon Dugi
- Phil Gramm, Texas A&M economics professor
- Hugh Wilson

=== Results ===
1976 Democratic Senate primary
Party	Candidate	Votes	%
Democratic	Lloyd Bentsen (incumbent)	970,983	63.54%
Democratic	Phil Gramm	427,597	27.98%
Democratic	Hugh Wilson	109,715	7.18%
Democratic	Leon Dugi	19,870	1.30%
Total votes		1,528,165	100.00%

== Republican primary ==
=== Candidates ===
- Alan Steelman, U.S. Representative from Texas's 5th district since 1973

== General election ==
=== Results ===
General election results
Party	Candidate	Votes	%	±%
Democratic	Lloyd Bentsen (incumbent)	2,199,956	56.78%	▲3.23%
Republican	Alan Steelman	1,636,370	42.24%	▼4.21%
Socialist Workers	Pedro Vasquez	20,549	0.53%	N/A
American Independent	Marjorie P. Gallion	17,355	0.45%	N/A
Total votes		3,874,230	100.0%	
Democratic hold				

== See also ==
- 1976 United States Senate elections
