= Alan Steelman =

American businessman and politician (born 1942)

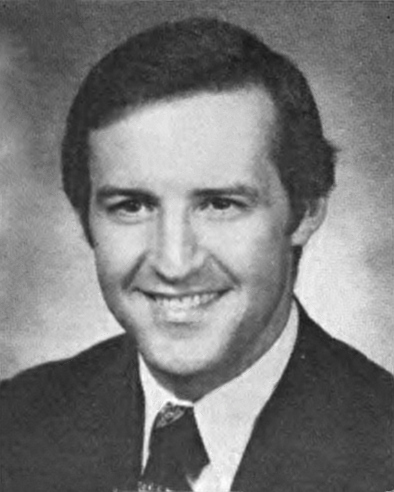

Member of the U.S. House of Representatives from Texas's 5th district
- In office January 3, 1973 – January 3, 1977
- Preceded by: Earle Cabell
- Succeeded by: Jim Mattox

Personal details
- Born: Alan Watson Steelman; March 15, 1942 (age 84) Little Rock, Arkansas, U.S.
- Party: Republican
- Spouse: Susan Seligman Fuller
- Children: 3, 2 stepchildren
- Education: Baylor University (BA); Southern Methodist University (MA)

Alan Watson Steelman (born March 15, 1942) is an American businessman from Dallas who served as a Republican congressman from Texas between 1973 and 1977.

== Political career ==
=== U.S. Representative ===
Steelman served on two committees: Government Operations and Interior and Insular Affairs. He focused on environmental issues, namely the fight against the Trinity River Canal and for Big Thicket National Preserve. Additional priorities included energy, transportation, veterans, wage and price controls, and Social Security.

Steelman ran for the United States Senate in 1976 but lost to Democratic Senator Lloyd Bentsen 57% to 42%.

=== Endorsements ===
In August 2020, Steelman endorsed Joe Biden for president. He was a member of the steering committee of Republicans and Independents for Biden. Following the 2021 storming of the United States Capitol, Steelman signed a letter supporting the impeachment of Donald Trump.

Steelman endorsed Kamala Harris for president in 2024.

In 2026, Alan Steelman endorsed James Talarico, the Democratic nominee for the race. He campaigned for Talarico at the Collin County rally, criticizing Ken Paxton, the Republican nominee running against Talarico. In an interview with Jen Phillips, anchor and host of Talking Points at KAMC News, Steelman expressed his support of Talarico, arguing that Talarico aligns closely with the ideals of Abraham Lincoln, Theodore Roosevelt, and Dwight D. Eisenhower.

== Personal life ==
In 1977, he began work with Alexander Proudfoot, a listed company on the London Stock Exchange, and is Vice Chairman. He has served as Group President for the Asia-Pacific region of Proudfoot and lived in Singapore for eight years to build the start-up there. In 1978, he was elected to the Common Cause National Governing Board. He was appointed by Governor George W. Bush to the Texas Growth Fund Board, a $600 million venture capital fund run by the State of Texas. He has also served as Vice Chairman of the Board at the John Tower Center for Political Studies at SMU and the Trinity Foundation, Chairman of the Dallas Council on World Affairs, and former President of Maxager Technology, Inc. (Profit Velocity Solutions).

U.S. House of Representatives
Preceded by Earle Cabell	Member of the U.S. House of Representatives from Texas's 5th congressional district 1973–1977	Succeeded by Jim Mattox
Party political offices
Preceded by George H. W. Bush	Republican nominee for U.S. Senator from Texas (Class 1); 1976	Succeeded by James M. Collins
U.S. order of precedence (ceremonial)
Preceded by Sheila Cherfilus-McCormick as Former U.S. Representative	Order of precedence of the United States as Former U.S. Representative	Succeeded by Beau Boulter as Former U.S. Representative
