= Perezville, Texas =

- Unincorporated community
- Location within Texas Location within the United States
- Coordinates: 26°13′28″N 98°24′02″W
- Country: United States
- State: Texas
- County: Hidalgo

Area
  - Total: 1.651 sq mi (4.28 km^{2})
  - Land: 1.651 sq mi (4.28 km^{2})
  - Water: 0 sq mi (0 km^{2})
- Elevation: 131 ft (40 m)

Population (2010)
  - Total: 5,376
  - Density: 3,256/sq mi (1,257/km^{2})
- Time zone: UTC-6 (Central (CST))
  - Summer (DST): UTC-5 (CDT)
- ZIP code: 78572
- Area code: 956
- GNIS feature ID: 1343854

Perezville is an unincorporated community and census-designated place in Hidalgo County, Texas, United States. As of the 2020 census, Perezville had a population of 2,685. Prior to 2010, the community was part of the Abram-Perezville census-designated place along with nearby Abram.

== Geography ==
According to the U.S. Census Bureau, the community has an area of 1.651 square miles (4.28 km^{2}), all land.

== Education ==
Perezville is served by the La Joya Independent School District. Schools serving the CDP include:

- Elementary: Guillermo Flores, Henry B. Gonzáles, JFK, and E.B. Reyna
- Middle: C. Chavez, Irene Garcia, and A. Richards
- La Joya High School.

== Demographics ==
Historical population
| Census | Pop. | Note | %± |
|---|---|---|---|
| 2010 | 5,376 | | — |
| 2020 | 2,685 | | −50.1% |
U.S. Decennial Census; 1850–1900 1910; 1920 1930 1940; 1950 1960 1970; 1980 1990 2000; 2010 2020

Prior to 2010, the community was part of the Abram-Perezville census-designated place with nearby Abram.

=== 2020 Census ===
Perezville CDP, Texas – Racial and ethnic composition Note: the US Census treats Hispanic/Latino as an ethnic category. This table excludes Latinos from the racial categories and assigns them to a separate category. Hispanics/Latinos may be of any race.
| Race / Ethnicity (NH = Non-Hispanic) | Pop 2010 | Pop 2020 | % 2010 | % 2020 |
|---|---|---|---|---|
| White alone (NH) | 1,424 | 755 | 26.49% | 28.12% |
| Black or African American alone (NH) | 6 | 4 | 0.11% | 0.15% |
| Native American or Alaska Native alone (NH) | 17 | 1 | 0.32% | 0.04% |
| Asian alone (NH) | 2 | 0 | 0.04% | 0.00% |
| Native Hawaiian or Pacific Islander alone (NH) | 0 | 0 | 0.00% | 0.00% |
| Other race alone (NH) | 0 | 0 | 0.00% | 0.00% |
| Mixed race or Multiracial (NH) | 6 | 12 | 0.11% | 0.45% |
| Hispanic or Latino (any race) | 3,921 | 1,913 | 72.94% | 71.25% |
| Total | 5,376 | 2,685 | 100.00% | 100.00% |
