= Lloyd Bentsen =

American politician (1921–2006)

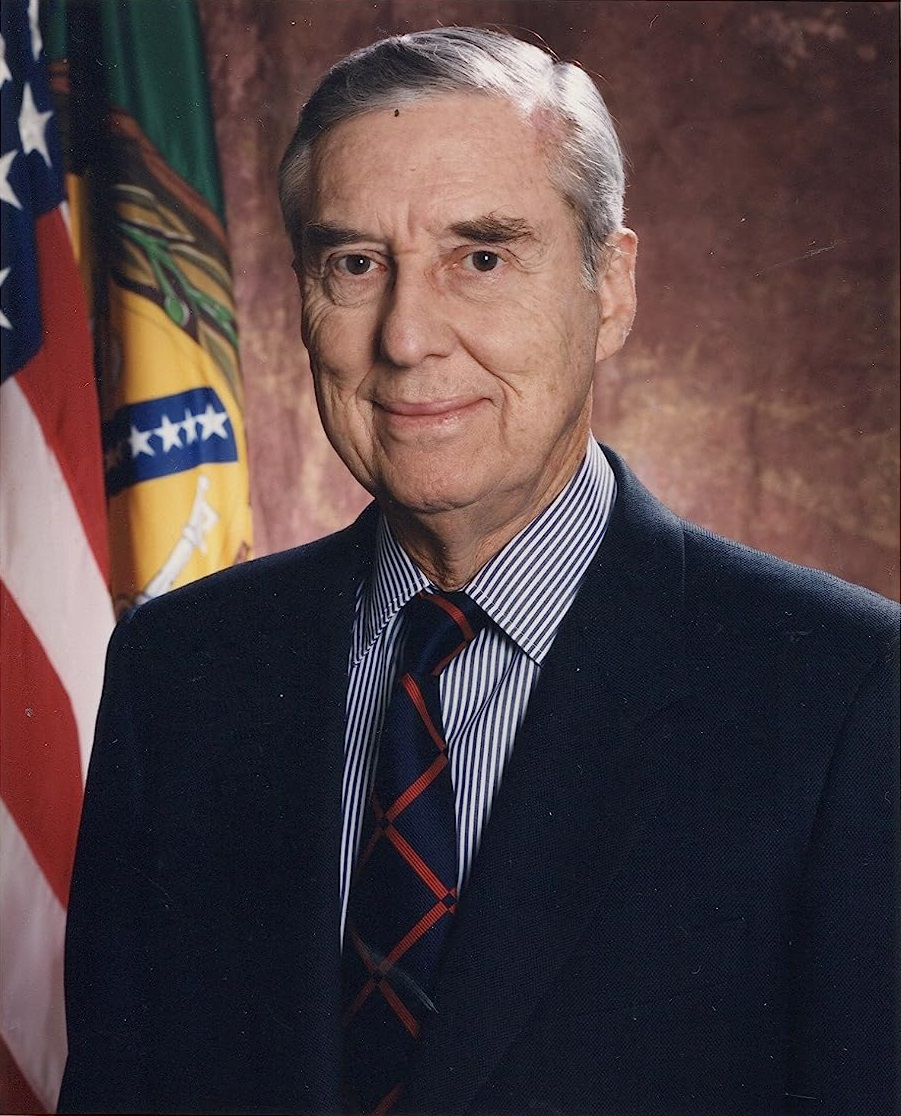
- Official portrait, 1993

69th United States Secretary of the Treasury
- In office January 20, 1993 – December 22, 1994
- President: Bill Clinton
- Preceded by: Nicholas F. Brady
- Succeeded by: Robert Rubin

United States Senator from Texas
- In office January 3, 1971 – January 20, 1993
- Preceded by: Ralph Yarborough
- Succeeded by: Bob Krueger
Senate positions
Chair of the Senate Finance Committee
In office January 3, 1987 – January 20, 1993
| Preceded by | Bob Packwood |
| Succeeded by | Daniel Patrick Moynihan |
Ranking Member of the Senate Environment Committee
In office January 3, 1985 – January 3, 1987
| Preceded by | Jennings Randolph |
| Succeeded by | Robert Stafford |
Chair of the Joint Economic Committee
In office January 3, 1979 – January 3, 1981
| Preceded by | Richard W. Bolling |
| Succeeded by | Henry S. Reuss |
Chair of the Democratic Senatorial Campaign Committee
In office January 3, 1983 – January 3, 1985
| Leader | Robert Byrd |
| Preceded by | Wendell Ford |
| Succeeded by | George Mitchell |
In office January 3, 1973 – January 19, 1976
| Leader | Mike Mansfield |
| Preceded by | Fritz Hollings |
| Succeeded by | J. Bennett Johnston |

Member of the U.S. House of Representatives from Texas's 15th district
- In office December 4, 1948 – January 3, 1955
- Preceded by: Milton West
- Succeeded by: Joe M. Kilgore

Hidalgo County Judge
- In office 1946–1948
- Preceded by: J.C. Looney
- Succeeded by: Ramiro M. Guerra

Personal details
- Born: Lloyd Millard Bentsen Jr. February 11, 1921 Mission, Texas, U.S.
- Died: May 23, 2006 (aged 85) Houston, Texas, U.S.
- Party: Democratic
- Spouse: Beryl Ann Longino (m. 1943)
- Children: 3
- Education: University of Texas at Austin (LLB)

Military service
- Branch/service: United States Army; Army Air Forces; United States Air Force; Air Force Reserve
- Years of service: 1942–1947 (active); 1950–1959 (reserve)
- Rank: Colonel
- Unit: 15th Air Force; 449th Bombardment Group
- Battles/wars: World War II; Mediterranean theater; European theater
- Awards: Distinguished Flying Cross; Air Medal (4)
- Bentsen's voice Bentsen on the achievements of the Clinton administration at the end of his time as Treasury Secretary; Recorded December 6, 1994

Lloyd Millard Bentsen Jr. (February 11, 1921 – May 23, 2006) was an American politician who served as the 69th United States secretary of the treasury under President Bill Clinton from 1993 to 1994. He served as a United States senator from Texas from 1971 to 1993 and was the Democratic Party nominee for vice president in 1988 on the Michael Dukakis ticket.

Born in Mission, Texas, Bentsen graduated from the University of Texas School of Law before serving in the U.S. Army Air Forces during World War II. He was awarded the Distinguished Flying Cross for his service in Europe. After the war, he won election to the U.S. House of Representatives, serving from 1948 to 1955. He defeated incumbent Senator Ralph Yarborough in the 1970 Democratic senatorial primary and won the general election against George H. W. Bush. He was reelected in 1976, 1982, and 1988, and served as chairman of the U.S. Senate Committee on Finance from 1987 to 1993. In the Senate, he helped win passage of the Employee Retirement Income Security Act and played a role in the creation of the individual retirement account. Bentsen sought the 1976 Democratic presidential nomination but was unable to organize an effective national campaign.

Democratic presidential nominee Michael Dukakis chose Bentsen as his running mate in the 1988 presidential election, while the Republicans nominated Vice President George H. W. Bush and Senator Dan Quayle. During the 1988 vice presidential debate, Quayle responded to a question about his purported inexperience by comparing his time in office up to that point to that of John F. Kennedy, leading Bentsen to famously castigate Quayle: "Senator, you're no Jack Kennedy." Although Dukakis hoped that the selection of Bentsen would help the Democratic ticket win Texas, the Republican ticket won the state and prevailed by a wide margin in the nationwide electoral and popular vote. Bentsen considered running for president in 1992 but chose not to challenge Bush, who was popular after the Gulf War.

After defeating Bush in 1992, Clinton offered Bentsen the position of Secretary of the Treasury. Bentsen accepted, although he told Clinton that he would not serve a full four-year term in the office. As Treasury Secretary, he helped win the ratification of the North American Free Trade Agreement and the passage of the Omnibus Budget Reconciliation Act of 1993. Bentsen retired in December 1994 and was succeeded by Robert Rubin. He was awarded the Presidential Medal of Freedom in 1999.

Until the 2026 election of James Talarico, Bentsen was the last Democrat elected to represent Texas in the Senate.

== Early life ==
Bentsen was born in Mission, Hidalgo County, Texas, to Lloyd Millard Bentsen Sr. (known as "Big Lloyd"), a first-generation Danish-American, and his wife, Edna Ruth (Colbath). The elder Bentsen's parents, Niels Peter and Tena, had come from Denmark to be homesteaders and farmers at Argo Township, near White and Brookings, South Dakota; they experienced many hardships, including loss of their first dwelling and belongings to fire, crop failure, and poor medical care.

Their son started out harvesting and taming mustangs for local farmers, then served in the United States Signal Corps during World War I. He and Edna accompanied his parents on their relocation to the "citrus and vegetable utopia" of Sharyland, Texas, where Peter Bentsen worked as a land agent for Sharyland's founder, John H. Shary, and started a nursery seedling business. Lloyd Sr. and his brother Elmer helped with the family business, investing in land purchase, becoming the "premier colonizers and developers of Hidalgo County", and gaining a substantial fortune from the "Pride O Texas" citrus trademark.

The brothers were directors of the Elsa State Bank; Lloyd Sr. was also a principal at several First National banks, president of the Rio Grande Valley Chamber of Commerce from 1944 to 1946, and played a major role in the unity and development of Cameron, Hidalgo, Starr, and Willacy Counties. Both brothers donated land that became the Bentsen-Rio Grande Valley State Park. Eventually moving out of land development due to some disputes mainly resulting from crop failure due to a severe freeze, Lloyd Sr. invested $7 million in an insurance and financial holding company in Houston, of which his son, Lloyd Jr., was chief executive until running for the U.S. Senate in 1971. In 1959, Texas Governor Allan Shivers appointed Lloyd Sr. major general in the Texas State Guard Reserve Corps. He died after a car accident, aged 95.

At age 15, Lloyd Jr. graduated from Sharyland High School in Mission. He was an Eagle Scout and received the Distinguished Eagle Scout Award from the Boy Scouts of America. Bentsen graduated from the University of Texas School of Law with an LL.B. degree in 1942 and was admitted to the bar, but joined the military for World War II. (When law schools accredited by the American Bar Association began requiring a bachelor's degree for admission to law school in the 1950s and 1960s, law schools began awarding the Juris Doctor degree rather than the LL.B. As with most law school graduates of his era, Bentsen's LL.B. was reissued to reflect award of the J.D.)

== Military service ==
After brief service as a private in intelligence work in Brazil, he trained to be a pilot and in early 1944 began flying combat missions in B-24s from Foggia, Italy, with the 449th Bomb Group. At age 23, he was promoted to major and given command of a squadron of 600 men, overseeing the operations of 15 bombers, their crews, and their maintenance units. He was promoted to lieutenant colonel before being discharged in 1947.

Bentsen flew thirty-five missions against many heavily defended targets, including the Ploiești oil fields in Romania, which were critical to the Nazi war production. The 15th Air Force, which included the 449th Bomb Group, destroyed all petroleum production within its range, eliminating about half of Nazi Germany's sources of fuel. Bentsen's unit also flew against communications centers, aircraft factories and industrial targets in Germany, Italy, Austria, Czechoslovakia, Hungary, Romania, and Bulgaria. Bentsen participated in raids in support of the Anzio campaign and flew missions against targets in preparation for the landing in southern France. He was shot down twice.

Bentsen was awarded the Distinguished Flying Cross, one of the Air Force's highest commendations for achievement or heroism in flight. In addition to the Distinguished Flying Cross, Bentsen was awarded the Air Medal with three Oak Leaf Clusters. Bentsen served in the United States Air Force Reserve from 1950 to 1959, and was promoted to colonel in 1953. (His father, a World War I veteran, served as a major general in the Texas Home Guard during World War II.)

== Early political career ==
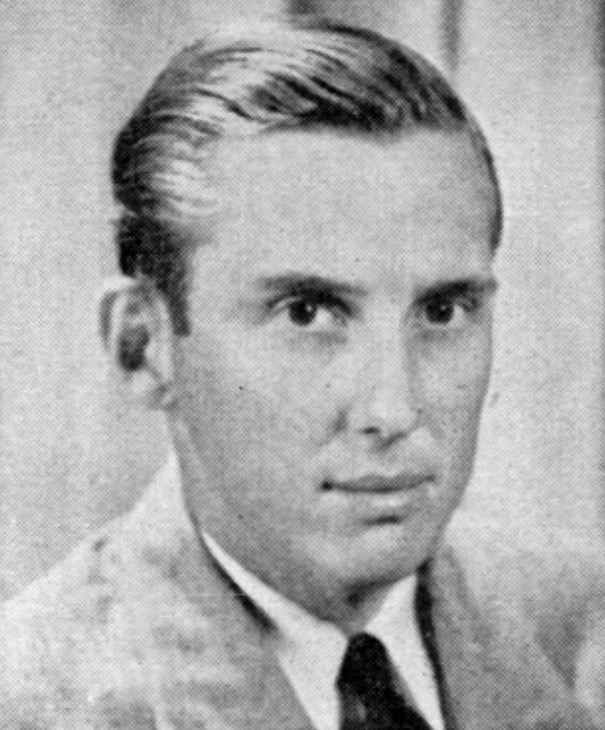
Bentsen as a U.S. Representative in 1953

After the war, Bentsen returned to his native Rio Grande Valley. He served the people of his home area from 1946 to 1948, first as Hidalgo County Judge (a largely administrative post as opposed to a judicial one).

First elected in the Truman landslide of 1948, he served three successive terms in the United States House of Representatives. With the South, including Texas, still mostly home to yellow dog Democrats, winning the Democratic nomination was tantamount to election, and Bentsen was unopposed by Republicans in each of his three House campaigns. He became a protégé of Speaker of the House Sam Rayburn and developed a reputation as an excellent poker player. While serving in Congress at this time, Bentsen was involved in various issues such as those concerning labor and veterans.

A fiscal conservative, Bentsen favored balanced budgets and was not afraid of increasing taxes to achieve them. Consistent with this position, Bentsen was among the most vocal supporters of using increased stimulus spending in order to combat stagflation, believing gains in employment would more effectively reduce the national debt than austerity measures that were being considered by the Ford administration. He balanced liberal positions on taxes and stimulus spending with moderate-to-conservative ones on most social, economic, and foreign policy issues.

Bentsen upset incumbent Ralph Yarborough, a liberal icon, in a bruising primary campaign for the 1970 Texas Democratic Senatorial nomination. The campaign came in the wake of Yarborough's politically hazardous votes in favor of the landmark Civil Rights Act of 1964 and the Voting Rights Act of 1965 and his opposition to the Vietnam War. Bentsen made Yarborough's opposition to the war a major issue. His television advertising featured video images of rioting in the streets at the 1968 Democratic National Convention, implying that Yarborough was associated with the rioters. While this strategy was successful in defeating Yarborough, it caused long-term damage to Bentsen's relationship with liberals in his party.

Bentsen's campaign and his reputation as a centrist Democrat served to alienate him not only from supporters of Yarborough, but from prominent national liberals, as well. Indeed, during the 1970 Senate race, the Keynesian economist John Kenneth Galbraith endorsed the Republican candidate, then U.S. Representative and future president George H. W. Bush, arguing that if Bentsen were elected to the Senate, he would invariably become the face of a new, more moderate-to-conservative Texas Democratic Party and that the long-term interests of Texas liberalism demanded Bentsen's defeat. Nevertheless, Bentsen convincingly won the general election against Bush with 53.5% of the vote.

== Political career ==
=== 1976 presidential campaign ===
Beginning in 1974, Bentsen campaigned for the Democratic presidential nomination. In 1974 he visited 30 states and raised $350,000 at a single fundraiser in Texas. Bentsen formally announced his candidacy on February 17, 1975, and in the early part of that year he had already raised over $1 million for his campaign; only George Wallace of Alabama and Henry M. "Scoop" Jackson of Washington state had raised more money by that point. Bentsen did not organize effectively on a national level, and many observers believed the freshman senator was running without any real hope of winning the nomination, hoping instead to secure a vice-presidential nomination.

Wallace and Jackson were considered to be the two main contenders for the moderate to conservative voters to whom Bentsen would appeal; early in the campaign few foresaw Jimmy Carter of Georgia also effectively appealing to that group. By October 1975, Bentsen, generating little national attention or significance in the polls, scaled back his campaign to a limited effort in areas of 8 to 10 states, hoping for a deadlocked convention. In the first state contest Bentsen vigorously contested, Mississippi, he managed only 1.6% of the vote. Two weeks later Bentsen staked the remainder of his campaign and resources in neighboring Oklahoma but finished third with only 12%. A few days later Bentsen shut down his national campaign, staying in the race only as a favorite son in Texas. In the May 1, 1976, primary, Jimmy Carter won 92 of Texas's 98 delegates. The eventual nominee and president, Carter was later quoted as saying he had expected a much stronger showing by Bentsen but that Bentsen's failure to campaign nationally had ended his hopes.

=== Senate career ===
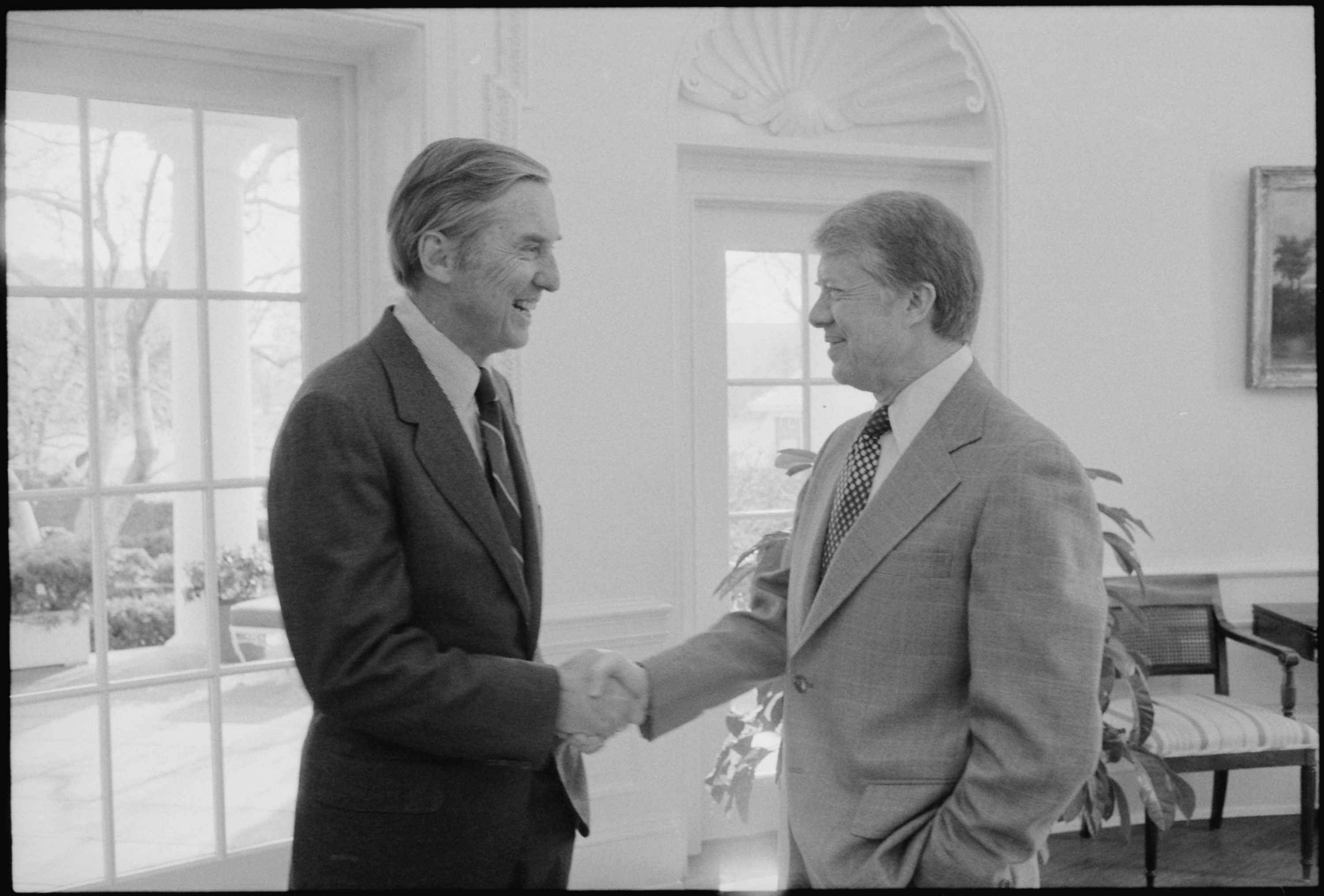
Bentsen meeting with President Jimmy Carter in 1978

Bentsen was overwhelmingly reelected to the Senate in 1976, 1982, and 1988. He defeated sitting Republican congressmen from safe House seats in all four of his Senate elections, including Bush in 1970. In 1976, he ended the career of Alan Steelman of Dallas. In 1982, he defeated James M. Collins of Dallas, who had first dispatched the strongly conservative State Senator Walter Mengden of Houston in the Republican primary. In 1988, he defeated Beau Boulter of Amarillo. Bentsen was also on the ballot as the Democratic vice presidential nominee that year; he could seek both offices under the 1960 "Johnson law" in Texas.

=== 1988 vice presidential campaign ===
Bentsen was briefly thought of as among Walter Mondale's short list of possible vice presidential candidates in 1984. In the end, Mondale chose New York U.S. Representative Geraldine Ferraro as his running mate.

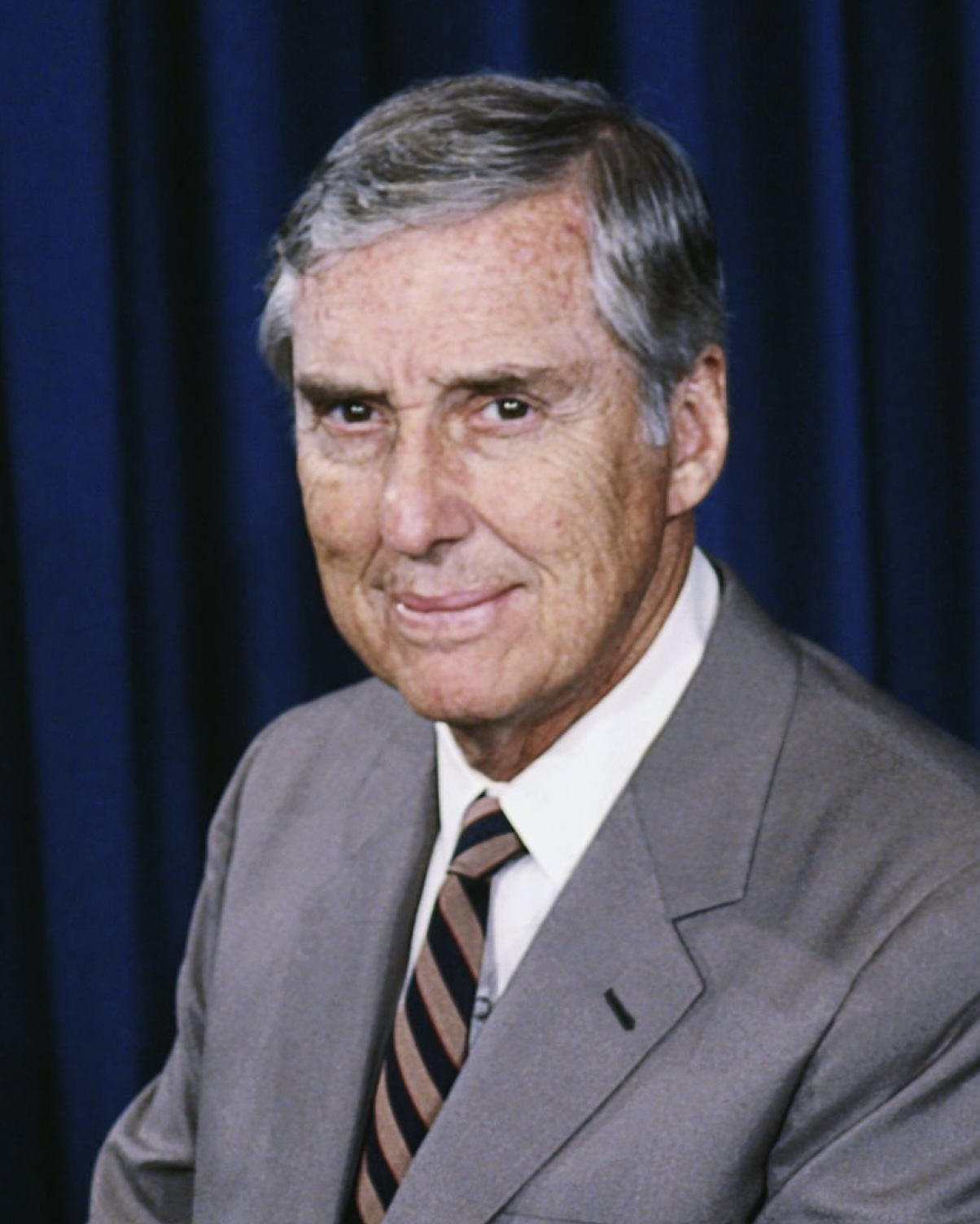
Official portrait, 1984

In 1988, Governor Michael Dukakis of Massachusetts chose Bentsen to be his running mate in that year's presidential election, beating out Ohio Senator John Glenn, who was considered the early favorite. Bentsen was selected in large part to try to lure away the state of Texas and its electoral vote for the Democrats, even with fellow Texan George H. W. Bush at the top of the Republican ticket. Because of Bentsen's status as something of an elder statesman who was more experienced in electoral politics, many believed Dukakis's selection of Bentsen as his running mate was a mistake in that Bentsen, number two on the ticket, appeared more presidential than did Dukakis. During the vice presidential debate (see below), Republican vice presidential nominee Dan Quayle spent most of his speaking time criticizing Dukakis as too liberal while avoiding a match up with the seasoned Bentsen. One elector in West Virginia even cast a ballot for him rather than Dukakis, giving Bentsen one electoral vote for president.

Bentsen was responsible for one of the most widely discussed moments of the campaign during the vice presidential televised debate with fellow Senator Dan Quayle. In answering a question about his experience, Quayle stated that he had as much political experience as John F. Kennedy had when he ran for the presidency. Bentsen, at the age of 67, retorted, "Senator, I served with Jack Kennedy. I knew Jack Kennedy. Jack Kennedy was a friend of mine. Senator, you're no Jack Kennedy." Quayle replied, "That was really uncalled for, Senator." Bentsen responded, "You're the one that was making the comparison, Senator." Peter Goldman and Tom Mathews wrote in The Quest for the Presidency 1988 that Bentsen "was the forgotten man" of the campaign until the exchange with Quayle. Thereafter, his "gray solidity" was "made luminescent by the pallor of the other three men", and questions were raised as to how well Bentsen really knew Kennedy. Some stated that they only had a nodding acquaintance. Bentsen had in fact considered in advance how to respond, because Congressman Dennis E. Eckart, who played Quayle in Bentsen's rehearsals, knew that Quayle had previously compared himself to Kennedy, so he worked it into Bentsen's debate preparation. Quayle had been prepped by Senator Bob Packwood, as Packwood served with Bentsen on the Senate Finance Committee.

The Dukakis-Bentsen ticket lost the election. Bentsen was unable to swing his home state, with 43 percent of the Texas vote going for the Dukakis ticket while Bush and Quayle took 56 percent; however, he was simultaneously reelected to the United States Senate with 59 percent of the vote. Bentsen considered running for president in the 1992 presidential election, but he, along with many other Democrats, backed out because of Bush's apparent popularity following the 1991 Gulf War. A poor economy in 1991–1992 eroded Bush's standing among voters and he ended up losing the election to Bill Clinton.

=== Secretary of the Treasury ===
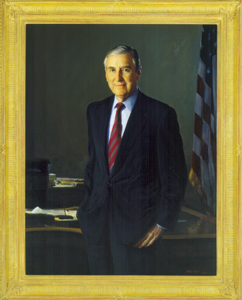
Official portrait as Secretary of the Treasury

Appointed to Clinton's cabinet as Secretary of the Treasury, Bentsen helped win crucial Republican votes to pass the North American Free Trade Agreement (NAFTA) and the Uruguay Round of the General Agreement on Tariffs and Trade (GATT). Bentsen also was pivotal in winning passage of the 1994 crime bill and the Federal Assault Weapon Ban, which temporarily banned assault rifles.

After the resignation of Les Aspin in early 1994, Bentsen was seriously considered for the position of Secretary of Defense. But this prospect did not materialize, and William Perry, then Deputy Secretary of Defense, was chosen to succeed Aspin. In early December 1994, Bentsen announced his retirement as Secretary of the Treasury. Before election day he had discussed with President Clinton that he was not prepared to stay in office through the end of Clinton's first term in 1997. He was succeeded in the position by Robert Rubin.

== Later life and death ==
In 1995, former British Prime Minister Margaret Thatcher said in an interview with Larry King when asked which Democrats she admired: "I like Lloyd Bentsen very much indeed, I was sad when he resigned. He's a real marvelous politician, a person of great dignity, a person we can look up to, respect and like as well."

In 1998, Bentsen experienced two strokes, which left him needing a wheelchair. In 1999, President Clinton awarded Bentsen the Presidential Medal of Freedom, one of the nation's highest honors given to civilians. Clinton singled out Bentsen for applause during his final State of the Union address in 2000, saying: "In 1993 we began to put our fiscal house in order with the Deficit Reduction Act, which you'll all remember won passages in both Houses by just a single vote. Your former colleague, my first Secretary of the Treasury, led that effort and sparked our long boom. He's here with us tonight. Lloyd Bentsen, you have served America well, and we thank you." Bentsen appeared in the summer of 2004 at the portrait unveilings at the White House of Clinton and former First Lady Senator Hillary Clinton.

Bentsen died on May 23, 2006, at his home in Houston at the age of 85, from stroke-related complications. He was survived by his wife, the former Beryl Ann Longino, three children, and seven grandchildren. His memorial service was held on May 30 at the First Presbyterian Church of Houston, where Bentsen and his wife had been members for many years, and was presided over by his then-pastor, William Vanderbloemen. He is interred in Forest Park Lawndale Cemetery in Houston. Former president Clinton delivered a eulogy.

== Legacy ==
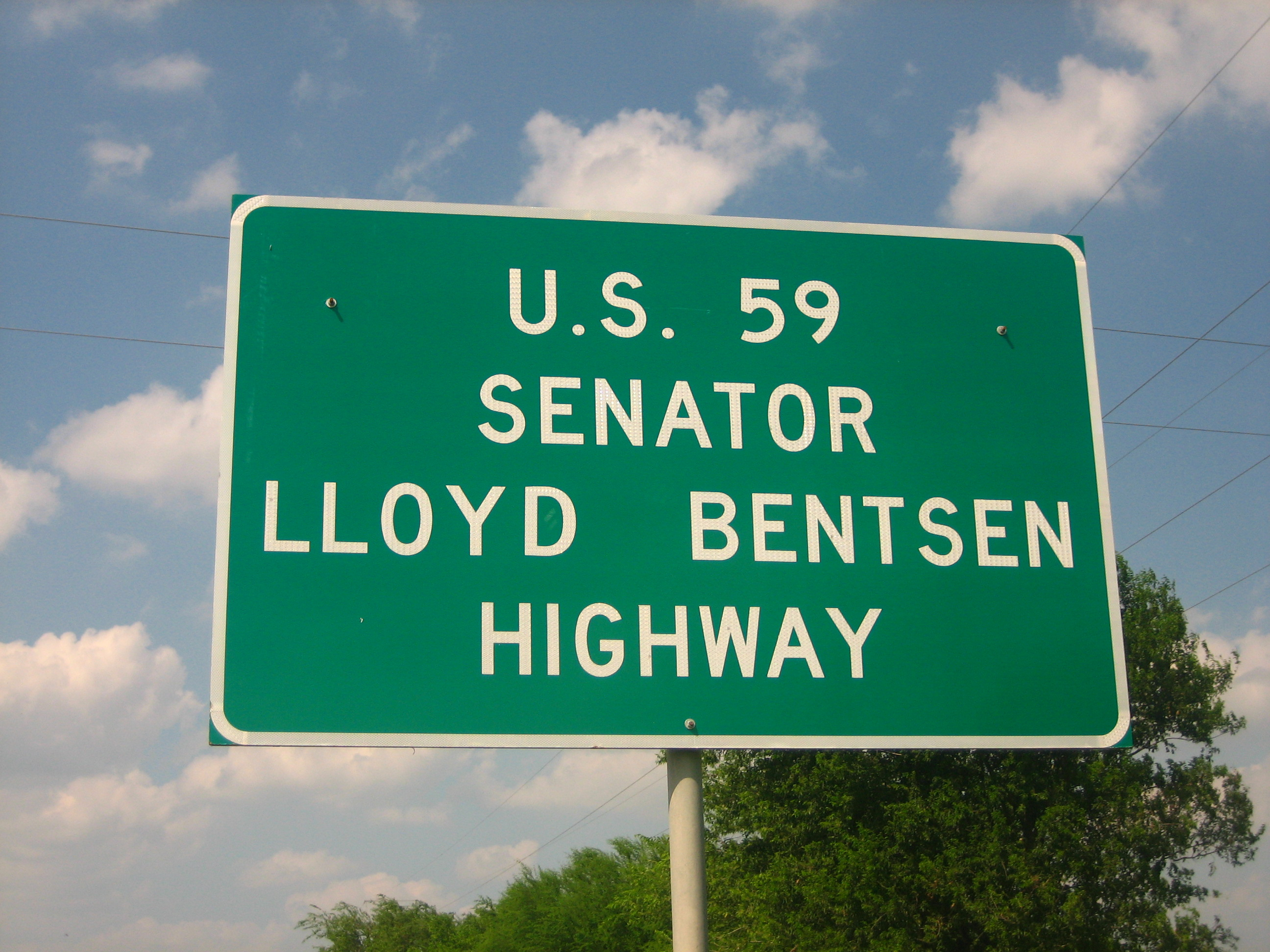
Bentsen Highway

As a freshman Senator, Bentsen guided to passage the Employee Retirement Income Security Act (ERISA), a long-stalled pension reform bill providing federal protections for the pensions of American workers. He also championed the creation of Individual Retirement Accounts (IRAs), legislation improving access to health care for low income women and children, and tax incentives for independent oil and gas producers to reduce dependence on foreign oil. In recognition of his success in securing federal funding, two hundred seventy miles of U.S. Highway 59, from I-35 to I-45 in Texas (between Laredo and Houston, respectively), are officially named Senator Lloyd Bentsen Highway.

As a primary architect of the Clinton economic plan, Bentsen contributed to a $500 billion reduction in the deficit, launching the longest period of economic growth since World War II. More than five million new jobs were created during his tenure as secretary. His legacy also includes many water, wastewater and other infrastructure projects in the impoverished colonias of south Texas, the preservation of natural areas across the state, and major funding for numerous medical facilities. Bentsen's retort to Vice President Dan Quayle during the 1988 vice presidential debate, "You're no Jack Kennedy", has entered the lexicon as a widely used phrase to deflate politicians who are perceived as thinking too highly of themselves. Bentsen is also known for coining the term astroturfing.

Bentsen's family continues to be active in politics. His nephew, Ken Bentsen, was a U.S. Representative (D) from 1995 to 2003 in Texas's 25th District, and a U.S. Senate candidate in 2002. His grandson, Lloyd Bentsen IV was a senior research fellow for the National Center for Policy Analysis in Dallas. On January 22, 2009, the Senator Lloyd and B. A. Bentsen Stroke Research Center officially opened in the Fayez S. Sarofim Research Building in the medical district of Houston, Texas, as part of the University of Texas Health Science Center of Houston. Notable speakers included Dr. Cheng Chi Lee and Houston Mayor Bill White.

== Electoral history ==
U.S. House of Representatives
| Preceded by Milton West | Member of the U.S. House of Representatives from Texas's 15th congressional district 1948–1955 | Succeeded by Joe M. Kilgore |
Honorary titles
| Preceded by George W. Sarbacher Jr. | Baby of the House; 1948–1949 | Succeeded by Hugo Sims |
Party political offices
| Preceded by Ralph Yarborough | Democratic nominee for U.S. Senator from Texas (Class 1); 1970, 1976, 1982, 1988 | Succeeded by Bob Krueger |
| Preceded by Mike Mansfield | Response to the State of the Union address 1972; Served alongside: Carl Albert, Hale Boggs, John Brademas, Frank Church, Thomas Eagleton, Martha Griffiths, John Melcher, Ralph Metcalfe, William Proxmire, Leonor Sullivan | Vacant Title next held by Mike Mansfield |
| Preceded by Fritz Hollings | Chair of the Democratic Senatorial Campaign Committee; 1973–1976 | Succeeded by J. Bennett Johnston |
| Preceded by Wendell H. Ford | Chair of the Democratic Senatorial Campaign Committee; 1983–1985 | Succeeded by George J. Mitchell |
| Preceded by Geraldine Ferraro | Democratic nominee for Vice President of the United States; 1988 | Succeeded by Al Gore |
| Preceded by Robert Byrd; Jim Wright | Response to the State of the Union address 1989; Served alongside: Jim Wright | Succeeded by Tom Foley |
U.S. Senate
| Preceded by Ralph Yarborough | U.S. Senator (Class 1) from Texas; 1971–1993; Served alongside: John Tower, Phil Gramm | Succeeded by Bob Krueger |
| Preceded by Bob Packwood | Chair of the Senate Finance Committee; 1987–1993 | Succeeded by Pat Moynihan |
Political offices
| Preceded by Nicholas F. Brady | United States Secretary of the Treasury; 1993–1994 | Succeeded by Robert Rubin |
