= 1933 United States House of Representatives elections =

There were ten special elections to the United States House of Representatives in 1933, to both the 72nd United States Congress and the 73rd United States Congress.

== 72nd United States Congress ==
District	Incumbent			This race	
District	Member	Party	First elected	Results	Candidates
Texas 8	Daniel E. Garrett	Democratic	1920	Incumbent died December 13, 1932. New member elected January 28, 1933. Democratic hold.	▌ ✓ Joe H. Eagle (Democratic) 55.0%; ▌Chester H. Bryan (Democratic) 15.2%; ▌Robert L. Cole (Democratic) 13.4%; ▌Charles Murphy (Democratic) 4.1%; ▌Allen V. Peden (Democratic) 2.9%; Others: ▌W. Ray Scruggs (Democratic) 1.4%; ▌Clarence R. Miller (Democratic) 1.2%; ▌J. Dixie Smith (Democratic) 1.1%

== 73rd United States Congress ==
District	Incumbent			This race	
District	Member	Party	First elected	Results	Candidates
Texas 15	John Nance Garner	Democratic	1902	Incumbent resigned March 3, 1933 to become U.S. Vice President. New member elected April 22, 1933. Democratic hold.	▌ ✓ Milton H. West (Democratic) 91.2%; ▌Carlos G. Watson (Republican) 8.8%
Texas 7	Clay S. Briggs	Democratic	1918	Incumbent died April 29, 1933. New member elected June 24, 1933. Democratic hold.	▌ ✓ Clark W. Thompson (Democratic) 24.2%; ▌James D. Pickett (Democratic) 17.5%; ▌Nat Patton (Democratic) 16.8%; ▌Theodore B. Stubbs (Democratic) 14.9%; ▌R. E. Biggs (Democratic) 8.7%; ▌Jake B. Clegg (Democratic) 7.3%; ▌Julian Greer (Democratic) 4.9%; ▌Thomas H. Dent (Republican) 4.5%; ▌Nall Colson (Democratic) 1.2%
Georgia 10	Charles H. Brand	Democratic	1932	Incumbent died May 17, 1933. New member elected July 5, 1933. Democratic hold.	▌ ✓ Paul Brown (Democratic) 67.7%; ▌William P. Congdon (Democratic) 10.1%; ▌James L. Cartledge (Democratic) 8.1%; ▌Roy V. Harris (Democratic) 7.8%; ▌A. Dwight Deas (Independent) 3.1%; ▌Hoke O'Kelley (Democratic) 1.7%; ▌D. Talmadge Bowers (Independent) 1.0%
Arizona at-large	Lewis W. Douglas	Democratic	1926	Incumbent resigned March 4, 1933 to become Director of the Office of Management and Budget. New member elected October 3, 1933. Democratic hold.	▌ ✓ Isabella Greenway (Democratic) 73.6%; ▌Dillworth E. Sumpter (Socialist) 16.9%; ▌H. B. Wilkinson (Republican) 9.5%
Pennsylvania 9	Henry W. Watson	Republican	1914	Incumbent died August 27, 1933. New member elected November 7, 1933. Democratic gain.	▌ ✓ Oliver W. Frey (Democratic) 94.1%; ▌Walter L. Huhn (Socialist) 5.9%
Alabama 8	Edward B. Almon	Democratic	1914	Incumbent died June 22, 1933. New member elected November 14, 1933. Democratic hold.	▌ ✓ Archibald H. Carmichael (Democratic); Unopposed
West Virginia 3	Lynn Hornor	Democratic	1930	Incumbent died September 23, 1933. New member elected November 28, 1933. Democratic hold.	▌ ✓ Andrew Edmiston Jr. (Democratic) 54.7%; ▌Howard Gore (Republican) 44.5%
Louisiana 6	Bolivar E. Kemp	Democratic	1924	Incumbent died June 19, 1933. New member elected December 5, 1933. Democratic hold. Election contested by Jared Y. Sanders Jr., with the House of Representatives ruling the seat vacant on January 29, 1934.	▌ ✓ Lallie Kemp (Democratic); Uncontested
Arkansas 5	Heartsill Ragon	Democratic	1922	Incumbent resigned June 16, 1933 to become judge of the U.S. District Court for the Western District of Arkansas; New member elected December 19, 1933. Democratic hold.	▌ ✓ David D. Terry (Democratic); Unopposed
New York 34	John D. Clarke	Republican	1926	Incumbent died November 5, 1933. New member elected December 28, 1933. Republican hold.	▌ ✓ Marian W. Clarke (Republican) 54.7%; ▌John J. Burns (Democratic) 37.6%; ▌David E. Hartshorn (Prohibition) 7.7%
