= Alexander W. Gregg =

American politician (1855–1919)

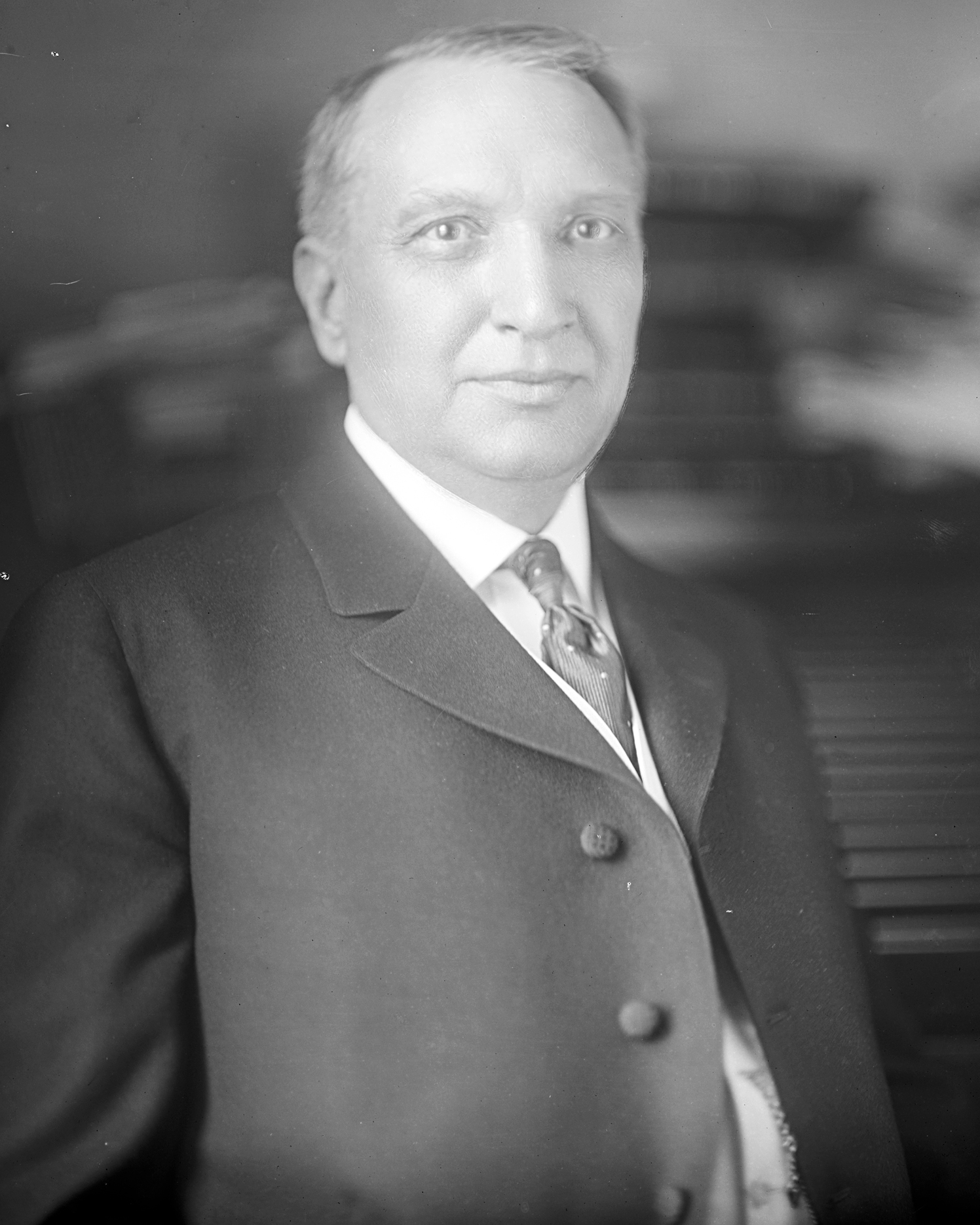
- Harris & Ewing photo, circa 1918

Member of the U.S. House of Representatives from Texas's 7th district
- In office March 4, 1903 – March 3, 1919
- Preceded by: Robert Lee Henry
- Succeeded by: Clay Stone Briggs

Member of the Texas Senate from the 7th district
- In office January 11, 1887 – January 8, 1889

Personal details
- Born: January 31, 1855 Centerville, Texas, U.S.
- Died: April 30, 1919 (aged 64) Palestine, Texas, U.S.
- Party: Democratic
- Occupation: Politician, lawyer

Alexander White Gregg (January 31, 1855 – April 30, 1919) was an American politician and lawyer. He was a Democratic member of the United States House of Representatives between 1903 and 1919.

== Life and career ==
Alexander White Gregg was born on January 31, 1855, in Centerville, Texas, to parents Susan C. and James W. Gregg. As a child, he went to a public school. His father was killed in the American Civil War, and his mother remarried; during this time Alexander was moved to Mississippi to live with his aunt.

He attended King College (now King University) at Bristol, Tennessee, graduating in 1874; and later studied law at the University of Virginia at Charlottesville.

He was admitted to the Texas bar in 1878 and commenced practice in Palestine, Texas. Gregg served in the Texas Senate, District 7 between 1886 and 1888. He ran for Texas's 7th congressional district, and held a seat there between 1903–1919. He served as chairman of the Committee on War Claims (1913–1919). He did not run for re-election in 1918 and died a month after his term ended in Palestine, Texas, and is buried in East Hill Cemetery.

Gregg has a historical marker located at his former home in Palestine, Texas and dedicated in his honor, erected in 1970 by the Texas State Historical Survey Committee.

U.S. House of Representatives
Preceded by Robert Lee Henry	Member of the U.S. House of Representatives from Texas's 7th congressional district 1903–1919	Succeeded by Clay Stone Briggs
Political offices
Preceded by Thetus W. Sims; Tennessee	Chairman of House War Claims Committee; 1913–1919	Succeeded by Benjamin K. Focht; Pennsylvania
