= Southside Place, Texas =

- City
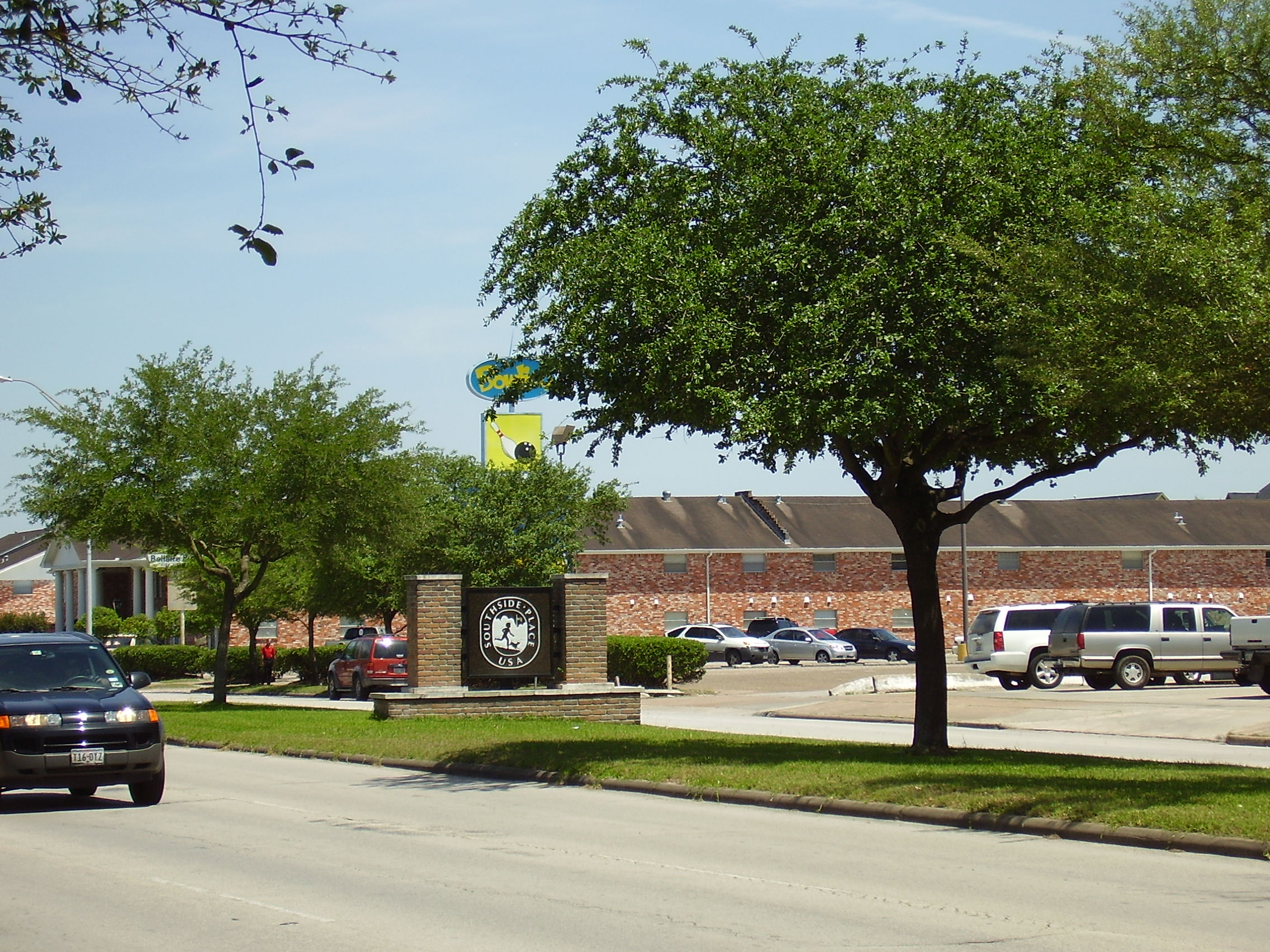
- A sign with Southside Place's logo

- Location in Harris County and the state of Texas
- Coordinates: 29°42′35″N 95°26′8″W
- Country: United States
- State: Texas
- County: Harris

Area
  - Total: 0.25 sq mi (0.65 km^{2})
  - Land: 0.25 sq mi (0.65 km^{2})
  - Water: 0 sq mi (0.00 km^{2})
- Elevation: 49 ft (15 m)

Population (2020)
  - Total: 1,835
  - Density: 7,550/sq mi (2,917/km^{2})
- Time zone: UTC-6 (Central (CST))
  - Summer (DST): UTC-5 (CDT)
- ZIP Code: 77005
- Area codes: 281/346/713/832
- FIPS code: 48-69272
- GNIS feature ID: 1347529
- Website: www.southsideplacetx.gov

Southside Place is a city in west central Harris County, Texas, United States. The population was 1,835 at the 2020 census.

As of the 2000 census, Southside Place is the 13th wealthiest location in Texas by per capita income.

Southside Place functions as a bedroom community for upper-middle- and upper-class families. Many businesses are located in Southside Place; all are along Bellaire Boulevard.

The United States Postal Service uses "Houston" for all Southside Place addresses; "Southside Place, TX" is not an acceptable postal city name for mail addressed to locations in the city.

== History ==
Southside Place opened on Easter Day in 1925. Edlo L. Crain, the developer, placed a pool and a park in a subdivision to attract residents to the townsite. The first section to open was south of the park. It was in proximity to Bellaire Boulevard and the streetcar line, which was nicknamed the "Toonerville Trolley". In 1926, development of the second section of Southside Place, which spanned from Harper Street to University Boulevard, began. The Great Depression slowed development. The site of Southside Place previously housed the Harris County Poor Farm. The Haden and Austin company had purchased the poor farm and, after a period, sold it to the E. L. Crain and Company.

Southside Place incorporated in June 1931, with 600 residents. The city council first met on June 15 of that year. On August 3, 1934 the city council passed a resolution that declared Southside Place an incorporated city. Because of the incorporation, Houston did not incorporate Southside Place's territory into its city limits, while Houston annexed surrounding areas that were unincorporated. A post office opened in 1940. Before World War II, the population stabilized at approximately 1,400. In the 1960s, the city reached a high of 1,500 residents. By 1979, the number of residents fell to 1,263. In 1988, the city had 1,560 residents. In 1990 the city had 1,384 residents.

In early 2009, Southside Place announced that it would demolish its previous municipal buildings and build a new multi-story municipal complex.

Glenn "Pat" Patterson is to serve as mayor until May 2021. There will be a mayoral election on May 1, 2021; Patterson will not seek reelection. Savvas T. Stefanides and Andy Chan are the candidates; the latter moved to Southside Place in 2004.

== Geography ==
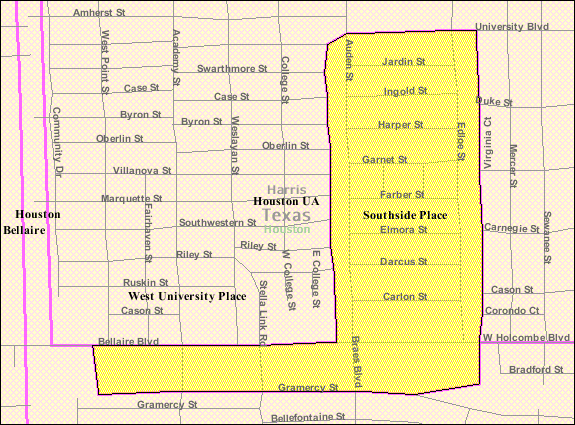
Map of Southside Place

Southside Place is located at 29°42′35″N 95°26′8″W (29.709629, –95.435442). According to the United States Census Bureau, the city has a total area of 0.2 square miles (0.6 km^{2}), all of it land. The city is surrounded by the cities of Bellaire, Houston, and West University Place.

The Blair House, a two-story, red-brick, 183-unit apartment complex, opened in 1963 and was on a 4.2-acre (1.7 ha) site. As the value of land rose in Southside Place, pressure came to redevelop the land. The complex close on September 11, 2015 and was bulldozed in November of that year. Trammell Crow Residential built the four-story, 269-unit Sinclear Apartments Southside Place in its place.

A portion of Braeswood Place, Blocks 1 and 2 of Braes Heights Section 1, is in Southside Place. The rest is in the City of Houston.

== Demographics ==
Historical population
Census	Pop.	Note	%±
1970	1,466		—
1980	1,366		−6.8%
1990	1,392		1.9%
2000	1,546		11.1%
2010	1,715		10.9%
2020	1,835		7.0%
U.S. Decennial Census

=== Racial and ethnic composition ===
Southside Place city, Texas – Racial and ethnic composition Note: the US Census treats Hispanic/Latino as an ethnic category. This table excludes Latinos from the racial categories and assigns them to a separate category. Hispanics/Latinos may be of any race.
Race / Ethnicity (NH = Non-Hispanic)	Pop 2000	Pop 2010	Pop 2020	% 2000	% 2010	% 2020
White alone (NH)	1,343	1,229	1,230	86.87%	71.66%	67.03%
Black or African American alone (NH)	16	43	63	1.03%	2.51%	3.43%
Native American or Alaska Native alone (NH)	0	3	0	0.00%	0.17%	0.00%
Asian alone (NH)	64	261	238	4.14%	15.22%	12.97%
Native Hawaiian or Pacific Islander alone (NH)	0	0	0	0.00%	0.00%	0.00%
Other race alone (NH)	6	7	3	0.39%	0.41%	0.16%
Mixed race or Multiracial (NH)	17	35	100	1.10%	2.04%	5.45%
Hispanic or Latino (any race)	100	137	201	6.47%	7.99%	10.95%
Total	1,546	1,715	1,835	100.00%	100.00%	100.00%

=== 2020 census ===
As of the 2020 census, Southside Place had a population of 1,835. The median age was 38.4 years, with 23.1% of residents under the age of 18 and 14.4% of residents 65 years of age or older. For every 100 females there were 92.3 males, and for every 100 females age 18 and over there were 88.6 males age 18 and over.

100.0% of residents lived in urban areas, while 0.0% lived in rural areas.

There were 735 households in Southside Place, of which 36.2% had children under the age of 18 living in them. Of all households, 57.0% were married-couple households, 13.1% were households with a male householder and no spouse or partner present, and 26.0% were households with a female householder and no spouse or partner present. About 25.8% of all households were made up of individuals and 3.0% had someone living alone who was 65 years of age or older.

There were 787 housing units, of which 6.6% were vacant. The homeowner vacancy rate was 0.9% and the rental vacancy rate was 6.5%.

Racial composition as of the 2020 census
Race	Number	Percent
White	1,268	69.1%
Black or African American	65	3.5%
American Indian and Alaska Native	5	0.3%
Asian	238	13.0%
Native Hawaiian and Other Pacific Islander	1	0.1%
Some other race	23	1.3%
Two or more races	235	12.8%
Hispanic or Latino (of any race)	201	11.0%

=== 2000 census ===
As of the census of 2000, there were 1,546 people, 618 households, and 370 families residing in the city. The population density was 6,270.9 inhabitants per square mile (2,421.2/km^{2}). There were 647 housing units at an average density of 2,624.4 per square mile (1,013.3/km^{2}). The racial makeup of the city was 91.72% White, 1.03% African American, 4.14% Asian, 1.81% from other races, and 1.29% from two or more races. Hispanic or Latino of any race were 6.47% of the population.

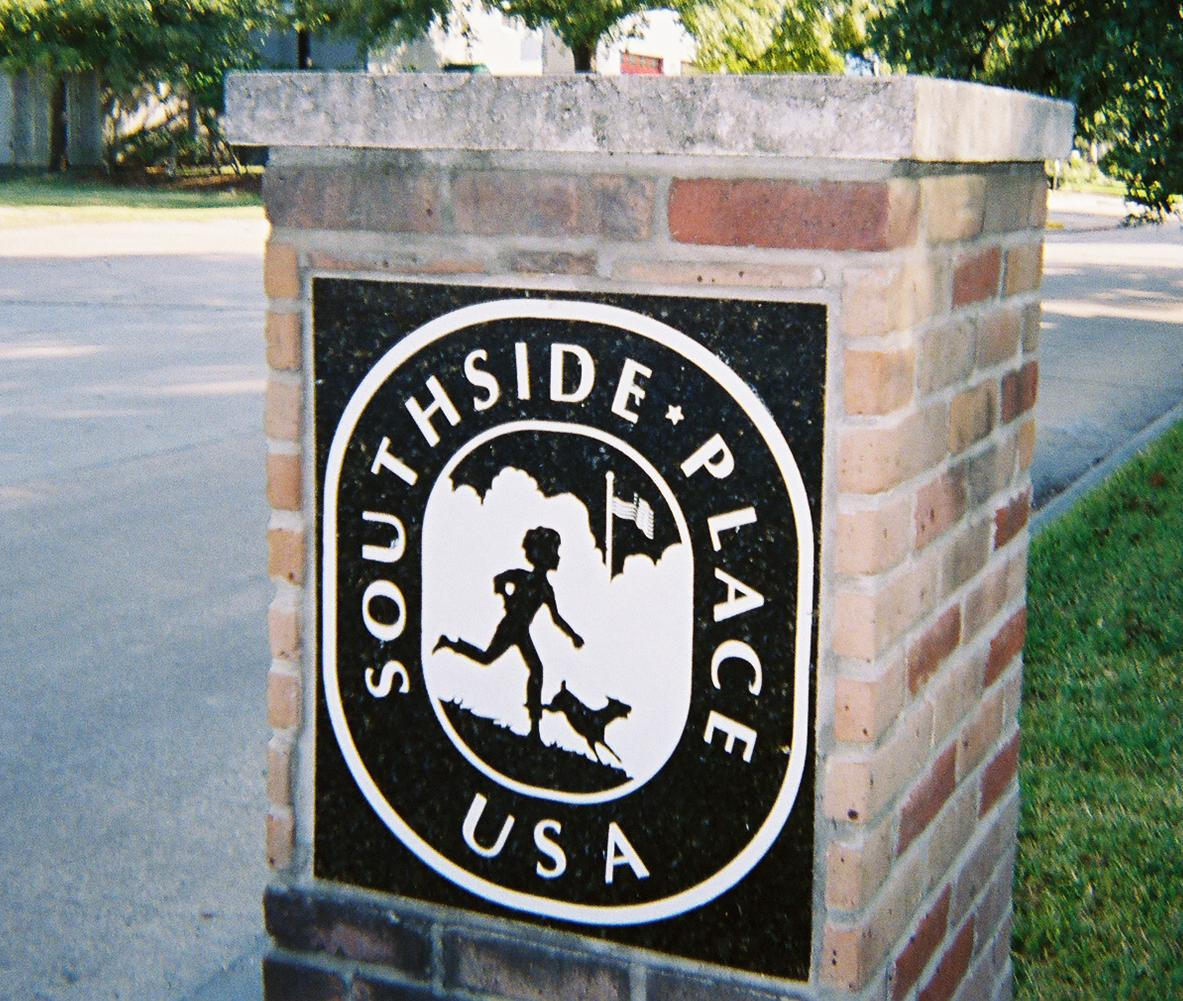
A marker indicating the city of Southside Place

There were 618 households, out of which 40.9% had children under the age of 18 living with them, 53.2% were married couples living together, 5.5% had a female householder with no husband present, and 40.1% were non-families. 38.5% of all households were made up of individuals, and 18.3% had someone living alone who was 65 years of age or older. The average household size was 2.50 and the average family size was 3.44.

In the city, the population was spread out, with 33.2% under the age of 18, 3.2% from 18 to 24, 26.1% from 25 to 44, 26.3% from 45 to 64, and 11.2% who were 65 years of age or older. The median age was 39 years. For every 100 females, there were 91.3 males. For every 100 females age 18 and over, there were 82.7 males.

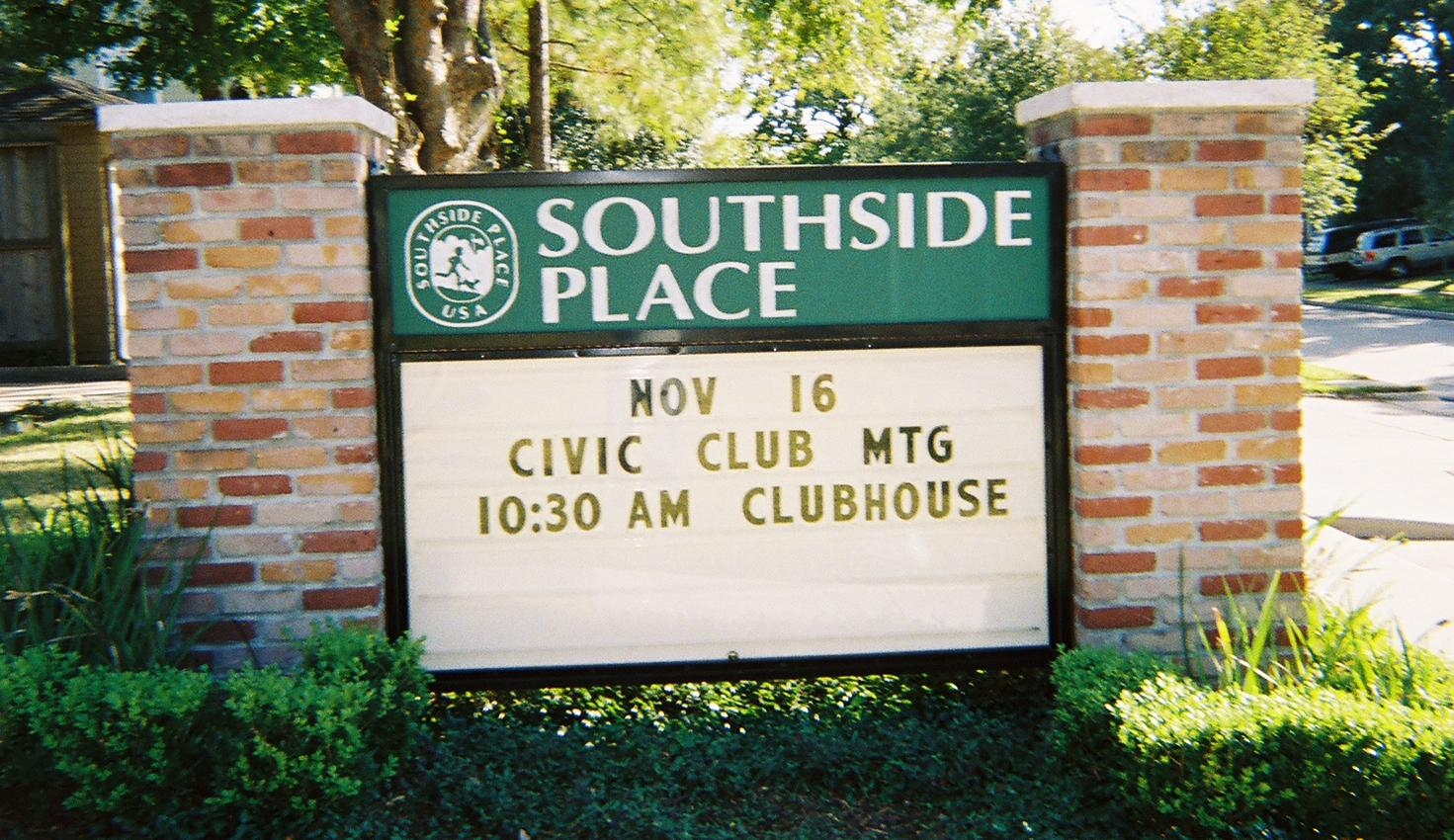
A billboard owned by the city of Southside Place

The median income for a household in the city was $81,267, and the median income for a family was $163,303. Males had a median income of $100,000 versus $48,654 for females. The per capita income for the city was $57,021. About 3.3% of families and 5.3% of the population were below the poverty line, including 2.7% of those under age 18 and 12.7% of those age 65 or over.

== Government ==
=== Local government ===
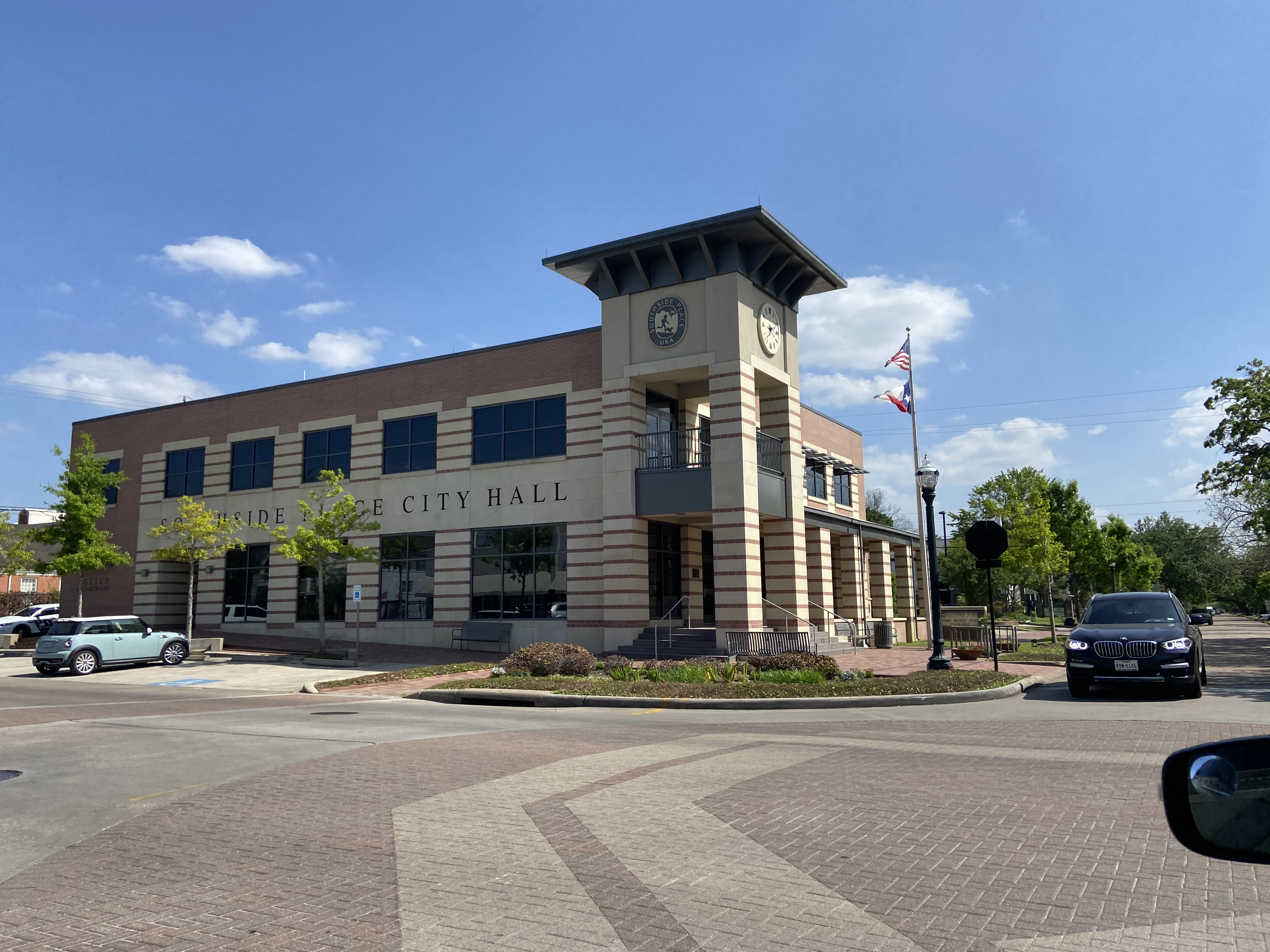
Southside Place city hall

Southside Place's city council meets on the second Tuesday of each month. The mayor and the city council are elected for two-year terms. Two and three vacancies are on the council on alternate years. Elections are held during the first Saturday in each May. Any qualified voter may be placed on the ballot for Mayor or a city council position. The Mayor and each council member receive a one U.S. dollar per year salary in accordance with a Texas state law which requires all city officials to receive a salary. As of 2021 the mayor is Andy Chan. Glenn ‘Pat’ Patterson preceded him. Melissa Byers, Jennifer Anderson, Dr. Melissa Knop, Douglas Corbett and Brad Stollberg are the city council members.

The Southside Place Police Department is a 24-hour police organization that provides police services to the City of Southside Place. The Chief of Police is D.H. McCall and employs 12 sworn Texas Peace Officers. The Southside Place Police and Fire Departments are headquartered along with the city administration at 6309 Edloe Avenue. The Fire Department is a two engine company house. All of its members are volunteers. The Fire Chief is Ulysses Serrano. It has a mutual aid agreement with the cities of West University Place and Bellaire.

The nearest public hospital is Ben Taub General Hospital in the Texas Medical Center.

=== Federal and state representation ===
Southside Place is in Harris County Precinct 1. As of 2022, Rodney Ellis serves as the commissioner of the precincts.

Southside Place is located in District 134 of the Texas House of Representatives. As of 2021 Ann Johnson represents the district. Southside Place is within District 17 of the Texas Senate.

Southside Place is in Texas's 7th congressional district; as of 2019 Lizzie Fletcher is the representative.

== Economy ==
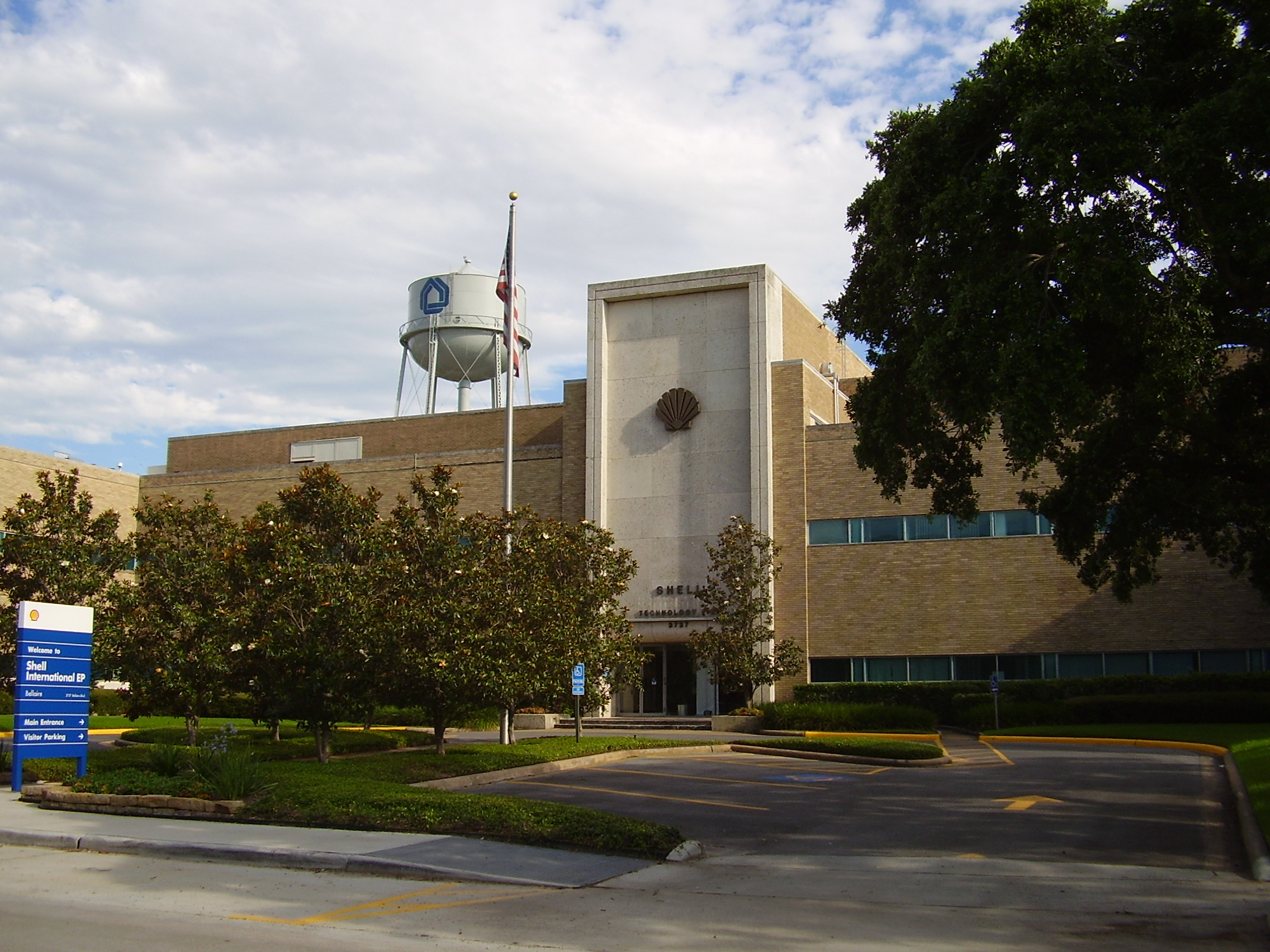
Shell Oil Company Bellaire Technology Center

The Braes Heights Shopping Center, a two-story mid-century modern shopping center, is located in Southside Place. In 2012 the Houston Press ranked the center the "Best Strip Mall - 2012" due to its abundance of small businesses that made the editors feel nostalgic. The editors said "In many ways, Braes Heights seems more like Rice Village than Rice Village" because many iconic small businesses had left Rice Village by 2012.

Shell Oil Company's Bellaire Technology Center had been located in Southside Place. The 310,000-square-foot (29,000 m^{2}) facility opened as a geophysical processing center in 1936. For decades many scientists and engineers discovered and studied facts related to oil and natural gas. In 2008 Shell announced that it would close the Bellaire facility and expand the Westhollow Technology Center in Houston to accommodate most of the staff employed by the Bellaire center, while some staff would go to the Woodcreek Technology Campus in western Houston. Shell said that it closed the Bellaire facility partly because two thirds of the land was leased, and the lease was set to expire in 2010. The move decreased tax revenue into the City of Southside Place; the city rezoned the parcel for various land uses.

The Palace Bowling Lanes bowling alley, a two-story, 80,000-square-foot (7,400 m^{2}) structure that was built in 1955, was on a 2.8-acre (1.1 ha) plot of land in Southside Place. In October 2016 the owners sold the alley, which had been renamed Bowl on Bellaire but still had signage reading "Palace Bowling Lanes", to Sparkle Frame, and that group closed the business later that month. In September 2018 the real estate firm Triple Crown Investments stated that it would remodel the building into the Southside Commons complex, and Arch-Con Construction will be the construction company. A bowling alley, restaurants, 10,000 square feet (930 m^{2}) of retail space, and other entertainment facilities will be on the first floor; the restaurant and entertainment businesses would take up a total of 30,000 square feet (2,800 m^{2}) of space. Offices, including medical and non-medical purposes, occupying 40,000 square feet (3,700 m^{2}) are to go on the second floor. .

== Education ==
=== Primary and secondary education ===
The city is served by Houston Independent School District. The community is within Trustee District V.

Pupils who live in Southside Place north of Bellaire Boulevard are zoned to West University Elementary School in West University Place, and people who live in Southside Place south of Bellaire Boulevard are zoned to Mark Twain Elementary School in the Braeswood Place neighborhood of Houston. All Southside Place pupils are zoned to Pershing Middle School in Braeswood Place in Houston; any student zoned to Pershing may apply to Pin Oak Middle School (in Bellaire)'s regular program. Pupils in Southside Place who are west of Stella Link and south of Bellaire Boulevard are zoned to Bellaire High School in Bellaire, while all other pupils in Southside Place are zoned to Mirabeau B. Lamar High School (in Upper Kirby), also in Houston.

Gabriela Mistral Early Childhood Center is the closest early childhood center to the city of Southside Place. Since only poor students, homeless students, students who are not proficient in English, or children of active-duty members of the U.S. military or whose parent has been killed, injured, or missing in action while on active duty may be enrolled tuition-free in HISD preschools, most Southside Place residents rely on private preschools. Students who are eligible for HISD's preschools may attend any Early Childhood Center in Houston ISD.

Nearby is the Roman Catholic Archdiocese of Galveston-Houston's St. Vincent de Paul Catholic School (K–8).

=== Community colleges ===
The Texas Legislature designated Houston Community College System (HCC) as serving Houston ISD (including Southside Place).

=== Public libraries ===
Southside Place is near three public libraries. Harris County Public Library system operates a branch in West University Place. The Houston Public Library system operates the McGovern-Stella Link Branch in Braeswood Place and in Houston. The city of Bellaire also operates its own library.

== Parks and recreation ==
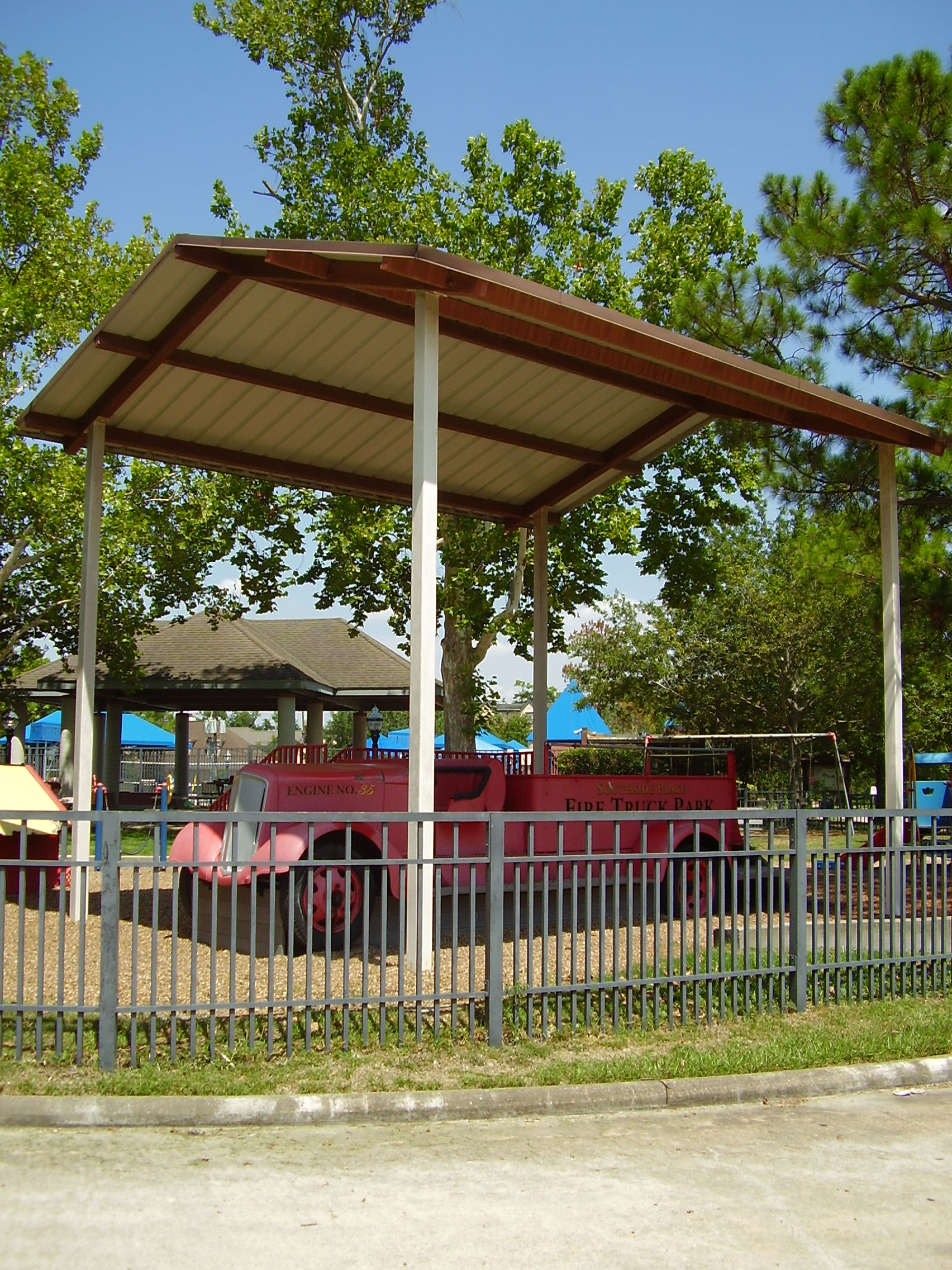
Fire Truck Park

The park and pool facilities are operated by the Southside Place Park Association, which is not affiliated with the City of Southside Place. The SPPA is governed by a seven-member Board of Directors and managed by two paid employees.

The park/pool area is located between Auden and Edloe on the streets of Garnet and Farbar. Facilities include a park, tennis courts, baseball field, basketball court, swimming pool and clubhouse. Only the park, field and basketball court are open for public use. Use of the tennis court, pool and clubhouse require a park membership. Annual membership is $425 and is open to residents of Southside Place. Approx. 80% of Southside Place residents are also park members. The clubhouse is home to a summer camp that is run by the Parks Department. The park staff consists of 1 full-time Parks/Recreation Director, 1 part-time clubhouse manager, 30+ camp staff members, 2 assistant pool managers, 2 swim lessons instructors and 35 Red Cross certified Life Guards. The pool is also home to a 150+ member swim team that competes with other pools in the Houston area. Swim team season runs from mid-May through the end of June. The Parks Director is Alysa Harrison. On April 12, 2025, The Texas Historical Commission unveiled a plaque honoring the 100th anniversary of Southside Place being a city.

The Weekley Family YMCA is in the area. It opened in 1951 as the Southwest YMCA, in West University Place. The current facility in Braeswood Place, Houston broke ground in 2001.

== Media ==
The Houston Chronicle is the area regional newspaper. On Thursdays, residents receive the Bellaire/West U/River Oaks/Meyerland local section.

The West University Examiner is a local newspaper distributed in the community .

The Village News and Southwest News is a local newspaper distributed in the community.

The dismantling of the Southside Place water tower

The city government publishes Southside Place Today, a community newsletter that is included with resident water bills.

In the mid-20th century the community newspaper Southwestern Times served Southside Place and surrounding communities. The paper was headquartered in Rice Village, and it served as an official publication for the city.

== Transportation ==
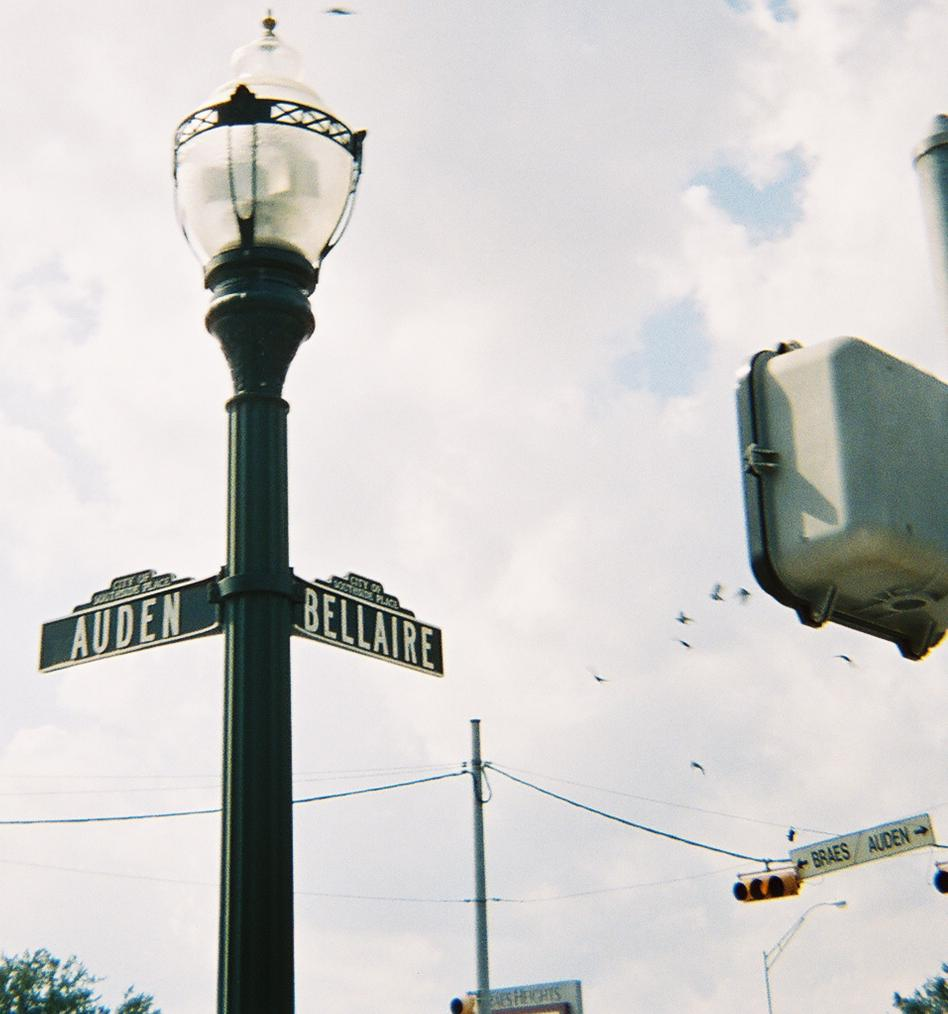
A Southside Place street sign and street light

Southside Place is a member city of the Metropolitan Transit Authority of Harris County, Texas (METRO). The city is served by bus lines 2 (Bellaire), 68 (Brays Bayou Crosstown), and 73 (Bellfort Crosstown).

== See also ==
- List of cities in Texas
