= Thomas P. Ochiltree =

American politician (1839–1902)

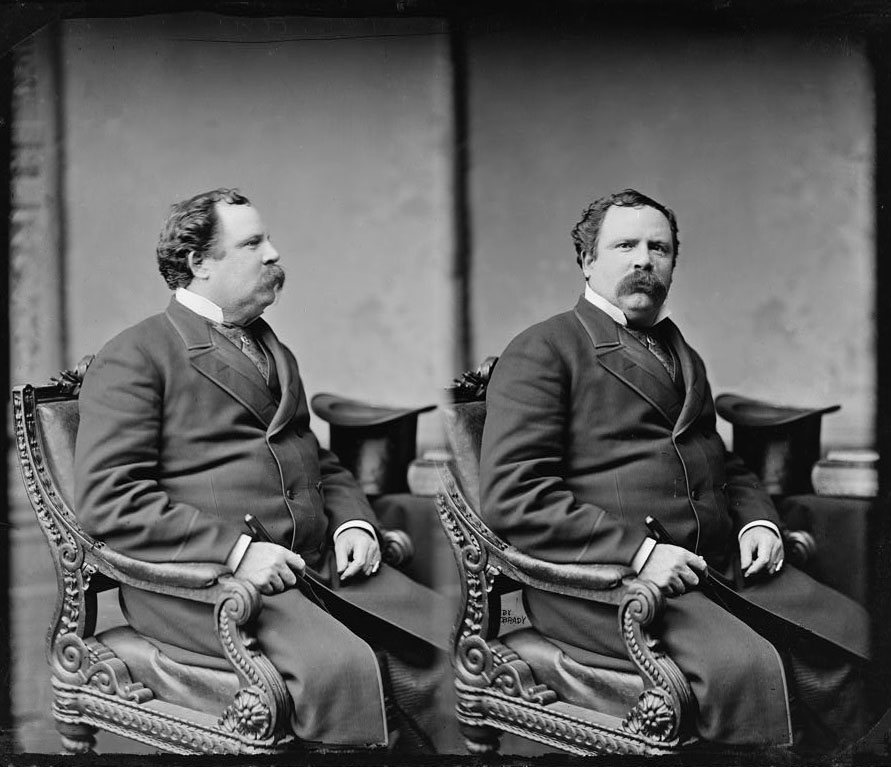

Member of the U.S. House of Representatives from Texas's 7th district
- In office March 4, 1883 – March 3, 1885
- Preceded by: District created
- Succeeded by: William H. Crain

Personal details
- Born: October 26, 1839 Livingston, Alabama
- Died: November 25, 1902 (aged 65) Hot Springs, Virginia, U.S.
- Party: Independent

Thomas Peck Ochiltree (October 26, 1839 – November 25, 1902) was a U.S. representative from Texas.

== Biography ==
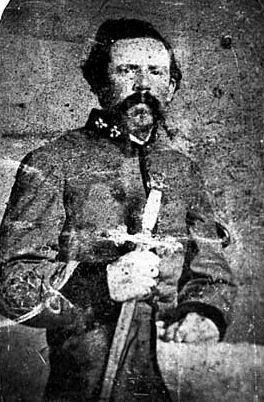
Ochiltree, c. 1860

Born in Livingston, Alabama and raised in Nacogdoches in the Republic of Texas, Ochiltree attended the public schools. He volunteered in 1854 as a private in Capt. John G. Walker's company of Texas Rangers in the campaign against the Apache and Comanche Indians in 1854 and 1855.

He was admitted to the bar by special act of the Texas Legislature in 1857. He served as clerk of the State house of representatives 1856-1859. Secretary of the State Democratic convention in 1859. He was editor of the Jeffersonian in 1860 and 1861. He served as delegate to the Democratic National Conventions at Charleston, South Carolina, and Baltimore, Maryland, in 1860. During the Civil War enlisted in the Confederate States Army in the First Texas Regiment and was promoted successively to lieutenant, captain, and major. He was editor of the Houston Daily Telegraph in 1866–1867. He was appointed commissioner of immigration for Texas in Europe 1870-1873. He was appointed United States marshal for the eastern district of Texas by President Grant January 8, 1874.

Ochiltree was elected as an independent to the Forty-eighth Congress (March 4, 1883 – March 3, 1885). He moved to New York City and retired. He died in Hot Springs, Virginia, on November 25, 1902. He was interred in Green-Wood Cemetery, Brooklyn, New York. He was reinterred in Mount Hope Cemetery, Hastings-on-Hudson, New York, November 8, 1903.

U.S. House of Representatives
Preceded by District Created	United States House of Representatives, Texas District 7; 1883 - 1885	Succeeded by William H. Crain
