= William H. Crain =

American politician (1848–1896)

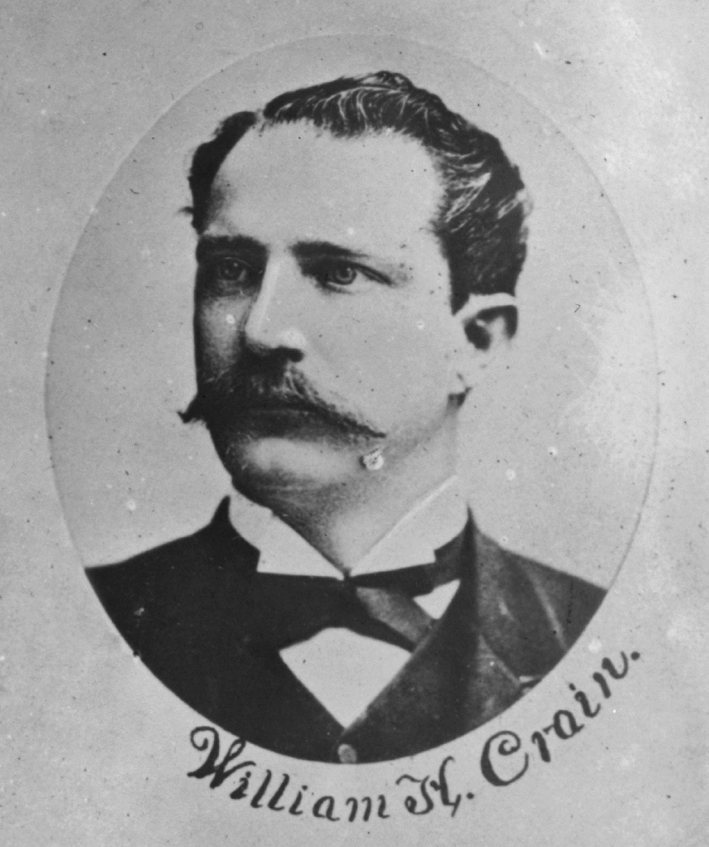

Member of the U.S. House of Representatives from Texas
- In office March 4, 1885 – February 10, 1896
- Preceded by: Thomas P. Ochiltree
- Succeeded by: Rudolph Kleberg
- Constituency: 7th district (1885–1893); 11th district (1893–1896)

Personal details
- Born: November 25, 1848 Galveston, Texas
- Died: February 10, 1896 (aged 47) Washington, D.C.
- Party: Democratic

William Henry Crain (November 25, 1848 – February 10, 1896) was a U.S. representative from Texas.

Born in Galveston, Texas, Crain attended the Christian Brothers' School, New York City, until the age of fourteen, and graduated from St. Francis Xavier's College, New York City, in 1867. He returned to Texas and lived on a ranch for two years. He studied law in Indianola, Texas, while teaching school. He was admitted to the bar in 1871 and commenced practice in Indianola, Texas. He served as member of the Texas Senate 1876–1878. He served as district attorney of the twenty-third judicial district of Texas 1872–1876.

Crain served in the national Democratic convention in 1880. He was elected as a Democrat to the Forty-ninth and to the five succeeding Congresses, serving from March 4, 1885, until his death in Washington, D.C., February 10, 1896. In Congress he opposed both prohibition and the free silver movement. He served as chairman of the Committee on Expenditures on Public Buildings during the Fifty-third Congress.

He died from pneumonia in Washington on February 10, 1896. After his death, a fellow congressman from Texas noted that "Mr. Crain was a poor man; he did not possess the money-making faculty." He was interred in Hillside Cemetery, Cuero, Texas.

== See also ==
- List of members of the United States Congress who died in office (1790–1899)

== Sources ==
- United States Congress. "William H. Crain (id: C000865)". Biographical Directory of the United States Congress.

U.S. House of Representatives
Preceded by Thomas P. Ochiltree	Member of the U.S. House of Representatives from Texas's 7th congressional district March 4, 1885 - March 3, 1893	Succeeded by George C. Pendleton
Preceded by S. W. T. Lanham	Member of the U.S. House of Representatives from Texas's 11th congressional district March 4, 1893 - February 10, 1896	Succeeded by Rudolph Kleberg
