= John Dowdy =

American politician (1912–1995)

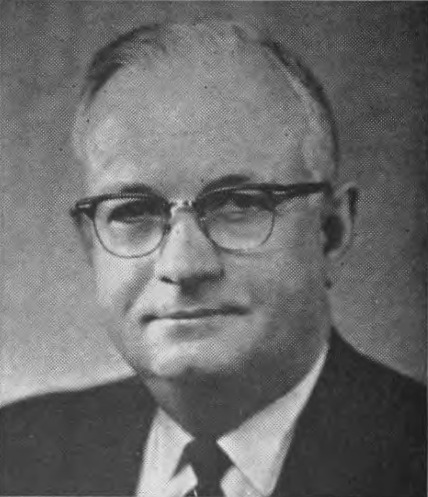

Member of the U.S. House of Representatives from Texas
- In office September 23, 1952 – January 3, 1973
- Preceded by: Tom Pickett
- Succeeded by: Charlie Wilson
- Constituency: 7th district (1952–1967); 2nd district (1967–1973)

Personal details
- Born: John Vernard Dowdy; February 11, 1912 Waco, Texas, U.S.
- Died: April 12, 1995 (aged 83) Athens, Texas, U.S.
- Party: Democratic
- Education: East Texas Baptist University

John Vernard Dowdy (February 11, 1912 – April 12, 1995) was an American politician. Dowdy was a Democratic member of the House of Representatives from the 7th district of Texas from 1952 to 1967 and then served as a congressman from the 2nd district of Texas until 1973, when he decided to retire under indictment for bribery. During his political campaigns his commercials featured the tune "Are You From Dixie" but with the words "Are you for Dowdy, John Dowdy, We'll I'm for Dowdy, too!"

Dowdy was one of four U.S. Congressmen from Texas to originally sign the Southern Manifesto, a resolution in protest of the United States Supreme Court decision in Brown v. Board of Education. Dowdy voted against the Civil Rights Acts of 1957, the Civil Rights Acts of 1960, the Civil Rights Acts of 1964, and the Civil Rights Acts of 1968 as well as the 24th Amendment to the U.S. Constitution and the Voting Rights Act of 1965.

According to prosecutors, he accepted a $25,000 bribe to intervene in the federal investigation of Monarch Construction Company of Silver Spring, Maryland. In 1971, Dowdy was convicted on eight counts: two of conspiracy, one of transporting a bribe over state lines, and five of perjury. In 1973, after Dowdy retired from Congress, the United States Court of Appeals for the Fourth Circuit in Richmond, Virginia, overturned the bribery and conspiracy convictions. Dowdy still served an 18-month sentence in prison for perjury.

Right-wing groups rallied to his defense, including the Washington Observer and the Liberty Lobby, which contended Dowdy was the victim of a "vicious frame-up by the Justice Department in collaboration with a clique of housing racketeers". The ulterior motive, according to the newspaper, was to stop Dowdy's subcommittee investigation of the fraud at the Department of Housing and Urban Development.

Dowdy was born in Waco, Texas, and lived in Texas for most of his life. He was a lawyer before entering politics. He died in Athens, Texas.

== Committee assignments ==
- 83rd Congress — Post Office and Civil Service.
- 84th Congress — Post Office and Civil Service, House Administration.
- 85th through 92nd Congresses — Judiciary, District of Columbia Subcommittee.

== See also ==
- List of federal political scandals in the United States
- List of American federal politicians convicted of crimes

U.S. House of Representatives
Preceded by Tom Pickett	Member of the U.S. House of Representatives from Texas's 7th congressional district 1952–1967	Succeeded by George H. W. Bush
Preceded by Jack Brooks	Member of the U.S. House of Representatives from Texas's 2nd congressional district 1967–1973	Succeeded by Charlie Wilson
