= Tom Pickett =

American politician (1906–1980)

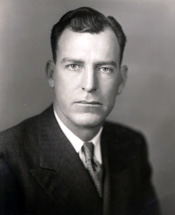
- US Representative from Texas (1945–1952)

Member of the U.S. House of Representatives from Texas's 7th district
- In office January 3, 1945 – June 30, 1952
- Preceded by: Ned Patton
- Succeeded by: John Dowdy

Personal details
- Born: August 14, 1906 Travis, Texas
- Died: June 7, 1980 (aged 73) Leesburg, Florida
- Resting place: St. James Episcopal Church
- Party: Democratic
- Profession: Attorney; Business executive

Thomas Augustus Pickett (August 14, 1906 – June 7, 1980), was an American lawyer and politician who served four terms as a United States representative representing Texas's 7th congressional district from 1945 to 1952.

== Early life and education ==
Born in Travis, Texas on August 14, 1906, Pickett lived in Iola before moving to Palestine, Texas with his family, attending the public schools of Palestine, Texas. He graduated from high school in 1923, began attendance at Conway's Business College, and worked for his father's law office for a year. Between 1924 and 1928, Pickett attended the University of Texas at Austin.

He studied law and was admitted to the Texas Bar in 1929, commencing the practice of law in Palestine, Texas.

== Career ==
He was elected County Attorney of Anderson County, Texas, 1931–1935, and District Attorney of the Third Judicial District of Texas, 1935–1945. In 1944, he beat the Democratic incumbent Nat Patton in the primary and defeated Republican J. Perrin Willis in the general election.

=== Congress ===
He was then elected as a Democrat to the Seventy-ninth Congress in 1944, and was reelected unopposed to the three succeeding Congresses, serving from January 3, 1945, until his resignation on June 30, 1952. During his time in Congress, Pickett served on the House Public Works, Veterans Affairs, and Administration committees, with interests in public works projects on the Neches, Angelinas, and Trinity Rivers, and the economic effects of railroad reorganization for the International-Great Northern Railroad Company on Anderson County.

=== Resignation from Congress ===
He resigned his seat during his term to become Vice President of the National Coal Association from July 1, 1952, to March 31, 1961, and Vice President of the Association of American Railroads from April 1, 1961, to November 30, 1967.

== Retirement and death ==
Once retired, he resided in Leesburg, Florida, until his death there June 7, 1980. He was cremated and his ashes interred at St. James Episcopal Church.

== Sources ==
- United States Congress. "Tom Pickett (id: P000327)". Biographical Directory of the United States Congress.

U.S. House of Representatives
Preceded by Nat Patton	Member of the U.S. House of Representatives from Texas's 7th congressional district 1945–1952	Succeeded by John Dowdy
