= Texas's 7th congressional district =

U.S. House district for Texas

Coordinates: 29°43′27″N 95°30′01″W

- Interactive map of district boundaries
- Representative: Lizzie Fletcher; D–Houston
- Distribution: 99.99% urban; 0.01% rural
- Population (2025): 796,088
- Median household income: $81,848
- Ethnicity: 30.1% Hispanic; 27.4% White; 19.9% Asian; 18.9% Black; 2.8% Two or more races; 0.8% other
- Cook PVI: D+12

Texas's 7th congressional district of the United States House of Representatives comprises a small area of southwestern Houston and Harris County, along with a northern portion of suburban Fort Bend County. As of the 2000 census, the 7th district comprises 651,620 people. Since 2019, it has been represented by Democrat Lizzie Fletcher.

Before 2022, the district was largely viewed as a wealthy, traditionally Republican district covering much of western Houston and surrounding suburbs. The district's best known congressman was George H. W. Bush, who later became the 41st president of the United States and retired to the district after his presidency.

== Recent election results from statewide races ==
=== 2023–2027 boundaries ===
Year	Office	Results
2008	President	Obama 56% - 44%
2012	President	Obama 54% - 46%
2014	Senate	Cornyn 51% - 49%
2014	Governor	Davis 55% - 45%
2016	President	Clinton 63% - 33%
2018	Senate	O'Rourke 67% - 32%
2018	Governor	Valdez 59% - 39%
2018	Lt. Governor	Collier 64% - 34%
2018	Attorney General	Nelson 65% - 33%
2018	Comptroller of Public Accounts	Chevalier 59% - 38%
2020	President	Biden 64% - 34%
2020	Senate	Hegar 60% - 37%
2022	Governor	O'Rourke 63% - 35%
2022	Lt. Governor	Collier 63% - 34%
2022	Attorney General	Mercedes Garza 63% - 35%
2022	Comptroller of Public Accounts	Dudding 60% - 38%
2024	President	Harris 59% - 38%
2024	Senate	Allred 62% - 35%

=== 2027–2033 boundaries ===
Year	Office	Results
2008	President	Obama 57% - 43%
2012	President	Obama 54% - 46%
2014	Senate	Alameel 50.4% - 49.6%
2014	Governor	Davis 56% - 44%
2016	President	Clinton 63% - 32%
2018	Senate	O'Rourke 68% - 31%
2018	Governor	Valdez 60% - 38%
2018	Lt. Governor	Collier 65% - 33%
2018	Attorney General	Nelson 66% - 32%
2018	Comptroller of Public Accounts	Chevalier 60% - 37%
2020	President	Biden 65% - 34%
2020	Senate	Hegar 61% - 37%
2022	Governor	O'Rourke 65% - 34%
2022	Lt. Governor	Collier 65% - 33%
2022	Attorney General	Mercedes Garza 64% - 33%
2022	Comptroller of Public Accounts	Dudding 61% - 37%
2024	President	Harris 60% - 37%
2024	Senate	Allred 63% - 34%
2026	Senate	Talarico 73% - 25%
2026	Governor	Hinojosa 70% - 28%

== Composition ==
For the 118th and successive Congresses (based on redistricting following the 2020 census), the district contains all or portions of the following counties and communities:

Fort Bend County (5)

Four Corners, Houston (part; also 2nd, 8th, 9th, 18th, 22nd, 29th, 36th, 38th; shared with Harris and Montgomery counties), Mission Bend (shared with Fort Bend County), Richmond (part; also 22nd), Sugar Land (part; also 22nd)

Harris County (6)

Bellaire, Houston (part; also 2nd, 8th, 9th, 18th, 22nd, 29th, 36th, 38th; shared with Fort Bend and Montgomery counties), Mission Bend (shared with Fort Bend County), Piney Point Village (part; also 38th), Southside Place, West University Place

== History ==
Texas received a seventh congressional district through reapportionment in 1881 as a result of population growth reflected in the 1880 census; in 1883, Thomas P. Ochiltree, an independent, was elected its first representative. From 1882 to 1902 the district was located in north central Texas and was represented by Wacoan Robert L. Henry. After the redistricting of 1902, the district shifted eastward and was represented by Congressmen from Palestine and Galveston. After 1952, the district again shifted to Waco. From 1885 to 1966, the seventh congressional district elected only Democratic representatives to Congress.

In 1966 the district, then represented by John Dowdy of Waco, was redrawn after the Supreme Court ruled in Wesberry v. Sanders two years earlier that congressional district populations had to be equal or close to equal in population. As a result, the old 7th essentially became the new 2nd district, while a new 7th was created in the western portion of Harris County, home to Houston. Previously, Harris County had been divided between the 8th and 22nd congressional districts. The new 7th stretched from downtown Houston through its fast-growing west side (including the Memorial Villages) out to what were then mostly rural western sections of Harris County including the Addicks and Barker reservoirs, the Katy Prairie and FM 1960. These were among the first areas of Greater Houston to turn Republican as Texas began to gradually shift towards the GOP.

The mid-decade redistricting resulted in the election of George H. W. Bush, a former chairman of the Harris County Republican Party and the son of former Connecticut U.S. senator Prescott Bush, and who unsuccessfully sought the state's Class 1 Senate seat against Democrat Ralph Yarborough in 1964. Bush would go on to hold the district for two terms before making an unsuccessful run for the United States Senate in 1970, losing to Lloyd Bentsen who defeated Yarborough in an upset in the Democratic primary. Bush would eventually go on to become vice president under Ronald Reagan and in 1988 would be elected president. After losing the 1992 election to Bill Clinton, Bush would retire to the 7th where he continued to reside until his death in 2018.

Bush was succeeded by fellow Republican Bill Archer, who would go on to represent the district for 15 terms. Archer would never drop below 79% of the vote as the 7th district, now stretching from the prosperous west side of Houston, including such neighborhoods as River Oaks, Tanglewood, Briargrove, the Energy Corridor and the Memorial Villages, to fast-growing suburbs in the Cypress-Fairbanks and Katy areas and along FM 1960, became reckoned as the most Republican district in the Greater Houston area and arguably one of the most Republican districts in the nation. Archer would rise to prominence in 1994 following the Republican Revolution in which Republicans gained control of the House for the first time in 40 years, with Archer serving as chairman of the influential House Ways and Means Committee for his final three terms.

In 2000, Archer retired from Congress, leading to a highly competitive Republican primary - traditionally the real contest in the heavily Republican district. In the ensuing runoff, State Representative John Culberson, who represented much of the congressional district's western portion, defeated opponent Peter Wareing to win the Republican nomination. By 2002, the district was further reduced in size, now taking in the west side of Houston as well as much of the unincorporated vicinity of the Barker and Addicks reservoirs in west Houston.

Following a controversial 2004 mid-decade redistricting, the district lost Katy and the immediate Barker Reservoir, while also gaining some neighborhoods surrounding Jersey Village and (most penultimately) a southwest section of Houston that encompassed Rice University, the center-right inner suburbs of Bellaire and West University Place, the historically Jewish neighborhood of Meyerland and the historically liberal Montrose area. The latter portion made up the political base of freshman Democratic congressman Chris Bell's 25th district, and historically had not been associated with the 7th during Archer's tenure. While the 7th remained heavily Republican, its dominance was not as strong as in previous elections because of the redistricting. Meanwhile, the bulk of Bell's district had been renumbered as the 9th district and reconfigured as a majority-minority district. Instead of running against Culberson, Bell ran in the Democratic primary for the reconfigured 9th losing to Al Green. Meanwhile, Culberson would go on to win reelection in the 7th against a nominal Democratic challenger in 2004, and won again with under 60 percent of the vote in 2006 in what was considered a bad year for Republicans who lost control of the House for the first time in 12 years.

After the 2012 redistricting process, the 7th lost some of its territory to the adjacent 2nd district of Republican Ted Poe, losing a stretch of territory stretching from north of Jersey Village through Memorial Park to Rice University. In exchange, Culberson gained much of the Greater Katy area south of Interstate 10, as well as a stretch of middle-class suburban areas along the western edge of Highway 6 that had growing Hispanic populations, which also existed in the Sharpstown and Gulfton areas of southwest Houston that were also added to Culberson's district.

Despite the changes, Culberson continued to win reelection in his three successive elections, beating Democratic opponent James Cargas in three consecutive elections from 2012 to 2016. However, the district was one of 23 congressional districts that voted for Democratic presidential candidate Hillary Clinton in 2016 after voting Mitt Romney in 2012, due in part to backlash from some constituents of Republican Donald Trump's campaign rhetoric and stances on such issues as trade and immigration. District residents' favoritism towards free trade and comprehensive immigration reform clashed with Trump's populist stances on these issues. The district swung 23 percent to the left from 2012, more than any other in the nation outside of Utah. Combined with demographic changes in parts of the district as well as the aftermath of Hurricane Harvey, which caused catastrophic damage to many parts of the district in 2017, some political analysts argued the district could be vulnerable to a Democratic takeover in a wave election.

In 2018, when Culberson ran against corporate litigator Lizzie Fletcher, who prevailed out of a crowded and well-funded Democratic primary that gained national attention when supporters of Fletcher's primary runoff opponent, journalist and progressive activist Laura Moser, cried foul over the Democratic Congressional Campaign Committee's supposed preference for Fletcher over Moser in the primary. Despite this controversy, Fletcher prevailed by a comfortable margin in the primary runoff later that May. The race was one of the most closely watched in the nation that year, with Fletcher consistently outraising Culberson throughout the general election. Despite Culberson's proactive leadership in the wake of Hurricane Harvey, Fletcher defeated Culberson to become the first Democrat to represent the district since its realignment as a Houston-based seat in 1966, as the 7th became one of 43 Republican seats (over 1/6th of the Republican conference) to flip Democratic in the 2018 election. Culberson held his own in his longtime base of west Houston and Memorial, areas that had been the district's core for its entire existence; he'd represented much of this area for over three decades at the state and federal levels. However, Fletcher swamped him in the portions of southwest Houston that were added in the 2004 redistricting, as well as in the Hispanic-plurality Bear Creek area near the Addicks Reservoir that was heavily affected by flooding from Harvey. As a measure of how Republican the district had historically been, Fletcher was only the fourth Democrat to even garner 40 percent of the vote in the district.

For the 2022 elections, in order to protect surrounding Republican incumbents, the Republican-controlled Texas Legislature reconfigured the 7th as a heavily Democratic district connecting northern portions of Fort Bend County (including western parts of Sugar Land with largely Asian-American populations) with much of the Westpark Tollway corridor of southwest Houston and Harris County (including the Alief and Mission Bend areas), along with much of inner western Houston inside Loop 610 including portions of the Heights, Midtown, Montrose, Meyerland, Braeswood Place and Timbergrove Manor neighborhoods, as well as The Galleria, Greenway Plaza and the "island suburbs" of Bellaire, West University Place and Southside Place. Most of the 7th's longtime constituency in west Houston, including Memorial City, the Energy Corridor and its entire stretch of the Katy Freeway, as well as the Memorial Villages, Memorial Park, the River Oaks neighborhood and its share of the Greater Katy area, was moved over to the newly drawn 38th District that was expected to strongly favor Republicans, while many of the areas near the Addicks Reservoir (home to large numbers of middle-class Hispanics) were moved into the 8th District. While the new 7th is not as heavily Democratic as the nearby 9th, 18th and 29th districts, Joe Biden won over 60 percent of the vote in the new 7th in 2020 (even though much of the new district was friendlier to Republicans in past elections), securing the district as a safe seat for Fletcher barring any future redistricting challenges or internal factional trends within the Republican Party.

In 2022, Fletcher won a third term in the newly reconfigured 7th District, defeating Republican challenger Johnny Teague; Fletcher's 2020 challenger, Wesley Hunt, would himself be elected to the new 38th anchored in the 7th's old base in west Houston by a comfortable margin.

== List of members representing the district ==
Name	Party	Years	Cong ress	Electoral history	District location
District established March 4, 1883
Thomas P. Ochiltree (Galveston)	Independent	March 4, 1883 – March 3, 1885	48th	Elected in 1882. [data missing]	1883–1887 [data missing]
William H. Crain (Cuero)	Democratic	March 4, 1885 – March 3, 1893	49th 50th 51st 52nd	Elected in 1884. Re-elected in 1886. Re-elected in 1888. Re-elected in 1890. Redistricted to the 11th district.	1883–1887 [data missing]
William H. Crain (Cuero)	Democratic	March 4, 1885 – March 3, 1893	49th 50th 51st 52nd	Elected in 1884. Re-elected in 1886. Re-elected in 1888. Re-elected in 1890. Redistricted to the 11th district.	1887–1889 [data missing]
William H. Crain (Cuero)	Democratic	March 4, 1885 – March 3, 1893	49th 50th 51st 52nd	Elected in 1884. Re-elected in 1886. Re-elected in 1888. Re-elected in 1890. Redistricted to the 11th district.	1889–1893 [data missing]
George C. Pendleton (Belton)	Democratic	March 4, 1893 – March 3, 1897	53rd 54th	Elected in 1892. Re-elected in 1894. [data missing]	1893–1897 [data missing]
Robert L. Henry (Waco)	Democratic	March 4, 1897 – March 3, 1903	55th 56th 57th	Elected in 1896. Re-elected in 1898. Re-elected in 1900. Redistricted to the 11th district.	1897–1903 [data missing]
Alexander W. Gregg (Palestine)	Democratic	March 4, 1903 – March 3, 1919	58th 59th 60th 61st 62nd 63rd 64th 65th	Elected in 1902. Re-elected in 1904. Re-elected in 1906. Re-elected in 1908. Re-elected in 1910. Re-elected in 1912. Re-elected in 1914. Re-elected in 1916. Retired.	1903–1911 [data missing]
Alexander W. Gregg (Palestine)	Democratic	March 4, 1903 – March 3, 1919	58th 59th 60th 61st 62nd 63rd 64th 65th	Elected in 1902. Re-elected in 1904. Re-elected in 1906. Re-elected in 1908. Re-elected in 1910. Re-elected in 1912. Re-elected in 1914. Re-elected in 1916. Retired.	1911–1919 [data missing]
Clay Stone Briggs (Galveston)	Democratic	March 4, 1919 – April 29, 1933	66th 67th 68th 69th 70th 71st 72nd 73rd	Elected in 1918. Re-elected in 1920. Re-elected in 1922. Re-elected in 1924. Re-elected in 1926. Re-elected in 1928. Re-elected in 1930. Re-elected in 1932. Died.	1919–1935 [data missing]
Vacant		April 29, 1933 – June 24, 1933	73rd		1919–1935 [data missing]
Clark W. Thompson (Galveston)	Democratic	June 24, 1933 – January 3, 1935	73rd	Elected to finish Briggs's term. Retired.	1919–1935 [data missing]
Nat Patton (Crockett)	Democratic	January 3, 1935 – January 3, 1945	74th 75th 76th 77th 78th	Elected in 1934. Re-elected in 1936. Re-elected in 1938. Re-elected in 1940. Re-elected in 1942. Lost renomination.	1935–1959 [data missing]
Tom Pickett (Palestine)	Democratic	January 3, 1945 – June 30, 1952	79th 80th 81st 82nd	Re-elected in 1944. Re-elected in 1946. Re-elected in 1948. Re-elected in 1950. Resigned to become Vice President of the National Coal Association.	1935–1959 [data missing]
Vacant		June 30, 1952 – September 23, 1952	82nd		1935–1959 [data missing]
John Dowdy (Athens)	Democratic	September 23, 1952 – January 3, 1967	82nd 83rd 84th 85th 86th 87th 88th 89th	Elected to finish Pickett's term. Re-elected in 1952. Re-elected in 1954. Re-elected in 1956. Re-elected in 1958. Re-elected in 1960. Re-elected in 1962. Re-elected in 1964. Redistricted to the 2nd district.	1935–1959 [data missing]
John Dowdy (Athens)	Democratic	September 23, 1952 – January 3, 1967	82nd 83rd 84th 85th 86th 87th 88th 89th	Elected to finish Pickett's term. Re-elected in 1952. Re-elected in 1954. Re-elected in 1956. Re-elected in 1958. Re-elected in 1960. Re-elected in 1962. Re-elected in 1964. Redistricted to the 2nd district.	1959–1967 [data missing]
George H. W. Bush (Houston)	Republican	January 3, 1967 – January 3, 1971	90th 91st	Elected in 1966. Re-elected in 1968. Retired to run for U.S. Senator.	1967–1973 [data missing]
Bill Archer (Houston)	Republican	January 3, 1971 – January 3, 2001	92nd 93rd 94th 95th 96th 97th 98th 99th 100th 101st 102nd 103rd 104th 105th 106th	Elected in 1970. Re-elected in 1972. Re-elected in 1974. Re-elected in 1976. Re-elected in 1978. Re-elected in 1980. Re-elected in 1982. Re-elected in 1984. Re-elected in 1986. Re-elected in 1988. Re-elected in 1990. Re-elected in 1992. Re-elected in 1994. Re-elected in 1996. Re-elected in 1998. Retired.	1967–1973 [data missing]
Bill Archer (Houston)	Republican	January 3, 1971 – January 3, 2001	92nd 93rd 94th 95th 96th 97th 98th 99th 100th 101st 102nd 103rd 104th 105th 106th	Elected in 1970. Re-elected in 1972. Re-elected in 1974. Re-elected in 1976. Re-elected in 1978. Re-elected in 1980. Re-elected in 1982. Re-elected in 1984. Re-elected in 1986. Re-elected in 1988. Re-elected in 1990. Re-elected in 1992. Re-elected in 1994. Re-elected in 1996. Re-elected in 1998. Retired.	1973–1975 [data missing]
Bill Archer (Houston)	Republican	January 3, 1971 – January 3, 2001	92nd 93rd 94th 95th 96th 97th 98th 99th 100th 101st 102nd 103rd 104th 105th 106th	Elected in 1970. Re-elected in 1972. Re-elected in 1974. Re-elected in 1976. Re-elected in 1978. Re-elected in 1980. Re-elected in 1982. Re-elected in 1984. Re-elected in 1986. Re-elected in 1988. Re-elected in 1990. Re-elected in 1992. Re-elected in 1994. Re-elected in 1996. Re-elected in 1998. Retired.	1975–1983 [data missing]
Bill Archer (Houston)	Republican	January 3, 1971 – January 3, 2001	92nd 93rd 94th 95th 96th 97th 98th 99th 100th 101st 102nd 103rd 104th 105th 106th	Elected in 1970. Re-elected in 1972. Re-elected in 1974. Re-elected in 1976. Re-elected in 1978. Re-elected in 1980. Re-elected in 1982. Re-elected in 1984. Re-elected in 1986. Re-elected in 1988. Re-elected in 1990. Re-elected in 1992. Re-elected in 1994. Re-elected in 1996. Re-elected in 1998. Retired.	1983–1985 [data missing]
Bill Archer (Houston)	Republican	January 3, 1971 – January 3, 2001	92nd 93rd 94th 95th 96th 97th 98th 99th 100th 101st 102nd 103rd 104th 105th 106th	Elected in 1970. Re-elected in 1972. Re-elected in 1974. Re-elected in 1976. Re-elected in 1978. Re-elected in 1980. Re-elected in 1982. Re-elected in 1984. Re-elected in 1986. Re-elected in 1988. Re-elected in 1990. Re-elected in 1992. Re-elected in 1994. Re-elected in 1996. Re-elected in 1998. Retired.	1985–1993 [data missing]
Bill Archer (Houston)	Republican	January 3, 1971 – January 3, 2001	92nd 93rd 94th 95th 96th 97th 98th 99th 100th 101st 102nd 103rd 104th 105th 106th	Elected in 1970. Re-elected in 1972. Re-elected in 1974. Re-elected in 1976. Re-elected in 1978. Re-elected in 1980. Re-elected in 1982. Re-elected in 1984. Re-elected in 1986. Re-elected in 1988. Re-elected in 1990. Re-elected in 1992. Re-elected in 1994. Re-elected in 1996. Re-elected in 1998. Retired.	1993–1997 [data missing]
Bill Archer (Houston)	Republican	January 3, 1971 – January 3, 2001	92nd 93rd 94th 95th 96th 97th 98th 99th 100th 101st 102nd 103rd 104th 105th 106th	Elected in 1970. Re-elected in 1972. Re-elected in 1974. Re-elected in 1976. Re-elected in 1978. Re-elected in 1980. Re-elected in 1982. Re-elected in 1984. Re-elected in 1986. Re-elected in 1988. Re-elected in 1990. Re-elected in 1992. Re-elected in 1994. Re-elected in 1996. Re-elected in 1998. Retired.	1997–2003; Harris
John Culberson (Houston)	Republican	January 3, 2001 – January 3, 2019	107th 108th 109th 110th 111th 112th 113th 114th 115th	Elected in 2000. Re-elected in 2002. Re-elected in 2004. Re-elected in 2006. Re-elected in 2008. Re-elected in 2010. Re-elected in 2012. Re-elected in 2014. Re-elected in 2016. Lost re-election.	1997–2003; Harris
John Culberson (Houston)	Republican	January 3, 2001 – January 3, 2019	107th 108th 109th 110th 111th 112th 113th 114th 115th	Elected in 2000. Re-elected in 2002. Re-elected in 2004. Re-elected in 2006. Re-elected in 2008. Re-elected in 2010. Re-elected in 2012. Re-elected in 2014. Re-elected in 2016. Lost re-election.	2003–2005; Harris
John Culberson (Houston)	Republican	January 3, 2001 – January 3, 2019	107th 108th 109th 110th 111th 112th 113th 114th 115th	Elected in 2000. Re-elected in 2002. Re-elected in 2004. Re-elected in 2006. Re-elected in 2008. Re-elected in 2010. Re-elected in 2012. Re-elected in 2014. Re-elected in 2016. Lost re-election.	2005–2013 Harris (part)
John Culberson (Houston)	Republican	January 3, 2001 – January 3, 2019	107th 108th 109th 110th 111th 112th 113th 114th 115th	Elected in 2000. Re-elected in 2002. Re-elected in 2004. Re-elected in 2006. Re-elected in 2008. Re-elected in 2010. Re-elected in 2012. Re-elected in 2014. Re-elected in 2016. Lost re-election.	2013–2023 Harris (part)
Lizzie Fletcher (Houston)	Democratic	January 3, 2019 – present	116th 117th 118th 119th	Elected in 2018. Re-elected in 2020. Re-elected in 2022. Re-elected in 2024. Re-elected in 2026.	2013–2023 Harris (part)
Lizzie Fletcher (Houston)	Democratic	January 3, 2019 – present	116th 117th 118th 119th	Elected in 2018. Re-elected in 2020. Re-elected in 2022. Re-elected in 2024. Re-elected in 2026.	2023–2027 Fort Bend (part), Harris (part)

== Recent election results ==
=== 2004 ===
United States House of Representatives elections in Texas, 2004: District 7
Party	Candidate	Votes	%	±%
Republican	John Culberson (incumbent)	175,440	64.1	−25.1
Democratic	John Martinez	91,126	33.3	
Independent	Paul Staton	3,713	1.4	
Libertarian	Drew Parks	3,372	1.2	−9.5
Majority		84,314	30.8	
Turnout		273,651		
Republican hold		Swing	-29.2	

=== 2006 ===
United States House of Representatives elections in Texas, 2006: District 7
Party	Candidate	Votes	%	±%
Republican	John Culberson (incumbent)	99,318	59.2	−4.9
Democratic	Jim Henley	64,514	38.5	+5.2
Libertarian	Drew Parks	3,953	2.4	+1.2
Majority				
Turnout		167,785		
Republican hold		Swing		

=== 2008 ===
In 2008, Culberson defeated wind energy executive Michael Skelly to win a fifth term with 56 percent of the vote, despite being vastly outspent by the latter in a surprisingly competitive race–the first that the district had seen in four decades. He was likely helped by John McCain winning the district with 58 percent of the vote in the presidential election.

United States House of Representatives elections in Texas, 2008: District 7
Party	Candidate	Votes	%	±%
Republican	John Culberson (incumbent)	162,205	55.9	−3.3
Democratic	Michael Skelly	122,832	42.3	+3.8
Libertarian	Drew Parks	5,036	1.7	−0.7
Majority				
Turnout		290,073		
Republican hold		Swing		

=== 2010 ===
United States House of Representatives elections in Texas, 2010: District 7
Party	Candidate	Votes	%	±%
Republican	John Culberson (incumbent)	143,665	81.9	+26
Libertarian	Bob Townsend	31,704	18.1	+16.4
Majority				
Turnout		175,369		
Republican hold		Swing		

=== 2012 ===
United States House of Representatives elections in Texas, 2012: District 7
Party	Candidate	Votes	%	±%
Republican	John Culberson (incumbent)	142,477	60.8	−21.1
Democratic	James Cargas	85,253	36.4	
Libertarian	Drew Parks	4,654	2	−16.1
Green	Lance Findley	1,811	0.8	
Majority				
Turnout		234,195		
Republican hold		Swing		

=== 2014 ===
United States House of Representatives elections in Texas, 2014: District 7
Party	Candidate	Votes	%	±%
Republican	John Culberson (incumbent)	90,606	63.3	2.5
Democratic	James Cargas	49,478	34.5	−1.9
Libertarian	Gerald Fowler	4,654	2.2	
Majority				
Turnout		143,219	39.05	
Republican hold		Swing		

=== 2016 ===
United States House of Representatives elections in Texas, 2016: District 7
Party	Candidate	Votes	%	±%
Republican	John Culberson (incumbent)	143,542	56.17	−7.13
Democratic	James Cargas	111,991	43.83	+9.33
Majority				
Turnout		264,267	67.04	27.99
Republican hold		Swing		

=== 2018 ===
United States House of Representatives elections in Texas, 2018: District 7
Party	Candidate	Votes	%
Democratic	Lizzie Fletcher	127,959	52.5
Republican	John Culberson (incumbent)	115,642	47.5
Total votes		243,601	100.0
Democratic gain from Republican			

=== 2020 ===
United States House of Representatives elections in Texas, 2020: District 7
Party	Candidate	Votes	%	±%
Democratic	Lizzie Fletcher (incumbent)	158,019	50.76	−1.77
Republican	Wesley Hunt	147,802	47.47	0
Libertarian	Shawn Kelly	5,514	1.77	+1.77
Majority		10,217	3.29	−1.77
Turnout		311,335		
Democratic hold		Swing		

=== 2022 ===
United States House of Representatives elections in Texas, 2022: District 7
Party	Candidate	Votes	%
Democratic	Lizzie Fletcher (incumbent)	115,994	63.79
Republican	Johnny Teague	65,835	36.21
Total votes		181,929	100.0
Democratic hold			

=== 2024 ===
United States House of Representatives elections in Texas, 2024: District 7
Party	Candidate	Votes	%
Democratic	Lizzie Fletcher (incumbent)	148,406	61.2
Republican	Caroline Kane	94,204	38.8
Total votes		242,610	100.0
Democratic hold			

=== 2026 ===
United States House of Representatives elections in Texas, 2026: District 7
Party	Candidate	Votes	%
Democratic	Lizzie Fletcher (incumbent)	123,614	72.6
Republican	Alexander Hale	44,200	25.9
Green	Espoir Ngabo	2,521	1.5
Total votes		170,335	100.0
Democratic hold			

== See also ==
- List of United States congressional districts
