= Clay Stone Briggs =

American politician and lawyer (1876–1933)

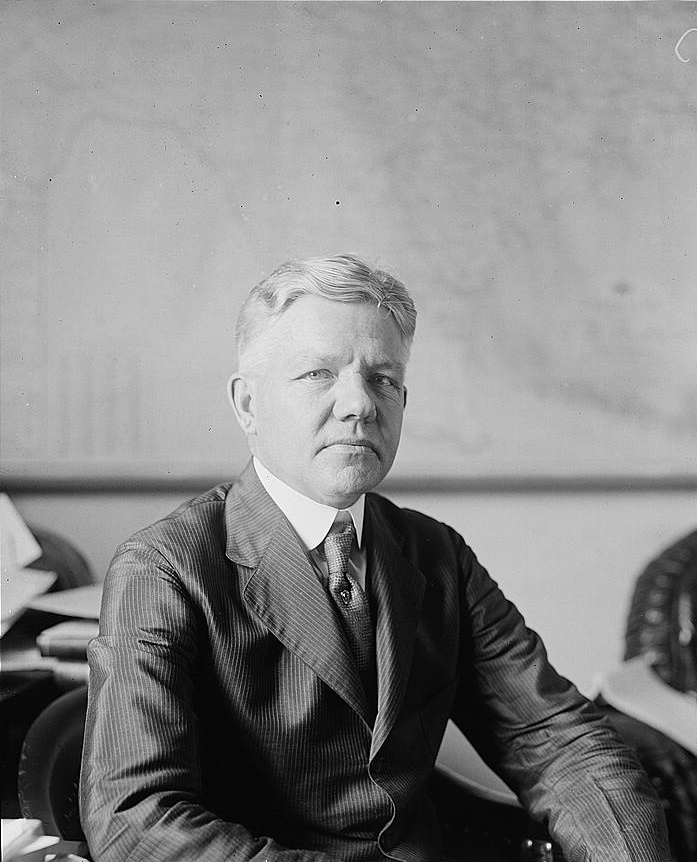
- Briggs in 1921

Member of the U.S. House of Representatives from Texas's 7th district
- In office March 4, 1919 – April 29, 1933
- Preceded by: Alexander W. Gregg
- Succeeded by: Clark W. Thompson

Member of the Texas House of Representatives from the 30th district
- In office January 8, 1907 – January 12, 1909

Personal details
- Born: January 8, 1876 Galveston, Texas, US
- Died: April 29, 1933 (aged 57) Washington, D.C., US
- Resting place: Oakwood Cemetery
- Party: Democratic
- Occupation: Politician, lawyer

Clay Stone Briggs (January 8, 1876 – April 29, 1933) was an American politician and lawyer. A Democrat, he was a member of the United States House of Representatives from Texas, serving from 1919 until his death.

== Early life and education ==
Briggs was born on January 8, 1876, in Galveston, Texas, the son of George Dempster Briggs and Olive (née Branch) Briggs. Educated at both public and private schools, he attended Ball High School. He studied at Harvard University, the University of Texas at Austin, and Yale Law School. In 1896, he brought about a riot at Harvard, in which police and students fought due to students parading at the end of the school year. He graduated from Yale in 1899, with a Bachelor of Laws.

== Career ==
Also in 1899, Briggs was admitted to the bar, after which he began practicing law in Galveston. He was the judge of Texas's 10th District Court from June 15, 1909, until his resignation on February 1, 1919.

Briggs was a Democrat. He represented Texas's 30th district the state House of Representatives from January 8, 1907, to January 12, 1909. He was a member of the United States House of Representatives from March 4, 1919, until his death, representing Texas's 7th district. While serving, he was a member of the Committee on Merchant Marine and Fisheries. Politically, he was liberal.

== Personal life and death ==
Briggs married twice, his second wife being Lois Slayton Woodworth, whom he married on August 27, 1927. He had two children with her, and had three stepchildren. He was Anglican. He was a member of the Benevolent and Protective Order of Elks and the YMCA. He abstained from alcohol and tobacco use.

Briggs died on April 29, 1933, aged 57, in Washington, D.C., from a myocardial infraction. Originally, plans were to bring his body to Galveston, but he was buried at Oakwood Cemetery, in Syracuse. Archives of his papers are held by the Dolph Briscoe Center for American History and Duke University Libraries.

== See also ==
- List of members of the United States Congress who died in office (1900–1949)

Texas House of Representatives
Preceded by Thomas Masterson	Member of the Texas House of Representatives from District 23 (Galveston); 1907–1909	Succeeded by Daniel MacInerney
U.S. House of Representatives
Preceded by Alexander W. Gregg	Member of the U.S. House of Representatives from Texas's 7th congressional district March 4, 1919 – April 29, 1933	Succeeded by Clark W. Thompson
