= Nat Patton =

American politician (1881–1957)

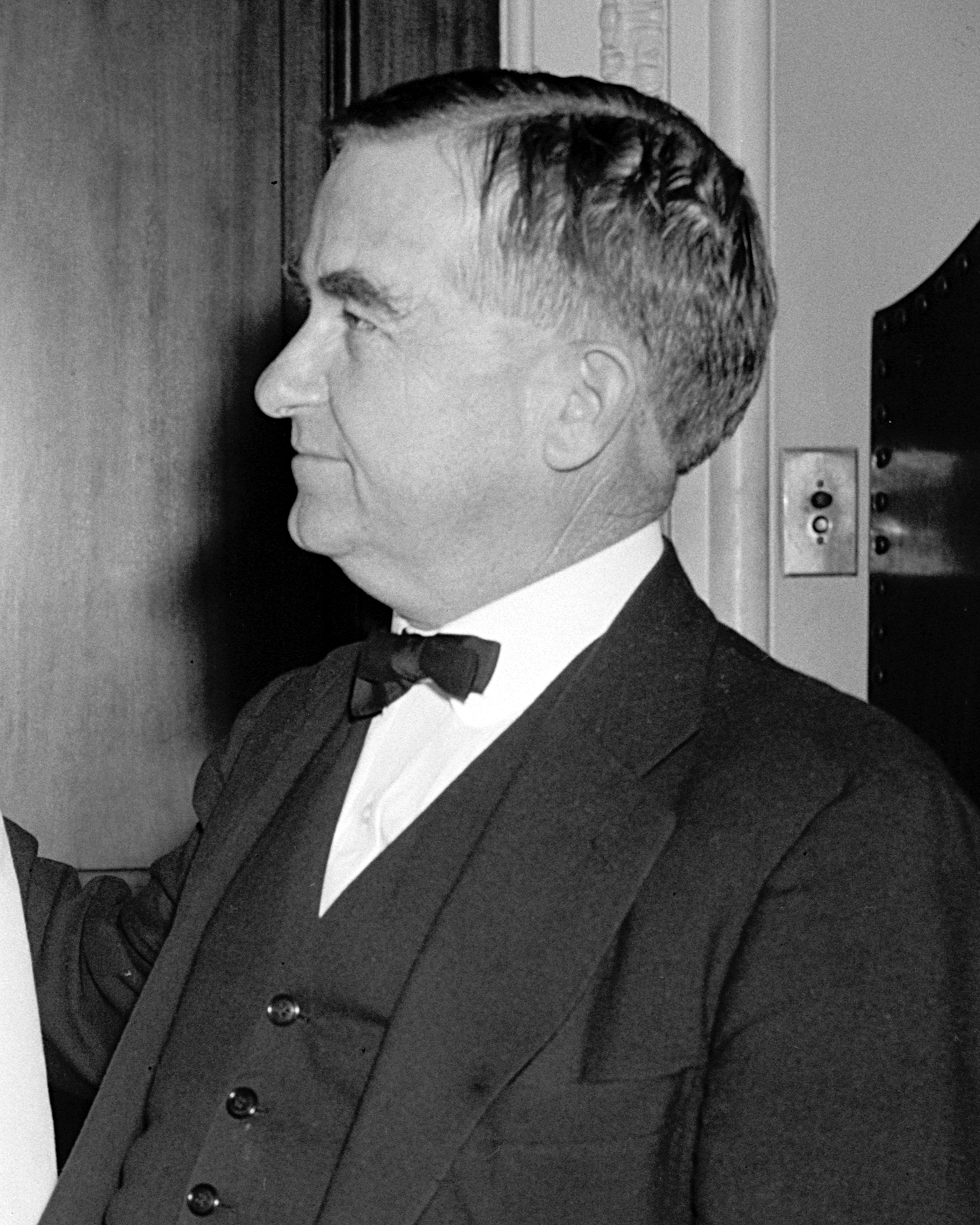
- Nat Patton

Member of the U.S. House of Representatives from Texas's 7th district
- In office January 3, 1935 – January 3, 1945
- Preceded by: Clark W. Thompson
- Succeeded by: Tom Pickett

Personal details
- Born: February 26, 1881 Houston County, Texas
- Died: July 27, 1957 (aged 76) Crockett, Texas
- Resting place: Evergreen Memorial Park
- Party: Democratic

Nat Patton (February 26, 1881 – July 27, 1957), also known as "Cousin Nat", was an American lawyer and politician who served five terms as a Democratic member of the United States House of Representatives from the 7th District of Texas from 1935 to 1945.

== Early life and career ==
Patton was born on a farm near tiny Tadmor in Houston County near Crockett in east Texas. He attended rural schools and Sam Houston Normal School in Huntsville. He taught in the rural and high schools from 1899 to 1918.

=== Early political career ===
He was elected to the Texas House of Representatives in 1912, attended law school at the University of Texas at Austin, was admitted to the bar in 1918, and began his law practice in Crockett.

During the First World War, Patton enlisted in the United States Army but was never sworn in because the armistice was signed.

Patton was elected in 1918 as county judge of Houston County and served until 1922.

He served in the Texas State Senate from 1929 to 1934. He was also a delegate to the Texas Democratic state conventions in 1924 and 1935.

=== Congress ===
In 1934, Patton was elected to the Seventy-fourth and then to the four succeeding Congresses (January 3, 1935 – January 3, 1945). Patton was defeated for renomination in 1944 by Tom Pickett.

== Later career and death ==
He resumed the practice of law in Crockett until his death; he is interred there in Evergreen Memorial Park.

== Affiliations ==
He was a member of the Miller group in Washington.

Texas House of Representatives
Preceded by August Haxthausen	Member of the Texas House of Representatives from District 24 (Crockett); 1913–1915	Succeeded by John Hairston
Texas Senate
Preceded by Henry L. Lewis	Texas State Senator from District 5 (Crockett); 1929–1935	Succeeded by Gordon M. Burns
U.S. House of Representatives
Preceded by Clark W. Thompson	Member of the U.S. House of Representatives from Texas's 7th congressional district 1935–1945	Succeeded by Tom Pickett
