= Clark W. Thompson (Texas politician) =

American politician

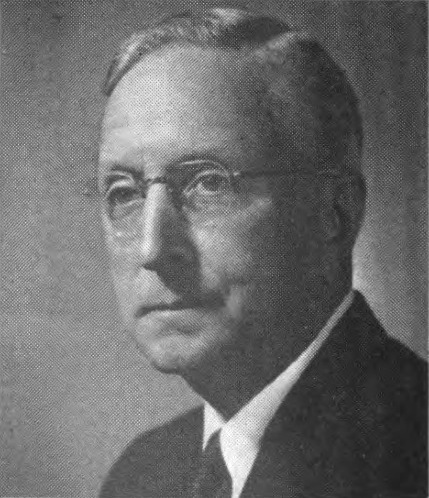

Member of the U.S. House of Representatives from Texas
- In office August 23, 1947 – December 30, 1966
- Preceded by: Joseph J. Mansfield
- Succeeded by: Jack Brooks
- Constituency: 9th district
- In office June 24, 1933 – January 3, 1935
- Preceded by: Clay Stone Briggs
- Succeeded by: Ned Patton
- Constituency: 7th district

Personal details
- Born: Clark Wallace Thompson; August 6, 1896 La Crosse, Wisconsin, US
- Died: December 16, 1981 (aged 85) Galveston, Texas, US
- Resting place: Galveston Memorial Park Cemetery
- Party: Democratic
- Spouse: Libbie Moody

Military service
- Allegiance: United States
- Branch/service: United States Marine Corps
- Years of service: 1917–1946
- Rank: Colonel
- Commands: Division of Reserve

Clark Wallace Thompson (August 6, 1896 – December 16, 1981) was a United States Marine Corps veteran of World War I and World War II, who served 11 terms in the U.S. House of Representatives in the mid-20th century.

== Early life and education ==
Thompson was born in La Crosse, Wisconsin on August 6, 1896, and moved to Oregon in 1901 with his parents, who settled in Cascade Locks. Thompson attended the common schools and the University of Oregon at Eugene.

== World Wars ==
He enlisted in the United States Marine Corps during the First World War serving from 1917 to 1918. He remained a United States Marine Corps reservist until 1946 except when he again served on active duty during World War II from 1940 to 1942.

From 1943 to 1945 he was the officer in charge, United States Marine Corps Reserve, and held the rank of colonel.

== Family ==
On November 16, 1918, he married Libbie Moody, daughter of William Lewis Moody, Jr. of Galveston, Texas.

== Career ==
Thompson was treasurer of the American National Insurance Company.

=== Congress ===
He was a Democratic member of the House of Representatives from the 7th district of Texas from 1933 to 1935, having been elected to fill the vacancy caused by the death of United States Representative Clay Stone Briggs.

Following World War II, he represented Texas's 9th district from 1947 until he retired in 1966. He was one of the majority of the Texan delegation to decline to sign the 1956 Southern Manifesto opposing the desegregation of public schools ordered by the Supreme Court in Brown v. Board of Education. However, Thompson voted against the Civil Rights Acts of 1957 and 1960, as well as the 24th Amendment to the U.S. Constitution, while voting present on the Civil Rights Act of 1964 and not voting on the Voting Rights Act of 1965.

== Death and burial ==
Thompson died on December 16, 1981, in Galveston, Texas and was buried in Galveston Memorial Park Cemetery.

U.S. House of Representatives
Preceded by Clay Stone Briggs	Member of the U.S. House of Representatives from Texas's 7th congressional district 1933–1935	Succeeded by Nat Patton
Preceded by Joseph J. Mansfield	Member of the U.S. House of Representatives from Texas's 9th congressional district 1947–1966	Succeeded by Jack Brooks
Military offices
Preceded by Littleton W. T. Waller Jr.	Officer in Charge of the Division of Reserve; 1943–1945	Succeeded by Franklin A. Hart
